= List of West German films of 1966 =

List of films produced in West Germany in 1966

List of West German films of 1966. Feature films produced and distributed in West Germany in 1966.

== 1966 ==
Title	Director	Cast	Genre	Notes
4 Schlüssel	Jürgen Roland	Günther Ungeheuer, Hanns Lothar, Walter Rilla, Monika Peitsch, Hellmut Lange, Joseph Offenbach	Crime thriller	a.k.a. The Four Keys
The Abduction of the Sabine Women	Hans Dieter Schwarze	Kurt Ehrhardt, Hans Karl Friedrich, Fita Benkhoff, Erik Schumann	Comedy	a.k.a. Der Raub der Sabinerinnen
Das Abgründige in Herrn Gerstenberg	Axel von Ambesser	Wolfgang Kieling, Maria Sebaldt, Gertraud Jesserer, Axel von Ambesser	Comedy	
Abschied	Peter Lilienthal	Max Haufler, Andrea Grosske, Angelika Hurwicz	Drama	
Agent 505: Death Trap in Beirut	Manfred R. Köhler	Frederick Stafford, Geneviève Cluny, Harald Leipnitz, Chris Howland	Eurospy thriller	West German-French-Italian co-production
Alle mal herhören, auch die, die schwerhören!	Kurt Wilhelm	Jürgen Goslar, Gerlinde Locker, Charles Régnier	Musical, Biography	a.k.a. Erich Kästner – Alle mal herhören, auch die, die schwerhören!
Angelique and the King	Bernard Borderie	Michèle Mercier, Robert Hossein, Sami Frey, Jean Rochefort, Fred Williams, Ann Smyrner	Historical adventure	French-Italian-West German co-production
Apfelsinen	Kurt Wilhelm	Horst Frank, Heinz Reincke	Crime	a.k.a. Oranges
Axel an der Himmelstür	Hans Heinrich	Ruth Maria Kubitschek, Vico Torriani, Hubert von Meyerinck	Musical	
The Battle of the Mods	Franco Montemurro	Ricky Shayne, Joachim Fuchsberger, Elga Andersen, Eleonora Brown, Jürgen Draeger	Musical	a.k.a. Crazy Baby. Italian-West German co-production
Bei Pfeiffers ist Ball	Thomas Engel	Cornelia Froboess, Berta Drews, Willi Rose	Musical	
Der Beginn	Peter Lilienthal	Kim Parnass, Dunja Rajter	Drama	
Begründung eines Urteils	Eberhard Itzenplitz	Edgar Hoppe, Karl-Maria Schley, Gerd Baltus, Günter Mack, Heinz Weiss	Drama	
Berta Garlan	Ludwig Cremer	Gertrud Kückelmann, Helmuth Lohner, Charles Régnier	Drama	
Bethanien	Hagen Mueller-Stahl	Gertrud Kückelmann	Drama	Remake of Angels of Sin (1943)
Betriebsfest	Klaus Wagner	Hans W. Hamacher, Wolfram Schaerf, Dirk Dautzenberg, Karin Heym, Erich Dunskus	Drama	
Beyond This Place	Karlheinz Bieber	Fritz Wepper, Ilse Steppat, Karl John	Crime	a.k.a. Hinter diesen Mauern
The Big Client	Walter Davy	Walter Kohut, Richard Münch	Comedy	a.k.a. Das große Geschäft. Austrian-West German co-production
The Big Noise	Walter Knaus	Albert Lieven, Gunnar Möller	Comedy, Science fiction	a.k.a. Hobby
Black Market of Love	Ernst Hofbauer	Uta Levka, Astrid Frank	Crime	
Blithe Spirit	Trude Kolman	Johanna von Koczian, Maria Sebaldt, Günther Schramm, Elisabeth Flickenschildt	Comedy	a.k.a. Oh, diese Geister
Das Bohrloch	Rainer Erler	Fritz Muliar, Fritz Straßner, Konstantin Delcroix, Gustl Bayrhammer, Wolfgang Völz	Comedy	a.k.a. Das Bohrloch oder Bayern ist nicht Texas
The Boy Cried Murder	George Breakston	Fraser MacIntosh, Veronica Hurst, Phil Brown, Tim Barrett	Crime	British-West German-Yugoslav co-production
Breath of Spring	Franz Josef Wild	Edith Heerdegen, Eric Pohlmann, Chariklia Baxevanos	Crime comedy	a.k.a. Feine Herrschaften
The Brides of Fu Manchu	Don Sharp	Christopher Lee, Douglas Wilmer, Heinz Drache, Marie Versini, Rupert Davies, Roger Hanin, Harald Leipnitz	Thriller	British-West German co-production
Der Brief	Vlado Kristl	Vlado Kristl	Experimental	a.k.a. The Letter
The Burden of Proof	Eberhard Itzenplitz	Heinz Schubert	Crime drama	a.k.a. Der Mann mit der Puppe
The Cage	Heinz Schirk	Karl-Maria Schley	Drama	a.k.a. Der Käfig
Caligula	Ludwig Cremer	Horst Frank, Charles Régnier, Hans Korte, Krista Keller	Drama	
Call Girls of Frankfurt	Rolf Olsen	Vera Tschechowa, Claus Ringer, Erik Schumann, Barbara Valentin, Konrad Georg, Walter Kohut, Richard Münch	Crime	a.k.a. Hot Nights in Frankfurt. West German-Austrian co-production
Caroline	Fritz Umgelter	Sigrid Marquardt, Hans Caninenberg	Comedy	a.k.a. The Unattainable
The Case of Joan of Arc	Paul Verhoeven	Kathrin Schmid, Wolfgang Büttner, Carl Lange, Ernst Fritz Fürbringer, Benno Sterzenbach	History	a.k.a. Der Fall Jeanne d'Arc
Das Cello	Peter Hamel	Helga Anders, Christian Doermer, Luitgard Im	Thriller	a.k.a. The Cello
The Cherry Orchard	Peter Zadek	Margot Trooger, Hans Jaray, Rudolf Forster, Klaus Höhne, Gisela Trowe, Heinz Bennent	Drama	a.k.a. Der Kirschgarten
Circus of Fear	John Llewellyn Moxey	Christopher Lee, Suzy Kendall, Leo Genn, Heinz Drache, Eddi Arent, Klaus Kinski	Mystery thriller	Based on Edgar Wallace. British-West German co-production
Come to the Blue Adriatic	Lothar Gündisch	Dietmar Schönherr, Hannelore Auer, Gustavo Rojo	Musical comedy	West German-Spanish co-production
Conan Doyle und der Fall Edalji	Karlheinz Bieber	Paul Klinger	Crime, Docudrama	
Congress of Love	Géza von Radványi	Curd Jürgens, Lilli Palmer, Hannes Messemer, Françoise Arnoul, Paul Meurisse	Comedy	a.k.a. Der Kongreß amüsiert sich a.k.a. Lovers and Kings. West German-Austrian-French co-production
Corinne und der Seebär	Thomas Engel	Marthe Keller, Volker Lechtenbrink	Comedy	
Countdown to Doomsday	Marcello Baldi	George Ardisson, Harald Leipnitz, Horst Frank	Eurospy thriller	Italian-West German co-production
Countess Mizzi	Wolfgang Glück	Gertrud Kückelmann, Egon von Jordan, Hans Jaray, Herta Staal	Comedy	a.k.a. Komtesse Mizzi
Crusts	Hans-Reinhard Müller	Ursula Lingen, Renate Heuser	Drama	a.k.a. Das harte Brot
The Day of Wrath	Kurt Meisel	Heinz Moog, Manfred Inger, Harry Meyen, Erika Pluhar	War, Drama	
The Days and Nights of BeeBee Fenstermaker	Rolf von Sydow	Loni von Friedl	Drama	
The Defector	Raoul Lévy	Montgomery Clift, Hardy Krüger, Macha Méril, Roddy McDowall, Hannes Messemer	Cold War spy film	French-West German co-production
Destry Rides Again	Dietrich Haugk	Wolfgang Reichmann, Rosl Schäfer, Walter Kohut	Western, Musical	a.k.a. Destry reitet wieder
Diamond Safari	Michel Drach	Jean-Louis Trintignant, Marie-José Nat, Horst Frank, Hellmut Lange	Thriller	French-West German co-production
The Doctor Speaks Out	Aleksander Ford	Tadeusz Łomnicki, René Deltgen, Margot Trooger, Dieter Borsche, Charles Régnier	Drama	
Double Stakes	Erich Neureuther	Carl-Heinz Schroth, Horst Tappert, Brigitte Grothum	Crime	a.k.a. Das ganz große Ding
Electra	Hans-Reinhard Müller	Elfriede Kuzmany, Friedhelm Ptok, Wolfgang Büttner, Maria Wimmer, Heinrich Schweiger	Drama	a.k.a. Elektra
Elisabeth Tarakanow	Werner Schlechte	Christine Ostermayer, Kurt Heintel	Drama	a.k.a. Elizabeth Tarakanova
Ein Engel namens Schmitt	Gerhard Metzner	Dieter Hufschmidt, Violetta Ferrari, Karl Schönböck, Fita Benkhoff, Rudolf Lenz	Musical comedy	
Das Experiment	Rolf von Sydow	Carl-Heinz Schroth, Gunnar Möller, Ernst Fritz Fürbringer, Vladimir Medar, Molly Peters	Comedy	
Face of a Hero	Michael Kehlmann	Robert Graf, Hans Clarin, Rolf Boysen, Catana Cayetano, Gerlinde Locker, Walter Buschhoff	Drama	
Der Fall Auer/Ranneth – Unschuldig hinter Gittern	Gedeon Kovács	Bruno Dallansky, Hugo Gottschlich	Docudrama	
Der Fall Bohr	Walter Davy	Ernst Deutsch, Aglaja Schmid, Rudolf Lenz, Helmut Qualtinger	Crime, History	Austrian-West German co-production
Der Fall der Generale	Gedeon Kovács	Bernhard Minetti, Benno Sterzenbach, Fritz Tillmann	Docudrama	a.k.a. The Blomberg-Fritsch Affair
Der Fall Hau	Joachim Hess	Werner Bruhns	Crime, Docudrama	a.k.a. The Case of Carl Hau
Der Fall Kapitän Behrens	Wolfgang Staudte	Wolfgang Preiss	Drama	a.k.a. Der Fall Kapitän Behrens – Fremdenlegionäre an Bord
Der Fall Kaspar Hauser	Robert A. Stemmle	Wilfried Gössler, Wilhelm Borchert	Biography, History	
Der Fall Lothar Malskat	Günter Meincke	Hanns Lothar	Docudrama, Crime comedy	
Der Fall Mata Hari	Paul Verhoeven	Louise Martini, Paul Verhoeven, Carl Lange, Hans Korte	Spy, War, Docudrama	a.k.a. The Mata Hari Case
Der Fall Rouger	Erich Neureuther	Margot Trooger, Karl Michael Vogler, Günther Schramm, Paul Hoffmann	Drama	
Finden Sie Livingstone!	Theodor Grädler	Bert Fortell, Brian O'Shaughnessy, Simon Sabela, Hans W. Hamacher	Docudrama, Adventure	a.k.a. Finden Sie Livingstone! – Die Suche nach dem verschollenen Forscher und Missionar
The First and the Last	Falk Harnack	Arno Assmann, Hartmut Reck, Claudia Brodzinska, Wolfried Lier	Drama	a.k.a. Die Ersten und die Letzten
A Flea in Her Ear	Rolf von Sydow	Romuald Pekny, Brigitte Rau, Lukas Ammann	Comedy	a.k.a. Der Floh im Ohr
The Flies	Rudolf Noelte	Will Quadflieg, Thomas Holtzmann, Cordula Trantow	Drama	
Freiheit im Dezember	Fritz Umgelter	Hans Caninenberg, Hellmut Lange, Werner Kreindl, Heinz Bennent, Miriam Spoerri, Louise Martini	Drama	a.k.a. Freedom in December a.k.a. Freedom in September
The Gardener of Argenteuil	Jean-Paul Le Chanois	Jean Gabin, Liselotte Pulver, Curd Jürgens	Comedy	French-West German co-production
Gáspár Varrós Recht	Dieter Munck	Robert Freitag, Louise Martini, Claus Wilcke, Margot Philipp, Manfred Inger, Richard Lauffen, Stanislav Ledinek	Drama	
Der geborgte Weihnachtsbaum	Dietrich Haugk	Walter Giller	Drama	
Geibelstraße 27	Peter Beauvais	Dirk Dautzenberg, Uwe Friedrichsen, Bodil Steen, Barbara Schöne, Helga Feddersen, Witta Pohl, Liane Hielscher, Benno Hoffmann	Comedy	
Das Geld liegt auf der Straße	Klaus Überall	Violetta Ferrari, Michael Hinz, Ralf Wolter	Musical comedy	a.k.a. Money on the Street
Die gelehrten Frauen	Gerhard Klingenberg	Luise Ullrich, Brigitte Grothum, Alfred Balthoff, Edda Seippel, Charles Régnier, Peter Arens, Hartmut Reck	Comedy	a.k.a. The Learned Ladies a.k.a. Les Femmes Savantes
Die Gentlemen bitten zur Kasse	John Olden, Claus Peter Witt	Horst Tappert, Günther Neutze, Kai Fischer, Grit Boettcher, Siegfried Lowitz	Crime	a.k.a. The Great British Train Robbery
Geronimo und die Räuber	Arthur Maria Rabenalt	Siegfried Rauch, Hubert Suschka, Michael Hinz, Catana Cayetano, Gudrun Thielemann	Musical	
Die Geschichte des Rittmeisters Schach von Wuthenow	Hans Dieter Schwarze	Karl Michael Vogler, Monika Peitsch, Dagmar Altrichter, Claus Biederstaedt, Michael Degen, Gertrud Kückelmann	Drama	a.k.a. A Man of Honor
Geschlossene Gesellschaft	Franz Peter Wirth	Gisela Uhlen, Wolfgang Kieling, Andrea Dahmen	Drama	a.k.a. No Exit a.k.a. Huis Clos
Gesellschaftsspiel	Peter Schulze-Rohr	Luitgard Im, Bruni Löbel	Drama	a.k.a. Surface of Innocence
Ghosts	Peter Beauvais	Martin Held, Karin Baal, Angela Salloker, Martin Benrath, Rudolf Platte	Drama	a.k.a. Gespenster
Gideon	Wilhelm Semmelroth	Max Eckard, Bernhard Minetti	Comedy	
Goldilocks	Hans Heinrich	Ingrid van Bergen, Peter Carsten, Harry Wüstenhagen	Musical	a.k.a. Der große Schwindel – Musical aus der Welt des Stummfilms
The Good, the Bad and the Ugly	Sergio Leone	Clint Eastwood, Lee Van Cleef, Eli Wallach	Western	Italian-Spanish-West German co-production
Graf Kozsibrovszky macht ein Geschäft	Karlheinz Bieber	Karl Michael Vogler, Monika Peitsch, Gregor von Rezzori, Lukas Ammann	Comedy	
Die Grenzziehung	Rolf Hädrich	Gunnar Möller	Black comedy	a.k.a. The House on the Border
Große Liebe	Johannes Schaaf	Immy Schell, Horst Naumann, Heinz Meier	Drama	
Großer Ring mit Außenschleife	Eugen York	Gustav Knuth, Ruth Maria Kubitschek	Drama	
Der Großtyrann und das Gericht	Günther Fleckenstein	Thomas Holtzmann, Antje Weisgerber, Peter Brogle, Karl-Georg Saebisch, Karin Heym, Konrad Georg	Drama	
Hava, der Igel	Hans Quest	Ulli Philipp, Hans Putz, Dagmar Altrichter, Claus Biederstaedt, Michael Ande, Violetta Ferrari	Drama	
The Head Waiter	Siegmar Schneider	Hans Korte	Drama	a.k.a. Der Oberkellner
Das heilige Experiment	Rainer Wolffhardt	Otto Rouvel, Paul Hoffmann, Friedrich Joloff	Drama	a.k.a. The Strong Are Lonely a.k.a. The Holy Experiment
Herr Puntila and His Servant Matti	Rolf Hädrich	Mario Adorf, Karin Baal, Leonard Steckel	Comedy	a.k.a. Mr. Puntila and His Man Matti
High Season for Spies	Julio Coll	Letícia Román, Peter van Eyck, Klausjürgen Wussow	Eurospy thriller	Spanish-West German co-production
Die Hinrichtung	Erich Neuberg	Helmut Qualtinger, Kurt Sowinetz	Black comedy	Austrian-West German co-production
Hocuspocus	Kurt Hoffmann	Heinz Rühmann, Liselotte Pulver	Comedy	
Honour Among Thieves	Wolfgang Staudte	Gert Fröbe, Mario Adorf, Karin Baal, Curt Bois	Crime comedy	a.k.a. Ganovenehre
How I Learned to Love Women	Luciano Salce	Robert Hoffmann, Michèle Mercier, Nadja Tiller, Elsa Martinelli, Anita Ekberg, Sandra Milo, Zarah Leander	Comedy	Italian-French-West German co-production
The Hunchback of Soho	Alfred Vohrer	Günther Stoll, Pinkas Braun, Monika Peitsch, Eddi Arent, Siegfried Schürenberg, Hubert von Meyerinck	Mystery thriller	Based on Edgar Wallace
Hurra, die Rattles kommen	Alexander Welbat	The Rattles	Musical	
I Am Looking for a Man	Alfred Weidenmann	Ghita Nørby, Walter Giller, Brigitte Horney, Harald Leipnitz, Paul Hubschmid, Georg Thomalla	Comedy	
Ich war Schlemihl	Dietrich Haugk	Klaus Schwarzkopf	Comedy	
An Ideal Husband	Franz Josef Wild	Karlheinz Böhm, Ruth Maria Kubitschek, Anaid Iplicjian, Alexander Kerst	Comedy	
Im Jahre Neun	Oswald Döpke	Gerd Baltus, Hans Söhnker, Günter Strack, Carl Lange, Anneli Granget	Comedy	a.k.a. Im Jahre 9
The Investigation	Peter Schulze-Rohr	Ida Ehre, Hanne Hiob, Pinkas Braun, Herbert Fleischmann, Wolf Frees, Heinz Giese, Bum Krüger, Hellmut Lange, Stanislav Ledinek, Helmut Peine, Benno Sterzenbach, Heinz Wemper, Siegfried Wischnewski	Drama, War	
It	Ulrich Schamoni	Sabine Sinjen, Bruno Dietrich, Bernhard Minetti, Tilla Durieux	Drama	a.k.a. Es. Entered into the 1966 Cannes Film Festival
It's the Geography That Counts	Rudolph Cartier	Peter Vogel, Heinz Ehrenfreund, Jochen Brockmann	Crime	a.k.a. Alibi für James. Austrian-West German co-production
Italienische Nacht	Michael Kehlmann	Hans Clarin, Herta Staal, Walter Kohut, Oskar Sima, Jane Tilden, Elisabeth Neumann-Viertel	Drama	
Jan Himp und die kleine Brise	Arthur Maria Rabenalt	Gila von Weitershausen, Ulli Lommel, Carl Lange	Comedy	
Jimmy Orpheus	Roland Klick	Klaus Schichan, Ortrud Beginnen	Drama	
Johannisnacht	Oswald Döpke	Hans Putz, Käthe Haack, Katinka Hoffmann, Benno Sterzenbach, Ruth Hausmeister, Walter Kohut	Fantasy	a.k.a. Dear Brutus
Jugendprozeß	Peter Hamel	Ulli Lommel, Werner Pochath, Gernot Endemann	Crime drama	a.k.a. Jugendprozess
Kein Freibrief für Mord	Karlheinz Bieber	Gisela Uhlen, Hermann Lenschau, Christian Doermer, Romuald Pekny, Günther Schramm, Marthe Keller	Crime drama	a.k.a. Licence to Murder
Kind Sir	Gerhard Metzner	Albert Lieven, Karin Jacobsen	Comedy	a.k.a. Ein netter Herr
Kiss Kiss, Kill Kill	Gianfranco Parolini	Tony Kendall, Brad Harris, Maria Perschy	Eurospy thriller	First of the Kommissar X film series. West German-Italian-Yugoslav co-production
Kommissar X – Drei gelbe Katzen	Rudolf Zehetgruber	Tony Kendall, Brad Harris, Ann Smyrner	Eurospy thriller	a.k.a. Death Is Nimble, Death Is Quick. Kommissar X film. West German-Italian-Austrian-French co-production
Kommissar X – In den Klauen des goldenen Drachen	Gianfranco Parolini	Tony Kendall, Brad Harris	Eurospy thriller	a.k.a. So Darling, So Deadly a.k.a. Agent Joe Walker: Operation Far East. Kommissar X film. West German-Italian-Austrian-Yugoslav-Singapore co-production
Kostenpflichtig zum Tode verurteilt	Georg Tressler	Ernst Stankovski, Doris Schade	Docudrama, Spy	a.k.a. Jerzy Sosnowski
Kubinke	Robert A. Stemmle	Ernst Jacobi, Gisela Fritsch, Anita Kupsch, Siegfried Schürenberg	Drama	
The Lark	Imo Moszkowicz	Elisabeth Schwarz, Fritz Wepper, Karl Michael Vogler, Hans Caninenberg	Drama	a.k.a. Jeanne oder Die Lerche
Das Leben ist schön	Erich Neureuther	Ilse Ritter, Günther Tabor	Comedy	a.k.a. La Vie est belle
Das Leben meines Bruders	Wilm ten Haaf	Charles E. Johnson, Helmut Förnbacher, Andreas Blum, Margot Philipp	Drama	
Leben wie die Fürsten	Helmut Käutner	Peter Pasetti, Hubert von Meyerinck, Michael Hinz	Comedy	
Letters to Lucerne	Jürgen Goslar	Marianne Hoppe, Katharina Matz, Irmgard Riessen, Barbara Stanek, Suzanne Doucet	Drama, War	
Die letzte Reise des Kapitän Scott	Dieter Lemmel	Werner Uschkurat	Docudrama	
Die Liebenden von Florenz	Wilhelm Semmelroth	Horst Janson, Almut Eggert	Drama	a.k.a. The Lovers of Florence
The Life in My Hands	Rolf von Sydow	Siegfried Wischnewski, Wolfgang Preiss, Michael Hinz	Drama	
Lili	Kurt Wilhelm	Uta Sax, Wolfgang Kieling, Harald Leipnitz, Ingrid van Bergen	Drama	a.k.a. Carnival a.k.a. Das Mädchen aus Mira
Liselotte of the Palatinate	Kurt Hoffmann	Heidelinde Weis, Harald Leipnitz, Hans Caninenberg	Historical	
Living It Up	Pierre Gaspard-Huit	Mireille Darc, Peter van Eyck, Paul Hubschmid, Jacques Charrier, Daniel Gélin	Drama	French-West German co-production
The Living Room	Korbinian Köberle	Ulli Philipp, Peter Pasetti, Wolfgang Büttner, Irmgard Först	Drama	a.k.a. Der letzte Raum
Long Legs, Long Fingers	Alfred Vohrer	Senta Berger, Martin Held, Joachim Fuchsberger, Hanns Lothar, James Robertson Justice	Crime comedy	
Ein Mädchen von heute	Dieter Finnern	Karin Baal, Hartmut Reck, Konrad Georg	Drama, Music	
Mafia – Die ehrenwerte Gesellschaft	František Čáp	Rolf Arndt, Walter Buschhoff, Jean Franval, Kurd Pieritz, Rolf Wanka, Boris Dvornik, Bert Sotlar, Miha Baloh, Demeter Bitenc, Branko Pleša, Zvonimir Rogoz, Veljko Maričić	Docudrama, Crime	
Maigret and His Greatest Case	Alfred Weidenmann	Heinz Rühmann, Françoise Prévost, Günther Stoll	Crime	a.k.a. Enter Inspector Maigret. West German-Austrian-French-Italian co-production
The Man from Brooklyn	Eberhard Itzenplitz	Karin Baal, Klaus Löwitsch, Hans Helmut Dickow	Thriller	
Man on the Spying Trapeze	Juan de Orduña	Wayde Preston, Helga Sommerfeld, Reinhard Kolldehoff	Spy	Spanish-West German-Italian co-production
Der Mann aus Melbourne	Wilm ten Haaf	Horst Tappert, Roma Bahn, Konrad Georg, Hannelore Elsner	Drama	a.k.a. The Claimant
Der Mann, der sich Abel nannte	Ludwig Cremer	Carl Raddatz, Ida Krottendorf, Rolf Boysen, Heinz Weiss, Ernst Fritz Fürbringer	Docudrama, Cold War spy film	a.k.a. Rudolf Abel
Mannerhouse	Fritz Umgelter	Paul Hoffmann, Hermann Treusch, Al Hoosman	Drama	
Das Märchen	Theodor Grädler	Christiane Hörbiger, Karl Walter Diess, Günther Tabor	Drama	a.k.a. The Fairy Tale
The Master Builder	Hans Schweikart	Peter Lühr, Andrea Jonasson, Inge Birkmann	Drama	a.k.a. Baumeister Solness
Melissa	Paul May	Ruth Maria Kubitschek, Günther Stoll, Siegfried Wischnewski	Mystery thriller	
A Memory of Two Mondays	Karl Fruchtmann	Horst Janson, Paul Dahlke, Bruni Löbel, Dirk Dautzenberg	Drama	
Das Millionending	Helmut Ashley	Helmut Wildt, Willi Rose, Horst Bollmann, Horst Niendorf, Walter Jokisch, Paul Esser	Crime	a.k.a. Rififi in Berlin
Miranda	Gerd Rösler	Chariklia Baxevanos	Comedy, Fantasy	
The Misunderstanding	Ludwig Cremer	Elisabeth Flickenschildt, Rolf Boysen	Drama	a.k.a. Das Missverständnis
Der Mitbürger	Rainer Wolffhardt	Ernst Jacobi	Crime	
Mourning Becomes Electra	Gerhard Klingenberg	Joana Maria Gorvin, Christoph Bantzer, Maria Wimmer, Werner Hinz, Rolf Boysen	Drama	
Münchhausen	Fritz Umgelter	Richard Münch	Drama	
The Murderer with the Silk Scarf	Adrian Hoven	Carl Möhner, Folco Lulli, Harald Juhnke	Crime	West German-Italian co-production
Musik	Hans Schweikart	Annemarie Düringer, Peter Pasetti, Doris Schade	Drama	
Der Neffe als Onkel	Hans-Christof Stenzel	Barbara Rütting, Werner Enke, Monika Peitsch, Simone Rethel	Comedy	a.k.a. Der Onkel als Neffe
Die Nibelungen	Harald Reinl	Uwe Beyer, Karin Dor, Herbert Lom, Maria Marlow, Siegfried Wischnewski, Rolf Henniger	Fantasy	a.k.a. Whom the Gods Wish to Destroy
Night of the Fourth	Konrad Wagner	Wolf Frees, Paul Edwin Roth	Crime	a.k.a. Die Nacht zum Vierten
Night School	Rainer Wolffhardt	Peer Schmidt, Karin Hübner	Crime comedy	a.k.a. Abendkurs
No Fixed Abode	Heinz Schimmelpfennig	Werner Pochath, Hubert Suschka	Drama	a.k.a. Ohne festen Wohnsitz
No Shooting Time for Foxes	Peter Schamoni	Helmut Förnbacher, Christian Doermer, Andrea Jonasson, Monika Peitsch, Willy Birgel	Drama	Won the Jury Grand Prix at the 16th Berlin International Film Festival
Nur einer wird leben	Fritz Umgelter	Werner Kreindl, Günter Mack	Thriller	a.k.a. La Vérité de minuit
Old Shaky	Günter Meincke	Kurt Hübner, Wolfgang Spier	Disaster	a.k.a. Texas Tower 4
Ollapotrida	Wolfgang Glück	Peter Vogel, Ernst Stankovski, Christiane Hörbiger, Erika Pluhar, Fritz Muliar	Comedy	Austrian-West German co-production
Once a Greek	Rolf Thiele	Heinz Rühmann, Irina Demick, Charles Régnier, Hannes Messemer	Comedy	
Onkel Filser – Allerneueste Lausbubengeschichten	Werner Jacobs	Hansi Kraus, Michl Lang, Elisabeth Flickenschildt, Rudolf Rhomberg, Heidelinde Weis, Beppo Brem	Comedy	
Operation Yellow Viper	Wolfgang Schleif	Hellmut Lange	Eurospy thriller	West German-Italian co-production
A Penny for a Song	Gerhard Klingenberg	Paul Hoffmann, Cornelia Froboess, Christoph Bantzer	Comedy	a.k.a. Wo wir fröhlich gewesen sind
Perlenkomödie	Fritz Umgelter	Claus Biederstaedt, Gerlinde Locker, Karl Walter Diess, Gudrun Thielemann	Comedy	
Pflicht ist Pflicht	Hans Dieter Schwarze	Paul Dahlke, Hanns Ernst Jäger	Crime comedy	
Playgirl	Will Tremper	Eva Renzi, Harald Leipnitz, Paul Hubschmid, Umberto Orsini	Drama	
The Pleasure Of Honesty	Hans Lietzau	Rolf Boysen, Gisela Stein, Lucie Mannheim, Konrad Georg	Comedy	a.k.a. Das Vergnügen, anständig zu sein
Pontius Pilate	Hagen Mueller-Stahl	Wolfgang Preiss, Leonard Steckel, Carl Lange, Dagmar Altrichter, Rolf Boysen	Drama	
Prairie-Saloon	Hans Heinrich	Violetta Ferrari, Gerd Vespermann, Reinhard Kolldehoff, Rainer Brandt, Beate Hasenau	Musical, Western	
The Price of Freedom	Egon Monk	Lutz Mackensy, András Fricsay, Ortwin Speer, Henning Venske, Fritz Hollenbeck, Eberhard Fechner	Drama	
A Profitable Position	Hans Dieter Schwarze	Fritz Wepper, Walter Richter	Comedy	a.k.a. Eine einträgliche Stelle
Quadrille	Rolf von Sydow	Eva Pflug, Dagmar Altrichter, Friedrich Schoenfelder, Horst Niendorf	Comedy	
The Rainmaker	Franz Peter Wirth	Liselotte Pulver, Stefan Wigger, Walter Richter, Helmut Schmid	Drama	
Rasputin	Robert A. Stemmle	Herbert Stass	Biography, History	
Das Rätsel von Foresthouse	Karlheinz Bieber	Christian Doermer, Horst Janson	Crime	
Die Rechnung – eiskalt serviert	Helmut Ashley	George Nader, Heinz Weiss, Richard Münch, Horst Tappert, Yvonne Monlaur, Walter Rilla	Thriller	a.k.a. Tip Not Included a.k.a. A Cold Blooded Affair. Jerry Cotton film. West German-French co-production
The Reluctant Peer	Rolf von Sydow	Ernst Fritz Fürbringer, Eva Maria Meineke, Hermann Lenschau, Sabine Eggerth, Michael Hinz	Comedy	a.k.a. Das Missgeschick, ein Lord zu sein
Requiem for a Secret Agent	Sergio Sollima	Stewart Granger, Daniela Bianchi, Peter van Eyck	Eurospy thriller	Italian-West German-Spanish co-production
Relative Values	Gerhard Klingenberg	Luise Ullrich, Louise Martini, Edith Heerdegen, Ernst Stankovski, Alexander Kerst, Lukas Ammann	Comedy	a.k.a. Wechselkurs der Liebe
Rette sich wer kann	Michael Kehlmann	Klausjürgen Wussow, Karin Anselm, Klaus Schwarzkopf	Comedy	a.k.a. Rette sich wer kann, oder: Dummheit siegt überall
Return of the Regiment	Hermann Fortuin	Werner Hinz, Harry Riebauer	Drama, War	a.k.a. Offiziersbankett
Der Richter von London	Dietrich Haugk	Alfred Schieske, Michael Hinz, Robert Meyn, Harry Wüstenhagen	Comedy	a.k.a. The Shoemaker's Holiday
Der Ritter vom Mirakel	Imo Moszkowicz	Michael Degen, Gertrud Kückelmann, Elisabeth Wiedemann, Heinz Schubert	Comedy	a.k.a. El caballero del milagro
Der Rivonia-Prozess	Jürgen Goslar	Simon Sabela	Docudrama	a.k.a. The Rivonia Trial
Robert and Elizabeth	Eberhard Schröder	Anton Walbrook, Ingeborg Hallstein, Peter Arens, Sabine Sinjen	Musical	
Robin Hood, der edle Räuber	Helmut Käutner	Hans von Borsody, Benno Hoffmann, Ingrid van Bergen	Musical, Adventure	
Ross	Michael Kehlmann	Klausjürgen Wussow, Hannes Messemer, Hans Clarin, Eric Pohlmann	Drama, War, Biography	a.k.a. Flieger Ross
Die rote Rosa	Franz Josef Wild	Ursula Lingen, Eric Pohlmann, Alexander Kerst, Rolf Boysen, Hans Putz, Hans Korte, Günther Neutze	Docudrama	a.k.a. Red Rosa a.k.a. Rosa Luxemburg – Die rote Rosa
S.O.S. – Morro Castle	Frank Wisbar	Wolfgang Kieling	Docudrama, Disaster	
Samba	William Dieterle	Helmuth Lohner, Helmut Qualtinger, Wolfgang Preiss, Albert Lieven, Eva Kerbler	Drama	
Ein Schloß	Franz Peter Wirth	Gerd Baltus, Herbert Fleischmann, Hubert Suschka, Wolfgang Engels	Crime	a.k.a. Ein Schloss a.k.a. The Castle a.k.a. Zámek
Der schwarze Freitag	August Everding	Curd Jürgens, Hans Christian Blech, Dieter Borsche, Wolfgang Neuss	Docudrama, History	
Die schwarze Hand	Günter Gräwert	Hans Korte, Herbert Ballmann, Christoph Bantzer	Docudrama	a.k.a. Black Hand
Secret Agent Super Dragon	Giorgio Ferroni	Ray Danton, Marisa Mell	Eurospy thriller	Italian-West German-French co-production
The Sinful Village	Werner Jacobs	Michl Lang, Gunther Philipp, Hans-Jürgen Bäumler, Hannelore Auer, Beppo Brem	Comedy	
Ski Fascination	Willy Bogner Jr.		Documentary, Sport	
Ski Fever	Curt Siodmak	Martin Milner, Claudia Martin, Toni Sailer, Vivi Bach, Dietmar Schönherr	Comedy	American-Austrian-Czechoslovak-West German co-production
Sozialaristokraten	Claus Peter Witt	Hans Deppe, Gert Haucke	Comedy	a.k.a. Socialaristokraten
The Spanish Fly	Erich Neureuther	Gunnar Möller, Monika Peitsch, Bum Krüger	Comedy	
Spätere Heirat erwünscht	Hans Dieter Schwarze	Grit Boettcher, Peter Pasetti, Luitgard Im, Elisabeth Wiedemann, Helen Vita	Anthology	a.k.a. Spätere Heirat erwünscht oder Pallü ist ein Spiel
Spätsommer	Eugen York	Martin Held, Johanna von Koczian, Fritz Tillmann	Comedy	
Sperrbezirk	Will Tremper	Suzanne Roquette, Harald Leipnitz, Karel Štěpánek	Drama	
Spielplatz	Wilm ten Haaf	Jan Koester, Walter Wilz, Ann Smyrner, Fritz Tillmann	Thriller	a.k.a. Not Before the Children
The Spy with Ten Faces	Alberto De Martino	Paul Hubschmid, Karin Dor, Vivi Bach	Eurospy thriller	Italian-West German co-production
Standgericht	Rolf Busch	Wolfgang Kieling, Heinz Giese, Tilo von Berlepsch, Friedrich Schütter, Hans Pössenbacher, Willy Maertens, Erik von Loewis, Franz Arzdorf, Katharina Brauren, Wolf Ackva, Eva Brumby	War	
Stop the World – I Want to Get Off	Imo Moszkowicz	Hanns Lothar, Violetta Ferrari	Musical	
The Strangler of the Tower	Hans Mehringer	Charles Régnier, Kai Fischer, Ady Berber	Crime	
Swan Lake	Film direction: Truck Branss, Choreography: Rudolf Nureyev	Margot Fonteyn, Rudolf Nureyev	Ballet	Austrian-West German-American co-production
Ein Tag in Paris	Georg Wildhagen	Horst Tappert, Jochen Brockmann, Walter Bluhm, Viktor de Kowa	Comedy	a.k.a. The Piggy Bank a.k.a. Pots of Money
Ein Tag ohne Morgen	Wilm ten Haaf	Eva Pflug, Hans Hinrich, Wolf Ackva, Violetta Ferrari	Drama	a.k.a. Le Bonheur des méchants
Das Tempelchen	Karl Fruchtmann	Ilse Ritter, Friedhelm Ptok, Hilde Körber, Herbert Fleischmann	Drama	
Thérèse Raquin	Hanns Korngiebel	Ingrid Andree, Ernst Jacobi	Drama	
To Damascus	Wilhelm Semmelroth	Wolfgang Büttner	Drama	a.k.a. The Road to Damascus
Tovarich	Wolfgang Liebeneiner	Karin Hübner, Peter Weck, Ernst Stankovski, Benno Sterzenbach, Gitte Hænning	Comedy	a.k.a. Towarisch
The Trap Snaps Shut at Midnight	Harald Philipp	George Nader, Heinz Weiss, Richard Münch, Horst Frank	Thriller	Jerry Cotton film. West German-French co-production
Tratsch im Treppenhaus	Hans Mahler	Heidi Kabel, Henry Vahl	Comedy	
Träume in der Mausefalle	Rolf von Sydow	Harald Leipnitz, Herbert Fleischmann, Günther Schramm, Rosemarie Fendel	Drama	a.k.a. The Keep
Treasure of San Gennaro	Dino Risi	Senta Berger, Nino Manfredi, Totò, Mario Adorf, Harry Guardino, Claudine Auger, Ralf Wolter	Crime comedy	Italian-West German-French co-production
Trials and Tribulations	Rudolf Noelte	Cordula Trantow, Christoph Bantzer	Drama	a.k.a. A Suitable Match a.k.a. On Tangled Paths a.k.a. Irrungen, Wirrungen
Triple Cross	Terence Young	Christopher Plummer, Yul Brynner, Romy Schneider, Gert Fröbe, Trevor Howard	War, Spy thriller	British-French-West German co-production
The Trygon Factor	Cyril Frankel	Stewart Granger, Susan Hampshire, Robert Morley, Brigitte Horney, Eddi Arent	Crime	Based on Edgar Wallace. West German-British co-production
Twilight Bar	Claus Peter Witt	Walter Kohut, Judy Winter, Stanislav Ledinek, Susi Nicoletti, Hans Peter Korff	Science fiction	a.k.a. Drei Tage bis Mitternacht
Two Girls from the Red Star	Sammy Drechsel	Curd Jürgens, Lilli Palmer, Pascale Petit, Daniel Gélin, Dieter Hildebrandt	Comedy	a.k.a. An Affair of States. West German-French-Austrian co-production
Two Like Us	Karl Hamrun	Susanne Beck, Tommi Piper, Konrad Georg	Drama	
Um Lucretia	Wolfgang Liebeneiner	Antje Weisgerber, Pinkas Braun, Robert Freitag, Lola Müthel, Berta Drews	Drama	a.k.a. Duel of Angels
The Upper Hand	Denys de La Patellière	Jean Gabin, George Raft, Gert Fröbe, Nadja Tiller, Mireille Darc, Claudio Brook, Marcel Bozzuffi	Crime	French-West German-Italian co-production
Die venezianische Tür	Walter Rilla	Heinz Moog, Margot Trooger, Claus Wilcke	Comedy	a.k.a. The Golden Entry
Der Verrat von Ottawa	Günter Gräwert	Werner Bruhns	Docudrama, Cold War spy film	
La Voleuse	Jean Chapot	Romy Schneider, Michel Piccoli, Hans Christian Blech	Drama	French-West German co-production
Volpone	Hansgünther Heyme	Walter Richter, Walter Kohut, Fritz Rasp	Comedy	a.k.a. Volpone oder Der Fuchs
Weiß gibt auf	Falk Harnack	Rudolf Platte, Siegfried Lowitz	Thriller	a.k.a. A Well Dressed Man
Die Welt des Wassers	Oswald Döpke	Gerd Baltus, Edith Schultze-Westrum, Ulli Philipp, Xenia Pörtner, Herbert Fleischmann	Drama	
What Every Woman Knows	Erich Neureuther	Charlotte Weninger, Fritz Wepper, Franziska Bronnen	Drama	a.k.a. Was jede Frau weiß
Who Killed Johnny R.?	José Luis Madrid	Lex Barker, Joachim Fuchsberger, Marianne Koch, Sieghardt Rupp, Ralf Wolter	Western	Spanish-West German co-production
Who'll Save the Plowboy?	Falk Harnack	Friedrich G. Beckhaus, Eva Pflug, Michael Degen	Drama	a.k.a. Wer rettet unseren Ackerknecht?
Wie wär's, Monsieur?	Rolf von Sydow	Dagmar Altrichter, Carl Lange, Karl-Georg Saebisch, Eva Maria Meineke, Fritz Wepper	Comedy	a.k.a. Croque-monsieur
Winnetou and Old Firehand	Alfred Vohrer	Rod Cameron, Pierre Brice, Marie Versini, Harald Leipnitz	Western	a.k.a. Thunder at the Border. Based on Karl May. West German-Yugoslav co-production
Winnetou and the Crossbreed	Harald Philipp	Lex Barker, Pierre Brice, Uschi Glas, Götz George, Ralf Wolter	Western	Based on Karl May. West German-Yugoslav co-production
Wir machen Musik – Eine kleine Harmonielehre	Karl Vibach	Hanns Lothar, Uta Sax	Musical	a.k.a. We Make Music
Witness Out of Hell	Žika Mitrović	Irene Papas, Heinz Drache, Daniel Gélin, Werner Peters	Drama	West German-Yugoslav co-production
Der Witzbold	Korbinian Köberle	Alfons Höckmann, Uta Hallant, Klaus Höhne	Drama	a.k.a. The Joker
Wo blieb Friedrich Weisgerber?	Tom Toelle	Herbert Tiede, Otto Graf, Günther Neutze	Drama, War	
Woyzeck	Rudolf Noelte	Hans Christian Blech, Maria Emo, Hermann Schomberg, Bernhard Minetti	Drama	
Yegor Bulychov and Others	Peter Beauvais	Werner Hinz, Edda Seippel, Ernst Jacobi, Stanislav Ledinek	Drama	a.k.a. Jegor Bulytschow und andere
Yesterday Girl	Alexander Kluge	Alexandra Kluge, Günter Mack, Hans Korte, Werner Kreindl, Alfred Edel	Drama	a.k.a. Abschied von gestern. Won a Silver Lion at the Venice Film Festival
Young Törless	Volker Schlöndorff	Mathieu Carrière, Barbara Steele	Drama	West German-French co-production
Your Money or Your Life	Jean-Pierre Mocky	Fernandel, Heinz Rühmann	Comedy	French-West German co-production
Z7 Operation Rembrandt	Giancarlo Romitelli	Lang Jeffries, Christiane Maybach, Joachim Hansen	Eurospy thriller	Italian-Spanish-West German co-production
Zehn Prozent	Theo Mezger	Klaus Schwarzkopf, Jochen Brockmann	Comedy	a.k.a. 10 %
Zeit der Kirschen	Otto Schenk	Boy Gobert, Senta Wengraf, Guido Wieland, Leopold Rudolf, Vilma Degischer, Matthias Fuchs, Gertraud Jesserer	Drama	a.k.a. Le Temps des cerises

== See also ==
- List of Austrian films of 1966
- List of East German films of 1966

== Bibliography ==
- Bergfelder, Tim. International Adventures: German Popular Cinema and European Co-Productions in the 1960s. Berghahn Books, 2005.
