= List of West German films of 1967 =

List of films produced in West Germany in 1967

List of West German films of 1967. Feature films produced and distributed in West Germany in 1967.

== 1967 ==
Title	Director	Cast	Genre	Notes
Abgründe	Peter Lilienthal	Elfriede Irrall, Else Quecke	Anthology	
Die Affäre Eulenburg	Fritz Umgelter	Richard Münch, Hans Caninenberg, Fritz Tillmann, Herbert Fleischmann, Ernst Fritz Fürbringer, Heinz Weiss	Docudrama	a.k.a. Die Affäre Eulenburg – Mechanismus eines Skandals
Also gut! Lassen wir uns scheiden!	Rolf von Sydow	Johanna Matz, Claus Biederstaedt, Karl Walter Diess	Comedy	a.k.a. Divorçons
Der Alte	Lutz Büscher	Paul Verhoeven, Hans Helmut Dickow, Lola Müthel	Drama	a.k.a. The Old Man
Anastasia	Robert A. Stemmle	Lotte Ledl, Leonard Steckel	Docudrama	
Antitoxin	Udo Langhoff	Konrad Georg	Biography	
Das Arrangement	Günter Gräwert	Luitgard Im, Alexander Kerst	Drama	
Asche und Glut	Korbinian Köberle	Walter Rilla, Hans Schweikart	Crime	a.k.a. Embers
Astoria	Peter Dörre	Peter Minich, Anita Höfer, Boy Gobert, Fritz Muliar	Musical	Austrian-West German-Swiss co-production
Das ausgefüllte Leben des Alexander Dubronski	Thomas Fantl	Horst Bollmann, Ida Krottendorf	Comedy	
Der Auswanderer	Edward Rothe	Hans Putz, Doris Schade, Krista Keller, Ulli Lommel, Benno Sterzenbach, Hubert Suschka, Martha Wallner, Hans Hinrich, Peter Capell, Lukas Ammann, Bum Krüger	Drama	a.k.a. L'Émigré de Brisbane
Ballad of a Gunman	Alfio Caltabiano	Anthony Ghidra, Angelo Infanti, Mario Novelli, Alfio Caltabiano, Monica Teuber, Ellen Schwiers	Western	Italian-West German co-production
Bäume sterben aufrecht	Joachim Hess	Dorothea Wieck, Karin Anselm, Friedhelm Ptok	Comedy	
Der Befehl	Edwin Zbonek	Emil Stöhr, Walter Rilla, Oskar Sima	Drama	Austrian-West German-Swiss co-production
Bericht eines Feiglings	Michael Kehlmann	Hannes Messemer, Eric Pohlmann	Cold War spy film	
Betrug der Zeiten	Wolfgang Liebeneiner	Alexander Engel, Elisabeth Kuhlmann	Drama	
Biedermann und die Brandstifter	Rainer Wolffhardt	Siegfried Lowitz, Bruni Löbel, Herbert Bötticher, Ruth Drexel	Black comedy	a.k.a. The Fire Raisers a.k.a. The Arsonists a.k.a. The Firebugs
Das Bild	Volker Vogeler	Gloria ter Braake	Drama	
Der Blinde	Leopold Lahola	Paul Neuhaus, Günther Neutze, Horst Naumann	Drama	
The Blood Demon	Harald Reinl	Christopher Lee, Karin Dor, Lex Barker, Carl Lange	Horror	a.k.a. The Torture Chamber of Dr. Sadism a.k.a. The Snake Pit and the Pendulum a.k.a. Castle of the Walking Dead
Blut floss auf Blendings Castle	Rolf von Sydow	Friedrich Joloff, Fritz Schulz, Herbert Bötticher, Alice Treff, Sabine Eggerth	Comedy	a.k.a. The Crime Wave at Blandings
Die Brücke von Remagen	Wolfgang Schleif	Claus Holm, Claus Wilcke	War	
Brückenallee Nr. 3	Rudolf Jugert	Friedrich Joloff, Hans Fitze, Jochen Brockmann, Kurt Ehrhardt, Rudolf Schündler	Docudrama, War	a.k.a. Brückenallee Nr. 3 – Das Propaganda-Imperium des Dritten Reiches
Busybody	Erik Ode	Grethe Weiser, Heinz Engelmann	Crime comedy	a.k.a. Keine Leiche ohne Lily
The Cactus Garden	Wilm ten Haaf	Hilde Krahl, Katinka Hoffmann	Drama	
Captain Brassbound's Conversion	Wolfgang Glück	Siegfried Wischnewski, Elfriede Kuzmany	Adventure	a.k.a. Kapitän Brassbounds Bekehrung
Carmen, Baby	Radley Metzger	Uta Levka, Claus Ringer, Carl Möhner, Barbara Valentin	Drama	American-West German-Yugoslav co-production
Castle in Sweden	Wolfgang Liebeneiner	Gerlinde Locker, Christian Wolff, Ernst Stankovski, Martin Hirthe, Antje Weisgerber, Ina Halley	Drama	a.k.a. Château en Suède
Cat and Mouse	Hansjürgen Pohland	Wolfgang Neuss, Lars Brandt, Peter Brandt, Ingrid van Bergen, Michael Hinz	Drama, War	
The Chalk Garden	Edward Rothe	Elfriede Kuzmany, Elisabeth Flickenschildt, Christiane Schröder, Robert Freitag, Willy Birgel	Drama	a.k.a. Der Kreidegarten
Chips with Everything	Fritz Umgelter	Volkert Kraeft, Volker Lechtenbrink, Martin Lüttge, Jörg Pleva, Helmut Förnbacher, Günter Mack, Rolf Becker	Drama	a.k.a. Bratkartoffeln inbegriffen
Clint the Stranger	Alfonso Balcázar	George Martin, Marianne Koch, Gerhard Riedmann, Pinkas Braun, Fernando Sancho, Walt Barnes	Western	Italian-Spanish-West German co-production
Colleague Crampton	Wilhelm Semmelroth	Alfred Schieske, Rolf Becker, Barbara Schöne, Stanislav Ledinek	Comedy	a.k.a. Kollege Crampton
The Collection	Rainer Geis	Horst Tappert, Hartmut Reck	Drama	a.k.a. Die Kollektion
The College Girl Murders	Alfred Vohrer	Joachim Fuchsberger, Uschi Glas, Grit Boettcher, Siegfried Schürenberg	Mystery thriller	a.k.a. Der Mönch mit der Peitsche. Based on Edgar Wallace
Colonel Chabert	Ludwig Cremer	Kurt Ehrhardt, Ernst Stankovski, Rosl Schäfer, Herbert Fleischmann, Friedrich Joloff	Drama	
A Crack in the Ice	Günter Gräwert	Martin Benrath, Paul Dahlke, Herbert Fleischmann, Klaus Löwitsch, Herbert Bötticher, Ernst Fritz Fürbringer	Drama	a.k.a. Ein Riß im Eis a.k.a. Ein Riss im Eis
Creature with the Blue Hand	Alfred Vohrer	Klaus Kinski, Harald Leipnitz, Diana Körner, Siegfried Schürenberg	Mystery thriller	Based on Edgar Wallace
The Cruel Day	Hagen Mueller-Stahl	Heinz Drache, Eva Pflug	War	a.k.a. Entscheidung
Crumbles letzte Chance	Erik Ode	Rudolf Platte	Drama	a.k.a. The Song of a March Hare
The Cuckoo Years	George Moorse	Rolf Zacher, Franziska Oehme, Ardy Strüwer, Hubert von Meyerinck, Dunja Rajter	Drama	
The Dance of Death	Michael Verhoeven	Lilli Palmer, Paul Verhoeven, Karl Michael Vogler	Drama	
Date for a Murder	Mino Guerrini	George Ardisson, Hans von Borsody, Günther Stoll	Crime thriller	Italian-West German co-production
The Day the Children Vanished	Eugen York	Alfred Balthoff, Ulli Philipp, Peter Carsten, Benno Hoffmann	Thriller	
Dead Run	Christian-Jaque	Peter Lawford, Ira von Fürstenberg, Georges Géret, Maria Grazia Buccella, Horst Frank, Wolfgang Preiss, Werner Peters, Herbert Fux	Spy thriller	French-West German-Italian-American co-production
The Death of a Double	Rolf Thiele	Jürgen Draeger, Werner Pochath, Ivan Desny	Thriller	West German-Belgian co-production
Death Trip	Rudolf Zehetgruber	Tony Kendall, Brad Harris, Olga Schoberová, Dietmar Schönherr	Eurospy thriller	a.k.a. Kill Me Gently. Kommissar X film. West German-Italian co-production
A Degree of Murder	Volker Schlöndorff	Anita Pallenberg, Hans Peter Hallwachs, Werner Enke	Crime drama	a.k.a. Mord und Totschlag. 2 wins and entered into the 1967 Cannes Film Festival
Delirium for Two	Peter Schulze-Rohr	Wanda Rotha, Wolf Frees	Drama	a.k.a. Delirium zu zweit auf unbegrenzte Zeit
The Devil and the Good Lord	Peter Beauvais	Klausjürgen Wussow, Siegfried Wischnewski, Ernst Jacobi, Ingmar Zeisberg, Ursula Lingen, Helmut Käutner	Drama	
Dieser Mann und Deutschland	Heinz von Cramer, Hansjürgen Pohland	Gisela Trowe, Wolfgang Wahl, Peter Brogle, Willi Rose, Joachim Hansen, Herbert Fleischmann, Klaus Schwarzkopf	Drama	
Dieser Platonow	Oswald Döpke	Martin Benrath, Lola Müthel, Christine Wodetzky, Claudia Wedekind, Hans Korte, Günter Strack	Drama	a.k.a. Platonov
Dirty Heroes	Alberto De Martino	Frederick Stafford, Daniela Bianchi, Curd Jürgens, Helmuth Schneider, Adolfo Celi, Michel Constantin, John Ireland, Anthony Dawson	War	Italian-West German-French co-production
Drei Rosen aus Papier	Ulrich Lauterbach	Cordula Trantow, Hellmut Lange	Drama	
Der Dreispitz	Rainer Erler	Chariklia Baxevanos, Hans Dieter Zeidler, Robert Meyn	Comedy	a.k.a. The Three-Cornered Hat
The Drinker	Dietrich Haugk	Siegfried Lowitz	Drama	a.k.a. The Drunkard
Der dritte Handschuh	Eberhard Itzenplitz	Sabine Eggerth, Willi Rose, Mady Rahl	Mystery thriller	
Eiszeit der Liebe	Imo Moszkowicz	Harald Leipnitz, Erika Remberg, Peter Weck, Karin Eickelbaum	Comedy	a.k.a. Petticoat Fever
Es bleibt unter uns	Eberhard Itzenplitz	Fred Maire, Ursula Dirichs, Friedrich W. Bauschulte, Alf Marholm, Hans Hinrich	Thriller	
Ever Since Paradise	Claus Peter Witt	Grit Boettcher, Hanne Wieder, Karl Schönböck, Ilse Ritter	Comedy	a.k.a. Paradies auf Erden
Fast ein Held	Rainer Erler	Martin Held, Pascale Petit	War	a.k.a. Almost a Hero
Five Golden Dragons	Jeremy Summers	Robert Cummings, Margaret Lee, Sieghardt Rupp, Klaus Kinski, Maria Perschy, Christopher Lee, George Raft, Dan Duryea	Thriller	British-West German co-production
Ein Florentiner Hut	Kurt Wilhelm	Gerd Vespermann, Karin Anselm, Gerlinde Locker	Comedy	a.k.a. The Italian Straw Hat
Die Flucht nach Holland	Ludwig Cremer	Hans Caninenberg, Ernst Fritz Fürbringer, Ernst Schröder, Rudolf Fernau, Karl John, Paul Dahlke	Docudrama, War	
Flucht ohne Ausweg	Franz Peter Wirth	Hansjörg Felmy, Karin Hübner, Peter Ehrlich	Crime	
Flucht über die Ostsee	Frank Wisbar	Heinz Engelmann, Wolfgang Büttner, Franz Rudnick, Dieter Eppler	War, Docudrama	
Flying Sand	Karlheinz Bieber	Karl Michael Vogler, Wolfgang Kieling, Hartmut Reck, Helmut Förnbacher, Jürgen Draeger, Arthur Brauss	War, Adventure drama	
Forty Eight Hours to Acapulco	Klaus Lemke	Dieter Geissler, Christiane Krüger, Teddy Stauffer	Crime	a.k.a. 48 Hours to Acapulco
The Foundling	George Moorse	Julie Felix, Rudolf Fernau, Titus Gerhardt	Drama	
Frank V	Friedrich Dürrenmatt	Hubert von Meyerinck, Therese Giehse, Hans Korte	Musical	
Das Fräulein	Hans Bachmüller	Antje Hagen	Drama	
Freitag muß es sein	Korbinian Köberle	Günther Ungeheuer, Brigitte Grothum, Hans Caninenberg	Crime	a.k.a. The Perfect Friday a.k.a. Freitag muss es sein
Frühling in Baden-Baden	Robert A. Stemmle	Günther Schramm, Peer Schmidt, Gisela Fritsch, Hubert von Meyerinck, Fita Benkhoff	Musical	
Der Garten	Rolf von Sydow	Edith Heerdegen, Alfred Schieske	Drama	a.k.a. The Garden
Die Gefährtin	Thomas Fantl	Siegfried Lowitz, Paul Edwin Roth	Comedy	
Gerhard Langhammer und die Freiheit	Rolf Busch	Henning Gissel	Drama	
Girls, Girls	Roger Fritz	Helga Anders, Jürgen Jung, Hellmut Lange	Drama	
Glorious Times at the Spessart Inn	Kurt Hoffmann	Liselotte Pulver, Harald Leipnitz, Hubert von Meyerinck, Willy Millowitsch, Vivi Bach, Hannelore Elsner	Comedy	
Gottes zweite Garnitur	Paul Verhoeven	Jimmy Powell, Monika Madras	Drama	a.k.a. The Lonely Conqueror
The Government Inspector	Gustav Rudolf Sellner	Hans Clarin, Alfred Schieske, Joseph Offenbach	Comedy	a.k.a. The Inspector General a.k.a. Der Revisor
Grand Slam	Giuliano Montaldo	Janet Leigh, Edward G. Robinson, Robert Hoffmann, Klaus Kinski, Adolfo Celi	Crime thriller	Italian-Spanish-West German co-production
A Handful of Heroes	Fritz Umgelter	Horst Frank, Valeria Ciangottini, Rolf Becker, Volkert Kraeft, Martin Lüttge, Jörg Pleva	Historical War	a.k.a. The Last Company. West German-Italian co-production
The Heathens of Kummerow	Werner Jacobs	Paul Dahlke, Ralf Wolter, Theo Lingen	Comedy	1st co-production between East & West Germany
Heiraten ist immer ein Risiko	Arno Assmann	Carl-Heinz Schroth, Edith Heerdegen, Heinz Bennent, Bruno Hübner	Crime comedy	
Helga	Erich F. Bender	Ruth Gassmann	Documentary	a.k.a. Helga: The Intimate Life of a Young Woman
Henry IV	Thomas Engel	Rolf Henniger, Gisela Fischer, Horst Tappert	Drama	
Herbst der Gammler	Peter Fleischmann		Documentary	
Heubodengeflüster	Rolf Olsen	Gunther Philipp, Ralf Wolter, Ann Smyrner, Peter Carsten, Trude Herr, Willy Millowitsch	Comedy	
Heydrich in Prag	Rolf Hädrich	Martin Benrath, Fritz Wepper, Günter Strack, Klaus Schwarzkopf, Hellmut Lange, Hans Jaray	Docudrama, War	
Hochspannung	Herbert Ballmann	Sieghardt Rupp, Ruth Maria Kubitschek	Drama	
Hot Pavements of Cologne	Ernst Hofbauer	Richard Münch, Walter Kohut, Arthur Brauss, Doris Kunstmann, Klaus Löwitsch, Claus Ringer, Dirk Dautzenberg	Crime	
Hotel Clausewitz	Ralph Habib	Wolfgang Kieling, Maria Brockerhoff, Friedrich Schoenfelder, Herbert Fux	Cold War spy film	a.k.a. Pension Clausewitz
The House of 1,000 Dolls	Jeremy Summers	Vincent Price, Martha Hyer, George Nader, Ann Smyrner, Wolfgang Kieling, Herbert Fux	Thriller	Spanish-West German co-production
Hugenberg: Gegen die Republik	Rudolf Jugert	Hans Fitze, Dieter Borsche, Heinz Engelmann	History, Biography	
Ich will Mjussow sprechen	Rolf von Sydow	Joachim Teege, Sabine Eggerth, Karin Jacobsen, Jane Tilden	Comedy	
In aller Stille	Thomas Fantl	Diana Körner, Gerhard Borman, Wolfgang Engels	Drama	
In Lemgo 89	Hagen Mueller-Stahl	Karl Michael Vogler, Wolfgang Büttner, Doris Schade, Iris Erdmann	Historical drama	
In Sachen Erzberger gegen Helfferich	Paul May	Helmut Peine, Heinz Weiss, Dieter Borsche	Docudrama	
Ist er gut? – Ist er böse?	Wolfgang Glück	Horst Tappert, Chariklia Baxevanos, Krista Keller, Harald Juhnke, Gisela Trowe	Comedy	a.k.a. Est-il bon? Est-il méchant?
Jack of Diamonds	Don Taylor	George Hamilton, Joseph Cotten, Marie Laforêt, Lilli Palmer, Carroll Baker, Wolfgang Preiss	Crime comedy	American-West German co-production
Jacobowsky and the Colonel	Rainer Wolffhardt	Horst Bollmann, Peter Pasetti, Johanna von Koczian	War, Comedy	
Jim Valentines großer Coup	Hans Heinrich	Claus Wilcke, Eric Pohlmann	Musical	a.k.a. A Retrieved Reformation
John Gabriel Borkman	Werner Schlechte	Heinz Moog, Angela Salloker, Inge Birkmann, Barbara Rütting, Joachim Ansorge, Ilona Grübel	Drama	
Johnny Banco	Yves Allégret	Horst Buchholz, Sylva Koscina	Crime comedy	French-Italian-West German co-production
Josephine	Korbinian Köberle	Sonja Ziemann, Udo Vioff, Charles Régnier	Biography	
Kabale und Liebe	Gerhard Klingenberg	Maresa Hörbiger, Willi Kowalj, Uta Sax	Drama	a.k.a. Intrigue and Love
Kampf um Kautschuk	Falk Harnack	Klausjürgen Wussow	Adventure	
Keine Angst vor Kolibris	Wolfgang Liebeneiner	Hans Clarin, Ulli Philipp	Crime comedy	a.k.a. La Bonne Planque
Kennwort Kettenhund	Theodor Grädler	Andrea Dahmen, Alf Marholm	Cold War spy film	
Kopfstand, Madam!	Christian Rischert	Miriam Spoerri, Herbert Fleischmann, Heinz Bennent	Drama	a.k.a. Headstand, Madam!
Kurzer Prozess	Michael Kehlmann	Helmut Qualtinger	Crime	a.k.a. Investigations Are Proceeding
L. D. Trotzki – Tod im Exil	August Everding	Peter Lühr, Hannes Messemer, Michael Degen	Docudrama	a.k.a. Das Attentat – L. D. Trotzki
The Last Ones	Oswald Döpke	Wolfgang Engels, Claudia Wedekind, Loni von Friedl, Horst Janson, Hartmut Reck, Carl Lange, Alice Treff	Drama	a.k.a. Die Letzten
The Last Paradises: On the Track of Rare Animals	Eugen Schuhmacher		Documentary	
Let It Ride	Rolf von Sydow	Gunnar Möller, Günter Pfitzmann, Anita Kupsch, Inge Brück, Hans W. Hamacher, Stanislav Ledinek	Musical comedy	a.k.a. Auf Sieg? Auf Platz? – Auf Liebe!
Lichtschacht	Hans Dieter Schwarze	Elisabeth Wiedemann, Evi Müller, Udo Vioff	Drama	a.k.a. The Rope Dancers
Little Lambs Eat Ivy	Georg Wildhagen	Luise Ullrich, Ulli Philipp, Karin Anselm, Gerd Baltus, Horst Bollmann, Ernst Fritz Fürbringer	Comedy	a.k.a. Willst Du nicht das Lämmlein hüten?
Lobby Doll und die Sitzstangen-Affäre	Joachim Roering	Hans Putz, Ellen Schwiers, Paul Edwin Roth, Henning Schlüter	Comedy	
The Lodger	Wolf Dietrich	Pinkas Braun	Thriller	a.k.a. Der Mieter
Lord Arthur Savile's Crime	Rolf von Sydow	Christoph Bantzer, Günther Schramm	Comedy	
Lösegeld für Mylady	Georg Wildhagen	Lil Dagover, Peter Kraus, Hans Caninenberg, Heinz Schubert, Klaus Höhne, Jochen Brockmann, Dunja Rajter	Musical comedy	
Lotus Flowers for Miss Quon	Jürgen Roland	Lang Jeffries, Francesca Tu, Werner Peters, Daniel Emilfork	Thriller	West German-French-Italian co-production
Love from a Stranger	Kurt Früh	Heinz Bennent, Gertrud Kückelmann	Thriller	a.k.a. Ein Fremder klopft an
Love Nights in the Taiga	Harald Philipp	Thomas Hunter, Marie Versini	Cold War spy film	a.k.a. Code Name: Kill
Love Thy Neighbour	Egil Kolstø	Walter Giller, Ghita Nørby, Vivi Bach, Christina Schollin, Dirch Passer	Comedy	Danish-West German co-production
La lunga sfida	Nino Zanchin	George Ardisson, Sieghardt Rupp, Katrin Schaake	Thriller	Italian-West German co-production
Lust for Love	Edgar Reitz	Heidi Stroh, Georg Hauke	Drama	a.k.a. Table for Love a.k.a. Mahlzeiten
Ein Mädchenleben für Wind	Karl Fruchtmann	Klausjürgen Wussow, Ilse Ritter, Erich Schellow, Antje Weisgerber, Friedhelm Ptok	Drama	a.k.a. Sacrifice to the Wind
A Man of God	Oswald Döpke	Carl Lange, Lola Müthel, Konrad Georg, Claudia Wedekind	Drama	a.k.a. Ein Mann Gottes
Maneater of Hydra	Mel Welles	Cameron Mitchell, Kai Fischer, Elisa Montés, George Martin	Horror	a.k.a. Island of the Doomed a.k.a. The Blood Suckers. Spanish-West German co-production
Ein Mann, der nichts gewinnt	Georg Tressler	Friedrich G. Beckhaus	Drama	
Marat/Sade	Peter Schulze-Rohr	Charles Régnier, Hans Christian Blech	Drama	a.k.a. The Persecution and Assassination of Jean-Paul Marat as Performed by the Inmates of the Asylum of Charenton Under the Direction of the Marquis de Sade
Midsummer Night	Paul May	Robert Fuller, Ruth Maria Kubitschek, Carl Lange, Sieghardt Rupp	Drama	
Mike Blaubart	Gerd Winkler	Hans Korte, Günter Mack, Ulli Philipp, Hanns Dieter Hüsch	Comedy	a.k.a. Mike Bluebeard
The Mission	Ludwig Cremer	Martin Held, Marianne Hoppe, Richard Münch, Martin Benrath	Drama	
Mission Stardust	Primo Zeglio	Lang Jeffries, Essy Persson, Pinkas Braun, Ann Smyrner, Joachim Hansen	Science fiction	Perry Rhodan film. Italian-West German-Spanish co-production
More Stately Mansions	Kurt Meisel	Walther Reyer, Ursula Lingen, Käthe Gold	Drama	a.k.a. Alle Reichtümer der Welt
Mr. Arcularis	Fritz Umgelter	Richard Münch	Mystery	
Murderers Club of Brooklyn	Werner Jacobs	George Nader, Heinz Weiss, Richard Münch, Helga Anders, Karel Štěpánek	Thriller	Jerry Cotton film
Nach all den Jahren	Erik Ode	Sonja Ziemann, Charles Régnier	Drama	a.k.a. In Loving Memory
The Narrowing Stream	Johannes Schaaf	Rosemarie Fendel, Ulrich Matschoss, Max Eckard, Norbert Kappen	Thriller	a.k.a. Der Mann aus dem Bootshaus
Nathan the Wise	Franz Peter Wirth	Kurt Ehrhardt, Siegfried Wischnewski, Wolfgang Reichmann, Paul Hoffmann, Monika Peitsch, Klaus Schwarzkopf	Drama	
Next Year, Same Time	Ulrich Schamoni	Sabine Sinjen, Ulla Jacobsson, Hans Dieter Schwarze	Drama	a.k.a. Alle Jahre wieder. Won the Jury Grand Prix at the 17th Berlin International Film Festival
The Nibelungs	Wilhelm Semmelroth	Gerd Seid, Antje Weisgerber, Lola Müthel, Alfred Schieske, Hans Caninenberg, Helmut Peine, Gerda Maurus	Drama	a.k.a. Die Nibelungen
Oedipus Rex	Oswald Döpke	Wolfgang Reichmann, Angela Salloker, Hans Christian Blech, Bernhard Minetti	Drama	
Operation St. Peter's	Lucio Fulci	Edward G. Robinson, Heinz Rühmann, Jean-Claude Brialy, Lando Buzzanca, Wolfgang Kieling, Herbert Fux	Crime comedy	Italian-French-West German co-production
A Palm Tree in a Rose Garden	Claus Peter Witt	Inge Meysel, Margot Philipp, Gundolf Willer, Gisela Trowe, Gerhard Riedmann	Drama	a.k.a. Palme im Rosengarten
Der Panamaskandal	Paul Verhoeven	Paul Hoffmann, Martin Benrath, Horst Tappert, Peter Pasetti, Rosemarie Fendel, Gisela Uhlen	Docudrama	a.k.a. The Panama Scandal
Der Paukenspieler	Bernhard Wicki, Volker Schlöndorff, Rolf Thiele, Franz Seitz, Helmut Meewes, Herbert Rimbach	Helmut Qualtinger, Heidelinde Weis, Helmuth Lohner, Werner Hinz, Hansi Kraus	Anthology	released 1981
The Peking Medallion	James Hill, Frank Winterstein	Elke Sommer, Robert Stack, Nancy Kwan, Werner Peters	Eurospy thriller, Adventure	a.k.a. The Corrupt Ones. West German-French-Italian co-production
Peter Schlemihl	Peter Beauvais	Götz George, Rudolf Platte, Albert Lieven	Fantasy	
Phaedra	Oswald Döpke	Joana Maria Gorvin, Rolf Henniger, Wilhelm Borchert, Luitgard Im, Lina Carstens	Drama	a.k.a. Phädra
Philadelphia, Here I Come!	Karl Fruchtmann	Peter Striebeck, Karl Hellmer, Berta Drews, Bruni Löbel, Wolfgang Büttner	Drama	a.k.a. Philadelphia, ich bin da!
Postlagernd Opernball – Die Affäre Redl	Robert A. Stemmle	Erich Auer, Heinrich Schweiger, Guido Wieland	Docudrama, Spy	
A Premeditated Crime	Peter Lilienthal	Willy Semmelrogge, Vadim Glowna	Mystery	a.k.a. Crimes with Intent
The Public Prosecutor	Hans Dieter Schwarze	Paul Hoffmann, Anaid Iplicjian, Paul Dahlke, Klaus Schwarzkopf, Carl Lange, Udo Vioff	Drama	a.k.a. Der öffentliche Ankläger
Der Querkopf	Karlheinz Bieber	Paul Dahlke	Comedy	a.k.a. Hippo Dancing
Der rasende Reporter – Egon Erwin Kisch	Robert A. Stemmle	Heinrich Schweiger	Biography	
Das Rasthaus der grausamen Puppen	Rolf Olsen	Essy Persson, Helga Anders, Erik Schumann, Margot Trooger, Ellen Schwiers	Crime	a.k.a. The Devil's Girls a.k.a. Inn of the Gruesome Dolls. West German-Italian co-production
Der Reichstagsbrandprozess	Tom Toelle	Václav Voska, Werner Kreindl, Jules Hamel, P. Walter Jacob, Klaus Löwitsch, Richard Lauffen, Heinz Meier, Hans Hinrich	Docudrama, History	
Release	Edwin Zbonek	Johanna von Koczian, Karl-Heinz Martell, Emil Stöhr	Drama	a.k.a. Nach der Entlassung. Austrian-West German co-production
Der Renegat	Gedeon Kovács	Paul Dahlke, Walter Kohut	Comedy, Fantasy	a.k.a. Non si dorme a Kirkwall
Rheinsberg	Kurt Hoffmann	Cornelia Froboess, Christian Wolff	Romantic comedy	
Der Röhm-Putsch	Günter Gräwert	Hans Korte	Docudrama, History	a.k.a. The Night of the Long Knives
Romy: Anatomy of a Face	Hans-Jürgen Syberberg	Romy Schneider	Documentary	
Rückfahrt	Willy van Hemert	Benno Sterzenbach, Werner Pochath, Christine Wodetzky	Drama	a.k.a. Too Old for Donkeys
A Scent of Flowers	Peter Beauvais	Sabine Sinjen, Ulrich Schamoni, Gerd Böckmann, Joseph Offenbach, Arno Assmann	Drama	a.k.a. Ein Duft von Blumen
Das Schiff nach Valparaiso	Dieter Reible	Anneli Granget, Udo Vioff	Drama	a.k.a. The Last of the English Visitors
Schleicher – General der letzten Stunde	Rainer Wolffhardt	Siegfried Wischnewski, Friedrich Schoenfelder	Docudrama	
The School for Wives	Otto Tausig	Cornelia Froboess, Karl-Maria Schley	Comedy	a.k.a. Die Schule der Frauen
Der Schpunz	Günther Fleckenstein	Peter Striebeck, Christiane Maybach, Renate Heilmeyer, Robert Meyn	Comedy	a.k.a. Le Schpountz
Das schwedische Zündholz	Gerhard Klingenberg	Ellen Schwiers, Rudolf Vogel, Günther Jerschke	Crime	
The Sea Is Boiling Hot	Klaus Wagner	Wolf Richards, Kristopher Kum	War	a.k.a. Kataki – Der Feind
Second Hand Virgin	Ákos Ráthonyi	Helga Sommerfeld, Wolfgang Preiss, Ingrid van Bergen, Joseph Offenbach	Crime	
Selbstbedienung	Eberhard Fechner	Wolfgang Condrus, Jürgen Draeger	Crime	
Sieben Wochen auf dem Eis	Fritz Umgelter	Günter Mack, Claus Biederstaedt, Volkert Kraeft, Werner Kreindl, Jörg Pleva, Günter Strack, Hellmut Lange, Martin Lüttge, Heinz Weiss, Klaus Schwarzkopf, Rolf Becker, Alexander Kerst, Carl Lange	Disaster, Adventure	a.k.a. 7 Wochen auf dem Eis a.k.a. Nobile
Siedlung Arkadien	Hans Dieter Schwarze	Stefan Wigger, Grit Boettcher, Horst Bollmann, Lil Dagover, Rudolf Forster	Comedy	
Silo 15	Hans Dieter Schwarze	Hannes Messemer, Günter Strack	Drama	Based on an Australian screenplay, two years before the English-language film
Slatin Pascha	Wolfgang Schleif	Christian Ghera, Stanislav Ledinek, Kurd Pieritz, Lutz Moik	Biography, Adventure	a.k.a. Slatin Pasha
A Sleep of Prisoners	Falk Harnack	Paul Dahlke, Hellmut Lange, Fritz Wepper, Walter Buschhoff	War, Drama	
The Smooth Career	Haro Senft	Bruno Ganz, Verena Buss, Wolfgang Büttner	Drama	a.k.a. The Easy Way Out
So war Herr Brummell	Fritz Umgelter	Boy Gobert, Heinrich Schweiger, Al Hoosman, Hans Mahnke, Edith Heerdegen	Biography	
Die spanische Puppe	Helmut Käutner	Sabine Sinjen, Margot Trooger, Max Eckard	Crime	a.k.a. The Double Doll
Spiel mit dem Tode	Karlheinz Bieber	Paul Dahlke, Karl Michael Vogler, Hannelore Elsner, Heinz Schubert	Comedy	
Spy Today, Die Tomorrow	Franz Josef Gottlieb	Lex Barker, Maria Perschy, Amedeo Nazzari, Brad Harris, Wolfgang Preiss, Eddi Arent	Eurospy thriller	a.k.a. Mister Dynamit – Morgen küßt Euch der Tod. West German-Italian-Spanish co-production
St. Pauli Between Night and Morning	José Bénazéraf	Eva Christian, Helmut Förnbacher, Dunja Rajter, Rolf Eden	Crime	West German-French co-production
Stella	Helmut Käutner	Johanna Matz, Gisela Mattishent, Sebastian Fischer, Ulli Philipp	Drama	
Stine	Wilm ten Haaf	Ilse Ritter, Richard Rüdiger, Maria Körber, Hans Caninenberg	Drama	
Stunde der Nachtigallen	Thomas Fantl	Gisela Peltzer, Doris Kunstmann, Joachim Hansen	Thriller	
Tagebücher	Kurt Wilhelm	Ulli Philipp, Christian Wolff, Erik Ode, Dagmar Altrichter, Claudia Wedekind	Comedy	a.k.a. I Diari
Target Frankie	José Antonio de la Loma	Joachim Fuchsberger, Eddi Arent	Eurospy thriller	Spanish-West German-Italian co-production
Tattoo	Johannes Schaaf	Christof Wackernagel, Helga Anders, Alexander May, Rosemarie Fendel	Drama	Entered into the 17th Berlin International Film Festival
Tea and Sympathy	Trude Kolman	Christiane Hörbiger, Stefan Behrens, Konrad Georg	Drama	a.k.a. Tee und etwas Sympathie
The Teahouse of the August Moon	Paul Martin, Eugen York	Dietmar Schönherr, Francesca Tu, Rudolf Platte, Hans W. Hamacher, Ralf Wolter	Comedy	a.k.a. Das kleine Teehaus
Tender Sharks	Michel Deville	Anna Karina, Mario Adorf, Gérard Barray, Scilla Gabel	Comedy	French-Italian-West German co-production
Three Years	Eberhard Itzenplitz	Franz Kollasch, Christiane Bruhn	Drama	a.k.a. Drei Jahre
Thunder Rock	Kurt Wilhelm	Günther Ungeheuer	Drama	a.k.a. Leuchtfeuer
Till Eulenspiegel	Martin Frič	Helmuth Lohner, Catherine Schell	Comedy	
Der Tod des Engelbert Dollfuß	Franz Peter Wirth	Kurt Zips, Ernst Stankovski, Karl Schönböck, Rudolf Lenz, Werner Kreindl, Bert Fortell, Kurt Nachmann	Docudrama	a.k.a. The Death of Engelbert Dollfuss
Der Tod des Sokrates	Walter Rilla	Heinz Moog	Drama	
Der Tod eines Mitbürgers	Edward Rothe	Almut Eggert, Joachim Ansorge, Fritz Tillmann, Karin Eickelbaum, Helmut Peine	Drama	
Der Tod läuft hinterher	Wolfgang Becker	Joachim Fuchsberger, Marianne Koch, Elisabeth Flickenschildt, Pinkas Braun	Mystery thriller	
Ein Toter braucht kein Alibi	Karlheinz Bieber	Wolfgang Kieling, Eva Pflug, Karl Michael Vogler	Crime	a.k.a. Misfire
Trace of a Girl	Gustav Ehmck	Thekla Carola Wied	Drama	
Tragedy in a Temporary Town	Günter Gräwert	Werner Schumacher, Friedrich G. Beckhaus, Benno Hoffmann, Peter Kuiper, Susanne Beck, Ruth Maria Kubitschek	Drama	a.k.a. Tragödie in einer Wohnwagenstadt
Tränen trocknet der Wind…	H. G. Schier	Margarethe von Trotta, Günter Becker	Crime drama	
Die Trennung	Tom Toelle	Cordula Trantow, Joachim Ansorge	Drama	
Ein treuer Diener seines Herrn	Wilhelm Semmelroth	Heinz Moog, Brigitte Grothum, Ellen Schwiers	Drama	
The Trial of Joan of Arc at Rouen, 1431	Peter Palitzsch	Rita Leska, Carl Lange, Hans Mahnke, Fritz Rasp	Drama	a.k.a. Der Prozess der Jeanne d’Arc zu Rouen 1431
Trumpets and Drums	Harry Buckwitz	Klausjürgen Wussow, Grit Boettcher, Siegfried Lowitz	Musical	a.k.a. Pauken und Trompeten
Umsonst	Michael Kehlmann	Fritz Eckhardt, Peter Weck, Helmut Qualtinger	Comedy	
The Unprecedented Defence of the Fortress Deutschkreuz	Werner Herzog		Short	
Untamable Angelique	Bernard Borderie	Michèle Mercier, Robert Hossein, Roger Pigaut, Sieghardt Rupp, Bruno Dietrich, Christian Rode	Adventure	French-Italian-West German co-production
Valentin Katajews chirurgische Eingriffe in das Seelenleben des Dr. Igor Igorowitsch	Helmut Käutner	Peter Vogel, Monika Peitsch, Helmut Käutner	Comedy	
The Vengeance of Fu Manchu	Jeremy Summers	Christopher Lee, Douglas Wilmer, Horst Frank, Wolfgang Kieling, Peter Carsten	Thriller	British-West German co-production
Verräter	Michael Braun	Karl Michael Vogler, Chariklia Baxevanos, Paul Albert Krumm, Hans Caninenberg, Günther Schramm, Walter Kohut, Alexander Kerst	Thriller	a.k.a. Curtain of Fear
Viele heißen Kain	Hansjörg Utzerath	Elisabeth Müller, Dieter Borsche, Günther Neutze, Friedrich Joloff, Stefan Behrens	Crime drama	
A View from the Bridge	Ludwig Cremer	Hans Christian Blech, Helmut Griem, Monika Peitsch	Drama	
Viola	Otto Tausig	Brigitte Grothum, Ernst Stankovski, Herbert Mensching	Comedy	
Die Voruntersuchung	Joachim Hess	Carl Lange, Lutz Hochstraate, Kornelia Boje, Karl-Josef Cramer	Crime drama	a.k.a. Inquest
Walther Rathenau – Untersuchung eines Attentats	Franz Peter Wirth	Christian Doermer, Lina Carstens, Paul Dahlke, Paul Verhoeven, Paul Hoffmann	Docudrama	
When Ludwig Goes on Manoeuvres	Werner Jacobs	Hansi Kraus, Elisabeth Flickenschildt, Rudolf Rhomberg, Heidelinde Weis, Georg Thomalla, Hubert von Meyerinck, Beppo Brem	Comedy	
When Night Falls on the Reeperbahn	Rolf Olsen	Fritz Wepper, Erik Schumann, Konrad Georg, Jürgen Draeger, Heinz Reincke	Crime	
The White Horse Inn	Hans Dieter Schwarze	Johanna Matz, Peter Weck, Violetta Ferrari, Erik Schumann, Helga Anders	Musical	
Wie verbringe ich meinen Sonntag?	Rainer Wolffhardt	Gerhard Acktun, Ingeborg Lapsien, Maria Singer, Hans Emons	Drama	
Wilder Reiter GmbH	Franz-Josef Spieker	Herbert Fux, Bernd Herzsprung, Rainer Basedow	Comedy	a.k.a. Wild Rider Ltd.
Wo liegt Jena?	Jürgen Goslar	Wolfgang Preiss, Alfred Schieske	Drama	
Die Zimmerwirtin	Ludwig Cremer	Maria Wimmer, Karl Michael Vogler	Comedy	a.k.a. La Logeuse
Zuchthaus	Rolf Hädrich	Vadim Glowna	Drama	a.k.a. Die bestrafte Zeit
Zug der Zeit	Peter Beauvais	Siegfried Rauch, Barbara Schöne, Uwe Friedrichsen, Helga Feddersen, Gert Haucke, Wera Frydtberg, Dirk Dautzenberg	Comedy	
Der Zündholzkönig – Der Fall Ivar Kreuger	Robert A. Stemmle	Peter van Eyck	Biography	a.k.a. The Match King

== See also ==
- List of Austrian films of 1967
- List of East German films of 1967

== Bibliography ==
- Bergfelder, Tim. International Adventures: German Popular Cinema and European Co-Productions in the 1960s. Berghahn Books, 2005.
