= Ringstraßenpalais (TV series) =

- Written by: Hellmut Andics
- Directed by: Rudolf Nussgruber
- Country of origin: Austria; West Germany
- No. of seasons: 3

Original release
- Network: ORF; ZDF
- Release: December 25, 1980

Ringstraßenpalais is an Austrian-West German television series.

== Cast ==
In alphabetical order

- Erich Auer as Minister
- Karlheinz Böhm as Bernie Artenberg
- Jean-Claude Bouillon as Claude
- Ivan Desny as Richard von Wintrop
- Vernon Dobtcheff as Major Georges Comte de Castroux
- Richard Eybner as Card player
- Erik Frey as General Bernhard Graf Artenberg
- Olga Georges-Picot as Michèle
- Karlheinz Hackl as Dr. Paul Ender jr.
- Attila Hörbiger as Pater Florian
- Michael Janisch as Kriminalbeamter
- Dagmar Koller as Anni Berte
- Ida Krottendorf as Bertha
- Gerlinde Locker as Poldi Artenberg
- Josef Meinrad as Emil Hoffeneder
- Kurt Meisel as Dr. Wirtsbacher
- Fritz Muliar as Imre Kelemen
- Paul Muller as Comte de Castroux
- Susi Nicoletti as Durchlaucht Antonie Fürstin Slansky
- Maria Perschy as Madame
- Rudolf Prack as Ferdinand
- Wolfgang Preiss as General Prettwitz
- Imre Ráday as Pista
- Lukas Resetarits as Erwin
- Sieghardt Rupp as Hermann
- Hans-Jürgen Schatz as Walter Klopf
- Heinrich Schweiger as Eduard Baumann
- Bert Sotlar as Joka Jovanovic
- Franz Stoss as General
- Jane Tilden as Sophie
- Friedrich von Thun as Bernhard Graf Artenberg
- Klausjürgen Wussow as SS Standartenführer

== See also ==
- List of Austrian television series
