= Hellmut Andics =

Austrian journalist (1922–1998)

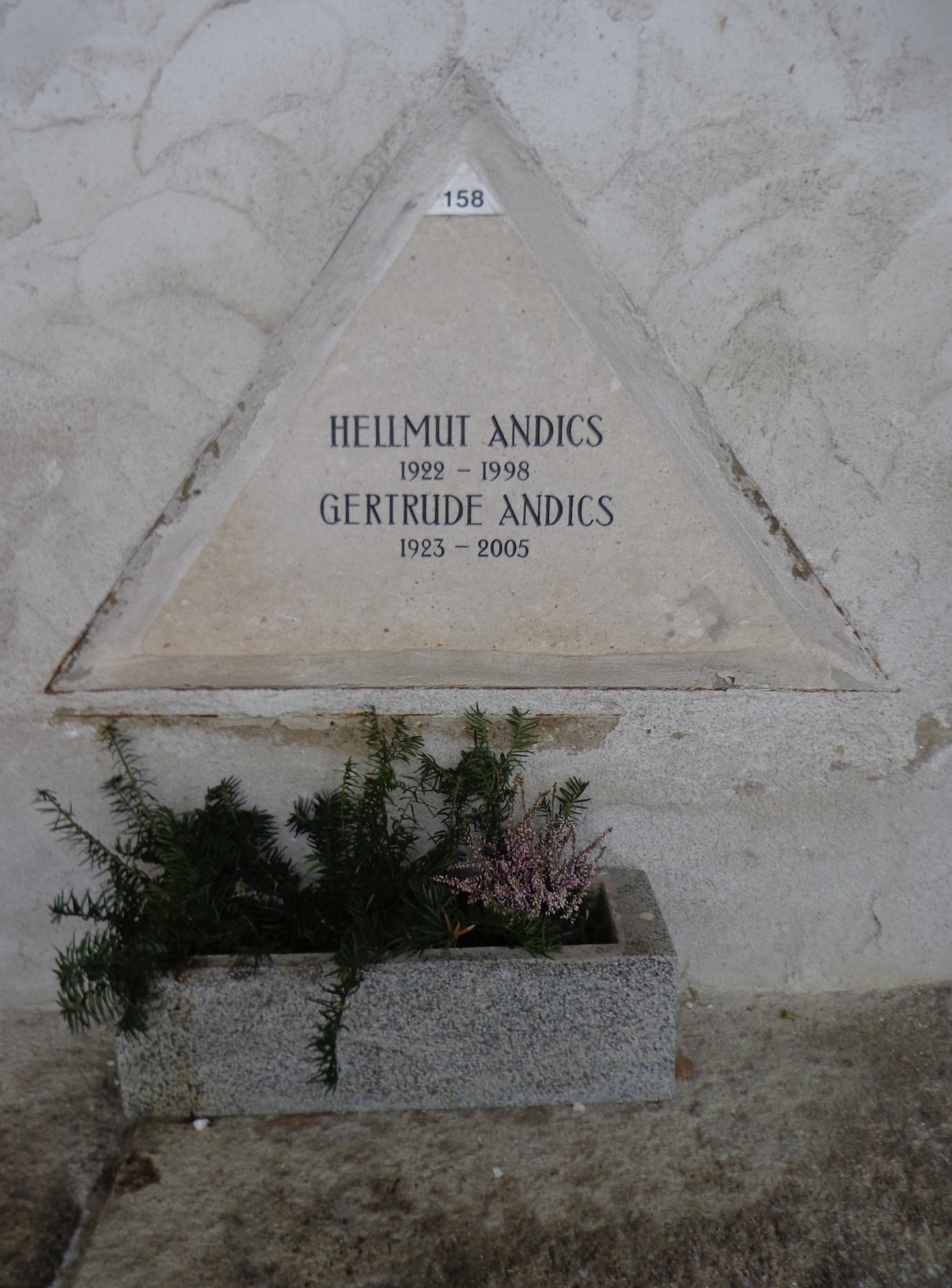
Feuerhalle Simmering, grave of Hellmut Andics

Hellmut Andics (25 August 1922 – 19 August 1998) was an Austrian journalist, publicist and writer.

== Life ==
After military service in World War II Andics became a journalist and worked as an editor, at The New Austria and Die Presse.

From 1 March 1979 to 31 December 1980 Andics was director of the Burgenland Festival. From 11 October 1982 to 27 October 1986, he was director of the ORF Regional Studio Burgenland.

He is best known for its contemporary history reports and documentaries. He also wrote the screenplay for the television series Ringstraßenpalais and for the five-part documentary television film Bürgerkrieg in Rußland, which the ZDF produced in 1967 under the direction of Wolfgang Schleif. He also had the idea for the television series Der Salzbaron by Bernd Fischerauer. Andics was the father of two sons (Eric and Maximilian) and had three grandchildren (Daniel, Therese and Sophie).

Hellmut Andics died in his apartment in Vienna in the early morning hours of August 19, 1998, of heart failure. He was cremated at Feuerhalle Simmering, where also his ashes are buried.

== Literature ==
- 1970: Dr.-Karl-Renner-journalism Price
- 1992: Cultural Prize of Burgenland

== Works ==
- 1962: The State that Nobody Wanted
- 1964: The Vices of this Time
- 1965: The Case of Otto Habsburg. A Report
- 1965: The Eternal Jew. Causes and History of Anti-Semitism. Published by Fritz Molden
- 1967: The Great Terror. From the Beginning of the Russian Revolution to the Death of Stalin
- 1968: 50 Years of Our Lives. Austria's Fate Since 1918
- 1969: The Women of the Habsburgs
- 1974: The Austrian Century. The Austro-Hungarian Empire 1804-1918
- 1976: The Sinking of the Austro-Hungarian Empire. Austria-Hungary from the Turn of the Century Until November 1918
- 1976: The Isle of the Blessed. Austria of the Moscow Declaration to the Present Convention
- 1977: Meeting on the Danube
- 1981: Founder Time. The Black and Yellow Vienna Until 1867
- 1983: Ringstrasse World. Vienna 1867-1887
- 1984: Luegerzeit. The Black Vienna Until 1918
- 1988: The Jews of Vienna

== Filmography ==
=== Film ===
- Endangered Girls (dir. Wolfgang Glück, 1958)
- Hoch klingt der Radetzkymarsch (dir. Géza von Bolváry, 1958)
- The Street (dir. Hermann Kugelstadt, 1958)
- The Priest and the Girl (dir. Gustav Ucicky, 1958)
- Girls for the Mambo-Bar (dir. Wolfgang Glück, 1959)
- Twelve Girls and One Man (dir. Hans Quest, 1959)
- Treffpunkt Salon Parisi / Frauen in Teufels Hand (dir. Hermann Leitner, 1960)
- Deutschland – deine Sternchen (dir. Edwin Zbonek, 1962)
- Wenn beide schuldig werden (dir. Hermann Leitner, 1962)
- The Red Frenzy (dir. Wolfgang Schleif, 1962)

=== Television ===
- Wolken über Kaprun (dir. Franz Josef Gottlieb, 1964, TV series)
- Das Kriminalgericht: Der Fall Nebe (dir. Georg Tressler, 1964, TV series episode)
- The Blue Danube (dir. John Olden, 1965)
- Der Fall Auer/Ranneth – Unschuldig hinter Gittern (dir. Gedeon Kovács, 1966)
- Der Fall der Generale (dir. Gedeon Kovács, 1966)
- Der rasende Reporter – Egon Erwin Kisch (dir. Robert A. Stemmle, 1967)
- Bürgerkrieg in Rußland (dir. Wolfgang Schleif, 1967–1968, TV miniseries)
- Sir Roger Casement (dir. Hermann Kugelstadt, 1968)
- The Spanish Civil War (dir. Rudolph Cartier, 1969)
- Der Baum von Kfar Etzyon (dir. Georg Tressler, 1969)
- Gnade für Timothy Evans (dir. Korbinian Köberle, 1969)
- Friedrich III – Gestorben als Kaiser (dir. Rudolf Nussgruber, 1970)
- The Death of Deputy Jean Jaurès (dir. Frank Guthke, 1970)
- The Bavarian Soviet Republic (dir. Helmut Ashley, 1971)
- Der Fall Jägerstätter (dir. Axel Corti, 1971)
- Sacro Egoismo oder Der Bruch der Achse – Der Kriegsaustritt Italiens im Jahre 1943 (dir. Rudolf Nussgruber, 1971)
- Emperor Charles' Last Battle (dir. Rudolf Nussgruber, 1971)
- The Three Faces of Tamara Bunke (dir. Helmut Ashley, 1971)
- That's Me – Vienna Fates of the '30s: Austria Between Democracy and Dictatorship (dir. Rudolf Nussgruber, 1972)
- You Will Not Die Alone – A German Military Chaplain in Paris (dir. Jürgen Goslar, 1973)
- Alfred Delp: In the Face of Death (dir. Walter Davy, 1973)
- If You Want, It Is Not a Fairy Tale (dir. Imo Moszkowicz, 1973)
- The Isle of the Blessed (dir. Walter Davy, 1976)
- Ringstraßenpalais (dir. Rudolf Nussgruber, 1980–1986, TV series)
- Roda Rodas rote Weste – Ein Leben in Anekdoten (dir. Rolf von Sydow, 1983)
- Hot Days in July (dir. Otto Anton Eder, 1984)
- Der Salzbaron (dir. Bernd Fischerauer, 1994–1995, TV miniseries)
