= Else Rambausek =

Austrian actress (1907–1994)

Else Rambausek (married name Else Rambausek-Salzer; 2 December 1907 in Purkersdorf, Austria – 14 August 1994 in Vienna, Austria) was an Austrian actress and singer.

== Career ==
She graduated from the University of Music and Performing Arts, Vienna. She appeared at various theaters with Walter Bruno Iltz and also revue theaters, particularly in Viennese operettas and musical comedies. They made their names as singers, particularly as interpreters of Viennese songs. In 1945, at the Raimund Theater, when the musical comedy Das Dreimäderlhaus was revived, the pair were among the performers.

Rambusek appeared at the Löwinger-Bühne and in 1959 at the Lake Festival Mörbisch as Princess Bocena in the operetta Countess Maritza. She also acted in theater productions such as the 1964 production of The Threepenny Opera at the Theater an der Wien as Celia Peachum. She also worked in radio.

After 1951, she took on supporting roles in movies, including musicals and comedies. In these roles she usually played silly housekeepers or stern aunts. Rambausek was married to Karl Salzer.

== Death ==
Else Rambausek is buried in the cemetery in Purkersdorf.

== Filmography ==
- 1951: Das Herz einer Frau
- 1952: Saison in Salzburg
- 1952: The Landlady of Maria Wörth
- 1952: Ich tanze mit dir in den Himmel hinein
- 1953: Die Perle von Tokay
- 1954: Das Licht der Liebe
- 1955: An der schönen blauen Donau
- 1956: Rosmarie kommt aus Wildwest
- 1956: Die Magd von Heiligenblut
- 1957: Wie schön, daß es dich gibt
- 1958: Candidates for Marriage
- 1958: Endangered Girls
- 1958: Hello Taxi
- 1958: Das Dreimäderlhaus
- 1959: Herrn Josefs letzte Liebe
- 1959: Kein Mann zum Heiraten
- 1960: My Niece Doesn't Do That
- 1960: Das Dorf ohne Moral
- 1961: Eduard III
- 1961: Season in Salzburg
- 1962: Vor Jungfrauen wird gewarnt
- 1962: Wedding Night in Paradise
- 1966: Congress of Love
- 1967: Wiener Schnitzel
- 1968: s' Wiesnhendel
- 1971: Der Prokurator oder Die Liebe der schönen Bianca
