= Nicolin Kunz =

Austrian actor (1953-1997)

Christiane-Nicolin Kunz (born 9 December 1953 in Vienna; died 31 December 1997 in Carinthia) was an Austrian actress and daughter of the Austrian opera singer Erich Kunz.

== Biography ==
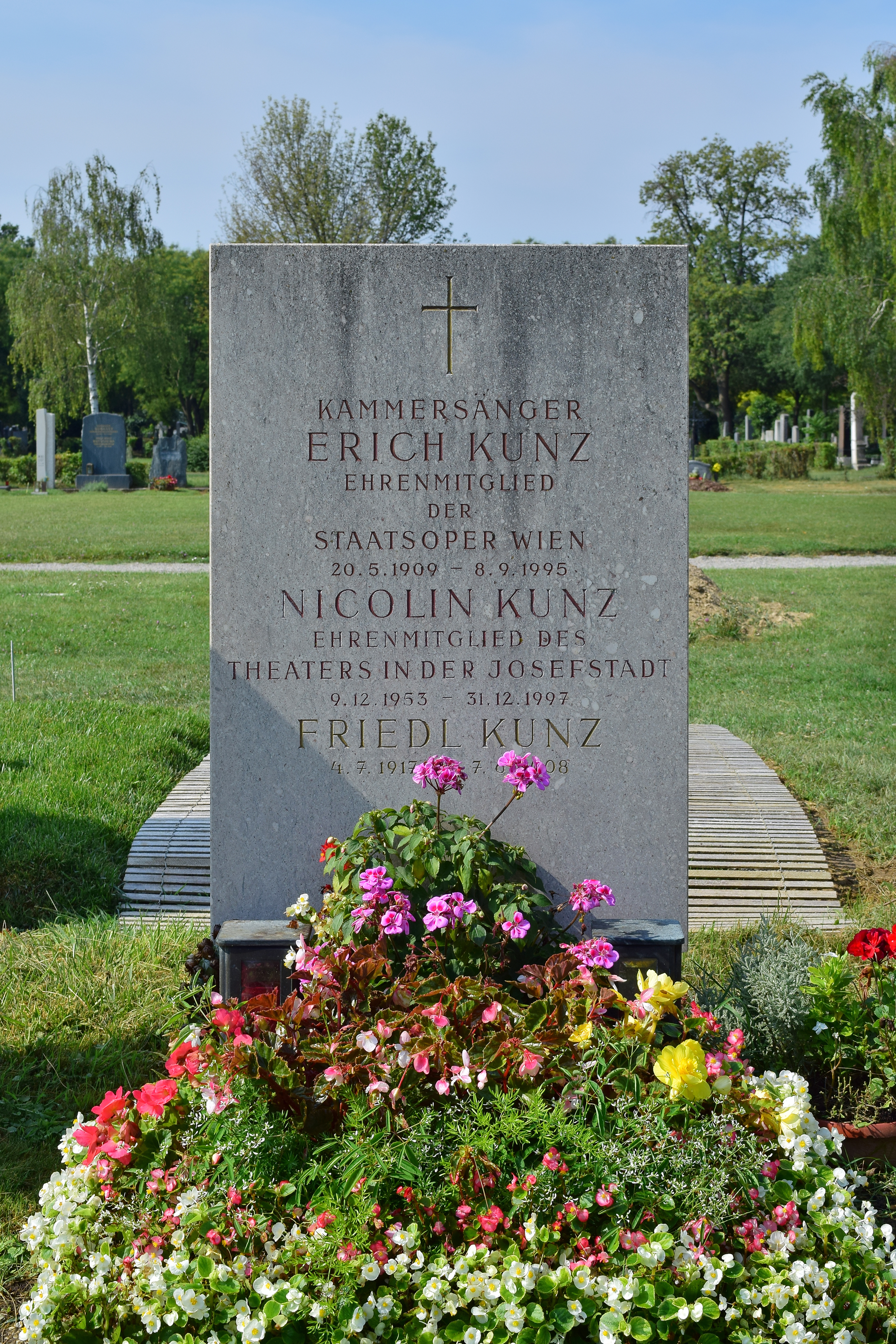
Honorary grave in the Vienna Central Cemetery

After graduating from the Lycée Français de Vienne, she completed the secretary academy. A qualified secretary, Kunz was initially employed at the Austrian foreign trade representation in Montréal in 1976. She also attended interpreting schools for French and Italian. First in 1978 she received private acting training and in the same year her first theatre engagement at the Wiener Volkstheater. From 1979, she was a member of the Ensemble at the Theater in der Josefstadt for many years.

She also appeared in various television films, including Ein Kind war Zeuge and the television series Ringstraßenpalais.

She died unexpectedly on New Year's Eve 1997 as a result of a heart attack and was buried in her father's honourably dedicated grave at the Vienna Central Cemetery (group 40, number 174).

== Filmography ==
- 1980-1993: Die liebe Familie (television series)
- 1981: Ringstraßenpalais (television series)
- 1983: Skandal in Lobodau (television film)
- 1983: Die goldenen Schuhe (television five-parter)
- 1984: Sag die Wahrheit (television film)
- 1984: Tod eines Schaustellers (television film)
- 1985: Es war nicht die Fünfte, es war die Neunte (television film)
- 1985: Tatort: Baranskis Geschäft
- 1988: Wie kommt das Salz ins Meer? (TV film)
- 1991: Der Schwierige (TV film)
- 1991: Malina
- 1991: Tatort: Telefongeld
- 1992: Vier Frauen sind einfach zuviel (TV film)
- 1993: Eine Mörderin (TV film)
- 1994: Der Gletscherclan (television series)
- 1995: Auf immer und ewig (television series)
- 1995: Tatort: Bienzle und die Feuerwand
- 1996: Sylter Geschichten: Liebe ist mehr als ein Wort (television series)
- 1996: SOKO 5113: Geruch (television series)
- 1996: Rosamunde Pilcher: Eine besondere Liebe (television series)
- 1997: Fröhlich geschieden (television film)
- 1997: Friedemann Brix – Eine Schwäche für Mord: Tödliche Aura (television series)
- 1997: Solo für Sudmann: Konfettimord (television series)
- 1997: Mein Papa ist kein Mörder / Ein Kind war Zeuge (television film)

== Literature ==
- Hermann J. Huber: Langen Müller's Schauspielerlexikon der Gegenwart. Germany. Austria. Switzerland. Albert Langen - Georg Müller Verlag GmbH, Munich - Vienna 1986, ISBN 3-7844-2058-3, p. 557 as Nicole Kunz.
- C. Bernd Sucher (ed.): Theatre Lexicon. Authors, directors, actors, dramaturges, stage designers, critics. By Christine Dössel and Marietta Piekenbrock with the assistance of Jean-Claude Kuner and C. Bernd Sucher. 2nd edition. Deutscher Taschenbuch-Verlag, Munich 1999, ISBN 3-423-03322-3, p. 409 as Nicole Kunz
