= My Friend Barbara =

1937 film

- Directed by: Fritz Kirchhoff
- Written by: Willy Kollo; Fritz Kirchhoff
- Produced by: Hermann Grund; Erich Waschneck
- Starring: Grethe Weiser; Paul Hoffmann; Ingeborg von Kusserow
- Cinematography: Georg Bruckbauer
- Edited by: Milo Harbich
- Music by: Willy Kollo
- Production company: UFA
- Distributed by: UFA
- Release date: 17 December 1937
- Running time: 80 minutes
- Country: Germany
- Language: German

My Friend Barbara (German: Meine Freundin Barbara) is a 1937 German comedy film directed by Fritz Kirchhoff and starring Grethe Weiser, Paul Hoffmann and Ingeborg von Kusserow.

The film's sets were designed by Gustav A. Knauer. Some location filming took place around Lake Constance.

== Cast ==
- Grethe Weiser as Barbara
- Paul Hoffmann as Dr. Reinerz
- Elisabeth Ried as Stefanie
- Frank Zimmermann as Frank
- Ingeborg von Kusserow as Lucie
- Ellen Bang as Ursula
- Manny Ziener as Frau Werner
- Luise Morland as Emelie
- Gudrun Ady as Klara
- Hans Leibelt as Andermann sen.
- Jakob Tiedtke as Stockinger
- Wilhelm P. Krüger as Lohmeyer
- Angelo Ferrari as Geschäftsführer
- Arthur Schröder as Hotelchef
- Günther Ballier as Oberkellner

== Bibliography ==
- Fox, Jo (2000). Filming Women in the Third Reich. Berg. ISBN 978-1-85973-391-2.
