= Walter Partsch =

Austrian cinematographer

- Born: 9 July 1923; Vienna, Austria
- Died: 26 July 2001 (aged 78); Vienna, Austria
- Occupation: Cinematographer
- Years active: 1950-1971 (film & TV)

Walter Partsch (1923–2001) was an Austrian cinematographer.

== Selected filmography ==
- The House on the Coast (1954)
- Don't Worry About Your Mother-in-Law (1954)
- Father's Day (1955)
- The Doctor's Secret (1955)
- The Poacher of the Silver Wood (1957)
- Candidates for Marriage (1958)
- The Street (1958)
- Sebastian Kneipp (1958)
- Endangered Girls (1958)
- My Daughter Patricia (1959)
- I'm Marrying the Director (1960)
- The Red Frenzy (1962)
- Mario (1963, TV series)

== Bibliography ==
- Fritsche, Maria. Homemade Men In Postwar Austrian Cinema: Nationhood, Genre and Masculinity . Berghahn Books, 2013.
- Von Dassanowsky, Robert . Austrian Cinema: A History. McFarland, 2005.
