= Felix Smetana =

German art director

- Born: 26 September 1907; Dresden, German Empire
- Died: 23 December 1968 (aged 61); Vienna, Austria
- Occupation: Art director
- Years active: 1951-1970 (film)

Felix Smetana (1907 – 1968) was a German art director. He designed the sets for many Austrian and German films during the postwar era.

== Selected filmography ==
- Wedding in the Hay (1951)
- Hello Porter (1952)
- Ideal Woman Sought (1952)
- Voices of Spring (1952)
- The Immortal Vagabond (1953)
- Lavender (1953)
- The Bird Seller (1953)
- The Sun of St. Moritz (1954)
- Espionage (1955)
- And Who Is Kissing Me? (1956)
- The Beggar Student (1956)
- Scandal in Bad Ischl (1957)
- Almenrausch and Edelweiss (1957)
- The Street (1958)
- Girls for the Mambo-Bar (1959)
- Beloved Augustin (1960)
- Our Crazy Aunts (1961)

== Bibliography ==
- Fritsche, Maria. Homemade Men in Postwar Austrian Cinema: Nationhood, Genre and Masculinity. Berghahn Books, 2013.
