= Sebastian Kneipp (film) =

1958 film

- Directed by: Wolfgang Liebeneiner
- Written by: Erna Fentsch
- Produced by: Alfred Lehr; Ernest Müller; Robert Siepen
- Starring: Carl Wery; Paul Hörbiger; Gerlinde Locker
- Cinematography: Walter Partsch
- Edited by: Heinz Haber
- Music by: Heinz Sandauer
- Production companies: Schönbrunn-Film; Österreichische Film
- Distributed by: Sascha Film; Neue Filmverleih
- Release date: 27 November 1958
- Running time: 117 minutes
- Country: Austria
- Language: German

Sebastian Kneipp is a 1958 Austrian historical film directed by Wolfgang Liebeneiner and starring Carl Wery, Paul Hörbiger, and Gerlinde Locker. It is also sometimes known as Wasserdoktor.

It was made partly at the Salzburg Studios and shot in Agfacolor. The film's sets were designed by the art director Wolf Witzemann. Location shooting took place in the spa town Bad Wörishofen in Bavaria.

== Synopsis ==
The film is a biopic of the Bavarian Sebastian Kneipp, one of the pioneers of naturopathic medicine.

== Cast ==
- Carl Wery as Sebastian Kneipp
- Paul Hörbiger as Archduke Joseph
- Gerlinde Locker as Aglaya
- Michael Cramer as Hans von Faber
- Ellinor Jensen as Sebastiana
- Anita Gutwell as Anna
- Ernst Deutsch as Pope Leo XIII
- Hans Thimig as The Cardinal
- Egon von Jordan as Fr. Hoferer
- Heinz Moog as Prof. v. Ziemssen
- Horst Beck as Dr. Schmidt
- Willi Hufnagel as Semmelbauer
- Peter Lühr as Bischof Pankratius
- Felix Czerny as Kammerdiener Ledl
- Paul Klinger as Dr. Baumgarten
- Alfred Cerny as Heini
- Otto Bolesch as Herr Beda
- Norbert Scharnagel as Amtsrichter
- Vera Complojer as Patient of Kneipp
- Willy Schäfer as Vittorio

== Bibliography ==
- Bock, Hans-Michael & Bergfelder, Tim. The Concise CineGraph. Encyclopedia of German Cinema. Berghahn Books, 2009. ISBN 978-0-85745-565-9.
- Strasser, Christian. The Sound of Klein-Hollywood: Filmproduktion in Salzburg, Salzburg im Film : mit einem Filmlexikon. Österreichischer Kunst- und Kulturverlag, 1993.
