= Wolfgang Jansen =

German actor

Wolfgang Jansen (1938–1988) was a German actor.

== Selected filmography ==
- The Sinful Border (1951)
- The Chaste Libertine (1952)
- Fight of the Tertia (1952)
- Turtledove General Delivery (1952)
- Hit Parade (1953)
- The Cousin from Nowhere (1953)
- Dutch Girl (1953)
- Love, Summer and Music (1956)
- Her Corporal (1956)
- Love (1956)
- Dort in der Wachau (1957)
- Candidates for Marriage (1958)
- The Street (1958)
- The Poacher of the Silver Wood (1957)
- I'm Marrying the Director (1960)
- The Model Boy (1963)
- Our Crazy Aunts in the South Seas (1964)
- The Heathens of Kummerow (1967)
- The Secret of Santa Vittoria (1969)
