= Endangered Girls (1958 film) =

1958 film

- Directed by: Wolfgang Glück
- Written by: Hellmut Andics
- Produced by: Ernst Müller
- Starring: Gerlinde Locker; Wolf Albach-Retty; Heinz Drache
- Cinematography: Walter Partsch
- Music by: Hans Hagen
- Production company: Rex-Film
- Distributed by: Union-Film
- Release date: 6 March 1958
- Running time: 95 minutes
- Country: West Germany
- Language: German

Endangered Girls (German: Gefährdete Mädchen) is a 1958 German crime film directed by Wolfgang Glück and starring Gerlinde Locker, Wolf Albach-Retty and Heinz Drache. The film was released in the UK in 1959 as Dolls of Vice and in Italy in 1958 under the title Diecimila Donne Alla Deriva.

Location shooting took place in Hamburg and Vienna.

== Cast ==
- Wolf Albach-Retty as Dr. Thomas Jensen
- Gerlinde Locker as Erika
- Sigrid Marquardt as Christa Ritter
- Heinz Drache as Heinz Sanders
- Edith Elmay as Sonja
- Emmerich Schrenk as Mario Cortez
- Marina Petrova as Draga
- Horst Beck as Meidecke
- Raoul Retzer as Schiffskapitän
- Robert Meyn as Maulbeck, Kriminalkommissar
- Fatty George as Himself, and his Jazz Band
- Else Rambausek as janitor in Vienna
- Gert Türmer as Kraus, Conferencier

== Censorship ==
When Gefährdete Mädchen was first released in Italy in 1958, the Committee for the Theatrical Review of the Italian Ministry of Cultural Heritage and Activities rated the film suitable for people 16 years and older as long as the following frames were removed: the two dancers Alma and Annelore topless and Draga, topless, taking photographs of Sanders. The reason for the age restriction, cited in the official documents, was because of the corrupted and immoral environment in which the sequence takes place. The official document number is: 30750, it was signed on 10 December 1959 by Minister Domenico Magrì.

== Bibliography ==
- Thomas Elsaesser & Michael Wedel. The BFI companion to German cinema. British Film Institute, 1999.
