= Candidates for Marriage =

1958 film directed by Hermann Kugelstadt

- Directed by: Hermann Kugelstadt
- Written by: August Rieger; Hugo Wiener
- Produced by: Ernest Müller; Robert Siepen
- Starring: Beppo Brem; Paul Hörbiger; Gerlinde Locker
- Cinematography: Walter Partsch
- Edited by: Luise Dreyer-Sachsenberg
- Music by: Hans Lang
- Production companies: Rex-Film; Schönbrunn-Film
- Distributed by: Kopp-Filmverleih
- Release date: 17 January 1958
- Running time: 95 minutes
- Countries: Austria; West Germany
- Language: German

Candidates for Marriage (German: Heiratskandidaten) is a 1958 Austrian-West German comedy film directed by Hermann Kugelstadt and starring Beppo Brem, Paul Hörbiger and Gerlinde Locker. It was shot at the Schönbrunn Studios in Vienna and on location around the city. The film's sets were designed by the art director Wolf Witzemann.

== Cast ==
- Beppo Brem as Valentin Obermeier
- Paul Hörbiger as Ferdinand Haslinger
- Gerlinde Locker as Monika Urban
- Rudolf Carl as Dippelmoser
- Lucie Englisch as Regerl Obermeier
- Walter Korth as Hans Obermeier
- Lizzi Holzschuh as Mathilde Urban
- Fritz Muliar as Ein Wachmann
- Ethel Reschke as Hilde Haslinger
- Wolfgang Jansen as Wolfgang
- Cissy Kraner as Marlene, Barsängerin
- Erwin v. Gross as Bob, Jazzsänger
- Hilde Rom as Frau Maria, eine Heiratslustige
- Herta Konrad as Frau Klara, eine Heiratslustige
- Brigitte Antonius as Frau Grete, eine Heiratslustige
- Hertha Kratz as Frau Bürgermeisterin
- Ruth Winter as Valli, ihre Tochter
- Walter Varndal as Herr Prebichl
- Hugo Gottschlich as Herr Brunbirl
- Else Rambausek as Frau Powondra
- Felix Czerny as Authaller
- Heinrich Fuchs as Der Vorstand
- Peter Gerhard as Richter
- Fritz Heller as Chef des Praterrestaurants

== Bibliography ==
- Bock, Hans-Michael & Bergfelder, Tim. The Concise CineGraph. Encyclopedia of German Cinema. Berghahn Books, 2009.
