= Edith Elmay =

Austrian actress (1936–2022)

- Born: 24 July 1936; Vienna, Austria
- Died: 7 August 2020 (aged 84)
- Occupation: Actress
- Years active: 1957–1966 (film and television)

Edith Elmay (24 July 1936 – 7 August 2020) was an Austrian film and television actress.

Elmay died on 7 August 2020, at the age of 84.

== Selected filmography ==
- Scandal in Bad Ischl (1957)
- The Street (1958)
- My Ninety Nine Brides (1958)
- Endangered Girls (1958)
- Girls for the Mambo-Bar (1959)
- Rendezvous in Vienna (1959)
- My Daughter Patricia (1959)
- The Good Soldier Schweik (1960)
- Mariandl (1961)
- Always Trouble with the Bed (1961)

== Bibliography ==
- Popa, Dorin. O.W. Fischer: seine Filme, sein Leben. Wilhelm Heyne, 1989.
