= My Daughter Patricia =

- Directed by: Wolfgang Liebeneiner
- Written by: Hans Fritz Köllner
- Produced by: Alfred Lehr; Ernest Müller
- Starring: Martin Held; Gerhard Riedmann; Gerlinde Locker
- Cinematography: Walter Partsch
- Edited by: Ursula Norkus
- Music by: Heinz Neubrand
- Production company: ÖFA-Schönbrunn Film
- Distributed by: Neue Filmverleih
- Release date: 22 May 1959
- Running time: 107 minutes
- Country: Austria
- Language: German

My Daughter Patricia (German: Meine Tochter Patricia) is a 1959 Austrian comedy film directed by Wolfgang Liebeneiner and starring Martin Held, Gerhard Riedmann and Gerlinde Locker.

The film's sets were designed by the art director Wolf Witzemann. It was shot at the Rosenhügel Studios in Vienna.

== Synopsis ==
A pharmacist finds his life disrupted when he discovers that he has an eighteen-year-old daughter living in Switzerland.

== Cast ==
- Martin Held as Heinz Roland, Apotheker
- Gerhard Riedmann as Der Lüthi, Provisor
- Gerlinde Locker as Patricia Roland
- Chariklia Baxevanos as Denise Bermont
- Marianne Schönauer as Celia Bermont
- Edith Elmay as Trudchen Pälmann
- Hans Thimig as Dr. Hartung
- Horst Beck as Redakteur Bluhme

== Bibliography ==
- Bock, Hans-Michael & Bergfelder, Tim. The Concise CineGraph. Encyclopedia of German Cinema. Berghahn Books, 2009.
