= Girls for the Mambo-Bar =

1959 film

- Directed by: Wolfgang Glück
- Written by: Hellmut Andics; August Rieger
- Starring: Kai Fischer; Gerlinde Locker; Jimmy Makulis
- Cinematography: Walter Tuch
- Edited by: Ursula Norkus
- Music by: Gilbert Bécaud; Sten Clift; Klaus Ogermann; Dámaso Pérez Prado
- Production company: Rex Film
- Distributed by: Neue Filmverleih
- Release date: 23 July 1959
- Running time: 85 minutes
- Country: West Germany
- Language: German

Girls for the Mambo-Bar (German: Mädchen für die Mambo-Bar) is a 1959 West German crime film directed by Wolfgang Glück and starring Kai Fischer, Gerlinde Locker and Jimmy Makulis. The film's sets were designed by the art directors Felix Smetana.

== Synopsis ==
Eva, an aspiring singer, gets work at the Mambo-Bar which fronts for a number of crimes. She encounters a trumpeter, unaware that he is really an undercover detective.

== Cast ==
- Kai Fischer as Olga
- Gerlinde Locker as Eva
- Jimmy Makulis as Jimmy
- Rolf Kutschera as Martini
- Edith Elmay
- Wolf Albach-Retty as Krüger
- Rolf Olsen as Rutka
- Horst Beck
- Guido Wieland
- Raoul Retzer
- Inge Rassaerts
- Renate Rohm
- Aina Capell
- Josef Hendrichs
- Hansi Prinz
- Mona Baptiste
- Macky Kaspar
- Gaby King
- Dalida
- Alfred Böhm
- Fatty George
- Habiba
- Sieghardt Rupp as Tommy Kersten

== Bibliography ==
- Joachim Lembach. The standing of the German cinema in Great Britain after 1945. Edwin Mellen Press, 2003.
