= The Street (1958 film) =

1958 film directed by Hermann Kugelstadt

- Directed by: Hermann Kugelstadt
- Written by: Hellmut Andics
- Produced by: Ernest Müller; Robert Siepen
- Starring: Martha Wallner; Heinz Drache; Marina Petrova
- Cinematography: Walter Partsch
- Edited by: Anneliese Artelt
- Music by: Karl Götz
- Production company: Rex-Film
- Distributed by: Union-Film
- Release date: 26 September 1958
- Running time: 96 minutes
- Country: West Germany
- Language: German

The Street (German: Die Straße) is a 1958 West German crime drama film directed by Hermann Kugelstadt and starring Martha Wallner, Heinz Drache and Marina Petrova.

The film's sets were designed by the art director Felix Smetana. It was shot at studios in Vienna.

== Synopsis ==
An engineer returns from Africa to discover that his former girlfriend has fallen under the control of a drug dealer and pimp.

== Cast ==
- Martha Wallner as Andrea
- Heinz Drache as Bob Schneider
- Marina Petrova as Marie
- Rolf Kutschera as Korbanke
- Edith Elmay as Karin
- Horst Beck as Paulsen
- Wolfgang Jansen as Max
- Raoul Retzer
- Guido Wieland as Manulescu
- Thomas Hörbiger
- Brigitte Antonius as Erna

== Bibliography ==
- Bertil Wredlund & Rolf Lindfors. Långfilm i Sverige: 1950–1959. Proprius, 1979.
