= Rudolf Nussgruber =

Austrian film director (1918–2001)

- Born: 7 April 1918; Vienna, Austria-Hungary (now Austria)
- Died: 26 July 2001 (aged 83); Vienna, Austria
- Occupation: Film director
- Years active: 1947-1985

Rudolf Nussgruber (7 April 1918 – 26 July 2001) was an Austrian film director. In 1962, he co-directed the documentary film Flying Clipper with Hermann Leitner and it was entered into the 3rd Moscow International Film Festival. He directed more than 30 films between 1955 and 1985.

== Selected filmography ==
- Flying Clipper (1962)
- Carl Schurz (1968, TV film)
- Die Kuba-Krise 1962 (1969, TV film)
- Friedrich III – Gestorben als Kaiser (1970, TV film)
- Claus Graf Stauffenberg (1970, TV film)
- General Oster – Verräter oder Patriot? (1970, TV film)
- Die U-2-Affäre (1970, TV film)
- Sacro Egoismo oder Der Bruch der Achse – Der Kriegsaustritt Italiens im Jahre 1943 (1971, TV film)
- Kaiser Karls letzte Schlacht (1971, TV film)
- Das bin ich – Wiener Schicksale aus den 30er Jahren: Österreich zwischen Demokratie und Diktatur (1972, TV film)
- Die Pueblo-Affäre (1972, TV film)
- Max Hoelz (1972, TV film)
- Der Schuft, der den Münchhausen schrieb (1979, TV film)
- Ringstraßenpalais (1980–1986, TV series)
- August der Starke (1984, TV film)
- Ein Mann namens Parvus (1984, TV film)
