= Who Killed Johnny R.? =

1966 film

- Directed by: José Luis Madrid
- Written by: Ladislas Fodor; Paul Jarrico; José Luis Madrid
- Produced by: Artur Brauner; Götz Dieter Wulf
- Starring: Lex Barker; Joachim Fuchsberger; Marianne Koch
- Cinematography: Julio Pérez de Rozas
- Edited by: Walter Wischniewsky
- Music by: Federico Martínez Tudó
- Production companies: CCC Film; Tilma Films
- Distributed by: Nora Film
- Release date: 19 May 1966
- Running time: 91 minutes
- Countries: Spain; West Germany
- Language: German

Who Killed Johnny R.? (German: Wer kennt Johnny R.?) is a 1966 Spanish-West German western film directed by José Luis Madrid and starring Lex Barker, Joachim Fuchsberger and Marianne Koch. It was shot at the Spandau Studios in West Berlin and on location around Barcelona. The film's sets were designed by the art director Andrés Vallvé.

== Synopsis ==
The outlaw Johnny Ringo has escaped and is presumed dead by many. However Captain Conroy suspects he in fact laying low under an alias, and mistakenly believes that Clyde Smith is the notorious killer and seeks revenge on him.

== Cast ==
- Lex Barker as Sam Dobie/Johnny Ringo
- Joachim Fuchsberger as Clyde Smith
- Marianne Koch as Bea Bordet
- Ralf Wolter as Billy Monroe
- Barbara Bold as Cathy Carmichael
- Sieghardt Rupp as Captain Jason Conroy
- César Ojinaga as Thorpe
- Isidro Novellas as Tombstone Sheriff
- Montserrat Porta as Cathy Conroy
- Carlos Otero as Mason
- Vicente Soler as Kowalski

== Bibliography ==
- Lentz, Harris M. Feature Films, 1960–1969: A Filmography of English-Language and Major Foreign-Language United States Releases. McFarland, 2009.
- Weisser, Thomas. Spaghetti Westerns: The Good, the Bad and the Violent. McFarland, 2005.
