= Löwinger-Bühne =

Löwinger-Bühne is a theatre in Austria.
