= Chariklia Baxevanos =

Swiss actress

- Born: 15 March 1936 (age 90); Zürich, Switzerland
- Occupation: Actress
- Years active: 1952-present

Chariklia Baxevanos (born 15 March 1936) is a Swiss actress. She appeared in more than sixty films since 1952.

== Selected filmography ==
Year	Title	Role	Notes
1952	Shame on You, Brigitte!	Hertha Engelberger	
1953	Franz Schubert	Young girl	
1957	A Piece of Heaven	Das Mädchen Elfriede	
1957	The Unexcused Hour	Elfriede Dolleschal	
1957	Sissi – Fateful Years of an Empress	Helena	
1958	Abschied von den Wolken	Stella Valencias	
1959	What a Woman Dreams of in Springtime	Helga	
1959	My Daughter Patricia	Denise Bermont	
1964	The Monster of London City	Betty Ball	
1982	Unterwegs nach Atlantis	Mark's Mother	TV series
