= Edith Heerdegen =

German actress (1913–1982)

- Born: 2 July 1913; Dresden, German Empire
- Died: 13 July 1982 (aged 69); Dachsberg, West Germany
- Occupation: Actress
- Years active: 1949–1982

Edith Heerdegen (2 July 1913 – 13 July 1982) was a German actress. She appeared in more than 50 films and television shows between 1949 and 1982.

== Filmography ==
Year	Title	Role	Notes
1949	Second Hand Destiny	Hermine Bruns	
1957	Love from Paris		
1970	Christmas Not Just Once a Year	Aunt Milla	TV film
1972	The Stuff That Dreams Are Made Of	Luise Gottschalk	
1976	Everyone Dies Alone	Sarah Rosenthal	
1977	The Serpent's Egg	Mrs. Holle	
1978	Die Mutter		
1981	The Second Skin	Grandmother	TV film
1982	Who's Crazy, Doc?	Käthe	
