= Hans Caninenberg =

German actor (1913–2008)

- Born: 15 January 1913; Duisburg, German Empire
- Died: 29 June 2008 (aged 95); Gräfelfing, Bavaria, West Germany
- Occupation: Actor
- Years active: 1952-1997 (film & TV)

Hans Caninenberg (15 January 1913 – 29 June 2008) was a German actor. He was married to the actress Lola Müthel.

== Filmography ==
| Year | Title | Role | Notes |
|---|---|---|---|
| 1952 | Oh, You Dear Fridolin | Edgar | |
| 1955 | Doctor Solm | Peter Lauritz | |
| 1955 | Hotel Adlon | Direktor Jansen | |
| 1960 | Hamlet | Claudius | TV movie |
| 1964 | A Man in His Prime | Alfred von Xanten | |
| 1966 | Liselotte of the Palatinate | Louis XIV | |
| 1971 | Der Kommissar: Grau-roter Morgen | Herr Larasser | TV series episode |
| 1973 | Giordano Bruno | | |
| 1974 | The Odessa File | Dr. Ferdinand Schultz | |
| 1978 | Lady Audley's Secret | Sir Michael Audley | TV movie |
| 1982 | High Society Limited | Petersen | |

== Bibliography ==
- Goble, Alan. The Complete Index to Literary Sources in Film. Walter de Gruyter, 1999.
