= Günter Mack =

German actor

- Born: 12 December 1930; Augsburg, Germany
- Died: 27 March 2007 (aged 76); Gröbenzell, Germany
- Occupation: Actor
- Years active: 1963–2007

Günter Mack (12 December 1930 – 27 March 2007) was a German actor. He appeared in more than ninety films from 1963 to 2007. Günter Mack died of cancer at the age of 76. Already in 1996 his wife Wiltrud, mother of his daughter Susanne, had died. Next to her, he was buried in the municipal cemetery of Gröbenzell (section 41). After divorcing fellow actress Ulrike Luderer, he lived with Renate von Hagemeister until his death.

== Selected filmography ==
Year	Title	Role	Notes
1963	The Lightship	Zumpe	
1965	Marat/Sade	Marat	TV film
1966	Yesterday Girl	Ministerialrat Pichota	
1967	Sieben Wochen auf dem Eis	Umberto Nobile	TV film
1968	Death and Diamonds		
1969	Kaddish for the Living	Peri	TV film
1970	Like a Tear in the Ocean	Dr. Faber	TV miniseries
1972	Max Hoelz	Max Hoelz	TV film
1974	Auch ich war nur ein mittelmäßiger Schüler	Dr. Krummbach	
1974	Only the Wind Knows the Answer	Lothar Kessler	
1978	Job	Mendel Singer	TV miniseries
1980	Land, das meine Sprache spricht	Bukowsky	TV film
1991	Success	Förtsch	
1991	Saint Peter's Snow	Malchin	TV film
1994–1999	Alle meine Töchter	Berthold Sanwaldt	TV series, 77 episodes
