= Heinz Drache =

German actor (1923–2002)

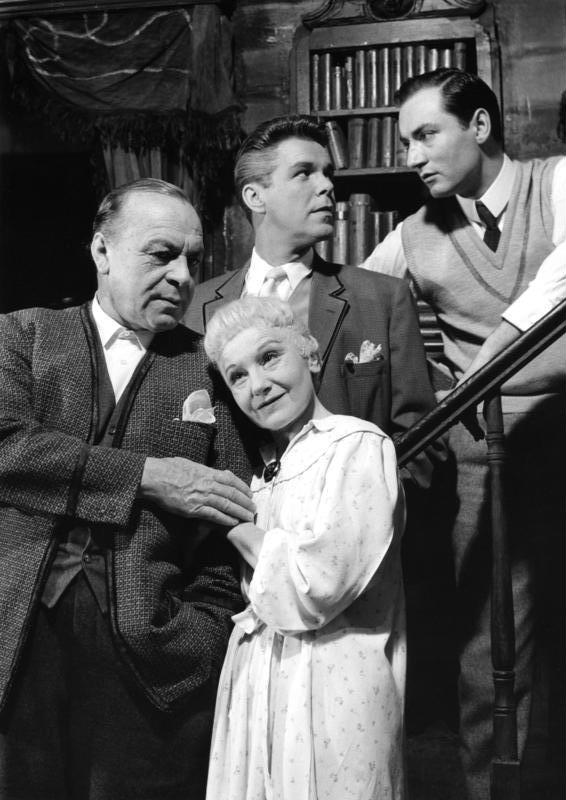
- Heinz Drache (middle back), 1957
- Born: 9 February 1923; Essen, Germany
- Died: 3 April 2002 (aged 79); Berlin, Germany
- Occupation: Actor
- Years active: 1953–2002

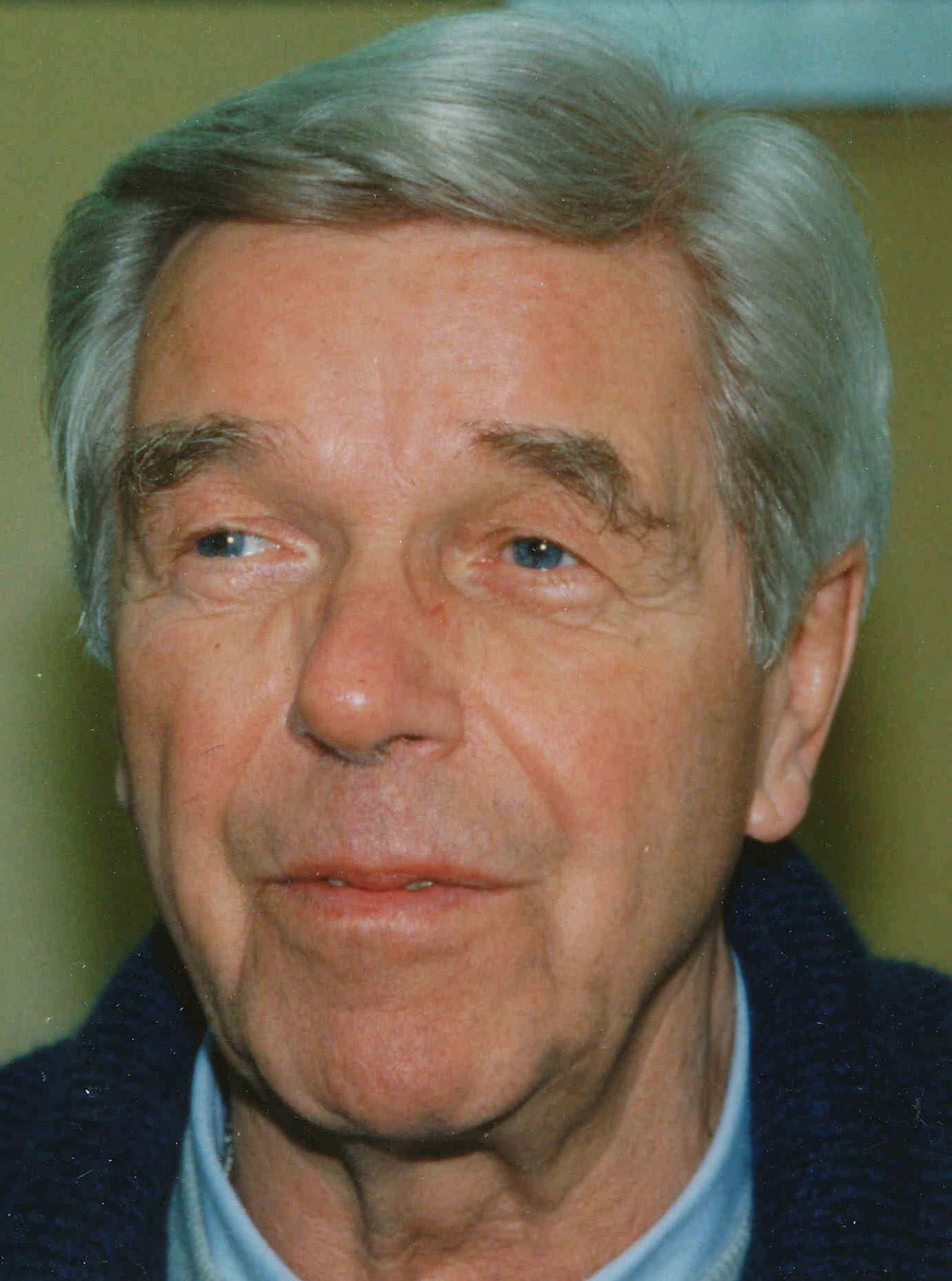
Heinz Drache

Heinz Drache (German: [haɪnts ˈdʁaxə]; 9 February 1923 – 3 April 2002) was a German film actor. He appeared in more than 40 films between 1953 and 2002. He was born in Essen, Germany and died in Berlin, Germany of lung cancer.

== Selected filmography ==
- Once I Will Return (1953) – Bob Emerson
- It Was Always So Nice With You (1954) – Komponist Peter Martens
- Spy for Germany (1956) – Jim Newman
- Kein Auskommen mit dem Einkommen! (1957) – Klaus Jäger
- Endangered Girls (1958) – Heinz Sanders
- Madeleine Tel. 13 62 11 (1958) – Wolf Siebert - Young Patron
- The Street (1958) – Bob Schneider
- The Rest Is Silence (1959) – Herbert von Pohl
- The Woman by the Dark Window (1960) – Andreas Wegner
- Mit 17 weint man nicht (1960) – Kurt
- The Avenger (1960) – Michael Brixan
- Town Without Pity (1961) – Maj. Steve Garrett (voice, uncredited)
- Das Halstuch (1962) (TV miniseries) – Kriminalinspektor Yates
- The Door with Seven Locks (1962) – Inspektor Richard "Dick" Martin
- Hypnosis (1962) – Inspector Kaufmann
- The Black Panther of Ratana (1963) – Richard Paddberg
- The Squeaker (1963) – Inspector Bill Elford
- The Indian Scarf (1963) – Frank Tanner
- The Inn on Dartmoor (1964) – Anthony Nash
- Coffin from Hong Kong (1964) – Nelson Ryan
- Der Hexer (1964) – James W. Wesby
- Coast of Skeletons (1965) – Janny Von Koltze
- Sandy the Seal (1965 released in 1969) – Jan Van Heerden
- Shots in Threequarter Time (1965) – Pierre Gilbert
- Neues vom Hexer (1965) – Inspector James W. Wesby
- Witness Out of Hell (1966) – Hoffmann
- Circus of Fear (1966) – Carl
- The Brides of Fu Manchu (1966) – Franz Baumer
- Casse-tête chinois pour le judoka (1967)
- The Hound of Blackwood Castle (1968) – Humphrey Connery
- Derrick – Season 6, Episode 10: "Das dritte Opfer" (1979) – Martin Dorp
