= Barbara Schöne =

German actress (born 1947)

- Born: 19 May 1947 (age 79); Berlin, Germany
- Occupation: Actress
- Years active: 1957-

Barbara Schöne (German: [ˈbaʁbaʁa ˈʃøːnə]; born 19 May 1947) is a German actress. She has more than a hundred credited appearances. Although she is primarily a television actress, she has also appeared in several films including the sports comedy Willi Manages the Whole Thing (1972)

She is the daughter of the art director Werner Schöne.

== Selected filmography ==
- Willi Manages the Whole Thing (1972)
- Baltic Storm (2003)
- Too Hard to Handle (2016)

== Bibliography ==
- Goble, Alan. The Complete Index to Literary Sources in Film. Walter de Gruyter, 1999.
