= Susanne Beck (actress) =

German actress and voice artist

- Born: August 23, 1947 (age 78); Hamburg, Germany
- Occupations: Actress, voice actress, radio play narrator
- Years active: 1966–2004
- Spouse: PR manager (m. 1990)
- Parent: Horst Beck

Susanne Beck (born 23 August 1947) is a former German actress, radio play narrator and voice actress. She is known for her work in German television series such as Tatort, Derrick and the children's programme Plumpaquatsch.

== Early life ==
Beck was born on 23 August 1947 in Hamburg, Germany. She is the daughter of actor Horst Beck. She trained at drama school and began her stage career at the Ernst Deutsch Theater in Hamburg, appearing in productions of Thornton Wilder's Our Town and Frederick Knott's Wait Until Dark. She also performed at theaters in Munich, including the Komödie im Marquardt.

== Career ==
Beck made her film debut in 1966 in Two Like Us. Throughout the 1970s and 1980s, she appeared in numerous German TV series, including guest roles in Tatort, Derrick, Der Alte, Notarztwagen 7 and Das Traumschiff.

She gained particular recognition as the patient co-host of the NDR children's television series Plumpaquatsch (1972–1975), appearing alongside a water-sprite hand puppet. The show produced 75 episodes during its original run, with 12 repeats broadcast in 1978.

In addition to screen work, Beck has been active as a radio play narrator and voice actress. Her last television role was a guest appearance in the series Küstenwache in 2004.

== Personal life ==
Since 1990, Beck has been married to a public relations manager for a major Japanese company and has appeared only rarely on screen since then.

== Selected filmography ==
Year	Title	Role	Notes
1966	Two Like Us	Trixi	Film debut
1967	Tragedy in a Temporary Town	Dotty Fisher	TV film
1969	The Trial Begins	Katja	TV film
1971	Sparks in Neu-Grönland	Gerda Asfari	TV film
1971	Besuch der Tochter	Dagmar	TV film
1972	Jörn Drescher, 19 Jahre		TV film
1972–1975	Plumpaquatsch	Co-host	Children's series, 75 episodes
1973	Gabriel	Ulla	TV film
1973	Polizeistation	Nancke Frenssen	8 episodes
1974	Three Men in the Snow	Susanne Tobler	Film
1974	Der Herr Kottnik	Edith Kottnik	10 episodes
1976	Tatort: Zwei Leben	Claudia	TV series episode
1976	Aus nichtigem Anlaß	Karin Wältzing	TV film
1977–1982	Derrick	Various	3 episodes
1978	Tatort: Rechnung mit einer Unbekannten	Karin Distler	TV series episode
1978	Ein Hut von ganz spezieller Art	Colombine	TV film
1980	Der Alte: Sportpalastwalzer	Petra Seiffert	TV series episode
1983	Das Traumschiff	Babsi Horn	Guest role
1987	Sturmflut	Susanne Labmann	TV film
1988	The Black Forest Clinic	Elfi	1 episode
1989	Europa, abends	Cate Hardayle	
2004	Küstenwache		Final role

== Radio plays ==
- 1980: Alfred Bester: After Zero – Director: Andreas Weber-Schäfer
