= Luitgard Im =

German actress (1930–1997)

- Born: 12 January 1930; Wemding, Germany
- Died: 21 February 1997 (aged 67); Wemding, Germany
- Occupation: Actress
- Years active: 1952–1994

Luitgard Im (12 January 1930 – 21 February 1997) was a German theater and film actress. She was active in many movies and TV-production for almost 50 years.

== Biography ==
Luitgard Im was born in Wemding, Germany.

Luitgard Im debuted on film in the German movie Alle kann ich nicht heiraten in 1952. The following years she had the lead role in many TV-movies like Die Stunde der Antigone, Phädra, and Fräulein Julie. She won particular fame as Electra and as Judith in the eponymous plays by Jean Giraudoux and as Cleopatra in George Bernard Shaw's Caesar and Cleopatra. She received considerable success in the movie At the Height of the Moon in 1969. In 1965, she received the Golden Camera award. Im had several roles in popular TV-series like Der Kommissar, Der Alte and Derrick, where she appeared in two episodes (in 1975 and 1981). Her final role was in the German TV-series Air Albatros in 1994.

Im died aged 67 in her birth town Wemding in 1997.

A book under the title Arm, aber reich... was published posthumously with experienced and told anecdotes of Luitgard Im.

== Filmography ==
=== Film ===
- 1952: I Can't Marry Them All - Emmi
- 1955: Urlaub auf Ehrenwort - Dagmar Köhler
- 1966: Spätere Heirat erwünscht - Nina
- 1969: When Sweet Moonlight Is Sleeping in the Hills - May
- 1979: Weichselkirschen - Anna

=== Television ===
- 1954: Die Generalprobe (TV Movie) - Julie
- 1960: Die Stunde der Antigone (TV Movie) - Antigone
- 1963: Beatrice und Juan (TV Movie) - Julia
- 1964: Elektra (TV Movie) - Elektra
- 1975-1981: Derrick - Frau Dederich / Kamilla Kessler
- 1994: Air Albatros - (final appearance)
