= Elfriede Kuzmany =

Austrian actress

- Born: 29 September 1915; Rokitnitz, Bohemia, Austro-Hungarian Empire
- Died: 17 July 2006 (aged 90); Munich, Bavaria, Germany
- Other name: Elfriede Kuzmany-Wachsmann
- Occupation: Actress
- Years active: 1939-1997 (film & TV)

Elfriede Kuzmany (1915–2006) was an Austrian film and television actress.

== Selected filmography ==
- The Falling Star (1950)
- House of Life (1952)
- Black-White-Red Four Poster (1962)
- The River Line (1964)
- Madame Legros (1968, TV film)
- The Sternstein Manor (1976)
- The Woman from Sarajevo (1980, TV film)
- Der Schatz im Niemandsland (1987, TV miniseries)

== Bibliography ==
- Parrill, Sue & Robison, William B. The Tudors on Film and Television. McFarland, 2013.
