= Paul Hoffmann (actor) =

Actor and director Paul Hoffmann

- Born: 25 March 1902; Düsseldorf, German Empire
- Died: 2 December 1990 (aged 88); Vienna, Austria
- Occupation: Actor
- Years active: 1937-1990

Paul Hoffmann (25 March 1902 – 2 December 1990) was a German actor. He appeared in more than sixty films from 1937 to 1990. From 1968 to 1971 Hoffmann was director of the Burgtheater in Vienna.

== Selected filmography ==
Year	Title	Role	Notes
1937	My Friend Barbara	Dr. Reinerz	
1937	When Women Keep Silent	Ehemann	
1940	Bismarck	Count von Blome	
1942	Die Entlassung	Count Waldersee	
1943	The Big Number	Heinrich Wallner	
1949	The Last Illusion	Fechner	
1949	Love '47	Oberst	
1954	Portrait of an Unknown Woman	Philip Hernandez	
1959	The Ideal Woman	Stadtdirektor Rechnitz	
1959	Stalingrad: Dogs, Do You Want to Live Forever?	General Codreanu	
1959	A Doctor of Conviction	Generaldirektor Massmann	
1959	Kein Mann zum Heiraten	Karl Kruse	
1970	11 Uhr 20	Johnston	TV miniseries
