= Wolf Frees =

German actor (1909–1976)

- Born: Johann Wolfgang Max Müller; 8 October 1909; Potsdam, Germany
- Died: 23 November 1974 (aged 65)
- Other names: Woolf Frees, Wolf Fress, Wolf Frées
- Occupation: Actor
- Years active: 1950–1971

Wolf Frees, also credited as Wolfgang Müller-Frees, (8 October 1909 – 23 November 1974) was a German actor from Potsdam who worked in the British film industry. Frees left Germany in the mid-1930s as his wife was Jewish and persecuted by the Nazis. In films he usually played German military men. He had roles in The Guns of Navarone (1961), Four Horsemen of the Apocalypse (1962), Doctor Zhivago (1965) and The Saint TV series in the 1960s. His last acting credit dates to 1971.

== Filmography ==
| Year | Title | Role | Notes |
|---|---|---|---|
| 1950 | Odette | Major | Uncredited |
| 1952 | So Little Time | German Doctor | |
| 1953 | Appointment in London | German Luftwaffe Officer | Uncredited |
| 1954 | Betrayed | Motorcycle Rider | Uncredited |
| 1954 | The Green Carnation | Tony Scott | |
| 1956 | The Man Who Never Was | Admiral Canaris | Uncredited |
| 1956 | The Man Who Knew Too Much | Aide to Prime Minister | Uncredited |
| 1956 | Zarak | 1st Lounger | Uncredited |
| 1957 | The Steel Bayonet | German Divisional Commander | |
| 1957 | Count Five and Die | Brauner, shot spy | |
| 1958 | The Safecracker | German Commandant | |
| 1958 | Sea of Sand | German Sergeant | |
| 1960 | The Day They Robbed the Bank of England | Dr. Hagen | |
| 1961 | The Guns of Navarone | Radio Operator | Uncredited |
| 1962 | Four Horseman of the Apocalypse | Security Officer | Uncredited |
| 1965 | Operation Crossbow | German Police Inspector | |
| 1965 | The Heroes of Telemark | Sturmbannführer Knippelberg | |
| 1965 | Doctor Zhivago | Delegate Yelkin | |
| 1966 | The Investigation | Witness | TV film |
| 1967 | The Night of the Generals | German Officer at Raymounde's Apartment | Uncredited |
| 1971 | Zeppelin | German Naval Officer | Uncredited |
