= Gerlinde Locker =

Austrian actress (born 1938)

- Born: Gerlinde Locker; 28 April 1938 (age 87); Linz, Nazi Germany
- Occupation: Actress
- Years active: 1957–present

Gerlinde Locker (born 28 April 1938) is an Austrian actress.

== Selected filmography ==
- War of the Maidens (1957)
- The Star of Santa Clara (1958)
- One Should Be Twenty Again (1958)
- Sebastian Kneipp (1958)
- Endangered Girls (1958)
- Hello Taxi (1958)
- Candidates for Marriage (1958)
- My Daughter Patricia (1959)
- Girls for the Mambo-Bar (1959)
- Twelve Girls and One Man (1959)
- Do Not Send Your Wife to Italy (1960)
- The Forester's Daughter (1962)
- The Bandits of the Rio Grande (1965)
- The Swedish Girl (1965)
- Morning's at Seven (1968)
- Auch ich war nur ein mittelmäßiger Schüler (1974)
- Derrick - Season 8, Episode 8: "Prozente" (1981)
