= Sieghardt Rupp =

Austrian actor

- Rupp in 1967
- Born: 14 June 1931; Bregenz, Vorarlberg, Austria
- Died: 20 July 2015 (aged 84); Vienna, Austria

Sieghardt Rupp (14 June 1931 – 20 July 2015) was an Austrian actor who performed in film, television and theatre.

He made over 55 film and TV appearances beginning in 1959, with his career peaking in the 1960s. He became known for his performances in gangster or Western films in the 1960s where he typically portrayed a bandit or mercenary. His dark features, similar to those of his Italian co-stars meant that he could play Latin characters, such as Mexicans.

His most noted Western performance was his role as Esteban Rojo in Sergio Leone's 1964 production A Fistful of Dollars alongside Clint Eastwood and Gian Maria Volonté. He appeared in many other Westerns in the 1960s such as Blood at Sundown (1966) although he appeared in the romantic adventure Angelique and the Sultan in 1968.

During the 1970s, his film career diminished. However, he portrayed several TV characters afterwards, notably in Tatort as Border Patrol Investigator Kressin between 1971 and 1973. From 1985 he performed at the Theater in der Josefstadt in Vienna on stage. He retired from film and television acting in 1995, and died in Vienna in 2015 at the age of 84.

== Selected filmography ==
- 1959: Girls for the Mambo-Bar – Tommy Kersten
- 1960: Die Glocke ruft – Franz Stadler
- 1960: Twenty Brave Men – Petros
- 1960: Wegen Verführung Minderjähriger – Prosecutor
- 1960: Heimweh nach dir, mein grünes Tal – Fred Schantl, Verwalter
- 1961: Until Hell Is Frozen – Lauterbach
- 1961: Der Orgelbauer von St. Marien – Bruder Markus Burgmann
- 1962: Deutschland – deine Sternchen – Kurzweil
- 1962: The Red Frenzy – Karl
- 1962: Lulu – Schwarz
- 1962: Waldrausch – Crispin Sagenbacher
- 1962: Mariandl's Homecoming – Deininger
- 1962: Wild Water – Markus Mautner
- 1962: The Bandit and the Princess – Wirtssohn Georg
- 1962: The Forester's Daughter – Franz Földessy aka Rittmeister Franz Koltai
- 1963: The Lightship – Eugen
- 1963: Stop Train 349 – (uncredited)
- 1963: An Alibi for Death – Leopold Wasneck
- 1964: The Last Ride to Santa Cruz – Fernando
- 1964: Tim Frazer and the Mysterious Mister X – Jack van Druten
- 1964: A Fistful of Dollars – Esteban Rojo
- 1964: Condemned to Sin – Hermann Starosta
- 1964: Among Vultures – Preston
- 1965: Man Called Gringo – Reno
- 1965: Red Dragon – Pierre Milot
- 1965: Kingdom of the Silver Lion – Abu Seif
- 1966: The Fountain of Love – Nils Hansen
- 1966: I Am Looking for a Man – Direktor Voss
- 1966: Der Weibsteufel – Der Gendarm
- 1966: Who Killed Johnny R.? – Captain Jason Conroy
- 1966: La Grande Vadrouille – Lt. Stuermer
- 1966: Blood at Sundown – Ralph
- 1967: Five Golden Dragons – Peterson
- 1967: Midsummer Night – Aslak
- 1967: Untamable Angelique – Millerand
- 1967: La lunga sfida – Gert Schneider
- 1968: Angelique and the Sultan – Millerand (uncredited)
- 1968: The Killer Likes Candy – Ali
- 1968: 69 Liebesspiele – Rosmann
- 1968: Bübchen – Achims Vater
- 1969: The Seven Red Berets – Captain Brandt
- 1969: The Brazen Women of Balzac – Georg
- 1969: Heintje: A Heart Goes on a Journey – Günter Schelle
- 1969: The Sweet Pussycats – Oberst
- 1969: Spion unter der Haube (TV film) – John Marple
- 1971: Heißer Sand (TV film) – Arthur Durban
- 1971: Tatort: Kressin und der tote Mann im Fleet (TV) – Zollfahnder Kressin
- 1971: Tatort: Kressin und der Laster nach Lüttich (TV) – Zollfahnder Kressin
- 1971: Tatort: Kressin stoppt den Nordexpress (TV) – Zollfahnder Kressin
- 1971: Captain Typhoon – Rodrigo
- 1972: Tatort: Kressin und die Frau des Malers (TV) – Zollfahnder Kressin
- 1972: Tatort: Kressin und der Mann mit dem gelben Koffer (TV) – Zollfahnder Kressin
- 1973: Dead Pigeon on Beethoven Street – Kressin
- 1973: Tatort: Kressin und die zwei Damen aus Jade (TV) – Zollfahnder Kressin
- 1974: Wer stirbt schon gerne unter Palmen – Heller
- 1979: Breakthrough – Cpl. Rothe (uncredited)
- 1981: Der Bockerer – Herr Hermann
- 1983: Derrick: Lohmanns innerer Frieden (TV) – Werner Schorff
- 1984: Heinrich IV. (TV film) – Enrico
- 1985: Derrick: Gregs Trompete (TV) – Andreas Klinger
- 1987: Minna von Barnhelm (TV film) – Major von Tellheim
- 1987: Derrick: Nur Ärger mit dem Mann aus Rom (TV) – Ewald Scholler
- 1989: Professor Bernhardi (TV film) – Prof. Dr. Flint
- 1990: Weiningers Nacht – Leopold Weininger / Sigmund Freud
- 1990: Tatort: Seven Eleven (TV) – Ferdl Willek
- 1990: SOKO München: Mit letztem Einsatz (TV) – Rollauscher
- 1994: Etwas am Herzen (TV film) – Paul
- 1995: Die Spanische Fliege (TV film) – Ludwig Baumann (final film role)

== External links and sources ==
- Sieghardt Rupp at IMDb
