= List of West German films of 1969 =

List of films produced in West Germany in 1969

List of West German films of 1969. Feature films produced and distributed in West Germany in 1969.

== Feature films ==
Title	Director	Cast	Genre	Notes
99 Women	Jesús Franco	Maria Schell, Mercedes McCambridge, Herbert Lom, Luciana Paluzzi	Exploitation	Spanish-Italian-West German-British co-production
Agilok & Blubbo	Peter Schneider	Robert Walker Jr., Rosy Rosy	Comedy	a.k.a. Agilok and Blubbo a.k.a. Agilok und Blubbo
Angels of the Street	Jürgen Roland	Horst Frank, Herbert Fux, Werner Pochath	Crime drama	
The Animals' Conference	Curt Linda	—N/a	Animated	a.k.a. Animals United a.k.a. The Conference of the Animals
Argila	Werner Schroeter	Carla Egerer, Magdalena Montezuma, Gisela Trowe	Experimental	Short film
Battle of Neretva	Veljko Bulajić	Yul Brynner, Orson Welles, Franco Nero, Curd Jürgens, Hardy Krüger, Sylva Koscina	War, Epic	Yugoslav-West German-Italian-American co-production
Battle of the Commandos	Umberto Lenzi	Jack Palance, Curd Jürgens, Thomas Hunter, Wolfgang Preiss	War	Italian-Spanish-West German-Swiss co-production
Bezeten, Het Gat in de Muur	Pim de la Parra	Alexandra Stewart, Dieter Geissler	Drama	a.k.a. Obsessions. Dutch-West German co-production
Bonaventure	Hermann Kutscher	Erika Pluhar, Louise Martini, Klausjürgen Wussow	Drama	a.k.a. The High Ground a.k.a. Schwester Bonaventura. Austrian-West German co-production
The Brazen Women of Balzac	Giuseppe Zaccariello	Edwige Fenech, Michaela May, Angelika Ott, Joachim Hansen, Sieghardt Rupp, Ralf Wolter, Gustav Knuth	Sex comedy	
Cardillac	Edgar Reitz	Hans Christian Blech, Catana Cayetano	Drama	
The Castle of Fu Manchu	Jesús Franco	Christopher Lee, Richard Greene, Maria Perschy, Günther Stoll	Thriller	Spanish-West German-British-Italian co-production
Charley's Uncle	Werner Jacobs	Gila von Weitershausen, Karl Michael Vogler, Gustav Knuth, Heinz Erhardt	Comedy	
The Damned	Luchino Visconti	Helmut Berger, Dirk Bogarde, Ingrid Thulin, Helmut Griem, Reinhard Kolldehoff, Charlotte Rampling	Drama	Italian-West German co-production. Nominated for Oscar (Best foreign director)
De Sade	Cy Endfield	Keir Dullea, Senta Berger, John Huston, Lilli Palmer, Sonja Ziemann, Christiane Krüger	Biography	West German-American co-production
Dead Body on Broadway	Harald Reinl	George Nader, Heinz Weiss	Thriller	Jerry Cotton film
Death Knocks Twice	Harald Philipp	Dean Reed, Nadja Tiller, Anita Ekberg, Fabio Testi, Werner Peters, Adolfo Celi, Leon Askin	Crime	West German-Italian co-production
Detectives	Rudolf Thome	Ulli Lommel, Marquard Bohm, Uschi Obermaier, Iris Berben	Crime	
Double Face	Riccardo Freda	Klaus Kinski, Christiane Krüger, Margaret Lee, Sydney Chaplin	Thriller	Based on Edgar Wallace. Italian-West German co-production
Dr. Fabian: Laughing Is the Best Medicine	Harald Reinl	Hans-Joachim Kulenkampff, Martin Held, Maria Perschy, Elisabeth Flickenschildt, Monika Peitsch	Comedy	
Ein dreifach Hoch dem Sanitätsgefreiten Neumann	Franz Marischka	Siegfried Rauch, Christiane Rücker, Hubert von Meyerinck, Rudolf Prack, Mario Novelli, Luisa Rivelli	Sex comedy	West German-Italian co-production
Eika Katappa	Werner Schroeter	Magdalena Montezuma, Gisela Trowe, Carla Egerer, Rosy Rosy	Experimental	
Ellenbogenspiele	Wolfgang Becker	Susanne von Sass, Jochen Busse, Henry van Lyck, Margot Trooger, Konrad Georg	Comedy	a.k.a. Hilfe! Ich bin noch Jungfrau!
Les Étrangers	Jean-Pierre Desagnat	Senta Berger, Michel Constantin, Julián Mateos, Hans Meyer	Thriller	a.k.a. The Strangers. French-Spanish-West German-Italian co-production
The Girl from Rio	Jesús Franco	Shirley Eaton, Richard Wyler, George Sanders, Herbert Fleischmann, Walter Rilla	Thriller	Spanish-American-West German co-production
Das Go-Go-Girl vom Blow-Up	Rolf Olsen	Monika Lundi, Eddi Arent, Gunther Philipp, Ann Smyrner, Fritz Wepper, Beppo Brem	Comedy	a.k.a. Ich betone – oben ohne. West German-Swiss co-production
Hate Is My God	Claudio Gora	Tony Kendall, Herbert Fleischmann, Gunther Philipp, Herbert Fux	Western	Italian-West German co-production
Heintje: A Heart Goes on a Journey	Werner Jacobs	Heintje, Heinz Reincke, Gerlinde Locker, Sieghardt Rupp, Ralf Wolter	Musical	
Helgalein	Herbert Ballmann	Anita Kupsch, Heidi Stroh, Rolf Zacher	Comedy	
Help, I Love Twins	Peter Weck	Roy Black, Uschi Glas, Georg Thomalla, Eddi Arent	Comedy	
Herzblatt oder Wie sag ich’s meiner Tochter?	Alfred Vohrer	Georg Thomalla, Mascha Gonska, Siegfried Schürenberg, Günther Lüders, Wolfgang Schneider, Gernot Endemann, Frithjof Vierock	Comedy	
Hugo, the Woman Chaser	Hans Albin	Peter Garden, Ini Assmann, Beppo Brem	Comedy	
Hunting Scenes from Bavaria	Peter Fleischmann	Martin Sperr, Angela Winkler, Hanna Schygulla	Drama	
Hurra, die Schule brennt!	Werner Jacobs	Hansi Kraus, Theo Lingen, Rudolf Schündler, Heintje, Peter Alexander	Comedy	a.k.a. Hurrah, the School Is Burning. Die Lümmel von der ersten Bank film series
I'm an Elephant, Madame	Peter Zadek	Wolfgang Schneider, Heinz Baumann, Guido Baumann, Margot Trooger, Günther Lüders	Drama	Won a Silver Bear at Berlin
If You Play with Crazy Birds	Gustav Ehmck	Margarethe von Trotta, Horst Janson, Jürgen Draeger	Drama	
Katzelmacher	Rainer Werner Fassbinder	Hanna Schygulla, Rainer Werner Fassbinder, Hans Hirschmüller, Elga Sorbas, Rudolf Waldemar Brem, Lilith Ungerer, Harry Baer, Irm Hermann	Drama	
Kiss Me Monster	Jesús Franco	Janine Reynaud, Rosanna Yanni, Adrian Hoven, Chris Howland	Crime	Spanish-West German co-production
Klassenkeile	Franz Josef Gottlieb	Uschi Glas, Walter Giller, Werner Finck	Comedy	
Klein Erna auf dem Jungfernstieg	Hans Heinrich	Gitta Zeidler, Heidi Kabel, Harald Juhnke, Heinz Erhardt	Comedy	
Kommissar X – Drei goldene Schlangen	Roberto Mauri	Tony Kendall, Brad Harris	Eurospy thriller	a.k.a. Three Golden Serpents a.k.a. Island of Lost Girls. Kommissar X film. West German-Italian co-production
Köpfchen in das Wasser, Schwänzchen in die Höh’	Helmut Förnbacher	Gila von Weitershausen, Helmut Förnbacher, Konrad Georg, William Berger, Barbara Valentin	Sex comedy	
Kuckucksei im Gangsternest	Franz-Josef Spieker	Hanna Schygulla, Herbert Fux, Rainer Basedow, Philipp Sonntag	Comedy	
Let It All Hang Out	Franz Marischka	Edwige Fenech, Marcella Michelangeli, Willy Colombini, Rainer Basedow, Gigi Bonos, Rolf Eden	Sex comedy	a.k.a. Der Mann mit dem goldenen Pinsel. Italian-West German co-production
Love Birds	Mario Caiano	O. W. Fischer, Christine Kaufmann, Claudine Auger, Tony Kendall	Drama	Italian-West German co-production
Love Is Colder Than Death	Rainer Werner Fassbinder	Ulli Lommel, Rainer Werner Fassbinder, Hanna Schygulla	Crime drama	Entered into the 19th Berlin International Film Festival
Madame and Her Niece	Eberhard Schröder	Ruth Maria Kubitschek, Edwige Fenech, Fred Williams	Sex comedy	
Madame Bovary	Hans Schott-Schöbinger	Edwige Fenech, Gerhard Riedmann, Peter Carsten	Softcore	a.k.a. The Sins of Madame Bovary. West German-Italian co-production
Man on Horseback	Volker Schlöndorff	David Warner, Anna Karina, Thomas Holtzmann, Anton Diffring, Anita Pallenberg	Drama	a.k.a. Michael Kohlhaas. Entered into the 1969 Cannes Film Festival
The Man with the Glass Eye	Alfred Vohrer	Horst Tappert, Karin Hübner, Fritz Wepper, Hubert von Meyerinck, Stefan Behrens, Christiane Krüger, Iris Berben	Mystery thriller	a.k.a. Terror on Half Moon Street. Based on Edgar Wallace
Marquis de Sade: Justine	Jesús Franco	Klaus Kinski, Romina Power, Maria Rohm, Jack Palance, Akim Tamiroff, Sylva Koscina, Horst Frank, Harald Leipnitz, Mercedes McCambridge	Drama	West German-Italian co-production
Mattanza – ein Liebestraum	Jerzy Macc	Rita Scherrer, Günther Stoll, Rolf Eden, Charlotte Kerr, Hans Paetsch	Drama	
More	Barbet Schroeder	Mimsy Farmer, Klaus Grünberg, Heinz Engelmann	Drama	French-West German-Luxembourgian co-production
Naughty Roommates	Franz Antel	Teri Tordai, Andrea Rau, Heidy Bohlen, Ralf Wolter, Rudolf Schündler, Jacques Herlin, Fritz Muliar	Sex comedy	Austrian-West German co-production
Neurasia	Werner Schroeter	Carla Egerer, Magdalena Montezuma	Experimental	Short film
The New Adventures of Snow White	Rolf Thiele	Marie Liljedahl, Walter Giller, Ingrid van Bergen	Sex comedy, Fantasy	a.k.a. Grimms' Fairy Tales – For Adults Only
On the Reeperbahn at Half Past Midnight	Rolf Olsen (US version: Al Adamson)	Curd Jürgens, Heinz Reincke, Diana Körner, Fritz Wepper	Drama	
Our Doctor is the Best	Harald Vock	Roy Black, Helga Anders, Georg Thomalla, Joachim Hansen	Comedy	
Pepe, der Paukerschreck	Harald Reinl	Hansi Kraus, Theo Lingen, Rudolf Schündler, Hans Clarin, Hannelore Elsner	Comedy	Die Lümmel von der ersten Bank film series
Rabbit in the Pit	Roger Fritz	Helga Anders, Ray Lovelock, Anthony Steel, Françoise Prévost	Drama	
Scarabea: How Much Land Does a Man Need?	Hans-Jürgen Syberberg	Nicoletta Machiavelli, Walter Buschhoff	Drama	
Season of the Senses	Massimo Franciosa	Udo Kier, Laura Belli, Susanne von Sass, Eva Thulin	Drama	Italian-West German co-production
Seven Days Grace	Alfred Vohrer	Joachim Fuchsberger, Horst Tappert, Konrad Georg, Karin Hübner, Petra Schürmann	Crime, Mystery	a.k.a. 7 Days Grace a.k.a. School of Fear. Entered into the 6th Moscow International Film Festival
The Seven Red Berets	Mario Siciliano	Ivan Rassimov, Sieghardt Rupp, Kirk Morris, Serge Nubret, Arthur Brauss	War	a.k.a. The 7 Red Berets. Italian-West German co-production
The Sweet Pussycats	Giuseppe Zaccariello	Edwige Fenech, Sieghardt Rupp, Ernst Stankovski, Ralf Wolter, Angelika Ott, Barbara Capell	Sex comedy	a.k.a. The Blonde and the Black Pussycat
Ein Tag ist schöner als der andere	Kurt Hoffmann	Vivi Bach	Comedy	
That Guy Loves Me, Am I Supposed to Believe That?	Marran Gosov	Uschi Glas, Harald Leipnitz, Stefan Behrens, Horst Janson	Comedy	
Two Undercover Angels	Jesús Franco	Janine Reynaud, Rosanna Yanni, Adrian Hoven, Chris Howland	Crime	Spanish-West German co-production
The Unnaturals	Antonio Margheriti	Joachim Fuchsberger, Marianne Koch, Helga Anders	Horror	Italian-West German co-production
Up the Establishment	Michael Verhoeven	Gila von Weitershausen, Mario Adorf	Comedy	
A Waltz Dream	Fred Kraus	Margit Schramm, Wolfgang Siesz, Peter Kraus, Viktor de Kowa, Herta Staal	Musical	West German-Austrian co-production
The Wedding Trip	Ralf Gregan	Liselotte Pulver, Dieter Hallervorden	Comedy	West German-Italian co-production
When Sweet Moonlight Is Sleeping in the Hills	Wolfgang Liebeneiner	Luitgard Im, Werner Bruhns, Werner Hinz, Diana Körner, Rolf Zacher, Susanne Uhlen	Comedy	
Why Did I Ever Say Yes Twice?	Franz Antel	Lando Buzzanca, Teri Tordai, Raffaella Carrà, Peter Weck, Franco Giacobini, Andrea Rau, Ann Smyrner, Jacques Herlin, Willy Millowitsch, Heinz Erhardt	Sex comedy	a.k.a. The Viking Who Became a Bigamist. Italian-West German co-production
A Woman Needs Loving	Robert Azderball	Eva Renzi, Horst Janson, Barbara Rütting, Hans Clarin	Drama	
The Young Tigers of Hong Kong	Ernst Hofbauer	Robert Woods, Werner Pochath, Véronique Vendell, Ralf Wolter	Crime	a.k.a. Women for Sale
Your Caresses	Herbert Vesely, Peter Schamoni	Doris Kunstmann, Ulli Lommel, Bernhard Wicki, Charlotte Kerr	Drama	a.k.a. Deine Zärtlichkeiten
Zeit für Träumer	Wolfgang Urchs	Dagmar Kekulé, Kim Parnass	Comedy	

== Documentaries and television films ==
Title	Director	Cast	Genre	Notes
Abschied von Olga	Klaus Kirschner	Giulia Follina	Drama	
Adrienne Mesurat	Oscar Fritz Schuh	Ruth Niehaus, Richard Lauffen, Sigfrit Steiner	Drama	a.k.a. The Closed Garden
The Age of the Fish	Eberhard Itzenplitz	Heinz Bennent	Drama	a.k.a. Nur der Freiheit gehört unser Leben
Ahnenerbe	Ludwig Cremer	Peter Lühr, Doris Schade, Hellmut Lange, Arno Assmann, Werner Kreindl	War	
Al Capone im deutschen Wald	Franz Peter Wirth	Will Danin, Angelika Bender, Rainer Werner Fassbinder, Christof Wackernagel	Crime	
All Women Are One	Günter Gräwert	Günter Pfitzmann, Lola Müthel, Bum Krüger	Comedy	a.k.a. Das große Los
Alma Mater	Rolf Hädrich	Karl Guttmann	Drama	
Alte Kameraden	Franz Peter Wirth	Horst Bergmann, Gustl Bayrhammer, Günther Ungeheuer, Konrad Georg	Crime comedy	a.k.a. The Case of Oskar Daubmann
Altersgenossen	Hagen Mueller-Stahl	Wolfram Weniger, Karl-Heinz von Hassel	Drama	
Amerika, or The Man Who Disappeared	Zbyněk Brynych	Sylvester Fell, Curt Bois, Albert Lieven, Walter Richter, Werner Kreindl, Helena Růžičková, Klaus Löwitsch, Helga Anders, Monica Bleibtreu	Drama	
And Then There Were None	Hans Quest	Werner Peters, Alexander Kerst, Rolf Boysen, Günther Neutze, Alfred Schieske	Mystery thriller	
The Arsonists	Klaus Lemke	Margarethe von Trotta, Iris Berben	Drama	
Asternplatz 10 Uhr 6	Karlheinz Bieber	Hans Deppe, Ilse Pagé	Drama	
Attentat auf den Mächtigen	Herbert Ballmann	Claudia Wedekind, Friedrich Maurer, Harry Wüstenhagen	Crime comedy	
Der Attentäter	Rainer Erler	Fritz Hollenbeck	Docudrama	a.k.a. Der Attentäter – Georg Elser
Auch schon im alten Rom	Lutz Büscher	Robert Meyn, Hanne Wieder	Comedy	
Bahnübergang	Rainer Erler	Hans Beerhenke	Crime	a.k.a. The Railway Crossing a.k.a. The Level Crossing
Beaumarchais	Günter Meincke	Helmut Wildt	Biography	a.k.a. Beaumarchais – Revolutionär, Höfling und Geheimagent
Bericht einer Offensive	Hagen Mueller-Stahl	Hannes Messemer, Wolfgang Büttner, Hans Caninenberg, Günther Schramm, Arthur Brauss	War	a.k.a. Paths of Glory
Bischof Ketteler	Hans Dieter Schwarze	Hans Caninenberg	Biography	a.k.a. Bishop Ketteler
Bitte recht freundlich, es wird geschossen	Rolf von Sydow	Walter Wilz, Grit Boettcher, Verena Buss, Lil Dagover, Klaus Schwarzkopf, Alfred Schieske, Hubert Suschka, Alexander Hegarth, Klaus Höhne, Karl Walter Diess	Thriller	a.k.a. Watch the Birdies
Bleibe lasse	Gedeon Kovács	Joseph Offenbach, Tilli Breidenbach	Anthology	
Der Bürger als Edelmann	Hellmuth Matiasek	Josef Meinrad, Cornelia Froboess, Klaus Wildbolz	Comedy	a.k.a. Le Bourgeois gentilhomme
Caesar and Cleopatra	Ulrich Erfurth	O. E. Hasse, Violetta Ferrari, Alexander Kerst, Werner Finck	Drama	
Ein Charleston für Lady Mac' Beth	Rolf von Sydow	Anita Kupsch, Ralf Wolter, Dagmar Altrichter, Benno Sterzenbach	Crime comedy	
Christoph Kolumbus oder Die Entdeckung Amerikas	Helmut Käutner	Karl Michael Vogler, Hannelore Elsner, Theo Lingen, Hans Clarin	Comedy	
Color Me German	Victor Vicas	James Edwards, Ron Williams, Elfie Fiegert, Rosemarie Fendel, Helmut Fischer, Ludwig Schmid-Wildy, Franziska Liebing	Drama	NBC Experiment in Television. American-West German co-production
Confession of a Murderer	Wilm ten Haaf	Christoph Bantzer, Hannelore Elsner, Pinkas Braun, Helmut Förnbacher, Wolfgang Lukschy, Ellen Schwiers	Drama	
Cousin Bazilio	Wilhelm Semmelroth	Diana Körner, Hans von Borsody	Drama	
Damenquartett	Eberhard Fechner	Sonja Karzau, Karl Lieffen, Günter Strack	Crime comedy	
Diary of a Serial Killer	Helmut Käutner	Helmut Qualtinger, Siegfried Lowitz, Günter Pfitzmann, Ingrid van Bergen, Paul Klinger	Black comedy	a.k.a. Tagebuch eines Frauenmörders
Doppelagent George Blake	Georg Marischka	Gerd Vespermann, Ingeborg Schöner, Katrin Schaake	Docudrama, Cold War spy film	
Die Dubrow-Krise	Eberhard Itzenplitz	Traugott Buhre, Hans Häckermann	Science fiction	
Ende eines Leichtgewichts	Michael Kehlmann	Horst Niendorf, Felix Franchy, Walter Buschhoff, Konrad Georg	Drama, Sport	
Epitaph für einen König	Fritz Umgelter	Karl Walter Diess, Luitgard Im, Monica Bleibtreu, Werner Kreindl, Rolf Boysen, Richard Münch, Jörg Pleva	Drama	a.k.a. Carl XII
Es lebe der Tod	Diethard Klante	Günter Mack, Rolf Becker, Sonja Karzau, Peter Lühr, Rudolf Schündler	Drama, War	
The Eternal Husband	Stanislav Barabáš	Günter Mack, Jozef Kroner, Brigitte Skay, Michaela May, Inken Sommer	Drama	
The Excursion to Tilsit	Günter Gräwert	Karl Michael Vogler, Ruth Maria Kubitschek, Violetta Ferrari, Gustav Knuth, Paul Dahlke, Vadim Glowna	Drama	a.k.a. The Journey to Tilsit
Der Fall Liebknecht-Luxemburg	Theo Mezger	Martin Benrath, Gerd Baltus, Günter Mack, Richard Lauffen, Edith Heerdegen	Docudrama	
La Felicità	Raoul Wolfgang Schnell	Margot Leonard, Carlos Estrada, Angelo Infanti, Alexander May	Drama	
Fememord	Theo Mezger	Hans Peter Hallwachs, Karl-Heinz von Hassel, Karl-Georg Saebisch	Docudrama	
Fink und Fliederbusch	Peter Beauvais	Harald Harth, Hans Jaray, Guido Wieland	Comedy	
Die Flucht nach Ägypten	Karl Heinz Deickert	Walter Giller	Drama	
The Flying Doctors of East Africa	Werner Herzog		Documentary	
Das Foto	Rudolf Küfner	Hans Caninenberg, Hannelore Schroth	Drama	a.k.a. The Photograph
Fragestunde	Tom Toelle	Hans Korte, Werner Peters, Heinz Baumann, Alexander May, Wolfgang Büttner, Gert Westphal	Drama	
Frei bis zum nächsten Mal	Korbinian Köberle	Václav Voska, Walter Sedlmayr	Drama	
Die Freier	Fritz Umgelter	Luitgard Im, Géza Tordy, Ulli Philipp	Comedy	a.k.a. The Suitors
Friedrich Ebert – Geburt einer Republik	Hermann Kugelstadt	Kurd Pieritz, Hans Paetsch, Richard Münch, Christian Doermer	Docudrama, History	
Friedrich Ebert und Gustav Stresemann, Schicksalsjahre der Republik	Hermann Kugelstadt	Kurd Pieritz, Dieter Wagner	Docudrama, History	
Der Gerechte	Ceco Zamurovich	Karl-Georg Saebisch, Anfried Krämer, Arthur Brauss	War, Drama	
The Glass Menagerie	Ludwig Cremer	Elfriede Irrall, Ralf Schermuly, Grete Mosheim, Christoph Bantzer	Drama	
Gnade für Timothy Evans	Korbinian Köberle	Friedrich G. Beckhaus, Josef Fröhlich	Crime drama	
Goldene Städte	Egon Monk	Ernst Jacobi	Drama	a.k.a. Their Very Own and Golden City
Goldmacher Tausend	Theo Mezger	Rudolf Wessely, Klaus Schwarzkopf, Hans Korte, Gert Westphal, Heinz Moog, Ulrich Matschoss, Arno Assmann	Docudrama, Crime comedy	a.k.a. Franz Tausend
Goya	Wilhelm Semmelroth	Wolfgang Büttner, Ellen Schwiers, Bernhard Minetti	Biography	
Der große Tag der Berta Laube	Dieter Meichsner	Angelika Hurwicz	Drama	
Die grüne Nacht von Ziegenberg	Gerd Winkler	Michael Hinz, Ulla Berkéwicz, Balduin Baas, Günter Strack	Comedy, Horror	
Hauptsache Minister	Imo Moszkowicz	Hans Söhnker, Karin Eickelbaum, Reiner Schöne	Comedy	
Der Hausfreund	Hellmuth Matiasek	Walter Jokisch, Dirk Dautzenberg	Comedy	
Herr Wolff hat seine Krise	Rainer Erler	Alexander May	Comedy	
Home Sweet Honeycomb	Heinz Schirk	Hans Christian Rudolph, Edda Seippel, Robert Freitag, Dagmar Biener, Barbara Schöne	Science fiction	a.k.a. O süße Geborgenheit
Horror	Peter Lilienthal	Vadim Glowna	Thriller	Based on Henry Farrell's novel How Awful About Allan
Hôtel du Commerce	Hans Lietzau	Carla Hagen, Richard Münch, Gisela Uhlen, Klaus Schwarzkopf, Hans Korte, Angelika Hurwicz, Stanislav Ledinek	Drama, War	a.k.a. Boule de Suif
Hotel Royal	Wolfgang Becker	Joachim Fuchsberger, Nadja Tiller, Paul Hubschmid, Lil Dagover, Pinkas Braun, Anthony Steel	Mystery	
How Say You?	Imo Moszkowicz	Heidelinde Weis, Harald Leipnitz, Paul Dahlke, Hilde Krahl, Ralf Wolter	Comedy	a.k.a. Liebe gegen Paragraphen
Hürdenlauf	Thomas Fantl	Ulrich Faulhaber, Wolfgang Preiss, Manfred Seipold, Gernot Endemann, Claudia Butenuth, Barbara Schöne	Drama	
Im Auftrag der schwarzen Front	Ludwig Cremer	Willi Kowalj, Günter Strack, Werner Kreindl	Docudrama	
In dieser Hölle	Gedeon Kovács	Hans W. Hamacher, Berta Drews, Matthias Ponnier	Drama	
In the Grip of Life	Wilm ten Haaf	Lola Müthel, Alexander Hegarth, Alexander Engel, Siegfried Wischnewski	Drama	a.k.a. Vom Teufel geholt
Das Interview	Gerhard Klingenberg	Lil Dagover, Heidi Brühl	Drama	
Der irische Freiheitskampf	Wolfgang Schleif	Karl Michael Vogler	Docudrama	
Jacques Offenbach	Rudolf Jugert	Pinkas Braun, Herbert Bötticher, Colette Lorand	Biography, Music	
Jean der Träumer	Lutz Büscher	Heidelinde Weis, Harald Leipnitz, Wolfgang Spier	Comedy	a.k.a. Jean de la Lune
Julius Caesar	Michael Kehlmann	Erich Schellow, Hannes Messemer, Rolf Boysen, Carl Lange, Gerd Baltus	Drama	a.k.a. Das Trauerspiel von Julius Caesar
Kaddish for the Living	Karl Fruchtmann	Günter Mack, Zalman Lebiush, Rudolf Wessely	Drama	West German-Israeli co-production
Der Kampf um den Reigen	Theo Mezger	Ernst Fritz Fürbringer, Wolfgang Büttner, Konrad Georg, Günther Jerschke, Herbert Fleischmann	Docudrama	
Kellerassel	Gedeon Kovács	Walter Bluhm, Ilse Pagé, Hans Söhnker	Comedy	
Der Kidnapper	Tom Toelle	Ralf Gregan, Immy Schell, Eva Brumby, Gert Haucke, Rolf Moebius	Crime	
Kim Philby war der dritte Mann	Helmut Ashley	Arno Assmann, Herbert Bötticher, Harald Juhnke, Werner Hinz	Docudrama, Cold War spy film	a.k.a. Kim Philby war der 3. Mann
Die Kleinbürger	Werner Schlechte	Wolfgang Schenck, Wolfgang Engels, Günter Strack, Claudia Wedekind, Renate Schroeter	Drama	a.k.a. The Philistines
Ein kleines Fest	Wilm ten Haaf	Marlene Riphahn, Konrad Georg	Drama	
Kollege Bindelmann	Heinz Schirk	Heinz Peter Scholz	Drama	
Die Kommode	Kurt Wilhelm	Willy Reichert, Valerie von Martens, Robert Meyn, Edith Heerdegen	Comedy	
Die Kuba-Krise 1962	Rudolf Nussgruber	Helmut Förnbacher, Werner Kreindl, Hellmut Lange, Hans Paetsch, Konrad Georg, Ernst Fritz Fürbringer, Erik Schumann	Docudrama	a.k.a. The Cuban Missile Crisis
Langeweile	Werner Völger	Martha Wallner, Heinz Baumann	Drama	
Der Lauf des Bösen	Ludwig Cremer	Uta Hallant, Christoph Bantzer, Gisela Trowe, Horst Bollmann, Hubert von Meyerinck, Walter Richter	Drama	
A Legacy	Walter Rilla	Michael Lenz, Andreas Seyferth, Karin Anselm, Gerlinde Locker, Ruth Maria Kubitschek, Alexander Kerst, Heinz Moog, Alfred Balthoff, Hans Jaray, Herbert Fleischmann	Drama	a.k.a. Das Vermächtnis
Ludwig van	Mauricio Kagel		Documentary, Music	
Mam'zelle Nitouche	Wolfgang Liebeneiner	Isy Orén, Hans Clarin, Wolfgang Lukschy, Ferry Gruber	Musical	a.k.a. Mamsell Nitouche
Marinemeuterei 1917	Hermann Kugelstadt	Karl-Heinz von Hassel, Volkert Kraeft, Claus Wilcke, Heinz Weiss, Hans Paetsch	Docudrama, War	
The Measure of Victory	Dietrich Haugk	Wolfgang Reichmann, Klausjürgen Wussow	Drama	a.k.a. Asche des Sieges
The Miser	Otto Tausig	Max Mairich, Chariklia Baxevanos	Comedy	a.k.a. Der Geizige
Mister Barnett	Wolfgang Liebeneiner	Kurt Ehrhardt, Diana Körner, Horst Bollmann, Louise Martini	Drama	a.k.a. Mr. Barnett a.k.a. Monsieur Barnett
The Misused Love Letters	Hans Dieter Schwarze	Angela Winkler, Günter Strack, Udo Vioff	Drama	
Moon Over the River	Oswald Döpke	Walter Taub, Edith Heerdegen, Wolfgang Engels, Karin Anselm	Drama	a.k.a. Mond über dem Fluß
Nachrede auf Klara Heydebreck	Eberhard Fechner		Documentary	
Nachrichten aus der Provinz	Claus Peter Witt	Paul Edwin Roth, Werner Bruhns, Heidi Stroh, Gustl Bayrhammer, Elisabeth Wiedemann, Katharina Brauren	Anthology, Comedy	
Neu-Böseckendorf	Robert A. Stemmle	Walter Richter	Drama	
The Penkovsky Papers	Paul May	Heinz Weiss, Horst Michael Neutze	Docudrama, Cold War spy film	a.k.a. Call Me Alex
Pistolen-Jenny	Alfred Weidenmann	Liselotte Pulver, Helmut Schmid, Siegfried Rauch, Günther Lüders, Ralf Wolter	Musical comedy, Western	
Precautions Against Fanatics	Werner Herzog		Short	
Der Punkt "M"	Oswald Döpke	Paul Dahlke, Rolf Becker	Historical drama, War	a.k.a. Der Punkt "M" – Eine szenische Fiktion zur Geschichte der Atombombe
Queen of the Night	Wolfgang Schleif	Dagmar Koller, Peter Minich, Theo Lingen, Peter Weck, Suzanne Doucet	Musical	a.k.a. Königin einer Nacht
Ramon Yendias Flucht	Oswald Döpke	Walter Giller	Drama	a.k.a. The Dark Night of Ramon Yendia
The Rats	Peter Beauvais	Sabine Sinjen, Inge Meysel, Reinhard Kolldehoff, Uwe Friedrichsen	Drama	
Das Rätsel von Piskov	Karl Peter Biltz	Hellmut Lange, Hannelore Elsner, Wolfgang Büttner	Science fiction	a.k.a. The Mystery of Piskov
The Relapse	August Everding	Peter Pasetti, Romuald Pekny, Ingrid Andree, Christa Berndl, Martin Lüttge, Heinz Baumann	Comedy	a.k.a. Der Rückfall
A Respectable Wedding	Rainer Wolffhardt	Veronika Fitz, Josef Fröhlich, Fritz von Friedl	Comedy	a.k.a. Die Kleinbürgerhochzeit
Die Revolte	Reinhard Hauff	Hans Brenner, Raimund Harmstorf, Katrin Schaake, Marquard Bohm, Hanna Schygulla, Arthur Brauss	Drama	
Roots	Hans-Reinhard Müller	Christiane Schröder, Marianne Hoppe, Willi Rose, Joseph Offenbach, Klaus Löwitsch	Drama	a.k.a. Tag für Tag
Rotmord	Peter Zadek	Gerd Baltus, Siegfried Wischnewski, Wolfgang Neuss	Historical drama	
Die Rückkehr	Peter Beauvais	Hilde Hessmann, Alfred Cogho, Michael Degen, Katinka Hoffmann	Drama	
Rumpelstilz	Peter Beauvais	Martin Held, Paula Wessely, Cordula Trantow, Volkert Kraeft	Drama	
Sag’s dem Weihnachtsmann	Rainer Wolffhardt	Heinz Rühmann, Doris Schade	Drama	
Der Schelm von Istanbul	Otto Meyer	Dirk Dautzenberg	Crime comedy	
Das schönste Fest der Welt	Thomas Fantl	Horst Tappert, Friedrich W. Bauschulte, Ulrich Matschoss	Drama	
Schrott	Eberhard Itzenplitz	Wolfried Lier	Drama	
Serjeant Musgrave's Dance	Fritz Umgelter	Rolf Boysen	Drama	a.k.a. Der Tanz des Sergeanten Musgrave
Sir Basil Zaharoff – Makler des Todes	Wolfgang Schleif	Richard Münch, Antje Weisgerber, Karl Michael Vogler, Heinz Weiss, Siegfried Wischnewski	Biography, History	a.k.a. Sir Basil Zaharoff: Merchant of Death
A Song at Twilight	Kurt Wilhelm	Paul Verhoeven, Hilde Krahl, Angela Salloker	Drama	a.k.a. Duett im Zwielicht
The Spanish Civil War	Rudolph Cartier	Wolfram Schaerf, Karl John	Docudrama, War	
Spaßmacher	Karl Fruchtmann	Stefan Wigger, Hans Korte, Rosemarie Fendel	Drama	a.k.a. Spassmacher
Spion unter der Haube	Günter Gräwert	Götz George, Loni von Friedl, Martin Held, Paul Dahlke, Sieghardt Rupp, Werner Peters, Rudolf Schündler, Herbert Fux	Thriller	
Spuk im Morgengrauen	Dieter Munck	Günther Neutze, Rosl Schäfer	Thriller	a.k.a. Dig Here
Storm in a Water Glass	Theodor Grädler	Therese Giehse, Grit Boettcher, Rolf Boysen, Chariklia Baxevanos	Comedy	
Strange Interlude	Oswald Döpke	Elfriede Irrall, Herbert Fleischmann, Günter Strack, Horst Tappert, Edith Schultze-Westrum, Rudolf Schündler	Drama	
Take My Life	Michael Braun	Monika Peitsch	Crime	a.k.a. Mord nach der Oper
The Tale of the 1002nd Night	Peter Beauvais	Johanna Matz, Dietmar Schönherr, Walther Reyer, Hans Jaray, Osman Ragheb, Helmut Qualtinger, Walter Kohut, Guido Wieland	Drama	a.k.a. The String Of Pearls
Die Tauben	Gerd Oelschlegel	Hansjoachim Krietsch, Karin Anselm, Herbert Steinmetz	Drama	
Thanatos Palace Hotel	Tom Toelle	Peter Pasetti, Hans Korte, Luitgard Im, Gert Westphal	Drama	a.k.a. Palace-Hotel
Those Without Shadows	Wilm ten Haaf	Hannelore Elsner, Christine Wodetzky, Carl Lange, Jürgen Draeger, Günther Schramm	Drama	a.k.a. In einem Monat, in einem Jahr
Torquato Tasso	Imo Moszkowicz	Michael Degen, Pinkas Braun, Elisabeth Schwarz, Renate Schroeter	Drama	
Tot im Kanapu	Rainer Wolffhardt	Paul Dahlke, Gert Haucke	Drama, War	a.k.a. Tot in Kanapu a.k.a. Tod in Kanapu
Transplantation	Rolf Busch	O. W. Fischer, Horst Tappert, Christine Wodetzky	Drama	
Traumnovelle	Wolfgang Glück	Karlheinz Böhm, Erika Pluhar	Drama	Austrian-West German co-production
The Trial Begins	Dieter Lemmel	Walter Jokisch, Ivar Combrinck, Susanne Beck, Hans Helmut Dickow, Alexander Hegarth	Drama	a.k.a. Der Prozeß beginnt a.k.a. Der Prozess beginnt
Umschulung	Claus Peter Witt	Hans Helmut Dickow, Tana Schanzara, Hildegard Krekel, Dirk Dautzenberg	Drama	
Undine	Herbert Junkers	Lucia Popp, Hermann Prey, Horst Hoffmann, Ruth-Margret Pütz	Opera	
Die ungarische Hochzeit	Kurt Wilhelm	Maria Schell, Mária Tiboldi, Peter Minich, Ljuba Welitsch, Kurt Großkurth, Ferry Gruber, Monika Dahlberg	Musical	a.k.a. The Hungarian Wedding. Austrian-West German co-production
Van Gogh	Thomas Fantl	Herbert Fleischmann, Friedrich G. Beckhaus, Gisela Hahn	Biography	
Vanillikipferln	Wolfgang Liebeneiner	Käthe Gold, Rudolf Forster, Hans Putz, Hilde Krahl	Anthology	a.k.a. Vanillikipferln; Abend zu dritt; Donau so blau
Verraten und verkauft	Franz Peter Wirth	Giulio Bosetti, Denis Manuel, Christine Wodetzky	Crime	a.k.a. Cool Sleeps Balaban
Verratener Widerstand	Rudolf Jugert	Heinz Weiss	Docudrama, War	a.k.a. Verratener Widerstand – Das Funkspiel der deutschen Abwehr in Holland
Der Versager	Eberhard Fechner	Horst Bollmann, Günter Strack, Helga Feddersen	Drama	
Die Verschwörung	Franz Josef Wild	Hannes Messemer, Heinz Baumann, Eva Kotthaus	Drama	
Die Verspätung	Erich Neureuther	Walter Bluhm, Fritz Rasp, Irmgard Först	Comedy	
Der vierte Platz	Joachim Hess	Eva Kotthaus	Drama	a.k.a. Der vierte Platz – Chronik einer westpreußischen Familie a.k.a. Der 4. Platz
A Village Without Men	Michael Kehlmann	Heidelinde Weis, Peter Weck, Rolf Boysen, Eric Pohlmann	Comedy	West German-Austrian co-production
Vorortzug	Oswald Döpke	Alexander May, Bruni Löbel, Giulia Follina	Drama	
Was kam denn da ins Haus?	Gerhard Klingenberg	Sebastian Fischer, Angelika Welzl, Susi Nicoletti, Erik Frey	Comedy	Austrian-West German-Swiss co-production
Waterloo	Jiří Weiss	Nadja Tiller, Ernst Schröder, Heinz Giese, Günter Mack, Friedrich W. Bauschulte	Drama	
Weh' dem, der erbt	Georg Tressler	Inge Meysel	Comedy	a.k.a. Mrs. Thursday
Das weite Land	Peter Beauvais	O. W. Fischer, Ruth Leuwerik, Sabine Sinjen, André Heller, Helmut Qualtinger	Drama	a.k.a. The Distant Land a.k.a. Far and Wide a.k.a. Undiscovered Country. West German-Austrian co-production
Where the Buffalo Roam	Heinz Schirk	Lutz Mackensy	Drama, Thriller	a.k.a. Die Ballade vom Cowboy
Whisper into My Good Ear	Wolfgang Spier	Rudolf Platte, Günther Lüders	Drama	a.k.a. Komm, flüstere in mein gutes Ohr
Wie ein Wunder kam die Liebe	Thomas Engel	Inge Brück, Erik Schumann, Stefan Behrens, Lukas Ammann	Musical	
A Woman of No Importance	Georg Wildhagen	Doris Kunstmann, Doris Schade, Erik Schumann	Comedy	a.k.a. Eine Frau ohne Bedeutung
Das Wunder von Lengede	Rudolf Jugert	Karl-Heinz von Hassel, Rolf Schimpf	Docudrama	
Die Zimmerschlacht	Franz Peter Wirth	Martin Benrath, Gisela Uhlen	Drama	
Der zweite Schuß	Erich Neureuther	Hans Caninenberg, Christine Wodetzky, Werner Kreindl	Crime	a.k.a. Der zweite Schuss

== See also ==
- List of Austrian films of 1969
- List of East German films of 1969

== Bibliography ==
- Bergfelder, Tim. International Adventures: German Popular Cinema and European Co-Productions in the 1960s. Berghahn Books, 2005.
