= Wolfgang Treu (cinematographer) =

German cinematographer (1930–2018)

- Born: 12 April 1930; Hamburg, Germany
- Died: 1 January 2018
- Occupation: Cinematographer

Wolfgang Treu (12 April 1930 in Hamburg – 1 January 2018) was a German cinematographer.

== Filmography ==
Film

- 1964: Hütet eure Töchter!
- 1966: 4 Schlüssel
- 1967: Next Year, Same Time
- 1968: The Castle
- 1969: Giselle
- 1971: The Salzburg Connection
- 1971: Trotta
- 1971: Jürgen Roland’s St. Pauli-Report
- 1973: The Pedestrian
- 1973: Merry-Go-Round
- 1973: The Flying Classroom
- 1974: When Mother Went on Strike
- 1976: Albino
- 1976: North Sea Is Dead Sea
- 1977: Disorder and Early Torment
- 1978: Moritz, Dear Moritz
- 1979: The Wonderful Years
- 1984: The Little Drummer Girl
- 1984: Forbidden
- 1984: Die zwei Gesichter des Januar
- 1985: Maschenka
- 1988: Quicker Than the Eye
- 1989: Seven Minutes
- 1990: Lippels Traum
- 1991: Becoming Colette
- 1992: Herr Ober!
- 1992: Otto – Der Liebesfilm
- 2002: Everyman's Feast

Television

- 1962: Die achte Runde
- 1962: Das ozeanische Fest
- 1962–1964: Hafenpolizei (television series)
- 1963: Der Tod wählt seine Nummer
- 1963: Die Rache des Jebal Deeks
- 1964: Der Prozeß Carl von O.
- 1964: Hotel Iphigenie
- 1965: Eine reine Haut
- 1965: Die Katze im Sack
- 1966: Irrungen – Wirrungen
- 1966: O süße Geborgenheit
- 1966: Jan Himp und die kleine Brise
- 1966: Corinne und der Seebär
- 1966: S.O.S. – Morro Castle
- 1966: Gesellschaftsspiel
- 1967: Hochspannung
- 1967: Der Mann aus dem Bootshaus
- 1967: Play Bach
- 1967: Verbotenes Spiel
- 1967: Jetzt schlägt’s 13
- 1968: Don Kosaken
- 1968: Duo
- 1968: Solo für einen Dirigenten
- 1969: Kapitän Harmsen (television series)
- 1969: Die Ballade vom Cowboy
- 1969: Lieber Erwin
- 1969: Weh' dem, der erbt
- 1970: Maximilian von Mexiko
- 1970: Die Journalistin (television series)
- 1970: Der Polizeimeister – Joseph Fouché
- 1970: Hanna Lessing
- 1971: Seine Majestät Gustav Krause
- 1971: Das Herz aller Dinge
- 1972: Sonderdezernat K1: Vier Schüsse auf den Mörder
- 1972: Eine Frau bleibt eine Frau. Zehn Geschichten mit Lilli Palmer
- 1972: Sonderdezernat K1: Vorsicht – Schutzengel!
- 1972: Sonderdezernat K1: Mord im Dreivierteltakt
- 1972: Die Fledermaus
- 1973: Im Reservat
- 1973: Die Gräfin von Rathenow
- 1973: Eine Frau bleibt eine Frau. Neue Geschichten mit Lilli Palmer
- 1973: Der zerbrochne Krug
- 1974: Salome
- 1974: Comenius
- 1974: Madame Butterfly
- 1975: Lokalseite unten links (television series)
- 1975: Die Verschwörung des Fiesco zu Genua
- 1975: Der Kommissar: "Der Mord an Dr. Winter"
- 1975: Der Biberpelz
- 1976: Eine Frau bleibt eine Frau. Drei Geschichten mit Lilli Palmer
- 1976: Young Dr. Freud
- 1976: Sucht mich nicht, macht weiter
- 1977: Auf der Suche nach dem Glück
- 1977: Seltsam sind des Glückes Launen
- 1977: Der Tod des Camillo Torres oder Die Wirklichkeit hält viel aus
- 1977: Arabella
- 1978: Jugend, Liebe und die Wacht am Rhein
- 1978: L’Orfeo
- 1978: Ariadne auf Naxos
- 1978: Erzählung eines Unbekannten
- 1978–1982: Kümo Henriette (television series)
- 1979: Die Krönung der Poppea
- 1979: Falstaff
- 1979: Egon Schiele
- 1979: Die Heimkehr des Odysseus
- 1981: Achtung Zoll (television series)
- 1981: Hänsel und Gretel
- 1981: Die Wildente
- 1981: Ein Fall für zwei: "Die große Schwester"
- 1982: Wir haben uns doch mal geliebt
- 1982: God Does Not Believe in Us Anymore
- 1982: Egmont
- 1982: The Oppermanns
- 1982: Dort an der Grenze: Kärnten 1966–1976
- 1983: Zwei Tote im Sender und Don Carlos im PoGl
- 1983: Die Kameraden des Koloman Wallisch
- 1983: So ein Theater
- 1984: The Devil's Lieutenant
- 1984: Storm – Der Schimmelreiter
- 1985: A Crime of Honour
- 1985: Das Diarium des Dr. Döblinger
- 1986: Tatort: Leiche im Keller
- 1986: Die Kolonie
- 1986: Anna und Franz. Eine Liebe in Europa
- 1988: Hemingway (miniseries)
- 1988: Cosi fan tutte
- 1989: Moffengriet – Liebe tut, was sie will
- 1990: Embezzled Heaven
- 1991: Tote leben länger
- 1993: Madame Bäurin
- 1993: Der rote Vogel (miniseries)
- 1994: Die Männer vom K3: Ende eines Schürzenjägers
- 1994: Kein Platz für Idioten
- 1994: Das Traumschiff – Dubai
- 1994: Das Traumschiff – Mauritius
- 1995: Gabriellas Rache
- 1996: Der Mann ohne Schatten: Das Monster
- 1996: Der Mann ohne Schatten: Der Mörder unseres Vaters
- 1996: Diebinnen
- 1997: Freunde
- 1997: Der kleine Dachschaden
- 1997: Die Männer vom K 3: Zu viele Verdächtige
- 1998: Einmal leben
- 1998: Ein Mann stürzt ab
- 2001: Zum Glück verrückt – Eine unschlagbare Familie

== Awards ==
- 1968: Filmband in Gold (camera) for Das Schloß
- 1977: Premio Aladroque a la Mejor Fotografia Cartagena für North Sea Is Dead Sea
- 1984: Nomination for the German Camera Awards
- 1988: ASC Award: Nomination Finalist (Outstanding Achievement in Cinematography) for Hemingway
- 1990: Nomination for the German Camera Awards
- 1994: Nomination for the German Camera Awards
