= The Blood of the Walsungs =

Novella by Thomas Mann

The Blood of the Walsungs (Wälsungenblut in German) is a novella written by the German author Thomas Mann. Originally written in 1905 and set to be published in the January 1906 issue of Die Neue Rundschau, it was pulled from print because of its similarities to Mann's new wife and her family. The story was finally published in Germany in 1921 and has since remained one of Mann's most controversial works for its portrayal of anti-Semitism and incest.

The novella narrates an episode in the lives of the Aarenhold household and its youngest members, the twins Siegmund and Sieglinde, who spend most of their time together and love each other deeply to the point of committing incest. Mann drew artistic inspiration from Richard Wagner's 1870 opera Die Walküre (The Valkyrie) and the myth the Völsunga clan, famous in Nordic mythology.

The Blood of the Walsungs (1989 Vintage International Edition)
Author	Thomas Mann
Translator	Helen Tracey Lowe-Porter
Country	Germany
Language	German
Genre	Fiction, novella
Published	March 1989 (US)
Publisher	Random House, Inc. (US)

== Plot ==
Herr Aarenhold is a wealthy entrepreneur of Jewish origin. Born in small town in East Prussia, Herr Aarenhold becomes wealthy after engaging in large-scale mining schemes. He marries Frau Aarenhold, the daughter of a German tradesman, and becomes assimilated into German culture. All of Herr Aarenhold's adult children still live in the house while they pursue their professional careers. Kunz, the eldest son, is an active member of the military. Märit, the eldest daughter, possesses a strong character and studies law. The youngest members of the Aarenhold household are the twins, Siegmund and Sieglinde, named after the characters in Richard Wagner's Die Walküre. They are spoiled members of bourgeois society and love each other strongly; to the point of almost never seeing one without the other hand in hand.

One day at lunchtime, the Aarenholds sit around their mansion waiting for Beckerath – a government official who is soon to become Sieglinde's husband. Beckerath arrives late to the event and his tardiness is not very well-received by Herr Aarenhold and Sieglinde. During the course of the meal, Herr Aarenhold tells Beckerath of his origins and how he believes in absolute achievement. That no matter the conditions you have to endure, true achievement is defined by whether you overcome the obstacles presented to you and reach your goals without excuses. Contrary to the aestheticism and grandiose eloquence to which the Aarenholds ascribe, Beckerath is only an amateur in the arts and finds it hard to keep up the pace with their conversation. Beckerath's dullness renders him the target of the Aarenhold children's rhetorical attacks. Giving Beckerath a break, Siegmund asks for his permission to allow Siegmund and Sieglinde to attend the opera alone together one last time before her marriage. Moved by such request, Beckerath agrees to the request, and the twins are set to see Die Walküre that evening. It turns out that Siegmund is expecting the official to agree to his request since he had bought the tickets with long anticipation.

After the lunch is over, Siegmund starts getting ready for the function. He constantly shaves his facial hair and pampers himself with toilet waters as a way to purify himself from his Jewish origins. Already dressed and warning him of the carriage's arrival, Sieglinde joins her twin brother in his room and, in that private atmosphere, they share some caresses and a kiss. In company of their servant, Wendelin, the twins leave the mansion amid light snow. They shut themselves in the warmth of the carriage and find comfort in each other. Once they arrive at the opera, Siegmund and Sieglinde make themselves comfortable in their box and watch the characters whom they are named after. They see their image, fate, and experience reflected in the children of the Nordic gods. The twins, especially Siegmund, become exalted with the musical rendition of their operatic counterparts. So much so that, during the intermissions, they walk through the theater corridors in a trance-like state, indifferent of their surroundings.

The twins return to an empty house after the function, since the rest of the family is out on personal business. One of the house servants, Florian, awaits them at the dinner table with fruit, caviar sandwiches, and red wine. Siegmund dismisses Florian and lights a cigarette. In the meantime, Sieglinde brews some tea and adds some burgundy to it. Their time at the dinner table is taciturn and, after Sieglinde's insistence that he should eat something, Siegmund leaves the room in an uncustomary rude manner. He retreats to his bedroom and is convinced that, soon, Sieglinde will come to his room to say good night in the way that they are both used to. In his room, Siegmund looks for what to do next. He changes his clothes, lights another cigarette, and analyzes his features in front of a mirror. He finally decides to lie on a bearskin rug in his room – similar to the one mentioned in Wagner's opera. Sieglinde finally shows at his door and is initially scared that Siegmund is sick when she sees him on the bearskin on the floor. She rushes to his side and is relieved to see he is fine. She is already in her night garments and as she kneels over Siegmund, he sees her breasts under the lace. Sieglinde starts to stroke her brother's hair, giving way to kisses, caresses, and a passion that takes the upper hand. After they consummate their incestuous relationship, Sieglinde asks what will happen to Beckerath, to which Siegmund replies that he should be thankful to them now that they made his life more exciting.

== Characters ==
- Herr Aarenhold is the patriarch of the Aarenhold household. He was born in a small village in East Prussia to a family of Jewish origin. After his participation in large-scale mining schemes, he amasses a great fortune and marries the daughter of a German tradesman. He mentions that the key to enjoy the comforts and pleasures of life is to never get used to them.
- Frau Aarenhold is the wife of Herr Aarenhold. She is the daughter of wealthy German tradesman. She is described as an unattractive woman who styles her hair in a fashion that both her husband and children dislike. She is a passive figure and does not contribute much to conversations besides a few pointless questions.
- Kunz Aarenhold is the eldest son of the Aarenhold family. He is an eloquent man who has committed his professional career to the military.
- Märit Aarenhold is the eldest daughter of the Aarenhold household. She is twenty-eight years old and a law student. Her appearance is described as pale and austere. She is of strong character, eloquent, and goes through life by her own rules.
- Sieglinde Aarenhold is the youngest daughter of the family and a twin sister to Siegmund. She is named after the characters in one of Wagner's operas. At nineteen-years old, she becomes engaged to a government official named Beckerath. She is described as spoiled member of bourgeois society who engages in an incestuous relationship with her twin brother.
- Siegmund Aarenhold is the youngest son of the family and a twin brother to Sieglinde. He is nineteen-years old and an avid consumer of the arts. He enjoys reading and tried painting for a while. He quits painting lessons after realizing that his abilities are not up artistic standards and that most students in the class do not bathe often. He displays internalized hate for his Jewish origin and constantly shaves and bathes in toilet water to erase the signs of his heritage. He engages in an incestuous relationship with his twin sister.
- Beckerath is a government official and the soon-to-be husband of Sieglinde. He comes from a good family, but is not as instructed in the arts as the Aarenhold family. His dull character makes him an easy target for the Aarenhold intricate rhetorical attacks.
- Wendelin and Florian are servants to the Aarenhold family.

== Background ==
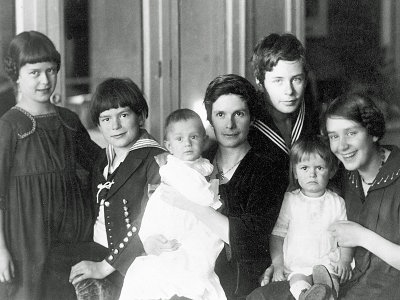
Katja Mann (née Pringsheim) with her six children around 1919.

At the center of Thomas Mann's novella lies the incestuous relationship between the twins Siegmund and Sieglinde Aarenhold, named after the ill-fated siblings of Wagner's Die Walküre. Although Mann never discussed explicitly his inspiration for writing The Blood of the Walsungs, it is believed that he based the story on his wife Katja Pringsheim and her twin brother Klaus Pringsheim. In 1905, Mann married Katja, the daughter of Alfred Pringsheim, who was the chair of the mathematics department at the University of Munich (LMU Munich) during the time. Katja and Klaus always had a close relationship and were often seen on the streets of Munich holding each other's hands. The extent of their love was never revealed, but it did cause a lot of public gossip and personal distress on the Pringsheim family. After being married to Katja for a few months, Mann wrote the novella in 1905 and arranged to publish it in the January 1906 issue of Die Neue Rundschau. The upper-class Jewish family that Mann writes about resembles the Pringsheim family to a great extent. Upon discovering the incestuous nature of the story, Katja's father demanded Mann to pull the story from print, which Mann did. The story was suppressed for another fifteen years until finally appearing in book form in 1921.

== Adaptations ==
Thomas Mann's novella, The Blood of the Walsungs, was adapted into the German drama film Wälsungenblut, directed by Rolf Thiele. The film stars Michael Maien as Siegmund Arnstatt, Elena Nathanael as Sieglinde Arnstatt, Gerd Baltus as Lieutenant Backerath, and Rudolf Forster as Count Arnstatt. In 1964, Michael Maien won the Best Young Actor award at the Bambi Awards for his role in the film. The film was entered into the 15th Berlin International Film Festival where it was nominated for the Golden Berlin Bear. At the 1965 German Film Awards, the movie won three awards: Best Production Design, Rudolf Forster for Best Performance by an Actor in a Supporting Role, and Gerd Baltus for Best Performance by a Young Actor.
