= Eye in the Labyrinth =

1972 film

- Directed by: Mario Caiano
- Screenplay by: Mario Caiano; Antonio Saguera; Horst Hächler
- Story by: Mario Caiano; Antonio Saguera
- Starring: Rosemarie Dexter; Horst Frank; Adolfo Celi; Alida Valli
- Cinematography: Giovanni Ciarlo
- Edited by: Jolanda Benvenuti
- Music by: Roberto Nicolosi
- Production companies: Transeuropa Film; TV 13, München
- Distributed by: Cineriz
- Release date: 24 March 1972 (West Germany)
- Countries: Italy; West Germany

Eye in the Labyrinth (Italian: L'occhio nel labirinto) is a 1972 giallo film directed by Mario Caiano and starring Rosemary Dexter, Sybil Danning, Alida Valli and Adolfo Celi.

== Plot ==
Julie (Rosemary Dexter) is disturbed by the disappearance of her psychiatrist boyfriend Luca (Horst Frank) following a bizarre dream where she witnessed him murdered. She travels to a seaside village where he might be and encounters Frank (Adolfo Celi), who tells her Luca has indeed been there. Julie's investigation leads her to the house of Gerta (Alida Valli), where the mystery deepens among the odd characters residing at this artists' enclave.

== Cast ==
- Rosemary Dexter as Julie
- Adolfo Celi as Frank
- Alida Valli as Gerda
- Horst Frank as Luca
- Sybil Danning as Toni
- Franco Ressel as Eugene
- Michael Maien as Louis
- Benjamin Lev as Saro
- Gigi Rizzi as Thomas
- Peter Kranz
- Gaetano Donati
- Elisa Mainardi as Orphanage Director

== Release ==
Eye in the Labyrinth was released on 24 March 1972 in West Germany.
