= Marianne Wellershoff =

German journalist and author

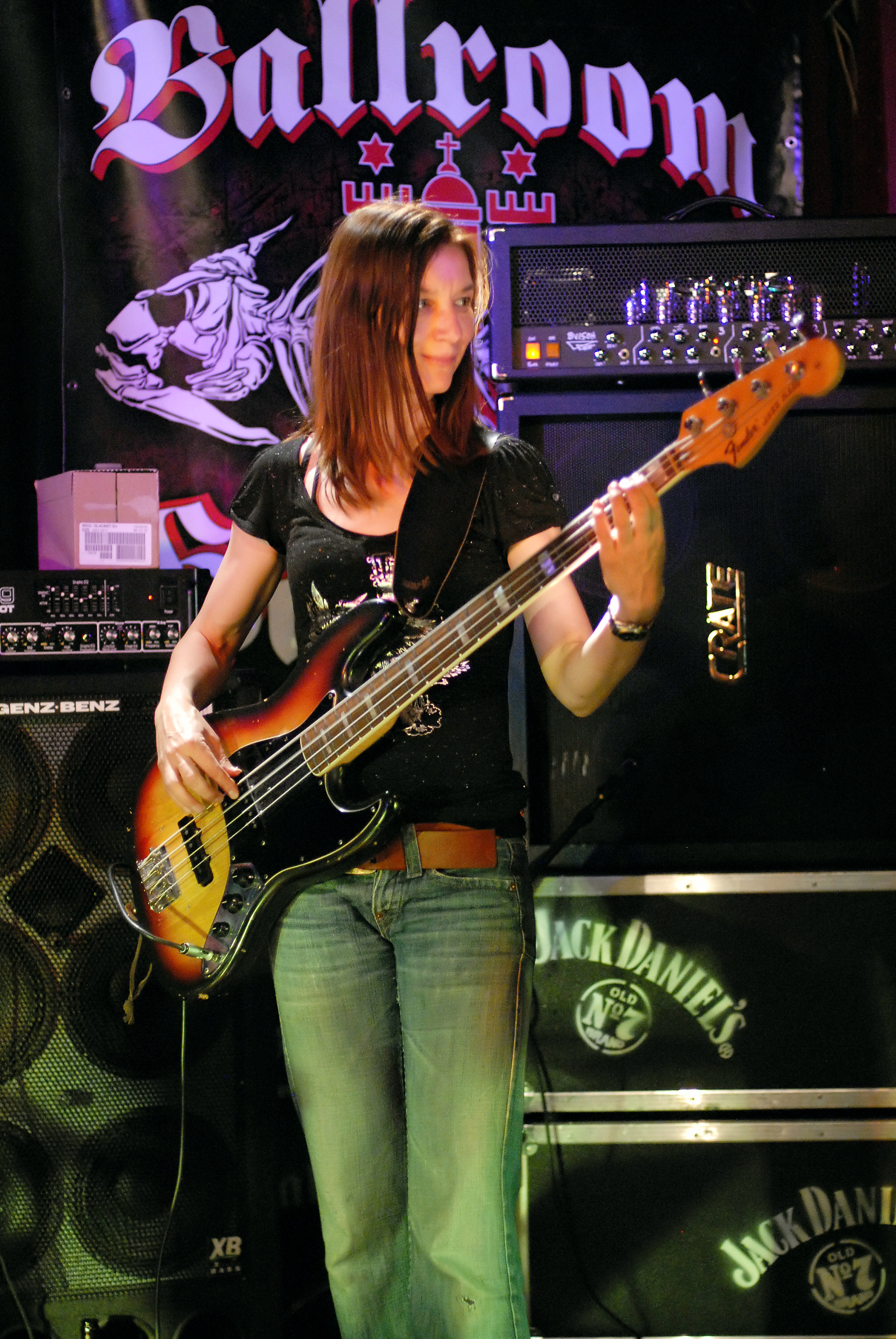
Wellershoff in 2008

Marianne Wellershoff (born 1963) is a German journalist, author and musician.

== Life ==
Wellershoff is the daughter of the writer Dieter Wellershoff (1925–2018) and the writer Maria Wellershoff, née von Thadden. She is married to the actor Martin May and has two daughters. She lives in Hamburg.

== Work ==
Wellershoff studied psychology. From 2002 to 2015, she was head of the editorial department of Kulturspiegel, the now discontinued culture supplement of the news magazine Der Spiegel. Since then, she has worked as an author for the news magazine and other publications of Spiegel. For example, from October 2016 to October 2017, she wrote a long-term observation of the inner workings of a Hamburg reception center entitled Flüchtlingsheim am Grenzweg as a weekly blog for Spiegel Online and wrote the booklets Richtig essen (2017) and Endlich fit (2018) for Spiegel Wissen. Wellershoff has published several books that focus on the role and emotional world of the thirtysomething generation, including the critically acclaimed short story collection Nah dran, a collection about love in the jungle of the young urban bourgeoisie.

Wellershoff was elected to the management board of Mitarbeiter KG des Spiegel-Verlags in March 2007 and confirmed in office in March 2010 and February 2013. Her third term of office ended in March 2016.

Wellershoff is a bassist and lyricist with the Hamburg band Hansagold, before that she was a member of the Kitchen Cowboys.

== Works ==
- Die widerspenstigen Töchter – Für eine neue Frauenbewegung. Kiepenheuer & Witsch 1999 (with Susanne Weingarten).
- Männerträume. Steidl 2002 (with Torsten Kollmer).
- Nah dran. Steidl 2004.
- as ed.: Mit 17 hat man noch Träume. dtv 2006.
- Männerträume. Audiobook, read by Martin May, Netmusiczo 2006.
- Spiegel Wissen: Eating really well. Hamburg 2017
- Spiegel Wissen: Fit at last. Hamburg 2018
- Flüchtlingsheim am Grenzweg – Ein Jahr in einer Erstaufnahme. Spiegel 2018
- as ed.: Ich komm weiter im Job: Stärken erkennen, Blockaden lösen, Veränderungen meistern. Penguin Verlag, Munich 2022, ISBN 978-3-328-10882-5.
