= Zaborowo, Ełk County =

Zaborowo
- Village
- Location within Poland
- Coordinates: 53°52′N 22°35′E
- Country: Poland
- Voivodeship: Warmian-Masurian
- County: Ełk
- Gmina: Kalinowo

Zaborowo ([zabɔˈrɔvɔ]; German: Saborowen, 1938–45 Reichenwalde) is a village in the administrative district of Gmina Kalinowo, within Ełk County, Warmian-Masurian Voivodeship, in northern Poland.

== Notable residents ==
- Siegfried Wischnewski (1922–1989), German actor
