= Christine Wodetzky =

German actress

- Born: 5 January 1938; Leipzig, Germany
- Died: 6 December 2004 (aged 66); Berlin, Germany
- Occupation(s): Film actor Television actor
- Years active: 1966–2002

Christine Wodetzky (1938-2004) was a German film and television actress.

== Partial filmography ==
- Ha-Dybbuk (1968) as Lea
- The Odessa File (1974) as Gisela
- To the Bitter End (1975) as Natascha Petrowna
- The Wonderful Years (1979) as Frau Bergmann
- Haus im Süden (1984) as Cecile

=== Television appearances ===
- Heinrich VIII. und seine Frauen (1968, TV Movie) as Anne Boleyn
- Those Without Shadows (1969, TV Movie) as Josée de Saint-Cyr
- Verraten und verkauft (1969, TV Movie) as Caroline
- Maximilian von Mexiko (1970, TV Movie) as Carlota of Mexico
- Der Kommissar (1971–1975, 2 episodes) as Charlotte Lenhard / Celia Alberti
- Marya Sklodowska-Curie (1972, TV Movie) as Marie Curie
- Zündschnüre (1974, TV Movie) as Gertrude Rosenkranz
- Les Faucheurs de marguerites (1974) as Jeanne Dabert
- Sonderdezernat K1 (1974–1977, 2 episodes) as Inga Jensen / Heidi Schelkopf
- Derrick (1976–1993, 7 episodes) as Marie Scholz / Frau Wiesner / Frau Renzi / Frau Korda / Hanna Windorf / Elsa Hassler / Helga Hoffmann
- The Old Fox (1977–1998, 13 episodes) as Irene Gutbrod / Sonja Brandel / Regina Marbes / Waltraud Hanisch / Karin Simon / Franziska Bublin / Käte Gerstner / Franziska Kilian / Elvira Berden / Gertrud Brück / Dorothea / Vera Mathiesen / Hanni Peukert
- Ein Mann namens Parvus (1984, TV Movie) as Ekaterina
- Ein Fall für zwei: Der Versager (1985, Episode: "Der Versager") as Claudia Hassler
- Tatort (1988, Episode: "Sein letzter Wille") as Frau Liebmeier
- Lorentz & Söhne (1988) as Elisabeth Lorentz
- Die Männer vom K3 (1988, Episode: "Schützenfest") as Else Hausdorf
- Rothenbaumchaussee (1991, TV Movie)
