= Tod eines Schülers =

- Created by: Robert Stromberger
- Country of origin: Germany
- No. of episodes: 6

Production
- Camera setup: Rudolf Körösi; Ursula Körösi

Tod eines Schülers (A student's death) is a German television series directed by Claus Peter Witt, based on a script by Robert Stromberger. The premiere took place in 1981 on the ZDF television channel.

The series is about the fictional suicide by train of student Claus Wagner. Each episode begins with Wagner's death, looking into the subject from different points of view.

== Cast ==
- Till Topf: Claus Wagner (main character)
- Günter Strack: Horst Wagner (Claus Wagner's father)
- Eva Zlonitzky: Yvonne Wagner (Claus Wagner's mother)
- Hans Helmut Dickow: Löschner (the investigating police inspector)
- Ute Christensen: Inge Reitz (Claus Wagner's girl-friend)

== Episodes ==
Episode	title (translated)	Original title	Television premiere
1	The missing motive	Das fehlende Motiv	18.01.1981
2	The parents	Die Eltern	25.01.1981
3	The teachers	Die Lehrer	01.02.1981
4	The fellow students	Die Mitschüler	08.02.1981
5	The girlfriend	Die Freundin	16.02.1981
6	Claus Wagner	Claus Wagner	22.02.1981

== Accolades ==
Goldene Kamera in 1981.

== Consequences ==
Even though the series received positive reviews, and is still considered a milestone in German television history, it was denounced by parents' associations. A major allegation was the possibility of inducing copycat suicides.

According to a study conducted by the Central Institute of Mental Health in Mannheim, during the 70 days following the first broadcast of “Tod eines Schülers”, the suicide rate among adolescents aged 15–19, using the same method depicted in the television series, increased by 175%.

Eighteen months later, after the series was rebroadcast, another sharp rise in suicides was recorded among the same age group, involving the same method—an increase of 115%.

Subsequently, ZDF commissioned two additional studies, which concluded that a connection between the television series and adolescent suicides could not be established. Nevertheless, the broadcaster refused to release the series for retail sale on home video for nearly 30 years. It was finally released on DVD on August 7, 2009.

== See also ==
- List of German television series
