= PS (TV series) =

- Starring: Gerd Baltus
- Country of origin: Germany

PS is a German television series.

== See also ==
- List of German television series
