= Peter Minich =

Austrian singer and opera singer

- Born: 29 January 1927; St. Pölten, Austria
- Died: 29 July 2013 (aged 86); Vienna, Austria
- Occupations: Actor; Operatic tenor
- Spouses: Eleonore Bauer; Guggi Löwinger

Peter Minich (29 January 1927 – 29 July 2013) was an Austrian stage actor who became a tenor performing in operas, operettas and musical films. He was for decades the lead tenor of the Volksoper in Vienna, focused on Viennese operetta.

== Life ==
=== Family and early years ===
Minich was born the son of an innkeeper in St Pölten. An early ambition to work in automobile design led him to attend the HTL Mödling, a technical college for mechanical engineering at Mödling, just outside Vienna. But it was not long before he discovered his love of theatre. He undertook training in acting during the post-war period, attending both the Max Reinhardt Seminar and the Franz Schubert Conservatory. The training included acting, stagecraft and singing. He then studied at the Vienna Music Academy. In 1948 he had his first professional engagement, performing in a Viennese cellar theatre.

=== Burgtheater, St. Pölten, Graz ===
As a trainee actor, Minich made stage appearances at Vienna's Burgtheater. In December 1950 he made his first guest appearance (in a small speaking role) at the Volksoper, taking the part of Lieutenant Guarini in Millöcker's Gasparone. Then between 1951 and 1953 he played at the Landestheater Niederösterreich (as it was known at that time) in St. Pölten. It was during his time at the St. Pölten "Stadttheater" that he was "discovered" as a singer by the influential opera critic Marcel Prawy, after stepping in for a sick colleague, on the day of Prawy's attendance, to take on the tenor role in Suppé's Boccaccio. He also made his official debut as a singer in St. Pölten, appearing in a bass role as Colonel Franz Ollendorf in Millöcker's Der Bettelstudent. During this period in St. Pölten he met "the first great love of his life", the operetta singer Eleonore Bauer (1927–1965), whom he subsequently married.

=== St. Gallen ===
Between 1951 and 1955, Minich's principal venue was the Theater St. Gallen (subsequently torn down, relocated and rebuilt: the 1950s theatre frontage has been replaced by a McDonald's burger outlet). He was then principally engaged at the Graz Opera between 1955 and 1960. Having already made his debut at the Volksoper in Vienna in a small speaking role back in 1950, and a number of noteworthy appearances there during the intervening decade, Minich in 1960 became a permanent member of the Volksoper company. Sources indicate that recommendations from Marcel Prawy were again instrumental in the appointment. It was at the Volksoper that Minich's stage career reached its high point during the 1960s and 1970s.

=== Volksoper ===
Minich starred in several guest roles at the Volksoper, notably in 1956 as Petruchio in Porter's Kiss Me, Kate and then in 1957 as Eisenstein in Die Fledermaus by Johann Strauss. In September 1960, he made his first stage appearance after joining as a full-time Volksoper ensemble member as Count Tassilo in Kálmán's Countess Maritza.

During nearly twenty years as a member of the Volksoper company, Minich took on many of the classic tenor light opera roles from the mainstream light opera repertoire. Among his many leading roles at the Staatsoper were Symon in Der Bettelstudent (1960), Lieutenant Niki in Ein Walzertraum by Oscar Straus (1960, and reprised in 1974), Danilo in Lehár's The Merry Widow (1960 and 1974) and Paul Aubier in Opernball by Richard Heuberger (1960 and 1985). It was a typical Viennese repertoire of light opera tenor roles which also included that of Achmed Bey in Fall's The Rose of Stamboul (1961), the title role in Boccaccio (1961), Carmello in Eine Nacht in Venedig by Johann Strauss (1961), Mister X in Die Zirkusprinzessin (1962), Nanki-Puh in The Mikado (1962), René in Madame Pompadour (1964), René in Der Graf von Luxemburg (1964), Edwin Ronald in Die Csárdásfürstin (1966), Adam in Zeller's Der Vogelhändler (1966), Count Zedlau in Wiener Blut (1967), the stranger in Venus in Seide, Anton Hofer in Zwei Herzen im Dreivierteltakt (1975) and Leopold in The White Horse Inn (1976).

A particular highlight of Minich's career came in 1964 when he sang alongside Mimi Coertse in the premiere at the Volksoper of Frühjahrsparade by Robert Stolz. Still at the Volksoper, in 1973 he took on the role of Jimmy Mahoney in Rise and Fall of the City of Mahagonny by Weill and Brecht. This was, and would remain, one of Minich's very few serious opera (as opposed to light opera) roles.

In 1962 and again in 1963 he took part in the Salzburg Festival, appearing in Mozart's Die Entführung aus dem Serail as the Pasha Bassa Selim (a speaking role). He came to the attention of a wider audience during this period through a succession of television productions involving, notably, major roles in a number of "operetta films". He reprised the part of Adam in a television version of Der Vogelhändler (1967), starring alongside Lucia Popp and Renate Holm.

By the 1980s he was no longer typically cast for young man roles. He nevertheless joined the Volksoper tours of the Soviet Union in 1982 and Japan in 1983 as a guest performer. Minich had always insisted that he was in the first instance an actor who had learned to sing, rather than a singer who had learned to act, and by this time he was concentrating on character roles and comic parts. Examples are Baron Gondremarck in Offenbach's La Vie parisienne (1981) and his 1983 return with the Volksoper company to the part of Colonel Franz Ollendorf in Der Bettelstudent. Other examples of this development in his professional repertoire included his appearance as Podestà Nasoni in Gasparone (1988), Triquet in Tchaikovsky's Eugene Onegin (1990) and "age-appropriate roles" as the old farmer Matthäus Scheichelreuther in The Merry Farmer (1997) and the aged emperor Franz Joseph in The White Horse Inn (1976).

=== Beyond the Volksoper ===
During the final years of his career, Minich increased the proportion of his work undertaken outside the Volksoper, while remaining in the Lower Austria region surrounding Vienna. His focus continued to be on operettas, but increasingly on speaking roles. In 1998 he appeared at the Stadttheater Baden in Baden bei Wien as Honoré Lachailles in Gigi. There were further appearances at the Langenlois Castle Festival, as Prince Ypsheim-Gindelbach in Wiener Blut (2000) and at the Sommerspiele Perchtoldsdorf as Donna in Il Campiello by Carlo Goldoni (2001). In 2005 he returned to the Stadttheater Baden, appearing in Frühjahrsparade by Robert Stolz, this time taking the part of the emperor.

In October 2006 he took on the role of Emperor Altoum in Puccini's Turandot, which turned out to be his final stage role with the Volksoper, and he continued to play the part in 2007. During the final months of 2007 and again during 2008/09, he reprised the role, but this time in a short series of concert performances rather than on the opera stage. His final major stage role came in 2007 when he appeared in a speaking role as old Pastor Cerny in Der Pfarrer von Kirchfeld by Ludwig Anzengruber. Guggi Löwinger was also a member of the cast. Although the role is written as an old man, there is nothing in the writers' stage directions about confining the character to a wheel-chair. Minich's wheel-chair bound performance generated tears in the audience.

Minich's last public appearance came in December 2009 in the context of the Volksoper Christmas concert.

=== Death ===
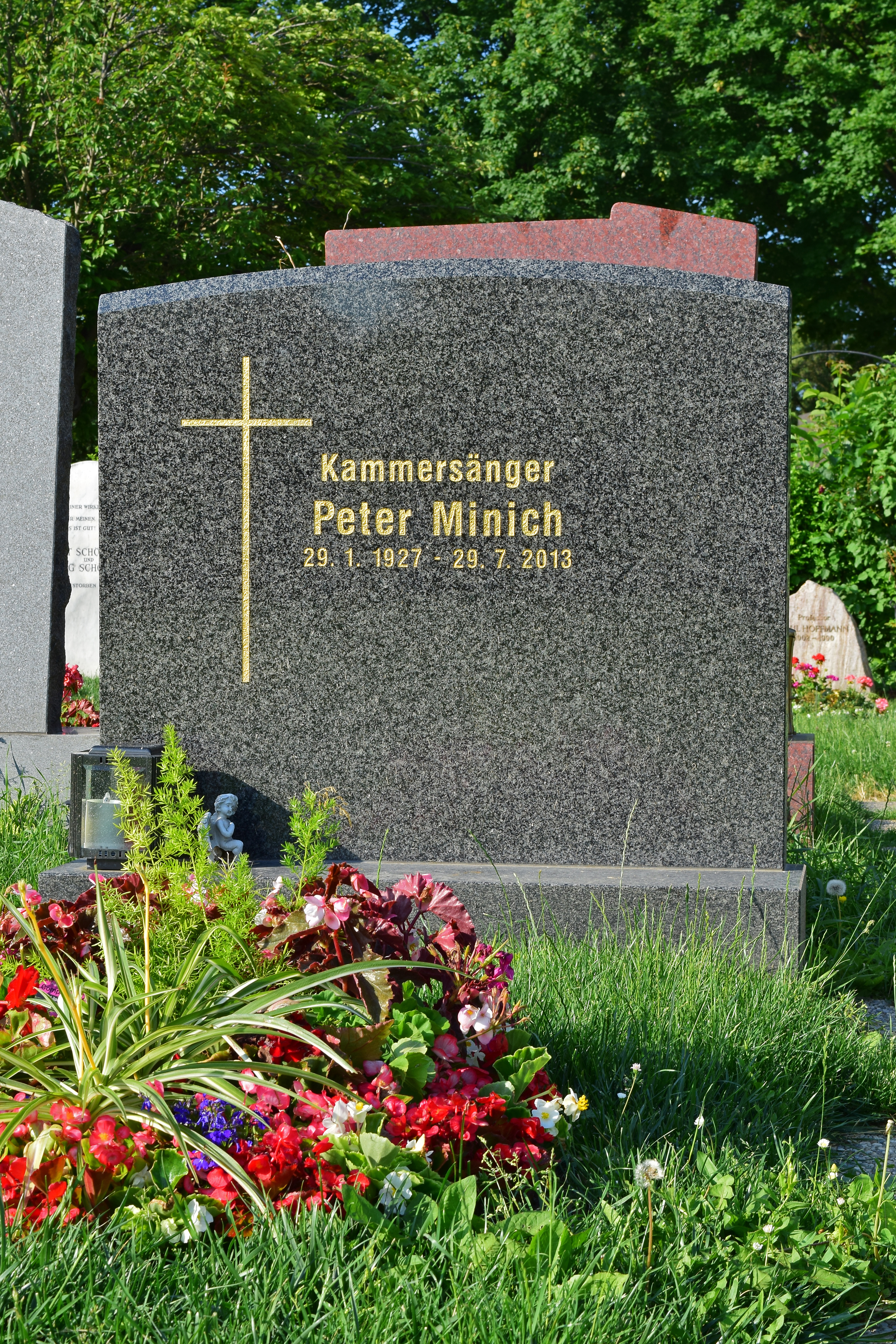
Peter Minich's first grave at the Vienna Central Cemetery

In January 2005, Minich was diagnosed with early-stage Parkinson's disease. It progressed rapidly. He was 86 when he died in Vienna of pneumonia.

== Literature ==
- Karl-Josef Kutsch, Leo Riemens: Großes Sängerlexikon. Fourth, extended and updated edition. Volume 5 Menni - Rappold. K. G. Saur, Munich 2003, ISBN 3-598-11598-9 (7 volumes)
