= Ein Heim für Tiere =

1985-1992 German television series

- Starring: Siegfried Wischnewski
- Country of origin: Germany

Original release
- Network: ZDF

Ein Heim für Tiere (English: A Home for Animals) is a German television series that ran from 1985 to 1992, starring Siegfried Wischnewski, Marion Kracht, and Michael Lesch. It was first on the air January 23, 1985, and the last episode aired March 19, 1992. Eight seasons of the show were made.

The series is about a veterinarian living on a farm in the fictional town Adelsheim, where the main characters care for animals.

== See also ==
- List of German television series
