= Katharina Matz =

German actress (1935–2021)

- Born: 11 June 1935; Haindorf, Sudetenland, Czechoslovakia
- Died: 3 March 2021 (aged 85); Berlin, Berlin, Germany
- Occupation: Film actor
- Years active: 1954–2020

Katharina Matz (11 June 1935 – 3 March 2021) was a Czech-born German film and television actress.

== Selected filmography ==
- The Man Who Sold Himself (1959)
- As You Like It (1970)
- The Wonderful Years (1979)
- Fifty-Fifty (1988)

=== Television appearances ===
- Maximilian von Mexiko (1970)
- The Old Fox: Tödlicher Bumerang (1985)
- The Old Fox: Der sanfte Tod (1987)
- Rosamunde Pilcher: Das Ende eines Sommers (1995)
- Notruf Hafenkante: Herz an Herz (2008)
