= Lean Times =

- Genre: Drama
- Directed by: Michael Braun
- Starring: Karin Anselm; Gerd Baltus; Margot Leonard; Ilse Pagé
- Country of origin: West Germany
- Original language: German
- No. of series: 1
- No. of episodes: 16

Production
- Running time: 25 minutes
- Production company: Norddeutscher Rundfunk

Original release
- Network: ARD
- Release: 4 October 1978 – 31 January 1979

Lean Times (German: Magere Zeiten) is a West German television series which originally aired on ARD in 1978.

== Selected cast ==
- Karin Anselm as Bettina Basdorf
- Margot Leonard as Hanna Hergenrath
- Wolfgang Völz as Atze Müller
- Christian Hanft as Sigbert Hergenrath
- Wieslawa Wesolowska as Hildegard Hergenrath
- Gerd Baltus as Dr. Peter Helfrich
- Ilse Pagé as Conny Finkbein
- Günter Strack as Alfred Mildezahn
- Johannes Grossmann as Walter Burger
- Walter Buschhoff as Fritz Kohlwitz

== Bibliography ==
- Jovan Evermann. Der Serien-Guide: M-S. Schwarzkopf & Schwarzkopf, 1999.
