= Dietrich Mattausch =

German actor (born 1940)

- Born: 26 April 1940 (age 86); Leitmeritz; Sudetenland
- Occupations: Film actor Television actor
- Years active: 1970 -

Dietrich Mattausch is a German stage, film and television actor.

== Life and career ==
Dietrich Mattausch was born on April 26, 1940, in Leitmeritz, Sudetenland (now Litoměřice, Czech Republic). He is a stage, film and television actor best known for Der Fahnder (1984), Die Straßen von Berlin (1995), and The Wonderful Years (1979).

As a young adult, Mattausch trained as a forwarding agent and simultaneously took private acting lessons. He began his acting career at the Keller Theater in Mainz.

In 1963 he played at Göttingen Youth Theatre, 1964–66 at the Comedy in Frankfurt am Main, 1966–67 at Landestheater Schleswig, 1968–69 at Landestheater Detmold, 1969 at the Bruchsal State Theatre, 1969–70 at Theater Baden-Baden, 1971 on the stages of Lübeck, and from 1972 to 1974 at the Deutsches Theater Göttingen.

From 1975 to 1979 he was at the Schauspielhaus Hamburg where, directed by Peter Zadek, he played the role of Rodrigo in Othello (1976), Camillo in The Winter's Tale (1978), Brinan in the German premiere of Ayckbourn's Jokes Aside (1979), and Kenneth in John Hopkins's Lost Time (1984). Other roles were Phileas Fogg in a Jérôme Savary production of Around the World in 80 Days (1978) and Cassius in Julius Caesar (1986).

In 1979 he joined the Freie Volksbühne in Berlin, where he continued to work with Zadek. Here he played Philinte in the premiere of Enzensberger's production of Molière's The Misanthrope (1979) and Vincentio/Hortensio in The Taming of the Shrew (1981).

In 1980-81 he was a guest at the Bavarian State Theatre in Munich, playing a doctor in August Strindberg's The Father, and in 1996-97 as President von Walter in Friedrich Schiller's Intrigue and Love.

In the 1984 TV film The Wannsee Conference (Ger., Die Wannseekonferenz), Mattausch was in the starring role of SS-Obergruppenführer Reinhard Heydrich, Chief of the Reich Security Main Office (RSHA) and Deputy Reichsprotektor of Bohemia and Moravia. The film portrayed the events of the Wannsee Conference, held in Berlin in January 1942 to plan "The Final Solution" to Germany's "Jewish problem". The main theme of the film is the bureaucratic nature of the genocide.

Dietrich Mattausch starred in numerous television films and series. He gained substantial popularity from the longstanding role of chief commissioner Rick in the ARD series Der Fahnder.

In 1992 he received (together with Felix Mitterer) the Adolf Grimme Silver Award for the Piefke Saga.

Mattausch married in 1999 and lives in Berlin with his wife Annette and their three children.

== Selected filmography ==
- The Wonderful Years (1979)
- Der kostbare Gast (1979)
- Don Quixote's Children (1981)
- Der Spot oder Fast eine Karriere (1981, TV film)
- Vom Webstuhl zur Weltmacht (1983, TV series)
- The Roaring Fifties (1983)
- A Love in Germany (1983)
- Tatort: Haie vor Helgoland (1984, TV series episode)
- Der Fahnder (1984–2005, TV series, 196 episodes)
- The Record (1984)
- The Wannsee Conference (1984, TV film)
- Flammenzeichen (1985)
- Tatort: Automord (1986, TV series episode)
- Tatort: Kopflos (1989, TV series episode)
- Tatort: Schmutzarbeit (1989, TV series episode)
- Affäre Nachtfrost (1989, TV film)
- Tatort: Alles Theater (1989, TV series episode)
- The Old Fox: Ausgestiegen (1989, TV series episode)
- The State Chancellery (1989, TV film)
- The Old Fox: Mörderisches Inserat (1990, TV series episode)
- Success (1991)
- The Kaltenbach Papers (1991, TV film)
- Kollege Otto – Die Coop-Affäre (1991, TV film)
- Unser Lehrer Doktor Specht (1992–1999, TV series, 17 episodes)
- Ein Fall für zwei: Gelegenheit macht Mörder (1993, TV series episode)
- Tatort: Ein Wodka zuviel (1994, TV series episode)
- The Old Fox: Nichts geht mehr (1995, TV series episode)
- Tatort: Mordauftrag (1995, TV series episode)
- Ein Fall für zwei: Mordsgefühle (1995, TV series episode)
- Faust: Drei Tage Zeit (1995, TV series episode)
- Die Straßen von Berlin (1995–2000, TV series, 24 episodes)
- Faust: Der Goldjunge (1996, TV series episode)
- Ein Fall für zwei: Böses Blut (1996, TV series episode)
- Tatort: Das Totenspiel (1997, TV series episode)
- Tatort: Tödlicher Galopp (1997, TV series episode)
- Tatort: Todesbote (1998, TV series episode)
- Ein Fall für zwei: Mitten ins Herz (2002, TV series episode)
- Tatort: Reise ins Nichts (2002, TV series episode)
- Alarm für Cobra 11 – Die Autobahnpolizei: The Impact (2003, TV series episode)
- Tatort: Eine ehrliche Haut (2004, TV series episode)
- Ein Fall für zwei: Rollentausch (2006, TV series episode)
- Storm Tide (2006, TV film)
- Ein starkes Team: Unter Wölfen (2007, TV series episode)
- Tatort: Blinder Glaube (2008, TV series episode)
- Der letzte Bulle: Nagel ins Herz (2013, TV series episode)
