= The Miracle of Father Malachia =

The Miracle of Father Malachia Das Wunder des Malachias
- Theatrical poster
- Directed by: Bernhard Wicki
- Written by: Heinz Pauck; Bernhard Wicki based on the novel by Bruce Marshall
- Produced by: Otto Meissner
- Starring: Horst Bollmann; Richard Münch; Christiane Nielsen; Günter Pfitzmann
- Cinematography: Klaus von Rautenfeld; Gerd von Bonin
- Edited by: Carl Otto Bartning
- Music by: Hans-Martin Majewski
- Distributed by: UFA Film Hansa
- Release date: July 3, 1961; Berlin Film Festival
- Running time: 88 min.^{[A]}
- Country: West Germany
- Language: German
- Budget: 3 million DM

The Miracle of Father Malachia (German: Das Wunder des Malachias) is a 1961 West German black-and-white film directed by Bernhard Wicki and starring Horst Bollmann. The film is based on Bruce Marshall's 1931 novel Father Malachy's Miracle and tells the story of a supposed miracle in a West German town that is soon exploited and sensationalized by the media and profiteers. The film won several awards and was the official West German submission to the 34th Academy Awards for Best Foreign Language Film.

== Plot ==
Next to a church in a prosperous German industrial town is the Eden bar, a night club and brothel. The Eden bar is a thorn in the side of the worldly innocent monk Father Malachia (Horst Bollmann), who is praying to God for the bar to go away. His prayers are answered and the building and the bar and all people inside vanish and reappear on an island in the North Sea. This apparent miracle draws the attention of the media, politicians and scientists, all trying to find rational explanations. The Catholic Church is reluctant to officially recognize this occurrence as a miracle, both fearing a loss of control in matters of faith, or a loss of face if the disappearance of the Eden bar turns out to be a fabrication.

Meanwhile, believers from all over the world pilgrimage to the former location of the bar. Soon the site becomes a fairground, with the towns people, profiteers and journalists trying to make a profit from the sudden influx of pilgrims and the miracle. This includes the sale of holy water, Malachia Stollen and miniature models of the Eden bar. A young woman, who was in the bar during the night the bar vanished, becomes a media star. Financial investors are buying the island where the Eden bar reappeared, and construct a casino that soon attracts crowds of people.

Father Malachia is confronted with interview requests by journalists and by pilgrims beleaguering the church and hoping to meet him. As he has spent most of his life in the monastery, he feels helpless in the face of the excesses of modern society. He soon regrets that he asked God for a miracle. He travels to the island and prays for a second miracle that will end the frenzy, and is heard by God who returns the Eden bar to its original location.

== Cast ==
- Horst Bollmann as Father Malachias
- Richard Münch as Dr Erwin Glass
- Christiane Nielsen as Helga Glass
- Günter Pfitzmann as Rudolf Reuschel
- Brigitte Grothum as Gussy
- Karin Hübner as Nelly Moorbach
- Pinkas Braun as Christian Krüger
- Senta Berger as Yvonne Krüger
- Kurt Ehrhardt as Bishop Reuschel
- Curt Lauermann as Canon Kleinrath
- Günter Strack as Chaplain Merz
- Ludwig Thiesen as Chaplain Heidenreich
- Romuald Pekny as Papal legate
- Paul Edwin Roth as Secretary of the bishop
- Charlotte Kerr as Dr Renate Kellinghus
- Wolfgang Spier as Herr Littmann
- Günter Meisner as Preacher
- Vicco von Bülow as Dr. Schöninger

== Production ==
Wicki based his film on the 1938 novel Father Malachy's Miracle by the Scottish accountant and writer Bruce Marshall. He wrote the script together with the screenwriter Heinz Pauck, planning to not only adapt the original novel, but also to expose the "social structure of our saturated [society]" (German: "soziale Struktur unserer Sattheit"). Writing the script took more than six months, whereas the actual filming took five months.

For the main role of Father Malachias Wicki cast the stage actor Horst Bollmann, who had never played in a film. Other important roles were played by experienced film actors such as Richard Münch or Günter Pfitzmann. Supporting actors were often lay actors who played a role corresponding to their real profession, as for example journalists, press photographers or businessmen. Several known people had cameo appearances in the film, including the German translator of Justine, Maria Carlsson as a socialite, the humorist and graphic artist Loriot as a playboy and the film journalist Kurt Habernoll as a sausage vendor.

The film was shot completely on location and not a single scene was shot on a studio set. Most scenes were shot in Gelsenkirchen in the Ruhr Area. In total 95 different locations were used, including several industrial sites and the Musiktheater im Revier. A small part of the footage showing monks and priests was shot in advance at the Eucharistical World Congress in Munich. To increase the authenticity of the film Wicki used real brand names such Miele, König-Pilsener, Coca-Cola or Telefunken. Some brand names featured in fictional slogans that were used by those trying to make a profit from the miracle, for example "The girl that witnessed the miracle flies around the world with PAA". (German: "Das Mädchen, das das Wunder sah, fliegt um die Welt mit PAA") or "Stay on earth — drive Borgward" (German: "Bleib auf der Erde — fahr Borgward").

The film was planned to have its premiere at the International Film Festival in Berlin. As it was not yet completed the selection committee of the film festival saw only a raw cut of the film. This led to speculation in the tabloid press of a race against time and that Wicki had collapsed at the cutting table due to the time pressure. Ultimately the film was finished only seven hours before it premiered at the festival.

== Distribution and responses ==
Upon release the film received positive, albeit not enthusiastic, reviews by the German press. The Süddeutsche Zeitung wrote, against the background of the artistic and economic stagnation of the German film industry that Wicki is "a kind of Messiah ... who did not only have to prove himself and others his talent, but also had to show that the [German] film industry has a right to exist." (German: "eine Art Messias ... dem es nicht mehr nur oblag, sich und anderen sein Talent, sondern gleichzeitig einer ganzen Branche ihre Existenzberechtigung zu beweisen"). Die Welt wrote that "the cinema of this country [Germany] is not yet finished" (German: "der Film dieses Landes nicht am Ende [sei]").

The film won several awards. Nationally, The Miracle of Father Malachia won the Silver Bear for Best Director at the 11th Berlin International Film Festival in 1961, and three German film awards in the categories Best Actor, Best Set Design and a Filmband in Silber for Best Feature Film in 1962. In 1961 it also won the prize of German Film Critics, the Goldene Muschel mit Perle in the category Best Actor and the Bambi for best artistic achievement in the category German film.

Internationally the film won the Prize of the City at the Valladolid International Film Festival in 1963. It was also chosen as West Germany's official submission to the 34th Academy Awards for Best Foreign Language Film, but did not manage to receive a nomination.

== Notes ==
^{[A]} Two other, longer versions of the film exist. One version has a length of 126 minutes and was originally rated as no children under 16 admitted by the Freiwillige Selbstkontrolle der Filmwirtschaft. The other version has a length of 122 minutes.
