= The Blood of the Walsungs (film) =

1965 film

- Film poster
- Directed by: Rolf Thiele
- Written by: Ennio Flaiano; Erika Mann; Thomas Mann; Franz Seitz, Jr.
- Produced by: Franz Seitz
- Starring: Michael Maien
- Cinematography: Wolf Wirth
- Edited by: Ingeborg Taschner
- Music by: Rolf Alexander Wilhelm
- Production company: Franz Seitz Filmproduktion
- Distributed by: Columbia-Bavaria Filmgesellschaft
- Release date: 21 January 1965
- Running time: 86 minutes
- Country: West Germany
- Language: German

The Blood of the Walsungs (German: Wälsungenblut) is a 1965 West German drama film directed by Rolf Thiele, based on a Thomas Mann novella of the same name written in 1905 and published in 1921. It was entered in the 15th Berlin International Film Festival. The title refers to the ill-fated Völsung clan as told in the Völsunga saga; the roles of Siegmund and Sieglinde refer to Sigmund and Signy as depicted in Richard Wagner's opera Die Walküre. It was shot at the Bavaria Studios in Munich.

== Cast ==
- Michael Maien as Siegmund Arnstatt
- Elena Nathanael as Sieglinde Arnstatt
- Gerd Baltus as Lieutenant Beckerath
- Gunther Malzacher as Rittmeister Kunz Arnstatt
- Rudolf Forster as Count Arnstatt
- Margot Hielscher as Countess Isabella Arnstatt
- Ingeborg Hallstein as Countess Märit Arnstatt
- Heinz-Leo Fischer as Wendelin, a servant
- Karl-Heinz Peters as Florian, a servant
- Christoph Quest as Von Gelbsattel, an officer
- Rudolf Rhomberg
