= Where the Sky Begins =

Canadian television series

- Les Faucheurs de marguerites
- Directed by: Marcel Camus
- Countries of origin: France, Canada, Germany
- Original language: French
- No. of seasons: 1
- No. of episodes: 14

Production
- Running time: 26 minutes
- Production companies: Bavaria Films; ORTF; Radio-Canada; Telcia Films

Original release
- Network: Troisième chaîne couleur de l'ORTF
- Release: 27 May – 26 June 1974

Where the Sky Begins (French: Les Faucheurs de marguerites, lit. 'The Daisy Cutters') is a 1974 French-Canadian-German television series. In Canada, it aired on CBC Television in English in 1976. It was followed by Le temps des as (1978), La conquête du ciel (1980) and L'adieu aux as (1982).

== Premise ==
This 14-part series concerned the history of aviation, an international joint production of Bavaria Films, ORTF, Radio-Canada and Telcia Films. It was originally produced in French, then the English-dubbed version was developed by Cinelume Productions under the direction of Donnalu Wigmore of CBC's Toronto headquarters.

Bruno Pradal portrayed Edward Dabert in this docudrama.

== Cast ==
- Jean-Jacques Moreau : Gabriel Voisin
- Roger Pigaut : Capitaine Ferber
- Jackie Sardou : Madame Perrier
- Bruno Pradal : Edouard Dabert
- Christine Wodetzky : Jeanne Dabert
- Joachim Hansen : Lilienthal
- Gernot Endemann : Hans

== Scheduling ==
The English version of this half-hour series was broadcast on CBC Television Thursdays at 7:30 p.m. (Eastern time) from 3 June to 16 September 1976. It was rebroadcast on weekday afternoons in October 1978, and in a Sunday time slot in 1979.

== See also ==
- List of German television series
