= Die rote Kapelle =

West German television series

- Directed by: Franz Peter Wirth
- Starring: Werner Kreindl; Georges Claisse; Rada Rassimov; Grégoire Aslan; Philippe Lemaire
- Country of origin: West Germany, France, Italy

Die rote Kapelle is a 1972 West German television mini series on the anti-Nazi resistance and espionage organization called "Red Orchestra" by the Gestapo. The series was released one year after the East German film KLK an PTX - Die rote Kapelle on the very same subject.

== See also ==
- List of German television series
