= Gerd Baltus =

German actor (1932–2019)

- Born: 29 March 1932; Bremen, Germany
- Died: 13 December 2019 (aged 87); Hamburg, Germany

Gerd Baltus (29 March 1932 – 13 December 2019) was a German television actor.

Baltus was born in Bremen. While doing law studies Baltus became interested in acting. In 1952 he got his first theatre booking in Hamburg, later in Bonn, West Berlin and Munich.

Baltus became known to a broad public however above all as a regular guest with crime film series such as Derrick and Tatort. He had basic roles also in the miniseries PS (1975) and in the popular family saga Lorentz & Söhne, where he starred with Ernst Schröder and Hans Korte before the camera. Besides his film work Baltus worked extensively as a speaker of radio plays.

In 1964 he received the Federal Film Award for his work in the film The Blood of the Walsungs. He died in Hamburg.

== Filmography ==
Year	Title	Role	Notes
1965	The Blood of the Walsungs	Justus / Leutnant	
1966	I Am Looking for a Man	Studienrat Benzinger	
1967	Bonditis	Frank Born	
1967	Der Tod läuft hinterher	Harry Brenton	2 episodes
1968	Madame Legros	Chevalier d'Angelot	TV film
1968	Komm nur, mein liebstes Vögelein	Commentator	
1968	Der Idiot	Prince Myshkin	TV miniseries
1969	Rotmord	Ernst Toller	TV film
1970	The Age of the Fish	Teacher	
1970	Christmas Not Just Once a Year	Narrator	TV film
1973	The Caretaker	Aston	TV film
1974	Ein ganz perfektes Ehepaar	Robert Krieg	TV film
1975–1976	PS	Volker Schmitting	8 episodes
1975	Der Strick um den Hals	Galpin	TV miniseries
1977–1994	Derrick	Konrad Schreiber / Kubeck / Abel / Hahne / Dr. Schöler / Erich Kleemann / Lehrer / Karl Hauweg / Martin Schlehdorn	9 episodes
1978	Die Anstalt	Dr. Steinhausen	
1978	Lean Times	Dr. Peter Helfrich	12 episodes
1985	Angry Harvest	Geistlicher	
1985	Die Einsteiger	Direktor Kappellusch	
1986	Teufels Großmutter	Frank Engelhardt	12 episodes
1986	Käthe Kollwitz	Sander	
1988	Lorentz & Söhne	Gerhard Lorentz	11 episodes
1989–1992	Mit Leib und Seele	Klaus Bardusch	16 episodes
1993–1997	Ein Bayer auf Rügen	Donatius Domberger	45 episodes
1996	Unser Lehrer Doktor Specht	Herr Hohlbein	13 episodes
1999	Der Hochstapler	Sommer	TV film
2003	Tiger Eyes See Better	Gernot	TV film
