= Horst Bollmann =

German actor

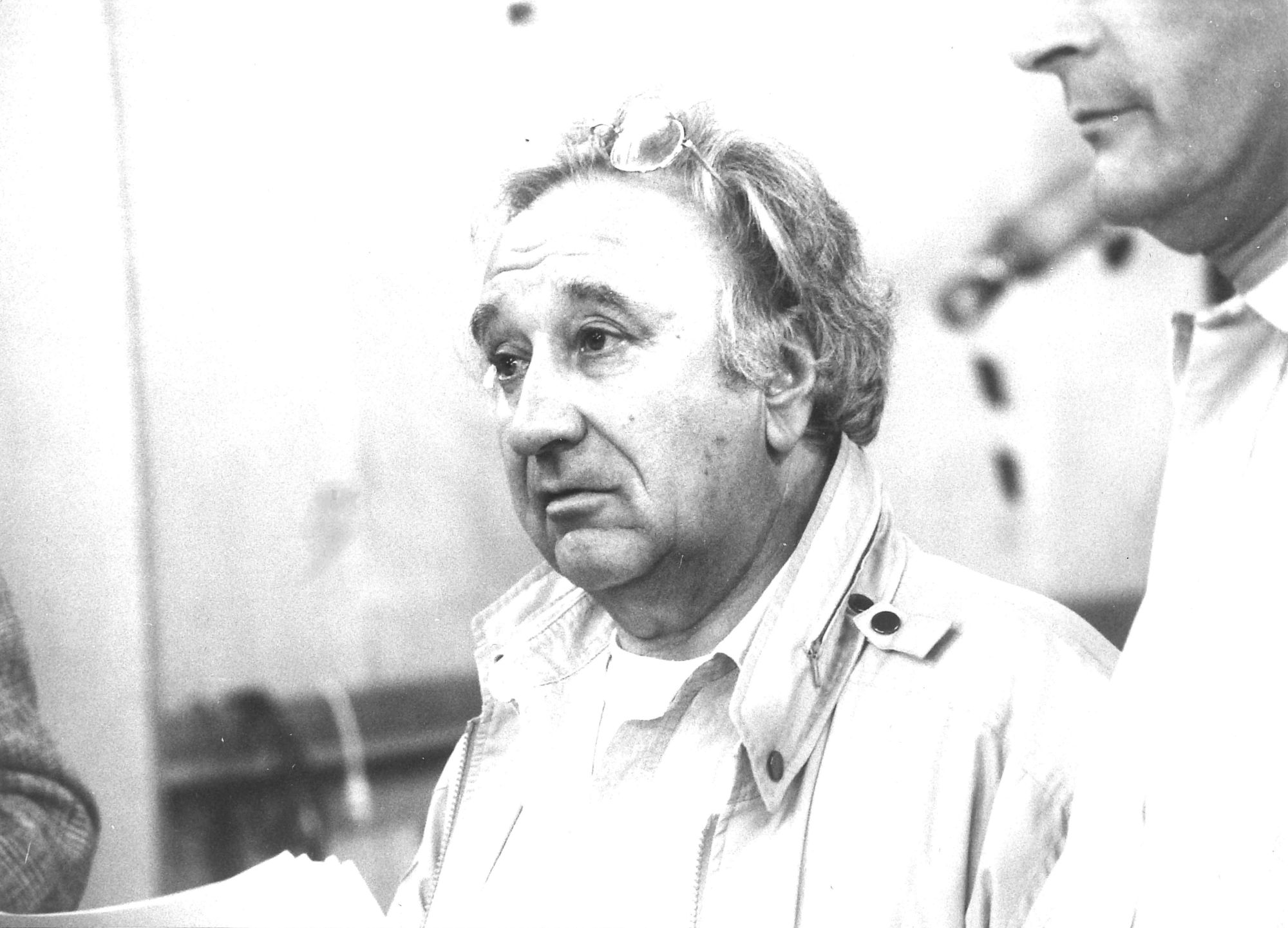
Horst Bollmann

Horst Bollmann (11 February 1925 – 7 July 2014) was a German film and television actor. He was born in Dessau.

== Filmography ==
Year	Title	Role	Notes
1961	The Miracle of Father Malachia	Father Malachia	
1967	Das ausgefüllte Leben des Alexander Dubronski	Lothar Krake	TV film
1970	Wie ein Blitz	Inspector Clay	TV miniseries
1988	Incident at Twilight	Fürchtegott Hofer	
