= Michael Maien =

German film and television actor (born 1947)

- Born: Michael Maier; October 12, 1947 (age 78); Germany
- Occupation: Actor
- Years active: 1965-

Michael Maien is a German film and television actor.

== Selected filmography ==
- The Blood of the Walsungs (1965)
- Once a Greek (1966)
- Forty Eight Hours to Acapulco (1967)
- Take Off Your Clothes, Doll (1968)
- Hotel Royal (1969, TV film)
- Mark of the Devil (1970)
- Hotel by the Hour (1970)
- Eye in the Labyrinth (1972)
- Emanuelle Meets the Wife Swappers (1973)
- 2069: A Sex Odyssey (1974)

== Bibliography ==
- John Kenneth Muir. Horror Films of the 1970s. McFarland, 2002.
