= Günter Strack =

German actor (1929–1999)

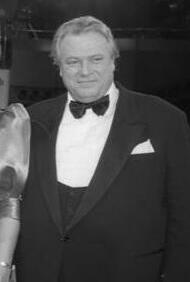
- Strack in 1986
- Born: 4 June 1929; Darmstadt, Germany
- Died: 18 January 1999 (aged 69); Münchsteinach, Germany
- Occupation: Actor
- Years active: 1958–1999
- Spouse: Lore Hennig (m. 1958)
- Children: 1

Günter Strack (4 June 1929 – 18 January 1999) was a German film and television actor.

== Career ==
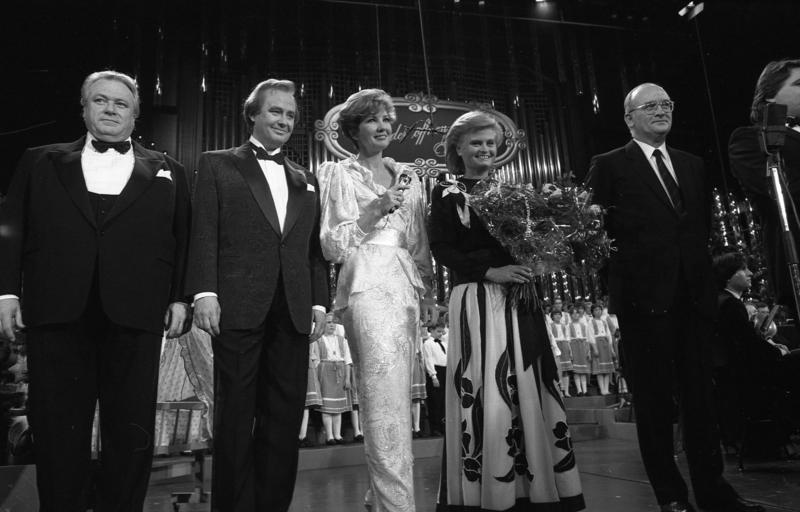
Günter Strack (left) at an event for charity, 1986

In English language films, he played Professor Karl Manfred in the Hitchcock thriller Torn Curtain (1966) and appeared as Kunik in The Odessa File (1974). In Germany, he was known for his roles in the crime series Ein Fall für zwei and the family series Diese Drombuschs.

== Death ==
He died from heart failure. His wife Lore died in 2014 at the age of 77.

== Selected filmography ==
Film
Year	Title	Role	Notes
1961	The Miracle of Father Malachia	Kaplan Merz	
1966	Torn Curtain	Professor Karl Manfred	
1966	Maigret and His Greatest Case	Kommissar Delvigne	
1974	The Odessa File	Kunik	
1974	Eintausend Milliarden	Mann aus der Industrie	TV film
1974	Assassination in Davos		
1976	Die Affäre Lerouge	Daburon	TV film
1978	The Glass Cell	Goller	
1979	Phantasten	Hammerich	TV film
1980	Der Thronfolger	King Frederick William I	TV film
1983	The Swing	Professor von Zwinger	
1989	Asterix and the Big Fight	Obelix	German version, Voice
Television Series
Year	Title	Role	Notes
1972	Einmal im Leben – Geschichte eines Eigenheims	Kurt Wumme	3 episodes
1975–1977	Derrick	Herr Kless / Herr Greiser	2 episodes
1978	Lean Times	Alfred Mildezahn	11 episodes
1978	Ein Mann will nach oben	Ernst Gollmer	7 episodes
1979	Iron Gustav	Bankdirektor Hoppe	1 episode
1981	Tod eines Schülers	Horst Wagner	6 episodes
1981–1988	Ein Fall für zwei	Dr. Dieter Renz	60 episodes
1985–1994	Diese Drombuschs	Uncle Ludwig	33 episodes
1986–1990	Hessische Geschichten		11 episodes
1989–1993	Mit Leib und Seele	Pfarrer Adam Kempfert	51 episodes
1994–1998	Der König	Hannes König	32 episodes
1996	The Shadow Man	Dr. Hans Möllbach	5 episodes
