= Martin May (actor) =

German actor (born 1961)

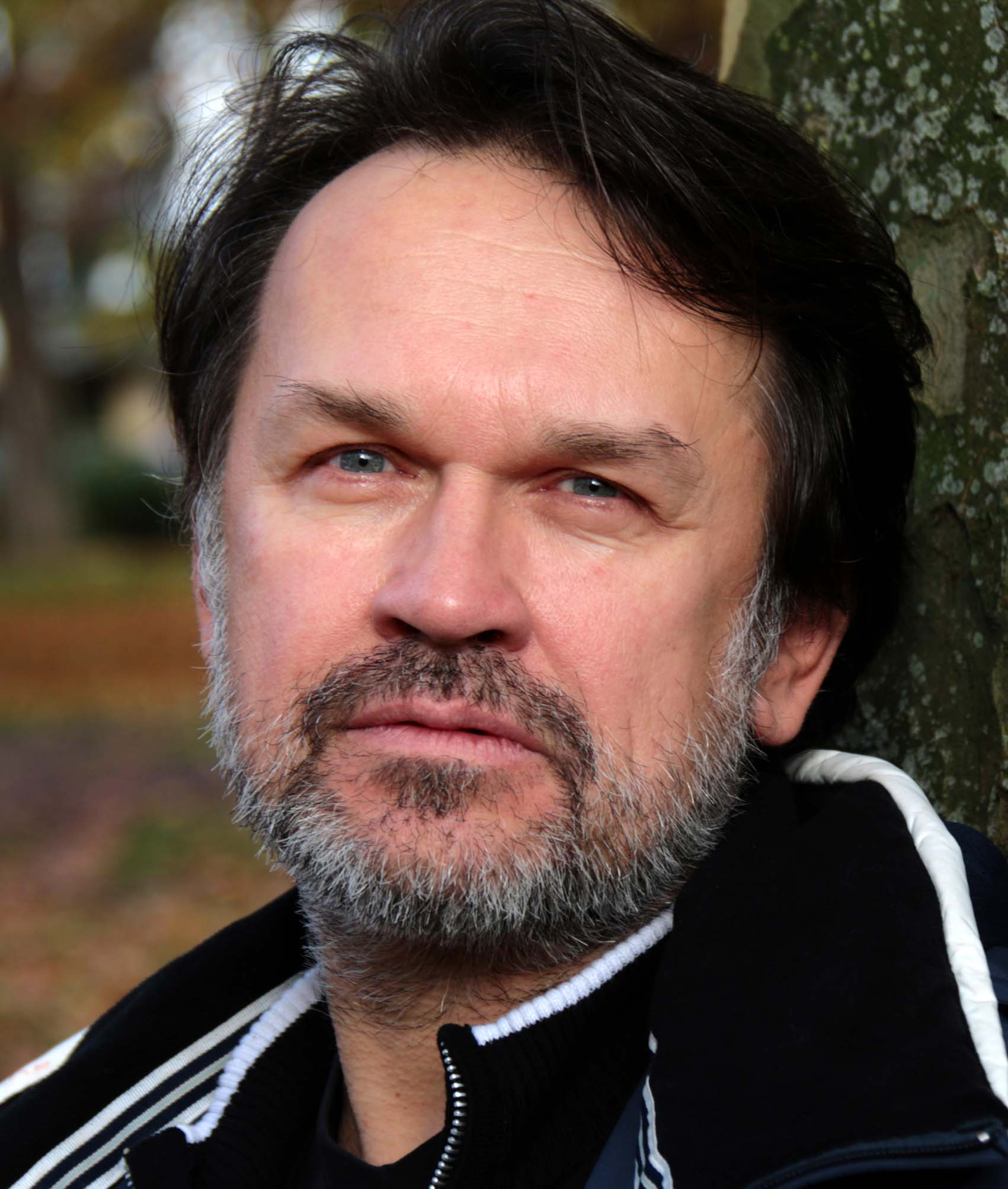
Martin May (2015)

Martin May (born 21 April 1961) is a German actor best known for his portrayal as "Midshipman Ullmann" in the submarine war classic Das Boot as well as several years of voice acting, including voicing Diesel in the German dub of Thomas the Tank Engine & Friends. His live action work after Das Boot included mostly German television films.

== Filmography ==
- The Wonderful Years (1979) - Stephan
- Das Boot (1981) - Ullman
- Strange Fruits (1983) - Andi
- Der Sohn des Bullen (1984) - Tommi
- Der Flieger (1986) - Bernd Klinger
- The Crack Connection (1987) - 17 year old drug addicted
- Lorentz & Söhne (1988, TV series) - Jochen Bienger
- Andy (1992)
- Sex, Dogz and Rock n Roll (2011) - Mad B (voice)
