= Siegfried Wischnewski =

German actor

- Born: 15 April 1922; Saborowen, East Prussia, Weimar Germany
- Died: 24 January 1989 (aged 66); Königswinter
- Occupation: actor

Siegfried Wischnewski (15 April 1922 – 24 January 1989) was a German stage and film actor.

== Career ==
Wischnewski was born in the Masurian village of Saborowen, then in German East Prussia (today Zaborowo, Poland) to a peasant labourer. He decided to become an actor after he appeared at a school theater, but was conscripted into Nazi Germany's Kriegsmarine after he had passed his Abitur at the Arndt-Gymnasium at Berlin-Dahlem in 1940. As a professional actor he appeared at the theater of Lüneburg in 1946 and in the following years at several other stages in Germany.

In the late 1950s and 1960s he became well known for his TV-appearances, often as a police detective. He played several roles in popular TV-productions like The Squeaker, Tatort, Derrick or Der Kommissar but also in movie versions of Brecht's Dreigroschenoper (1962) or the Nibelungen (1966–67).

Probably his most significant success was the role of a veterinary in the 1980s TV-production Ein Heim für Tiere. Wischnewski was twice married to the actress Suzanne Ritter, from 1948 till 1956 and 1963 till Wischnewski's death of bronchial cancer at Königswinter in 1989.

== Selected filmography ==
- Jons und Erdme (1959)
- The Last Witness (1960)
- The Liar (1961)
- He Can't Stop Doing It (1962)
- The Squeaker (1963)
- The Threepenny Opera (1963)
- Tim Frazer (1964, TV miniseries)
- In the Matter of J. Robert Oppenheimer (1964, TV film)
- Melissa (1966, TV miniseries)
- The Investigation (1966, TV film)
- Die Nibelungen (1966/67)
- Dead Run (1967)
- The Long Day of Inspector Blomfield (1968)
- Der Senator (1968, TV film)
- Rotmord (1969, TV film)
- Maximilian von Mexiko (1970, TV miniseries)
- Friede den Hütten! Krieg den Palästen! (1970, TV film)
- Butterflies Don't Cry (1970)
- Immobilien (1973, TV film)
- Bauern, Bonzen und Bomben (1973, TV miniseries)
- Zwei himmlische Dickschädel (1974)
- Die Stadt im Tal (1975, TV film)
- Der tödliche Schlag (1975, TV film)
- Derrick - Season 2, Episode 10: "Kamillas junger Freund" (1975, TV series episode)
- Strongman Ferdinand (1976)
- Sladek oder Die schwarze Armee (1976, TV film)
- Bei Westwind hört man keinen Schuß (1976, TV film)
- Generale – Anatomie der Marneschlacht (1977, TV film)
- The Devil's Bed (1978)
- Die Quelle (1979, TV film)
- Es begann bei Tiffany (1979, TV film)
- Derrick - Season 6, Episode 05: "Die Puppe" (1979, TV series episode)
- Derrick - Season 7, Episode 03: "Ein Lied aus Theben" (1980, TV series episode)
- Derrick - Season 7, Episode 10: "Eine unheimlich starke Persönlichkeit" (1980, TV series episode)
- Exil (1981, TV miniseries)
- Derrick - Season 10, Episode 3: "Geheimnisse einer Nacht" (1983, TV series episode)
- Vor dem Sturm (1984, TV miniseries)
- Die Rückkehr der Zeitmaschine (1984, TV film)
