= Werner Kreindl =

Austrian actor (1927–1992)

- Born: 20 October 1927; Wels, Austria
- Died: 6 June 1992 (aged 64); Wagrain, Austria
- Occupation: actor
- Years active: 1966—1992

Werner Kreindl (20 October 1927 – 6 June 1992) was an Austrian television actor.

He appeared in 68 TV programmes between 1966 and his death in 1992. He was probably best known for his appearances in SOKO 5113 from 1978 to 1992.

== Filmography ==
=== Film ===
- 1962: Two Bavarians in Bonn - Abgeordneter Dobler (uncredited)
- 1970: Angels with Burnt Wings - Herr Bertram Susmeit
- 1980: As Far as the Eye Sees - Dr. Lauscher
- 1980: The Formula - Schellenberg
- 1981: Student Gerber - Professor 'Gott' Kupfer
- 1985: Seitenstechen - Doctor
- 1985: Die Einsteiger - Kommissar Gierke
- 1986: Chocolate Cop - Sir Archibald Brington
- 1986: Geld oder Leber - Kommissar
- 1987: Kunyonga: Murder in Africa - Thorwald
- 1990: Non-Stop Trouble in the Hospital - Prof. Havlicek
- 1991: Der 13. Tag - Jan Masaryk

=== Television ===
- 1965: Zeitsperre (TV film) - Jarvis
- 1966: Freiheit im Dezember (TV film) - Lomow
- 1967: Nobile – Sieben Wochen auf dem Eis (TV miniseries) - Prof. Dr. Franz Behounek
- 1967: Der Reichstagsbrandprozess (TV film) - Göring
- 1969: Epitaph für einen König (TV film) - Graf Arvid Horn
- 1969: Amerika oder der Verschollene (TV film) - Green
- 1969: Der zweite Schuß (TV film) - Patrice
- 1970: Der Kommissar: Messer im Rücken (TV series episode) - Kurre
- 1970: Unter Kuratel (TV film) - Dr. M. C. Bellmann
- 1970: Ein ruhiges Heim (TV Short) - Herr Boulingrin
- 1970: Sir Henri Deterding (TV film) - Churchill
- 1970: Pakbo (TV film) - Dora
- 1970: Millionen nach Maß (TV miniseries) - Enrique Alcoferado
- 1970: Der Kirschgarten (TV film) - Kaufmann Lopachin
- 1971: Oliver (TV film) - Redakteur Sailer
- 1971: Der Kommissar: Tod eines Ladenbesitzers (TV series episode) - Sierich
- 1972: Die rote Kapelle (TV miniseries) - Leopold Trepper
- 1972: Ferdinand Lassalle (TV film) - Karl Marx
- 1972: Die Bilder laufen (TV film) - Charles Pathé
- 1974: Eine geschiedene Frau: Warten auf Ioannina (TV series episode) - Siebert
- 1974: Tatort: Gefährliche Wanzen (TV series episode) - Wöhrle
- 1974: Am Morgen meines Todes (TV film)
- 1974: The Moonstone (TV film) - Dr. Ezra Jennings
- 1975: The Unguarded House (TV film) - Bresgote
- 1975: Derrick: Mitternachtsbus (TV series episode) - Oskar Holler
- 1975: Sonderdezernat K1: Sackgasse (TV series episode) - Georg Maertz
- 1975: Der Kommissar: Ein Mord auf dem Lande (TV series episode) - Krüger
- 1976: Minna von Barnhelm (TV film) - Werner
- 1976: Feinde (TV film) - Michail Skrobotow
- 1976: Der Winter, der ein Sommer war (TV miniseries) - Doktor Banks
- 1976: Der Menschenfeind (TV film) - Philinte
- 1977: Walter Hasenclever (TV film) - Feuchtwanger
- 1977: Richelieu, le Cardinal de Velours (TV miniseries) - Illo
- 1977: Roulette (TV film)
- 1978: Kleine Geschichten mit großen Tieren (TV film) - Chef
- 1978: Wallenstein (TV miniseries) - Maximilian I.
- 1978: Holocaust (TV miniseries) - Herr Helms
- 1978: Stützen der Gesellschaft (TV film) - Konsul Bernick
- 1978–1992: SOKO 5113 (TV series, 126 episodes) - Kriminalhauptkommissar Karl Göttmann
- 1979: The Old Fox: Der Abgrund (TV series episode) - Dr. Albert Koll
- 1979: Die Quelle (TV film) - Eissenmann jun.
- 1979: Die großen Sebastians (TV film) - Sergeant Dobrowsky
- 1979: Augenblicke – 4 Szenen mit Paula Wessely (TV film) - Mann in der Gondelbahn
- 1980: Derrick: Tödliche Sekunden (TV series episode) - Albert Rudolf
- 1980: Der Fall Walrawe (TV film) - Walrawe
- 1980: The Old Fox: Vertrauensstellung (TV series episode) - Dr. Koch
- 1980: Knobbes Knoten (TV film) - Dr. Winter
- 1981: Die Wildente (TV film) - Hjalmar
- 1981: The Old Fox: Urlaub aus dem Knast (TV series episode) - Bruno Kalvig
- 1982: Derrick: Eine Falle für Derrick (TV series episode) - Prosecutor
- 1982: The Old Fox: Der rote Faden (TV series episode) - Gustav Staschek
- 1982: Das Dorf an der Grenze (TV miniseries) - KPÖ-Sekretär
- 1982: Der schwarze Bumerang (TV miniseries) - Stadtstreicher
- 1983: The Winds of War (TV miniseries) - Colonel General Franz Halder
- 1983: Das Protokoll (TV film) - Adolf Eichmann / Actor
- 1983–1985: Unsere schönsten Jahre (TV series) - Alfons Lehner
- 1983: Die Matrosen von Kronstadt (TV film) - Kuzmin
- 1984: Das schöne Ende dieser Welt (TV film) - Dr. Raben
- 1984: The Old Fox: Von Mord war nicht die Rede (TV series episode) - Dr. Damholz
- 1985: Der eiserne Weg (TV miniseries) - Herr Kriele
- 1985: The Old Fox: Wiederholungstäter (TV series episode) - Herbert Hauser
- 1986: Auf den Tag genau (TV film)
- 1987: Gambit (TV film) - Cornelius
- 1987: Top Kids (TV film) - Emil Jellinek
- 1988: Das Winterhaus (TV film)
- 1988: Hessische Geschichten (TV series episode) - Direktor Joachim Tobler
- 1989: Derrick: Blaue Rose (TV series episode) - Arthur
- 1991: Dido – Das Geheimnis des Fisches (TV miniseries) - Bischof
- 1991: Death Came As a Friend (TV film) - Korten
