= Alexander Hegarth =

German actor (1923–1984)

- Born: 26 July 1923; Dresden, Saxony, Germany
- Died: 14 November 1984 (aged 61); Gummersbach, North Rhine-Westphalia, West Germany
- Occupation: Actor
- Years active: 1954–1984 (film & TV)

Alexander Hegarth (26 July 1923 – 14 November 1984) was a German film and television actor.

== Selected filmography ==
=== Film ===
- My Wife Makes Music (1958)
- The Twins from Immenhof (1973)

=== Television ===
- Maximilian von Mexiko (1970)
- Arsène Lupin (1971) season 1, episode 12
- The Buddenbrooks (1979)

== Bibliography ==
- Franz Josef Görtz & Hans Sarkowicz. Heinz Rühmann, 1902-1994: der Schauspieler und sein Jahrhundert. C.H.Beck, 2001.
