= Maximilian von Mexiko =

- Genre: Historical
- Written by: Answald Krüger; Maria Matray
- Directed by: Günter Gräwert
- Starring: Michael Heltau; Christine Wodetzky; Siegfried Wischnewski
- No. of episodes: 2 episodes

Production
- Running time: 185 minutes

Original release
- Network: ZDF West Germany; ORF (Austria)
- Release: 20 March – 22 March 1970

Maximilian von Mexiko is a 1970 German-Austrian historical television miniseries depicting the events of the French Intervention in Mexico which placed Emperor Maximilian on the throne of Mexico. It consisted of two parts totalling 185 minutes.

== Cast ==
- Michael Heltau as Maximilian
- Christine Wodetzky as Charlotte
- Siegfried Wischnewski as Napoleon III
- Katharina Matz as Kaiserin Eugenie
- Albert Rueprecht as Kaiser Franz Joseph
- Kurd Pieritz as Graf Rechberg
- Hans Paetsch as Pope Pius IX
- Richard Münch as Cardinal
- Wolfgang Borchert as Bischof Pereda
- Walter Klam as Herzog von Morny
- Alexander Hegarth as Graf von Saligny
- O.A. Buck as Graf Drouyn De Lhuys
- Kurt A. Jung as Graf D'Arcy
- Herbert Fleischmann as Sir Charles Wyke
- Heinz Spitzner as Lord Russel
- Herbert Steinmetz as Seward
- Horst Beck as Bankier Jecker
- Charles Brauer as Hidalgo
- Wolfgang Weiser as Gutierrez
- Friedrich Schütter as Almonte
- Josef Dahmen as General Bazaine
- Kurt Schmitt-Mainz as General Graf Prim
- Karl-Heinz Kreienbaum as Steinsen
- Peter Maertens as General Miramon
- Uwe Friedrichsen as General Mejia
- Wolfgang Rau as General Marques
- Fritz von Friedl as Dr. Basch
- Norbert Skalden as Prinz Salm
- Petra Mood as Prinzessin Salm
- Dieter Borsche as Benito Juárez
- Hans Schellbach as General Escobedo
- Rolf Schimpf as Oberst Vilianueva
- Christian Claaszen as Oberst Lopez
- Manfred Reddemann as Peter Corona
