= Mit Leib und Seele (TV series) =

German TV series (1989-1993)

Mit Leib und Seele was a German TV series which ran from September 1989 to July 1993 on ZDF. The 51 episodes revolved around the life of a pastor Adam Kempfert, played by Günter Strack, as he dealt with the problems of his flock in a town near Frankfurt am Main. Audiences were around 15 million for each episode. The series launched the career of Barbara Auer and was syndicated in Italy.
