= Hotel Royal (film) =

1969 West German television film

- Written by: Answald Krüger; Maria Matray
- Directed by: Wolfgang Becker
- Starring: Joachim Fuchsberger; Nadja Tiller; Paul Hubschmid
- Music by: Peter Thomas
- Country of origin: West Germany
- Original language: German

Production
- Producer: Helmut Ringelmann
- Cinematography: Rolf Kästel
- Editor: Cornelia Rohe
- Running time: 90 minutes
- Production company: Neue Münchner Fernsehproduktion

Original release
- Network: ZDF
- Release: 14 December 1969

Hotel Royal is a 1969 West German television mystery crime drama film directed by Wolfgang Becker and starring Joachim Fuchsberger, Nadja Tiller and Paul Hubschmid. The film's sets were designed by the art director Wolf Englert. It was first broadcast on ZDF on 14 December 1969.

== Synopsis ==
A number of wealthy guests are staying at the luxurious Hotel Royal in the French spa town of Évian close to the Swiss border. A series of elaborate robberies occur including the theft of the Maharani of Dungapur's jewels.

== Cast ==
- Joachim Fuchsberger as Chris Norman
- Nadja Tiller as Florence Donovan
- Paul Hubschmid as Van Cleef
- Karin Hübner as Rose Charpentier
- Hanns Ernst Jäger as René Blair
- Lil Dagover as Die Maharani
- Anthony Steel as Sir Robert Gunningham
- Anne-Marie Blanc as Miss Patrick
- Friedrich Joloff as Clement
- Pinkas Braun as Deval
- Robert Meyn as Fauvet
- Herbert Bötticher as Fotoladenbesitzer
- Heidi Abel as Reporterin
- Michael Maien as Amiel
- Jan Hendriks as Legrand
- Erland Erlandsen as Waffenexperte
- Wolfgang Scholz as Eric Huntleigh
- Leo Bardischewski as Leiter der Tresorfächer
- Tony Stahl as Mitarbeiter der Tresorfächer
- Charles Regnier as Narrator

== Bibliography ==
- Bock, Hans-Michael & Bergfelder, Tim. The Concise CineGraph. Encyclopedia of German Cinema. Berghahn Books, 2009.
