= Benjamin Lev =

Israeli-American professor

- בנימין לב
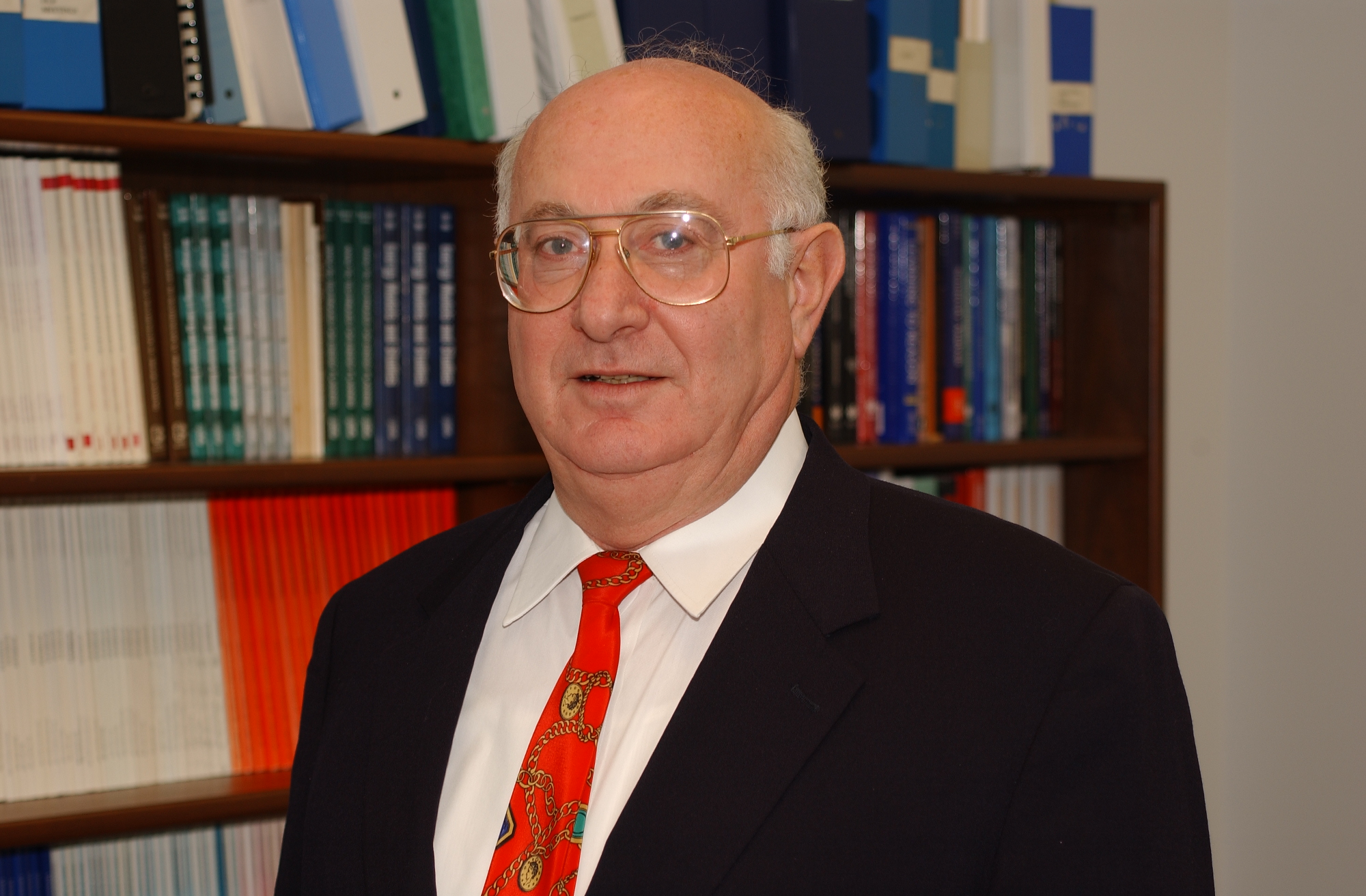
- Born: December 24, 1942 (age 83); Mandatory Palestine, British Empire
- Citizenship: USA, Israel
- Education: Case Western Reserve University; Technion-Israel Institute of Technology
- Known for: Former (2002-2025) Editor-In-Chief, OMEGA - The International Journal of Management Science. Co-Editor-In-Chief (2006 - present), International Journal of Management Science and Engineering Management Former Book Review Editor, Journal on Applied Analytics (23 years, 700 book reviews). Former Associate Editor Journal of Operations Research; IIE Transactions; International Abstracts of Operations Research. Associate Editor Operations Research Perspective; Financial Innovation; OPSEARCH; Journal of Data; Information and management; IJAA.
- Spouse: Dorota "Debbie" Lev (1945-2016)
- Children: 2
- Awards: INFORMS Senior Fellow (2003)
- Website: www.OmegaJournal.org

Benjamin Lev (Hebrew: בנימין לב; born December 24, 1942) is an American-Israeli professor and former University Trustee Professor of Decision Sciences and Management Information Systems Department at Drexel University. He has been a prolific author and has made significant contributions in Operations Research and Management Science. He has contributed to the areas of inventory control, mathematical programming, and operations planning and scheduling. He is well known for his developments of Inventory Control Models, Transportation Problems, DEA and Fuzzy Decision Analyses.

His present editorial positions include the former (2002-2025) Editor-In-Chief of OMEGA - The International Journal of Management Science and the Co-Editor-In-Chief (2006 - present) of International Journal of Management Science and Engineering Management.

== Education ==
Lev received his PhD. in Operations Research from Case Western Reserve University. He has M.Sc. in Industrial Engineering and B.Sc. in Mechanical Engineering from the Technion – Israel Institute of Technology.

== Academic career ==
Lev is a professor and former Head of Decision Sciences Department at Drexel University since 2009. From 1990 to 2009 he served as the Dean of the School of Management, the Chair of Department of Management Studies, Professor and an Emeritus Professor at University of Michigan–Dearborn. From 1987 to 1990 he served as the Head of The Management Department at Worcester Polytechnic Institute, Worcester MA, and from 1970 to 1987 he served as the Chair of Management Department and a professor at Temple University.

He is holding or has held a series of short faculty appointments at several universities as visiting professor, honorary professor, or adjunct professor: Wharton School (spring 1986), Tel-Aviv University (1974–75), San Jose State University (summer 1987), Tianjin University (summer 1986), Beijing Jiaotong University (2017–20), Chengdu University (2017–20), Nanjing University of Aeronautics and Astronautics (2018–20), Nanjing University of Information Science and Technology (2018–), Nanjing Audit University (2018–) and Xidian University (2019-)

== Honors and awards ==
- Biographical sketch in Young Scientists in Israel, pp. 148‑156, Remba, Rubin Mass, 1971.
- Intergovernmental Professional Act (IPA), Dept. of Energy, Washington, D.C., 1978.
- Trustee Professor, Drexel University, Philadelphia Pennsylvania, USA 2014-2021.

== Books ==
Co-author and co-editor of these books:

- "A Review of: "INTRODUCTION TO MATHEMATICAL PROGRAMMING. QUANTITATIVE TOOLS FOR DECISION MAKING"". Engineering Optimization. 6 (4): 238–239. 1 January 1983. doi:10.1080/03052158308928047.
- Lev, Benjamin (1983). Energy Models and Studies. North-Holland. ISBN 978-0-444-86601-1.
- Lev, Benjamin (1984). Analytic Techniques for Energy Planning: Proceedings of the First Symposium. North Holland. ISBN 978-0-444-86884-8.
- Lev, Benjamin (1986). Production Management: Methods and Studies. North-Holland. ISBN 978-0-444-87986-8.
- Lev, Benjamin; Bloom, Jeremy A. (1987). Strategic Planning in Energy and Natural Resources: Proceedings of the Second Symposium on Analytic Techniques for Energy, Natural Resources, and Environmental Planning. North-Holland. ISBN 978-0-444-70230-2.
- Márquez, Fausto Pedro García; Lev, Benjamin (2013-03-06). Engineering Management. BoD – Books on Demand. ISBN 978-953-51-1037-8.
- Márquez, Fausto Pedro García; Lev, Benjamin (2015-01-24). Advanced Business Analytics. Springer. ISBN 978-3-319-11415-6.
- Márquez, Fausto Pedro García; Lev, Benjamin (2016-11-15). Big Data Management. Springer. ISBN 978-3-319-45498-6.
- Márquez, Fausto Pedro García; Lev, Benjamin (2019-01-04). Data Science and Digital Business. Springer. ISBN 978-3-319-95651-0.
- Márquez, Fausto Pedro García; Lev, Benjamin (2021-07-13). Internet of Things: Cases and Studies. Springer Nature. ISBN 978-3-030-70478-0.
- Márquez, Fausto Pedro García; Lev, Benjamin (2021-09-28). Introduction to Internet of Things in Management Science and Operations Research: Implemented Studies. Springer Nature. ISBN 978-3-030-74644-5.
- Márquez, Fausto Pedro García; Lev, Benjamin (2023-01-16). Sustainability: Cases and Studies in Using Operations Research and Management Science Methods. Springer Nature. ISBN 978-3-031-16620-4.
- Garcia-Marquez, F. P., Lev, B. and Liao, H. (Eds.), Outsourcing Using Operations Research and Management Science Methods – From Theory to Practice, Springer, 267 pages, September 2025, ISBN 978-3-031-91844-5.
- Garcia-Marquez, F. P., Lev, B. and Liao, H. (Eds.), Outsourcing - Cases and Studies in Using Operations Research and Management Science Methods, Springer, 219 pages, September 2025. ISBN 978-3-031-95392-7.
- Xu, J., Lev, B., Li, Z. (Eds.), Innovation decision-making under uncertain environment, Routledge, 144 pages, June 2026, ISBN 978 1 041 306511
