= Marcel Prawy =

Austrian dramaturg, opera connoisseur and opera critic

Cover of book Marcel Prawy: Glück, das mir verblieb, ISBN 3-85498-174-0

Marcel Prawy (birth name: Marcel Horace Frydmann, Ritter von Prawy) (born 29 December 1911, in Vienna – died 23 February 2003, in Vienna) was an Austrian dramaturg, opera connoisseur and opera critic. He was born into a Jewish Austro-Hungarian noble family and studied law, but his life belonged to the opera. He became secretary of the tenor Jan Kiepura and they both emigrated to the United States when persecution of the Austrian Jews became unbearable in the late 1930s.

With the help of his confidante Mártha Eggerth (Jan Kiepura’s wife), Prawy became acquainted with American musicals and music in general. After the end of the Second World War, Prawy returned to Vienna and brought with him the musical Kiss Me, Kate. It was received by the Viennese with great reservation as they feared the arrival of the American-style musical would spell the end of the traditional Viennese operetta. Nonetheless, Prawy succeeded, and was considered henceforth as the one who made German language musicals acceptable and popular.

== Contributions to opera ==
From 1955 on, Prawy served as dramaturg at the Vienna Volksoper, and from 1972 as chief-dramaturg at the Vienna State Opera. Between 1976 and 1982 Prawy was a professor at the Vienna College of Music (Wiener Musikhochschule, today Universität für Musik und darstellende Kunst Wien) and lecturer in the field of theater sciences at the University of Vienna. He also lectured as a visiting professor at numerous American and Japanese universities.

He became widely known because of a television and radio broadcast series produced by the ORF, where he introduced his viewers and listeners to the world of opera and operetta.

Prawy maintained close friendships with many prominent singers, composers and musicians, such as Leonard Bernstein and Robert Stolz. He was awarded numerous awards and honours in Austria and internationally, including honorary citizenship of Vienna and of Miami. Hardly anyone succeeded in picturing opera for his audience as impressively and fervently as he did, and thus Prawy became an institution as the National Opera Guide (Opernführer der Nation).

In his final years, Prawy was quite frank about his unique, and rather eccentric, method of archiving his enormous collection of theatre programmes, recordings, letters, photographs, personal notes, and similar loose sheets gathered over many decades. Although Prawy lived in a room at the Hotel Sacher, he invited journalists into the private apartment he was still keeping: it contained thousands of plastic shopping bags, each of which was carefully labelled so that he could readily access any information he needed.

On his 90th birthday in 2001, a special celebration was held for him in the Vienna State Opera. Prawy's death in 2003, of a lung embolism, was regarded as the passing of one of the last witnesses of an old time gone by and greatly mourned by the public.

== Publications ==
- Prawy, Marcel (1970), The Vienna Opera. London: Weidenfeld & Nicolson. ISBN 0-297-00134-5
- Prawy, Marcel (1982), Richard Wagner: Leben und Werk. Munich: Wilhelm Goldmann Verlag. ASIN B000EEJP7Q
- Prawy, Marcel (1991), Johann Strauss. Vienna: Ueberreuter ISBN 3-8000-3393-3
- Prawy, Marcel (2002), Marcel Prawy erzählt aus seinem Leben. ...und seine Vision der Oper des 21. Jahrhunderts. Vienna: Kremayr & Scheriau ISBN 3-218-00690-2
