= The Wonderful Years =

1980 film by Reiner Kunze

The Wonderful Years (German: Die wunderbaren Jahre) is a 1980 West German drama film directed by Reiner Kunze and starring Gabi Marr, Martin May, Dietrich Mattausch and Christine Wodetzky. It was based on Kunze's own book Die wunderbaren Jahre which was deeply critical of the system of government in East Germany. It won a Bavarian Film Award in the Best Screenplay category.

== Cast ==
- Gabi Marr ... Cornelia
- Martin May ... Stephan
- Dietrich Mattausch ... Herr Bergmann
- Christine Wodetzky ... Frau Bergmann
- Rolf Boysen ... Pfarrer
- Bärbel Deutschmann ... Eva
- Thomas Frontzek ... Michael
- Erich Schleyer ... Klaus
- Joane Prawitz ... Angelika
- Hans Helmut Dickow ... Direktor
- Eberhard Mondry ... Beckert
- Katharina Matz ... Lehrerin
- Carola Schwarz ... Ute Weber
- Harald Dietl ... Major
- Klaus Münster ... Brigadier
