= Die Männer vom K3 =

- Country of origin: Germany

Die Männer vom K3 is a German television series.
