= United States Navy Marine Mammal Program =

US Navy usage of dolphins and sealions

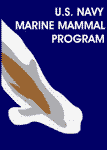

The U.S. Navy Marine Mammal Program (NMMP) is a program administered by the U.S. Navy which studies the military use of marine mammals - principally bottlenose dolphins and California sea lions - and trains animals to perform tasks such as ship and harbor protection, mine detection and clearance, and equipment recovery. The program is based in San Diego, California, where animals are housed and trained on an ongoing basis. NMMP animal teams have been deployed for use in combat zones, such as during the Vietnam War and the Iraq War.

The program has been dogged by controversy over the treatment of the animals and speculation as to the nature of its mission and training. This has been due at least in part to the secrecy of the program, which was de-classified in the early 1990s. Since the program's inception there have been ongoing animal welfare concerns and opposition to the use of marine mammals in military applications, even in non-combatant roles such as mine detection. The Navy cites external oversight, including ongoing monitoring, in defense of its animal care standards.

== History ==
The origins of the program date back to 1960, when a Pacific white-sided dolphin was acquired for hydrodynamic studies seeking to improve torpedo performance. The aim was to determine whether dolphins had a sophisticated drag-reduction system, but the technology of the day failed to demonstrate that dolphins have any unusual capabilities in this respect. This research has now resumed with the benefit of modern-day technology; among the possible drag-reducing mechanisms being studied for human use are skin compliance, biopolymers, and boundary-layer heating.

In 1962, the animals' intelligence, exceptional diving ability, and trainability led to the foundation of a new research program at Point Mugu, California, where a research facility was built on a sand spit between Mugu Lagoon and the ocean. The intention was to study the dolphins' senses and capabilities, such as their natural sonar and deep-diving physiology, and to determine how dolphins and sea lions might be used to perform useful tasks, such as searching for and marking objects in the water. A major accomplishment was the discovery that trained dolphins and sea lions could be reliably worked untethered in the open sea. In 1965, a Navy dolphin named Tuffy participated in the SEALAB II project off La Jolla, California, carrying tools and messages between the surface and the habitat 200 feet (60 m) below. Tuffy was also trained to locate and guide lost divers to safety.

In 1967 the NMMP was classified and has since evolved into a major black budget program. The Point Mugu facility and its personnel were relocated to Point Loma in San Diego, and placed under the control of the Space and Naval Warfare Systems Center San Diego. Additionally, a laboratory was established in Hawaii at the Marine Corps Air Station on Kāneʻohe Bay at the northern end of Mokapu Peninsula. However, in 1993, as the result of the Base Realignment and Closure process, the Hawaii lab was closed and the majority of the animals were moved to San Diego; some animals remained, as part of a program of joint research between the Navy and the University of Hawaiʻi.

== The program ==
The Navy Marine Mammal Program is based in San Diego, California, as part of SSC San Diego. The animals are trained in San Diego Bay; dolphin handlers can frequently be seen on the bay, where specialized small boats are used to transport dolphins between their pens and the training areas. Other locations are sometimes used for specific research, such as San Clemente Island in the Channel Islands of California, and torpedo test ranges in Seattle and Canada. The program's stated animal activities include protecting ports and Navy assets from swimmer attack, locating and assisting in the recovery of expensive exercise and training targets, and locating potentially dangerous sea mines.

There are five marine mammal teams, each trained for a specific type of mission. Each human-animal team is known in military jargon by a "mark" number (MK for short); the five teams are called "MK 4", "MK 5", "MK 6", "MK 7", and "MK 8". The MK 4, 7 and 8 teams use dolphins; MK 5 uses sea lions, and MK 6 uses both sea lions and dolphins. These teams can be deployed at 72 hours' notice by ship, aircraft, helicopter, and land vehicle to regional conflicts or staging areas around the world.

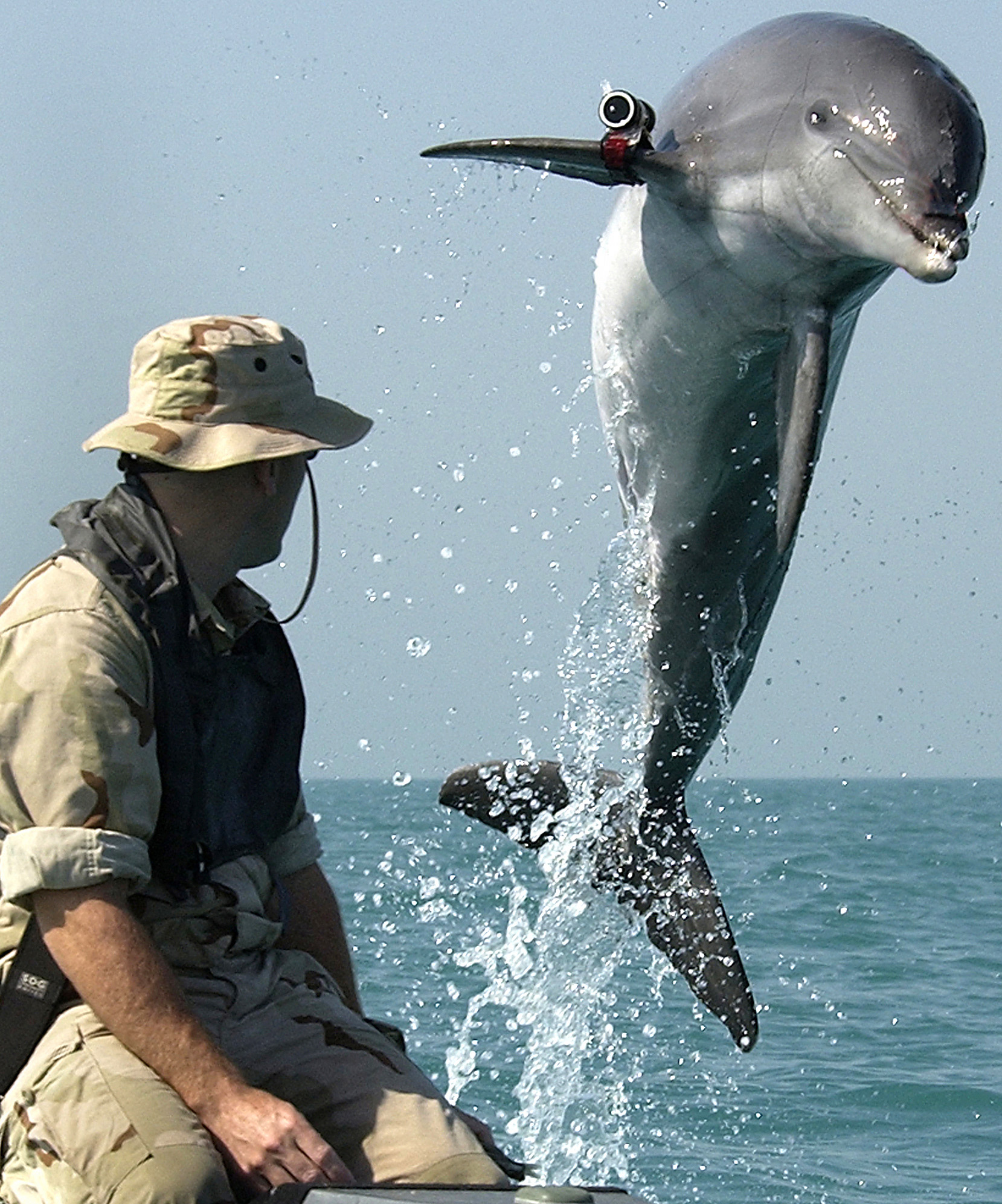
NMMP dolphins, such as the one pictured here wearing a locating pinger, performed mine clearance work in the Persian Gulf during the Iraq War.

=== Mine hunting ===
Three of the marine mammal teams are trained to detect enemy sea mines, which constitute a major hazard to U.S. Navy ships. MK 4 uses dolphins to detect and mark the location of tethered sea mines floating off the bottom, while MK 7 dolphins are trained to detect and mark the location of mines on the sea floor or buried in sediment. The MK 8 team is trained to swiftly identify safe corridors for the initial landing of troops ashore.

In operations, a dolphin awaits a cue from its handler before starting to search a specific area using its natural echolocation. The dolphin reports back to its handler, giving particular responses to communicate whether a target object is detected. If a mine-like target is detected, the handler sends the dolphin to mark the location of the object by releasing a buoy, so it can be avoided by Navy vessels or neutralized by Navy divers.

Mine-clearance dolphins were deployed to the Persian Gulf during the Iraq War in 2003. The Navy said these dolphins were effective in helping to detect more than 100 antiship mines and underwater booby traps from the port of Umm Qasr.

=== Force protection ===
MK 6 uses dolphins and sea lions as sentries to protect harbor installations and ships against unauthorized human swimmers. MK 6 was first operationally deployed with dolphins during the Vietnam War from 1965 to 1975 and in Bahrain from 1986 to 1988. When an enemy diver is detected by a dolphin, the dolphin approaches from behind and bumps a device into the back of the enemy's air tank. This device is attached to a buoy which then explodes, alerting the Navy personnel of the intruder. Sea lions carry a similar device in their mouth, but instead attach it by hand-cuffing one of the enemy's limbs. The animals depend on their superior underwater senses and swimming ability to defend against counterattacks.

=== Object recovery ===
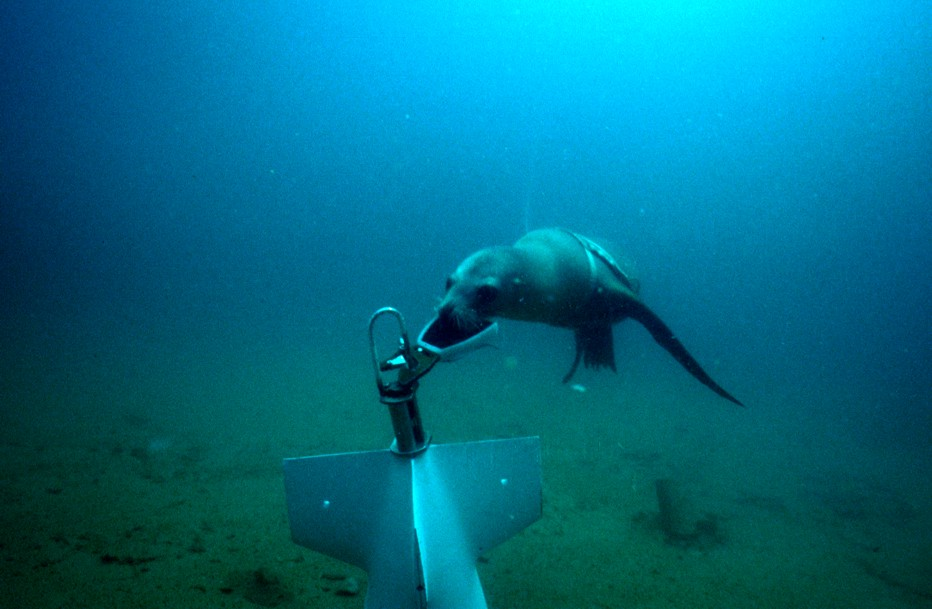
An NMMP sea lion attaches a recovery line to a piece of test equipment during training.

MK 5 is dedicated to the recovery of test equipment that is fired from ships or dropped from planes into the ocean; the team uses California sea lions to locate and attach recovery hardware to underwater objects such as practice mines. In this role they can out-perform human divers, who are restricted to short working times and limited repeat diving.

This team first demonstrated its capabilities when it recovered an ASROC (anti submarine rocket) from a depth of 180 feet (50 m) in November 1970. The team has trained in the recovery of dummy victims in a simulated airplane crash.

=== Attack missions ===
The Navy says that it has never trained its marine mammals for attack missions against people or ships. The Navy stated that since dolphins cannot discern the difference between enemy and friendly vessels, or divers and swimmers, this would be a haphazard means of warfare; instead, the animals are trained to detect all mines and swimmers in an area of concern, and to report back to their handlers, who then decide upon an appropriate response.

== Animals ==
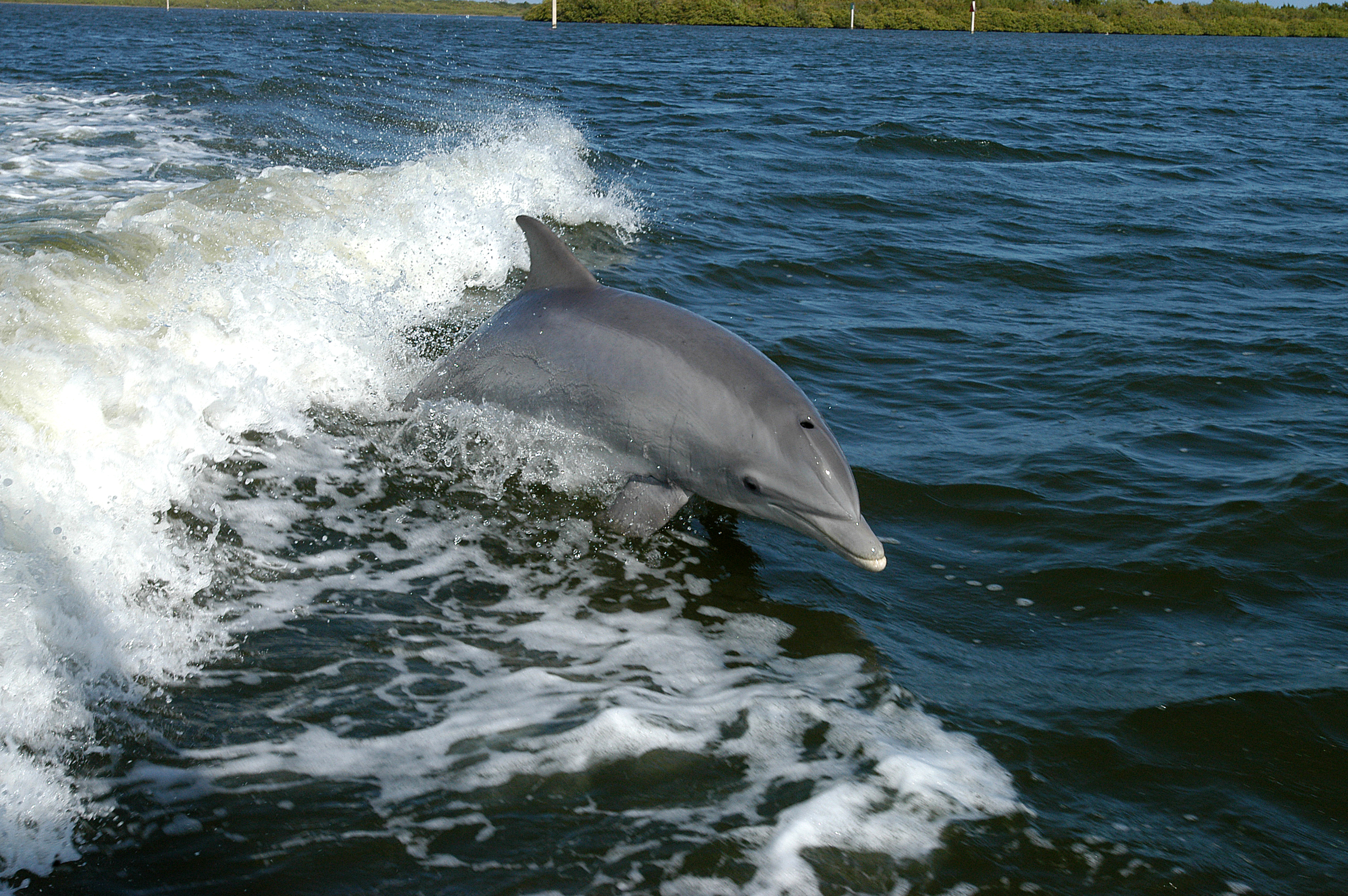
Bottlenose dolphins are among the species used by the Navy's Marine Mammal Program.

The Navy identifies the following animal species as having been used or studied by the program at various times:

Cetaceans:
- Beluga
- Bottlenose dolphin
- Common dolphin
- Dall's porpoise
- False killer whale
- Orca
- Pacific white-sided dolphin
- Pilot whale
- Risso's dolphin
- Rough-toothed dolphin
Pinnipeds:
- California sea lion
- Common seal
- Elephant seal
- Fur seals
- Grey seal
- Steller sea lion
Other:
- Birds
- Sharks
- Rays
- Sea turtles

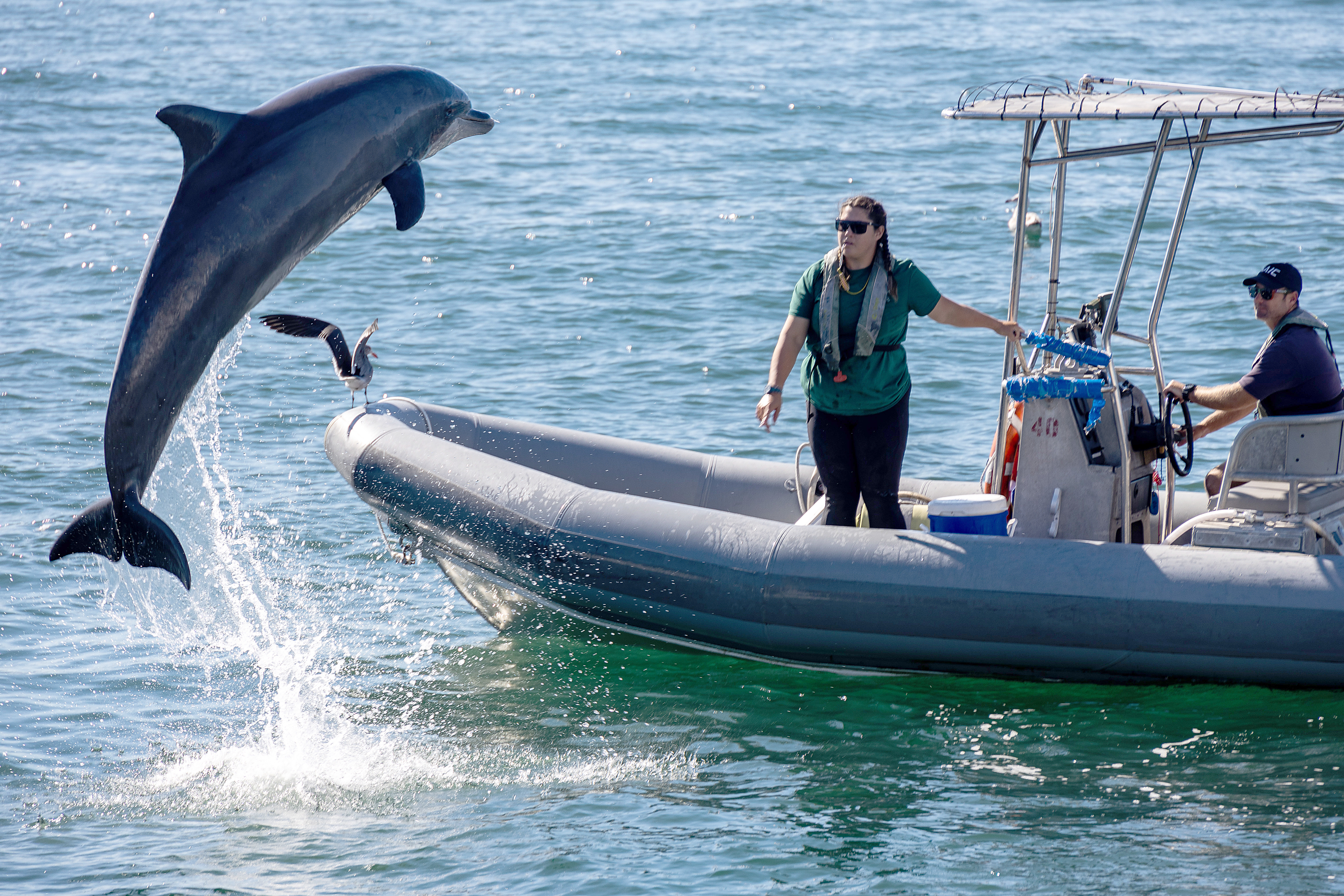
A mammal trainer of the NMMP demonstrates techniques with a bottlenose dolphin to local students during Fleet Week in San Diego, California, November 2023.

Bottlenose dolphins and California sea lions are the main animals used, and are kept at the base in San Diego. Dolphins have powerful biological sonar, unmatched by artificial sonar technology in detecting objects in the water column and on the sea floor. Sea lions lack this, but have very sensitive underwater directional hearing and exceptional vision in low-light conditions. Both of these species are trainable and capable of repetitive deep diving. As of the late 1990s, about 140 marine mammals were part of the program.

== Animal welfare ==
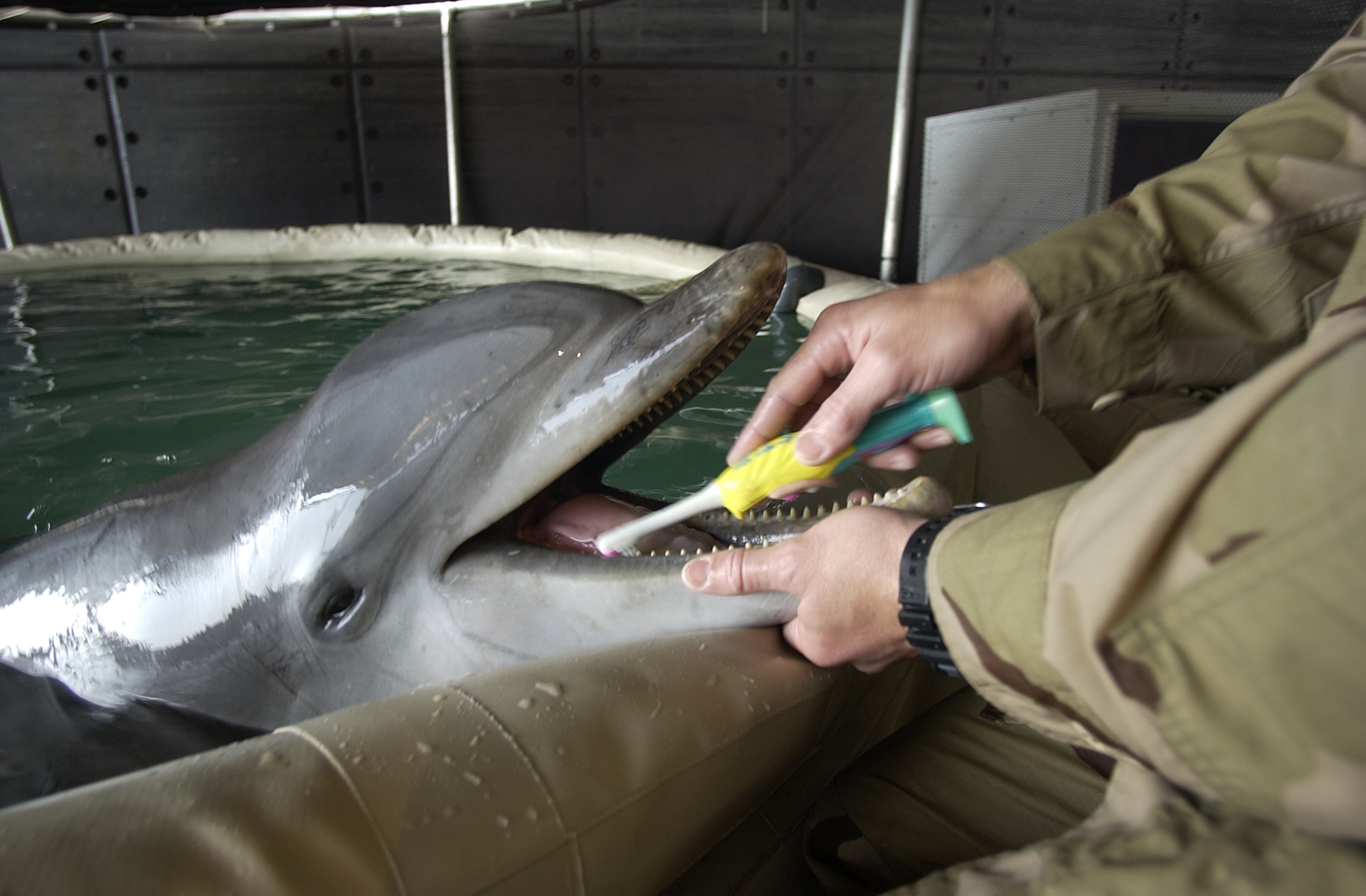
A mammal handler brushing the teeth of a bottlenose dolphin in the well deck aboard the USS Gunston Hall (LSD-44).

There has been controversy related to alleged mistreatment of animals in the program, and controversy continues over the use of marine mammals for military purposes.

The Navy's policy requires that only positive reinforcement techniques be used in the training of their animals, and that they be cared for in accordance with accepted standards. The NMMP says it complies strictly with United States Department of Defense requirements and federal laws regarding the proper care of the animals, including the Marine Mammal Protection Act and the Animal Welfare Act. The program is listed as an accredited institution by the Association for the Accreditation of Animal Laboratory Animal Care (AAALAC), whose voluntary accreditation program requires research programs to demonstrate that they meet standards of animal care beyond those required by law. As a standard targeted at laboratory animals, this accreditation requires a specific standard of general animal care, but does not set restrictions on the purposes for which the animals are used. The NMMP is also listed as a member of the Alliance of Marine Mammal Parks and Aquariums. The NMMP protocols for both care and research must be approved by an institutional animal care and use committee (IACUC). The NMMP IACUC includes non-NMMP researchers, veterinarians, and members of the community.

The use of marine mammals by the Navy, even in accordance with the Navy's stated policy, continues to meet opposition. Opponents cite the inevitable stresses involved in this type of training, which is contrary to the animals' natural lifestyles, particularly regarding their confinement when not training. There is continuing controversy over the use of anti-foraging devices, such as muzzles, which prevent the dolphins from foraging for food while working. The Navy states that this is to prevent their ingesting harmful objects, but opponents say that this is done to reinforce the handlers' control over the dolphins, which is based on food rewards. The re-integration and/or extended care of "retired" animals is also a concern.

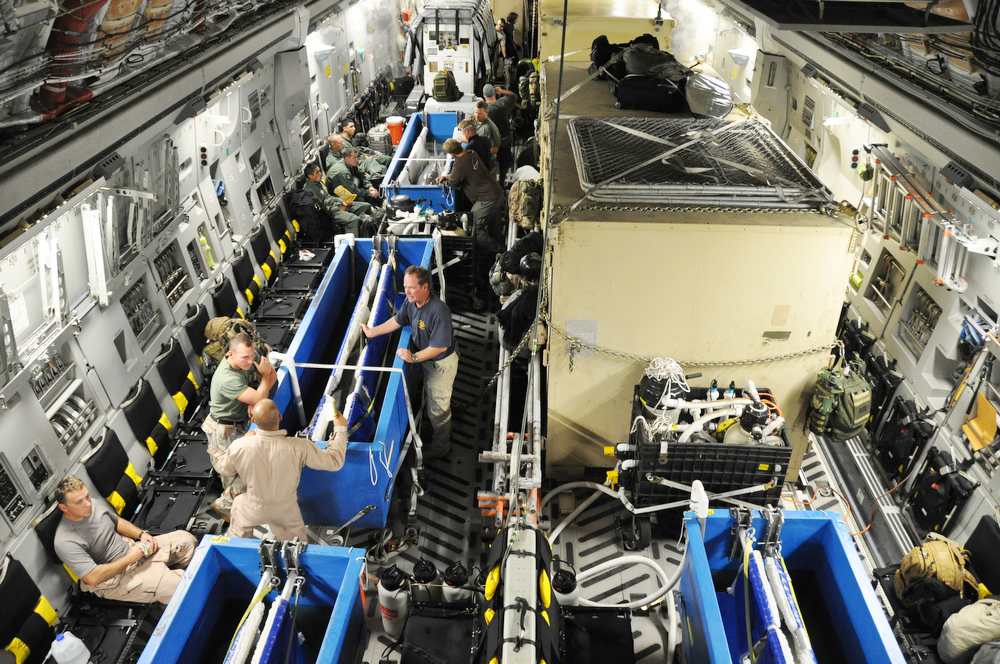
Personnel attending four dolphins during a flight aboard a C-17 Globemaster III.

The field use of the animals is also an issue for some critics, partly because of the stresses involved in transportation—particularly where dolphins are transported on dry carriers—as well as stresses arising from the sudden transplantation of the animals into an unfamiliar environment. Dolphins native to areas in which NMMP dolphins are introduced can also pose a threat, since they are known to defend their territory from intruders.

Other people raise the issue of hazards to the animals in their working environments. The risk of accidental detonation of a mine by an animal is of concern to some; the Navy maintains that the chances of this are minimal, because the animals are trained not to touch the mines, which in any case are specifically designed not to be detonated by marine animals. Another fear is that opposing forces, aware of mine-hunting dolphins in a given area, may shoot dolphins in the water, leading to deaths of both NMMP and native animals. Still more criticism comes from the argument that it is immoral or arrogant to involve animals in the conflicts of human beings.

== In the media ==
The NMMP has received much sensational coverage in the media, in some part because of the unusual nature of the program and the controversial concept of using intelligent marine mammals for military purposes. The NMMP was classified until the early 1990s, which also contributed to speculation about its true nature and even its proper title, with some referring to it as the Cetacean Intelligence Mission.

From time to time, stories have surfaced in the media claiming that military dolphins trained for attack missions, or even equipped with weaponry, have escaped and pose a danger to the public, but the Navy has stated that its dolphins have never been trained for any kind of attack mission against ships or people. During Hurricane Katrina in 2005, there were media reports that some of the Navy's dolphins, equipped with poison dart guns and trained to attack hostile swimmers in the water, escaped when their containment area in Lake Pontchartrain was breached, posing a threat to swimmers. However, the Navy reported that all of its dolphins were accounted for, and that its only dolphin training centre is in San Diego. During the hurricane, some dolphins did escape from the unrelated Marine Life Oceanarium in Gulfport, Mississippi, and were subsequently recaptured.

== In fiction ==
The concept of military dolphins has been explored in fiction, notably in the film The Day of the Dolphin (Mike Nichols, 1973) loosely based on the novel Un animal doué de la raison (A Sentient Animal, 1967) by Robert Merle. Vonda McIntyre published a short story titled "The End's Beginning" with this theme in 1976; it was later collected in the anthology Fireflood. The William Gibson short story "Johnny Mnemonic" and its film adaptation also featured a cyborg dolphin Navy veteran named "Jones" with a talent for decryption, and a heroin addiction. The TV series seaQuest DSV featured a trained dolphin, Darwin, as a member of the crew. Dolphins armed with sonar cannons were also portrayed in the popular video games Red Alert 2 and Red Alert 3. The writer David Brin's book Startide Rising is about genetically engineered dolphins crewing a spaceship. In the Star Trek: The Next Generation USS Enterprise (NCC-1701-D) Blueprints by Rick Sternbach there are multiple cetacean operations locations on decks 13 & 14.

== See also ==
- Military dolphin
- Military animals
- Cetacean intelligence
- Vaquita#Recovery efforts, US Navy dolphins are being deployed to locate the remaining vaquitas for captive breeding
