= Leslie Charleson =

American actress (1945–2025)

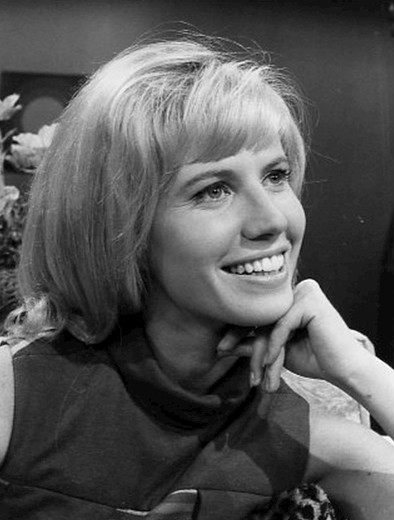
- Charleson in 1967
- Born: Leslie Ann Charleson; February 22, 1945; Kansas City, Missouri, U.S.
- Died: January 12, 2025 (aged 79); Los Angeles, California, U.S.
- Occupation: Actress
- Years active: 1964–2025
- Known for: Monica Quartermaine in General Hospital
- Spouse: Bill Demms (m. 1989; div. 1991)

Leslie Ann Charleson (February 22, 1945 – January 12, 2025) was an American actress, best known for playing the role of Monica Quartermaine on the ABC daytime soap opera General Hospital for 46 years.

At the time of her death in January 2025, her tenure in the role was one of the longest in American soap operas, with The New York Times calling her "one of the most enduring cast members in daytime television".

== Early years ==
Charleson was born in Kansas City, Missouri, on February 22, 1945. Her mother, Georgia Nels Youngson, and her biological father, Charles Carlton Coffin Jr, separated shortly after she was born. Charleson didn't meet her father until she was 18 and grew up with her mother and maternal grandparents in Evanston, Illinois for the first seven years of her life. Her mother would marry Dave Charleson in 1951.

Her first foray into acting came when she starred alongside her mother in a car commercial. Speaking on the talk show Something to Offer, Charleson said her role involved pretending to be asleep in the backseat of the vehicle. "I just remember my mother turning around and saying with a big smile, 'If you don't close your eyes, Leslie, you're never going to see 8 years old. Do it right now.'" She went on to act throughout her teenage years before going on to study theater at Bennett College in Milbrook, New York where she would act in comedic and dramatic roles in plays including The Man Who Came to Dinner.

== Career ==
Her soap career began on the short-lived ABC daytime soap opera A Flame in the Wind in 1964 with the role of Pam. Charleson and her stepsister Kate, also an actress, moved to New York City to launch their acting careers. Joseph Hardy, who would go on to become an executive producer of General Hospital, hired Charleson for a recurring role on the half-hour soap opera.

In 1966 she joined the cast of As the World Turns as Alice Whipple, the stepdaughter of established character Don Hughes. In 1968, she played the role of a doctor's daughter in The Wild Wild West in the episode "The Night of Fire and Brimstone".

From 1967 to 1970, she starred on the CBS soap opera Love Is a Many Splendored Thing. She played the role of Iris Donnelly Garrison. Her character was a part of a highly popular love triangle with David Birney and Donna Mills. Charleson recorded more than 1,400 episodes of the series over her three-year run.

Charleson guest-starred on many series from 1970 to 1977, including Adam-12; Emergency!; Ironside; Mannix; Marcus Welby, M.D.; Happy Days; Cannon; The Streets of San Francisco; and The Rockford Files. She had a supporting role in the 1973 science-fiction film The Day of the Dolphin and co-starred opposite Shelley Winters in the television thriller Revenge! (1971). Charleson also had leading roles in a number of unsuccessful television pilots, most notable 1975 sitcom pilot Guess Who’s Coming to Dinner.

=== General Hospital ===
Charleson is perhaps best remembered for her role as cardiologist Monica Quartermaine in the ABC soap opera General Hospital which she played continuously from August 17, 1977, to December 21, 2023. NPR described the character as a "razor-sharp cardiologist with an embattled personal life, full of marriage, divorce, heartbreak and affair" and the Los Angeles Times called her a "cardiologist-turned-mob enforcer". People said Monica "filled the bad-girl archetype on the show" upon her introduction.

Fred Silverman, then president of ABC, asked her to join the series, which at that time was near the bottom of the ratings and near cancellation. Charleson was replacing Patsy Rahn in the role and signed a two-year contract. Her first day of filming coincided with the death of Elvis Presley, of whom she was a fan. "I was crying all the way down to the studio, only to be told there was a strike going on and 'had I brought in my own makeup and my own wardrobe?' and nobody liked me because they had fired the other girl, rather rudely I understand." Her first scene was with John Beradino, who played Steve Hardy.

Monica's storylines revolved around marriage to Alan Quartermaine (Stuart Damon), which involved affairs, fights, and many break-ups. “We’d do real slaps,” Charleson once said. “Stuart was always afraid I’d take his eye out. I would fake a slap in dress rehearsal, but when we went to tape it, all that went out the window!” Charleson said her most significant storyline was Monica's breast cancer battle. "This was one of the first times the show got into [a medical story in such depth] - we stopped freezing the town or Lassa Fever and all of that. It was important and difficult and rewarding, because we all did our homework. I really wanted to portray it in the most honest, realistic way we could." She later attended Susan G. Komen for the Cure fundraiser events and women would share their own experiences. "I also felt the show did a great service showing how her husband, Alan, and the rest of Monica’s family and friends dealt with her battle. It was an important story and knowing that any part of my performance helped viewers was just so gratifying."

On August 24, 2010, it was announced that Charleson was being demoted to recurring status. Charleson was the longest-serving cast member of General Hospital. Incoming General Hospital executive producer Garin Wolf brought Monica back to the front burner of the show in 2011.

Charleson was outspoken when it came to bosses demoting Anna Lee in 2003, arguing producer Wendy Riche promised Lee a "lifetime contract". "The woman was in her 80s. And then when the new powers-that-be took over they fired her, and it broke her heart. It was not necessary." She was also critical of the show firing Stuart Damon in December 2006 on the cusp of their 30th anniversary performing together. "The timing leaves me very discouraged about the way soaps are going, the total disregard for history and the blatant disregard for the veterans. Stuart is very sad. This has been his home away from home. He has his good days and bad."

Charleson continued playing the role of Monica until March 15, 2022, when General Hospital temporarily recast the role for one episode. She remained off-screen until December 2023, when she resumed her role for a handful of episodes, albeit in a wheelchair. In between these appearances, Charleson occasionally recorded audio to be used on the show when characters and Monica could be heard over the phone, such as in the tribute episode to Sonya Eddy. Following on from what would be her final appearances in 2023, reports circulated that Charleson was unlikely to "ever return" to the show due to ongoing health issues. Charleson was due to appear in an April 1 episode in which the Dr. Monica Quartermaine Cardiac Care Center is opened, but was unable to return due to her declining health.

Following Charleson's death in 2025, General Hospital wrote Monica out of the show as having died off-screen and aired a series of tribute episodes in September of that same year. The show utilised archive footage in several episodes to pay tribute to the actress' many years on the programme. They also introduced Ronnie Bard (Erika Slezak), as Monica's long-lost sister.

For her role, Charleson received four Daytime Emmy Award for Outstanding Lead Actress in a Drama Series nominations: in 1980, 1982, 1983 and 1995. During her General Hospital years, Charleson starred alongside Deidre Hall and Colleen Zenk in the 1993 made-for-television movie Woman on the Ledge. She also guest-starred on sitcoms Dharma & Greg in 2001 and Friends in 2004.

== Personal life ==
Charleson married businessman Bill Demms in Rowayton, Connecticut, on April 1, 1989 but the couple divorced in 1991. The couple had no children.

Her stepsister Kate died by suicide on October 12, 1996 at the age of 43. After coming home from set to check her phone messages, Charleson was prompted to drive to her sister's Los Angeles apartment where she discovered Kate's body. Charleson later shared that Kate suffered from Bipolar disorder and that she had once bailed her out of jail. Charleson also has a brother, Malcolm.

Charleson had a lifelong interest in horses and owned two towards the end of her life. She also owned a tortoise and a dog, Riley Rose. In 2018 she injured her leg walking her dog and the following year fractured her hand rescuing her tortoise from a hillside.

=== Death ===
Charleson died in Los Angeles on January 12, 2025, at the age of 79. According to Variety, she had experienced "several falls", which caused problems with her mobility, and had been hospitalized from one of them the week before her death. Her death certificate, publicly reported in February 2025, concluded that the immediate cause of death was sequelae of blunt head trauma, which was the result of a previous head injury.

== Filmography ==
=== Film ===
Year	Title	Role	Notes	Ref.
1968	A Lovely Way to Die	Julie	Crime neo noir directed by David Lowell Rich; Uncredited	
1973	The Day of the Dolphin	Maryanne	Science fiction thriller film directed by Mike Nichols; Based on novel of the same name by Robert Merle	
1977	Cheering Section	Locker Girl #2	Comedy film co-written and directed by Harry Kerwin	
2006	The Return of the Muskrats	Waitress	Short film directed & written by Andrew Mudge	

=== Television ===
Year	Title	Role	Notes	Ref.
1964	A Flame in the Wind	Pam	Recurring role	
1966	As the World Turns	Alice Whipple	Series regular	
1967	N.Y.P.D.	Ginger	Episode: "Cruise to Oblivion"	
1968	The Wild Wild West	Dooley Sloan	Episode: "The Night of Fire and Brimstone"	
1967–1970	Love Is a Many Splendored Thing	Iris Donnelly Garrison	Series regular	
1970	Mannix	Marge Lavor	Episode 16: "A Chance at the Roses"	
1971	Revenge!	Nancy Grover	Made-for-TV movie (ABC) directed by Jud Taylor	
1972	Adam-12	Kathy Royal	Episode: "The Princess and the Pig"	
1972	O'Hara, U.S. Treasury	Helga Kuyper	Episode: "Operation: Deathwatch"	
1972	Marcus Welby, M.D.	Lisa Kenny	Episode: "Just a Little Courage"	
1972	Search	Nancy Kubica	Episode: "Live Men Tell Tales"	
1972	The Rookies	Anne Dawson	Episode: "The Good Die Young"	
1972	Emergency!	Christy Todd	Episode: "Women"	
1972	Cannon	Katherine 'Kate' Machen	Episode: "Sky Above, Death Below"	
1972	Medical Center	Patti	Episode: "Gladiator"	
1973	Ironside	Nicky Jameson	Episode: "A Special Person"	
1973	The F.B.I.	Ginny Wyatt	Episode: "The Loper Gambit"	
1973	Marcus Welby, M.D.	Alice Henley	Episode: "The Circles of Shame"	
1973	Owen Marshall: Counselor at Law	Edie Nolan	Episode: "They've Got to Blame Somebody"	
1974	Another April	April Weston Moss	Pilot episode	
1974	Cannon	Joan Stevens	Episode: "The Sounds of Silence"	
1974	The Streets of San Francisco	Joanna Randolph Reed	Episode: "Death and the Favored Few"	
1975	Kung Fu	Amy Starbuck	Episode: "One Step to Darkness"	
1975	Happy Days	Mrs. Dorothy Kimber	Episode: "Get a Job"	
1975	Caribe	Claire Grune	Episode: "Murder in Paradise"	
1975	Guess Who's Coming to Dinner	Joanna Prentiss	Pilot episode	
1975	Medical Story	Susan Stewart	Episode: "The God Syndrome"	
1975	Cannon	Susan Baylor	Episode: "The Man Who Died Twice"	
1975	Barnaby Jones	Victoria Norris	Episode: "Honeymoon with Death"	
1976	The Streets of San Francisco	Donna Sinclair	Episode: "Underground"	
1976	Most Wanted	Lee Herrick	Pilot episode	
1976	Bert D'Angelo/Superstar	Gail	Episode: "A Concerned Citizen"	
1976	Baa Baa Black Sheep	Captain Anne Schaeffer	Episode: "Love and War"	
1977	McMillan & Wife	Ginny Lindauer	Episode: "Coffee, Tea, or Cyanide?"	
1977	The Rockford Files	Patsy Fossler	Episodes: "To Protect and Serve: Part 1" and "To Protect and Serve: Part 2"	
1977–2023	General Hospital	Monica Quartermaine	Series regular (1977–2010), recurring cast (2010–2023); Nominated — Daytime Emmy Award for Outstanding Lead Actress in a Drama Series (1980, 1982–83, 1995); Nominated — Soap Opera Digest Award for Outstanding Lead Actress in a Daytime Drama (1986, 1988, 1990); Nominated — Soap Opera Digest Award for Outstanding Supporting Actress (1993)	
1993	Woman on the Ledge	Rachel	Made-for-TV movie (NBC) directed by Chris Thomson	
1997	Diagnosis: Murder	Herself	Episode: "Physician, Murder Thyself"	
1997–2000	Port Charles	Monica Quartermaine	Recurring role	
2001	Dharma & Greg	Katherine	Episode: "Dharma Does Dallas"	
2004	Friends	Herself	Episode: "The One Where the Stripper Cries"	
2008	General Hospital: Night Shift	Monica Quartermaine	Episodes: "Truth and Consequences" and "Past and Presence: Part 2"	
