= Collection (publishing) =

Set of books published by the same publisher

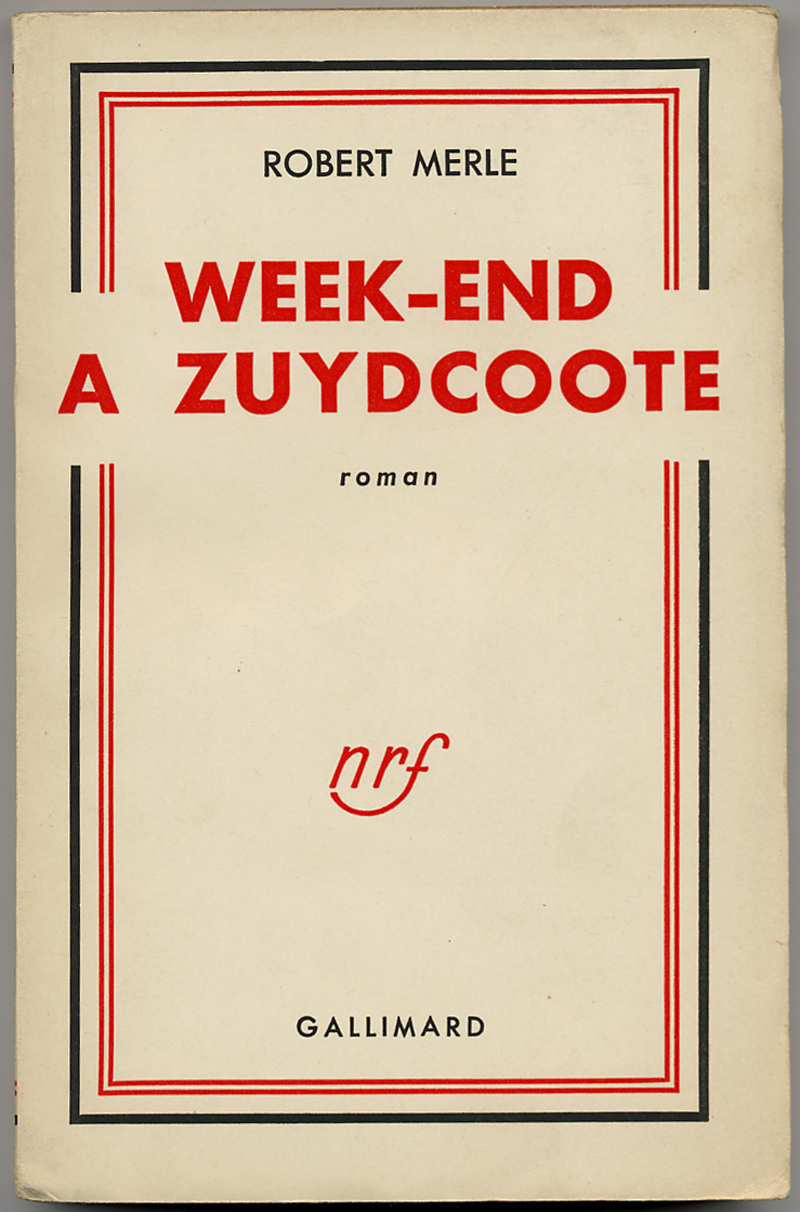
Week-end à Zuydcoote by Robert Merle

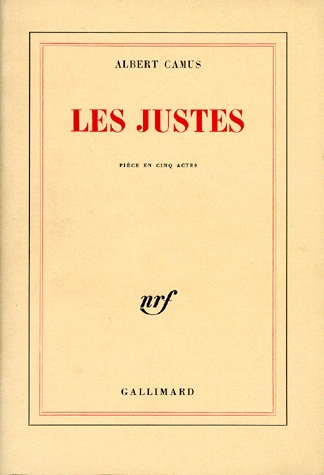
Les Justes by Albert Camus

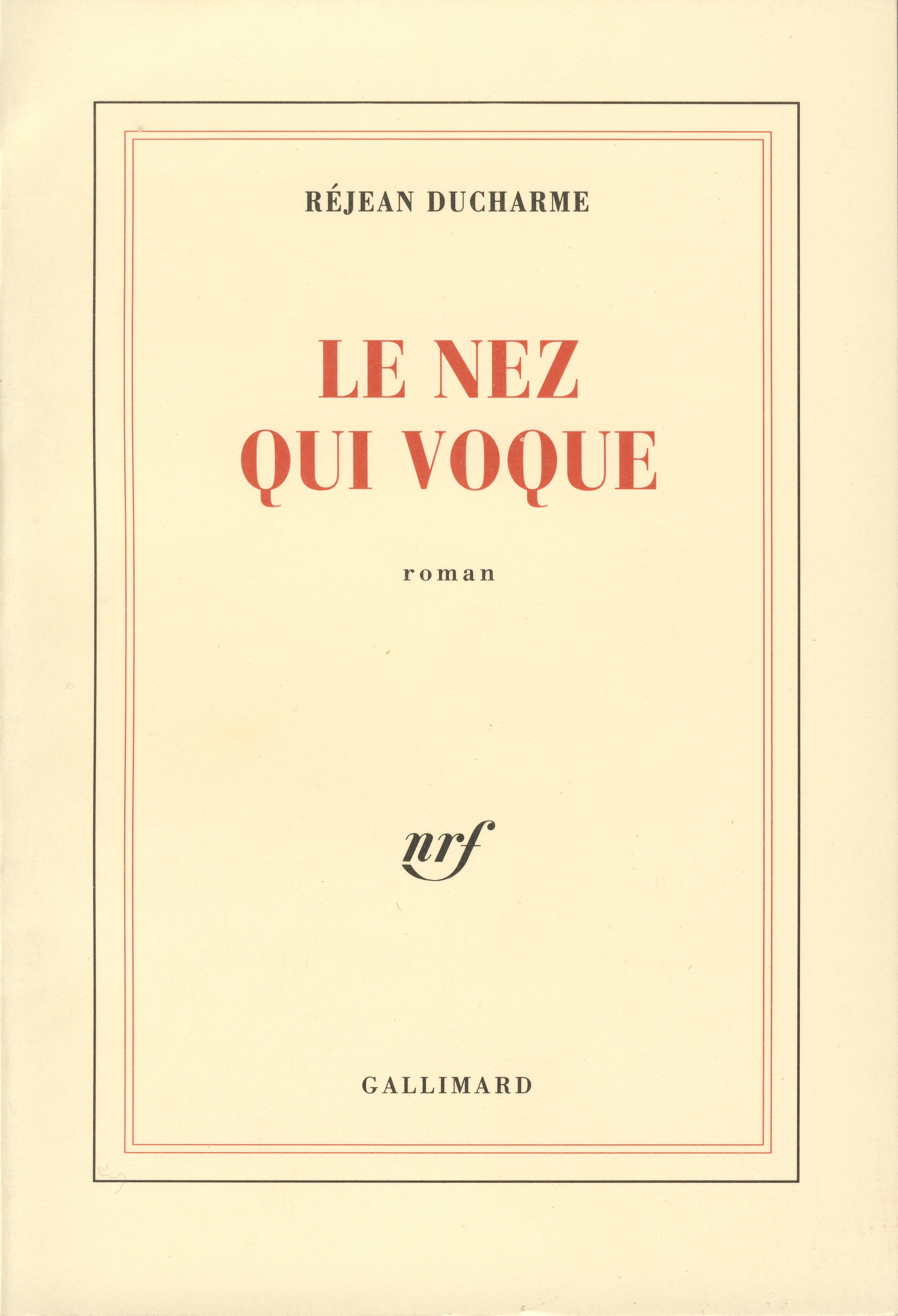
Le Nez qui voque by Réjean Ducharme

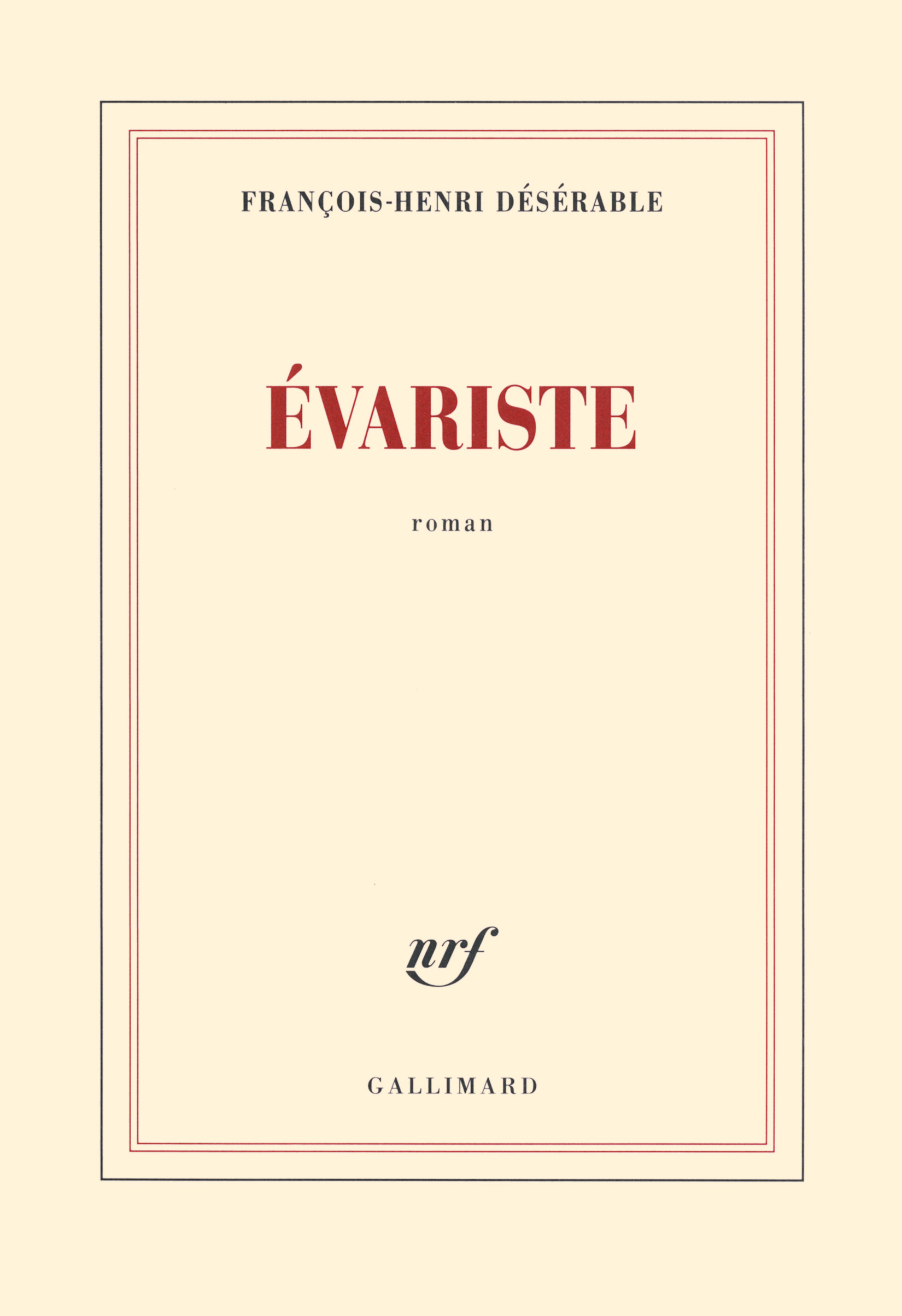
Évariste by François-Henri Désérable

Four titles from the "Collection Blanche" published by Éditions Gallimard.

In the field of book publishing, a collection or, more precisely, editorial collection (French: collection éditoriale; Spanish: colección editorial; Italian: collana editoriale; Portuguese: coleção de livros, lit. 'collection of books'), is a set of books published by the same publisher, usually written by various authors, each book with its own title, but all grouped under the same collective title. The collective title is the title of the collection and must be mentioned on each book.

The books that make up an editorial collection can be published in a specific order or not. When each volume in the collection has a serial number, it is called a numbered collection.

A collection generally uses distinctive, common formats and features. The title of a collection can be accompanied by the term "series" or its equivalents in other languages, such as in the English-speaking world; for example, the "Bibliothèque de la Pléiade", "Découvertes Gallimard" and "Que sais-je?" are all termed "book series" instead of collections. Conversely, Thames & Hudson's "World of Art" series was published as a collection in France and Spain.

== Brief history ==
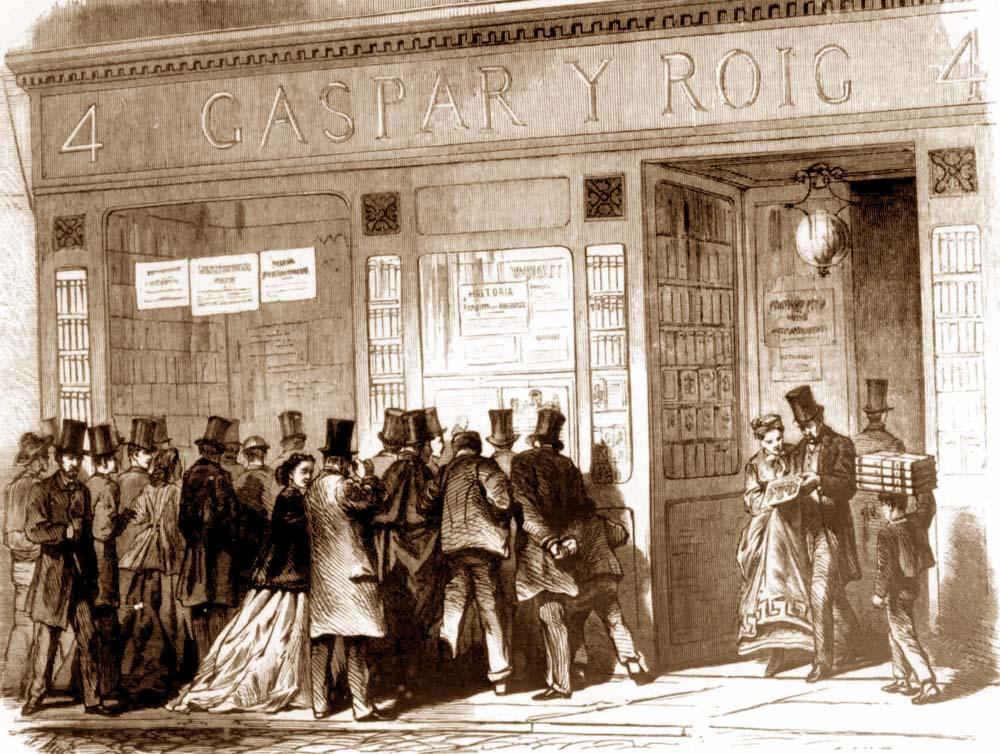
The Spanish publisher Gaspar y Roig's bookshop in 19th-century Madrid, when El Museo Universal is displayed in its shop window.

In France, the concept of "collection" was invented by Louis Hachette, a 19th-century publisher, under the name bibliothèque, which means "library".

In 19th- and early 20th-century Spain, literary collections such as "Biblioteca de Autores Españoles", "Biblioteca Mignon", "El Libro Popular" and "La Novela Corta" increased in popularity. The "Biblioteca ilustrada de Gaspar y Roig", created in 1851 in Madrid, is notable for its encyclopaedia-like contents. It contains not only literary works (popular novels of the 19th century), but also reference work (dictionary): Comte de Buffon's Histoire Naturelle, Cesare Cantù's Storia Universale, Juan de Mariana's Historia general de España, as well as the Bible in Spanish (Biblia de Scío).

In Italy, the first editorial collection was the "Collana historica" (or "Collana historica de' Greci"), which included vulgarised works of twelve Greek historians, edited by the 16th-century humanist Tommaso Porcacchi and printed in Venice by Gabriele Giolito de' Ferrari from 1563 to 1585. The use of collana in the title is metaphorical: each work is a "ring" or "joy" of the collana (collana originally means "necklace").

In Portugal, the "Colecção Argonauta"—a collection of science fiction novels and short stories—appeared in 1953. The Portuguese publisher, Livros do Brasil, aimed to pioneer the popularization of the genre in the country.

In Brazil, the "boom of collections" took place in a context of impressive growth of the publishing market. Though the publication of collections was still thin on the ground in the 1920s, it would eventually rise and spread in the 30s.

In Romania, the "Biblioteca pentru toți" (lit. 'Everyone's Library'), a pocket-sized collection, was created by the folklorist Dumitru Stăncescu in 1895.

== Definition ==
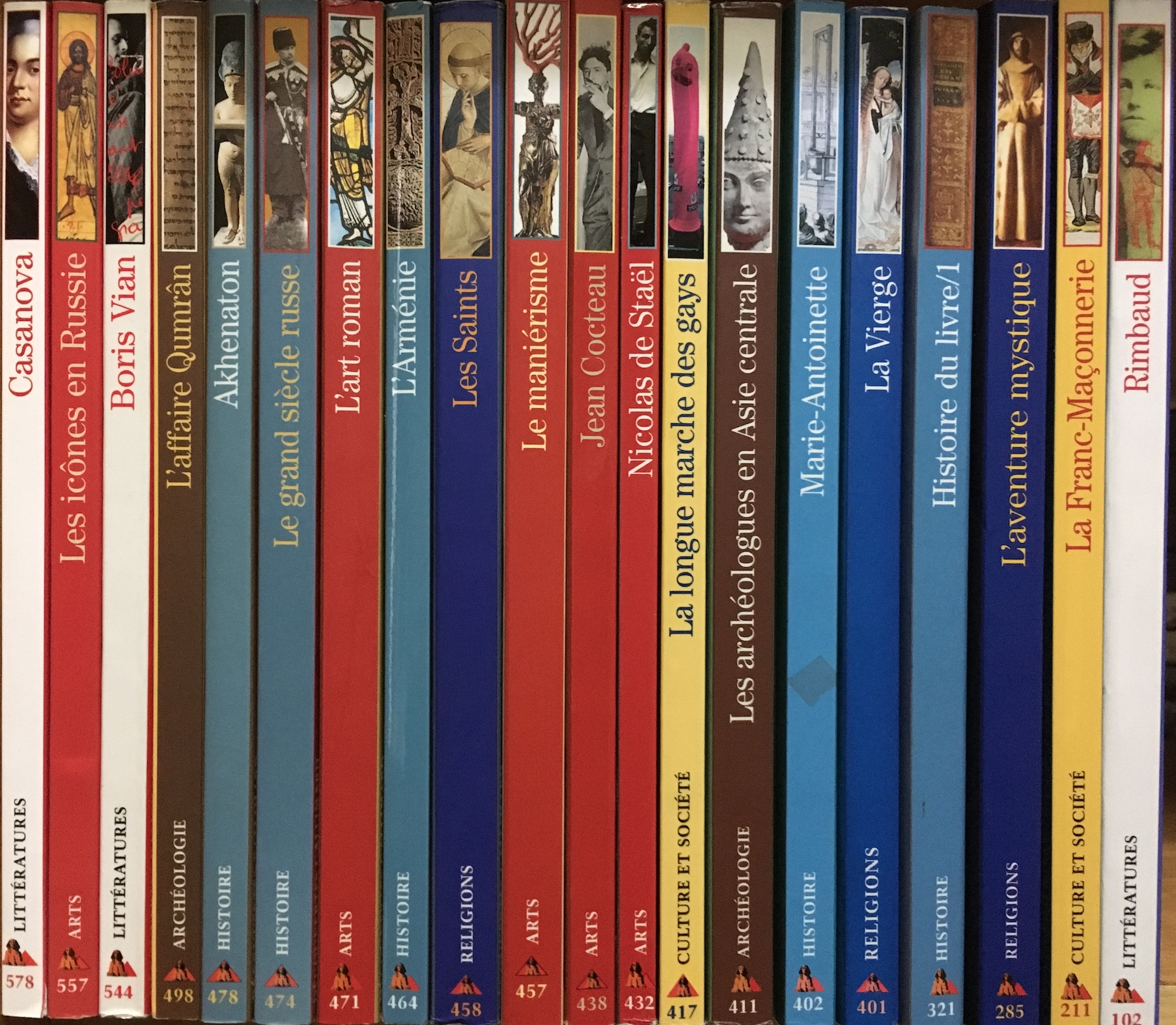
"Découvertes Gallimard", a collection of monographs published like art books.

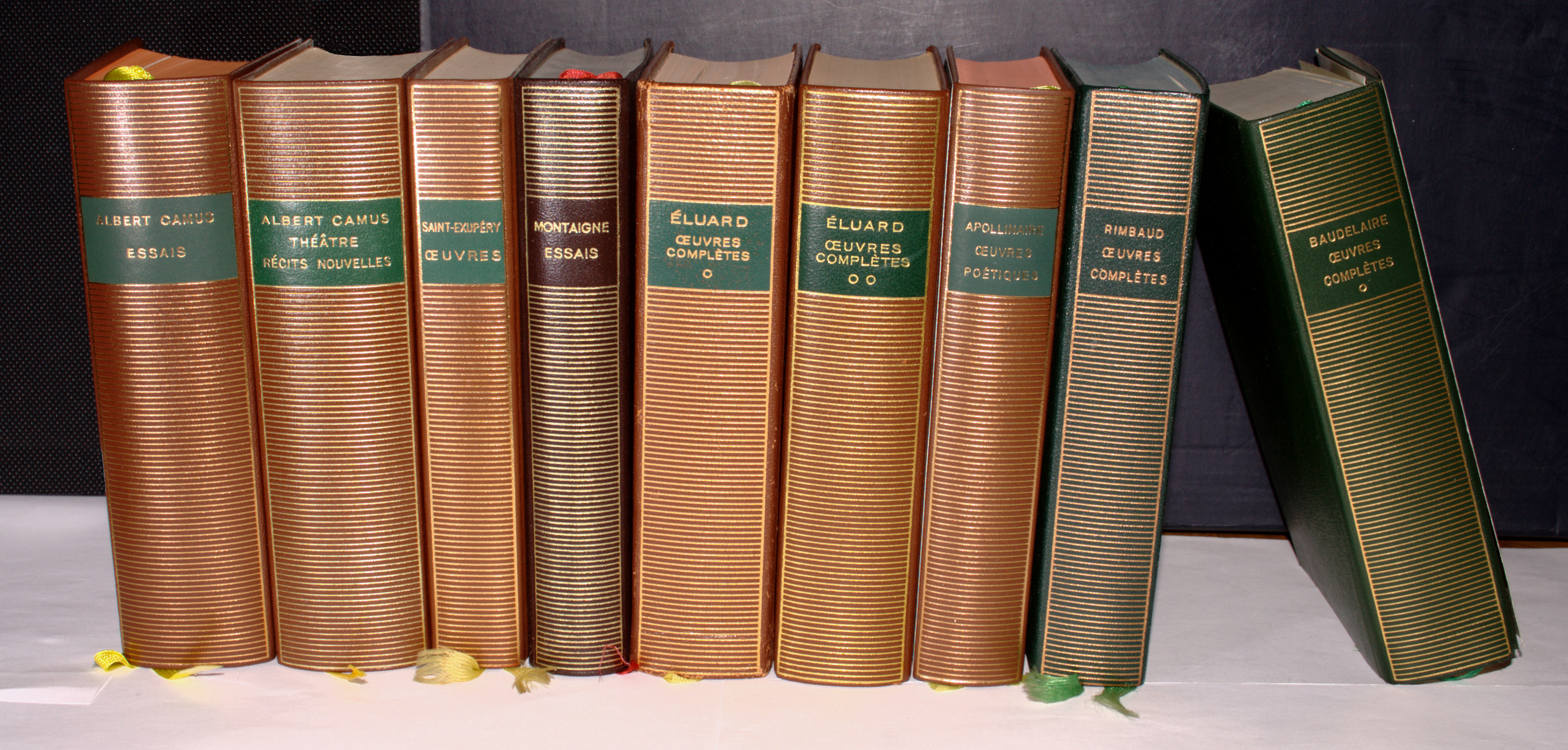
The celebrated collection "Bibliothèque de la Pléiade".

A collection is characterized by uniformity in presentation as well as a certain affinity of content. Each book may use the same dimension, type of cover, and type of spine; further, the same colours may be used on the cover (in the case of the publishers Dalloz and Litec), though sometimes different colours or details are used in a systematic manner (collection "Bibliothèques" of the Éditions du Cercle de la librairie). Generally, the grammage of paper for each collection is always the same, as well as the typography applied, the cover design and page layout (collection "Découvertes Gallimard"). Certain collections also standardise the number of pages; for example, the books in the collection "Que sais-je?" each have 128 pages. A collection can be further subdivided into several series or sub-collections; for example, the collection "Découvertes Gallimard" contains seven series as well as several sub-collections.

The volumes of a collection are also characterized by a defined content or style. Thus, a literary collection will have, for example, novels in their original language, translated works, works with literary value of national authors, or regroup texts of a certain subject or a certain genre. In terms of reference works, there are collections of school or university textbooks, collections of research works and of practical books. Some collections are distinguished by a very strong orientation towards specialisation, such as collections on the study of Egyptology, on jurisprudence, on pharmacy, astronomy. Others are distinguished by an encyclopaedic tendency (in the case of "Découvertes Gallimard"). Some collections include both literary texts and reference texts, such as "Le Livre de Poche", while others are specialised in classic books.

Marketing is a major consideration for publishers of collections. Given that a collection is characterized by a visual unity, with successive editions and with the help of promotion, successful marketing can even lead to a degree of fidelity of the public that ultimately supports the collection's commercial success. In many publishing houses, the tasks of selection of works and programming in general fall under the orbit of the "director of collection".

Certain collections have gained sufficient fame, that they are sometimes considered (or can be considered) to be independent publishing houses, such is the case with the "Bibliothèque de la Pléiade" edited by Éditions Gallimard.

== Collection and series ==
Although similar in many ways, editorial collections and book series differ in that the books in a collection do not necessarily have a specific order, or a common subject, but rather maintain a certain affinity in the content across books (collections on art, on religion, or on science, for example), as well as in the format, spine and layout, grammage, number of pages and style of typeface. A collection can include one or more sub-collections or series (as in the case of Grupo Anaya's "Biblioteca Básica de Historia", and Gallimard's "Découvertes"). Most commonly, a publisher will create a collection according to its editorial line or for commercial reasons. In contrast, books in a series generally have a common subject, character, or universe; in other words, a book series is a set of volumes that are related to each other by certain thematic element, and volumes may or may not have a specific order within that series. A book series may also include one or more sub-series.

== See also ==
- Serial (publishing)
- Monographic series
- Books in Brazil
- Books in France
- Books in Italy
- Books in Spain
