= Among the Sheep =

Ukrainian comic book series

Publication information
- Publisher: Vovkulaka
- Format: ongoing
- Publication date: 2016 - present
- No. of issues: 4

Creative team
- Written by: Olexander Koreshkov
- Artist: Olexander Koreshkov

Among the Sheep (Ukrainian: «Серед овець») is a 2016 comic book ongoing series, written by Olexander Koreshkov. The first issue was published in 2016.

According to the Gazeta.ua, the comic book Among the Sheep is among the top 10 most popular Ukrainian comics.

== Synopsis ==
What is the "fear of being human"? What does it mean to "see injustice and remain silent"? When do we turn into our executioners?
You avoid such difficult questions to the last. So maybe it would be better to disperse them on the example of one dog living in a world of total fear, lies and greed? Lives like a sheep among sheep...

== Editions ==
#	Title	Date of publication	Format	Cover	Sizes	Pages	ISBN
Among the Sheep (2016-)
1	Issue #1	May 5, 2016	one-shot	soft cover	170х260 mm	32	ISBN 978-966-97753-0-6
2	Issue #2	May 6, 2017	one-shot	soft cover	170х260 mm	32	ISBN 978-966-97753-1-3
3	Issue #3	March 24, 2018	one-shot	soft cover	170х260 mm	56	ISBN 978-966-97753-2-0
4	Issue #4	June 30, 2020	one-shot	soft cover	170х260 mm	44	ISBN 978-617-7782-09-3
Collected editions
1	Among the Sheep. Book 1	November 7, 2019	collection	TPB	170х260 mm	128	ISBN 978-617-7782-05-5
