= Hans Korte =

German actor (1929–2016)

- Born: 8 April 1929; Bochum, Westphalia, Prussia, Germany
- Died: 25 September 2016 (aged 87); Munich, Bavaria, Germany
- Occupation(s): Stage actor, film actor, Voice actor, Director

Hans Korte (8 April 1929 – 25 September 2016) was a German actor.

== Filmography ==
- Yesterday Girl (1966), as The Judge
- Frank V (1967, TV Movie), as Egli
- Der Röhm-Putsch (1967, TV Movie), as Ernst Röhm
- The Females (1970), as Kommissar
- Nachbarn sind zum Ärgern da (1970), as Max Hirnbiss
- The Captain (1971), as Herbert Prittel, purser
- Einmal im Leben – Geschichte eines Eigenheims (1972, TV miniseries), as Masch
- Betragen ungenügend! (1972), as Prof. Heinzerling
- Don't Get Angry (1972), as Paul Wegmann
- Only the Wind Knows the Answer (1974), as Notar Ribeyrolles (voice, uncredited)
- Everyone Dies Alone (1976), as SS Obergruppenführer Prall
- Derrick (1976-1993, TV Series), as Röder / Anwalt / Dr. Trabuhr / Robert Linder / Professor Balthaus / Herr Kwien / Ewald Malenke
- Death is My Trade (1977), as Heinrich Himmler
- Der Friede von Locarno (1978, TV Movie), as Gustav Stresemann
- Doctor Faustus (1982), as Professor Kumpf
- Der Vater eines Mörders (1985, TV Movie, based on The Father of a Murderer), as The father of Heinrich Himmler
- Der Schatz im Niemandsland (1987, TV Series), as Grandfather Erfan
- Lorentz & Söhne (1988, TV Series), as Guy Lorentz
- Spider's Web (1989), as Hugenberg
- Ende der Unschuld (1991, TV Movie), as Professor Erich Schumann
- Keep on Running (1991), as Dr. Dörner
- The Great Bellheim (1993, TV Mini-Series), as Max Reuther
- Katrin ist die Beste (1997, TV Series), as Friedrich
- The King of St. Pauli (1998, TV Series), as Walter 'Fett-Daumen' Graf
- Samt und Seide (2002–2005, TV series), as August Meyerbeer
