= Death Is My Trade =

1952 biographical novel by Robert Merle

- First UK edition, 1954
- Author: Robert Merle
- Original title: La mort est mon métier
- Language: French
- Subject: The Holocaust
- Genre: Speculative fiction
- Set in: Auschwitz
- Publisher: Éditions Gallimard
- Publication date: 1952
- Publication place: Paris
- English publication date: 1954
- Pages: 413

Death Is My Trade (French: La mort est mon métier) a 1952 biographical novel by Robert Merle. The protagonist, Rudolf Lang, was closely based on the real Rudolf Höß, commandant of the concentration camp of Auschwitz.

== Summary ==
The story begins in 1913, when Lang is 13 years old. His parents give him a harsh Catholic education, to which he reacts badly. His unstable father, with whom the young Lang has an awkward relationship, wants him to become a priest. At the age of fifteen, Lang starts a military career which leads in 1943 to the post of commandant of Auschwitz. At first a concentration camp, later an extermination camp, the camp, near the town of Auschwitz, was the site of the "slow and clumsy creation of a death factory". Lang works hard to achieve his mission: to kill as many Jews as possible, disposing of the bodies as efficiently as possible.

== Differences to the real Rudolf Höß ==
In his book, Robert Merle renamed Rudolf Höß as Rudolf Lang, a fusion between his real name and the one used after the demobilization from the SS, Franz Lang. Adolf Eichmann was renamed Wulfslang, but kept his rank of Obersturmbannführer (Lieutenant Colonel).

Robert Merle utilized Rudolf Höß’s testimonies, written in jail after his trial, as well as court records from the Nuremberg trials.

However, he came to the conclusion:

Everything Rudolf did, he did not out of viciousness, but in the name of the categorical imperative (the central tenet of Kant's moral philosophy) of duty, of loyalty to his commander, in submission to orders, out of respect for the State. In short, as a 'man of duty'; it is precisely for this behavior that he is monstrous. (Robert Merle, 27 April 1972, preface to the book.)

This, however, is an interpretation partly based on psychoanalysis and probably Merle's desire to explain how a human being could commit Höß' actions. Merle's Lang is an idealised version of Höß, stylised as a tragic persona.

While it is true that Höß tried in his process to exonerate his subordinates by declaring they did nothing but follow his orders, which he gave following in turn Heinrich Himmler's orders, there were multiple cases of corruption in Höß' time as commandant.

Absolutely true, and also backed by Höß' autobiography as well as Jean-Claude Pressac's Auschwitz: Technique and Operation of the Gas Chambers and The Crematories of Auschwitz is the depiction of Höß/Lang as not especially antisemitic or suffering from hatred to the other target groups of Nazi extermination policy, like gypsies in Porajmos, Poles or Russians. The "special treatment" (Sonderbehandlung) was just the execution of an order for Höß or other protagonists of Nazi extermination, like Frank Prüfer who constructed and built the crematories of Auschwitz, fulfilling an order to the Topf crematories branch.

The literary depiction of the execution of Nazi extermination policy not out of an antisemitic or antiziganist ideology, but as the mere fulfillment of orders, using methods of industrial science to optimise the process to economically leading "units" (German: Einheiten (plural)) to receive "special treatment" (German: Sonderbehandlung), thereby making objects out of living persons and creating an utter feeling of horror, may be the greatest achievement of Merle.

== Film adaptation ==
In 1977, the novel was made into a movie with Götz George as Franz Lang (the name "Rudolf" was changed into Franz), directed by Theodor Kotulla.

== Bibliography ==
- Merle, Robert. La mort est mon métier, Paris: Gallimard, 1952. OCLC 1598533 (in French)
- Merle, Robert. Death is my Trade, London: Derek Verschoyle, 1954. OCLC 7182653
- Merle, Robert. Death is my Trade (Alan Ross, trans.), London: Brown & Watson, 1958. OCLC 562336349
- Höss, Rudolf. Commandant of Auschwitz: The Autobiography of Rudolf Hoess (Constantine FitzGibbon, trans.), Cleveland, Ohio: World, 1959. OCLC 851439057
- Höß, Rudolf. Kommandant in Auschwitz: autobiographische Aufzeichnungen von Rudolf Höß, Stuttgart: Deutsche Verlags-Anstalt, 1961. OCLC 221804349 (in German)

== See also ==
- Second World War
- Auschwitz
- concentration camp
- extermination camp
- Shoah
