= Military marine mammal =

Marine animals trained for military purposes

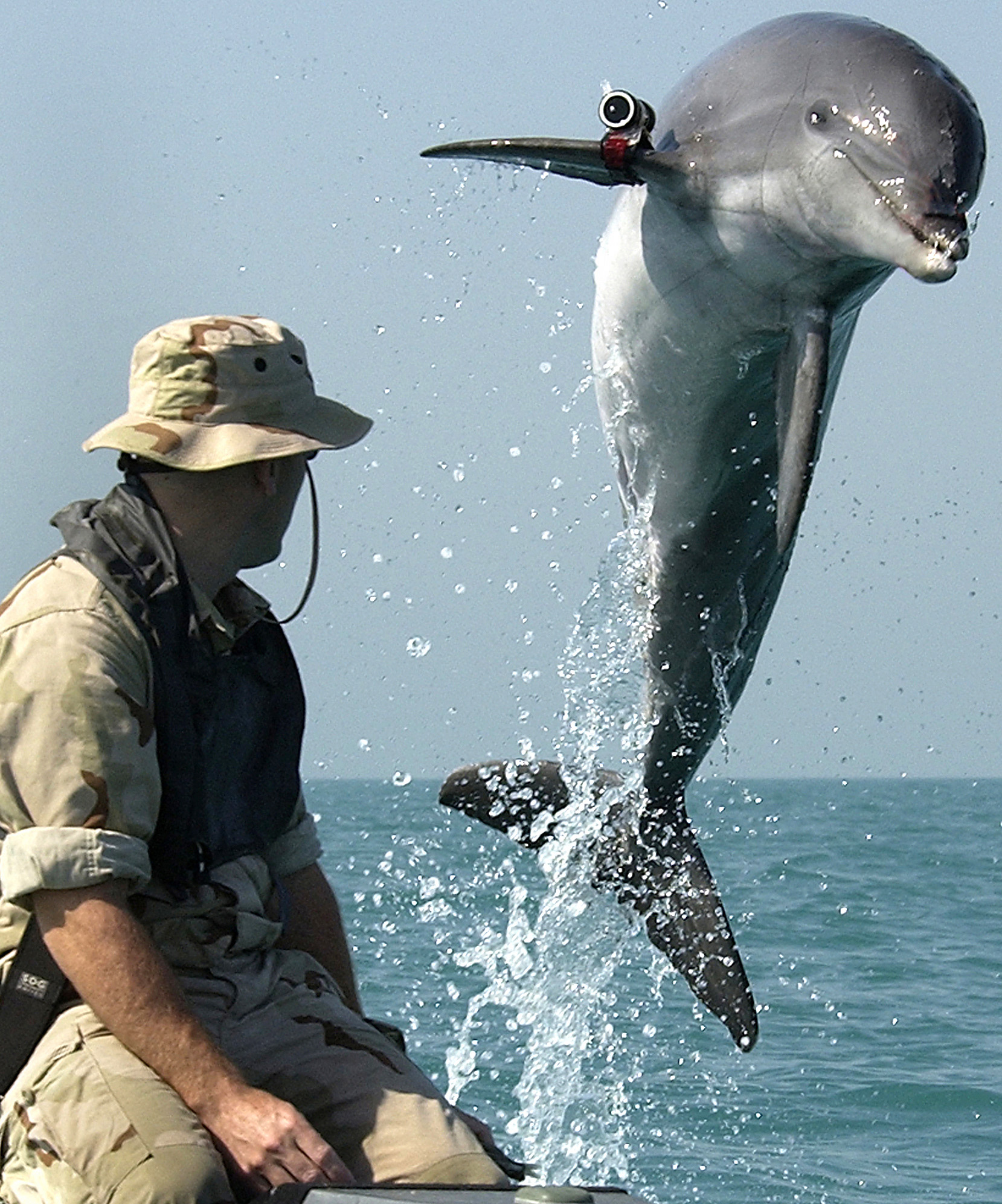
KDog, a common bottlenose dolphin of the United States Navy Marine Mammal Program, performs mine-clearance work while wearing a locating pinger in the Persian Gulf during the Iraq War.

A military marine mammal is a cetacean or pinniped that has been trained for military uses. Examples include bottlenose dolphins, seals, sea lions, and beluga whales. The United States and Soviet militaries have trained and employed oceanic dolphins for various uses. Military marine mammals have been trained to rescue lost naval swimmers, guard navy ships against enemy divers, locate mines for later clearance by divers, and aid in location and recovery of equipment lost on the seabed.

== Dolphins ==
=== Uses of military dolphins ===
These animals are able to defend ships against enemy divers, locate and retrieve lost or damaged equipment, attach homing devices for torpedoes to larger targets, locate submarines, and much more.

=== Soviet Union Navy dolphins ===
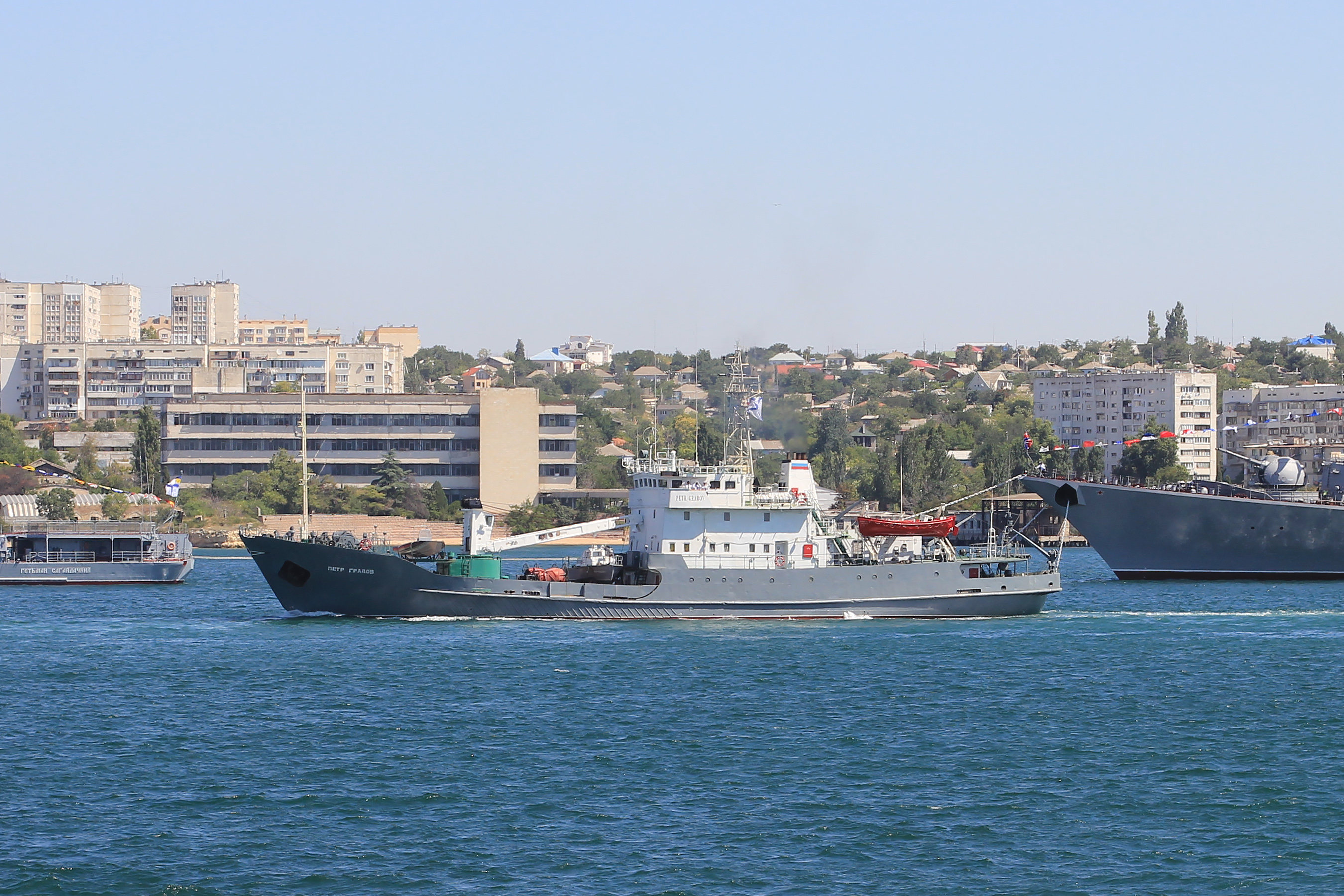
A vessel intended for transporting combat dolphins in USSR, and later in Russia

The Soviet Navy operated a research facility to explore military uses of marine mammals at Kazachya Bukhta (44.5800°N 33.4023°E), near Sevastopol. The Russian military's dolphin program is believed to have languished in the early 1990s.

A Soviet military Beluga whale named Tichka twice escaped in 1991 and 1992, crossed the Black Sea and was admired by the residents of the Turkish town Gerze, who called him Aydın.

==== Russian Federation, Ukraine, and Iran ====
After the fall of the Soviet Union, the Soviet military dolphin program was passed to the Ukrainian Navy. In March 2000 the BBC reported that the Ukrainian navy had transferred their military dolphin project from Sevastopol to Iran. Iran bought the animals, and the chief trainer carried on his research at Iran's new oceanarium.

In 2012, Ukraine allegedly "resurrected" the military dolphin program. After the 2014 annexation of Crimea, the Ukrainian dolphin program was taken over by Russia. Conflicting statements have been made regarding the fate of the dolphins. One claim is that the program had been demilitarized prior to the annexation, with all military dolphins either sold commercially or dead by natural causes. A counter-claim suggests that dolphins died "patriotically" after going on hunger strikes and resisting their Russian captors. Russia reportedly intended to use advanced technology to visualise the dolphin's biosonar signals in future military dolphin research.

Government public records show that in 2016, five bottlenose dolphins were purchased by the Russian defence ministry from Moscow’s Utrish Dolphinarium.

In 2022 and 2023, there were reports that Russia had deployed dolphins to protect the Sevastopol Naval Base from Ukrainian attacks.

In 2026, The Wall Street Journal reported that Iran may use dolphins carrying mines in attacks on ships in the Strait of Hormuz.

=== United States Navy dolphins ===
The U.S. Navy trains dolphins and sea lions under the U.S. Navy Marine Mammal Program, which is based in San Diego, California. The Navy gets some of its dolphins from the Gulf of Mexico. Military dolphins were used by the U.S. Navy during the First and Second Gulf Wars, and their use dates back to the Vietnam War. About 75 dolphins were in the program circa 2007, and around 70 dolphins and 30 sea lions were reported to be in the program in 2019.

Pioneering the use of dolphins in warfare was the scientist James Fitzgerald whom the CIA sent to Key West, Florida, to set up a classified laboratory in 1964. His assignment was to study whether dolphin hydrodynamics could be applied to the design of submarines, torpedoes and missiles and whether the animals could be trained to perform missions.

The United States Navy implemented a program in 1960 to work with dolphins and sea lions in order to help with defense, mine detection, and the design of new submarines and new underwater weapons. The Navy did many tests with several marine mammals to determine which would be best for the required missions, with "more than 19 species...including some sharks and birds" tested, though the bottlenose dolphin and California sea lion were considered the best at what the Navy needed them for. The bottlenose dolphins' asset was their highly evolved biosonar, helping to find underwater mines, and the sea lions' asset was their impeccable underwater vision, which can help to detect enemy swimmers. In fiscal year 2007, the United States Navy spent $14 million on research on marine mammal training programs for object recovery and mine detection and had 75 trained dolphins.

In 2005, there were press reports that some U.S. military dolphins based on Lake Pontchartrain had escaped during the Hurricane Katrina flooding. The U.S. Navy dismissed these stories as nonsense or a hoax, though they may be taking on the status of an urban myth.

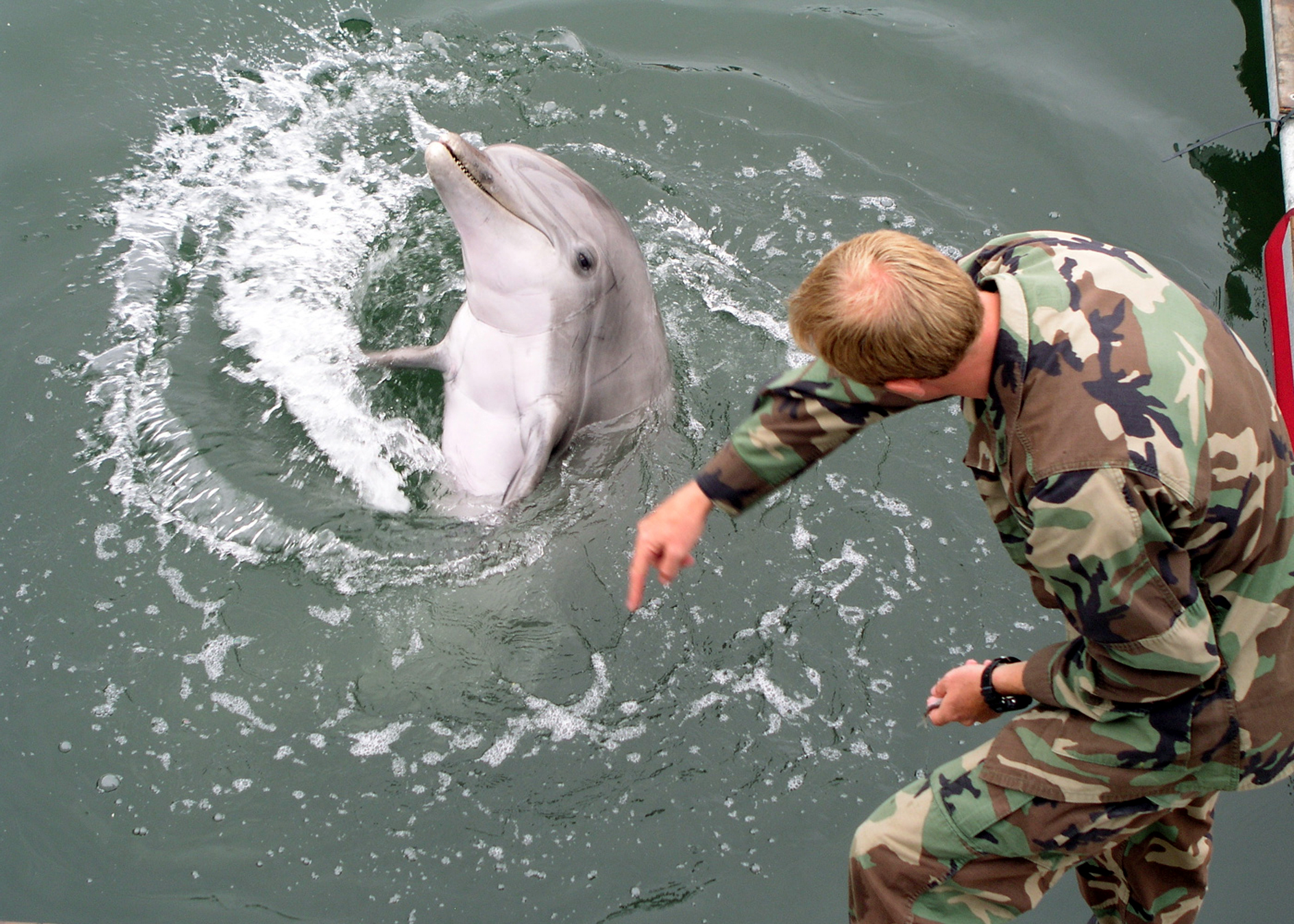
A bottlenose dolphin responding to its trainer's hand gestures.

==== Care of animals ====
The marine mammals used for the Navy's research and operations are cared for by a full-time staff of veterinarians, veterinarian technicians, and highly trained marine biologists.

==== Training ====
The dolphins and sea lions are trained by five teams of the Navy's Marine Mammal fleet members. One team specializes in swimmer detection, three teams in mine location, and another team in object recoveries. The quick-response goal of this fleet is to mobilize a team and be on site within 72 hours. Dolphins are trained much like police dogs and hunting dogs are. They are given rewards such as fish on correct completion of a task. Dolphins are trained to detect underwater mines and enemy swimmers and then report back to their handlers. Rumours that dolphins had been trained to kill divers have been denied by the US Navy, which claims that training dolphins to fight or kill humans is impossible.

Retired US Admiral Tim Keating claimed that military dolphins could be used to detect mines in the Strait of Hormuz, after Iran threatened to close the waterway in January 2012.

=== Israel ===
On January 10, 2022, Hamas, through a report by Al-Quds, suspects Israel of using dolphins for the purpose of targeting Hamas dive fighters. Similar Israel-related animal conspiracy theories were stated in August 2015 when Al-Quds claimed to have sources regarding another incident of a cetacean fighter, equipped with a remote control, a camera, and a weapon that can fire harpoon-type projectiles.

=== Harm to animals ===
Ric O'Barry, a former U.S. Navy and civilian trainer of marine mammals, writes that the dolphins complied with their training program only to obtain food. Once they became full, they would no longer be obedient. To prevent this and potential escapes, the navy installed anti-foraging devices that prevented dolphins from fully opening their mouth to feed in the oceans. He also believes that deploying dolphins during war would cause the enemy to attack all dolphins that it comes across, because there is no way to tell a friendly dolphin from a hostile one.

== Seals and sea lions ==
Seals and sea lions are trained and utilised by the US Navy and the Russian Navy. In Russia, dolphins and seals have been trained to carry tools for divers and to detect torpedoes, mines, and other ammunition to working depths of up to 120 metres. Seals are considered better suited than belugas for military use in polar conditions for their "high professionalism" and ability to learn, retain, and understand oral commands.

== Belugas ==
In 2019, a beluga was found off the coast of Norway that was believed to have most likely been trained by the Russian Navy. The beluga, called Hvaldimir, was wearing a harness that was labeled "Equipment of St. Petersburg", seemed comfortable around humans, and attempted to pull ropes from the sides of a Norwegian fishing vessel. Beluga research was conducted by the Murmansk Sea Biology Research Institute in northern Russia on behalf of the Russian Navy. Experiments were conducted to determine whether belugas could be used to “guard entrances to naval bases’” in arctic regions and "assist deepwater divers and if necessary kill any strangers who enter their territory". The research concluded that dolphins and seals were better suited to military use in polar conditions than belugas.

== See also ==
- Cetacean intelligence
- The Day of the Dolphin, a novel and later movie about training dolphins to carry out an assassination
- U.S. Navy Marine Mammal Program
