= Biblioteca ilustrada de Gaspar y Roig =

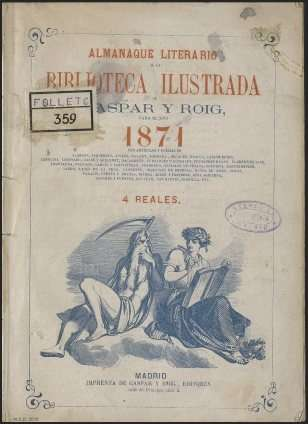
- Literary almanac of Biblioteca ilustrada de Gaspar y Roig, 1871.
- Edited by: José Gaspar y Maristany, Fernando and José Roig Oliveres
- Country: Spain
- Language: European Spanish
- Genre: General literature
- Publisher: Gaspar y Roig
- Published: Since 1851
- Media type: Print (hardcover)

Biblioteca ilustrada de Gaspar y Roig (Spanish for 'Illustrated Library of Gaspar y Roig') is an editorial collection published by Gaspar y Roig since 1851, in Madrid, Spain, under the direction of Eduardo Chao.

== Overview ==
The Biblioteca ilustrada de Gaspar y Roig is a collection of cheap illustrated books of medium production quality, with two columns, condensed fonts and narrow margins to reducing costs, and engravings inserted into the text. The folio format is intended for newspaper readers.

All the books begin with an engraving illustration in order to encourage reading, be it an allusion to the fine arts, a printing press, a garden with ladies or some reading gentlemen.

Noted for its encyclopaedia-like material, the content matter of the collection covers a wide range of subjects, such as reference works (Diccionario Enciclopédico Gaspar y Roig); scientific disciplines (Buffon's Histoire Naturelle); history books (Cesare Cantù's Storia Universale, Juan de Mariana's Historia general de España, William H. Prescott's History of the Conquest of Peru, with a Preliminary View of the Civilization of the Incas); biographies (Washington Irving's A History of the Life and Voyages of Christopher Columbus); compilation of Costumbrist prints (Los españoles pintados por sí mismos); Romantic literary works by François-René de Chateaubriand; classic works by Miguel de Cervantes and Victor Hugo; novels by Manuel Fernández y González, Torcuato Tárrago y Mateos, Sophie Ristaud Cottin, Jules Verne, Walter Scott, among others; as well as a whole Bible in Spanish (Biblia de Scío).

== See also ==
- El Museo Universal
