= Fortune de France =

French historical novel series

- Fortune de France (Book 1); 1977 French hardcover
- Fortune de France (1977); En nos vertes années (1979); Paris ma bonne ville (1980); Le Prince que voilà (1982); La violente amour (1983); La Pique du jour (1985); La Volte des vertugadins (1991); L’Enfant-Roi (1993); Les Roses de la vie (1995); Le Lys et la pourpre (1997); La Gloire et les périls (1999); Complots et cabales (2001); Le Glaive et les amours (2003)
- Author: Robert Merle
- Country: France
- Genre: Historical fiction
- Publisher: Plon
- Published: 1977–2003
- Media type: Print

Fortune de France (Fortunes of France) is a sequence of 13 historical novels by French author Robert Merle, published between 1977 and 2003. The series is about 16th and 17th century France through the eyes of fictitious Huguenot doctor-turned-spy Pierre de Siorac. It made Merle a household name in France, with the author repeatedly called the Alexandre Dumas of the 20th century. As of 2014, Fortune de France had sold over five million copies in France.

== Plot ==
The series spans the years 1547 to 1661, shadowing the European wars of religion of the 16th and 17th centuries. In the first novel, veteran soldiers Jean de Siorac and Jean de Sauveterre settle into Château Mespech in Périgord, a beautiful but dangerous region of France far from the influence of the king. Staunch royalists but also devoted Huguenots, the men assemble a loyal community around them, but are challenged as religious unrest, poverty and famine threaten their way of life and push the country into chaos.

Siorac's son Pierre narrates the first six novels, and Pierre's own son Pierre-Emmanuel narrates the remaining seven volumes. The men meet many notable people and witness various historical events, including the marriage of Henry, King of Navarre to Margaret of France, the St. Bartholomew's Day massacre, and the assassination of Henry III of France.

== Novels ==
The first novel, Fortune de France, was published by Plon in 1977 when Merle was nearly 70, and the last was released in 2003 when he was 95. Merle wrote the first installment as a one-off, but continued the series as "readers clamoured for more". The author died in 2004.

The series was never translated into English until Pushkin Press published the first volume (translated by T. Jefferson Kline) as The Brethren on 11 September 2014, with a US edition released on 3 March 2015. Both English versions of the second novel were published by Pushkin as City of Wisdom and Blood in September 2015. The third novel was published as Heretic Dawn on 4 February 2016, and the fourth novel was published on 5 July 2018 as League of Spies. As of January 2021, Pushkin Press has no plans to move forward with translating and publishing the remaining nine volumes of the series in English.

Kline, a fan of the series, submitted his translation on spec to Pushkin, where editor Daniel Seton was surprised to find that such an "undiscovered gem" had been thus far overlooked in the UK.

#	Year	Title	English language edition	Summary
1.	1977	Fortune de France (Fortunes of France); ISBN 2-259-00319-2	The Brethren (2014); ISBN 1-782-27044-2 (UK)	Huguenot doctor-turned-spy Pierre de Siorac tells the story of the Brethren: his father, the Baron Jean de Siorac, and the baron's friend Jean de Sauveterre, two army veterans who build a prosperous community within the walls of Château Mespech that they must protect from the rising religious and economic chaos in the rest of France.
2.	1979	En nos vertes années (In Our Green Years); ISBN 2-259-00457-1	City of Wisdom and Blood (2015); ISBN 1-782-27124-4 (UK)	In 1556, an adult Pierre, his naive brother Samson and the clever Miroul leave the safety of Mespech to travel to Montpellier, a volatile and dangerous centre of Renaissance learning.
3.	1980	Paris ma bonne ville (Paris, My Fair City); ISBN 2-259-00687-6	Heretic Dawn (2016); ISBN 1-782-27193-7 (UK)	In 1572, Pierre finds himself in Paris, maneuvering within the many dangerous intrigues of the royal court seeking a pardon. But the hidden tensions will soon erupt in the St. Bartholomew's Day massacre, and Pierre's very life is on the line.
4.	1982	Le Prince que voilà (Behold the Prince); ISBN 2-259-00929-8	League of Spies (2018); ISBN 978-1782273929 (UK)	
5.	1983	La violente amour (The Violent Love); ISBN 2-253-13612-3		
6.	1985	La Pique du jour (The Break of Day); ISBN 2-259-01290-6		
7.	1991	La Volte des vertugadins (The Dance of the Bustles); ISBN 2-87706-108-6		
8.	1993	L’Enfant-Roi (The Child King); ISBN 2-87706-175-2		
9.	1995	Les Roses de la vie (The Roses of Life); ISBN 2-7242-9091-7		
10.	1997	Le Lys et la pourpre (The Lily and Purple); ISBN 2-7441-1554-1		
11.	1999	La Gloire et les périls (Glory and Peril); ISBN 2-7441-3209-8		
12.	2001	Complots et cabales (Plots and Cabals); ISBN 2-7441-5000-2		
13.	2003	Le Glaive et les amours (Love and the Sword); ISBN 2-7441-7107-7		

== Style and historical interpretation ==
Merle wrote the 500-page novels of his Fortune de France series "using many of the idioms and speech rhythms of that period, some of them taken from the region of Périgord". James Kirkup noted in The Independent:

Merle was a genuine scholar of language, and believed that the atmosphere of an era could not be expressed without many interventions of regional dialects and quaint usages of the times. He admired William Makepeace Thackeray's The History of Henry Esmond, set in the 18th century, whose language he had mastered to perfection.

Merle himself said, "The readers accepted their apprenticeship and were delighted to learn so many good expressions and terms from the Old French of the 16th century."

In 1982's Le Prince que voilà (Behold the Prince), Merle challenged the typical "caricatured" portrayal of Henry III by presenting the king as "a brilliant intellectual [who was] very courageous in his refusal to punish the Protestants".

Pushkin Press editor Daniel Seton suggests that Merle's own experiences in World War II influenced Fortune de France novels, saying "There is quite a clear antiwar stance. While there is plenty of action and swordplay, the protagonist is generally horrified by the descent of his country into civil war and the cruelty shown by both sides, Protestants and Catholics, during the conflict. His main aim is to try to protect himself and those close to him, regardless of religion, from the violence."

Robert Merle attached great importance to the historical accuracy of his novels. He did not want his novels to be associated with those of Alexandre Dumas or Victor Hugo for example, whose works had, according to him, no historical value. On the other hand, he felt closer to Gustave Flaubert, author of Salammbô.

== Reception ==
Kirkup called the Fortune de France series "spectacular" and dubbed it Merle's "major achievement". Douglas Johnson of The Guardian described the author as "a master of the historical novel". The series made Merle a household name in France, and he has been repeatedly called the Alexandre Dumas of the 20th century. Le Monde dubbed Merle "France's greatest popular novelist", and Le Figaro observed, "Robert Merle is one of the very few French writers who have attained both popular success and the admiration of critics."

Writing for The Wall Street Journal, Allan Massie praised Merle's "thorough research, depth of understanding and popular touch", noting that "one of the strengths of Merle’s novels in his ability to evoke the feeling and texture of everyday life as well as high politics". Massie compared the first novel in Merle's series to Maurice Druon's The Accursed Kings (Les Rois maudits), another famed French historical novel series, writing "There is a philosophical depth to the novel absent from Druon, for the Brethren are attracted to the Reformed Protestant (or Huguenot) faith ... Though not as gripping as The Accursed Kings, The Brethren never strays, as Druon sometimes does, into the grotesque. It has a credibly human solidity." Toby Clements of The Telegraph wrote, "There are set-piece discussions on the dilemmas of faith that are informative if not the stuff of high drama, and passages on the history of France that can only be made sense of with the aid of a map and a memory for names. But elsewhere there is much colour, and, overall, The Brethren gives a salty and plausible idea of just how different, odd and parlous life might have been."

As of 2014, Fortune de France had sold over five million copies in France.
