= Weekend at Dunkirk =

- Directed by: Henri Verneuil
- Written by: François Boyer; Robert Merle
- Produced by: Raymond Hakim; Robert Hakim
- Starring: Jean-Paul Belmondo
- Cinematography: Henri Decaë
- Edited by: Claude Durand
- Music by: Maurice Jarre
- Production companies: Paris Film Productions; Interopa Film
- Distributed by: Pathé Consortium Cinéma
- Release date: 18 December 1964
- Running time: 119 minutes
- Countries: France; Italy
- Language: French
- Box office: 3,154,140 admissions (France)

Weekend at Dunkirk (French: Week-end à Zuydcoote) is a 1964 French-Italian drama war film directed by Henri Verneuil and starring Jean-Paul Belmondo. It is based on the 1949 Prix Goncourt winning novel Week-end at Zuydcoote (French: Week-end à Zuydcoote) by Robert Merle.

== Plot ==
Set during the Battle of Dunkirk, the film follows Julien Maillat, a French Army sergeant who tries to join the British Army on the Royal Navy's boat flotilla to Britain. No matter how hard he tries to make it, he and his French squad-mates and colleagues are hard-pressed to get away as the fight is getting harder and the Germans closer and closer.

== Selected cast ==
- Jean-Paul Belmondo as Staff sergeant French Army Julien Maillat
- Catherine Spaak as Jeanne
- Jean-Pierre Marielle as a French military chaplain friend of Maillat
- François Périer as Alexandre
- Pierre Mondy as Dhéry
- Pierre Vernier as undertaker
- Paul Préboist as a soldier
- Ronald Howard as captain Robinson
- Eric Sinclair : le capitaine Clark
- Donald O'Brien as the British sergeant controlling the lines on the beach
- Kenneth Haigh : John Atkins
- Marie Dubois : Hélène, the French wife of Atkins
- Nigel Stock as the British sergeant carrying rocking horse and burned during a German attack
- Christian Barbier : Paul

== Reception ==
The film was the ninth most popular movie at the French box office in 1964.

According to Fox records, the film needed to earn $1,700,000 in rentals to break even and made $1,755,000, meaning it made a profit.
