= Death Is My Trade (film) =

1977 film

Death is My Trade
- Aus einem deutschen Leben
- Directed by: Theodor Kotulla
- Written by: Theodor Kotulla; Robert Merle
- Based on: Death Is My Trade by Robert Merle
- Music by: Eberhard Weber
- Release date: 1977
- Language: German

Death is My Trade (German: Aus einem deutschen Leben) is a 1977 German film, which is based on the script of director Theodor Kotulla, starring Götz George in the leading role. The script is based on the French novel La mort est mon métier by Robert Merle, which was published in 1952 (English edition: Death Is My Trade).

Like the novel, the film is partly based on interrogation records of the trial against Rudolf Höß, SS-officer and commander of the Nazi concentration and extermination camp Auschwitz, as well as on his autobiographical notes. He made these notes first during his time as a British POW, then, after he was extradited, as a Polish prisoner in 1946/47, before he was executed as a convicted war criminal. Instead of using the name Rudolf Höß, whose life was the model for the film, the pseudonym Franz Lang is used, in order that he remain anonymous. The real Rudolf Höß had gone into hiding allegedly working as a boatman after World War II using this pseudonym until he was unmasked and arrested in 1946.

The film is divided into 14 different episodes, which describe fragmentary and important scenes of Franz Lang's life.

== Cast ==
- Götz George as Franz Lang
- Hans Korte as Heinrich Himmler

== Plot ==
Franz Lang, born in 1900, unsuccessfully tries to get deployed to the front line during World War I. Eventually the teenager volunteers to work at a military hospital, where he gets to know injured Hauptmann Günther. The German Army officer explains to him the only sin: not being a "good German", which would emerge as a recurring theme in Lang's life. The officer promises young Franz to enlist him in his newly founded regiment.

In 1917 Franz Lang serves at the front, which he had long desired, under the command of Captain Günther. While manning a machine gun position, he witnesses the death of two of his comrades. His only remaining comrade wants them to desert their position, but Lang wants to fulfill the wish of his group leader, who had just died, to stay in the machine gun position as long as possible, and so kills the deserter. Severely wounded and carrying his machine gun, Franz Lang drags himself behind the front line, where he is found unconscious by Captain Günther. Later he promotes him to the rank of non-commissioned officer, as Franz Lang is the only survivor of the hopeless battle.

Even after the war, during the Weimar Republic, Lang maintains his devotion to duty and subservience to authority which is why he often gets into trouble in civil life. In 1919 a comrade helps him find work in a machine factory, but after a conflict with his elderly colleague, who struggles with Lang's energetic pace of work, Lang is dismissed due to the shop stewards siding with the colleague.

After his dismissal Franz Lang gets involved in nationalist circles. As a result, he joins the extreme right-wing Freikorps Roßbach, which intervenes in the Ruhr Uprising against left-wing revolutionary workers in the Baltic states and on other occasions. In a group of arrested insurgents, he recognizes a former wartime comrade, who Lang supports at first. He points out to his commander that his comrade was very committed at the front and that he was awarded the Iron Cross. The commander of the unit convinces Franz Lang that the prisoners are communists and that he cannot relate to them as comrades anymore. He says that they are ideologically blinded by "Jewish-Marxist agitators" and that orders are always binding and have to be carried out even against personal interests. Franz Lang is finally content with this explanation and when his former comrade later tries to flee, he shoots him.

After the dissolution of the Freikorps, Lang finds a job as a construction worker. He uses his first wage in order to pay his debts to his comrades, and so he has hardly any money left to live off. In addition, he is overwhelmed by the physical strain of the work and despairs about not being able to fulfill his duties. Lang decides to end his own life on his own terms. But before he can shoot himself with his Mauser pistol, one of his fellow construction workers visits him: He instantly guesses what Lang is about to do and warns him to stay loyal to Germany and that he is burdened with the responsibility for this country, even though he may no longer be a soldier. Lang's colleague, whom Lang assumes to be a member of the NSDAP, leaves him with a copy of the Völkischer Beobachter. Impressed by the fighting talk in the official party newspaper, Franz Lang decides to join the NSDAP, too.

In 1922 Franz Lang visits a (Sturmlokal) belonging to the local SA: He tells the SA-Obersturmführer that he wants to have responsibility and help Germany rise to power again. As he is filling in the form required for a member ID card and admission, the 'Obersturmführer' tells him that due to his Roßbach service he has been accepted into the SA and that he will receive a preliminary ID card. Since Lang could not afford an SA uniform, the SA leader provides him with the uniform of a SA man who was shot.

As a member of the NSDAP and SA, Franz Lang responds to a call for a group of soldiers from a couple of landowners who want their land protected.

Franz Lang is stationed there, together with a couple of his comrades, when the former treasurer of the Freikorps appears in town. He had stolen the free corps funds several years earlier, run off, but now surfaced in Mecklenburg. During a drinking session Franz Lang uncovers the alleged Communist Party of Germany|KPD membership of this former free corps comrade. The free corps members present at the meeting abduct and beat up the alleged traitor in a forest and Franz Lang shoots him. One frightened person involved in the murder reveals the crime to the authorities and in 1924 Franz Lang is sentenced to ten years in prison. In prison he reads Hitler's "Mein Kampf" and becomes a fanatic Nazi. After almost five years, Lang is released in 1928 as a result of an Amnesty.

The NSDAP helps him in finding employment on the land of a party comrade, the former colonel Baron of Jeseritz. The landowner is soon very impressed by Lang's services and supports him by donating a neglected farm that Lang may autonomously manage. He also advises him to marry Else, who was chosen by the baron himself, because she conforms to Aryan female standards. Lang does as he is told and marries Else. At a party held later at the farm he meets Heinrich Himmler, who claims to have heard of Lang's reliability and organisational skills. Franz Lang receives an order from Himmler himself to organise a cavalry unit, which is later to become part of the Schutzstaffel.

When the National Socialists gain power over the Republic, Lang becomes an Unterscharführer with the SS riders, and in 1934 SS Reich leader Himmler offers him an administrative post at the Dachau concentration camp close to Munich. Even though he and his wife would prefer to carry on working in agriculture, Lang accepts the offer as a "commitment to the party and the homeland" which Himmler approves. Lang points out to his wife that the SS Reich Leader had chosen him particularly because of these organisational skills and his experience as a prisoner. After all, he himself had been imprisoned for five years.

In the Dachau concentration camp Franz Lang is finally trained to be the future camp commander. He fulfils his duties without protest and, as years go by, he is promoted to the rank of SS-Sturmbannführer. During World War II Lang is once again summoned to Himmler who informs him, under strict confidentiality, about Hitler's plan to annihilate the Jews in the holocaust and about the camps, which are planned in Poland. As a result, Lang takes over the Auschwitz extermination camp in Poland, which is now occupied by the Germans. Adolf Eichmann informs him about the "capacities" of the camp. Until then, according to the party leadership the killings were too ineffective. More or less incidentally, Lang develops the idea of using the poison zyklon B as a "hygienically clean" and "effective" solution to gas the Jews who are deported to Auschwitz. Because he implements this method successfully in the camp, he is promoted to the rank of SS-Obersturmbannführer after Himmler has visited him there.

During a meal with the head of the Chelmno concentration camp Lang's wife Else finds out what is going on in the camp and when she challenges him, he defends himself by saying it is his duty. He does not contradict his wife when she assumes that he would also kill their children if he was told to. He even admits that he would do so. He argues that he is not responsible for what he does in the camp, as he is following orders given by his superiors.

At the end of the war Lang hides out at a farm in the American occupation zone. He is found by American soldiers and subsequently imprisoned. During an interrogation, when Lang is asked by a US officer whether he thinks that the eradication of the Jews was right, he says: "It is not relevant what I believe, I only obeyed."

Franz Lang is extradited to Poland where he is sentenced to death and subsequently hanged in Auschwitz.
