= Week-end at Zuydcoote =

1949 novel by Robert Merle

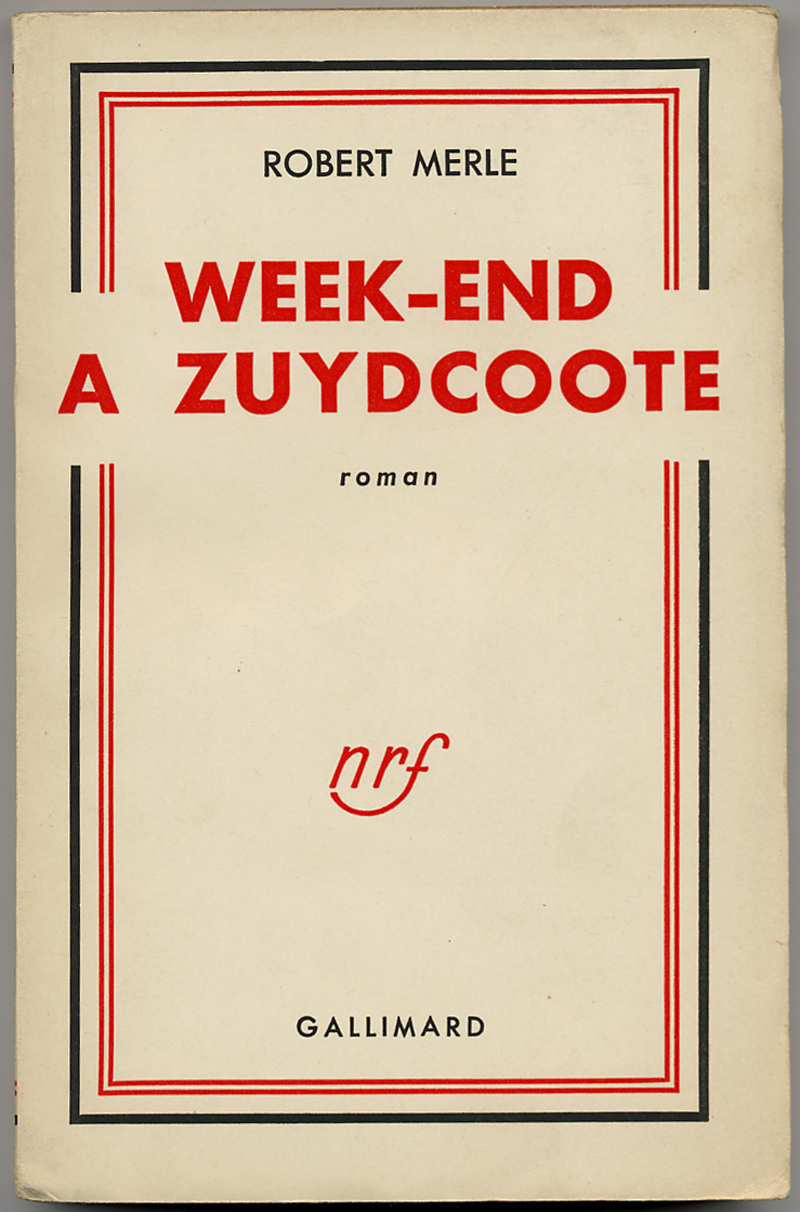
- First edition
- Author: Robert Merle
- Original title: Week-end à Zuydcoote
- Translator: K. Rebillon-Lambley
- Language: French
- Publisher: Gallimard, Collection Blanche
- Publication date: 1949
- Publication place: France
- English publication date: 1950
- Pages: 281
- Awards: Prix Goncourt (1949)
- OCLC: 2885103
- LC Class: PQ2625.E5278 W4

Week-end at Zuydcoote (French: Week-end à Zuydcoote; published as Weekend at Dunkirk in the United States) is a 1949 novel by French author Robert Merle, published in the Collection Blanche by Éditions Gallimard. It won the 1949 Prix Goncourt, France's most prestigious literary prize. It was first published in English in 1950.

In 1964 the novel was adapted to a film called Weekend at Dunkirk (French: Week-end à Zuydcoote), directed by Henri Verneuil, starring Jean-Paul Belmondo. The music for the film was composed by Maurice Jarre.
