= The Day of the Dolphin (novel) =

1967 novel by Robert Merle

1967 French edition (publ. Gallimard)

The Day of the Dolphin (French: Un animal doué de raison, lit. "an animal endowed with reason") is a 1967 science fiction thriller novel by French novelist Robert Merle. The plot concerns dolphins that are trained to communicate with humans, and their use in warfare. The central character is a government scientist with similar ideas to those of John C. Lilly.

The English translation of the novel was published in 1969 with the title The Day of the Dolphin, which is not a literal translation of the French title. The novel was the basis for the 1973 film The Day of the Dolphin, though the film's plot was significantly different from that of the book, even in inconsequential details. For instance, in the book, the dolphins are named Ivan ("the terrible") and Bessie, and call themselves Fa and Bi; in the film, they are instead named Alpha and Beta and call themselves Fa and Be.

== Reception ==
Christopher Lehmann-Haupt reviewed the translated novel favorably, characterizing it as "a provocative and altogether chilling science fiction thriller – an Ian Fleming with humanity". Joanna Russ described The Day of the Dolphin as "pure commodity: written by the yard to be bought by the yard" and dismissed it as a "vast, contentless, commercial megathere".

== See also ==
- Military dolphin
