= Katrin ist die Beste =

- Country of origin: Germany

Katrin ist die Beste is a German television series.

== See also ==
- List of German television series
