= El Museo Universal =

Defunct illustrated magazine in Spain (1857-1869)

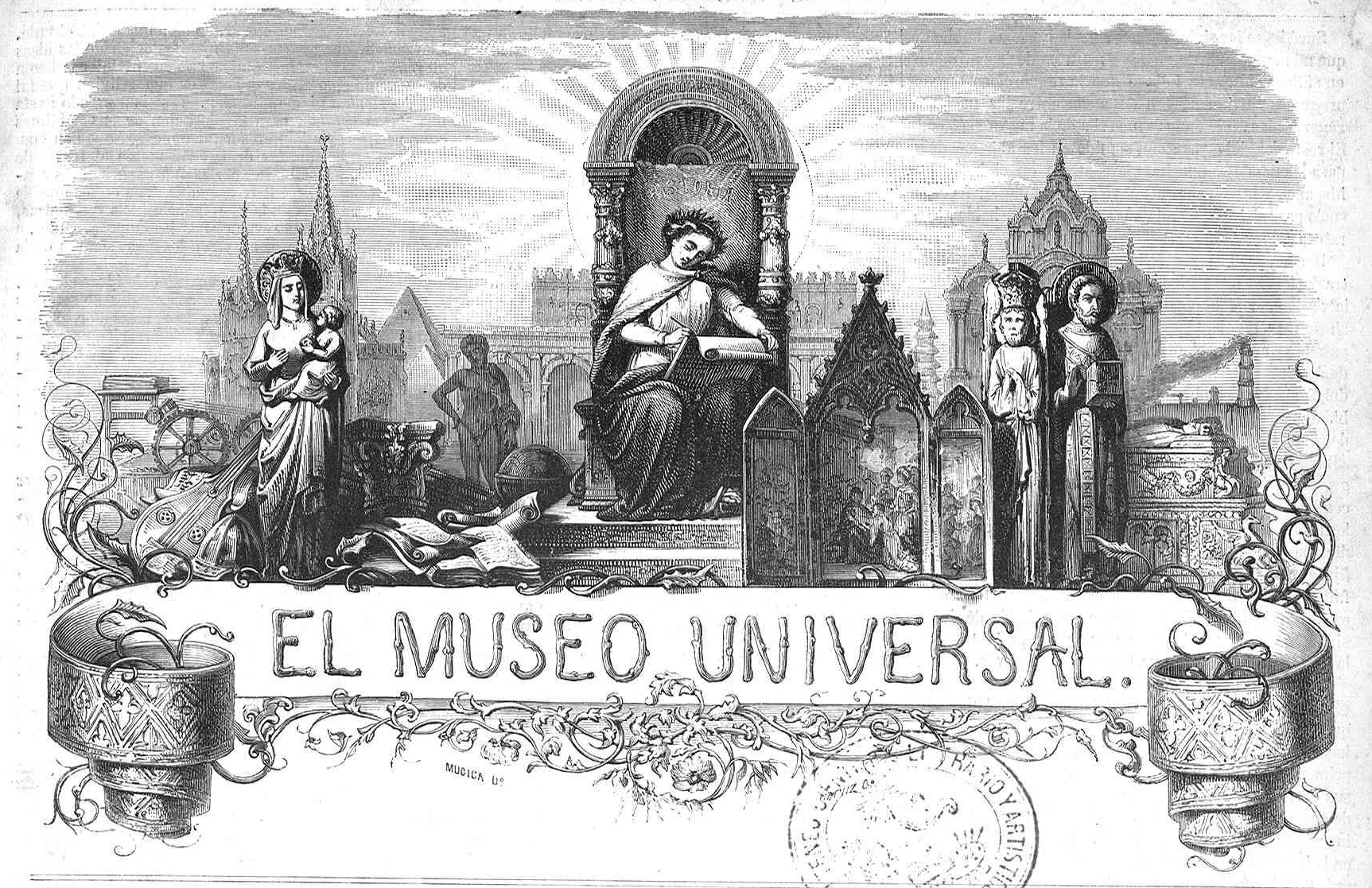
- Headboard from the first issue
- Editor: Abelardo de Carlos
- Circulation: weekly, biweekly
- Founder: José Gaspar y Maristany; José Roig
- Founded: January 15, 1857
- Final issue: November 28, 1869; 156 years ago
- Country: Spain
- Based in: Madrid
- Language: Castilian
- ISSN: 1889-8440

El Museo Universal (1857–1869) was a Spanish-language illustrated magazine produced by Gaspar y Roig in Madrid, Spain. It was a traditionalist magazine. In 1869 the magazine was absorbed into La Ilustración Española y Americana.

== See also ==
- Biblioteca ilustrada de Gaspar y Roig
