= Robert Merle =

French novelist

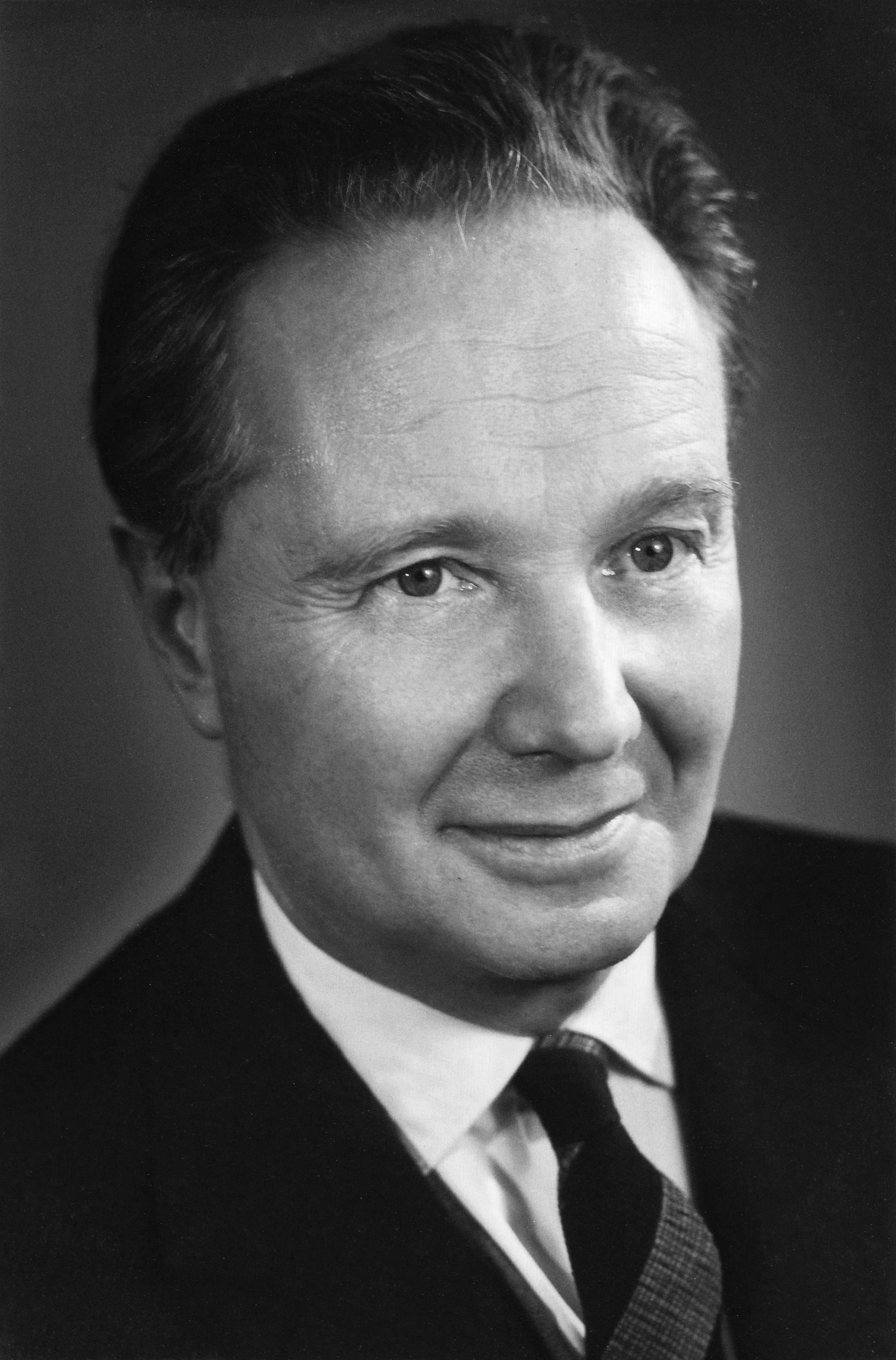
- Merle in 1964
- Born: 28 August 1908; Tébessa, French Algeria
- Died: 27 March 2004 (aged 95); Montfort-l'Amaury, France
- Occupation: Novelist
- Writing career
- Period: 1949–2003
- Notable awards: Prix Goncourt

Robert Merle (French: [ʁɔbɛʁ mɛʁl]; 28 August 1908 – 27 March 2004) was a French novelist.

== Early life ==
Merle was born in 1908 in Tébessa, French Algeria. His father Félix, who was an interpreter "with a perfect knowledge of literary and spoken Arabic", was killed in 1916 in the Dardanelles. Young Merle and his mother moved to Paris, where he attended three lycées and the Sorbonne.

== Career ==
=== Academia and World War II ===
Merle was professor of English Literature at several universities until the outbreak of the Second World War in 1939. During the war, Merle was conscripted into the French army and assigned as an interpreter to the British Expeditionary Force. In 1940, he was in the Dunkirk evacuation on the beach of Zuydcoote — which he called a "blind and abominable lottery" — and was captured by the Germans. Merle was taken prisoner to Stalag VID at Dortmund, and escaped, but was recaptured at Belgian customs. He was repatriated in July 1943, and after the war was awarded the Croix du Combattant.

=== Writing ===
Merle used his experiences at Dunkirk in his 1949 novel Week-end at Zuydcoote, which became a "sensational success" and won the Prix Goncourt. A 1964 feature film adaptation, Weekend at Dunkirk, was directed by Henri Verneuil and starred Jean-Paul Belmondo. It was a box office hit and made both men famous.

Merle's 1967 novel Un animal doué de raison (lit. A Sentient Animal), a stark Cold War satire inspired by John Lilly's studies of dolphins and the Caribbean Crisis, was translated into English and filmed as The Day of the Dolphin (1973) starring George C. Scott. Merle's post-apocalyptic novel Malevil (1972) was also adapted into a 1981 film. His 1952 novel La mort est mon métier was adapted into a 1977 film, his 1962 novel L'île was filmed as a 1987 miniseries and Le propre de l'homme (1989) was adapted into a 1996 TV movie.

Among Merle's other works are the 1950 play Flamineo, based on John Webster's The White Devil, the 1948 biography Oscar Wilde (extended in 1955 as Oscar Wilde, or The Destiny of Homosexuality), and various translations including Jonathan Swift's Gulliver's Travels. In 1965 Merle wrote Moncada: premier combat de Fidel Castro and Ahmed Ben Bella, and around this time translated the diaries of Che Guevara. Until the invasion of Afghanistan by the Red Army, Merle was a sympathizer of the French Communist Party. He said:

I was just a minor militant, and my fellow Reds did not approve of what I wrote. As for the student riots of May 1968, I never believed in the reality of that revolution. The only thing of value that came out of it was the liberation of sexual relationships.

Merle's "major achievement" was his 13-book series of historical novels, Fortune de France (1977–2003), which recreate 16th and 17th century France through the eyes of a fictitious Protestant doctor turned spy. A "genuine scholar of language", Merle wrote the novels using many of the appropriate French speech rhythms and idioms of the historical period. The series made Merle a household name in France, with the author repeatedly called the Alexandre Dumas of the 20th century.

== Personal life ==
Merle was married three times, and had four sons and two daughters. He died in 2004 at age 95 of a heart attack in Montfort-l'Amaury, France.

== Bibliography ==
- Week-end à Zuydcoote (1949) - Published in the U.S. as Week-end at Zuydcoote (1950)
- La mort est mon métier (1952) - Published in the UK as Death is my Trade (1954)
- L'île (1962) - Published in the U.S. as The Island (1964)
- Moncada, premier combat de Fidel Castro (1965)
- Un animal doué de raison (1967) - Published in the U.S. as The Day of the Dolphin (1967)
- Derrière la vitre (1970) - Published in the U.S. as Behind the Glass (1972)
- Malevil (1972)
- Les hommes protégés (1974) - Published in the U.S. as The Virility Factor (1977)
- Madrapour (1976)
- L'idole (1987) - Published in the U.S. as The Idol (1987)
- Le jour ne se lève pas pour nous (1987)
- Le propre de l'homme (1989)

=== Fortune de France series (1977-2003) ===
1. Fortune de France (1977)
2. En nos vertes années (1979)
3. Paris ma bonne ville (1980)
4. Le Prince que voilà (1982)
5. La violente amour (1983)
6. La Pique du jour (1985)
7. La Volte des vertugadins (1991)
8. L'Enfant-Roi (1993)
9. Les Roses de la vie (1995)
10. Le Lys et la Pourpre (1997)
11. La Gloire et les Périls (1999)
12. Complots et Cabales (2001)
13. Le Glaive et les amours (2003) (English: Love and the Sword)

== Reception ==
Kirkup called the Fortune de France series "spectacular" and dubbed it Merle's "major achievement". Douglas Johnson of The Guardian described the author as "a master of the historical novel". The series made Merle a household name in France, and he has been repeatedly called the Alexandre Dumas of the 20th century. Le Monde dubbed Merle "France's greatest popular novelist", and Le Figaro observed, "Robert Merle is one of the very few French writers who have attained both popular success and the admiration of critics."

Writing for The Wall Street Journal, Allan Massie praised Merle's "thorough research, depth of understanding and popular touch", noting that "one of the strengths of Merle's novels in his ability to evoke the feeling and texture of everyday life as well as high politics". Massie compared the first novel in Merle's series to Maurice Druon's The Accursed Kings (Les Rois maudits), another famed French historical novel series, writing "There is a philosophical depth to the novel absent from Druon, for the Brethren are attracted to the Reformed Protestant (or Huguenot) faith ... Though not as gripping as The Accursed Kings, The Brethren never strays, as Druon sometimes does, into the grotesque. It has a credibly human solidity." Toby Clements of The Telegraph wrote, "There are set-piece discussions on the dilemmas of faith that are informative if not the stuff of high drama, and passages on the history of France that can only be made sense of with the aid of a map and a memory for names. But elsewhere there is much colour, and, overall, The Brethren gives a salty and plausible idea of just how different, odd and parlous life might have been."

As of 2014, Fortune de France had sold over five million copies in France.
