= Ursula Dirichs =

German actress (1933–2022)

- Born: 1933; Recklinghausen
- Died: 2022 (aged 88–89)
- Occupation: Actress

Ursula Dirichs (born 1933, Recklinghausen, Germany - 2022) was a German actress.

== Early life ==
Ursula Dirichs was born in the northern Ruhr area and grew up in Königsberg. She took acting lessons at the Otto-Falkenberg-Schule in Munich, and returned to the Ruhr to begin her acting career; she worked in Oberhausen, then at the Schauspielhaus Bochum. She has worked in various cities in Germany, Austria, Switzerland and the Netherlands.

== TV career ==
Her first major appearance in television was in 1960 in the fledgling German television: On the beach of the green river Spree, based on a book by Hans Scholz, in which she played two roles. In the third sequence, set after the Battle of Kunersdorf, she played the girl Hannah, and in the fourth part, the role of the "goat princess" Bärbel Kroll. She has acted in 60 films and television playing large and small roles.

Since the 1960s, she was also in radio in a variety of roles, such as Horst Tappert in a radio adaptation of Bertolt Brecht's The Threepenny Opera, the multi-part thriller, La Boutique by Francis Durbridge and the children's radio drama The daisies'.

== Filmography ==
- 1960: Am grünen Strand der Spree, Part 3: "Prussian Fairytale" (Hannah) – TV miniseries – Director: Fritz Umgelter, with Elisabeth Müller, Peter Pasetti, Peter Thom
- 1960: Am grünen Strand der Spree, Part 4: "Bastien und Bastienne 1953" (Bärbel Kroll) – TV miniseries – Director: Fritz Umgelter, with Elisabeth Müller, Peter Pasetti, Fritz Rasp
- 1963: The State of Siege (by Albert Camus) (daughter of the judge) – TV film – Director: Fritz Umgelter, with Wolfgang Kieling, Hilde Krahl, Richard Münch
- 1966: Ten Percent (Mrs Frühwirth) – TV film – Director: Theo Mezger, with Klaus Schwarzkopf, Jochen Brockmann, Peter Schütte
- 1966: Yesterday Girl (original title: German: Abschied von gestern) (Mother) – Director: Alexander Kluge, with Alexandra Kluge, Hans Korte, Edith Kuntze-Pellogio
- 1967: The Arrangement (editor) – TV film – Director: Günter Gräwert, with Alexander Kerst, Luitgard Im, Hans Caninenberg
- 1971: The Constant Wife (by William Somerset Maugham) (Martha Culver) – TV film – Director: Wolfgang Liebeneiner, with Anaid Iplicjian, Werner Bruhns, Ida Honor
- 1971: Visit to a Small Planet (Bella Spelding) – TV film – Director: Wolfgang Liebeneiner, with Peter Fricke, Peter Pasetti, Klaus Schwarzkopf
- 1971: Two Letters to Pospischiel (Gerda) – TV film – Director: Roland Gall, with Eberhard Fechner, Dorothea Thiess, Birgit Leister
- 1972: Alpha Alpha – TV series, Episode: "Like Rats" (Ms. King) – Director: Wolfgang F. Henschel, with Karl Michael Vogler, Lilith Ungerer, Arthur Brauss
- 1972: The Piano (Lottchen) – TV film – Director: Fritz Umgelter, with Anneliese Uhlig, Günter Strack, Maria Körber
- 1973: Victor, or Power to the Children (by Jean Anouilh) (Lili) – TV film – Director: Tom Toelle, with Vadim Glowna, Ulli Philipp, Ingeborg Engelmann
- 1973: Tatort – TV series, Episode: A very ordinary murder – Regie: Dieter Wedel, with Hans Häckermann, Til Erwig, Hans Helmut Dickow
- 1979: Balthasar in a Traffic Jam (Tourists Women) – TV film – Director: Rudolf Jugert, with Heinz Rühmann, Cornelia Froboess, Louise Martini
- 1979: The Buddenbrooks (after Thomas Mann) (Ida Jungmann) – TV series – Director: Franz Peter Wirth, with Carl Raddatz, Martin Benrath, Ruth Leuwerik
- 1980: On Southern Slopes (after Eduard von Keyserling) (Mrs. Wallbaum) – TV film – Director: Michael Verhoeven, with Andrea Jonasson, Helmut Zierl, Franz-Otto Krüger
- 1982: Stella (by Johann Wolfgang von Goethe) – TV film – Director: Franz Josef Wild, with Dietlinde Turban, Judy Winter, Robert Atzorn
- 1983: Derrick – TV series, Episode: "The Culprit Sends Flowers" – Director: Helmut Ashley, with Horst Tappert, Fritz Wepper, Ruth Leuwerik
- 1988: The Absurdity of Love (Elsa) – TV film – Director: Radu Gabrea, with Erich Bar, Ingeborg lapsi, Trude Breitschopf
- 1989: Tiger, Lion, Panther – TV film – Director: Dominik Graf, with Natja Brunckhorst, Martina Gedeck, Sabine Kaack
- 1989: Derrick – TV series, Episode: "The Second Murder" – Director: Zbyněk Brynych, with Horst Tappert, Fritz Wepper, Esther Haussmann
- 1989: Heart Over Head (Margaret) – TV film – Director: Martin Theo Krieger, with Adriana Altaras, Dominik Bender, Helga Pedross
- 1990: Moffengriet: Love Is Doing What She Wants (mother Verspohl) – TV film – Director: Eberhard Itzenplitz, with Anne Marie Standing, Konstantin Graudus, Edda Barend
- 1990: Player – Director: Dominik Graf, with Susanne Carlevaris, Hansa Czypionka, Jean Daugen
- 1991: Private Lives – Director: Dušan Hanák, with Zuzana Cigánová, Danciak Stano, Michal Docolomanský
- 1992: The Goddess of Revenge – TV film – Director: Wolfgang Panzer, with Lola Müthel, Hans Lobitz, Emilio De Marchi
- 1993: Happy Holiday – TV series, Episode: "Tizias Lie" (Lisbeth) – Directed by: Heidi Kranz, Erich Neureuther, with Claudia Lössl, Ralph Schicha
- 1995: The Life After: Heavenly Prospects (Mother) – Directed by: Jörg Lühdorff, with Robert Meller, Anette Hellwig, Volkmar Kleinert
- 1996: Trip to Weimar (Garancij Marta Wolff) – TV film – Director: Dominik Graf, with Barbara Auer, Rose Marie Fendel, Walter Schultheiss
- 1999: Annaluise & Anton (after Erich Kästner) (teacher) – Director: Caroline Link, with Elea Geissler, Max Fields, Juliane Köhler
- 2004: Endlich Sex! (Saskias grandma) – TV film – Director: Klaus Knösel, with Jasmin Schwiers, Gil Ofarim, Christian Blümel

== Radio dramas ==
- 1964: The Tears of the Blind (Crazy) – Director: Günther Sauer, with John Schauer, Wolfgang Schirlitz, Udo Vioff
- 1967: La Boutique (after Francis Durbridge) (Eve Bristol) – Director: Dieter Munck, with Karl Michael Vogler, Alwin Michael Rueff, Wolfgang Weiser
- 1968: Die Dreigroschenoper (after Bertolt Brecht) (Lucy) – Director: Ulrich Lauterbach, with Horst Tappert, Willy Trenk-Trebitsch, Heidemarie Hatheyer
- 1972: Hey Hey, Its Women and Girls (Ida Stommeln, seller) – Directed by: Otto Düben, with Dirk Dautzenberg, Irene Marhold, Karin Buchali
- 1976: Treibsand (Lona Bridges) – Directed by: Otto Düben, with Claus Biederstaedt, Susanne Beck, Thessy Kuhls
- 1977: The Dwarfs in the City (Olga, sister of Professor) – Director: Urs Widmer, with Eric Kraut Schild, Erika von Thellmann, Wolfgang Höper
- 1980: Sparkling Red (Madame Colette) – Directed by: Otto Düben, with Ruth Drexel, Elisabeth Justin, Walter Lenz
- 1981: The Duration of the Piano Players – Director: Walter Adler, with Dieter Laser, Elisabeth Schwarz, Peter Roggisch
- 1981: Noblesse oblige (Lady Bowington) – Directed by: Otto Düben, with Horst Bollmann, Witta Pohl, Hans Baur
- 1988: The Assassination (after Harry Mulisch) – Director: Hans Gerd Krogmann, Peter Fitz, Benjamin Tholen, Friedrich W. Bauschulte
- 1989: The Daisies (cat) – Director: Raoul Wolfgang Schnell, with Heinz Schimmelpfennig, Verena von Behr, Charles Wirths
- 1991: The Hitchhiker's Guide to Space (after The Hitchhiker's Guide to the Galaxy by Douglas Adams) (The unobtrusive Losverkäuferin) – Director: Hartmut Kirste, with Rolf Boysen, Felix von Manteuffel, Ingo Hülsmann
