= BUFF International Film Festival =

Swedish children and youth film festival

Coordinates: 55°36′21″N 13°02′09″E

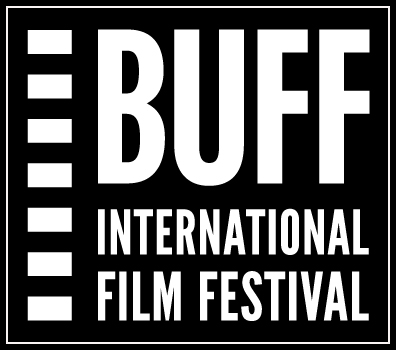
BUFF logo.

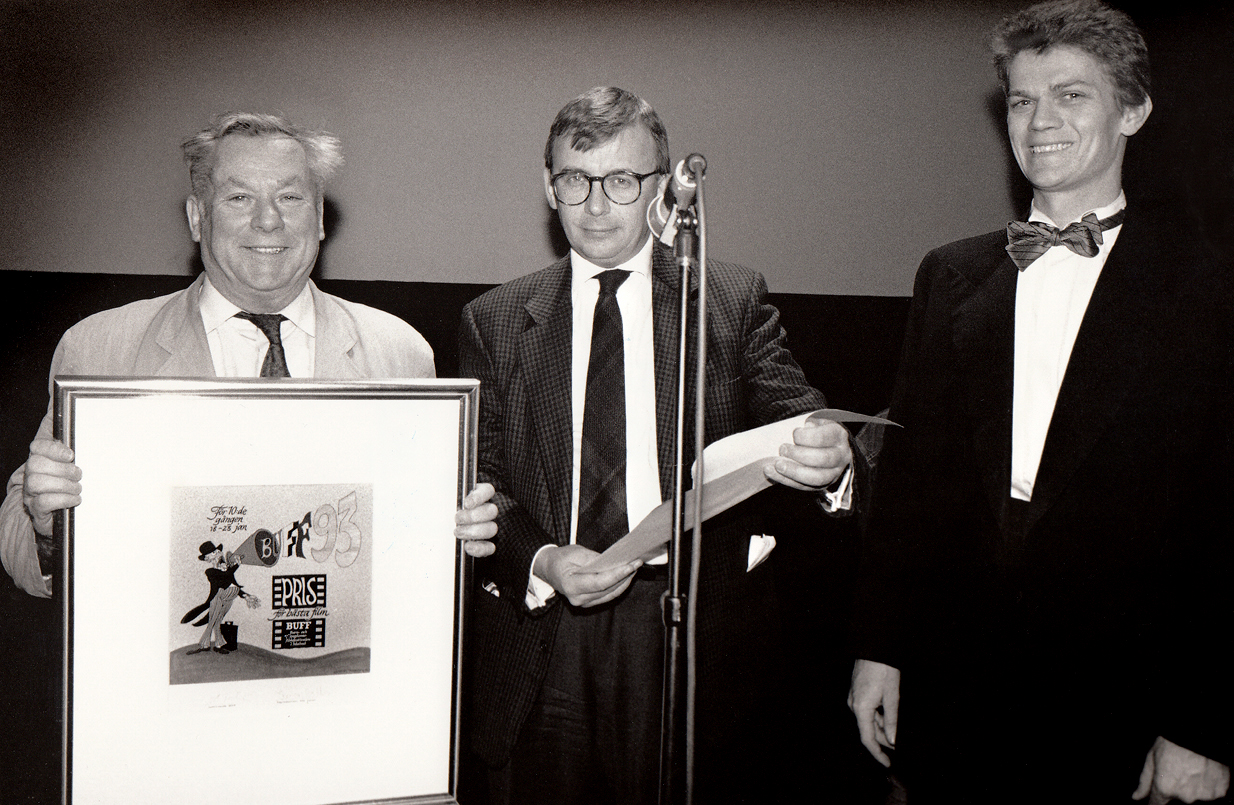
The winner of Best Buff-Film in 1993 was the French film Children of wreckers. The award was accepted by Raymond Lefevre, festival director of the French Children's Film Festival in Laon. Prize givers were Johan Bengt-Påhlsson (in the middle) and festival general Ola Tedin.

BUFF International Film Festival (Swedish: BUFF Filmfestival) is an international children and youth film festival in Malmö, Sweden, held annually in March. It was founded in 1984 and is a member of the European Children’s Film Association (ECFA).

== Awards ==
Each year film awards are given out at the festival:

- The City of Malmö Children’s Film Award
- The Church of Sweden Award
- Young People’s Film Award
- ECFA Award
- Region Skåne Short Film Award
- SVT’s Pitch Award
- Children’s Cinema of the Year
- Sydsvenskan and BUFF’s Award
- SF Bio Children’s Film
