= Brutality in Stone =

1961 film

- Directed by: Alexander Kluge; Peter Schamoni
- Written by: Alexander Kluge; Peter Schamoni
- Starring: Hans Clarin; Christian Marschall
- Release date: February 8, 1961
- Running time: 12 minutes
- Country: West Germany
- Language: German

Brutality in Stone (German: Brutalität in Stein) is a 1961 German documentary film directed by Alexander Kluge and Peter Schamoni. Produced at a time when German cinema preferred to forget the nation's Nazi past, the black and white film recalls the speeches and rallies of Adolf Hitler in a largely motionless setting.

== Background ==
Visually, the film focuses on the architecture of the ruined Nazi party rally grounds in Nuremberg. The film draws connections between the design of these structures and the ideology of National Socialism. Repetitive motifs, such as pillars and sharp corners, have particular visual prominence in the film. Art historian Hans-Ernst Mittig refers to the combative angles and lockstep orderliness of the structures as "architectural militarism" (German: architektonischer Militarismus), which reverberates in the film's audio of cheering crowds at Hitler's rallies.

Brutality in Stone premiered at what is now known as the International Short Film Festival Oberhausen in 1961 as an inaugural film of a "new generation" of German cinema.
