= Oberhausen Manifesto =

1962 declaration by 26 West German filmmakers

The Oberhausen Manifesto was a declaration by a group of 26 young West German filmmakers at the International Short Film Festival Oberhausen, North Rhine-Westphalia on 28 February 1962. The manifesto was a call to arms to establish a "new [West] German feature film". It was initiated by Haro Senft and among the signatories were the directors Alexander Kluge and Edgar Reitz. The manifesto was associated with the motto "Papas Kino ist tot" (Papa's cinema is dead), although this phrase does not appear in the manifesto itself.

== History ==
By the late 1950s West German screens were dominated by commercially safe Heimatfilme, lightweight comedies and musicals, leading many observers to complain of creative stagnation despite respectable box-office returns. The crisis became undeniable in 1961, when no domestic production was deemed worthy of the Bundesfilmpreis, prompting the federal interior minister to lament a “short, shallow flowering of tear-jerking entertainment.”

Against this backdrop a loose alliance of short-film directors known as DOC 59 convened a press conference titled Papas Kino ist tot during the Oberhausen festival on 28 February 1962, at which Ferdinand Khittl read the Manifesto while Alexander Kluge moderated the ensuing discussion.

Though the text contained no concrete programme, its polemical tone energised policymakers: three years later the Federal Interior Ministry created the Kuratorium junger deutscher Film, a funding body expressly designed to support first features by emerging directors.

The Manifesto’s emphasis on personal authorship and political relevance became defining principles of New German Cinema, whose breakthrough works—such as Kluge’s Abschied von gestern (1966) and Reitz’s Mahlzeiten (1966)—were routinely traced back to the Oberhausen moment in contemporary criticism.

== Contents ==
Running to roughly 150 German words, the Manifesto opens by declaring that the collapse of conventional German cinema has erased the economic basis for an obsolete mentality, thereby clearing the path for a “new kind of film.” It cites the international success of recent German short films as proof that the future lies with those already speaking “a new film language,” and it insists on freedom from industrial conventions, commercial partners and interest-group censorship as pre-conditions for artistic renewal. Concluding with the now-famous line Der alte Film ist tot. Wir glauben an den neuen, the signatories pledge to accept economic risks in pursuit of intellectually, formally and economically independent production.

== Signatories ==
The declaration carried twenty-six signatures drawn from directors, cinematographers, producers and one composer, collectively known as the Oberhausen Group. Their names are:

- Bodo Blüthner
- Boris von Borresholm
- Christian Doermer
- Bernhard Dörries
- Heinz Furchner
- Rob Houwer
- Ferdinand Khittl
- Alexander Kluge
- Pitt Koch
- Walter Krüttner
- Dieter Lemmel
- Hans Loeper
- Ronald Martini
- Hansjürgen Pohland
- Raimund Ruehl
- Edgar Reitz
- Peter Schamoni
- Detten Schleiermacher
- Fritz Schwennicke
- Haro Senft
- Franz-Josef Spieker
- Hans Rolf Strobel
- Heinz Tichawsky
- Wolfgang Urchs
- Herbert Vesely
- Wolf Wirth

The Oberhausen Group were awarded the Deutscher Filmpreis in 1982.

== Legacy ==
A second 'Oberhausen manifesto' was published in 1965, partly in reaction to perceptions of continued conservatism in the German film industry. Led by the radical French director Jean-Marie Straub, this declaration was also signed by Rudolf Thome, Dirk Alvermann, Klaus Lemke, Peter Nestler, Reinald Schnell, Dieter Süverkrüp, Kurt Ulrich, and Max Zihlmann.
