= Part-Time Work of a Domestic Slave =

- Directed by: Alexander Kluge
- Written by: Alexander Kluge
- Starring: Alexandra Kluge
- Release date: 1973
- Running time: 91 minutes
- Country: West Germany
- Language: German

Part-Time Work of a Domestic Slave (German: Gelegenheitsarbeit einer Sklavin) is a 1973 West German drama film directed by Alexander Kluge.

== Plot ==
Roswitha Bronski (Alexandra Kluge) is a nurse married to the chemical engineer Franz Bronski (Bion Steinborn), with whom she had three children. Since her husband does not work, devoting himself exclusively to studies with the intention of becoming a new genius of chemistry, Roswitha has to support her family by running an illegal abortion clinic. Facing the indifference of her husband, who believes that she is intellectually inferior, as well as the open hostility of doctors like Dr. Genée (Traugott Buhre), Roswitha receives a hard blow when her clinic is closed by police. From then on, she puts aside her passivity and begins a journey to redefine herself as mother, wife and working woman, part of a society threatened by an early globalization.

== Cast ==
- Alexandra Kluge as Roswitha Bronski
- Bion Steinborn as Franz Bronski
- Sylvia Gartmann as Sylvia
- Traugott Buhre as Dr. Genée
- Ursula Dirichs as Ms. Willek
- Alfred Edel as Factory security chief
