= Pierre Kandorfer =

American author and journalist

Pierre Antoine Kandorfer
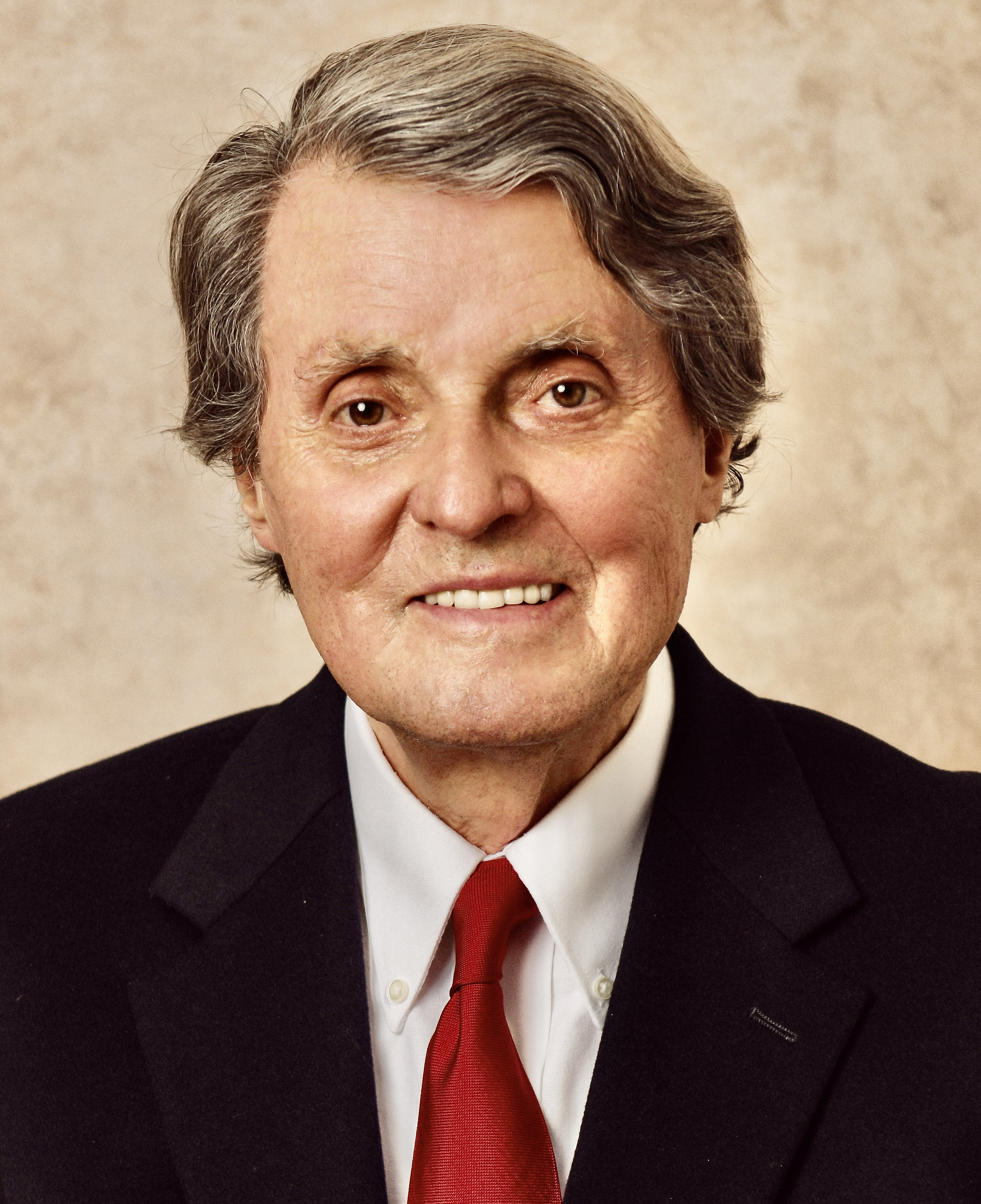
- Born: August 17, 1943 (age 83)
- Occupations: Author, journalist, TV anchor/producer/director
- Website: pierrekandorfer.com

Pierre Antoine Kandorfer (born August 17, 1943) is a German–American author and journalist. He is the founder of EuroChannel Broadcasting on ICN (International Channel Network Los Angeles).

== Background ==
Pierre taught at the FHS College in Düsseldorf, he published a series of books on theoretical work in Film and TV, such as “Practice of Science Films” (German edition). In 1980, he worked in the German film industry, he published his “Pocket Book of Movie Technology” (a publication series for the Institute of Film and Television Science, German edition).Since 1978, he has been releasing books with his “Textbook of Filmmaking” (German edition), published in 7 editions and used in many European film schools.

After working in Los Angeles, he relocated to the High Desert town of California City, where he produced a movie series focusing on a producing a movie in Red Rock Canyon. He served as director of European syndication for etv Hollywood Inc. and produced visual material for the NASA/ESA Spacelab mission. He also created the Special Assignment Series: Soccer World Cup for broadcast distribution. He founded EuroChannel Broadcasting on the International Channel Network in Los Angeles.

In 1970, he received the film prize in the category "Films of the Youth" at the International Short Film Festival in Oberhausen, Germany.

== Personal life ==
In 1998, Pierre lost his lifetime investments due to a fraud committed by a business partner. This forced him to sell his Los Angeles residence at a significant loss. Subsequently, he relocated to California City, where he continued producing a movie series at Red Rock Canyon.

== Selected works ==
- Kandorfer, Pierre A. Never Give Up Your Dream: Inspiration, motivation, persistence, and breakthrough. Independently published, 2023.ISBN 9798385 551910
- Kandorfer, Pierre A. Less Is More: Pathway to Happiness. Independently published, 2022.ISBN 1456654810
- Kandorfer, Pierre A. Fight Back Manual: Last Strategies for Survival of Western Civilization. Independently published, 2021.ISBN 1980486409
- Kandorfer, Pierre A. A Love Letter to America: The Secret of the American Spirit. Independently published, 2020.ISBN 979-8654326263
- Kandorfer, Pierre A. Textbook of Filmmaking, (Lehrbuch der Filmgestaltung, German edition), Schiele & Schön Verlag, 2010.ISBN 978-3-7949-0802-8
