= Franz-Josef Spieker =

- Born: November 24, 1933; Paderborn, Germany
- Died: March 18, 1978 (aged 44); Bali, Indonesia
- Education: German Institute for Film and Television
- Occupation: filmmaker

Franz-Josef Spieker (24 November 1933, Paderborn – 18 March 1978, near Bali) was a German filmmaker.

Spieker studied theater and literary sciences at the DIFF (German Institute for Film and Television) in Munich. He worked as a photojournalist and film critic and later became an assistant director of Géza von Radványi in 1957, Stanley Kubrick (Paths of Glory) and Douglas Sirk, as a production and editing assistant.

In 1958, he shot his first short film, and in 1962, he signed the Oberhausen Manifesto. In the same year, he participated in the anthology film Hütet eure Töchter! (Look After Your Daughters), a predecessor to the sex report film, with the producer Walter Koppel wanting to win over the signatories of the Manifesto.

Spieker became famous in 1967 with his first full-length feature film Wilder Reiter GmbH, a satire on stubbornness, which made him a hope-bearer of New German Cinema. The satire on Bundeswehr, With Oak Leaves and Fig Leaf and the social satire Kuckucksei im Gangsternest, while still acclaimed, but was not as popular as Wilder Reiter GmbH.

Spieker still made numerous short films and received the silver Deutscher Filmpreis in 1977 for Persönlichkeitstest on behalf of his production company, Cinema 80. He was found dead on the beaches of Bali. As a signatory of the Oberhausen Manifesto, he was posthumously honored with the gold Deutscher Filmpreis in 1982.

== Filmography ==
Feature films

- 1964: Hütet eure Töchter! (anthology film)
- 1967: Wilder Reiter GmbH
- 1968: With Oak Leaves and Fig Leaf
- 1969: Kuckucksei im Gangsternest
- 1970: Drücker (TV film)

Short films

- 1958: Menschen bei 30 Grad (documentary)
- 1958: El Salvador (documentary)
- 1958: Insel in der Sonne (documentary)
- 1959: Masken und Gesichter
- 1960: Alltag der 7. Muse
- 1961: Süden im Schatten
- 1963: Doppelkonzert
- 1964: Das Malschiff
- 1965: Salzburg Sight and Sound (documentary)
- 1972: Das Jodelsystem
- 1972: Abstraktes Echo
- 1973: Spuren und Kontakte (documentary)
- 1974: Pashupatinath Abendraga
- 1975: Straßenartisten
- 1977: Der Persönlichkeitstest
- 1978: Nirmala (unfinished)
