= Theodor W. Adorno Award =

German award

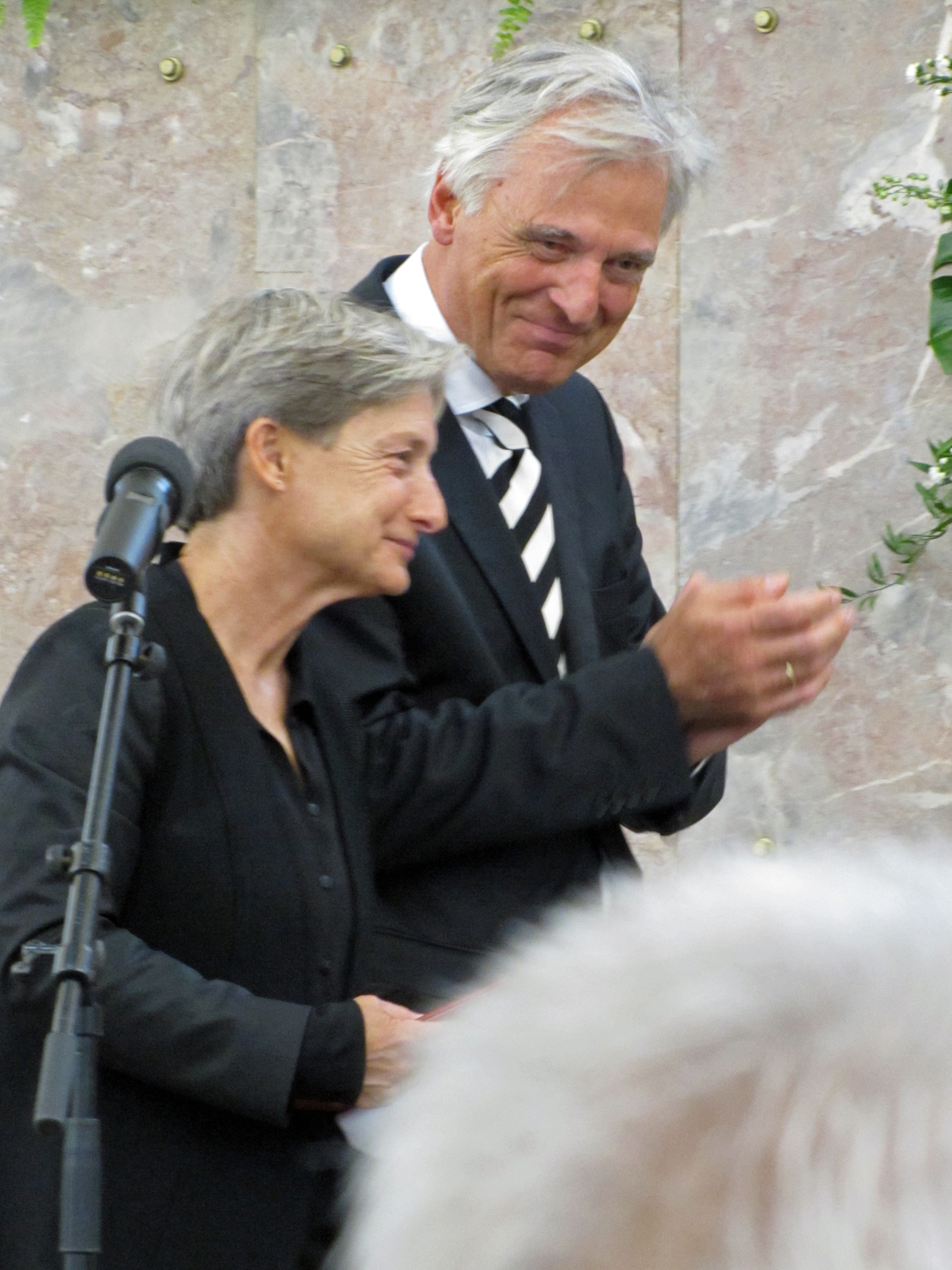
The prize is presented to Judith Butler in 2012

The Theodor W. Adorno Award (Theodor-W.-Adorno-Preis) is a German award intended to recognize outstanding achievement in philosophy, theatre, music and film. It was established by the city of Frankfurt in 1977 to commemorate the sociologist and philosopher Theodor Adorno, who had taught at the University of Frankfurt for twenty years. The award is conferred every three years on 11 September, Adorno's birthday. The prize money is 50,000 Euro.

== Laureates ==
- 1977: Norbert Elias (sociologist)
- 1980: Jürgen Habermas (sociologist)
- 1983: Günther Anders (philosopher)
- 1986: Michael Gielen (conductor)
- 1989: Leo Löwenthal (sociologist)
- 1992: Pierre Boulez (composer)
- 1995: Jean-Luc Godard (film director)
- 1998: Zygmunt Bauman (sociologist)
- 2001: Jacques Derrida (philosopher)
- 2003: György Ligeti (composer)
- 2006: Albrecht Wellmer (philosopher)
- 2009: Alexander Kluge (film director)
- 2012: Judith Butler (philosopher)
- 2015: Georges Didi-Huberman (art historian)
- 2018: Margarethe von Trotta (film director)
- 2021: Klaus Theweleit, (writer and cultural theorist)
- 2024: Seyla Benhabib (philosopher)
