= The Battle (Kluge novel) =

1964 novel by Alexander Kluge

The Battle (German: Schlachtbeschreibung) is a 1964 German novel by Alexander Kluge. The novel is a historical account of the Battle of Stalingrad in the form of an experimental montage of materials, including diary entries, government reports, and interviews.
