= Anita G. =

"Anita G." is a short story written by Alexander Kluge in 1962, which was adapted into the film Yesterday Girl in 1966.
