= International Short Film Festival Oberhausen =

Annual short film festival

Coordinates: 51°29′N 06°52′E

International Short Film Festival Oberhausen Internationale Kurzfilmtage Oberhausen
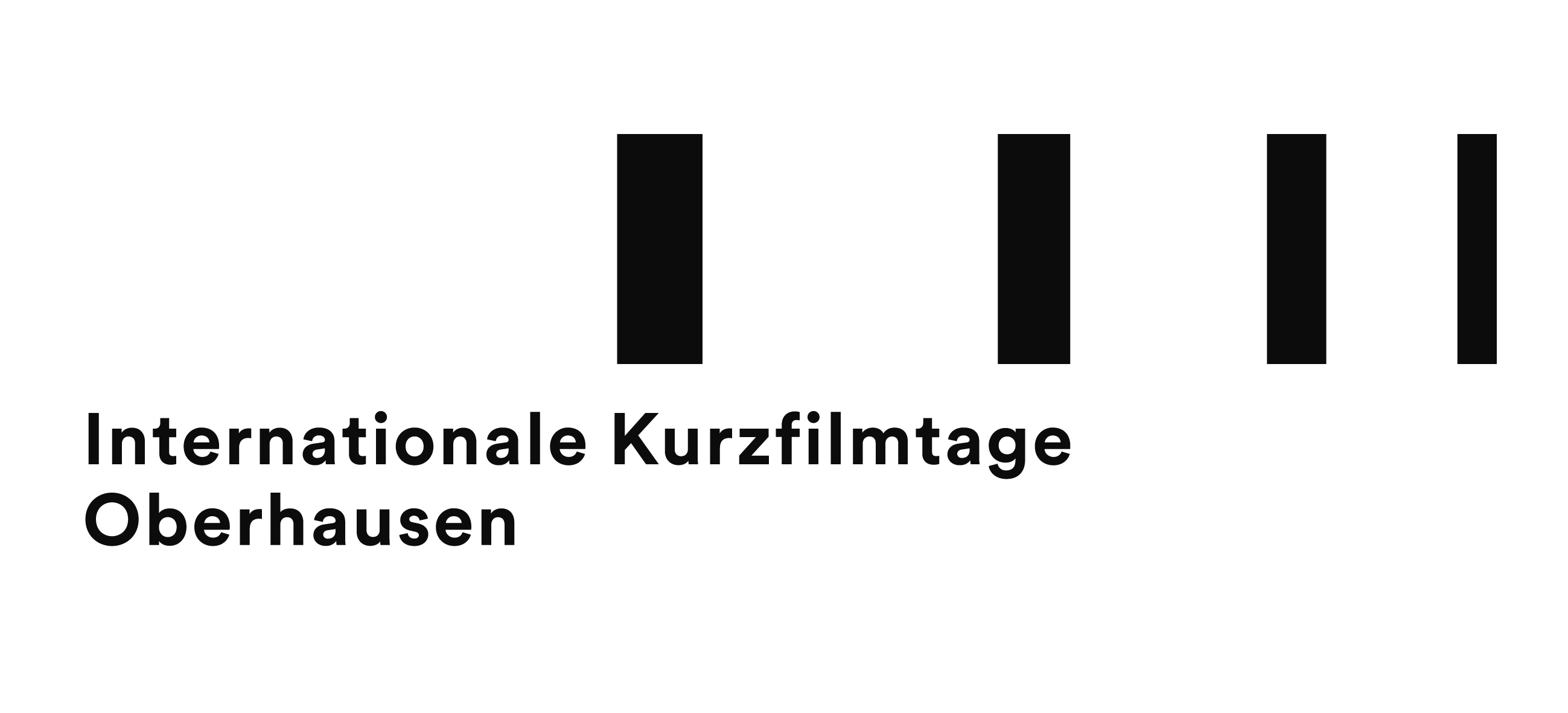
- Location: Oberhausen, Germany
- Founded: 1954 as Westdeutsche Kulturfilmtage; 1959 renamed as Westdeutsche Kurzfilmtage; 1991 renamed as Internationale Kurzfilmtage Oberhausen
- Film titles: Short films
- Hosted by: IKF gGmbH; City of Oberhausen
- Festival date: Held annually
- Website: www.kurzfilmtage.de/en/

The International Short Film Festival Oberhausen (Internationale Kurzfilmtage Oberhausen; formerly Westdeutsche Kulturfilmtage and then Westdeutsche Kurzfilmtage) is a German film festival for short films held in Oberhausen, North Rhine-Westphalia. Founded in 1954, it is one of the oldest short film festivals in the world and one of the major international platforms for the short form. The festival holds an International Competition, a German Competition, an International Children's and Youth Film Competition, the MuVi Award for best German music video, and, since 2009, the NRW Competition for productions from the state of North Rhine-Westphalia.

Oberhausen is known today for its extensive thematic programmes such as "Memories Can't Wait. Film without Film" (2014), "The Language of Attraction. Trailers between Advertising and the Avant-garde" (2019), "Solidarity as Disruption" (2021/22) and "Synchronize. Pan-African Film Networks" (2022). The festival also offers visitors a well-equipped video library, operates a non-commercial short-film distribution service, and owns an archive of short films from over 70 years of cinema history.

== History ==
=== 20th century ===
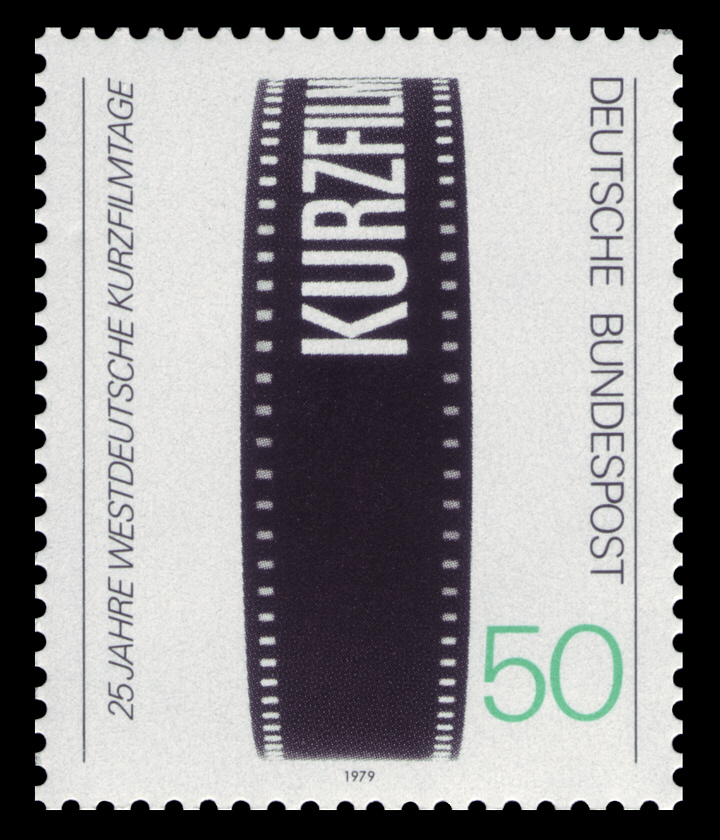
German stamp commemorating the festival's 25th anniversary (1979)

The Westdeutsche Kulturfilmtage (West German Cultural Film Festival) was founded in 1954 by the director of the Oberhausen Volkshochschule (adult education centre), Hilmar Hoffmann, in association with the Filmclub Oberhausen, under the name "1st West German Educational Film Festival". The event was initially geared toward fulfilling an educational policy mandate, and the motto chosen for the first festival was "Cultural Film – Route to Education". The inaugural edition featured 45 films from Germany, France, and the United States.

At the 4th West German Educational Film Festival in 1958, the motto "Way to the Neighbour" was introduced. In that year, 190 films from 29 countries were screened. In 1959, the festival was renamed to Westdeutsche Kurzfilmtage (West German Short Film Festival).

Oberhausen soon made a political name, chiefly because many films produced in the Eastern Bloc could only be viewed in Oberhausen. This situation led to the festival's rapid ascent and reputation as a "short film mecca". As early as the 1950s, however, visitors were also treated to works by young filmmakers from the West, such as François Truffaut, Norman McLaren, Alain Resnais, Bert Haanstra, and Lindsay Anderson.

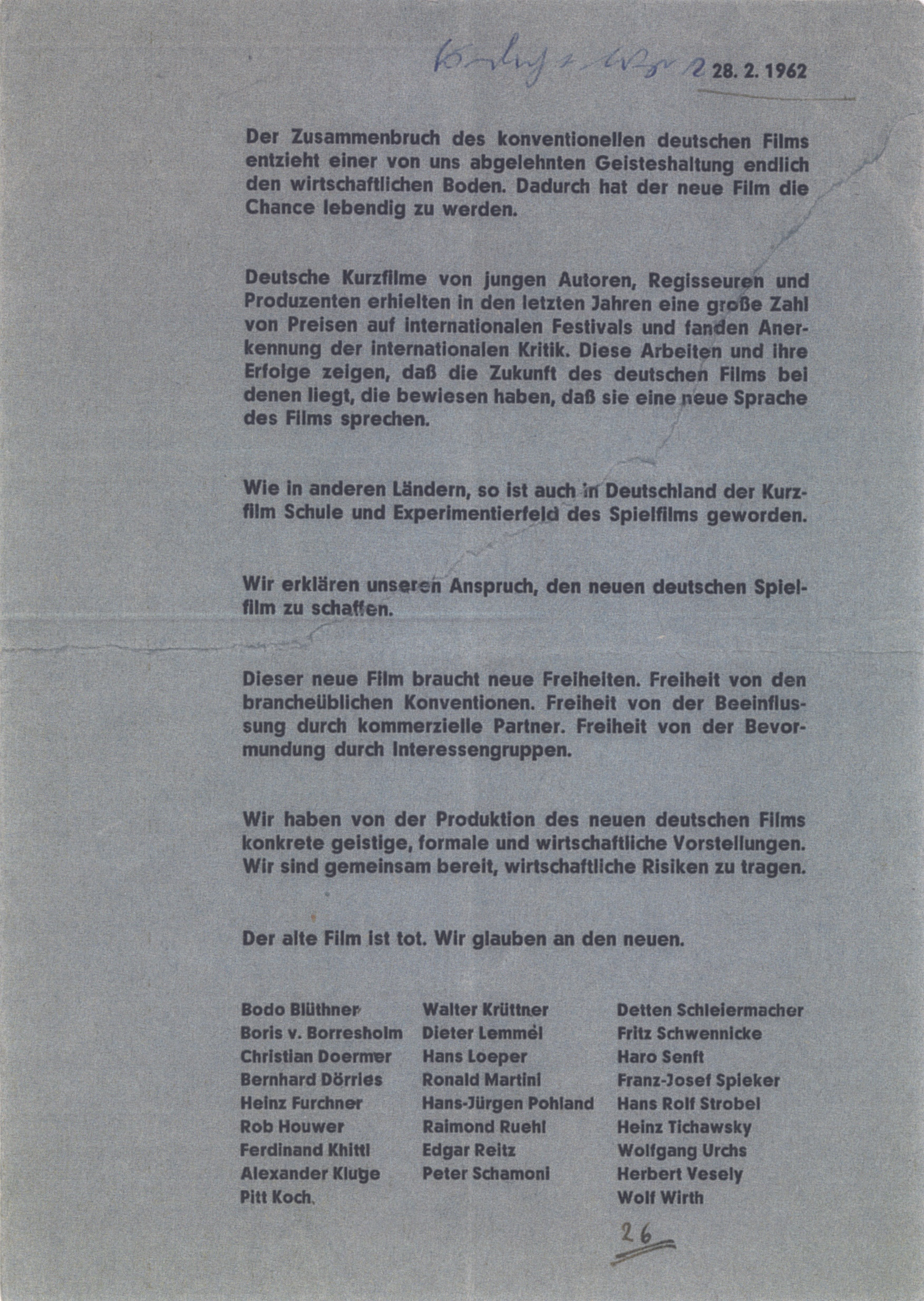
The Oberhausen Manifesto, proclaimed in 1962 at the 8th festival

At the eighth festival in 1962, a group of young German filmmakers, among them Alexander Kluge, Peter Schamoni, and Edgar Reitz, issued the "Oberhausen Manifesto", pronouncing the "old" film dead and declaring their aspiration to create a new kind of German film.

The 1960s then culminated in a 1968 scandal surrounding Hellmuth Costard's film Besonders wertvoll, in which a talking penis criticized the new Film Funding Act 1967. Responding to an objection issued by the public prosecutor's office, the festival removed the film from the official programme, after which many German filmmakers withdrew their works. Oberhausen emerged from the crisis with an amended set of regulations, including a public selection procedure for German films.

In the 1970s, the women's movement was a touchstone at the festival, with young filmmakers such as Chantal Akerman and Helma Sanders-Brahms showing their first films in Oberhausen. The festival inaugurated a new competition category in 1978, Children's and Youth Cinema. The 1970s also witnessed a wave of new festivals: ousted from the cinema, the short form found new screening options in the festival arena.

In the late 1980s, video and new media gradually emerged at Oberhausen. With the subsidence of the East/West conflict that had shaped the festival's early years, its role as a "window to the East" slowly faded. Now, the festival's profile as mediator and trailblazer between the worlds of short film and advertising clip, music video, industrial film, and video art – often subsumed under the generic term avant-garde – came to the fore.

In 1991, the festival was renamed the International Short Film Festival Oberhausen, the name it still bears today. That same year, Oberhausen introduced the nation's first competition for German short films. Since 1993, the festival has given film and video equal standing in its competitions. In 1999, Oberhausen introduced the first film festival award for music videos anywhere in the world, known as the "MuVi", which is still today awarded exclusively to directors for the visual quality of their clips. With the rise of video art, more and more films made by artists have found their way into festival programmes.

=== 21st century ===
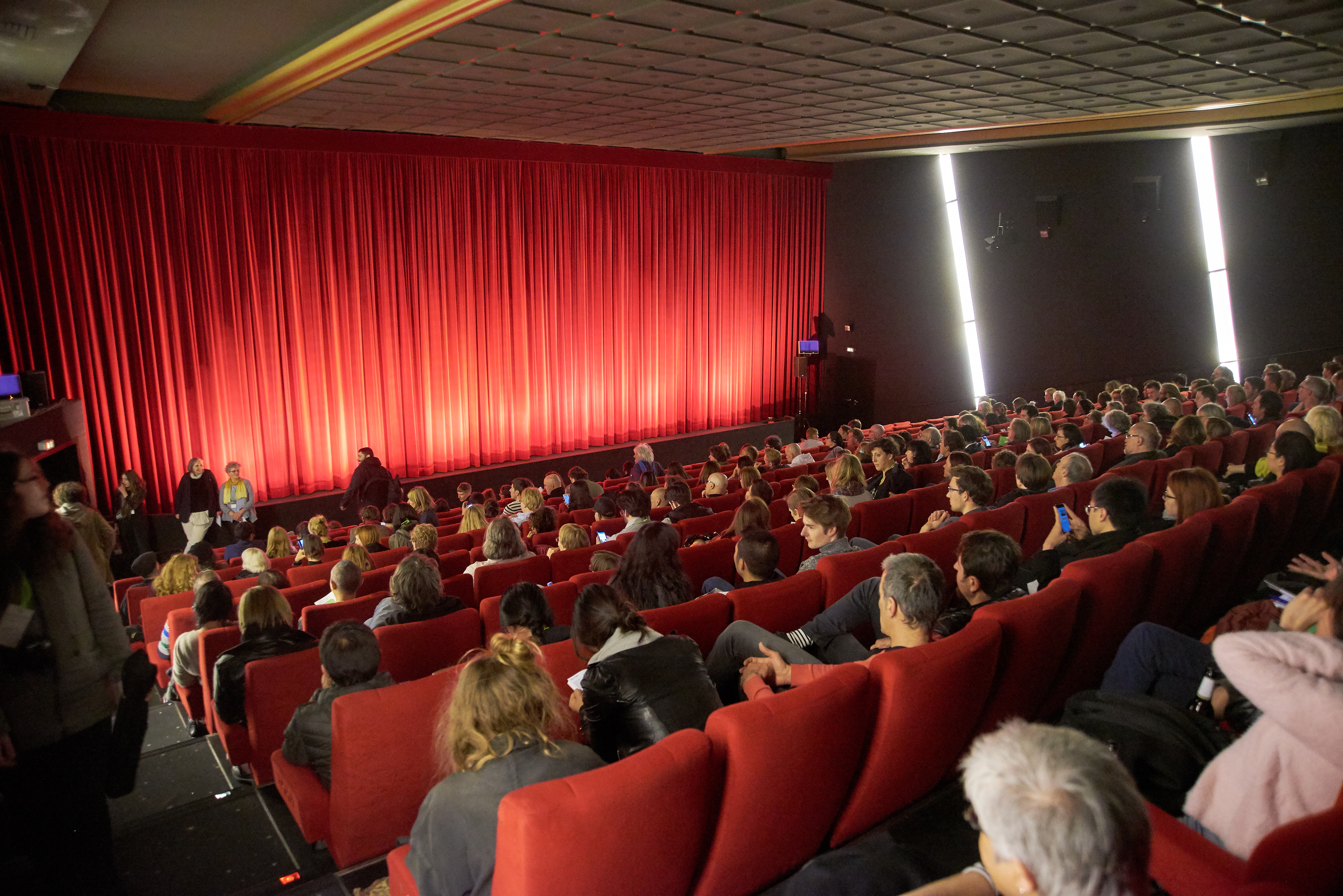
Festival cinema Lichtburg Oberhausen at the 2019 edition

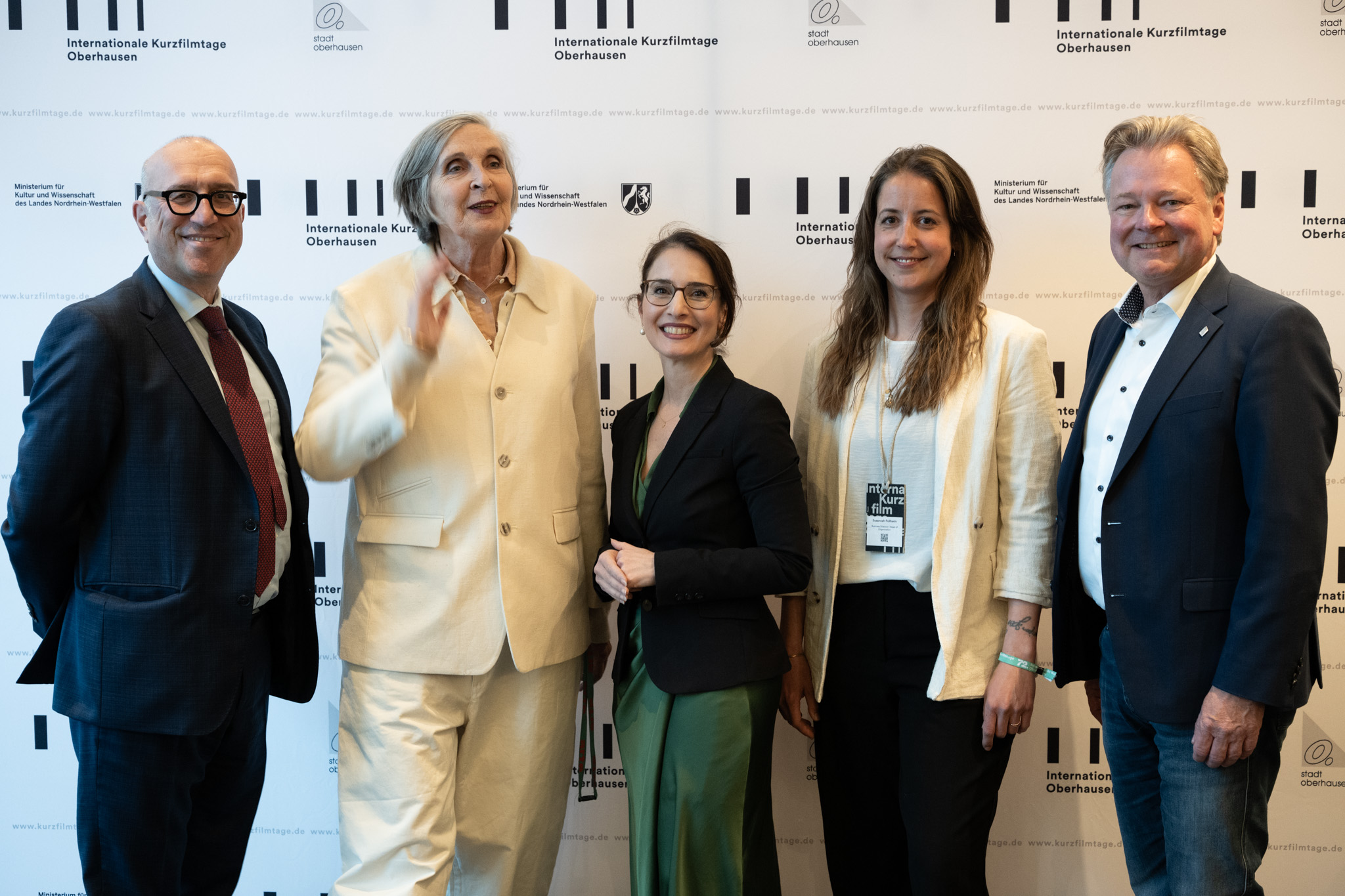
Opening of the 72. Kurzfilmtage 2026: v. l. n. r. Apostolos Tsalastras, Madeleine Bernstorff, Gonca Türkeli-Dehnert, Susannah Pollheim, Thorsten Berg

Due to the COVID-19 pandemic in 2020, the festival organised its 66th edition entirely online, making it the first exclusively digital film festival in Germany. With over 2,500 festival passes sold and users in nearly 100 countries, the new format proved far more successful than expected. Another all-digital festival edition followed in 2021: the 67th International Short Film Festival Oberhausen took place online from 1 to 10 May 2021. In ten days, the festival was almost double its usual length, and presented three new online competitions for the first time (International Online Competition, German Online Competition, and Muvi International Award).

In 2022, the festival returned to the cinemas with a hybrid edition, playing exclusively online from 29 April to 3 May and in the cinemas from 4 to 10 May. In 2023, the festival played exclusively in the cinemas again (26 April - 1 May).

=== Festival directors ===
Directors of the festival have included:

- 1954–1970: Hilmar Hoffmann
- 1971–1975: Will Wehling
- 1975–1985: Wolfgang J. Ruf
- 1985–1990: Karola Gramann
- 1990–1997: Angela Haardt
- 1997–2024: Lars Henrik Gass
- 2025-: Madeleine Bernstorff and Susannah Pollheim

== Description ==
Oberhausen presents short films and videos from various formal, cultural and social backgrounds. Large-scale special programmes take up a different theme each year, such as "The Language of Attraction. Trailers between Advertising and the Avant-garde" (2019), "Solidarity as Disruption" (2021/22), "Against Gravity. The Art of Machinima." (2023) or "The Long Way to the Neighbour. GDR Films in Oberhausen" (2025).

The festival also maintains a video library featuring a large selection of recent international short films, regularly mounts, among others, profile programmes dedicated to individual artists and market screenings for international distributors of avant-garde film, and each year, hosts a discussion series called "Podium".

The Festival is a qualifying festival for the short film Academy Awards and the BAFTA Awards. It is also a nominating festival for the European Film Prize; in addition, an expert jury annually nominates a children's film for the ECFA (European Children's Film Association) Short Film Award. Accredited by the FIAPF since 1960, it is also a reference festival of the Academy of Motion Picture Arts and Sciences.

Besides organizing the festival, Oberhausen operates a non-commercial short film distribution service, and its archive holds short films from over 70 years of film history.

== Careers ==
During the long history of the Oberhausen festival, many careers got off to a successful start.

I smoked my first cigarette here. For years, I saw every single film at the Westdeutsche Kurzfilmtage, looking forward to those days in Oberhausen every year. These events were important for me, for my decision to become a filmmaker.

— Wim Wenders

Short film is a great first step for a budding filmmaker. That’s how I made my beginnings, and Oberhausen was an important step on my path to become a director.

— Roman Polanski

Other filmmakers and artists who showed their early works at Oberhausen include:

- Eija-Liisa Ahtila
- Doug Aitken
- Kenneth Anger
- Andrea Arnold
- Jürgen Böttcher
- Stan Brakhage
- Vera Chytilová
- Valie Export
- Miloš Forman
- Werner Herzog
- Christoph Hochhäusler
- Hermine Huntgeburth
- Joris Ivens
- Isaac Julien
- Miranda July
- Romuald Karmakar
- Jochen Kuhn
- Jan Lenica
- Chris Marker
- Bjørn Melhus
- Dore O.
- Roman Polanski
- Pipilotti Rist
- Christoph Schlingensief
- Martin Scorsese
- C.J. Obasi
- István Szabó
- Agnès Varda
- Adolf Winkelmann
- Kleber Mendonça Filho
- Chantal Akerman

== Timeline ==
- 1954: Founded as Westdeutsche Kulturfilmtage
- 1958: Introduction of the motto "Weg zum Nachbarn"
- 1959: Renamed as Westdeutsche Kurzfilmtage
- 1962: Oberhausen Manifesto
- 1970: First computer-animated film
- 1989: Introduction of a video section
- 1991: Renamed as Internationale Kurzfilmtage Oberhausen; launch of the first German short film competition ever
- 1993: All competitions are opened for video productions to compete on an equal footing with film
- 1999: First film festival music video award in the world introduced
- 2002: Co-founder of the AG Kurzfilm e.v., the lobbying organisation for German short film
- 2019: Co-founder of AG Filmfestival, the lobbying organisation for German film festivals
