= Alexander Kluge =

German author, film director and public intellectual (1932–2026)

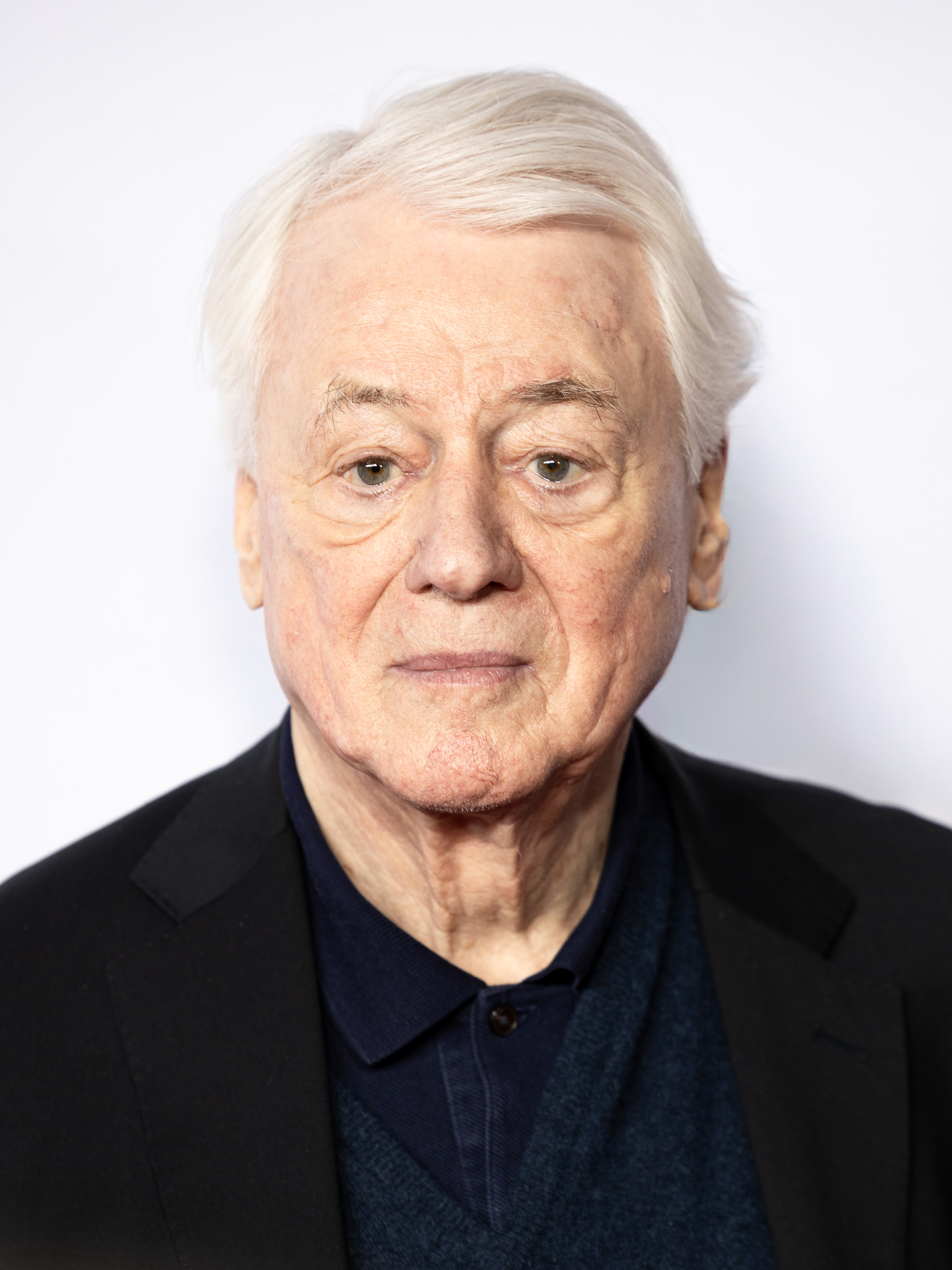
- Kluge in 2020
- Born: 14 February 1932; Halberstadt, Saxony, Prussia, Germany
- Died: 25 March 2026 (aged 94); Munich, Bavaria, Germany
- Education: University of Marburg; University of Frankfurt
- Occupations: Author; Film director; Media manager; Academic teacher
- Organizations: Ulm School of Design; DCTP
- Relatives: Alexandra Kluge (sister)
- Awards: Georg Büchner Prize; Theodor W. Adorno Award; Grimme-Preis; Heinrich Heine Prize
- Website: kluge-alexander.de

Signature
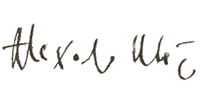

Alexander Ernst Kluge (14 February 1932 – 25 March 2026) was a German author, film director, academic and founder of a television production company.

After studies with Theodor W. Adorno in Frankfurt, he worked as an assistant to Fritz Lang for The Tiger of Eschnapur. He directed his first film, Brutality in Stone, in 1960, a short montage dealing with the Nazi era. He became instrumental in New German Cinema, establishing an institute for film at the Hochschule für Gestaltung Ulm. Among his signature films are Artists under the Big Top: Perplexed (1968) and The Assault of the Present on the Rest of Time (1985). In 1987 Kluge founded the television production company DCTP, producing for private television.

As an author, he focused on short stories. His major works of social criticism include Öffentlichkeit und Erfahrung, translated as Public Sphere and Experience, co-written with Oskar Negt and first published in 1972. He was a professor in Frankfurt from 1973. Kluge received major literary awards including the Georg Büchner Prize and the Grimme-Preis for his lifetime achievement in television.

== Early life, education and early career ==
Kluge was born in Halberstadt on 14 February 1932, the son of a country physician. He grew up during World War II and was drafted to the Volkssturm in 1944. He witnessed the bombing of his hometown on 8 April 1945. He studied history, law and church music at the University of Marburg and in Frankfurt. He received his doctorate in law in 1956.

While studying in Frankfurt, Kluge befriended the philosopher Theodor W. Adorno, who was teaching at the Institute for Social Research, or Frankfurt School. Kluge served as a legal counsel for the institute, and began writing his earliest stories during this period. At Adorno's suggestion, he also began to investigate filmmaking, and in 1958, Adorno introduced him to German filmmaker Fritz Lang, for whom Kluge worked as an assistant on The Tiger of Eschnapur.

== Cinematic works ==
In 1960, Kluge directed his first film, Brutality in Stone, a 12-minute, black-and-white, lyrical montage work that, defying the German commercial cinematic amnesia of the previous decade, inaugurated an exploration of the Nazi era. The film premiered in 1961 at what became the showcase for the new generation of German filmmakers, the Westdeutsche Kurzfilmtage in Oberhausen.

Kluge was one of 26 signatories to the Oberhausen Manifesto of 1962, which marked the launch of the New German Cinema. Also in 1962, Kluge and filmmakers Edgar Reitz and Detlev Schleiermacher established the Institut für Filmgestaltung at the Hochschule für Gestaltung Ulm, to promote the critical and aesthetic practices of Neuer Deutscher Film and Autorenfilm. In 1965 he was a member of the jury at the 15th Berlin International Film Festival.

Kluge directed several films that critique commercial cinema and television by creating a counter-public sphere and using experimental forms, including montage. His first feature film, Abschied von Gestern (Yesterday Girl), an adaptation of his story "Anita G.", was the first film after World War II by a German director to receive the Silver Lion of the Venice Film Festival. Die Artisten in der Zirkuskuppel: ratlos (Artists under the Big Top: Perplexed) was the first such film to receive the Golden Lion. Another signature film, released in 1985, is Der Angriff der Gegenwart auf die übrige Zeit (The Assault of the Present on the Rest of Time).

Kluge and his studio are featured in Sarah Morris's 2017 film Finite and Infinite Games. The film focuses on the Elbphilharmonie in Hamburg, and includes debate between Kluge and Morris on architecture, music, and the religious philosophy of American academic James P. Carse.

In 2025, Kluge's debut feature film, Primitive Diversity, was featured in the harbour section of the 54th International Film Festival Rotterdam.

== Television work ==
In 1987, Kluge founded the television production company Development Company for Television Program (DCTP), which produces late-night and nighttime independent television slots on the private channels RTL Television, Sat.1, and VOX.

Many of the DCTP programs consist of television documentaries by Kluge (often characterized by lack of spoken narration and heavy reliance on text as well as graphical montages and image editing) and interviews by Kluge of various international personalities from the fields of arts, entertainment, science, philosophy, and politics. Some of the interviewees are fictional characters portrayed by professional actors Helge Schneider and Peter Berling, or factual people parodied by the two, including Adolf Hitler, historical Roman generals, Napoleon's political advisors, and Michael Jackson's lawyer.

Beside Kluge's own productions, DCTP also co-produces so-called Magazinsendungen, investigatory programs in cooperation with Der Spiegel (SPIEGEL TV), Stern (stern TV), Süddeutsche Zeitung (Süddeutsche TV), Neue Zürcher Zeitung (NZZ Format), and the British Broadcasting Corporation.

== Literary works ==
Kluge was one of the major German fiction writers of the late 20th century and an important social critic. He was a member of the Group 47 from 1962, promoting new literature after World War II.

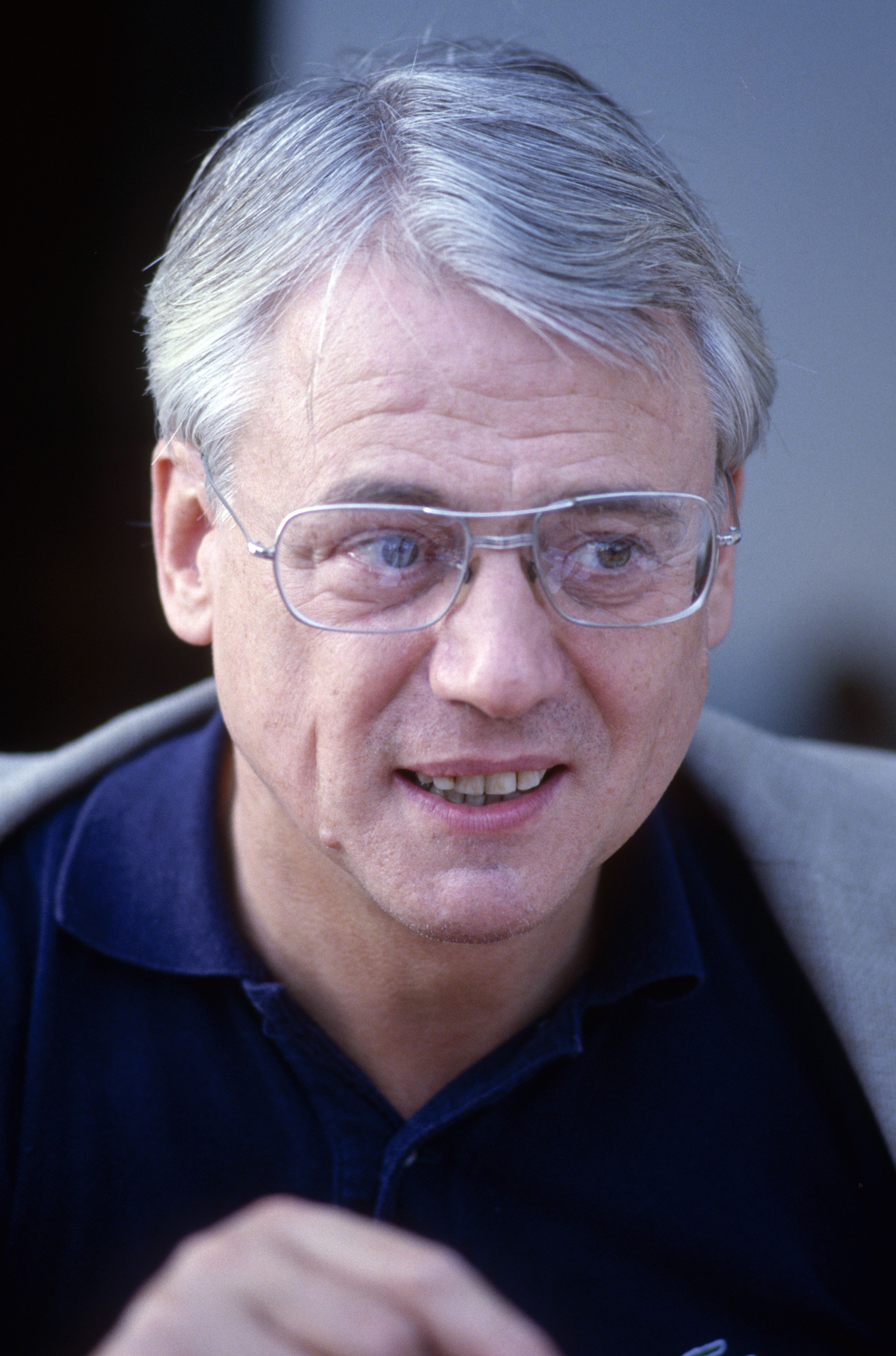
Kluge in 1986

His fictional works, which tend toward the short story form, are significant for their formal experimentation and insistently critical themes. Constituting a form of analytical fiction, analyzing the social, historical, and ideological forces inside the story, they use techniques of narrative disruption, mixed genres, interpolation of non-literary texts and documents, and shifts of perspective. They often have a flat, ironic tone. A recurring effect approximates what Viktor Shklovsky and the Russian formalists identified as defamiliarization or ostranenie. In an interview with 032c magazine, Kluge quoted Georg Büchner: "I've always wanted to see what my head looks like from above." He explained: "writing literary texts, you look—if you're going about it correctly—down to yourself, to your head from above. Then you no longer have a relationship with yourself. At the most, you have trust in yourself that a text will emerge from this and that you still have the sovereignty and the strength to throw it away if it amounts to nothing." Kluge has used several of his stories as the basis for his films.

Kluge's major works of social criticism include Öffentlichkeit und Erfahrung. Zur Organisationsanalyse von bürgerlicher und proletarischer Öffentlichkeit, co-written with Oskar Negt and originally published in 1972, and "Geschichte und Eigensinn", also co-authored with Negt. Öffentlichkeit und Erfahrung has been translated into English as Public Sphere and Experience: Toward an Analysis of the Bourgeois and Proletarian Public Sphere and Geschichte und Eigensinn was translated into English as History and Obstinacy, published in 2014 by Zone Books.

Public Sphere and Experience revisits and expands Jürgen Habermas's notion of the public sphere (articulated in his book Structural Transformation of the Public Sphere) and calls for the development of a new "proletarian public sphere" grounded in the life experience of the working class. History and Obstinacy continues this project, tries to rethink the nature of proletarian experience, and develops a theory of "living labour" grounded in the work of Karl Marx.

Kluge published numerous texts on literary, film and television criticism. In discussing his literary technique of blending fiction and reality with author Gary Indiana, Kluge also offered a critique of the media industry's presentation of "reality", which he asserted is intrinsically false:

...Human beings are not interested in reality. They can't be; it's the human essence. They have wishes. These wishes are strictly opposed to any ugly form of reality. They prefer to lie than to become divorced from their wishes...[they] forget everything and can give up everything except this principle of misunderstanding reality, the subjective... If this is real, then the media industry is realistic in telling fiction, and the construction of reality founded on this basis can only lie. This is one of the reasons why history isn't realistic: it's not documentary, it's not genuine, and it's not necessary.

Learning Processes with a Deadly Outcome (1973) is one of Kluge's contributions to the science-fiction genre. In 2000, he published Chronik der Gefühle (Chronicle of Feelings), which critic Matthew D. Miller called a "modern epic". From 2016 Kluge collaborated with the American writer Ben Lerner. Their collaborations are collected in The Snows of Venice, published in 2018 by Spector Books.

He taught from 1973 as professor at the Frankfurt University, where he also held poetry lectures in 2012.

== Personal life ==
Kluge's sister, Alexandra Kluge, was a film actress, who collaborated with him in film work.

Kluge died in Munich on 25 March 2026, at the age of 94.

== Awards and honours ==
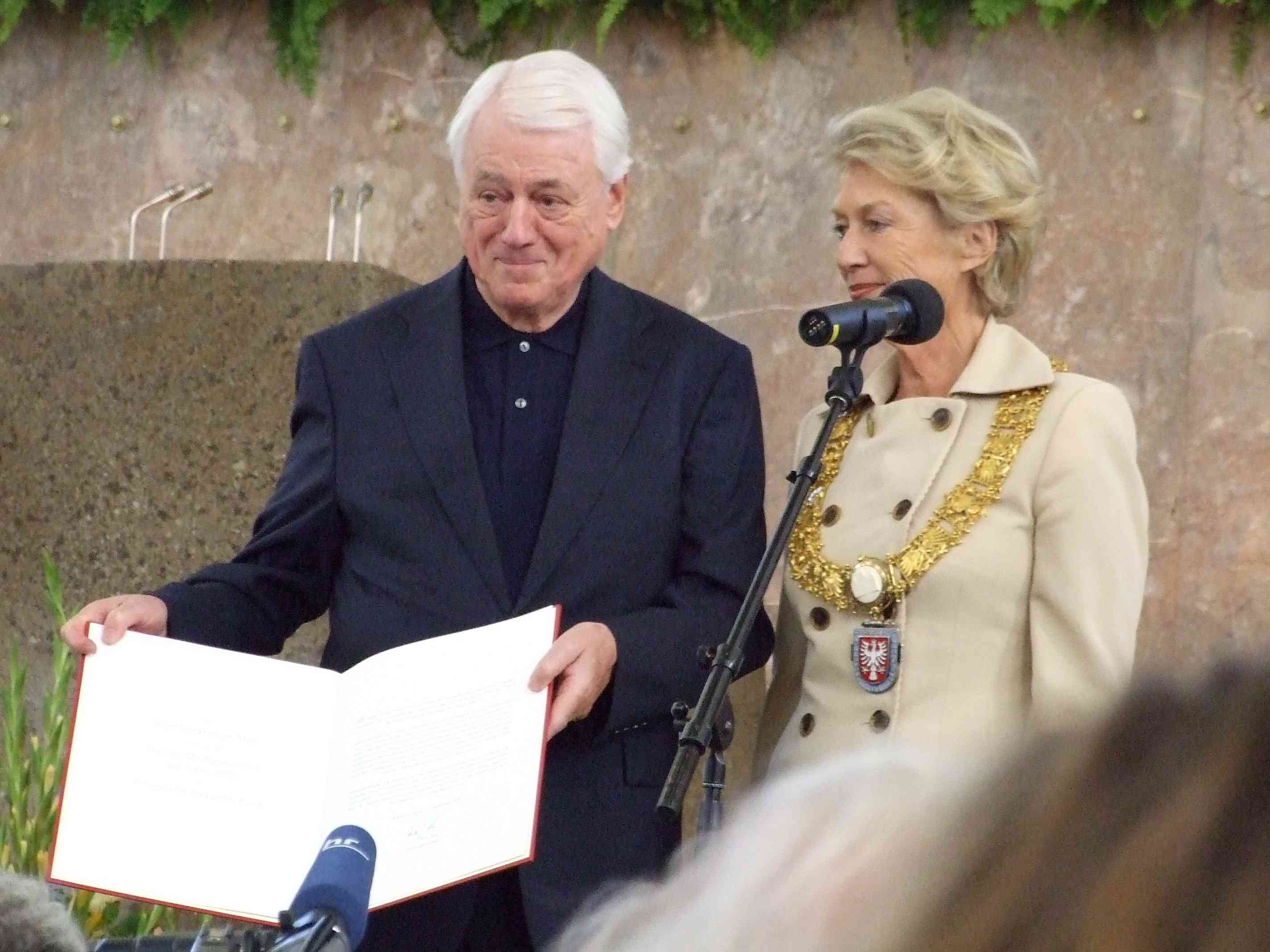
Receiving the 2009 Theodor W. Adorno Award from mayor Petra Roth

His awards include the Premio letterario Elba (1967), and almost every major German-language literary prize, including the Heinrich von Kleist Prize (1985), the Heinrich-Böll-Preis (1993) and the Schiller Memorial Prize (2001). Kluge received the Hanns-Joachim-Friedrichs-Award for TV Journalism (2001). He has also received the Georg Büchner Prize (2003), Germany's highest literary award. Kluge received the triennial Theodor W. Adorno Award in 2009. In 2010 Kluge was awarded the Grimme-Preis, one of the most important German television awards, in honour of his lifetime achievement. He was awarded the Heinrich Heine Prize in 2014, the Klopstock Prize in 2019, and the Pour le Mérite for Sciences and Arts in 2024.

== Selected filmography ==
- 1966 Yesterday Girl (director and screenwriter)
- 1968 Artists Under the Big Top: Perplexed (director, producer and screenwriter)
- 1971 The Big Mess (director, producer and screenwriter)
- 1973 Part-Time Work of a Domestic Slave (director and screenwriter)
- 1974 In Danger and Deep Distress, the Middleway Spells Certain Death (co-director: Edgar Reitz)
- 1976 Strongman Ferdinand (director, narrator, producer and screenwriter)
- 1978 Germany in Autumn (director and screenwriter, along with three other filmmakers)
- 1979 The Patriotic Woman (director and producer)
- 1980 The Candidate (director)
- 1982 Biermann-Film (director)
- 1982 War and Peace (director and screenwriter (adapted from his book))
- 1983 The Power of Emotion (director, narrator, producer and screenwriter)
- 1985 Vermischte Nachrichten (director, producer and screenwriter)
- 1986 The Blind Director (director and screenwriter)
- 1989 C*A*S*H: A Political Fairy Tale (producer)
- 1995 Die Nacht der Regisseure (actor – as himself (uncredited))
- 2008 Nachrichten aus der ideologischen Antike: Marx – Eisenstein – Das Kapital (director and screenwriter)
- 2025 Primitive Diversity (director and producer)

== Selected bibliography ==
- Die Universitäts-Selbstverwaltung. Ihre Geschichte und gegenwärtige Rechtsform (1958). (dissertation)
- Lebensläufe (1962). Lifespan Narratives. This collection of nine stories includes "Anita G.", which Kluge adapted into the film Yesterday Girl.
  - First translated as Attendance List for a Funeral: Eleven Stories by Leila Vennewitz (1966); this was later reprinted as Case Histories (1988). Vennewitz's translation does not include "Korti" and includes three additional stories not in the original German collection: "Attendance List for a Funeral", "Sergeant Major Hans Peickert", and "Mandorf".
  - Vennewitz's translation was expanded to include "Korti" in 2025 by Alexander Booth as Lifespan Narratives: Ten Stories from a Time of Disruption (Chronicle of Emotions, Notebook 3), but does not include "Attendance List for a Funeral" or "Mandorf".
- Schlachtbeschreibung (1964). The Battle, trans. Leila Vennewitz (1967). ISBN 978-0-373-02929-7.
- Öffentlichkeit und Erfahrung – Zur Organisationsanalyse von bürgerlicher und proletarischer Öffentlichkeit (with Oskar Negt) (1972). Public Sphere and Experience: Analysis of the Bourgeois and Proletarian Public, trans. Peter Labany, Jamie Owen Daniel, and Assenka Oksiloff (Verso Books, 2016).
- Lernprozesse mit tödlichem Ausgang (1973). Learning Processes with a Deadly Outcome, trans. Christopher Pavsek (Duke University Press, 1996).
- Gelegenheitsarbeit einer Sklavin. Zur realistischen Methode (1975).
- Neue Geschichten, Hefte 1–18. "Unheimlichkeit der Zeit" (1977). New Stories, Notebooks 1–18: "The Uncanniness of Time". A collection of several hundred stories, some only one-page long, interspersed with documents, charts and images.
- Die Patriotin. Texte/Bilder 1–6 (1979).
- Geschichte und Eigensinn (with Oskar Negt) (1981).
  - History and Obstinacy, trans. Richard Langston, ed. and with an introduction by Devin Fore (Zone Books, 2014). ISBN 978-1-935408-46-8.
- Die Macht der Gefühle (1984). The Power of Feelings.
- Maßverhältnisse des Politischen (with Oskar Negt) (1992).
- Die Wächter des Sarkophags. 10 Jahre Tschernobyl (1996).
- In Gefahr und größter Not bringt der Mittelweg den Tod. Texte zu Kino, Film, Politik (1999).
- Chronik der Gefühle (2000). Chronicle of Emotions. In two volumes: Basisgeschichten and Lebensläufe. The first volume includes Schlachtbeschreibung (1964), in addition to a large amount of new material. The second volume includes Unheimlichkeit der Zeit (1977); Lernprozesse mit tödlichem Ausgang (1973); and Lebensläufe (1962).
  - The Principles of Life on Black Friday (Chronicle of Emotions, Notebook 1), trans. Martin Chalmers and Richard Langston (Seagull Books, 2023).
  - The Long March of Basic Trust (Chronicle of Emotions, Notebook 2), trans. Alexander Booth (Seagull Books, 2025).
  - Lifespan Narratives: Ten Stories from a Time of Disruption (Chronicle of Emotions, Notebook 3), trans. Leila Vennewitz and Alexander Booth (Seagull Books, 2025).
- Der unterschätzte Mensch (with Oskar Negt) (2001). The Undervalued Man. In two volumes. The first book includes: Suchbegriffe (26 conversations and interviews); Öffentlichkeit und Erfahrung; and Maßverhältnisse des Politischen (revised). The second book is Geschichte und Eigensinn.
- Verdeckte Ermittlung (2001).
- Die Kunst, Unterschiede zu machen (2003).
- Die Lücke, die der Teufel lässt. Im Umfeld des neuen Jahrhunderts (2003). The Devil's Blind Spot, trans. Martin Chalmers and Michael Hulse (New Directions, 2004). This collection of 500 stories includes some earlier works; an abridged English-language translation appeared in 2004 containing 173 of the 500 stories.
- Vom Nutzen ungelöster Probleme (2003).
- Fontane – Kleist – Deutschland – Büchner: Zur Grammatik der Zeit (2004).
- Tür an Tür mit einem anderen Leben. 350 neue Geschichten (2006).
- Geschichten vom Kino (2007). Cinema Stories, trans. Martin Brady and Helen Hughes (New Directions, 2007).
- Der Luftangriff auf Halberstadt am 8. April 1945 (2008). Air Raid, trans. Martin Chalmers (Seagull Books, 2012).
- Soll und Haben. Fernsehgespräche (with Joseph Vogl) (2009).
- Das Labyrinth der zärtlichen Kraft. 166 Liebesgeschichten (2009). The Labyrinth of Tender Force: 166 Love Stories, trans. Wieland Hoban (Seagull Books, 2019).
- Dezember (with Gerhard Richter) (2010). December, trans. Martin Chalmers (Seagull Books, 2012).
- Das Bohren harter Bretter. 133 politische Geschichten (2011). Drilling Through Hard Boards: 133 Political Stories, trans. Wieland Hoban (Seagull Books, 2017).
- Das fünfte Buch: Neue Lebensläufe. 402 Geschichten (2012).
- Personen und Reden (2012).
- Die Entsprechung einer Oase. Essay für die digitale Generation (2013). ISBN 978-3-944543-01-7
- "Wer ein Wort des Trostes spricht, ist ein Verräter." 48 Geschichten für Fritz Bauer (2013). Anyone Who Utters a Consoling Word Is a Traitor: 48 Stories for Fritz Bauer, trans. Alta L. Price (Seagull Books, 2020).
- Nachricht von ruhigen Momenten (with Gerhard Richter) (2013). Dispatches from Moments of Calm, trans. Nathaniel McBride (Seagull Books, 2016).
- 30. April 1945 (with Reinhard Jirgl) (2014). 30 April 1945: The Day Hitler Shot Himself and Germany's Integration with the West Began, trans. Wieland Hoban and Iain Galbraith (Seagull Books, 2015).
- Le Moment fugitif (2014).
- Kongs große Stunde. Chronik des Zusammenhangs (2015). Kong's Finest Hour: A Chronicle of Connections (Seagull Books, 2021).
- Ferngespräche. Über Eisenstein, Marx, das Kapital, die Liebe und die Macht der zärtlichen Kraft (with Rainer Stollmann) (2016).
- Weltverändernder Zorn: Nachricht von den Gegenfüßlern (with Georg Baselitz) (2017). World-Changing Rage: News of the Antipodeans, trans. Katy Derbyshire (Seagull Books, 2019).
- Schnee über Venedig (with Ben Lerner) (2018). The Snows of Venice (2018).
- Russland-Kontainer (2020). Russia Container, trans. Alexander Booth (Seagull Books, 2022).
- Trotzdem (with Ferdinand von Schirach) (2020).
- Senkblei der Geschichten (with Joseph Vogl) (2020).
- Zirkus / Kommentar (2022). Circus / Commentary, trans. Alexander Booth (Seagull Books, 2024).
- Das Buch der Kommentare. Unruhiger Garten der Seele (2022). The Book of Commentary / Unquiet Garden of the Soul, trans. Alexander Booth (Seagull Books, 2023).
- Kriegsfibel 2023 (2023). War Primer, trans. Alexander Booth (Seagull Books, 2024)
- Der Konjunktiv der Bilder: Meine virtuelle Kamera (K.I.) (2024). The Dragon-Fly's Eye: My Virtual Camera, trans. Alexander Booth (Spector Books, 2024).
- Klugheit ist die Kunst, unter verschiedenen Umständen getreu zu bleiben, with Anselm Kiefer (2024). Intelligence Is the Art of Remaining Faithful under Shifting Circumstances, trans. Alexander Booth (Seagull Books, forthcoming)

=== Compilations in English ===
- Alexander Kluge: Theoretical Writings, Stories, and an Interview. October, Vol. 46 (1988).
- (editor) Forrest, Tara (June 2012). Forrest, Tara (ed.). Alexander Kluge: Raw Materials for the Imagination. Amsterdam University Press. p. 450. doi:10.1515/9789048513390. ISBN 978-90-8964-273-8.
- Temple of the Scapegoat: Opera Stories (New Directions, 2018)
- Difference and Orientation: An Alexander Kluge Reader. Edited by Richard Langston (Cornell University, 2019)
