= Alexandra Kluge =

German actress (1937–2017)

- Born: 2 April 1937; Halberstadt, Province of Saxony, Germany
- Died: 11 June 2017 (aged 80); Berlin, Germany
- Occupation: Actress
- Years active: 1966–1983
- Relatives: Alexander Kluge (brother)

Alexandra Kluge (2 April 1937 – 11 June 2017) was a German actress and medical doctor.

Alexandra Kluge was born in Halberstadt, Saxony-Anhalt, Germany. Her brother was film director and author Alexander Kluge (1932–2026).

== Filmography ==
- Yesterday Girl (1966), as Anita
- Feuerlöscher E. A. Winterstein (1968)
- Part-Time Work of a Domestic Slave (1973), as Roswitha
- The Power of Emotion (1983)
