= European Children's Film Association =

European Children’s Film Association
- Formation: 1988
- Founded at: Belgium
- Type: NGO
- Headquarters: Brussels
- Location: Belgium
- Region served: Europe
- President: Margret Albers
- Website: www.ecfaweb.org

European Children’s Film Association (ECFA) is an organization on films for children and young people. Founded in 1988, it has more than 60 members mostly companies and organizations, from 23 different countries. ECFA is located in Belgium and its current president is Margret Albers.

== ECFA Awards ==
ECFA presents their annual ECFA Awards for Best European Children’s Film, Best European Doc Award and Best European Short Award.

=== 2020 ===
The ceremony was held at the European Children’s Film Community Party during the annual Berlinale film festival, on 22 February. 2019 Belgian film Binti won ECFA Award and 2018 Russian film How big is the galaxy, won ECFA Doc Award.

== See also ==
- Film festivals in Europe
