= Yesterday Girl =

1966 film

- Directed by: Alexander Kluge
- Written by: Alexander Kluge
- Based on: "Anita G." by Alexander Kluge
- Starring: Alexandra Kluge
- Release date: 5 September 1966 (Venice Film Festival)
- Running time: 88 minutes
- Country: West Germany
- Language: German

Yesterday Girl (German: Abschied von gestern, "Farewell to Yesterday") is a 1966 drama film directed and written by Alexander Kluge. The film is based on the short story "Anita G." (1962), which is also by Alexander Kluge. The film tells the story of Anita G., a young East German migrant to West Germany and her struggle to adjust to her new life. The film is associated with New German Cinema.

The film won four German Film Awards. The film won a Silver Lion at the Venice Film Festival, whereas Kluge's next film, Artists Under the Big Top: Perplexed even went on to win the Golden Lion, a political scandal due to its progressive leanings which resulted in no Golden Lions being awarded up to 1979.

== The Dialogue of Yesterday Girl ==
Alexander Kluge's film Yesterday Girl marks a shift in German cinema. Determined to create a new cinematic language, Kluge helped pioneer the new wave of German Cinema by rejecting certain film conventions. Utilizing a jarring editing style, discontinuous sound and a non-sequential narrative, Yesterday Girl effectively destabilizes its audience and conveys a sense of chaos within Germany in the 1960's. Due to its lack of structure, the film almost seems spontaneous in its execution. Ironically, however, the dialogue spoken by the characters in the film does not share this spontaneity. In fact, the characters in Yesterday Girl often deliver very rigid and hackneyed dialogue. For example, in one scene, Anita seeks advice from her professor about the consequences of theft. The professor, however, circles around Anita's actual question and, instead, offers unrelated and nonsensical comments about reading more books, and the difference between love and fear. Effectively, many of the characters within Yesterday Girl have trained responses, failing to address any real or substantive issues. Even Anita is subjected to this form of training when her probation officer attempts to coach her into delivering canned responses to complex questions, such as "what is good?"

The dialogue in Yesterday Girl is intentionally rigid in order to convey Germany's refusal to reconcile with its past. Since the end of the war, the common ideology among Germans was to move forward and ignore their past misdoings. Kluge is ridiculing this behaviour by presenting dialogue that lacks authenticity, with characters willfully ignoring and avoiding any complex topics. Additionally, Kluge is also commenting on the state of cinema. Before the new wave, German cinema had been largely regulated and censored by authoritative powers, such as the Nazi Party and GDR. Consequently, films produced during this era largely focused on escapism, rejecting any political or social commentary. Much like the dialogue in Yesterday Girl, these films served as mouthpieces propagating conformity and conventionality. As such, Kluge is attempting to free cinema from its "intellectual isolation", presenting a film with real artistic and political importance by commenting on the meaninglessness of Germany's past cinematic efforts.

== Cast ==
- Alexandra Kluge as Anita G.
- Hans Korte as The Judge
- Werner Kreindl as Record company's owner
- Edith Kuntze-Pellogio as Parole Board Officer
- Palma Falck as Mrs. Budeck
- Günter Mack as Ministerialrat Pichota
- Eva Maria Meineke as Mrs. Pichota
- Alfred Edel as Assistant at the university
