= Rasmus Borowski =

German composer, singer, and actor

- Born: 21 May 1974 (age 51); Hamburg, West Germany
- Genres: Film score
- Occupations: Composer, singer, actor
- Instrument: Guitar
- Years active: 1998–present
- Website: www.borowskimusic.com

Rasmus Borowski (born 21 May 1974) is a German composer, singer, and actor.

== Early life and education ==
Rasmus Borowski was born in Hamburg in 1974. His parents, recording engineer Richard Borowski and singer Gabi Borowski, often took him to the cinema, where Rasmus discovered his passion for films and music. At the age of four, Rasmus performed his first voice recording in a studio. When he was seven, he started taking guitar lessons. Around this time, he also started making his first short films with his father's Super 8mm film camera. In 1985 he and his mother moved to Brunswick and then, in 1988, to Zimbabwe, where Rasmus went to a boarding school. In 1990, he returned to Brunswick to finish school in Germany.

After his Abitur, Borowski took guitar lessons with Andreas Becker (Fee, Peter Maffay), singing lessons with Jane Comerford (Texas Lightning), lessons in orchestral composing and arrangement with Matthias Petereit, as well as acting and voice over lessons with Prof. Marianne Bernhardt at the Hochschule für Musik und Theater Hamburg.

In 1998/2002, Borowski successfully completed the Kontaktstudiengang Popularmusik (Popkurs) at the Hochschule für Musik und Theater Hamburg. He attended master classes for composing with Academy Award winner Jan A.P. Kaczmarek and Japanese Academy Award winner Shigeru Umebayashi. In 2006, Borowski successfully completed the Filmmasters Program at Universal Studios in Los Angeles.

Borowski lives and works in Hamburg and Berlin.

== Band work, acting and directing ==
=== Bands ===
From 1996 to 1998, Borowski was the songwriter and guitarist of the alternative rock band "Out". From 1998 to 2006, he was the singer and songwriter of the rock band Lust as well as the pop project Borowski & Drusell.

=== Dubbing actor, audio drama actor and film actor ===
Borowski has been working as a dubbing actor in Germany since 2000, dubbing stars such as Luke Evans, Martin Compston, Tom Burke or Jim Watson.

For the German version of the BBC-Series Line of Duty, he dubbed Martin Compston in his role as Steve Arnott.

Borowski's voice can also be heard in audio dramas such as Die drei ???, TKKG and the German version of The Famous Five ("Fünf Freunde").

Since 2011, Borowski has been the voice of the Sith Warrior in the German version of the online roleplay game Star Wars: The Old Republic. Rasmus has played numerous roles as an actor in short films and on stage.

=== Films ===
In 2004, Borowski produced, wrote and directed the acclaimed short film Der Beste (The Old Pro) together with illustrator and director Arne Jysch.

Der Beste received numerous awards, including the Shocking Shorts Award of the TV channel 13th Street in 2006, whereupon Borowski was invited to Universal Studios in Los Angeles to attend the Filmmasters Program.

== Film and television scoring ==
Inspired by the film score composers of his childhood days, Borowski composed his first score for the short film Der Beste, recording with a string ensemble and several solo instruments. Several scores followed, including the soundtracks for the short films Meat the Campbells, The Dead Meat and Todd und der Tod.

=== Teacup Travels ===
In 2014 Borowski composed the film score for the CBeebies series Teacup Travels together with Alexius Tschallener. They composed over 350 minutes of music for a total of 25 episodes of the drama series, which is produced by Plum Films in Edinburgh. The classical orchestra music to be heard in Teacup Travels was recorded in October 2014 with the City of Prague Philharmonic Orchestra, conducted by Nic Raine at Smecky Music Studios in Prague.

Teacup Travels is Borowski's second collaboration with producer Micky MacPherson and director Simon Hynd, for whom he wrote the score to the short film Meat the Campbells in 2005.

=== Other orchestral work ===
In 2008 and 2009, Borowski recorded his own compositions for orchestra with the Polish Radio Symphony Orchestra in Warsaw.

== Awards and nominations ==
- 2006: Shocking Shorts Award from NBCUniversal / 13th Street for Der Beste
- 2006: Murnau short film award from the Friedrich-Wilhelm-Murnau foundation for Der Beste
- 2006: Best European Short Film at the FIKE Film Festival, Évora for Der Beste
- 2006: Audience Award at the Lund International Fantastic Film Festival for Der Beste
- 2006: Golden Méliès Nomination at the Lund International Fantastic Film Festival for Der Beste
- 2005: Best Independent Shortfilm at the Festival of Fantastic Films, Manchester for Der Beste
- 2005: Winner Audience Award at the BIFFF Film Festival, Brussels for Der Beste
- 2005: Prädikat: Besonders Wertvoll from the Deutsche Film- und Medienbewertung (FBW) for Der Beste

== Filmography (selection) ==
=== Composer ===
- 2016: Teacup Travels – Season 2 (TV series)
- 2016: 1000 Mexikaner (TV movie)
- 2014: Teacup Travels (TV series)
- 2007: The Dead Meat
- 2005: Meat the Campbells (short film)
- 2005: Todd und der Tod
- 2004: Der Beste (short film)

=== Director ===
- 2007: Google Earth – Fallen Heroes (commercial)
- 2004: Der Beste (The Old Pro) (short film)

=== Actor ===
- 2016: SMS für Dich (as "Martin")
- 2012: Steffi Likes That (as "Agent Friendscout")
- 2007: The Dead Meat (as "Newsman")
- 2005: Todd und der Tod (as "Tod")
- 2005: Der Upgrader (as "Upgrader")

== Voice actor ==
=== Dubbing actor for games (German) ===
- 2015: Star Wars: The Old Republic – Knights of the Fallen Empire (as "Sith Warrior")
- 2014: Star Wars: The Old Republic – Shadow of Revan (as "Sith Warrior")
- 2014: Star Wars: The Old Republic – Rise of Hutt Cartel (as "Sith Warrior")
- 2010: Tale of a Hero (as "Olaf")
- 2009: The Godfather – Part II (as "Michael Corleone")
- 2008: Dragon Age (as "Niall")
- 2008: Need for Speed: Undercover (as "Chau Wu")
- 2005: Harry Potter – Quidditch-Worldcup (as "Viktor Krum")
- 2005: The Lord of the Rings: The Battle of Middle-Earth 2 (as "Easterling")
- 2004: The Lord of the Rings: The Third Age (as "Elf Warrior")
- 2003: Need for Speed: Underground (as "Todd")
- 2003: Indiana Jones and the Emperor's Tomb

=== Dubbing actor (German) ===
- 2015: Bob's Burgers (as "Dr. Yap")
- 2015: Between (as "Pat" for Jim Watson)
- 2014: Line of Duty (as "Steve Arnott" for Martin Compston)
- 2013: One Small Hitch (as "Josh Shiffman" for Shane McRae)
- 2013: Ida (as "Lis" for Dawid Ogrodnik)
- 2013: The Great Train Robbery (as "Bruce Reynolds" for Luke Evans)
- 2012: An Enemy to Die For (as "Terrence" for Tom Burke)
- 2012: Real Humans (as "Rick" for Johannes Kuhnke)
- 2012: Catfish: The TV Show (as "Nev" for Nev Schulman)
- 2009: Soul Eater (as "Soul Eater")
- 2009: Fanboy & Chum Chum (as "Kyle")
- 2007: Naruto (as "Sakon & Ukon")
- 2005: Transformers – TV series (as "Scattershot")
