= Lutz Mackensy =

German actor and voice actor

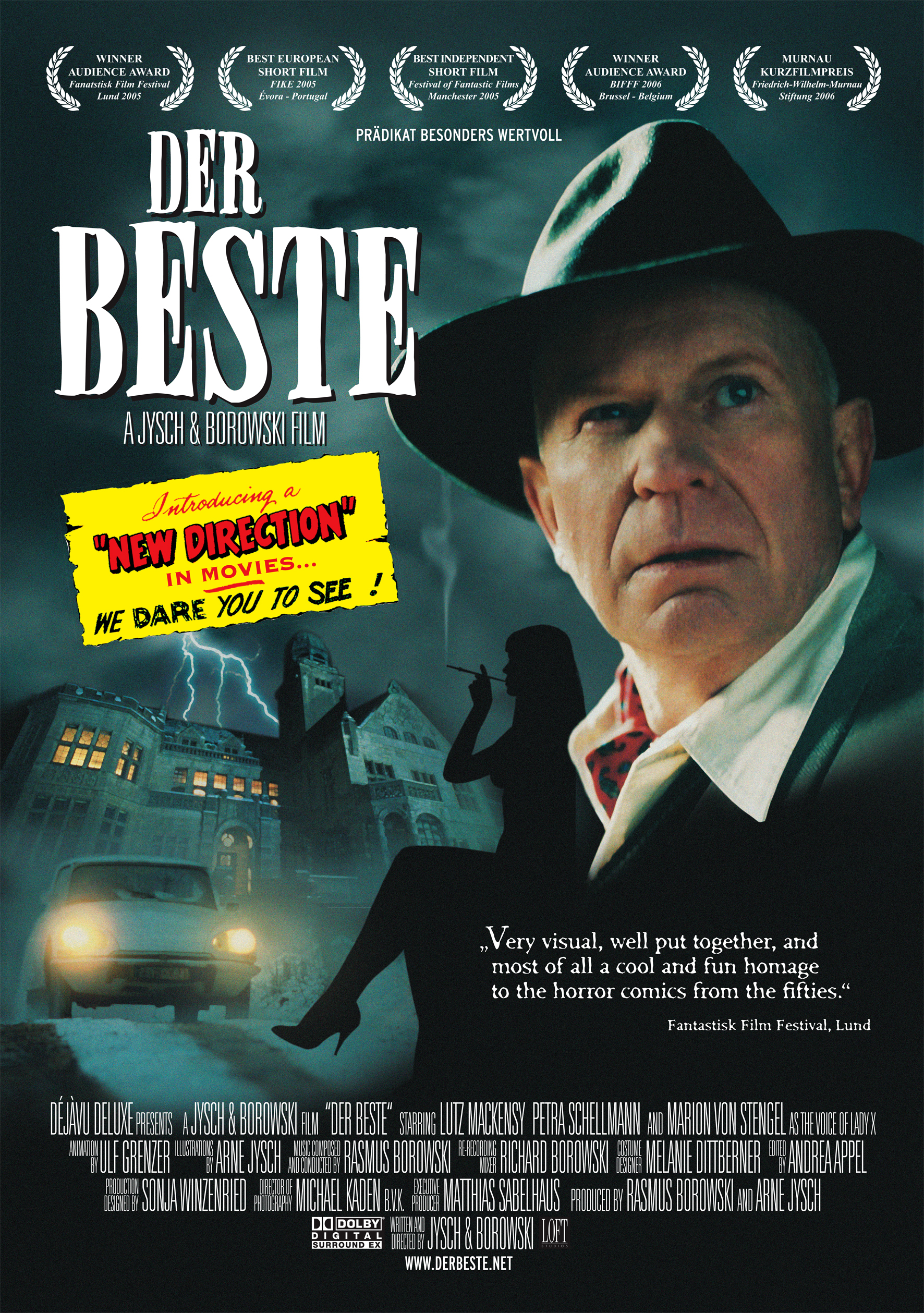
Lutz Mackensy as Der Beste, move poster (2004)

Lutz Werner Mackensy (born 11 March 1944) is a German actor, radio play and dubbing actor.

He became known to a wide audience as Chief Inspector Bernd Zimmermann in the crime series Stubbe – Von Fall zu Fall and as the dubbing voice of well-known actors such as Al Pacino, Rowan Atkinson and Christopher Lloyd.

== Life and career ==
After leaving school, Mackensy attended the Max Reinhardt School of Drama in West Berlin. There he made his stage debut at the Schiller Theatre under Boleslaw Barlog in Walentin Petrowitsch Katayev's Quadratur des Kreises. This was followed by various engagements in Berlin, Hamburg and Wilhelmshaven.

Mackensy made his feature film debut as early as 1958 in Alfred Vohrer's Meine 99 Bräute. It would be almost ten years before he shifted his artistic focus more and more to film and television productions. Initially cast mainly in comic roles, Mackensy was able to showcase a much wider range of his skills in literary films such as Fyodor Dostoyevsky's Demons and Martin Stade's The King and His Fool, stage adaptations such as Schiller's Kabale und Liebe and productions such as Egon Monk's border drama Preis der Freiheit and Reinhard Hauff's Die Verrohung des Franz Blum.

Nevertheless, Mackensy remained true to comic and parodic characters, such as in Otto – Der Film. Mackensy is also a frequently seen guest in television series. He has appeared in Tatort, Polizeiruf 110, Unser Charly, Diese Drombuschs and Rosa Roth. In the science fiction series Der Androjäger, he played the lead role of the endearingly scatterbrained alien who searches for androids on Earth to send them back to their home planet. He also played the lead role in the series Kasse bitte! as a stressed-out supermarket manager.

Lutz Mackensy is also active as a narrator and has been involved in numerous radio plays for young people, working for Europa as the main character in Flash Gordon and appearing in the TKKG, Masters of the Universe and Die drei ??? radio play series. He is the permanent narrator in the radio plays Fünf Freunde and Burg Schreckenstein, as well as in some Hanni and Nanni radio plays. He was also the narrator in Elea Eluanda and Die Hexe Schrumpeldei, as well as in the Simpsons cassettes released in the 1990s.

Mackensy also works extensively in dubbing. His first major dubbing role was Romeo in Franco Zeffirelli's Romeo & Juliet in 1968 and since then he has lent his memorable voice to numerous internationally renowned actors, often for comedic (for example Rowan Atkinson in Bean and Blackadder as well as in Johnny English) or villainous roles (for example Gary Oldman in Hannibal). He has also dubbed Pierce Brosnan (Around the World in 80 Days), Christopher Lloyd (for example in Back to the Future Parts 2 and 3), Malcolm McDowell (Caligula), Al Pacino (among others The Godfather), Jonathan Pryce (Tomorrow Never Dies, Ronin), Stanley Tucci (Lucky Number Slevin, The Hunger Games), Alan Rickman (Die Hard) and Geoffrey Rush (for example Shakespeare in Love). He also lent his voice to Philip Michael Thomas in the crime series Miami Vice and David Caruso.

== Filmography (selection) ==
- 1958: Meine 99 Bräute
- 1965: Die weißen Vorhänge (Les rideaux blancs)
- 1966: Preis der Freiheit
- 1967: Landarzt Dr. Brock (TV series, one episode)
- 1972: Agent aus der Retorte
- 1974: Die Verrohung des Franz Blum
- 1975: Das Messer im Rücken
- 1976–1979: PS (TV series, seven episodes)
- 1976–2004: Tatort (TV series)
  - 1976: Transit ins Jenseits
  - 1988: Die Brüder
  - 1990: Tod einer Ärztin
  - 1995: Mordnacht
  - 1997: Mord hinterm Deich
  - 1998: Engelchen flieg
  - 2004: Bienzle und der steinerne Gast
- 1977: Die Dämonen
- 1978: Heinrich Heine
- 1979: Kabale und Liebe
- 1979: St. Pauli-Landungsbrücken (TV series, one episode)
- 1981: Der König und sein Narr
- 1982–1984: Der Androjäger (TV series, 26 episodes)
- 1985: Otto – Der Film
- 1986: Liebling Kreuzberg (TV series, one episode)
- 1986: Was zu beweisen war
- 1986–2005: Großstadtrevier (TV series, 27 episodes)
- 1987–1993: Der Landarzt (TV series, 22 episodes)
- 1988: Kasse bitte! (TV series)
- 1989: Die Männer vom K3 (TV series, one episode)
- 1990: Ein Heim für Tiere (TV series, one episode)
- 1992: Neues vom Süderhof: Kamera läuft (TV series episode)
- 1992: Diese Drombuschs (TV series, 2 episodes)
- 1994–1997: Polizeiruf 110 (TV series)
  - 1994: Opfergang
  - 1997: Feuertod
- 1994: Ihre Exzellenz, die Botschafterin (TV series, one episode)
- 1995: Evelyn Hamanns Geschichten aus dem Leben – Rendezvous mit Rudolf
- 1995–2014: Stubbe – Von Fall zu Fall (TV series, 50 episodes)
- 1996: Angst hat eine kalte Hand
- 1999: Die Spesenritter
- 2001: Sass
- 2002: Die Rettungsflieger (TV series, episode Auf Knall und Fall)
- 2004–2013: Rosamunde Pilcher (TV series)
  - 2004: Liebe im Spiel
  - 2012: Das Geheimnis der weißen Taube
  - 2013: Die Frau auf der Klippe
- 2004: Der Beste (short film)
- 2011: Seerosensommer
