= My Ninety Nine Brides =

- Directed by: Alfred Vohrer
- Written by: Sigi Sommer (novel); Franz Geiger
- Produced by: Wenzel Lüdecke
- Starring: Claus Wilcke; Horst Frank; Wera Frydtberg
- Cinematography: Kurt Hasse
- Edited by: Ira Oberberg
- Music by: Martin Böttcher
- Production company: Inter West Film
- Distributed by: Europa-Filmverleih
- Release date: 4 December 1958
- Running time: 86 minutes
- Country: West Germany
- Language: German

My Ninety Nine Brides (German: Meine 99 Bräute) is a 1958 West German romantic comedy film directed by Alfred Vohrer and starring Claus Wilcke, Horst Frank and Wera Frydtberg. It was shot at the Tempelhof Studios in Berlin. The film's sets were designed by the art director Karl Weber.

== Synopsis ==
In Munich a womaniser who has had dalliances with ninety nine different girls eventually meets the hundredth and falls genuinely in love with her.

== Cast ==
- Claus Wilcke as Nicki Montag
- Horst Frank as Jonny der Husar
- Wera Frydtberg as Greta Föhn
- Vera Tschechowa as Else Heer
- Corny Collins as Irmelin
- Erica Beer as Regina Hale
- Edith Hancke as Ruth
- Erna Sellmer as Frau Bittgesang
- Ingrid van Bergen as Sophie
- Bum Krüger as Herr Reif
- Inge Wolffberg as Ingrid
- Erich Fiedler as Butler
- Tilo von Berlepsch as Konsul Hale
- Wolfgang Gruner as Ansager
- Clemens Hasse as Vater Heer
- Peter Nijinskij as Pianist
- Lutz Mackensy as Eugen
- Liesl Karlstadt as Mutter Montag
- Beppo Brem as Vater Montag
- Hilde Volk as Imogen
- Edith Elmay as Lina
- Hans-Wolf Schneider as Guido
- Hans-Peter Strohkorb as Manometer-Paul

== Bibliography ==
- Bock, Hans-Michael & Bergfelder, Tim. The Concise CineGraph. Encyclopedia of German Cinema. Berghahn Books, 2009.
