= Der Beste =

2004 film

Der Beste (The Old Pro)
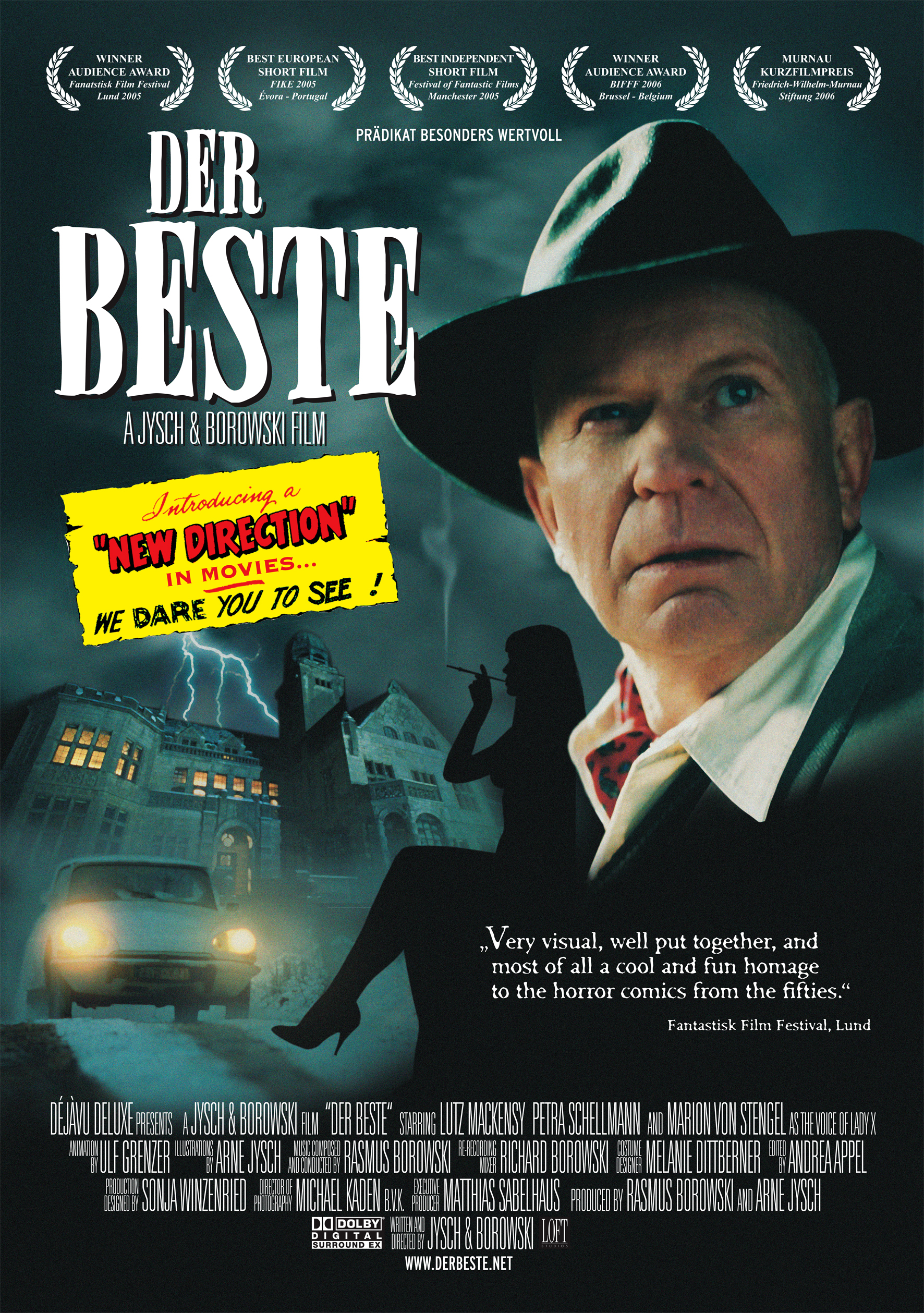
- Movie poster
- Directed by: Arne Jysch & Rasmus Borowski
- Written by: Arne Jysch; Rasmus Borowski
- Produced by: Rasmus Borowski; Arne Jysch
- Starring: Lutz Mackensy; Petra Schellmann; Marion von Stengel; Bonnie Sapiano
- Cinematography: Michael Kaden, BVK
- Edited by: Andrea Appel
- Music by: Rasmus Borowski
- Release date: 1 December 2004 (Premiere at Grindel Palast in Hamburg)
- Running time: 15 minutes
- Country: Germany
- Language: English / German

Der Beste (The Old Pro) is a mystery short film written and directed by Arne Jysch and Rasmus Borowski.

== Premise ==
Harry, an aging pro named the "best" is offered the job of his lifetime: a mysterious lady lures him into her dark, castle-like abode for a last and highly paid assignment that is to surpass even Harry's fantasy.

== DVD release ==
Der Beste (The Old Pro) was released in 2006 by 13th Street and Concorde Home Entertainment on the DVD Shocking Shorts 3.

== Awards ==
- 2006: Shocking Shorts Award – NBCUniversal / 13th Street
- 2006: Murnau-Kurzfilmpreis – Friedrich-Wilhelm-Murnau-Stiftung
- 2006: Best European Short Film – FIKE Film Festival, Évora
- 2006: Audience Award of Lund International Fantastic Film Festival
- 2006: Golden Méliès Nomination – Lund International Fantastic Film Festival
- 2005: Best Independent Shortfilm – Festival of Fantastic Films, Manchester
- 2005: Winner Audience Award – BIFFF Film Festival, Brüssel
- 2005: Prädikat: Besonders Wertvoll – Deutsche Film- und Medienbewertung (FBW)
