= Teacup Travels =

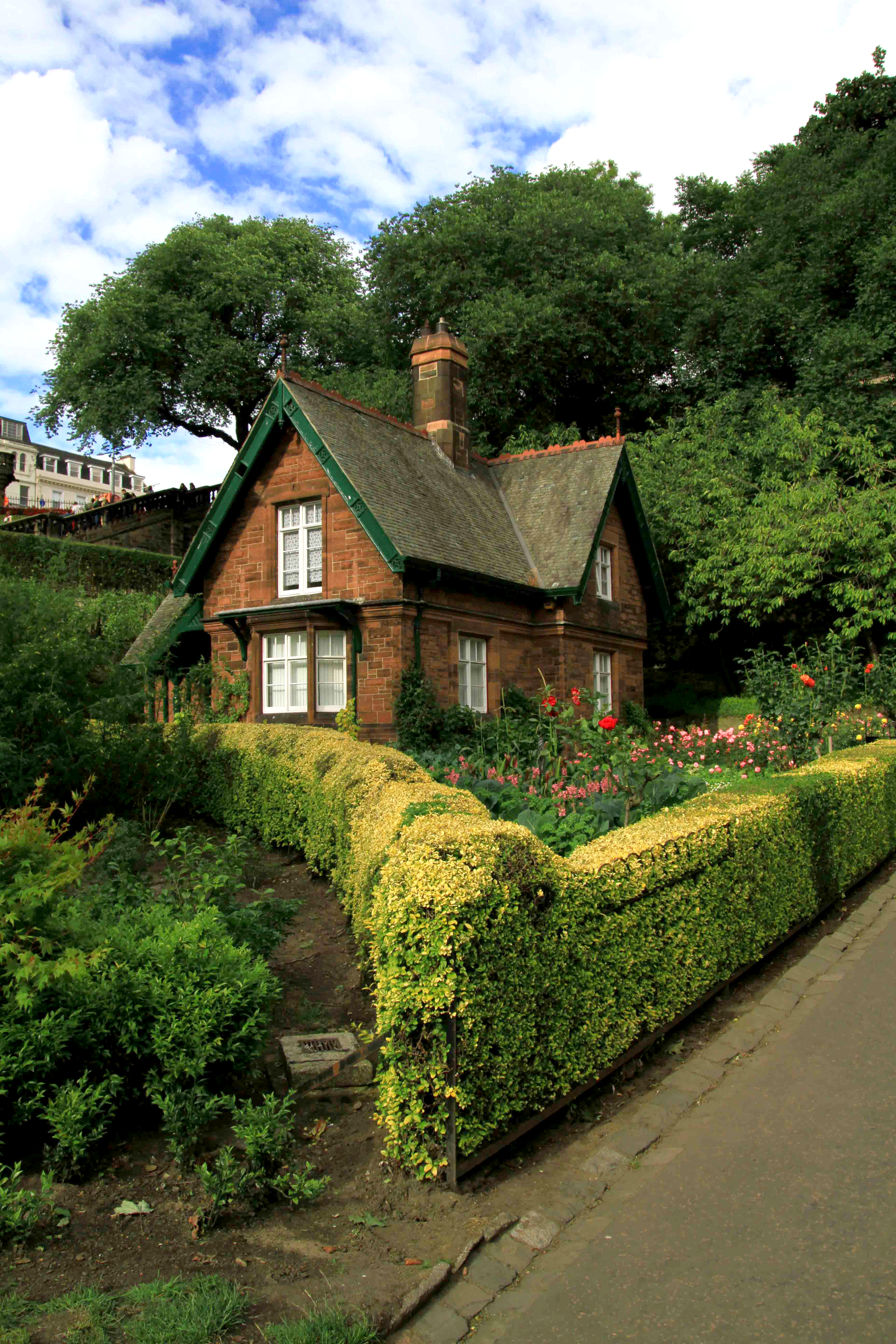
- Great Aunt Lizzie's cottage
- Genre: Drama
- Developed by: Micky MacPherson; Simon Parsons
- Written by: Head Writer
- Directed by: Simon Hynd
- Composers: Rasmus Borowski; Alexius Tschallener
- Country of origin: United Kingdom
- No. of series: 2
- No. of episodes: 45

Production
- Executive producers: Michael Towner (CBeebies); Julia Bond (CBeebies); Tina Foster (Plum Films); Jennifer Armitage (Creative Scotland)
- Producers: Micky MacPherson; Simon Parsons
- Cinematography: Malcolm McLean
- Running time: 15 minutes
- Production company: Plum Films

Teacup Travels is a British children's drama TV series. The show was created and produced by Plum Films with support from Creative Scotland and first shown on CBeebies on 9 February 2015.

The concept of the series is historical fiction for young children, incorporating historical artefacts into dramatic adventure stories. At the time of filming, all the artefacts featured in the show were held in museum collections around the UK.

== Concept ==
Great Aunt Lizzie tells tales of adventure to entertain her young visitors, Charlotte, Lokesh and Elliot. When either one arrives at the house she offers them a cup of tea, but first they have to choose a teacup from her vast collection which she keeps in an enormous dresser in the kitchen. Each cup is unique and illustrated with one of the museum artefacts. As she begins to tell its story, they begin to imagine being there as the tale unfolds.

Kay Benbow, then the Controller of CBeebies, said, "This is a first for CBeebies to bring ancient history and archaeology to our young audience. The series combines story telling with high adventure in a way that will inspire and encourage children to want to learn more about life in ancient times. I think children will love going on the adventures with Charlotte [and Elliot or Lokesh] to discover more about what life was like thousands of years ago."

== Key cast ==
- Gemma Jones as Great Aunt Lizzie
- Evie Brassington as Charlotte
- Roderick Gilkison as Elliot (series 1)
- Kemaal Deen-Ellis as Lokesh (Series 2)

== Series one ==
Series one sees Charlotte and her brother Elliot having adventures in Ancient Rome, Imperial China, Ancient Egypt and the pre-medieval Celtic lands, spanning a period from 2500 BCE to 1850 CE.

These 15-minute episodes are regularly repeated on CBeebies and featured on BBC i-Player. Series 1 was filmed between August and November 2014.

List of episodes in series one
- Episode 1: Spectacles – (Original Air Date: 9 February 2015)
  - Summary: Great Aunt Lizzie tells the story of Charlotte and the Adventure of the Expensive Spectacles: An artist in Imperial China with poor eyesight can't afford the spectacles he needs. Charlotte goes on an epic quest to find a pair for him.
  - Associated Museum: British Optical Association Museum
- Episode 2: Thimble – (Original Air Date: 10 February 2015)
  - Summary: Great Aunt Lizzie tells the story of Elliot and the Adventure of the Brass Thimble: A seamstress needs her special thimble to sew a Celtic warrior queen into her armour.
  - Associated Museum: Inverness Museum and Art Gallery
- Episode 3: Mortarium – (Original Air Date: 11 February 2015)
  - Summary: Great Aunt Lizzie tells the story of Charlotte and the Adventure of the Magnificent Mortarium: A monk in Ancient Rome is running out of time to prep a special meal for the priests.
  - Associated Museum: Dumfries Museum
- Episode 4: Mirror – (Original Air Date: 12 February 2015)
  - Summary: Great Aunt Lizzie tells the story of Elliot and the Adventure of the Glassless Mirror: An Ancient Egyptian sees his reflection and thinks his chance of marriage is over.
  - Associated Museum: National Museum of Scotland
- Episode 5: Tiger Tally – (Original Air Date: 13 February 2015)
  - Summary: Great Aunt Lizzie tells the story of Charlotte and the Adventure of the Tiger Tally Mix-Up: A guard in Imperial China mistakes Charlotte for the doctor who must heal the Empress.
  - Associated Museum: Durham University Oriental Museum
- Episode 6: Scales – (Original Air Date: 16 February 2015)
  - Summary: Great Aunt Lizzie tells the story of Elliot and the Adventure of the Roman Scales: An apple juice vendor in Ancient Rome has trouble recreating the secret family recipe.
  - Associated Museum: British Museum
- Episode 7: Headrest – (Original Air Date: 17 February 2015)
  - Summary: Great Aunt Lizzie tells the story of Charlotte and the Adventure of the Ancient Headrest: A wealthy Ancient Egyptian is shocked to discover that sleeping will ruin his new hairdo.
  - Associated Museum: Swansea Museum
- Episode 8: Lucky Horse – (Original Air Date: 18 February 2015)
  - Summary: Great Aunt Lizzie tells the story of Elliot and The Adventure of The Lucky Horse: A medical student in Imperial China thinks his skills depend on a good luck charm.
  - Associated Museum: Durham University Oriental Museum
- Episode 9: Amphora – (Original Air Date: 19 February 2015)
  - Summary: Great Aunt Lizzie tells the story of Charlotte and the Adventure of the Roman Amphora: A muddled merchant in Ancient Rome mixes up an important order on her first day at work.
  - Associated Museum: Royal Albert Memorial Museum
- Episode 10: Brooch – (Original Air Date: 20 February 2015)
  - Summary: Great Aunt Lizzie tells the story of Elliot and the Adventure of the Bronze Brooch: A young Celtic blacksmith loses a valuable piece of jewellery he had made for his mum.
  - Associated Museum: The Dick Institute
- Episode 11: Brick Mould – (Original Air Date: 23 February 2015)
  - Summary: Great Aunt Lizzie tells the story of Charlotte and the Adventure of the Wooden Mould: A brick maker in Ancient Egypt needs a new mould before the Pharaoh's architect arrives.
  - Associated Museum: Manchester Museum
- Episode 12: Abacus – (Original Air Date: 24 February 2015)
  - Summary: Great Aunt Lizzie tells the story of Elliot and the Adventure of the Amazing Abacus: An old woman in Imperial China needs a better way to keep count of the villagers' savings. Elliot goes on an epic quest to find an abacus.
  - Associated Museum: Durham University Oriental Museum
- Episode 13: Key Ring – (Original Air Date: 25 February 2015)
  - Summary: Great Aunt Lizzie tells the story of Charlotte and the Adventure of the Lost Key Ring: A baker in Ancient Rome accidentally bakes his key-ring into a batch of bread loaves.
  - Associated Museum: Birmingham Museum and Art Gallery
- Episode 14: Sandals – (Original Air Date: 25 February 2015)
  - Summary: Great Aunt Lizzie tells the story of Elliot and the Adventure of the Ragged Sandals: A cobbler in Ancient Egypt is unable to mend sandals after a mix-up with a paper-maker.
  - Associated Museum: Birmingham Museum and Art Gallery
- Episode 15: Merchant's Ring – (Original Air Date: 27 February 2015)
  - Summary: Great Aunt Lizzie tells the story of Charlotte and the Adventure of the Merchant's Ring: A pair of bumbling merchants run into some trouble when they cannot prove their identity.
  - Associated Museum: Dumfries Museum
- Episode 16: Snake Bracelet – (Original Air Date: 2 March 2015)
  - Summary: Great Aunt Lizzie tells the story of Elliot and the Adventure of the Roman Snake Bracelet: A woman in Ancient Rome needs Elliot's help to be reunited with her long-lost mother.
  - Associated Museum: Peterborough Museum and Art Gallery
- Episode 17: Wooden Horse – (Original Air Date: 3 March 2015)
  - Summary: Great Aunt Lizzie tells the story of Charlotte and the Adventure of the Wooden Horse: A carpenter in Ancient Egypt doesn't believe children will like the toys she makes.
  - Associated Museum: Manchester Museum
- Episode 18: Seal Matrix – (Original Air Date: 4 March 2015)
  - Summary: Great Aunt Lizzie tells the story of Elliot and the Adventure of the Seal Matrix: A Celtic swineherd will lose his farm if he can't sign a legal document by the end of the day.
  - Associated Museum: Inverness Museum and Art Gallery
- Episode 19: Jade Flute – (Original Air Date: 5 March 2015)
  - Summary: Great Aunt Lizzie tells the story of Charlotte and the Adventure of the Jade Flute: A prince in Imperial China gives up playing the flute after his best friend is sent far away.
  - Associated Museum: Durham University Oriental Museum
- Episode 20: Inkwell – (Original Air Date: 6 March 2015)
  - Summary: Great Aunt Lizzie tells the story of Elliot and the Adventure of the Inkwell and the Soldier: A soldier in Ancient Rome needs a way to keep in touch with his mum while he is away.
  - Associated Museum: Birmingham Museum and Art Gallery
- Episode 21: Key – (Original Air Date: 9 March 2015)
  - Summary: Great Aunt Lizzie tells the story of Charlotte and the Adventure of the Small Bronze Key: A penniless brother and sister must work together to unearth a hidden box of treasures.
  - Associated Museum: Stranraer Museum
- Episode 22: Moon Fan – (Original Air Date: 10 March 2015)
  - Summary: Great Aunt Lizzie tells the story of Elliot and the Adventure of the Chinese Moon Fan: An Imperial Chinese trader has trouble selling her moon fans until she makes a new friend.
  - Associated Museum: Durham University Oriental Museum
- Episode 23: Lamp – (Original Air Date: 11 March 2015)
  - Summary: Great Aunt Lizzie tells the story of Charlotte and the Adventure of the Roman Lamp: A servant in Ancient Rome must replace her broken oil lamp before it gets dark.
  - Associated Museum: Birmingham Museum and Art Gallery
- Episode 24: Scarab Necklace – (Original Air Date: 12 March 2015)
  - Summary: Great Aunt Lizzie tells the story of Elliot and the Adventure of the Flying Scarab Necklace: A young woman in Ancient Egypt breaks a precious necklace her mother gave her.
  - Associated Museum: Ulster Museum
- Episode 25: Armlet – (Original Air Date: 13 March 2015)
  - Summary: Great Aunt Lizzie tells the story of Charlotte and the Adventure of the Warrior's Armlet: A great Celtic warrior is to be presented a rare treasure but fetching it is a challenge.
  - Associated Museum: Inverness Museum and Art Gallery

== Series two ==
Charlotte returns for the second series, and introduces the viewers to her cousin Lokesh. Their adventures take them to the fascinating words of Edo Japan, Ancient Greece, the Mayan Empire, and the Viking Lands. Series two was initially split with 10 new episodes premiering from 28 November 2016, and the 10 episodes transmitting from 2 January 2017. Since going on air, the series has already enjoyed a number of repeats. Series 2 was filmed between May and August 2016.

List of episodes in series two
- Episode 1: Dragon – (Original Air Date: 28 November 2016)
  - Summary: Great Aunt Lizzie tells the story of Charlotte and the Wise Dragon. An armourer’s apprentice needs more silk to finish his iron dragon."
  - Associated Museum: Manchester Museum
- Episode 2: Comedy Mask – (Original Air Date: 29 November 2016)
  - Summary: Great Aunt Lizzie tells the story of Lokesh and the Greek Comedy Mask. Lokesh delivers a gift to a Greek Actor on behalf of a busy mask maker.
  - Associated Museum: Kelvingrove Art Gallery and Museum
- Episode 3: Cowrie Shells – (Original Air Date: 30 November 2016)
  - Summary: Great Aunt Lizzie tells the story of Charlotte and the Cowrie Shells. A woman awaiting her brother’s return makes an offering to the Goddesses.
  - Associated Museum: Jorvik Viking Centre
- Episode 4: Vase – (Original Air Date: 1 December 2016)
  - Summary: Great Aunt Lizzie tells the story of Lokesh and the Mayan Vase. An Emperor is to ascend the throne and wants to have his favourite hot drink.
  - Associated Museum: The British Museum
- Episode 5: Pig Rattle – (Original Air Date: 2 December 2016)
  - Summary: Great Aunt Lizzie tells the story of Charlotte and the Pig Rattle. Two new Grandparents find themselves in double trouble when they only have one rattle between two babies!
  - Associated Museum: Swansea Museum
- Episode 6: Print Block – (Original Air Date: 5 December 2016)
  - Summary: Great Aunt Lizzie tells the story of Lokesh & the Printer’s Block. Lokesh meets a man who needs to find a gift but only has a piece of cherry wood in his possession.
  - Associated Museum: The Victoria and Albert Museum
- Episode 7: Ear Ornament – (Original Air Date: 6 December 2016)
  - Summary: Great Aunt Lizzie tells the story of Charlotte and the Ear Ornament. Charlotte meets a Mathematician who has forgotten a special birthday!
  - Associated Museum: The British Museum
- Episode 8: Boat Rivets – (Original Air Date: 7 December 2016)
  - Summary: Great Aunt Lizzie tells the story of Lokesh and the Boat Rivets. A boat builder and a Viking swap jobs, but the Viking runs out of rivets!
  - Associated Museum: National Museum of Scotland
- Episode 9: Inro – (Original Air Date: 8 December 2016)
  - Summary: Great Aunt Lizzie tells the story of Charlotte & the Inro. A mix-up at the market causes trouble for a writer & chef when they swap inro.
  - Associated Museum: Oriental Museum
- Episode 10: Discus – (Original Air Date: 9 December 2016)
  - Summary: Great Aunt Lizzie tells the story of Lokesh & the Discus. Exoidas lacks confidence ahead of a competition and needs reminding of his success.
  - Associated Museum: The British Museum
- Episode 11: Whistle – (Original Air Date: 2 January 2017)
  - Summary: Great Aunt Lizzie tells the story of Lokesh and The Mayan Whistle. Lokesh meets a Builder whose Assistant can’t hear him when he calls for her.
  - Associated Museum: The British Museum
- Episode 12: Netsuke – (Original Air Date: 3 January 2017)
  - Summary: Great Aunt Lizzie tells the story of Charlotte and the Groom’s Netsuke. A hapless Groom keeps losing the items he needs for his big day!
  - Associated Museum: Oriental Museum
- Episode 13: Thor's Hammer – (Original Air Date: 4 January 2017)
  - Summary: Great Aunt Lizzie tells the story of Lokesh and the Thor’s Hammer Amulet. A Viking heads off to sea leaving behind his family and his lucky amulet!
  - Associated Museum: Norwich Castle
- Episode 14: Arrowhead – (Original Air Date: 5 January 2017)
  - Summary: Great Aunt Lizzie tells the story of Charlotte and the Mayan Hunter's Arrowhead. A farm worker wishes to become a great hunter, but has too much work to do.
  - Associated Museum: Museum of Archaeology and Anthropology, University of Cambridge
- Episode 15: Astragali – (Original Air Date: 6 January 2017)
  - Summary: Great Aunt Lizzie tells the story of Lokesh and the Adventure of the Astragali. When a brother and sister arrive early for the festival they are in need of some entertainment.
  - Associated Museum: Ure Museum of Greek Archaeology
- Episode 16: Ice-Skates – (Original Air Date: 9 January 2017)
  - Summary: Great Aunt Lizzie tells the story of Charlotte and the Viking Ice-Skates. A Prince is searching for a maiden; his only clue is her ice-skate.
  - Associated Museum: Jorvik Viking Centre
- Episode 17: Spouted Pot – (Original Air Date: 10 January 2017)
  - Summary: Great Aunt Lizzie tells the story of Lokesh and the Spouted Pot. A young woman is eager to impress her new mother-in-law with a tea ceremony.
  - Associated Museum: Fitzwilliam Museum
- Episode 18: Skyphos – (Original Air Date: 11 January 2017)
  - Summary: Great Aunt Lizzie tells the story of Charlotte and the Skyphos. A servant is preparing for the festivities when he notices a crack in the cup he needs.
  - Associated Museum: Birmingham Museum and Art Gallery
- Episode 19: Spindle Whorl – (Original Air Date: 12 January 2017)
  - Summary: Great Aunt Lizzie tells the story of Lokesh and the Spindle Whorl. A mother has to repair her son’s poncho before the big ceremony.
  - Associated Museum: Museum of Archaeology and Anthropology, University of Cambridge
- Episode 20: Tweezers – (Original Air Date: 13 January 2017)
  - Summary: Great Aunt Lizzie tells the story of Charlotte and the Viking Tweezers. A great warrior has a splinter and can’t pick up his mighty sword!
  - Associated Museum: The Whithorn Trust

== Production ==
=== Development ===
Micky MacPherson, Simon Parsons and Tony Bibby have backgrounds in TV commercial production, advertising, and children's TV. Producers MacPherson and Parsons developed the format for the series, drawing inspiration from Bibby's real aunt whom he used to visit in Liverpool as a child. The producers added storytelling around a genuine historical artefact, with Plum Film's Production Executive Tina Foster, and Development Consultant Becky Lloyd both attached to the project from early development to series production. Series one and two are directed by Simon Hynd, with Morag McKinnon directing the Mayan episodes in series two. Digital Production Designer John Gosler, directed and hand painted background artwork, with children's television writer Polly Churchill taking the role of Head Writer for both series, overseeing all 45 episodes.

Production Designer was Leslie Dilley, a double Academy Award Winner for Star Wars and Raiders of the Lost Ark.

=== Museum involvement ===
A key element of the show is its involvement with museums across the length and breadth of the United Kingdom. Plum Films consulted museums at key stages of production to ensure that the real artefacts that inspired Great Aunt Lizzie's stories reflected its core truths. Where possible, Plum Films representatives visited the museum to capture the dimensions and likeness of the object to be featured in the show. This aided the prop makers to replicate the prop, which would then be presented to each associated museum's curator for notes and approval. Similarly, script outlines were shared with each associated museum to give the all clear that the episode represented a satisfactory representation of their piece.

List of associated museums
- Birmingham Museum and Art Gallery
- British Museum
- British Optical Association Museum
- The Dick Institute
- Dumfries Museum
- Durham University Oriental Museum
- Fitzwilliam Museum
- Inverness Museum and Art Gallery
- Jorvik Viking Centre
- Kelvingrove Art Gallery and Museum
- Manchester Museum
- Museum of Archaeology and Anthropology, University of Cambridge
- National Museum of Scotland
- Norwich Castle
- Peterborough Museum and Art Gallery
- Royal Albert Memorial Museum
- Stranraer Museum
- Swansea Museum
- Ulster Museum
- Ure Museum of Greek Archaeology
- The Victoria and Albert Museum
- The Whithorn Trust

=== Filming ===
The TV show is a combination of full live action for the prologue and epilogue scenes in Great Aunt Lizzie's house, and live action filmed against green screen then composited with colour saturated 2^{½}d illustrated backgrounds for the story world.

=== Locations ===
Filmed entirely in Scotland, the sets were created in Loretto School, Musselburgh, while outdoor scenes featuring Great Aunt Lizzie's iconic cottage were filmed at the Head Gardener's Cottage in Princes Street Gardens, Edinburgh.

=== Distribution (Non-UK) ===
The first series of Teacup Travels was shown in Australia on ABC Kids in the summer of 2016. The show has reached Number 1 in the ratings and continues to be repeated on the channel.

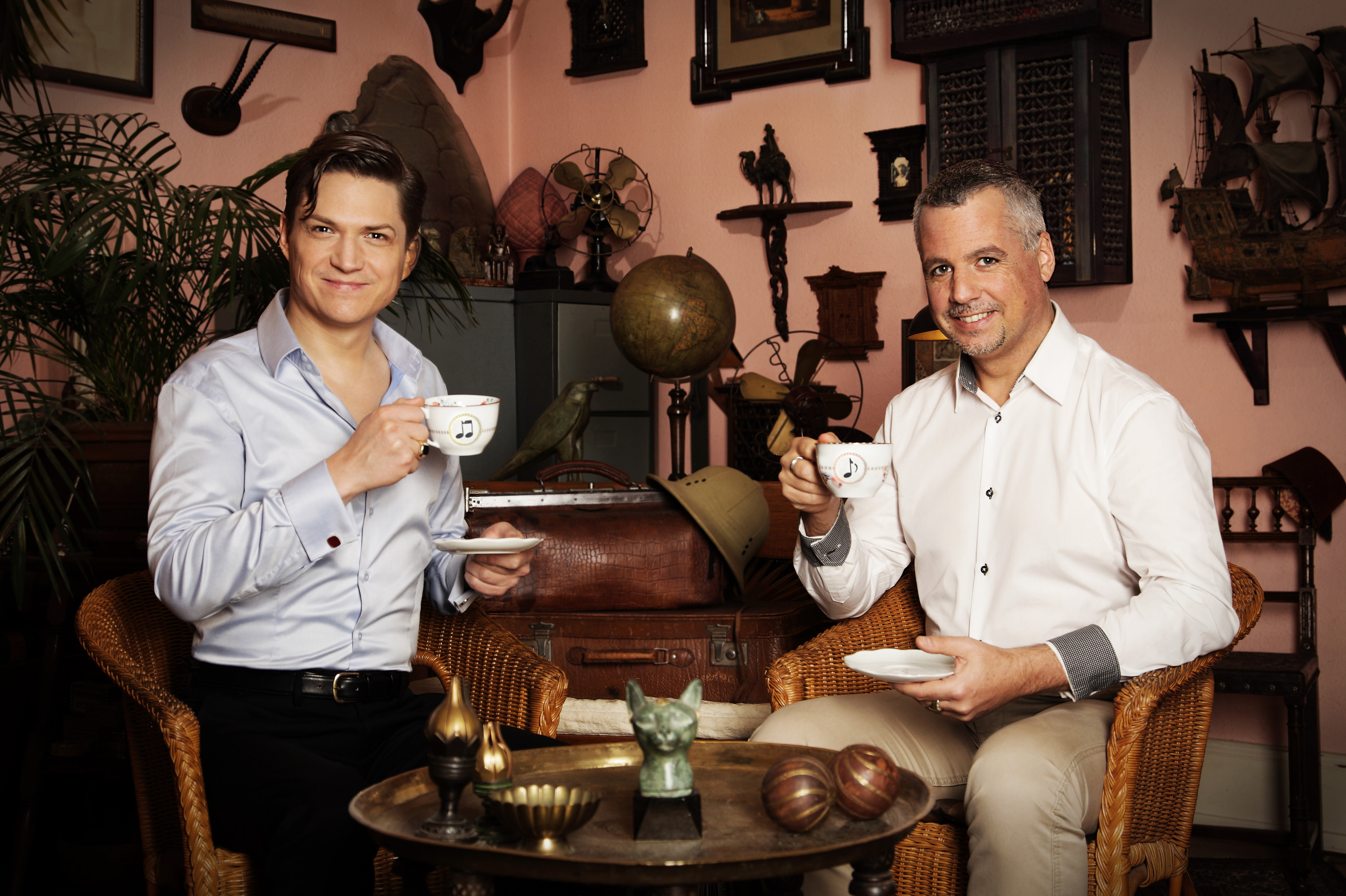
Composers for Teacup Travels: Rasmus Borowski (on the left) and Alexius Tschallener (on the right)

=== Music ===
The soundtrack for series one and two was composed by Rasmus Borowski and Alexius Tschallener. The score was recorded live in Prague, Czech Republic, with the City of Prague Philharmonic Orchestra and Nic Raine conducting.

=== Training ===
A stepping-up programme was created in partnership with Creative Skillset especially for Series Two with the aim of giving two emerging production talents – Catrina Rose and Gabriel Costa – an opportunity to work across the entire production process from early stages through to delivery. Plum Films' Training through Production Scheme was funded by Creative Skillset's Skills Investment Fund with the aim of up-skilling talent to ensure a strong, skilled creative workforce.

=== CBeebies Storytime App ===
On 24 April 2017 the CBeebies Storytime App launched an originally written and built story titled 'Charlotte and the Viking Coins' based on an object that has not been previously seen on the show. The story is narrated by Great Aunt Lizzie, and Charlotte follows an adventure based on real Viking coins that can be found in various museums throughout the UK. The App gives children an interactive storytelling experience, allowing them to engage in reading in a fun and exciting way. The App offers the child to read alone or with a grown-up, as well as providing questions at the end to allow further story discussion and engagement.

== Reception ==
=== Ratings ===
In its debut week of 9 February 2015, the show placed three times in the top 10 viewed shows on CBeebies, peaking at 561,000 viewers.

=== Award Nominations ===
The first series of Teacup Travels has received various nominations, both in the UK and abroad

- BAFTA Scotland (2015 ) – Best Children's Programme
- Broadcast Awards (2016) – Best Pre-School Programme 2015/2016
- Celtic Media Festival (2016) – Children's Programme
- Prix Jeunesse International (2016) – Children's Fiction, 6 years and under
