= Der Androjäger =

- Country of origin: Germany

Der Androjäger was a German sci-fi comedy television series which aired for the first time on 9 August 1982. 26 episodes were produced in total by Bavaria Film Studios.

An alien transport space ship has lost androids on Earth. They survived the crash and try to integrate in human society. The location is obviously Munich although this is not explicitly stated in the series.

Protagonist Dandore (Lutz Mackensy) is made looking human and starts working for the police. In this disguise, he can search for the androids. They appear human, but are given away by their behavior: each android is programmed for a specific task. At the end of each episode, Dandore alias police officer Majer sends an android home to the alien planet.

Majer is assisted by a talking microcomputer and reports to Airavab Reileta (Charlotte Kerr), his superior to whom he communicates via a device hidden in a mirror. Other recurring roles are a colleague and a superior of Majer's at the police, and the caretaker of the apartment building in which Majer lives.

The comedy is based on the awkward or repetitive behavior of the androids, on Majer's good-humoured incompetence and on mockery about bureaucracy and rigid thinking.

== See also ==
- List of German television series
