= Deutsche Film- und Medienbewertung (FBW) =

German federal authority

The Deutsche Film- und Medienbewertung (FBW; formerly the Filmbewertungsstelle Wiesbaden) is a German federal authority for evaluating and rating film and media, located at Biebrich Palace in Wiesbaden.

== History ==
It was founded by resolution on August 20, 1951 by a regular assembly of all German state ministers of education (Kultusministerkonferenz). The FBW, overseen by the Hessian Ministry for Science and the Arts, renders an expert opinion on films. Its two certification marks for outstanding quality are "worthwhile" (Wertvoll) and "especially worthwhile" (Besonders wertvoll).

In case of winning a mark, screenwriters, directors and other film artists receive so-called reference points; these make it easier for filmmakers to receive subsidies for future projects. Likewise, films rated as "worthwhile" or "especially worthwhile" are subject to lower entertainment taxes, depending on the specific state laws. Films are rated separately by genre. For example, the same jury rated two films – Hellboy II: The Golden Army and Das weiße Band – in the same meeting, and awarded them both an especially worthwhile.

The first film to be reviewed and decorated by this institution was Peter Lorre's directorial debut, Der Verlorene. In 1988, the FBW was heavily criticized for awarding a worthwhile rating to Rambo III.

The FBW and the Freiwillige Selbstkontrolle der Filmwirtschaft (Voluntary Self Regulation of the Movie Industry, also known as FSK), also based in Wiesbaden, work independently from each other. The FSK (similar to the British Board of Film Classification) manages a motion picture rating system with regard to the eligibility of films for children, and concentrates on how old viewers must be before they might be allowed to consume the examined media without the company of an adult. While the FSK has a remit to examine all media before they can be sold in Germany, the FBW audits all films that can be legally distributed in Germany. Films are audited on request, for a fee of about 20 Euros per minute. The 85 judges who adjudicate films in teams of five are paid on a nominal basis at 20 Euros per day, plus expenses.

Because the FBW's ratings are valuable in marketing films and DVDs, most commercial productions are audited by the FBW – even though any student filmmaker can have his or her short film rated by the FBW, too.
