= List of works by Lotte Ledl in film and television =

List of film works of Lotte Ledl

This is a list of the works by Lotte Ledl in film and on television. She appeared in films, television films (TV) including series (TV series), and as a voice actress:

- 1954: Der Förster vom Silberwald
- 1955: Die Sennerin von St. Kathrein
- 1956: Dort oben, wo die Alpen glühen
- 1956: Hengst Maestoso Austria
- 1956: Husarenmanöver
- 1956: Kaiserjäger
- 1956: Försterliesel
- 1956: Der Schandfleck
- 1956: Holiday am Wörthersee
- 1957: Ober, zahlen!
- 1957: Dort in der Wachau
- 1957: Jungfrauenkrieg
- 1958: Ein Lied geht um die Welt
- 1959: Besuch aus heiterem Himmel
- 1960: Jenseits des Rheins
- 1960: Das Kamel geht durch das Nadelöhr (TV)
- 1962: Max, der Taschendieb
- 1962: Straße der Verheißung
- 1963: Apartment-Zauber
- 1963: Liliom (TV)
- 1964: Schwejks Flegeljahre
- 1965: Der Alpenkönig und der Menschenfeind
- 1965: Der junge Törless
- 1965: Die Reise nach Steiermark (TV)
- 1965: Der Mörder ist flüchtig (TV series Alarm in den Bergen)
- 1965: Heidi
- 1966: Der Fall Rouger (TV)
- 1967: Anastasia (TV)
- 1968: Die Klasse (TV)
- 1969: Ein Abend zu zweit (TV)
- 1969: Der irische Freiheitskampf (TV series)
- 1970: Geld aus Sachsen, (TV series Der Kurier der Kaiserin)
- 1970: Mein Vater, der Affe und ich
- 1971: Lawinengefahr (TV series Toni und Veronika)
- 1971: Der Geschäftsfreund (TV series Wenn der Vater mit dem Sohne)
- 1971: Rudi, benimm dich!
- 1971: Der Prokurator oder Die Liebe der schönen Bianca (TV)
- 1971: Ein Strich durch die Rechnung (TV series Hamburg Transit)
- 1972–1975: Elternschule (TV series)
- 1976: Schwarzer Sprit (TV series Jörg Preda berichtet)
- 1976: Unterwegs in den Karawanken (TV series Jörg Preda berichtet)
- 1977: Cella oder Die Überwinder (TV)
- 1977: Der Unverbesserliche (TV)
- 1978: Abendfrieden (TV series Derrick)
- 1981: Am Abgrund (TV series Derrick)
- 1982: Die Fahrt nach Lindau (Derrick)
- 1983: Liebe hat ihren Preis (TV series Der Alte)
- 1984: Der Sonne entgegen (TV series)
- 1985: Schumanns Winterreise (TV series Ich heirate eine Familie)
- 1985: Die Tote in der Sauna (Der Alte)
- 1986: 38 – Auch das war Wien
- 1987: Das andere Leben (TV)
- 1987: Anruf in der Nacht (Derrick)
- 1987: Superzwölfer (TV series Tatort)
- 1988: Heiteres Bezirksgericht (TV series)
- 1988: Der Leihopa (TV series)
- 1989: Die Stimme des Mörders (Derrick)
- 1989: Die Kälte des Lebens (Derrick)
- 1990: Roda Roda (TV series)
- 1991: Das Gericht (Der Alte)
- 1992: Tafelspitz
- 1993: Die skandalösen Frauen (TV)
- 1995: Die Nacht der Nächte (TV)
- 1995: Ein fast perfekter Seitensprung
- 1995: Schwarze Tage (TV)
- 1996–2006: Schlosshotel Orth (TV series)
- 1997: Eine fast perfekte Scheidung
- 1997: Lamorte (TV)
- 1998: Ein tiefer Fall (TV series Die Neue – Eine Frau mit Kaliber)
- 1999: Eine fast perfekte Hochzeit
- 1999: Stella di mare – Hilfe, wir erben ein Schiff! (TV)
- 1999: Der Hund muß weg (TV)
- 2000: Aktion C+M+B (TV)
- 2001: Der schöne Tod (TV series Kommissar Rex)
- 2007: Die Geschworene (TV)
- 2007: Muttis Liebling (TV)
- 2007: Lissi und der wilde Kaiser (voice)
- 2008: Zwei Weihnachtsmänner (TV, two episodes)
- 2012: Wilma Wabe (TV series Schnell ermittelt)
- 2014: Der Anständige
