= The Dairymaid of St. Kathrein =

- Directed by: Herbert B. Fredersdorf
- Written by: Theodor Ottawa
- Produced by: Alfred Lehr; Ernest Müller
- Starring: Anita Gutwell; Rudolf Lenz; Rudolf Carl
- Cinematography: Walter Tuch
- Edited by: Brigitte Fredersdorf
- Music by: Carl Loubé
- Production company: ÖFA-Schönbrunn Film
- Distributed by: Sascha Film
- Release date: 11 November 1955
- Running time: 108 minutes
- Country: Austria
- Language: German

The Dairymaid of St Kathrein or The Milkmaid of St. Kathrein (German: Die Sennerin von St. Kathrein) is a 1955 Austrian drama film directed by Herbert B. Fredersdorf and starring Anita Gutwell, Rudolf Lenz and Rudolf Carl. It is a heimatfilm, inspired by the success of the earlier The Forester of the Silver Wood which featured the same leading actors. Another film, Forest Liesel, was made in 1956 by Fredersdorf.

The film's sets were designed by the art director Fritz Jüptner-Jonstorff. It was partly shot in the state of Salzburg.

== Cast ==
- Anita Gutwell as Liesl, die Sennerin
- Rudolf Lenz as Martin
- Rudolf Carl as Hiasl
- Hans Bergen as Wirt
- Franz Eichberger as Otto, Jäger
- Ludwig Geiger as Apotheker
- Gerhard Hofer as Fischer-Tomerl
- Anton Karas as Lehrer
- Harry Kratz as Hansl
- Lotte Ledl as Johanna
- Beppo Louca as 2.Holzfäller
- Hans Putz as Franz
- Heinz Rohn as Bürgermeister
- Albert Rueprecht as Jager-Loisl
- Edd Stavjanik as 1. Holzfäller
- Lola Urban-Kneidinger as Wirtin
- Gerti Wiedner as Vroni

== Bibliography ==
- Fritsche, Maria. Homemade Men in Postwar Austrian Cinema: Nationhood, Genre and Masculinity. Berghahn Books, 2013.
