= Franz Eichberger =

Franz Eichberger may refer to:

- Franz Eichberger (athlete)
- Franz Eichberger (actor)
