= Lotte Ledl =

Austrian actress (1930–2025)

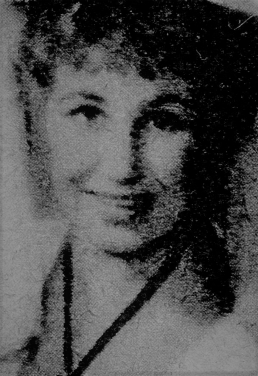
- Ledl c. 1952
- Born: 16 March 1930; Vienna, Austria
- Died: 5 October 2025 (aged 95); Vienna, Austria
- Occupation: Actress
- Works: List of works in film and television
- Title: Kammerschauspielerin
- Spouse: Sepp Riff
- Children: 1

Signature
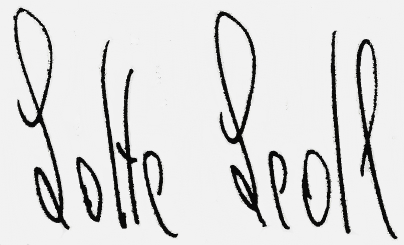

Lotte Ledl (16 March 1930 – 5 October 2025) was an Austrian actress, remembered as a character actress who performed on stage, in film and in television.

Early in her career, Ledl focused on the stage, appearing at the Vienna Burgtheater and festivals in Austria and Germany. She later performed in popular series such as Derrick and Der Alte, and became especially well-known for her role as a cook in the series Schlosshotel Orth. She acted well into her later years and was awarded the title Kammerschauspielerin at age 89.

== Life and career ==
Ledl was born in Vienna on 16 March 1930. She trained dancing from age five. After graduating from high school, Ledl attended the Max Reinhardt Seminar in Vienna from 1949 to 1951 and made her debut as Helena in Shakespeare's A Midsummer Night's Dream in Strobl. She then performed at the Volkstheater from 1952 onward, later at the Theater am Parkring and the Residenztheater in Munich. In 1963, she became a member of the Burgtheater. She performed in Austrian classical plays by Nestroy and Schnitzler, among others, and plays by Goldoni, Lessing and Brecht. She also performed at festivals such as the Ruhrfestspiele, Bregenzer Festspiele, and the Salzburg Festival, and in international productions in Paris and Helsinki.

Ledl appeared in numerous film roles from the mid-1950s onwards. She first starred in Austrian and German Heimatfilm such as Dort oben, wo die Alpen glühen (1956), Holiday am Wörthersee (1956) and Der Jungfrauenkrieg (War of the Maidens, 1957). She rarely played clearly lovable characters, but portrayed the jealous rival, the simple-minded maid, the difficult wife, and the spiteful neighbor. In 1962, Ledl appeared in the German film Street of Temptation, alongside Mario Adorf and Karin Baal, followed by a role in Helmuth M. Backhaus's comedy picture Apartmentzauber the following year. In 1964 she starred opposite Peter Alexander, Rudolf Prack and Gunther Philipp in Wolfgang Liebeneiner's comedy Schweik's Awkward Years. In Volker Schlöndorff's literature film Der junge Törless (1966), she played the role of an innkeeper.

Starting in the 1960s, Ledl also appeared in numerous television plays and series, then appearing from the 1970s in popular crime drama series such as Derrick, Der Alte, Tatort, Kommissar Rex and Schnell ermittelt. In 1994 she played a teacher in the series Tafelspitz.

Her last major role in a series was that of cook Anna Kofler in the series Schlosshotel Orth (1996 to 2006), which made her widely popular. In 2011 she appeared as the goddess Fortuna in "Lumpazivagabundus" at the Theater in der Josefstadt. She played the role of Mrs. Higgins in My Fair Lady at the Vienna Volksoper from 2012 to 2017, and appeared in Berndorf in a version of Miguel Mihura's comedy Katzenzungen in 2019.

In 1994 Ledl initiated the founding of a drama school, Performing Center Austria, where she taught and served on the board until 2014. She also taught at the studio of the Theater an der Wien and the Konservatorium Wien.

In 2019, she was awarded the title Kammerschauspielerin. In his speech at the award ceremony in Vienna, Josef Köpplinger, the director of the Munich Staatstheater am Gärtnerplatz, described her as one of the actors who shaped his career by the way she played the "life lived" ("das gelebte Leben"). Presenting the certificate, Jürgen Meindl named her a "companion in art" and an "unmistakable character actress". She responded that she was glad to be one of the youngest actresses granted this distinction.

=== Personal life ===
Ledl was married to the cinematographer Sepp Riff, who died in 2000. They had a son. After the death of her husband, she married the Kammersänger Kurt Schreibmayer.

Ledl died on 5 October 2025, at the age of 95.

== Awards ==
- 2003 Kulturmedaille des Landes Oberösterreich
- 2019 Kammerschauspielerin

== Films and television ==
Ledl appeared in films, television films (TV) including series (TV series), and as a voice actress:

- 1954: Der Förster vom Silberwald (The Forester of the Silver Wood), as Vroni
- 1956: Dort oben, wo die Alpen glühen as Anna Edelhofer
- 1956: Försterliesel (Forest Liesel), as Zenzi
- 1956: Holiday am Wörthersee
- 1957: Der Jungfrauenkrieg (War of the Maidens)
- 1958: Ein Lied geht um die Welt (A Song Goes Round the World)
- 1959: Besuch aus heiterem Himmel
- 1960: Jenseits des Rheins
- 1962: Straße der Verheißung (Street of Temptation)
- 1963: Apartment-Zauber
- 1963: Liliom (TV)
- 1964: Schwejks Flegeljahre (Schweik's Awkward Years)
- 1965: Der Alpenkönig und der Menschenfeind
- 1965: Der junge Törless (Young Törless)
- 1965: Heidi
- 1967: Anastasia (TV)
- 1970: Mein Vater, der Affe und ich (My Father, the Ape and I)
- 1971: Rudi, benimm dich! (Rudi, Behave!)
- 1978: Abendfrieden (TV series Derrick)
- 1983: Liebe hat ihren Preis (TV series Der Alte)
- 1986: 38 – Auch das war Wien ('38 – Vienna Before the Fall)
- 1987: Superzwölfer (TV series Tatort)
- 1988: Heiteres Bezirksgericht (TV series)
- 1992: Tafelspitz
- 1996–2006: Schlosshotel Orth (TV series)
- 1997: Lamorte (TV)
- 1999: Stella di mare – Hilfe, wir erben ein Schiff! (TV)
- 2001: Der schöne Tod (TV series Kommissar Rex - Inspector Rex)
- 2007: Muttis Liebling (TV)
- 2007: Lissi und der wilde Kaiser (voice)
- 2012: Wilma Wabe (TV series Schnell ermittelt - Fast Forward)
