= Riff (surname) =

Riff is a German language surname. It stems from a reduced form of the male given name Ricfried. Notable people with the name include:

- Emma Riff (born 2000), French modern pentathlete
- Sepp Riff (1928–2000), Austrian cinematographer
