= Rudolf Lenz =

Austrian actor

- Born: 25 May 1920; Graz, Austria
- Died: 12 July 1987 (aged 67); Gschwall, West Germany
- Occupation: Film actor
- Years active: 1951–1984

Rudolf Lenz (25 May 1920 – 12 July 1987) was an Austrian actor.

== Selected filmography ==
- The Forester of the Silver Wood (1954)
- Victoria in Dover (1954)
- The Dairymaid of St. Kathrein (1955)
- Forest Liesel (1956)
- And Who Is Kissing Me? (1956)
- The Hunter of Fall (1956)
- The Poacher of the Silver Wood (1957)
- The Priest and the Girl (1958)
- World on a Wire (1973)
- Fox and His Friends (1975)
- The Roaring Fifties (1983)
