= His Daughter is Called Peter (1955 film) =

1955 film by Gustav Fröhlich

- Directed by: Gustav Fröhlich
- Written by: Edith Zellweker (novel); Ilse von Gasteiger; Ernst Welisch; Gustav Fröhlich
- Produced by: Alfred Lehr
- Starring: Sabine Eggerth; Wolf Albach-Retty; Josef Meinrad; Gretl Schörg
- Cinematography: Sepp Riff
- Edited by: Raimund Warta
- Music by: Erwin Halletz
- Production company: Schönbrunn-Film
- Distributed by: Sascha Film
- Release date: 2 September 1955
- Running time: 95 minutes
- Country: Austria
- Language: German

His Daughter is Called Peter (German: Seine Tochter ist der Peter) is a 1955 Austrian drama film directed by Gustav Fröhlich and starring Sabine Eggerth, Wolf Albach-Retty and Josef Meinrad. The film was a remake of a 1936 Austrian film of the same name. Both films were based on a novel by Edith Zellweker.

It was made at the Schönbrunn Studios in Vienna.

== Cast ==
- Sabine Eggerth as Elisabeth 'Peter' Klaar
- Wolf Albach-Retty as Ingenieur Max Klaar, ihr Vater
- Josef Meinrad as Dr. Felix Weininger
- Gretl Schörg as Nora Christian
- Ruth Johansson as Helga
- Lucie Englisch as Kathi, Haushälterin bei Ing. Klaar
- Rudolf Carl as Rudolf Praxmeier
- Harry Kratz as Peperl
- Fritz Eckhardt as Gendarmeriebeamter
- Erik Frey as Martin, Filmregisseur
- Hans Thimig as Zimmerkellner
- Felicitas Ruhm as Stubenmädchen
- Dia-Lucca Ballett as Tänzer
- Renate Boucek
- Traute Brexner as Ballett Solistin
- Willy Dirtl as Ballett Soloist
- Hubert Hendrik as Ballett Soloist
- Michael Janisch as der Autofahrer
- Jenny Liese
- Hans Putz
- Walter Stummvoll as Doktor Fleischhaher

== Bibliography ==
- Fritsche, Maria. Homemade Men in Postwar Austrian Cinema: Nationhood, Genre and Masculinity. Berghahn Books, 2013.
