= Funeral in Berlin (film) =

1966 film by Guy Hamilton

- American film poster
- Directed by: Guy Hamilton
- Screenplay by: Evan Jones
- Based on: Funeral in Berlin by Len Deighton
- Produced by: Charles D. Kasher
- Starring: Michael Caine; Paul Hubschmid; Oskar Homolka; Eva Renzi
- Cinematography: Otto Heller
- Edited by: John Bloom
- Music by: Konrad Elfers
- Production companies: Lowndes Productions; Jovera S.A.
- Distributed by: Paramount Pictures
- Release dates: 22 December 1966 (US); 23 February 1967 (UK)
- Running time: 102 minutes
- Country: United Kingdom
- Languages: English; German

Funeral in Berlin is a 1966 British spy film directed by Guy Hamilton and based on the 1964 novel of the same name by Len Deighton. It is the second of three 1960s films starring Michael Caine as the character Harry Palmer that followed the characters from the initial film, The Ipcress File (1965). The third film was Billion Dollar Brain (1967).

== Plot ==
British secret agent Harry Palmer is sent to Berlin by his superior Colonel Ross to arrange the defection of Colonel Stok, a prominent Soviet intelligence officer. Palmer is sceptical but links up with Johnny Vulkan, an old German friend and former criminal associate, who now runs the Berlin station for British intelligence.

Palmer makes a rendezvous with Stok in the Soviet zone of the divided city, finding him eccentric and likeable. Stok asks for the defection to be managed by Otto Kreutzman, a West Berlin criminal who has organised a number of recent escapes. When Palmer returns to the western sector he meets Samantha Steel, a model. He spends the night with her, but is suspicious of her forward manner. The next day he has his police contacts establish her identity and arranges for a criminal to burgle her apartment, where several different false passports are discovered.

Meanwhile, Palmer arranges a deal with Kreutzman to bring Stok across the wall in return for $60,000 and a set of genuine documents meeting certain specifications. Palmer then returns to London to report. Ross is convinced that Stok's defection is genuine and dismisses Palmer's suspicions that Steel is a spy. Ross gives full authorisation for Palmer to return to Berlin to complete the deal; a man at Intelligence headquarters named Hallam provides the documents, which are in the name of Paul Louis Broum.

The plan devised by Kreutzman is to arrange a burial and bring Stok across the border in a coffin. When Palmer again meets Steel, she admits that she is a Mossad spy and that she is in Berlin to hunt down Paul Louis Broum – a war criminal, now operating under an alias, who stole millions of pounds from Jews during the Second World War.

Kreutzman goes over to the East to supervise the important defection personally. Palmer waits with Kreutzman's henchman on the western side of the border, where the coffin is delivered to an abandoned warehouse. When it is opened, however, Palmer finds Kreutzman's dead body. Vulkan suddenly knocks Palmer unconscious and takes the Broum documents, but they are stolen in turn by Steel and two other Israeli agents.

When Palmer informs Ross about the Broum documents, he is told that towards the end of the war, Broum murdered a resistance fighter called Johnny Vulkan at Belsen concentration camp and assumed his identity. Ross got hold of the documents and used them to blackmail Broum into working for him. He now orders Palmer to kill Broum, but Palmer allows him to get away instead. Palmer later meets Stok, who is in West Berlin for a routine visit. The Russian confirms that his supposed defection was just a trap to get rid of Kreutzman. He even jokes that if Palmer ever wishes to defect to the East, he should ask Vulkan, who "knows the way".

Meanwhile, the supposed Vulkan goes to Steel's flat, murders an Israeli agent, and gets the documents back; Palmer is blamed for this. Broum meets with Hallam, who realises Palmer had substituted forgeries for the documents. Hallam goes to Palmer, claiming he was sent by Ross to get the real documents back. Palmer forces him to admit that he is in league with Broum to get them out of Berlin and that they now intend to use them in order to claim the Nazi loot that Broum deposited in a Swiss bank.

Palmer makes Hallam go with him to a quiet part of the Berlin Wall through which Broum and Hallam intend to slip into the East, but Broum kills Hallam and is subsequently mistaken for Palmer and killed by Israeli agents. Palmer then gives the Israelis the documents.

Back in London, Ross is satisfied that the dead "Vulkan" will be taken for another martyr shot while escaping to the West. Offered a bonus for his work, Palmer refuses and leaves.

== Cast ==
- Michael Caine as Harry Palmer/Edmund Dorf
- Paul Hubschmid as Johnny Vulkan/Paul Louis Broum
- Oskar Homolka as Colonel Stok
- Eva Renzi as Samantha "Sam" Steel.
- Guy Doleman as Colonel Ross
- Hugh Burden as Hallam
- Heinz Schubert as Aaron Levine
- Wolfgang Völz as Werner
- Thomas Holtzmann as Reinhardt
- Sarah Brackett as Babcock
- Günter Meisner as Otto Kreutzman
- Herbert Fux as Artur
- Rainer Brandt as Benjamin
- Rachel Gurney as Mrs Ross
- John Abineri as Otto Rukel
- Marthe Keller as Brigit
- David Glover as Chico

== Production ==
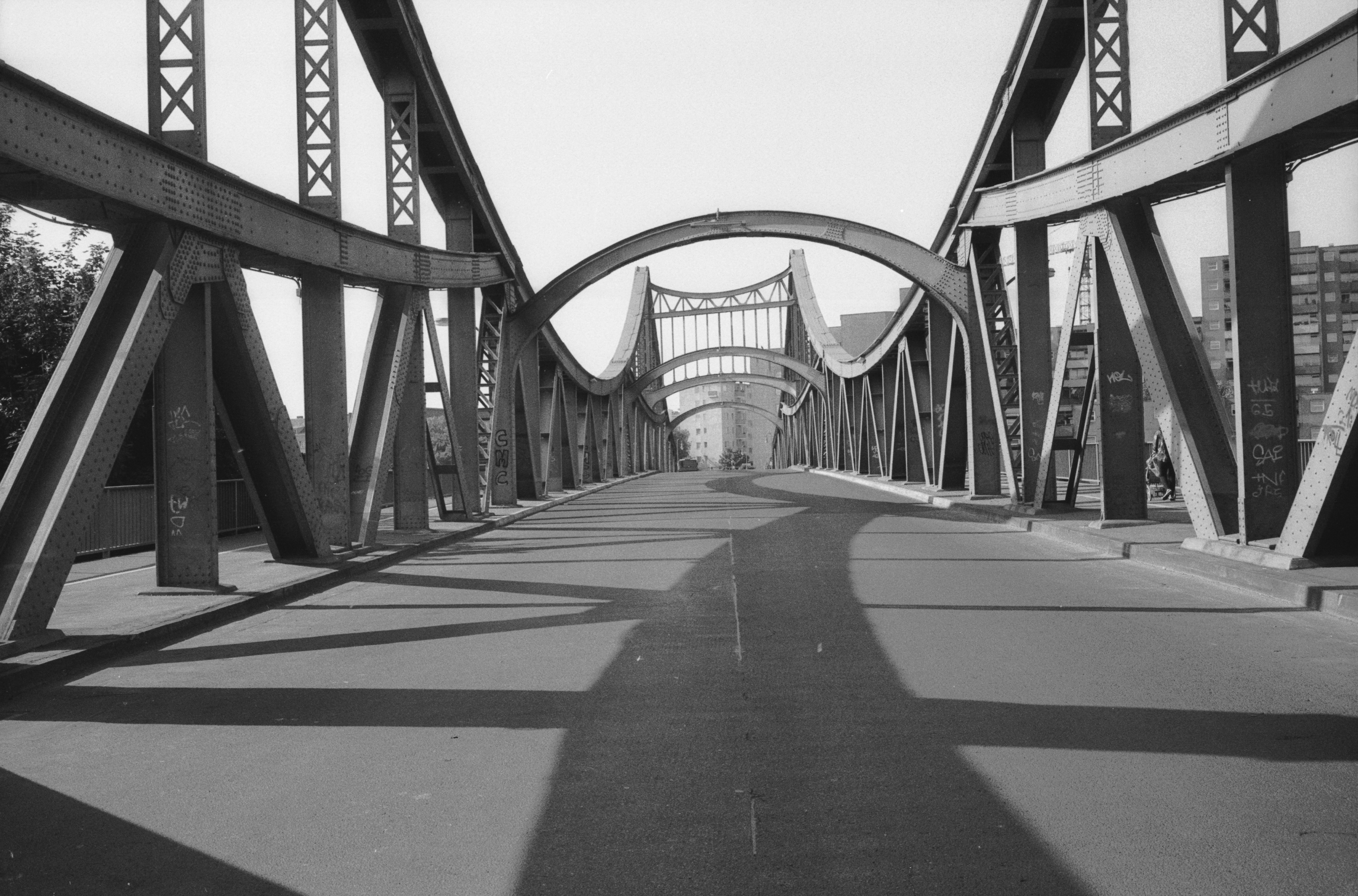
The Swinemünder Brücke was used to represent the Bornholmer Straße border crossing.

In a short documentary film entitled "Man at the Wall: The Making of Funeral in Berlin" produced by Paramount Pictures about the production of the movie, Michael Caine says that director Guy Hamilton – who directed Goldfinger and three later James Bond features – would make on-set improvisations to the script based on his own personal experiences working for British military intelligence during World War II.

Funeral in Berlin was filmed partly on location in Berlin. Harry Palmer travels to the Soviet zone through Checkpoint Charlie. He flies into Tempelhof Airport. The Swinemünder Brücke was used for the coffin border crossing. The Kurfürstendamm, Hotel am Zoo and Berlin Hilton also feature.

Production design was by Ken Adam, who had won a BAFTA for Best Production Design for his earlier Harry Palmer film The Ipcress File.

== Home media ==
Funeral in Berlin was released as a Region 1 DVD on 14 August 2001. It was also released on Blu-ray on 26 May 2020.

== Reception ==
On the review aggregator website Rotten Tomatoes, 60% of 10 critics' reviews are positive. In Kiss Kiss Bang Bang, Pauline Kael wrote that the film was more entertaining than The Quiller Memorandum, but added that Palmer "is supposed to gain new humanity when he sees that the Israeli agents really believe in principles. But about the only thing that made Palmer amusing was his shabby small-time "professional's" indifference to the larger stakes: improve his character and you take away the only character he had."
