= A Woman Needs Loving =

1969 film

- Directed by: Robert Azderball
- Written by: Dean Finnie
- Produced by: Thilo Theilen
- Starring: Eva Renzi; Horst Janson; Barbara Rütting
- Cinematography: Charly Steinberger
- Music by: Jacques Loussier
- Production company: Thilo Theilen Filmproduktion
- Distributed by: J. Arthur Rank Film
- Release date: 31 January 1969
- Running time: 88 minutes
- Country: West Germany
- Language: German

A Woman Needs Loving (German: Eine Frau sucht Liebe) is a 1969 West German drama film directed by Robert Azderball and starring Eva Renzi, Horst Janson, and Barbara Rütting. The film's sets were designed by the art director Robert Stratil. Although produced on a comparatively low budget, it was marketed in a way that anticipated the exploitation films of the early 1970s rather than the New German Cinema.

== Synopsis ==
Library assistant Jane goes out to the park with her boyfriend George, but is traumatised when he is bitten by a dog. Suffering a mental breakdown, she is treated unsuccessfully by a psychiatrist while George attempts to take her back to the park in order to cure her through reenactment therapy. During her breakdown, she experiments with a lesbian relationship.

== Cast ==
- Eva Renzi as Jane
- Horst Janson as George
- Barbara Rütting as Helen
- Hans Schweikart as Bookseller Terkins
- Hans Clarin as Psychiatrist
- Katrin Schaake as Girlfriend
- Eva Ingeborg Scholz as Customer

== Bibliography ==
- Bock, Hans-Michael & Bergfelder, Tim. The Concise CineGraph. Encyclopedia of German Cinema. Berghahn Books, 2009.
- Flowers, John & Frizler, Paul. Psychotherapists on Film, 1899-1999. McFarland, 2004.
- Rabkin, Leslie Y. The Celluloid Couch: An Annotated International Filmography of the Mental Health Professional in the Movies and Television, from the Beginning to 1990. Scarecrow Press, 1998.
