= Paul Hubschmid =

Swiss actor (1917–2002)

- Hubschmid in 1968
- Born: 20 July 1917; Schoenenwerd, Switzerland
- Died: 1 January 2002 (aged 84); Berlin, Germany
- Years active: 1938–1992
- Spouse(s): Ursula von Teubern (1942-1963) (her death); Eva Renzi (1967-1980) (divorced); Irène Schiesser (1985-2002) (his death)

Paul Hubschmid (German: [paʊ̯l ˈhuːpˌʃmiːt]; 20 July 1917 – 1 January 2002) was a Swiss actor. He was most notable for his role as Henry Higgins in the German stage production of My Fair Lady. In his Hollywood appearances, he was billed as Paul Christian. He appeared in dozens of films and television series between 1938 and 1992, many of which were German and International productions.

== Life ==
=== Childhood, Youth, Education ===
Hubschmid's parents were Paul Hubschmid Snr., a canteen manager at the Bally shoe factory in Schönenwerd, and Alice Noël, daughter of a chef and a journalist. She wrote for the Aargauer Tagblatt and later managed an advice column for the Swiss magazine femina. Hubschmid studied acting for two years at the Max Reinhardt Seminar in Vienna. To finance his studies, his mother requested a scholarship from Iwan Bally, the Swiss co-owner of the Bally shoe company.

=== First Roles ===
After completing his training, Hubschmid made his stage debut at the German Volkstheater in Vienna. He then performed at the Theater in Josefstadt and went on to appear in Berlin, Düsseldorf, and Frankfurt. In 1938, Hubschmid landed his first film role, in the Swiss feature Fusilier Wipf. His portrayal of the title character, recruit “Füsilier Wipf”, made the 21-year-old Hubschmid famous in Switzerland.

=== Working in Germany During World War II ===
As a Swiss citizen in Germany during the Nazi regime, where all movie production was controlled by the government, Hubschmid acted in State Films (Staatsauftragsfilme). As a result, after the war, he was unable to secure roles in Switzerland. He later wrote in his memoir that he was ashamed not to have drawn clearer conclusions in view of the "atrocities of the Nazi regime" and that it was "explainable at most by my youth and my Swiss passport".

=== Private Life ===
In 1941, Hubschmid married actress Ursula von Teubern in Vienna. In January 1945, their son (Peter Christian Hubschmid) was born in Bad Ischl, far from the war, where Hubschmid was making a romantic comedy. After the death of his wife in 1963, Hubschmid remarried. He wed actress Eva Renzi in 1967, and adopted her daughter Anouschka. The couple divorced in 1980. Hubschmid married a third time, in 1985 to actress Irène Schiesser (1950–2018), with whom he lived until his death.

=== Hollywood career ===
In 1948, Hubschmid signed a five-year contract with Universal Pictures. He was billed as Paul Christian, owing to concerns that his real name was not marketable in the U.S.

With his stature and striking looks, Christian played heroes and romantic leads. His first Hollywood starring role was alongside Maureen O'Hara and Vincent Price in Bagdad. He also starred in The Thief of Venice, filmed on location, and worked with director Don Siegel on the comedy No Time for Flowers, filmed in Vienna.

Upon returning to Hollywood, Christian starred in the science-fiction film The Beast from 20,000 Fathoms, based on the story by Ray Bradbury. The film became a cult classic and was one of the first movies to feature stop-motion animation by Ray Harryhausen.

=== Return to Europe ===
In 1953, his Universal contract at an end, Hubschmid returned to Germany, resumed his real name, and took on leading roles opposite Marika Rökk in Mask in Blue and Lilo Pulver in The Zürich Engagement. He was considered the “handsomest man in post-war German cinema.”

Hubschmid starred in Fritz Lang's heavily revised remake of two classic silent films he originally conceived and co-wrote with Thea von Harbou. With The Tiger of Eschnapur and The Indian Tomb, Hubschmid achieved international fame.

In 1961, he was cast as Professor Higgins in the German premiere of My Fair Lady at the Theater des Westens in Berlin. The role became his most iconic performance, and he played it over 2000 times. He called it the “greatest stroke of luck” in his stage career.

=== Later Career and Legacy ===
Into the early 1990s, Hubschmid worked in film and television, appearing in numerous European productions and also in British and American films including Funeral in Berlin and Skullduggery. His performances remained highly regarded, and his deep, resonant voice made him a sought-after narrator for documentaries and roles in plays produced for radio.

In recognition of his contributions to cinema and theatre, Hubschmid was awarded the Filmband in Gold in 1980.

Hubschmid retired from acting in 1993 at the age of 76. In his final years, he battled numerous health issues, most notably Parkinson’s Disease. He died on January 1, 2002, aged 84, from a pulmonary embolism. His ashes were scattered in Provence.

== Selected filmography ==
- Fusilier Wipf (1938, Swiss) - Reinhold Wipf
- Maria Ilona (1939, German) - Imre von Hontos, Maria Ilonas Bruder
- Der letzte Appell (1939, German)
- Mir lönd nüd lugg (1940, Swiss) - Hans Landolt
- Mein Traum (1940, Swiss) - Bob Ellis
- Die missbrauchten Liebesbriefe (1940, Swiss) - Wilhelm
- The Rainer Case (1942, German) - Franz Rainer
- My Friend Josephine (1942, German) - Herr Milander
- An Old Heart Becomes Young Again (1943, German) - Willibald Mack
- Wilder Urlaub (1943, Swiss) - Fritz Hablützel
- Love Letters (1944, German) - Robert Wieland
- Der gebieterische Ruf (1944, German) - Ferdinand Hofer
- Das seltsame Fräulein Sylvia (1945, German)
- Gottes Engel sind überall (1948, German) - Jo, ein amerikanischer Soldat
- Arlberg Express - (1948, Austrian) - Hans Leitner
- The Heavenly Waltz (1948, German) - Hans Lieven
- Mysterious Shadows (1949, Austrian) - Dr. Benn Wittich, Biologe u. Chemiker
- Bagdad (1949, US) - Hassan
- Law of Love (1949, German) - Premierleutnant Hofstede
- The Thief of Venice (1950, US / Italian) - Alfiere Lorenzo Contarini
- Palace Hotel (1952, Swiss) - Fredy
- No Time for Flowers (1952, US) - Karl Marek
- Mask in Blue (1953, German) - Armando Cellini
- The Venus of Tivoli (1953, Swiss) - Bölsterli
- The Beast from 20,000 Fathoms (1953, US) - Prof. Tom Nesbitt
- Musik bei Nacht (1953, German) - Robert Ellin
- Life Begins at Seventeen (1953, German) - Ramon Montadeau
- Hungarian Rhapsody (1954, French / German) - Franz Liszt
- Schule für Eheglück (1954) - Justus Schneemann
- Glückliche Reise (1954) - Robert Langen
- Ingrid - Die Geschichte eines Fotomodells - (1955, German) - Robert - Journalist
- The Ambassador's Wife - (1955, German) - John de la Croix
- Rommel's Treasure (1955, Italian) - von Brunner
- Du bist Musik (1956, German) - Paul Heiden & Otto III
- Liebe, die den Kopf verliert (1956) - Conrad Hegner
- The Golden Bridge (1956) - Stefan
- My Husband's Getting Married Today (1956, German) - Georg Lindberg
- Salzburg Stories (1957, German) - Georg
- Glücksritter (1957) - Alexander Haupt
- The Zurich Engagement (1957, German) - Dr. Jean Berner
- Meine schöne Mama (1958) - George
- Voyage to Italy, Complete with Love (1958, German) - Robert Florian
- Scampolo (1958, German) - Roberto Costa
- Ihr 106. Geburtstag (1958) - Alfred Franconi
- La Morte viene dallo Spazio (1958, Italian / French) - John McLaren
- The Tiger of Eschnapur (1959, German) - Harald Berger
- The Indian Tomb (1959, German) - Harald Berger
- Every Day Isn't Sunday (1959) - Karl Brandtstetter
- Liebe, Luft und lauter Lügen (1959) - Herr Häggeli
- Marili (1959) - Robert Orban
- Auskunft im Cockpit (1959)
- Heldinnen (1960, German) - Major von Tellheim
- The Red Hand (1960) - Johnny Zamaris
- Die junge Sünderin (1960) - Alfred Schott
- Festival (1961) - Jack Lambert, Filmstar
- Napoleon II, the Eagle (1961, French) - Prokesch
- Isola Bella (1961) - Götz Renner
- Only a Woman (1962) - Martin Bohlen
- Eleven Years and One Day (1963, German) - Tony Cameron
- And So to Bed (1963, Austrian) - Diplomat
- Mission to Hell (1964, Italian / German) - Werner Homfeld
- Games of Desire (1964, German / French) - Elliot
- Le Grain de sable (1964, French / German) - Alain Compton - un gangster
- Marry Me, Cherie (1964, Austrian) - Dr. Andreas Gollhofer
- Mozambique (1964, British / German) - Commaro
- Me and the Forty Year Old Man - (1965, French) - Jean-Marc Oesterlin
- The Majordomo (1965, French) - Docteur Ventoux / Le 'chat'
- The Swedish Girl (1965, German) - Prof. Dr. Martin Wiegand
- The Gentlemen (1965, German) - Pflügeli
- Dis-moi qui tuer (1965, French) - Reiner Dietrich
- I Am Looking for a Man (1966, German) - Baron Federsen
- The Spy with Ten Faces (1966, Italian / German) - Paul Finney, the Upperseven
- Playgirl (1966, German) - Joachim Steigenwald
- Living It Up (1966, French) - Francesco Jimenez
- Funeral in Berlin (1966, British) - Johnny Vulkan
- Ein Gewissen verlangen (1966)
- Manon 70 (1968, French) - Simon
- In Enemy Country (1968, US) - Frederich
- Negresco (1968, German) - Parrish
- Taste of Excitement (1969, British) - Hans Beiber
- Hotel Royal (1969, TV film, German) - Van Cleef
- Skullduggery (1970, US) - Vancruysen
- Wie ein Blitz (1970, TV Mini-Series, German) - Ned Parker
- Versuchung im Sommerwind (1972) - Freund des Professors
- Bolero (1983) - Malinckroth
- Klassezämekunft (1988, Swiss) - Rolf Zeller
- Jolly Joker (1989–1991, TV Series, German) - Arthur Brecht
- Linda (1991, German) - Father
- The Rings of Saturn (1992, movie for TV, German) - Rissell

=== Awards ===
- 1980: Filmband in Gold

=== References ===
- Halliwell, Leslie (1981). Halliwell's Who's Who in the Movies. Harper-Collins. ISBN 0-06-093507-3.
- Katz, Ephraim. The Film Encyclopedia (5th ed.). Revised by Fred Klein & Ronald Dean Nolen. New York: Collins. ISBN 0-06-074214-3.
- "Füsilier Wipf is dead" (in German).
- Stephanie D’heil (ed.). "Paul Hubschmid". Steffi-Line.de.
- "Actors 8".
- Paul Hubschmid: Handsome Man, What Now? Memories. Albrecht Knaus, Munich 1998, ISBN 978-3-8135-2593-9.
