= No Time for Flowers =

1952 film by Don Siegel

- Directed by: Don Siegel
- Screenplay by: Hans Wilhelm; László Vadnay
- Produced by: Mort Briskin; Maurie M. Suess
- Starring: Viveca Lindfors; Paul Christian; Ludwig Stössel
- Cinematography: Tony Braun
- Edited by: Henrietta Brunsch
- Music by: Herschel Burke Gilbert
- Production company: Morjay Productions
- Distributed by: RKO Pictures
- Release dates: December 25, 1952 (New York City); January 31, 1953 (US)
- Running time: 83 minutes
- Country: United States
- Language: English

No Time for Flowers is a 1952 American romantic comedy film directed by Don Siegel and starring Viveca Lindfors, Paul Christian and Ludwig Stössel. Featuring a Cold War setting and some location shooting in Vienna, it was distributed by RKO Pictures.

== Plot ==
A young girl's loyalty to the Communist Party is tested in Prague when she falls in love with an attaché who has just arrived from the United States.

== Cast ==
- Viveca Lindfors as Anna Svoboda
- Paul Christian as Karl Marek
- Ludwig Stössel as Papa
- Adrienne Gessner as Mama
- Peter Preses as Emil Dadak
- Manfred Inger as Kudelka
- Peter Czejke as Stefan Svoboda
- Fred Berger as Anton Novotny
- Oskar Wegrostek as Johann Burian
- Helmut Janosch as Milo
- Hilde Jaeger as Mrs. Pilski
- Pepi Glöckner-Kramer as Flower Woman
- Reinhold Seigert as Police Guard
- Willi Schumann as Police Sergeant
- Ilka Windish as Woman Drunk
- Anton Mitterwurzer as Sedlacek
- Teo Prokop as Czech peasant
- Robert Eckert as Taxi driver
- Peter Brand as First soldier
- Karl Schwetter as Second soldier

== Critical Appraisal ==
Judith M. Kass offers this assessment: “No Time for Flowers is a largely unsuccessful attempt at comedy in which Viveca Lindfors portrays a Ninotchka-like Czech, eager for both advancement in the Communist world and in the luxuries of the West.

== Theme ==
Biographer Judith M. Kass notes this thematic element in the film:

The fear that one can incriminate oneself or others, no matter how innocent a remark may be, and that no one can be trusted, are the main causes for anxiety in No Time for Flowers. Coupled with economic deprivation, this spiritual poverty is even harder to bear. Existing with these tribulations is a good-natured, more natural desire to be open, free to fall in love, and try for some happiness, however limited.

== Sources ==
- Kass, Judith M. (1975). Don Siegel: The Hollywood Professionals, Volume 4 (1975 ed.). New York: Tanvity Press. p. 207. ISBN 0-498-01665-X.
- Mayer, Geoff. Historical Dictionary of Crime Films. Scarecrow Press, 2012.
