= Mysterious Shadows =

1949 film

- Film poster
- Directed by: G. W. Pabst
- Written by: Gertrude Pabst; Walter von Hollander
- Produced by: Georg Wilhelm Pabst
- Starring: Paul Hubschmid; Ilse Werner; Elfe Gerhart
- Cinematography: Helmut Ashley; Hans Schneeberger
- Music by: Roland Kovac; Alois Melichar
- Production company: Pabst-Kiba-Filmproduktionsgesellschaft
- Distributed by: Union Film
- Release date: 19 August 1949
- Running time: 94 minutes
- Country: Austria
- Language: German

Mysterious Shadows (German: Geheimnisvolle Tiefe) is a 1949 Austrian drama film directed by G. W. Pabst and starring Paul Hubschmid, Ilse Werner, and Elfe Gerhart. It was shown at the Venice Film Festival. It was shot at the Rosenhügel Studios in Vienna and at the Hoher Dachstein ice caves. The film's sets were designed by the art director Isabella Schlichting and Werner Schlichting.

== Plot ==
Dr. Wittich is a passionate speleologist who devotes more time to his research than to his fiancée, Cornelia. As a result, she turns to the wealthy industrialist Roy, whom she eventually marries. However, her heart truly belongs to the explorer, and she is drawn back to him. When they finally venture together into a cave system in the Pyrenees and explore its "mysterious depths," they perish within it.

== Cast ==
- Paul Hubschmid as Dr. Benn Wittich
- Ilse Werner as Cornelia
- Stefan Skodler as Robert Roy
- Elfe Gerhart as Charlotte
- Hermann Thimig as Heinemann
- Maria Eis as Frau Willard
- Harry Leyn as Ein Levantiner
- Ulrich Bettac as Kessler, Compagnon Roys
- Otto Schmöle as Präsident Ries
- Robert Tessen as Bobby Ries
- Helli Servi as Frl. Krümmel
- Ernst Waldbrunn as Herr Peters
- Ida Russka as Frau Peters
- Josef Fischer as Sekretär Pfeifer
- Josefine Berghofer as Sekretärin Bernhard
- Gaby Philipp as Zofe Lizzi
- Franz Eichberger as Bergführer Nino

== Bibliography ==
- Rentschler, Eric. The Films of G.W. Pabst: An Extraterritorial Cinema. Rutgers University Press, 1990.
