= Sabine Eggerth =

German actress (1943–2017)

- Born: 9 June 1943; Berlin, Nazi Germany
- Died: 28 January 2017 (aged 73); Lugano, Switzerland
- Occupation: Actress
- Years active: 1953–1972

Sabine Eggerth (9 June 1943 – 28 January 2017) was a German film and television actress. Eggerth was a child actor who made her debut aged ten in Anna Louise and Anton (1953). She played the title role in the 1955 film His Daughter is Called Peter. In the 1960s she switched to playing grown-up roles in television series.

She married the film director Rolf von Sydow.

== Selected filmography ==
- Anna Louise and Anton (1953)
- Maxie (1954)
- His Daughter is Called Peter (1955)
- As Long as the Roses Bloom (1956)
- That's No Way to Land a Man (1959)
- Salto Mortale (1969–1972, TV series)

== Bibliography ==
- Fritsche, Maria. Homemade Men in Postwar Austrian Cinema: Nationhood, Genre and Masculinity. Berghahn Books, 2013.
