= David Glover (actor) =

English television actor (1927–2015)

- Born: 24 September 1927; London, England
- Died: 16 February 2015 (aged 87); London, England
- Occupation: Television actor

David Glover (24 September 1927 – 16 February 2015) was an English television actor. He appeared in British television series and films The Ipcress File, Funeral in Berlin, Carry On... Follow That Camel, The Avengers, Z-Cars, Priest of Love, The Bill, Edward II, Castles, Dracula and others.

== Acting credits ==
Production	Notes	Role
Dentist in the Chair	Film (1960)	Newman
Dentist on the Job	Film (1961)	Mr. Bull
Mystery Submarine	Film (1963)	PO Tel. Hubbard
Marriage Lines	"The Parting" (1963)	David
The Ipcress File	Film (1965)	Chilcott-Oakes
Fahrenheit 451	Film (1966)	Book Person: 'The Pickwick Papers'
Funeral in Berlin	Film (1966)	Chico
Carry On... Follow That Camel	Film (1967)	Hotel Manager
The Avengers	"The See-Through Man" (1967)	Wilton
The Avengers	"Noon Doomsday" (1968)	Dr. Carson
ITV Playhouse	"Premiere: The Night of Talavera" (1968)	Capt. Dynevore
Z-Cars	2 episodes:"Alibi" (1969)	Det. Insp. Tyson
Barlow at Large	"Come to Dust" (1971)	Defending Counsel
The Protectors	"It Could Be Practically Anywhere on the Island" (1973)	Doctor
Clayhanger	"The Adventure" (1976)	Second Man in Foyer
Priest of Love	Film (1981)	Warren Gallery Reporter
On the Line	6 episodes (1982)	Steve Bateman
Cyrano de Bergerac	TV film (1985)	Marquis 2
Black Silk	"Without Prejudice" (1985)	
Starting Out	"Taken on Trust" (1986)	Mr. Brown
Yes Minister	"Man Overboard" (1987)	Cabinet Member
The Beat	Film (1988)	
The Bill	"The Right Thing to Do" (1991)	Watson-Browne
Edward II	Film (1991)	Chorus of Nobility
Boon	"Love or Money" (1992)	Celebrity
Charles and Diana: Unhappily Ever After	TV film (1992)	Clinic Director
Maigret	"Maigret and the Minister" (1993)	Arthur Nicoud
The Inspector Alleyn Mysteries	"Death in a White Tie" (1993)	Harcourt
If You See God, Tell Him	1 episode (1993)	Businessman 1
The House of Eliott	1 episode (1994)	Returning Officer
Princess Caraboo	Film (1994)	Musician
Judicial Consent	Film (1994)	Bailiff
Castles	1 episode (1995)	Hotel manager
Blue Juice	Film (1995)	Hotel Manager
Shooting Fish	Film (1997)	Prison Governor
Lady Audley's Secret	TV movie (2000)	Marriner
Kavanagh QC	"The End of Law" (2001)	Justice Trencher
Conspiracy	TV film (2001)	Supervising Butler
Red Cap	"Cover Story" (2003)	Robert Glover
Casualty	"Family Day" (2005)	Arthur
Rosamunde Pilcher	"Segel der Liebe" (2005)	
The Amazing Mrs Pritchard	4 episodes (2006)	Speaker
Dracula	TV film (2006)	Stephens
Lewis	"Old School Ties" (2007)	Rev Kennedy
Sense and Sensibility	2 episodes (2008)	Foot
