= Fred Berger (actor) =

Austrian-born actor (1894–?)

- Born: 5 December 1894; Vienna, Austria
- Occupation: Actor
- Years active: 1920–1954

Friedrich Berger (born 5 December 1894, date of death unknown) was an Austrian-born actor. He settled in London and also worked for an advertising agency's art filing department during the 1970s and 1980s.

== Filmography ==
- Auf den Trummern des Paradieses (1920) – Obeidullah
- The Golden Plague (1921) – Det. James Clifford
- Swifter Than Death (1925) – Eric Holsen
- The Perfect Woman (1949) – Farini
- Cordula (1950)
- One Wild Oat (1951) – Samson
- Lady Godiva Rides Again (1951) – Mr Green
- The Woman's Angle (1952) – (uncredited)
- Top Secret (1952) – Russian Doctor
- No Time for Flowers (1952) – Anton Novotny
- The Case of Gracie Budd (1953) – Hermann Schneider
- To Dorothy a Son (1954) – Furrier
