= Vagabonds (film) =

1949 film

- Directed by: Rolf Hansen
- Written by: Juliane Kay (play); Rolf Hansen; Tibor Yost
- Produced by: Friedrich Erban
- Starring: Paula Wessely; Attila Hörbiger; Adrienne Gessner
- Cinematography: Oskar Schnirch
- Edited by: Herma Sandtner
- Music by: Anton Profes
- Production companies: Österreichische Film; Schönbrunn-Film
- Distributed by: Sascha Film; Bavaria Film (Germany)
- Release date: 18 October 1949
- Running time: 108 minutes
- Country: Austria
- Language: German

Vagabonds (German: Vagabunden) is a 1949 Austrian drama film directed by Rolf Hansen and starring Paula Wessely, Attila Hörbiger and Adrienne Gessner. The film's premiere was attended by the President Karl Renner and members of the government. It was shot at Salzburg Studios and on location in the city. The film's sets were designed by the art director Julius von Borsody. It was released in West Germany on 3 March 1950 by Bavaria Film. It is also known by the alternative title Vagabunden der Liebe.

== Cast ==
- Paula Wessely as Dr. Elisabeth Kamma
- Attila Hörbiger as Dr. Peter Kamma
- Adrienne Gessner as Mademoiselle Belet
- Elfe Gerhart as Gaby Elder
- Erik Frey as Dr. Christian Heßler
- Karl Ehmann as Mattek
- Siegfried Breuer as Andy Karr
- Helli Servi as Fräulein Fuchs
- Alma Seidler as Eine Mutter
- Mimi Stelzer as Frau Vösler
- Hilde Schultz-Pfaudler as Tante Olga
- Hermann Erhardt as Professor Kramer
- Oskar Wegrostek as Ein Vater
- Karl Schwetter as Dr. Eibl
- Kurt Heintel as Ulmansky

== Bibliography ==
- Fritsche, Maria. Homemade Men in Postwar Austrian Cinema: Nationhood, Genre and Masculinity. Berghahn Books, 2013.
