= Bagdad (film) =

1949 film by Charles Lamont

- VHS cover
- Directed by: Charles Lamont
- Screenplay by: Robert Hardy Andrews
- Story by: Tamara Hovey
- Produced by: Robert Arthur
- Starring: Maureen O'Hara; Paul Christian; Vincent Price
- Cinematography: Russell Metty
- Edited by: Russell Schoengarth
- Music by: Frank Skinner
- Color process: Technicolor
- Production company: Universal Pictures
- Distributed by: Universal Pictures
- Release date: November 23, 1949
- Running time: 82 minutes
- Country: United States
- Language: English
- Budget: $620,000-$850,000 (est).
- Box office: $1.6 million

Bagdad is a 1949 American adventure film directed by Charles Lamont and starring Maureen O'Hara, Paul Hubschmid (billed as "Paul Christian"), and Vincent Price. O'Hara called it "a 'tits and sand' picture...one of the films that I point to as part of my decorative years but audiences love them."

== Plot ==
It tells the story of a Bedouin princess who returns to Baghdad after being educated in England. She finds that her father has been murdered by a group of renegades. She is hosted by the Pasha, the corrupt representative of the national government. She is also courted by Prince Hassan, who is falsely accused of the murder. The plot revolves around her attempts to bring the killer to justice while being courted by the Pasha.

== Cast ==
- Maureen O'Hara as Princess Marjan
- Paul Hubschmid as Hassan
- Vincent Price as Pasha Ali Nadim
- John Sutton as Raizul
- Jeff Corey as Mohammed Jao
- Frank Puglia as Saleel
- David Bauer as Mahmud (as David Wolfe)
- Fritz Leiber as Emir
- Otto Waldis as Marengo
- Leon Belasco as Beggar
- Anne P. Kramer as Tirza (as Ann Pearce)
- Dewey Robinson as Blackrobe (uncredited)

== Production ==
In April 1949 Universal announced the film would star Yvonne de Carlo and Swiss actor Paul Christian. It was Christian's Hollywood debut - he had been set to star in Sword in the Desert but was ruled out due to an eye infection. De Carlo fell ill and so Universal borrowed Maureen O'Hara from 20th Century Fox; it was O'Hara's first film at Universal.

Filming started in June. It took place on location at the Alabama Hills in Lone Pine, California. O'Hara wrote in her memoirs that she was stung by a scorpion a few days into the shoot "but other than that it was an uneventful experience."

Vincent Price appeared in the movie as the last in a four-picture contract he had with Universal. “All through one week’s filming in the blistering sun, take after take was being ruined by the inhuman howls of a lady camel,” wrote Vincent Price in his book The Book of Joe. “No one could make her stop, and the furious reprimand by the sound man to the animal owner brought out the news that the camel must have fallen in love with one of the cast. It couldn’t be anyone she was used to, because it had never happened before and the crew had been around the animals for a week before we arrived. Since there were only three men, including myself, in the company and lady camels fall only for human men, it must be one of us.” After the other two men were presented to the camel with no reaction. “...the moment I appeared the great lumpy beast gave forth with the most disturbing screams of passionate anguish. I was the object of her affection and also the friendly derision of the entire company, but the film was able to continue by eliminating this camel from any scene I was in.”

== Reception ==
According to O'Hara the film "made Universal a fortune and Universal purchased part of my contract from Fox as a result of that success."
