= Alma Seidler =

Austrian actress (1899–1977)

Alma Seidler (1 June 1899 – 8 December 1977) was an Austrian actress. She was member of the Burgtheater for over 50 years.

== Biography ==
Alma Seidler was born in Leoben, the daughter of Ernst Seidler von Feuchtenegg. The later Burgtheater director Albert Heine was her teacher and sponsor. From 1918 to 1977, she was actress at the Burgtheater and made her debut in Ibsen's Wildente in 1919. Since 1960, she was honorary member of the Burgtheater. She also performed at the Salzburg Festival.

Seidler was married to the Burgtheater actor and director Karl Eidlitz, with whom she had a son.

Grave of Alma Seidler

She died in Vienna on 8 December 1977 and is buried in a grave of honor at the Vienna Central Cemetery.

== Awards ==
- Kammerschauspielerin (February 1928);
- Decoration of Honour in Gold of Honour for Services to the Republic of Austria (1955);
- Ehrenmedaille der Bundeshauptstadt Wien (1959);
- Josef Kainz Medal for Mrs. Dowey in Die Medaillen der alten Dame (Barry/Koval) (1959);
- Honorary member Burgtheater (1960);
- Austrian Decoration for Science and Art, 1st class (1968);
- Großes Silbernes Ehrenzeichen des Landes Wien (1976);
- Grand Decoration of Honour in Silver for Services to the Republic of Austria (1977);

== Legacy ==
In 1978, the Alma-Seidler-Ring was donated for the Kammerschauspielerin. An Alma-Seidler-Weg in Liesing and a street in Leoben was named after her.

== Roles ==
- Angélique in: Der eingebildete Kranke by Molière, 1922;
- Franziska in: Minna von Barnhelm by G. E. Lessing, 1926;
- Title role in: Käthchen von Heilbronn by H. v. Kleist, 1927;
- Susie Sachs in: Arm wie eine Kirchenmaus by L. Fodor, 1928;
- Viktoria in: Mädchenjahre einer Königin by Sil-Vara (Geza Silberer), 1932;
- Susi Peschta in: Das Kamel geht durch das Nadelöhr by F. Langer, 1934;
- Anna Meinhold-Aigner, in: Das weite Land by A. Schnitzler, 1959;
- Die Mutter, in: Sechs Personen suchen einen Autor by L. Pirandello, 1959;
- Title role, in: Die Irre von Chaillot by J. Giraudoux, 1961;
- Mathilde von Zahnd, in: Die Physiker by F. Dürrenmatt, 1963;
- Gunhild, in: John Gabriel Borkman by H. Ibsen, 1964;
- Martha, in: Arsen und Spitzenhäubchen by J. Kesselring, 1965;
- Aase, in: Peer Gynt by H. Ibsen, 1965;
- Claire Zachanassian, in: Der Besuch der alten Dame by F. Dürrenmatt, 1970;
- Die alte Margret, in: Der Vater by A. Strindberg, 1973;
- Signora Frola, in: So ist es – ist es so? by L. Pirandello, 1974;
- Daja, in: Nathan der Weise by G. E. Lessing, 1974;

== Selected filmography ==
- Arlberg Express (1948)
- The Angel with the Trumpet (1948)
- White Gold (1949)
- Vagabonds (1949)
- Cordula (1950)
- The Fourth Commandment (1950)
- Voices of Spring (1952)
- To Be Without Worries (1953)
- Mozart (1955)
- Three Men in the Snow (1955)
- Scandal in Bad Ischl (1957)
- The Saint and Her Fool (1957)
- The Unexcused Hour (1957)
- One Should Be Twenty Again (1958)
- Jedermann (1961)
- The Adventures of Count Bobby (1961)
- Der Spinnenmörder (1978, TV film)
