= The Return of A. J. Raffles =

1975 play by Graham Greene

- Written by: Graham Greene
- Genre: Comedy
- Setting: An Albany apartment and a country house in 1900

Premiere
- Date: 4 December 1975
- Place: Aldwych Theatre

The Return of A. J. Raffles, first produced and published in 1975, is an Edwardian comedy play in three acts, written by Graham Greene and based somewhat loosely on E. W. Hornung's characters in The Amateur Cracksman. Set in the late summer of the year 1900, the story revolves around the infamous burglar and cricketer, A. J. Raffles—presumed dead in the Boer War—who returns to Albany where, with his friends Bunny and Lord Alfred Douglas, he plots to rob the Marquess of Queensberry, partly for the money and partly for revenge against the Marquess for his treatment of their friend Oscar Wilde. The robbery takes place at the Marquess' house in Hertfordshire, where Raffles and Bunny are interrupted by the Prince of Wales and a Scotland Yard detective, who discover the Prince's personal letters have also been stolen.

== Plot ==
=== Act I ===
The play starts on a date in late summer 1900, in A. J. Raffles's old Albany chambers in Piccadilly. Lord Alfred Douglas comes to see his friend Bunny Manders, who served a prison sentence for burglary and met Oscar Wilde in Reading Gaol. Bunny is wearing a black armband in memory of Raffles, who was reportedly killed in the Boer War six months prior. Bunny and Raffles had a homosexual relationship, and Bunny tells Lord Alfred he is still always faithful to Raffles. Raffles left a will leaving Bunny everything, including the Albany chambers. Bunny shows Lord Alfred some of Raffles's burglary tools. The Albany head porter, Smith, says a man in tweeds with a grey beard wants to see Bunny. Bunny recognizes the man as Inspector Mackenzie, the police detective who arrested Bunny and tried to arrest Raffles. Mackenzie questions Bunny about the tools, and Bunny comes up with innocent explanations for them.

After Mackenzie leaves the room, Lord Alfred suggests to Bunny that they steal from Lord Alfred's father, the Marquess of Queensberry, as a way of getting revenge for Wilde's prison sentence. Bunny is unwilling to do it without Raffles. Suddenly, Raffles enters, revealing that he was disguised as Mackenzie. He explains that on the battlefield, he exchanged papers with a dead soldier before he was captured by the Boers. He escaped, with a gold pocket watch owned by General Botha. After leaving the room, Raffles had eavesdropped on Bunny and Lord Alfred, because he was jealous after finding Bunny and Lord Alfred together. He heard Lord Alfred's burglary idea and approves of it. Bunny is delighted to be reunited with Raffles and removes his armband. They plan for Raffles to rob the Marquess's safe during a baccarat house party. Raffles asks Lord Alfred for a list of the guests and a floor plan of the house. Lord Alfred points out the safe in his father's bedroom.

=== Act II ===
The second act takes place a few nights later, in the Marquess of Queensberry's bedroom in his country house in Hertfordshire. After a waiter brings champagne to the room, Bunny and Raffles sneak in. Raffles uses one of his safe-keys to open the old safe. He fills a nearby gold box with sovereigns, and has Bunny put the letters that were in the box into his pockets. Raffles then gives Bunny the box to put under his cloak, and starts filling his own pockets with coins. They hear noises. Raffles closes the safe and hides with Bunny on the balcony behind the curtain. A lady, Alice, enters the room, followed by her lady's maid, Mary, who helps her mistress change into a dressing gown and also hints that she has romantic feelings for her mistress. The lady goes to another room to have a bath and Mary leaves. Raffles tells Bunny to bring the box to Albany, which Bunny does though he hesitates to leave Raffles. Raffles plans to steal from the baccarat players.

The Prince of Wales comes looking for Alice, with whom he is having an affair. The Marquess had lent Alice the room, which Lord Alfred didn't know. Raffles pretends to be a waiter named Jones. The Prince asks to be called Mr. Portland. Raffles mentions that he was wounded and captured at Spion Kop, which impresses the Prince. Raffles gives him the pocket watch and tells him to give it to his mother. The Marquess of Queensberry comes saying there is a Scotland Yard inspector downstairs, and realizes his safe was robbed. The real Inspector Mackenzie appears, having come because a German agent is trying to acquire the Prince's indiscreet letters to Alice, which she kept in a gold cigar box. Mackenzie recognizes Raffles and arrests him for robbing the safe, but Raffles proposes a deal, offering to find the letters and the German agent. He realizes the agent is the waiter who brought champagne. Alice returns and wonders why there are so many people in the room.

=== Act III ===
In Raffles's chambers in Albany, early the next morning, Bunny tells Lord Alfred that Raffles has been caught and that the police are probably looking for Bunny too. Bunny gives the money in the box to Lord Alfred. The waiter from before enters. He is Captain von Blixen, a German agent. He believes Bunny is a rival Russian agent and wants the letters. Bunny dropped most of them on the street while bicycling away, but he gives what he has to the agent, who is armed with a revolver. Captain von Blixen is disappointed to see these letters are dull. The Prince comes and tells the agent to put his gun down. There is a sound of broken glass. Raffles, Mackenzie, and the Marquess had gone to the roof to cut off a possible escape route for the German agent. Raffles reports that the Marquess fell through the roof into the Burlington Arcade. Raffles takes the agent's gun and gets him to agree not to search for the letters by making him undress to his combinations.

Mackenzie and Lord Alfred carry in the apparently dead Marquess. Lord Alfred, who despises his father, is pleased. Mackenzie tries to arrest Raffles for burglary, but the Prince refuses to charge Raffles with stealing the box and Lord Alfred claims that Raffles was only obtaining the allowance he was owed. Mackenzie exits. Lord Alfred leaves to go to Paris and possibly see Wilde. The Prince is not concerned about the lost letters, because the names in the letters are common. Raffles promises the Prince that from now on, he will only be known to England as a cricketer, not a burglar. The Prince, grateful for the pocket watch, gives Raffles the gold box. The Prince leaves. Raffles tells Bunny his promise would not prevent them from being burglars while spending the winter in France. Smith and Captain von Blixen start to carry the Marquess out when the Marquess suddenly sits up, alarmed. Raffles casually tells him they are simply taking him to the hospital.

== Roles and original cast ==
The following is a list of the roles in the play, and the actors who portrayed the characters in the 1975 premiere.

- A. J. Raffles – Denholm Elliott
- Bunny – Clive Francis
- Lord Alfred Douglas – Peter Blythe
- Mr Portland (Prince of Wales) – Paul Rogers
- Inspector Mackenzie – Raymond Westwell
- The Marquess of Queensberry – Norman Tyrrell
- A Lady Called Alice – Jane How
- A Lady's Maid Called Mary – Jane Cussons
- Mr Smith, Head Porter of Albany – Gordon Gostelow
- Captain von Blixen – Michael Bryant

== Background ==
In a Kaleidoscope radio interview published in The Listener magazine on the day of the play's 1975 premiere, Graham Greene explained that he was inspired to write the play by his enjoyment of the Raffles stories in his youth, and by a Royal Shakespeare Company production of the play Sherlock Holmes. Greene said that "Raffles and Bunny were, in a sense, the reverse side of the medal of Sherlock Holmes and Watson. That gave me the idea of doing a play on these two characters."

In the same interview, Greene said of the play, "This is not an adventure of Raffles which Hornung wrote. Hornung finished by destroying Raffles—he was killed in the South African war. I've brought him back from the South African war, and this is an additional adventure, as it were. I've brought out what I consider the latent homosexuality in the characters of Bunny and Raffles. I've done it only slightly—I mean it's not by any means a homosexual play. Bunny had been imprisoned with Oscar Wilde for a quite different offence, and so I've introduced Lord Alfred Douglas and the Marquis of Queensberry, and also the Prince of Wales, whom I've always found a very sympathetic character." Regarding the Prince of Wales, Greene said, "I have the feeling that there would never have been the war of 1914 if he had lived. I think recent documents—the correspondence with the Portuguese ambassador, wasn't it?—show him as much more taking a line in politics than one had realised before."

Greene precedes the published version of the play with an author's note, which explains the story cannot of course be accepted as strictly true to history:

I have in one respect seriously deviated from the truth – the Marquess of Queensberry met his end in January 1900 and I have extended his life into the late summer of that year.... On the other hand the gold box presented by the theatrical profession to the Prince of Wales is in no way fictitious.... And I am prepared to defend the truth of Raffles' return from South Africa alive. His chronicler, and his close companion, Bunny, wrote a moving account of Raffles' death and claimed to have been beside him when he was 'killed', but Bunny had every reason for falsifying history, to disguise the fact that, far from being in South Africa, he was, at the date of Spion Kop, incarcerated in Reading Gaol, where he had the good fortune to meet Oscar Wilde.

== Productions ==
Denholm Mitchell Elliott starred as Raffles in the London premiere of the play at the Aldwych Theatre. It opened on 4 December 1975 and was produced by the Royal Shakespeare Company. The director was David Jones, the light designer was Stewart Leviton, the designer was Alan Tagg, and the music was by Guy Woolfenden. The production was also presented at the Royal Shakespeare Theatre from 13 to 17 January 1976.

The play was presented in Canada at the Theatre New Brunswick in 1979 with John Neville as Raffles and David Renton as Bunny. Jeremy Child portrayed Raffles in a production at the Oxford Playhouse that opened in October 1979. Brian Protheroe appeared as Raffles with Adrian Ross-Magenty as Bunny in a 1994 production at the Watford Palace Theatre.

== Reception ==
Martin Esslin wrote a positive review of the play's original Aldwych Theatre production and commented that Denholm Elliott was "brilliantly cast" as Raffles, while Benedict Nightingale was critical of Elliott's performance and the play's dialogue.

In his 1999 book Raffles and His Creator, Peter Rowland wrote regarding the play that "the dialogue crackles with life and the changes are rung in a dazzling fashion which Hornung himself couldn't have bettered", and added that "Greene had produced a little gem of a play and one which ought, ideally, to be admitted to the official canon."

== Radio adaptation ==
A radio dramatisation of the play aired on 17 January 1993 on the BBC World Service, as part of the BBC radio series Raffles. In the adaptation of the play, Jeremy Clyde played Raffles and Michael Cochrane played Bunny Manders. Clyde and Cochrane had previously portrayed Raffles and Bunny respectively in the Raffles radio series on BBC Radio 4 from 1985 to 1992. The radio adaptation features the following cast:

- A. J. Raffles – Jeremy Clyde
- Bunny – Michael Cochrane
- Lord Alfred Douglas – David Timson
- Mr Portland (Prince of Wales) – Edward de Souza
- Inspector Mackenzie – Henry Stamper
- The Marquess of Queensberry – David March
- A Lady Called Alice – Alice Arnold
- A Lady's Maid Called Mary – Melanie Hudson
- Mr Smith, Head Porter of Albany – Gordon Reid
- Captain von Blixen – Sean Baker
