= Anita Gutwell =

Austrian actress (1931–2022)

- Born: 14 November 1931; Klagenfurt, Carinthia, Austria
- Died: 5 January 2022 (aged 90); Vienna, Austria
- Occupation: Actress
- Years active: 1954–1964

Anita Gutwell (later Nussgruber, 14 November 1931 – 5 January 2022) was an Austrian actress who was a leading lady in 1950s classic films.

== Personal life and death ==
She was married to director Rudolf Nussgruber until his death in 2001. Gutwell died in Vienna on 5 January 2022, at the age of 90.

== Selected filmography ==
- The Forester of the Silver Wood (1954)
- The Dairymaid of St. Kathrein (1955)
- The Old Forester House (1956)
- Forest Liesel (1956)
- The Poacher of the Silver Wood (1957)
- Sebastian Kneipp (1958)
- Munchhausen in Africa (1958)
- Hohe Tannen (1960)
- Das Riesenrad (1961)
- Freud: The Secret Passion (1962)
