= Charles and Diana: Unhappily Ever After =

1992 television film directed by John Power

- Directed by: John Power
- Screenplay by: Nancy Sackett
- Based on: the breakdown of the royal marriage
- Produced by: Nick Gillott
- Starring: Catherine Oxenberg; Roger Rees; Jane How
- Cinematography: Alan Doberman
- Edited by: Tod Feuerman
- Music by: James McVay; Lennie Moore
- Production company: Konigsberg-Sanitsky Productions
- Distributed by: ABC
- Release date: 13 December 1992
- Running time: 95 minutes
- Countries: United States/Canada; Made on location in England and Scotland
- Language: English

Charles and Diana: Unhappily Ever After is a 1992 American made-for-television biographical drama film telling the real-life story of the failed marriage of Charles, Prince of Wales, and his first wife, Diana, Princess of Wales.

Directed by John Power and released in December 1992, the film stars Catherine Oxenberg as Diana, Roger Rees as Charles, and Jane How as Camilla Parker Bowles.

The film was released on DVD in November 2004. One issue of it was retitled Charles & Diana: A Palace Divided.

== Background and production ==
The film followed the fallout of revelations about the Prince and Princess of Wales's deteriorating relationship published in May 1992 in Andrew Morton's book Diana: Her True Story. The executive producers were Frank Konigsberg and Larry Sanitsky, who had previously worked together on Surviving: A Family in Crisis (1985) and Act of Vengeance (1986). They went on to produce Oldest Living Confederate Widow Tells All (1994) and Titanic (1996) together.

Oxenberg, who played Diana, is a daughter of Princess Elizabeth of Yugoslavia and a third cousin of Charles. She had played the part of Diana once before, in The Royal Romance of Charles and Diana (1982).

Oxenberg commented on playing Diana again:

"Diana's life has changed so much since her marriage it was like playing another person. There's so much more information about her now. The character I played the first time was quite one-dimensional, the fantasy of a young girl falling in love with a prince. There was no emotional or psychological drama or struggle or anything. It was what it was. This new film has a lot of levels, dimensions and textures. It's more human."

Gladys Crosbie reprised the role of Queen Elizabeth the Queen Mother from Britannia Hospital (1982), and was considered to be a "dead ringer" for her.

ABC's first airing of the film on American television was on 13 December 1992, and was well-timed, coming four days after British prime minister John Major had announced in the House of Commons the "amicable separation" of Charles and Diana.

== Synopsis ==
The film begins in the early days of the marriage of Charles and Diana, when they appear to be fond of each other and even in love. However, early scenes show them to have very different characters and interests. Charles is shown as intellectual and fastidious, a lover of opera, whereas Diana wants romance and is bored by opera. Also, the spectre of Charles's former mistress Camilla Parker Bowles intrudes into the marriage from the beginning. Within two months of their wedding, Diana accuses Charles to his face of being in love with Camilla. A series of tribulations and infidelities is eventually shared with the world through newspaper reports. The couple ends up estranged and indifferent to each other, but still connected through two young sons, William, now aged ten, and Harry, eight.

== Cast ==
- Catherine Oxenberg as Diana, Princess of Wales
- Roger Rees as Charles, Prince of Wales
- Jane How as Camilla Parker Bowles
- Amanda Walker as Queen Elizabeth II
- David Quilter as Prince Philip, Duke of Edinburgh
- Benedict Taylor as Prince Andrew, Duke of York
- Tracy Brabin as Sarah, Duchess of York
- Gladys Crosbie as Queen Elizabeth the Queen Mother
- Cate Fowler as Princess Anne
- Alan Manson as Mark Phillips
- Ernest Blake as Robert Fellowes, Baron Fellowes
- Charles Collingwood as Martin
- Thomas Szekeres as Prince William
- Oliver Stone as Prince Harry
- Mark Aiken as Nick
- Christopher Owen as Doctor
- David Glover as Director of Clinic
- Patrick Pearson as Palmer
- Ron Peterson as Palace Chef
- Charles Jamieson as Builder
- Keith Hutcheon as Hairdresser
- Jeffrey Daunton as Footman
- Richard Hampton as Architect
- Aline Hay as Hostess
- Vivienne Dixon as House Guest

== Reception ==
Variety found the film "good-looking but unsatisfying" and commented that the fractured relationship of Charles and Diana was "punctuated by moments so melodramatic they would make Barbara Cartland groan". It considered that Rees had failed to convey Charles' eccentricity and that Oxenberg's Diana was too constantly about to snap, lacking Diana's earlier girlishness and her later elegance.
