= Hermann Erhardt =

German actor (1903–1958)

Hermann Erhardt (January 9, 1903 in Landshut - November 30, 1958 in Vienna) was a German actor who played in more than 50 movies, among them Heimkehr and A Devil of a Woman.

== Selected filmography ==
- The Monastery's Hunter (1935)
- Marriage Strike (1935)
- The Cabbie's Song (1936)
- Women's Regiment (1936)
- Der Etappenhase (1937)
- Love is Duty Free (1941)
- Whom the Gods Love (1942)
- Der Hofrat Geiger (1947)
- The Queen of the Landstrasse (1948)
- Ulli and Marei (1948)
- The Angel with the Trumpet (1948)
- White Gold (1949)
- Lambert Feels Threatened (1949)
- Vagabonds (1949)
- Cordula (1950)
- Bonus on Death (1950)
- Call Over the Air (1951)
- White Shadows (1951)
- Adventure in Vienna (1952)
- Vanished Melody (1952)
- Anna Louise and Anton (1953)
- Daughter of the Regiment (1953)
- The Forester of the Silver Wood (1954)
- You Can No Longer Remain Silent (1955)
- Espionage (1955)
- Ich suche Dich (1956)
