= The Thief of Venice =

- Directed by: John Brahm
- Written by: Jesse Lasky Jr. uncredited John Brahm; Salvatore Cabasino
- Based on: story by Michael Pertwee
- Produced by: Robert Haggiag; Dario Sabatello
- Starring: Maria Montez; Paul Christian; Massimo Serato; Faye Marlow; Aldo Silvani
- Cinematography: Anchise Brizzi
- Edited by: Renzo Lucidi; Terry Morse
- Music by: Alessandro Cicognini
- Production company: Sparta Films
- Distributed by: 20th Century-Fox (US)
- Release dates: 1950 (Italy); November 1952 (US)
- Running time: 91 minutes
- Countries: Italy; United States
- Languages: Italian; English
- Budget: $3 million
- Box office: 1,745,680 admissions (France)

The Thief of Venice or Il Ladro di Venezia is a 1950 Italian film directed by John Brahm. The US title was "The Thief of Venice".

It was released in the US two years after being made.

== Plot ==
In 1575 Venice, the Doge has just died and Scarpa the Grand Inquisitor leads a plot to seize control of Venice.

Disani, a popular admiral works to stop the Grand Inquisitor's power grab with the help of Lorenzo, one of his officers. They manage to get back to Venice in record time by promising the galley slaves their freedom. When they arrive back Disani is killed and Lorenzo goes into hiding.

Lorenzo continues the fight against Scarpa, who plans to marry Disani's daughter Francesca. Lorenzo and Francesca fall in love even though Lorenzo is also loved by tavern girl Tina.

Lorenzo's rebellion against Scarpa is successful.

== Cast ==
- Maria Montez as Tina
- Paul Christian as Alfiere Lorenzo Contarini
- Massimo Serato as Scarpa the Inquisitor
- Faye Marlowe as Francesca Disani
- Aldo Silvani as Capt. von Sturm
- Luigi Saltamerenda ... Alfredo
- Guido Celano ... Polo
- Umberto Sacripante ... Durro
- Camillo Pilotto ... Adm. Disani
- Ferdinando Tamberlani... Lombardi
- Liana Del Balzo ... Duenna
- Paolo Stoppa ... Marco
- Mario Tosi ... Mario
- Vinicio Sofia ... Grazzi
- Leonardo Scavino ... Sharp Eye

== Production ==
The movie was an Italian-American co production. It was announced in March 1949 with Gordon Griffith to be the original producer and Jess Lasky Jr. to be associate producer. Filming was to begin June 1 and Jacques Tourneur was intended to direct.

In June it was thought Edmond O'Brien and his wife Olga San Juan would star and the producers would be Monte Schaff and Lou Appleton. Douglas Fairbanks Jr. was also mentioned as a possible lead and Nat Waschburger was going to be the European producer. Olive Deering was mentioned as a possible female lead.

Eventually in August it was announced Nathan Wachsberger would produce (in Europe) from a script by Jesse Lasky Jr., and that former Universal contract stars Maria Montez and Paul Christian would star. Christian had just made Bagdad with Maureen O'Hara.

John Brahm signed to direct and Faye Marlowe and George Sanders were to play support roles, with filming to start in Italy on 1 November 1949. (Brahm had worked with both at 20th Century Fox.) Sanders eventually pulled out.

=== Shooting ===
Filming started November 1949 and went until February. Then it resumed in June. The movie was shot on location in Italy with studio work done at Scalera Studios. Filming finished by March 1950.

== Reception ==
=== Critical ===
The New York Times called it "mammoth, picturesque and infantile" which "represents the lustiest barrage of screen hokum in a blue moon. Principally because of the unabashed muscularity of the action and a stunning authenticity of background this production... remains for the most part palatable fun to watch."

The Christian Science Monitor said that "a series of coups, captures and escapes take place with a great deal of running about but very little inventiveness."

The Washington Post called it "a rip snorting Western" style film.

Jean Pierre Aumont, Montez's husband, liked Brahm's direction so much that he wanted him to direct Aumont in a film called The Bumbler.
