= I'm Marrying the Director =

1960 film

- Directed by: Wolfgang Liebeneiner
- Written by: Heinrich Krackhardt (novel); Wolfgang Liebeneiner
- Produced by: Richard Deutsch; Alf Teichs
- Starring: Heidelinde Weis; Gerhard Riedmann; Hans Söhnker
- Cinematography: Walter Partsch
- Edited by: Hilde Gutsche; Ursula Norkus
- Music by: Heinz Neubrand
- Production companies: Österreichische Film; Schönbrunn-Film
- Distributed by: Deutsche Film Hansa
- Release date: 5 February 1960
- Running time: 99 minutes
- Country: Austria
- Language: German

I'm Marrying the Director (German: Ich heirate Herrn Direktor) is a 1960 Austrian comedy film directed by Wolfgang Liebeneiner and starring Heidelinde Weis, Gerhard Riedmann and Hans Söhnker.

It was shot at the Schönbrunn Studios in Vienna. The film's sets were designed by the art directors Fritz Moegle and Heinz Ockermüller.

== Synopsis ==
An ambitious young stenographer decides she is going to marry the director of her company, and sets out to woo him. However, she eventually meets a man of her own age and realises there is more to life than money.

== Cast ==
- Heidelinde Weis as Brigitte
- Gerhard Riedmann as Franz Bogner
- Hans Söhnker as Direktor Georg Stahlmann
- Katharina Mayberg as Silvia Roscol
- Susi Nicoletti as Frau von Wittekind
- Senta Berger as Vera Bleichinger
- Adrienne Gessner as Luise Stahlmann
- Wolfgang Jansen as Peter Drill
- Fritz Muliar as Jahn
- Dorothea Neff as Frau Mahnke
- Fritz Hinz-Fabricius as Roscol
- Anton Mitterwurzer as Arthur Stahlmann
- Vera Balser-Eberle as Fräulein Schickedanz
- Franz Eichberger as Polizist
- Walter Lehr as Polizist
- Walter Regelsberger as Fahrer der Funkstreife
- Raoul Retzer as Kellner im Hotel
- Rudolf Strobl as Kommissar
- Gustav Knuth as Friedrich Kiesberg
- Hannelore Auer as Hannelore Auer
- Karl Farkas as Dr. Spunder

== Bibliography ==
- Bock, Hans-Michael & Bergfelder, Tim. The Concise CineGraph. Encyclopedia of German Cinema. Berghahn Books, 2009.
