= The Poacher of the Silver Wood =

1957 film

- Directed by: Otto Meyer
- Written by: Ernst Welisch; Ilse von Gasteiger
- Produced by: Ernest Müller; Robert Siepen
- Starring: Anita Gutwell; Rudolf Lenz; Rudolf Carl
- Cinematography: Walter Partsch
- Edited by: Heinz Haber
- Music by: Hans Hagen; Karl Götz
- Production company: Rex-Film
- Distributed by: Union-Film
- Release date: 10 October 1957
- Running time: 93 minutes
- Country: West Germany
- Language: German

The Poacher of the Silver Wood (German: Der Wilderer vom Silberwald) is a 1957 West German drama film directed by Otto Meyer and starring Rudolf Lenz, Anita Gutwell and Rudolf Carl. It was one of several films made to follow up the success of the 1954 heimatfilm The Forester of the Silver Wood.

It was shot on location in the Alpine state of Salzburg.

== Cast ==
- Rudolf Lenz as Christian Pachegg
- Anita Gutwell as Ulli
- Rudolf Carl as Mathias Hoellrigl
- Lucie Englisch as Mathilde Hoellrigl
- Traute Wassler as Josefa Rohrer
- Brigitte Antonius
- Emmerich Schrenk
- Fritz Muliar
- Wolfgang Jansen
- Harry Kratz
- Walter Varndal
- Heinrich Fuchs
- Ludwig Geiger
- Vera Complojer
- Carl Esmond

== Bibliography ==
- Baer, Hester. Dismantling the Dream Factory: Gender, German Cinema, and the Postwar Quest for a New Film Language. Berghahn Books, 2012.
