= White Gold (1949 film) =

1949 film

- Directed by: Eduard von Borsody
- Written by: Alexander Lix; Eduard von Borsody
- Starring: Heinrich Gretler; Alma Seidler; Robert Freitag
- Cinematography: Walter Riml
- Edited by: Ira Oberberg
- Music by: Alois Melichar
- Production company: Österreichische Film GmbH
- Distributed by: Sascha Filmverleih; Deutsche London Film (Germany)
- Release date: 11 March 1949
- Running time: 89 minutes
- Country: Austria
- Language: German

White Gold (German: Weißes Gold) is a 1949 Austrian drama film directed by Eduard von Borsody, and starring Heinrich Gretler, Alma Seidler and Robert Freitag.

The film's art direction was by Julius von Borsody.

== Cast ==
- Heinrich Gretler as Vergeiner
- Alma Seidler as Vergeinerin
- Robert Freitag as Andreas, deren Sohn
- Armin Dahlen as Konrad, deren Sohn
- Angela Salloker as Angela, dessen Tochter
- Ursula Lingen as Maggie, Konstruktionszeichnerin
- Rolf von Nauckhoff as Ing. Hopkins
- Hermann Erhardt as Atzelbauer
- Karl Günther as Generaldirektor Urban
- Geschwister Schmid as Singers
- Oskar Hugelmann as Bürgermeister
- Josef Krastel
- Walter Ladengast as Schneider-Sepp
- Tonia Nitroff as Müller-Marie
- Hugo Riedl as Pfarrer
- Anneliese Tausz as Kathi, deren Tochter
- Ena Valduga as Bärnhoferin

== Bibliography ==
- Fritsche, Maria. Homemade Men in Postwar Austrian Cinema: Nationhood, Genre and Masculinity. Berghahn Books, 2013.
