= Eva Renzi =

German actress (1944–2005)

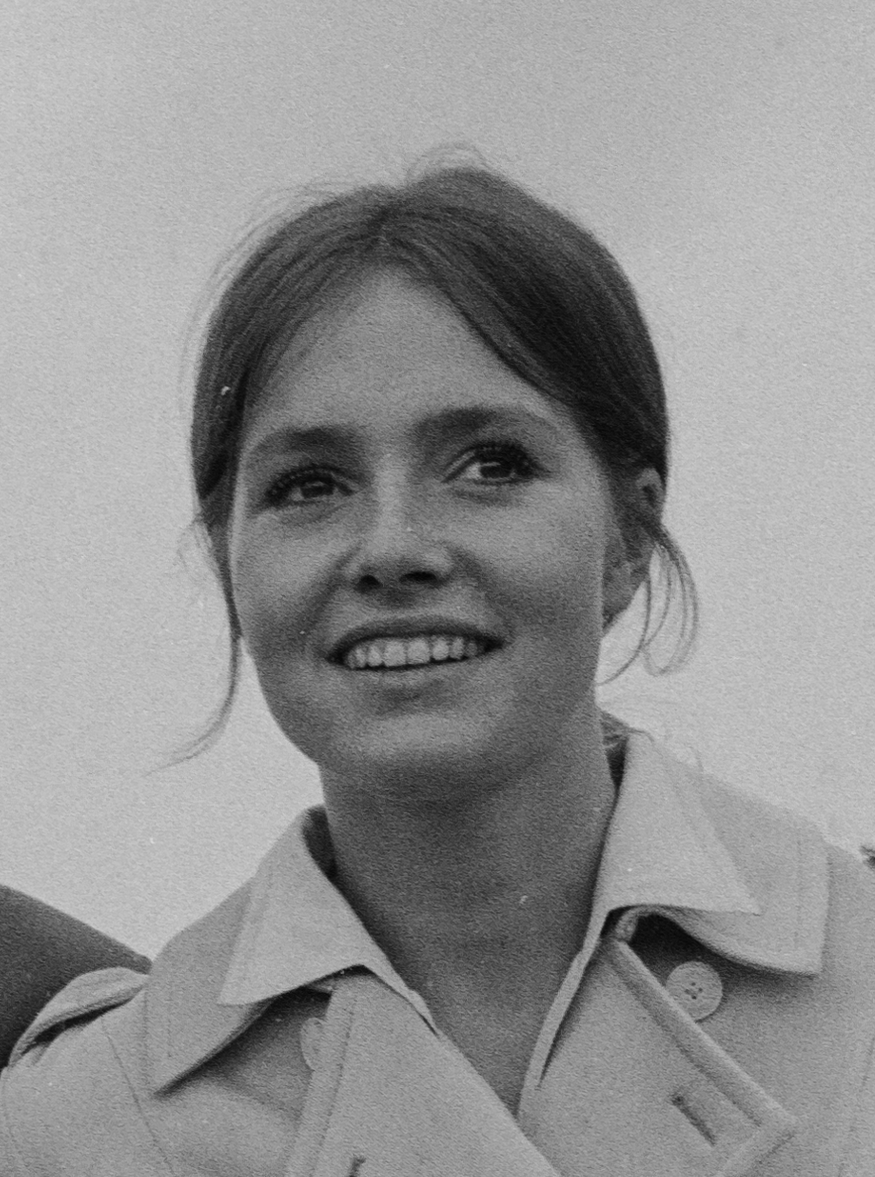
- Renzi in 1968
- Born: Evelyn Renziehausen; 3 November 1944; Berlin, German Reich
- Died: 16 August 2005 (aged 60); Berlin, Germany
- Occupation: Actress
- Years active: 1966–2005
- Height: 5 ft 10 in (178 cm)
- Spouse: Paul Hubschmid (m. 1967; div. 1980)
- Children: Anouschka Renzi

Eva Renzi (born Evelyn Renziehausen; 3 November 1944 – 16 August 2005) was a German actress.

== Biography ==
Born in Berlin to a Danish father and a French mother, she enrolled in the Berlin Actors' Studio at age 16 and began appearing in plays in Germany. For eight months she played a maid in the German translation of Noël Coward's Dinner at Eight. She was married briefly and gave birth to her daughter Anouschka; when the marriage ended, she began a modelling career to support herself and her daughter. After modelling clothing in German magazines and newspapers, she was introduced to film audiences in Will Tremper's That Woman (1966) and made her international debut the same year in the British film Funeral in Berlin, the second Harry Palmer film, as Israeli agent Samantha Steel, appearing with Michael Caine.

Renzi was offered a leading role in the next planned James Bond film, You Only Live Twice, but she declined the role, commenting in an interview in Newark Evening News that "Bond pictures are good for pretty girls but not for actresses. I would rather sell shoes." She turned down other roles, including an offer by director Orson Welles, due to her husband's jealousy. When she and Hubschmid began their separation, eventually leading to divorce, her career stagnated further.

She later featured with James Garner in The Pink Jungle (1968) as Alison Duquesne, and in the giallo thriller The Bird with the Crystal Plumage (1970) as Monica Ranieri.

In 1973, Renzi caused a sensation in the tabloid press by taking a months-long trip to India and becoming involved with the Rajneesh movement, which she later left, accusing the leader, Bhagwan Shree Rajneesh, of fascist tendencies and abusing drugs.

Renzi continued acting on stage after her film career had largely ended. In 1983, she was dismissed from the Bad Hersfelder Festspiele, a theater festival, for referring to President Karl Carstens, who had joined the Brownshirts in 1934, as an "old Nazi". In 2002, she staged a comeback in the play Amanda, which featured a monologue of a woman who emancipates herself after the death of her husband.

=== Personal life ===
From 1967 until 1980, she was married to Swiss actor Paul Hubschmid with whom she appeared in several films. She was the mother of actress Anouschka Renzi.

== Death ==
On 16 August 2005 Renzi died of lung cancer at the age of 60 in Berlin. She was buried at Luisenfriedhof III.

== Filmography ==
- Playgirl (1966, by Will Tremper) - Alexandra Borowski
- Funeral in Berlin (1966, by Guy Hamilton) - Samantha Steel
- Le Grand Dadais (1967, by Pierre Granier-Deferre) - Patricia
- Negresco (1968, by Klaus Lemke) - cameo
- The Pink Jungle (1968, by Delbert Mann) - Alison Duguesne
- A Woman Needs Loving (1969, by Robert Azderball) - Jane
- Taste of Excitement (1970, by Don Sharp) - Jane Kerrell
- The Bird with the Crystal Plumage (1970, by Dario Argento) - Monica Ranieri
- Rendezvous with Dishonour (1970, by Adriano Bolzoni) - Helena
- Love, Vampire Style (1970, by Helmut Förnbacher) - Sabrina von der Wies
- Death Occurred Last Night (1970, by Duccio Tessari) - Lamberti's wife
- Tatort (1971, Episode: "Kressin und der tote Mann im Fleet") - Tatjana
- Primus (1971–1972, TV Series, 26 episodes) - Toni Hayden
- Das Messer (1971, TV Mini-Series) - Julie Andrew
- Das Blaue Palais (1976, TV Mini-Series, 2 episodes) - Eva
- La Fille prodigue (1981, by Jacques Doillon) - La fiancée
- Manuel (1986) - Manuel's Mother
- Friedenspolka (1987, TV film) - Elke Holst
