= Carry On Follow That Camel =

1967 British comedy film by Gerald Thomas

Follow That Camel
- Original UK quad poster by Renato Fratini
- Directed by: Gerald Thomas
- Written by: Talbot Rothwell
- Produced by: Peter Rogers
- Starring: Phil Silvers; Kenneth Williams; Jim Dale; Charles Hawtrey; Joan Sims; Angela Douglas; Peter Butterworth; Bernard Bresslaw; Anita Harris
- Cinematography: Alan Hume
- Edited by: Alfred Roome
- Music by: Eric Rogers
- Distributed by: Rank Organisation
- Release date: 14 December 1967
- Running time: 95 minutes
- Country: United Kingdom
- Language: English
- Budget: £288,366

Follow That Camel is a 1967 British comedy film directed by Gerald Thomas. It is the 14th in the series of 31 Carry On films (1958–1992). Like its predecessor Don't Lose Your Head, it was released without the words "Carry On" in its original title (though outside the United Kingdom it was known as Carry On In The Legion, and it is alternatively titled Carry On... Follow That Camel). It parodies the much-filmed 1924 book Beau Geste, by PC Wren, and other French Foreign Legion films.

This film was producer Peter Rogers's attempt to break into the American market; Phil Silvers (in his only Carry On) is heavily featured in a Sergeant Bilko-esque role. He appears alongside Carry On regulars Kenneth Williams, Jim Dale, Charles Hawtrey, Joan Sims, Peter Butterworth and Bernard Bresslaw. Angela Douglas makes the third of her four Carry On appearances, and Anita Harris makes the first of her two appearances. The film was followed by Carry On Doctor in 1967.

== Plot ==
His reputation brought into disrepute by Captain Bagshaw, a competitor for the affections of Lady Jane Ponsonby, Bertram Oliphant "Bo" West decides to leave England and join the French Foreign Legion, followed by his faithful manservant Simpson. Originally mistaken for enemy combatants at Sidi Bel Abbès, the pair eventually enlist and are helped in surviving Legion life by Sergeant Nocker, although only after they discover that when he is "on patrol" he is actually enjoying himself at the local cafe with the female owner, Zig-Zig.

Meanwhile, Lady Jane, having learnt that Bo was really innocent, heads out to the Sahara to bring him back to England. Along the way she has several encounters with men who exploit the fact that she is naive and travelling alone. After several such run-ins, including with the Legion fort's Commandant Burger (who coincidentally had once been her fencing instructor, and joined the Legion in self-imposed shame after he had inadvertently cut her finger during a lesson), she meets Sheikh Abdul Abulbul and ends up becoming a part of his harem and planned 13th wife.

Nocker and Bo are kidnapped by Abulbul after being lured to the home of Corktip, a belly dancer at the Café ZigZig. Simpson follows them to the Oasis El Nooki but is also captured. After entering Abulbul's harem and discovering Lady Jane, Bo and Simpson give themselves up while Nocker escapes (or rather is allowed to by Abulbul) back to Sidi Bel Abbes to warn Commandant Burger of Abulbul's plans to attack Fort Soixante-Neuf (i.e. 69, the sexual position). However, during this time Zig-Zig has told the Commandant about Nocker's true destination when on patrol, and therefore upon his return his story is not believed. It is only when Nocker mentions Lady Jane that they realise he was telling the truth and the Commandant organises a force to reinforce the fort.

Along the way they discover Bo and Simpson staked to the ground at the now abandoned oasis. The relief column marches on towards the fort but heat, lack of water and a sand castle building competition gone wrong decimates the force to a handful. The remaining members reach the fort to find that they are too late; the attack has already occurred and the garrison wiped out.

After learning that Abulbul's celebration of the successful attack includes marrying Lady Jane, Bo, Burger, Nocker and Simpson rescue her from his tent, leaving Simpson behind dressed as a decoy. When Abulbul discovers the deception, he chases Simpson back to the fort where, through the imaginative use of a gramophone and a German marching song, gum arabic, coconuts, gunpowder and a cricket bat, the group holds off Abulbul's army until a relief force arrives. However, Commandant Burger ends up as the sole casualty among the protagonists.

Back in England the group reunites for a game of cricket, with Nocker having been promoted to Commandant and Lady Jane having conceived a son by the late Burger. Bo is batting, but when he hits the ball, it explodes. The bowler is then shown to be Abulbul having gained his revenge, to which Bo, with a broken bat and burnt clothes, good-naturedly responds "Not out!"

== Filming ==
Location work was shot during the early months of 1967 when scenes set in the Sahara were filmed at Camber Sands near Rye, East Sussex, England. Shooting had to be halted several times because there was snow on the sands. Other shots occurred at Birkdale beach near Southport, Lancashire.

Some of the town sets were reused the year after in the production of Carry On Up the Khyber.

== Cast ==
- Phil Silvers as Sergeant Ernie Nocker
- Jim Dale as Bertram Oliphant "Bo" West
- Peter Butterworth as Simpson
- Kenneth Williams as Commandant Maximilian Burger
- Charles Hawtrey as Captain Le Pice
- Joan Sims as Zig-Zig
- Angela Douglas as Lady Jane Ponsonby
- Bernard Bresslaw as Sheikh Abdul Abulbul
- Anita Harris as Corktip
- John Bluthal as Corporal Clotski
- Peter Gilmore as Captain Bagshaw
- William Mervyn as Sir Cyril Ponsonby
- Julian Holloway as Ticket collector
- David Glover as Hotel manager
- Larry Taylor as Riff
- William Hurndell as Riff
- Julian Orchard as Doctor
- Vincent Ball as Ship's officer
- Peter Jesson as Lawrence (uncredited)
- Gertan Klauber as Spiv (uncredited)
- Michael Nightingale as Nightingale (uncredited)
- Richard Montez as Riff (uncredited)
- Frank Singuineau as Riff (uncredited)
- Simon Cain as Riff (uncredited)
- Harold Kasket as Hotel gentleman (uncredited)
- Edmund Pegge as Bowler (uncredited)
- Carol Sloane as Harem girl (uncredited)
- Gina Gianelli as Harem girl (uncredited)
- Dominique Don as Harem girl (uncredited)
- Anne Scott as Harem girl (uncredited)
- Patsy Snell as Harem girl (uncredited)
- Zorenah Osborne as Harem girl (uncredited)
- Margot Maxine as Harem girl (uncredited)
- Sally Douglas as Harem girl (uncredited)
- Angie Grant as Harem girl (uncredited)
- Gina Warwick as Harem girl (uncredited)
- Karen Young as Harem girl (uncredited)
- Helga Jones as Harem girl (uncredited)

== Crew ==
- Screenplay - Talbot Rothwell
- Music - Eric Rogers
- Production Manager - Jack Swinburne
- Director of Photography - Alan Hume
- Editor - Alfred Roome
- Art Director - Alex Vetchinsky
- Camera Operator - Alan Hall
- Assistant Director - David Bracknell
- Continuity - Joy Mercer
- Assistant Editor - Jack Gardner
- Make-up - Geoffrey Rodway
- Sound Recordists - Dudley Messenger & Ken Barker
- Hairdresser - Stella Rivers
- Costume Designer - Emma Selby-Walker
- Dubbing Editor - Wally Nelson
- Location Manager - Terry Clegg
- Producer - Peter Rogers
- Director - Gerald Thomas

== Dates and locations ==
- Filming dates – 1 May – 23 June 1967

Interiors:

- Pinewood Studios, Buckinghamshire

Exteriors:

- Rye and Camber Sands, Sussex
- Swakeleys House, Ickenham, Middlesex
- Osterley Park House, Isleworth, Middlesex

== Production notes ==
The character named "Corktip" is a parody of "Cigarette" in the 1936 film Under Two Flags, a film about the French Foreign Legion in the Sahara. The name refers to cigarettes, such as the Craven A brand, which had a cork tip.

Phil Silvers was paid £30,000 which was a great deal more than any other cast member, which provoked animosity among the regular Carry On team. Silvers also could not, or would not, learn his lines, so boards were placed behind the camera so he could read them as shooting was taking place. Despite Talbot Rothwell writing in January 1967 that the part "simply yells for Phil Silvers all the way along. I just can't get this Bilko image out of my mind", the central role of the fast-talking Foreign Legion Sergeant had originally been earmarked for Sid James. However, with a commitment to the ITV sitcom George and the Dragon, James's part was recast.

The song used by Bo and the others to trick Abdul into thinking there are reinforcements coming is "Heideröslein", a marching song made popular by German military and police units after World War II.

== Bibliography ==
- Davidson, Andy (2012). Carry On Confidential. London: Miwk. ISBN 978-1908630018.
- Sheridan, Simon (2011). Keeping the British End Up - Four Decades of Saucy Cinema. London: Titan Books. ISBN 978-0857682796.
- Webber, Richard (2009). 50 Years of Carry On. London: Arrow. ISBN 978-0099490074.
- Hudis, Norman (2008). No Laughing Matter. London: Apex. ISBN 978-1906358150.
- Keeping the British End Up: Four Decades of Saucy Cinema by Simon Sheridan (third edition) (2007) (Reynolds & Hearn Books)
- Ross, Robert (2002). The Carry On Companion. London: Batsford. ISBN 978-0713487718.
- Bright, Morris; Ross, Robert (2000). Mr Carry On - The Life & Work of Peter Rogers. London: BBC Books. ISBN 978-0563551836.
- Rigelsford, Adrian (1996). Carry On Laughing - a celebration. London: Virgin. ISBN 1-85227-554-5.
- Hibbin, Sally & Nina (1988). What a Carry On. London: Hamlyn. ISBN 978-0600558194.
- Eastaugh, Kenneth (1978). The Carry On Book. London: David & Charles. ISBN 978-0715374030.
