= Jane How =

British actress

- Born: Carolyn Jane Onslow How; 21 December 1950 (age 75); London, England
- Occupation: Actress
- Years active: 1972–present
- Spouses: Mark Burns (m. 1976; div. 1983) Richard Durden (m. 1996)
- Children: 1

Carolyn Jane Onslow How (born 21 December 1950) is an English actress with a range of television, film, and stage credits. She is best known for her role as Jan Hammond, the mistress of Den Watts in EastEnders. She appeared in the programme regularly from 1986 to 1987 and also made brief return appearances in 2002 and 2003, the latter leading up to Den's return to the show.

Other credits include Doctor Who story Planet of the Daleks (1973), The Spoils of War (1980-1981), A.D. (1985), Don't Wait Up (1983-1990), Charles and Diana: Unhappily Ever After (1992), AKA (2002), A Good Woman (2004), The Best Man (2005), Miss Potter (2006), 1st Night (2010), and Anatomy of a Scandal (2022).

== Early life ==
How was born in 1950, the youngest of three children of Major Robert Boothby How, an officer in the Black Watch, and his wife Virginia Ruth Primrose Hughes-Onslow, the only daughter of Oliver Hughes-Onslow, a barrister. Her parents divorced in 1953. After training at the Webber Douglas Academy of Dramatic Art, where she won the Rodney Millington Award, she spent several years in provincial theatre.

== Career ==
How's first screen credit came in 1973, in the Doctor Who story Planet of the Daleks. Other credits include two series of The Spoils of War (1980-1981), War and Remembrance, A.D. (1985), Anglo-Saxon Attitudes (1992), The Cazalet Chronicles, Zoya, playing another famous mistress, Camilla Parker Bowles, in the TV movie Charles and Diana: Unhappily Ever After (1992). How has also appeared in The Citadel, Midsomer Murders, Judge John Deed, Byron, Bad Girls, Love Soup, Armadillo, Agatha Christie's Poirot, Daniel Deronda, and as Helen alongside Nigel Havers in four series of the sitcom Don't Wait Up (1983-1990),, Love in a Cold Climate (2001), and Anatomy of a Scandal (2022).

Her films include AKA (2002), A Good Woman (2004), The Best Man (2005), Miss Potter (2006) and 1st Night (2010).

In the West End, she has appeared for the Royal Shakespeare Company in The Return of A. J. Raffles (1975-1976), as Larita in Noël Coward's Easy Virtue (1988-1989) at the Garrick, the original cast of Don't Dress for Dinner at the Apollo (1991-1997), Home and Beauty (2002-2003) at the Lyric, Top People at the Ambassadors Theatre, she played Lady Punnett in Half a Sixpence, which opened in the Noël Coward Theatre on 17 November 2016 and had its last performance on Saturday 2 September 2017 after 347 performances.

In 2009, How appeared as a finishing school teacher in a commercial for Go Compare insurance, while in March 2010 she appeared briefly as hospital executive Zara Merrick in the BBC1 drama series Casualty. In 2014, she played the role of Joan Rogerson in Fatal Attraction at the Theatre Royal Haymarket. In 2018, she played the role of Florence Boorman in Her Naked Skin at the Salisbury Playhouse.

== Personal life ==
In 1977, How married actor Mark Burns; they had a son, Jack, in 1981 and divorced in 1983. She later married actor Richard Durden, in 1996.

She has been chairwoman of the charity the Theatrical Guild since 2011, having been involved with the committee for many years.
