= Playgirl (1966 film) =

1966 film

- Directed by: Will Tremper
- Written by: Will Tremper
- Produced by: Felix Hock
- Starring: Eva Renzi; Harald Leipnitz; Paul Hubschmid
- Cinematography: Wolfgang Bellenbaum; Wolfgang Lührse
- Edited by: Ursula Möhrle
- Music by: Peter Thomas
- Production company: Will Tremper Filmproduktion
- Distributed by: Will Tremper Filmproduktion
- Release date: 23 June 1966
- Running time: 91 minutes
- Country: West Germany
- Language: German

Playgirl is a 1966 West German comedy drama film directed by Will Tremper and starring Eva Renzi, Harald Leipnitz and Paul Hubschmid. Extensive location shooting took place around West Berlin and it premiered at the city's Gloria-Palast. It is also known by the alternative title That Woman.

== Synopsis ==
Alexandra Borowski, a model working in Berlin who seeks out men who can advance her career. She wants to resume her relationship with the wealthy construction tycoon Joachim, but wary of her fickleness he instead sends his office manager Siegbert to brush her off. He falls in love with her and is ready to leave his fiancée to be with her, against the advice of Joachim.

== Cast ==
- Eva Renzi as Alexandra Borowski
- Harald Leipnitz as Siegbert 'Bert' Lahner
- Paul Hubschmid as Joachim Steigenwald
- Umberto Orsini as Timo
- Elga Stass as Hildchen Völker
- Rudolf Schündler as Doktorchen
- Narziss Sokatscheff as Bogdan
- Hans-Joachim Ketzlin as '007'
- Gero Gandert as Angestellter bei Steigenwald
- Heinz Zellermeyer as Hotelier
- Heinz Oestergaard as Modedesigner

== Bibliography ==
- Bock, Hans-Michael & Bergfelder, Tim. The Concise CineGraph. Encyclopedia of German Cinema. Berghahn Books, 2009.
- Rother, Rainer (ed.) German Film: From the Archives of the Deutsche Kinemathek. Hatje Cantz Verlag, 2024.
