= Ernest Müller =

Austrian film producer (1906–1962)

- Born: 10 March 1906; Vienna, Austro-Hungarian Empire
- Died: 8 May 1962 (aged 56); Spitz, Austria
- Occupation: Producer
- Years active: 1951–1962 (film)

Ernest Müller (1906–1962) was an Austrian film producer. He was active as producer in Austrian and West German cinema in the post-Second World War era as head of Schönbrunn-Film.

== Selected filmography ==
- The Fall of Valentin (1951)
- Wedding in the Hay (1951)
- If I Only Have Your Love (1953)
- Lavender (1953)
- The Dairymaid of St. Kathrein (1955)
- The Doctor's Secret (1955)
- Forest Liesel (1956)
- Engagement at Wolfgangsee (1956)
- The Poacher of the Silver Wood (1957)
- Candidates for Marriage (1958)
- The Street (1958)
- Hello Taxi (1958)
- Sebastian Kneipp (1958)
- My Daughter Patricia (1959)
- The Red Frenzy (1962)

== Bibliography ==
- Fritsche, Maria. Homemade Men In Postwar Austrian Cinema: Nationhood, Genre and Masculinity . Berghahn Books, 2013.
- Von Dassanowsky, Robert. Austrian Cinema: A History. McFarland, 2005.
