= Herbert B. Fredersdorf =

German film director and editor

- Born: 2 October 1899; Magdeburg; German Empire
- Died: 21 July 1971 (aged 71); Alicante; Spain
- Occupations: Film director Editor; Screenwriter
- Years active: 1932 - 1964

Herbert B. Fredersdorf (2 October 1899 – 21 July 1971) was a German film editor, screenwriter and film director.

== Selected filmography ==
=== Director ===
- Northern Lights (1938)
- Alarm (1941)
- Long Is the Road (1948)
- König Drosselbart (1954)
- Rumpelstilzchen (1955)
- The Dairymaid of St. Kathrein (1955)
- Der gestiefelte Kater (1955)
- Forest Liesel (1956)
- Kein Auskommen mit dem Einkommen! (1957)

=== Editor ===
- Montparnasse Girl (1932)
- Gypsies of the Night (1932)
- Night Convoy (1932)
- Laughing Heirs (1933)
- Happy Days in Aranjuez (1933)
- Young Dessau's Great Love (1933)
- Playing with Fire (1934)
- Count Woronzeff (1934)
- The Csardas Princess (1934)
- Make Me Happy (1935)
- The Foolish Virgin (1935)
- Under Blazing Heavens (1936)
- The Beggar Student (1936)
- Daphne and the Diplomat (1937)
- Between the Parents (1938)
- The Mystery of Betty Bonn (1938)
- Ursula Under Suspicion (1939)
- Die Erbin vom Rosenhof (1942)
- With the Eyes of a Woman (1942)
- Ball of Nations (1954)

=== Screenwriter ===
- The Fox of Paris (1957)

== Bibliography ==
- Shandley, Robert R. Rubble Films: German Cinema in the Shadow of the Third Reich. Temple University Press, 2001.
