= Elfe Gerhart =

Austrian actress (1919–2007)

- Born: 10 July 1919; Vienna, Austria
- Died: 9 November 2007 (aged 88); Grundlsee, Styria, Austria
- Occupation: Actress
- Years active: 1938–1944 (film & TV)

Elfe Gerhart (1919–2007) was an Austrian stage and film actress. She was married to the actor Paul Dahlke, and is sometimes known as Elfe Gerhart-Dahlke.

== Selected filmography ==
- Finale (1938)
- Konzert in Tirol (1938)
- Detours to Happiness (1939)
- Arlberg Express (1948)
- Vagabonds (1949)
- Mysterious Shadows (1949)
- Request Concert (1955)
- All the Sins of the Earth (1958)

== Bibliography ==
- Fritsche, Maria (2013). Homemade Men in Postwar Austrian Cinema. New York: Berghahn Books. ISBN 978-0-85745-945-9.
