= The Spoils of War (TV serial) =

- Genre: Drama
- Created by: John Finch
- Written by: John Finch; H. V. Kershaw (as Harry Kershaw)
- Composer: Derek Hilton
- Country of origin: United Kingdom
- No. of episodes: 20

Production
- Producers: John Brabazon; Michael Cox; Richard Everitt
- Running time: 20 x 60 minutes
- Production company: Granada Television

Original release
- Network: ITV
- Release: 1980 – 1981

The Spoils of War is a British television serial of 1980–1981, made by Granada Television, dealing with the return from the Second World War of the younger members of two families in the north of England. The middle-class Warringtons own a coal mine, soon to be nationalized by the first majority Labour government, while the Haywards are from the working class and are Labour supporters.

The show was written by John Finch and H. V. Kershaw. Finch also wrote Sam, A Family at War, Flesh and Blood, and other historical family dramas for Granada.

== Cast ==
- Alan Hunter as Blake Hayward
- William Lucas as George Hayward
- James Bate as Mark Warrington
- Ian Hastings as Keir Hayward
- Jane How as Rosalynde Warrington
- David Langton as John Warrington
- Colette O'Neil as Beth Warrington
- Malcolm Tierney as Richard Warrington
- Avis Bunnage as Helen Hayward
- Anita Carey as Martha Blaze
- Malcolm Hebden as Jack Blaze
- Nat Jackley as Harry Hayward
- Catherine Schell as Paula Brandt
- Madelaine Newton as Jean Hayward
- Leslie Schofield as Owen Hayward
- Gary Carp as Lovett Hayward
- Emily Moore as Peg Warrington
- John Francis Foley as Colin Hayward
- William Boyde as Bill Waters
- Wolf Kahler as Brandt
- David Kerr as Emil Brandt
- Katja Kersten as Herta Brandt
- James Tomlinson as Willie Morris
- Harry Markham as Moxon
- Allan Surtees as Tom Poster
