= The Pink Jungle =

1968 film by Delbert Mann

- Directed by: Delbert Mann
- Screenplay by: Charles Williams
- Based on: adapting the 1965 novel Snake Water by Alan Williams
- Produced by: Stan Margulies
- Starring: James Garner; Eva Renzi; George Kennedy; Nigel Green
- Cinematography: Russell Metty
- Edited by: William B. Murphy
- Music by: Ernie Freeman
- Production company: Cherokee Productions
- Distributed by: Universal Pictures
- Release date: October 16, 1968 (United States)
- Running time: 104 minutes
- Country: United States
- Language: English

The Pink Jungle is a 1968 American adventure comedy film directed by Delbert Mann starring James Garner, Eva Renzi, George Kennedy and Nigel Green.

"I made this thing for the money and I'm lucky it didn't wreck my career," Garner wrote in his memoir.

== Plot ==
An American fashion photographer, Ben Morris (James Garner), goes to Guadagil, a remote village in South America, to take pictures of model Alison Duquesne (Eva Renzi) for a lipstick ad. One of the lipsticks is called "Pink Jungle".

She arrives soon after Ben does, escorted by Raul Ortega (Michael Ansara) from the tourist board. Within minutes of being landed the helicopter in which they arrived is stolen, leaving Ben and Alison stranded in the village.

Ben is hassled by Colonel Celaya (Fabrizio Mioni), a security officer anxious to get a promotion to the capital, who is convinced Ben must be a spy for the American government. But a search of Ben's baggage finds only camera equipment and lipstick. Ben and Alison go to the town bar, where they are joined by Ortega. Meanwhile, two thugs assault and kill the helicopter pilot, wanting information on how it had come to be stolen. The thugs are joined by Ortega, who is revealed to be their leader.

To relieve their boredom Ben and Alison rent a car to drive to the nearest town. On their way the car is stopped at gunpoint by the same man who stole the helicopter. He forces them to take him with them. The hijacker is a boisterous South African adventurer, Sammy Ryderbeit (George Kennedy). He tells them he and his partner have a map to a fabulous diamond mine, but they need $2,000 to equip an expedition to get there.

In a bar in town Ben and Alison meet with Sammy's partner, an English ex-army man Captain Stopes. Also in the bar are Ortega and his men. Ben and Alison believe the entire tale of the diamond mine is a swindle. However, when Stopes is murdered in his hotel room, with Ben and Alison and Sammy suspected and pursued by the police, Ben is compelled to finance the diamond mine expedition as a way for him and Alison to sneak out of town. They are watched doing so by Ortega and his men.

Along the trail Ben, Alison and Sammy encounter McCune (Nigel Green), a devious Australian who claims to be Stopes's former partner and says he has the only actual map to the mine. He surreptitiously substitutes Sammy's map for his own, which he pretends is the one he has always had. McCune demands to take over the leadership of the expedition, in return he will give the others a small share in the mine. Although they distrust him, the three reluctantly agree. While resting up for the next day all the men posture about, demonstrating excellent marksmanship with pistols.

Almost immediately after they resume their search the men start fighting with each other. That night McCune demands that the men allow him to bed Alison. Sammy says nothing, but Ben will not allow it and he and McCune fight. Ben and Alison have a private conversation in which they admit to having fallen in love with each other. Later that night McCune sneaks out of camp to leave a message, along with the map he tricked out of Sammy, along the trail.

During the next day the expedition pauses to rest out the sun's hottest hours. While the others are asleep McCune takes off with the supplies and mules, leaving them to die of thirst. But he is pursued by them, and when he takes a wrong turn it allows them to catch up with him. He hears them coming and takes up a position to shoot Ben, but just as he is about to fire he is shot dead by Sammy.

They search McCune's body for the map, and not finding it realize he must have left it for others. Just then a helicopter is heard and seen flying overhead. The three proceed to where the helicopter had landed, and see Ortega sitting in front of a tent counting diamonds. The helicopter arrives again, bringing in more diamonds, but this time the men flying in have seen the three. The members of the helicopter party spread out to attack them, but in the shootout that follows the three prevail and Ortega is captured.

Sammy flies Ben and Alison (and Ortega, their prisoner) back to Guadagil, saying he knows someone there who will buy the diamonds and pay in American dollars. But as soon as the others exit the helicopter he takes off, with all the diamonds. Ortega turns out to be an underground leader long wanted by local law officials. They are so pleased in at last having him in custody that they don't care about anything Ben and Sammy may have done.

Ben and Alison are desperate to leave. Ben talks to the jubilant Colonel Celaya, who has taken the credit for having captured Ortega, hoping the officer will arrange to have them flown out. The colonel will not help with that, but does say he is sorry for having initially mistaken such a bungler as Ben for a CIA agent.

Ben walks to a private spot, converts his camera into a two-way radio, and sends a message to his contact person. Ben is not just a photographer, he is a U.S. government agent sent to quell a revolution led by Ortega. Because of Sammy's assistance in accomplishing the mission, Ben tells his contact to allow Sammy to get away.

== Cast ==
- James Garner as Ben Morris
- Eva Renzi as Alison Duquesne
- George Kennedy as Sammy Reiderbeit
- Nigel Green as McCune
- Michael Ansara as Raul Ortega
- George Rose as Stopes
- Fabrizio Mioni as Coronel Celaya
- Vincent Beck as Sanchez
- Val Avery as Rodriguez
- Robert Carricart as Benavides
- Natividad Vacío as Figueroa

== Production ==
The film was based on the novel Snake Water published in 1965. It was the second novel from Allan Williams. Reviewing it the New York Times said Williams "is a highly endowed practicioner[sic] in the art of make believe."

In January 1966 Universal bought the film rights and head of production Edward Muhl assigned Harry Keller to produce.

In June 1967 Universal announced James Garner would star in the film, which was now produced by Stan Marguilies. Delbert Mann was assigned to direct the film, then known as The Jolly Pink Jungle.

Filming began 17 July 1967. The film was shot near Pyramid Lake, close to Reno.

== Reception ==
The Los Angeles Times called it an "uninspired comedy."

== See also ==
- List of American films of 1968
