= Fantasia for Strings =

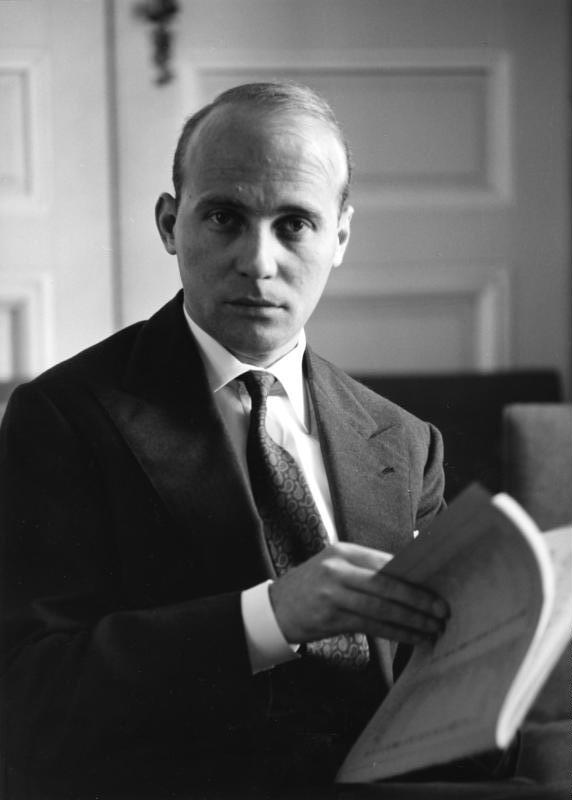
Hans Werner Henze in 1960

Fantasia for Strings (German: Fantasia für Streicher) is a composition by German composer Hans Werner Henze. It was finished in 1966, as part of the soundtrack for Volker Schlöndorff's film adaptation of Robert Musil's novel The Confusions of Young Törless. This composition has been published by Schott Music.

== Composition ==
Fantasia for Strings is an abridged concert version of the full score for Der junge Törless, which has never been published and has only been performed for the film. Henze finished both the film score and the Fantasia in 1966, and he chose specifically Renaissance instruments for the film score recording, for it was purposely composed to resemble the baroque style. The Fantasia was eventually first performed on April 1, 1967, in Berlin, by the Berlin Philharmonic conducted by Hans Zender. Part of the Fantasia is played over the closing credits of the 1973 horror film The Exorcist.

== Structure ==
The structure of this composition is a controversial topic, for it is unclear in the score how many movements it consists of. In the published version, the index includes seven movements; however, in the score, only six movements are listed. Some experts have stated that the work could be considered as a four-movement composition, because movements one, two, and three all resemble one another, creating thus a tripartite adagio and are used in the movie as the Törless family arrives at the school. According to the score itself, the movement list should be as follows:

According to the score disposition:
1. Adagio
2. Tempo eines Trauermarsch
3. Espressivo
4. Allegro – Poco meno mosso

1. Air
2. Pastorale
3. Air

1. Vivace
2. Epilogo

According to the index:
1. Adagio
2. Tempo eines Trauermarsch
3. Espressivo
4. Allegro
5. Air
6. Vivace
7. Epilogo

The composition is scored for violins I, violins II, violas, cellos and double basses. However, Henze uses the divisi a number of times throughout the whole composition, to the point that some of the voices can be divided into more than four staves. A performance takes about 16 minutes.

== Notable recordings ==
This composition has been very rarely performed, even though it has been featured in other audiovisual products. The following is a list of recordings of Henze's Fantasia:

Orchestra	Conductor	Record company	Year of recording	Format
Collegium Musicum Zürich	Paul Sacher	Deutsche Grammophon	1968	CD
Camerata Salzburg	Leonidas Kavakos	Orfeo	2003	CD
