= The Bird Who Knew Too Much =

- The Avengers episode
- Episode no.: Season 5 Episode 5
- Directed by: Roy Rossotti
- Written by: Brian Clemens (teleplay); Alan Pattillo (story)
- Original air dates: 8 February 1967 (Southern Television); 11 February 1967 (ABC Weekend TV)

Guest appearances
- Ron Moody; Ilona Rodgers; Kenneth Cope; Michael Coles

Episode chronology
← Previous "The See-Through Man"	Next → "The Winged Avenger"

"The Bird Who Knew Too Much" is the fifth episode of the fifth series of the 1960s cult British spy-fi television series The Avengers, starring Patrick Macnee and Diana Rigg, and guest starring Ron Moody, Ilona Rodgers, Kenneth Cope, and Michael Coles. It was first broadcast in the Southern and Tyne Tees regions of the ITV network on Wednesday 8 February 1967. ABC Weekend Television, who commissioned the show for ITV, broadcast it in its own regions three days later on Saturday 11 February. The episode was directed by Roy Rossotti, and written by Brian Clemens.

== Plot ==
When fellow counter-espionage agents are murdered checking out a plot to sell secrets of a missile base to foreign powers, Steed and Emma have to find if birds are being used in the scheme especially under the leadership of Captain Crusoe.

== Cast ==
- Patrick Macnee as John Steed
- Diana Rigg as Emma Peel
- Ron Moody as Jordan
- Ilona Rodgers as Samantha Slade
- Kenneth Cope as Tom Savage
- Michael Coles as Verret
- John Wood as Twitter
- Anthony Valentine as Cunliffe
- Clive Colin Bowler as Robin
- John Lee as Mark Pearson
