= The See-Through Man =

- The Avengers episode
- Opening title
- Episode no.: Season 5 Episode 4
- Directed by: Robert Asher
- Written by: Philip Levene (teleplay)
- Original air dates: 30 January 1967 (Southern Television); 4 February 1967 (ABC Weekend TV)

Guest appearances
- Moira Lister; Warren Mitchell; Roy Kinnear; John Nettleton

Episode chronology
← Previous "Escape in Time"	Next → "The Bird Who Knew Too Much"

"The See-Through Man" is the fourth episode of the fifth series of the 1960s cult British spy-fi television series The Avengers, starring Patrick Macnee and Diana Rigg, and guest starring Moira Lister, Warren Mitchell, Roy Kinnear, and John Nettleton. It was first broadcast in the Southern region of the ITV network on Monday 30 January 1967. ABC Weekend Television, who commissioned the show for ITV, broadcast it in its own regions five days later on Saturday 4 February. The episode was directed by Robert Asher, and written by Philip Levene.

== Plot ==
A Russian agent invisible to the naked eye plans to concoct an invisible formula and steals files from the government bureau meant to be projects for Professor Quilby.

== Cast ==
- Patrick Macnee as John Steed
- Diana Rigg as Emma Peel
- Moira Lister as Elena
- Warren Mitchell as Brodny
- Roy Kinnear as Quilby
- Jonathan Elsom as Ackroyd
- John Nettleton as Sir Andrew Ford
- Harvey Hall as Ulric
- David Glover as Wilton
