= Ernst Lothar =

Austrian writer (1890–1974)

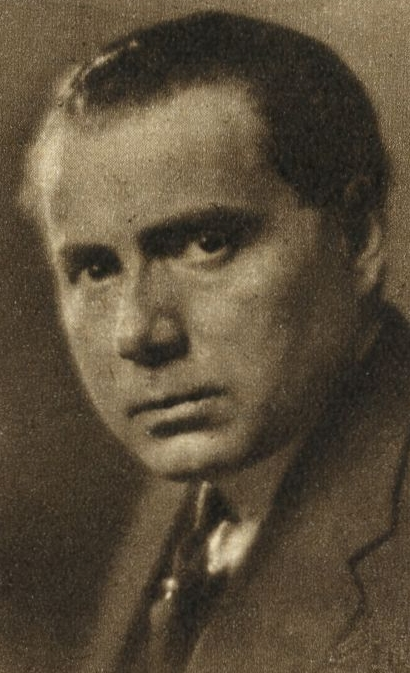
Photography around 1930

Ernst Lothar (German: [ˈloːtar]; 25 October 1890 – 30 October 1974) was a Moravian-Austrian writer, theatre director/manager and producer.

He was born Ernst Lothar Müller, and as Müller is a very common German surname, he dropped it. His brother, Hans Müller-Einigen, by contrast, added a surname.

== Biography ==
Lothar was born in Brünn, Austria-Hungary (now Brno in the Czech Republic) and died in Vienna. Amongst his novels was The Angel with the Trumpet and The Prisoner. In 1943 he published Beneath Another Sun (Doubleday, Doran & Co., Inc., Garden City, N.Y.). It was evidently written in exile as the foreword is signed Colorado Springs, Summer, 1942.

He was married to the Austrian actress Adrienne Gessner. They both fled into exile following the 1938 Anschluss.

== Honours and awards ==
- Bauersfeld Prize (1918)
- Gold Medal of Vienna (1960)
- Kainz Medal (1960)
- Austrian Cross of Honour for Science and Art, 1st class (1961)
- Literature Prize of the City of Vienna (1963)
- Golden Needle of P.E.N. Club (1963)
- Austrian Decoration for Science and Art (1964)
- Honorary member of the Burgtheater and the P.E.N. clubs

== Books in translation (selected) ==
The Loom of Justice (1935), translated by Willa and Edwin Muir

A Woman is Witness: A Paris Diary (1941), translated by June Barrows Mussey

Beneath Another Sun (1943), translated by June Barrows Mussey

The Angel with the Trumpet (1944), made into films of the same name in 1948 and 1950; republished in 2015 as The Vienna Melody, translated by Elizabeth Reynolds Hapgood

The Prisoner: A Novel (1945), translated by James Austin Galston

The Door Opens (1945), translated by Marion A. Werner; illustrated by Garth Williams

== Filmography ==
- Little Friend, directed by Berthold Viertel (UK, 1934, based on the novel Kleine Freundin)
- The Clairvoyant, directed by Maurice Elvey (UK, 1935, based on the novel Der Hellseher)
- The Angel with the Trumpet, directed by Karl Hartl (Austria, 1948, based on the novel Der Engel mit der Posaune)
- An Act of Murder, directed by Michael Gordon (1948, based on the novel Die Mühle der Gerechtigkeit)
- The Angel with the Trumpet, directed by Anthony Bushell (UK, 1950, based on the novel Der Engel mit der Posaune)

Screenwriter

- Leutnant Gustl, directed by John Olden (Austria, 1963, TV film, based on the eponymous novella by Arthur Schnitzler)

== See also ==
- Max Reinhardt
- List of banned authors during the Third Reich
- Theater in der Josefstadt
