= The Angel with the Trumpet (1948 film) =

1948 film

- Directed by: Karl Hartl
- Written by: Ernst Lothar (novel); Karl Hartl; Franz Tassié
- Produced by: Karl Ehrlich
- Starring: Paula Wessely; Helene Thimig; Maria Schell
- Cinematography: Günther Anders
- Edited by: Josefine Ramerstorfer
- Music by: José Padilla; Willy Schmidt-Gentner
- Production company: Neue Wiener Filmproduktion
- Distributed by: Sascha-Verleih
- Release date: 19 August 1948
- Running time: 138 minutes
- Country: Austria
- Language: German

The Angel with the Trumpet (German: Der Engel mit der Posaune) is a 1948 Austrian historical drama film directed by Karl Hartl and starring Paula Wessely, Helene Thimig and Maria Schell. It is based on the novel of the same name by Ernst Lothar. The film was remade in Britain in 1950, under the same title. It entered 1948 Venice International Film Festival.

It was shot at the Rosenhügel Studios in Vienna. The film's sets were designed by the art directors Otto Niedermoser and Walter Schmiedel.

== Plot ==
A family saga set in Vienna from the late nineteenth century to 1945's post-war period. Henriette Stein, the daughter of a Jewish academic, has been having an affair with Crown Prince Rudolf. When the affair ends, she hopes to marry Franz Alt, head of a piano-manufacturing firm. That marriage takes place the same day as Rudolf's suicide in Mayerling. Years pass, Henriette and Franz have children, yet she's tempted by another man. What will she do? And what will become of her when the Nazis come to power in Austria?

== Cast ==
- Paula Wessely as Henriette Stein
- Helene Thimig as Gretel Paskiewicz, geb. Alt
- Hedwig Bleibtreu as Sophie Alt
- Alma Seidler as Pauline Drauffen, geb. Alt
- Maria Schell as Selma Rosner
- Adrienne Gessner as Fürstin Pauline Metternich
- Erni Mangold as Martha Monica Alt
- Attila Hörbiger as Franz Alt
- Paul Hörbiger as Otto Eberhard Alt
- Hans Holt as Hans Alt
- Oskar Werner as Hermann Alt
- Fred Liewehr as Kronprinz Rudolf
- Curd Jürgens as Graf Leopold Thraun
- Anton Edthofer as Kaiser Franz Josef
- Gustav Waldau as Simmerl
- Karl Günther as Oberst Paskiewicz
- Hermann Erhardt as Josef Drauffen
- Alfred Neugebauer as Kriminalbeamter
- Karl Paryla as Czerny
- Karlheinz Böhm as Franz Alt jr.

== Bibliography ==
- Fritsche, Maria. Homemade Men in Postwar Austrian Cinema: Nationhood, Genre and Masculinity. Berghahn Books, 2013.
