= Escape in Time =

- The Avengers episode
- Episode no.: Season 5 Episode 3
- Directed by: John Krish
- Written by: Philip Levene (teleplay)
- Original air dates: 23 January 1967 (Southern Television); 28 February 1967 (ABC Weekend TV)

Guest appearances
- Peter Bowles; Geoffrey Bayldon; Judy Parfitt; Imogen Hassall

Episode chronology
| ← Previous "The Fear Merchants" | Next → "The See-Through Man" |

"Escape in Time" is the third episode of the fifth series of the 1960s cult British spy-fi television series The Avengers, starring Patrick Macnee and Diana Rigg, and guest starring Peter Bowles, Geoffrey Bayldon, Judy Parfitt, and Imogen Hassall. It was first broadcast in the Southern region of the ITV network on Monday 23 January 1967. ABC Weekend Television, who commissioned the show for ITV, broadcast it in its own regions five days later on Saturday 28 January. The episode was directed by John Krish, and written by Philip Levene.

== Plot ==
Clyde Paxton, a Ministry agent, is found dead in the River Thames, having been shot by a centuries old bullet. John Steed and Emma Peel reflect on the bizarre nature of the murder whilst investigating the disappearances of several wanted criminals, including crooked financier Carl Blechner and disgraced President Bibigyn, who all vanished without trace having stolen large sums of money.

Tubby Vincent, another Ministry agent and old friend of Steed, arrives undercover at a house owned by Waldo Thyssen. After stumbling into a machine, he is seemingly transported back to the Stuart period. Vincent is confronted by a man resembling an ancestor of Thyssen's and is mortally wounded. However, Vincent manages to escape and get to Steed's apartment. Before dying, he hands Steed a note, revealing that Colonel Josino, a former South American dictator who fled with swathes of money from his country's national bank, is due to arrive that day in Mackidockie Court, a series of backstreets in London.

Steed and Peel go to Mackidockie Court and follow Josino through an intricately bizarre series of visits to shops, whereupon each time he is given a new stuffed animal to hand to the next proprietor. They lose track of Josino, and Emma narrowly avoids being murdered by an assassin on a motorcycle.

Steed and Peel return to the Court the next day so Steed can follow the same sequence of visits, with Peel watching him, in the hope he can lead them to Vincent's killers. Steed does so successfully, but Peel is diverted by a decoy Steed and loses track of him.

Thyssen greets Steed, who is posing as a criminal. Thyssen reveals that he has constructed a time machine, and in return for 50% of the stolen profits of his customers, sends them into the past to escape justice. He confirms this with footage of Josino seemingly in 1904. Steed participates in a test run of the machine, during which he meets Samuel Thyssen, Waldo's ancestor in 1790.

Returning to the present, Steed goes to find Peel. However, Peel has already gone back to Mackidockie Court and undertaken the sequence of visits herself, bringing her into contact with Thyssen. As Peel enters the machine to be sent to 1790, Thyssen's henchwoman Vesta alerts him that Peel has been investigating them. Enraged, Thyssen sends her to Elizabethan times, into the clutches of his cruel ancestor Matthew Thyssen.

Steed arrives at the Thyssen home and proceeds through a series of rooms, each aligned to a different time period, dispatching Waldo's henchmen along the way. Peel is captured by Matthew and a henchman, but Steed arrives to save her. During the fight, 'Matthew' is revealed to be Waldo in disguise before being incapacitated by Steed and Peel.

In the aftermath, Steed and Peel conclude that the 'time machine' was a con to fool desperate criminals with the test runs. Rather than send them back in time, Thyssen and his associates murdered them for their riches. With the operation successfully dismantled, Steed and Peel relax.

== Cast ==
- Patrick Macnee as John Steed
- Diana Rigg as Emma Peel
- Peter Bowles as Thyssen
- Geoffrey Bayldon as Clapham
- Judy Parfitt as Vesta
- Imogen Hassall as Anjali
- Edward Caddick as Sweeney
- Nicholas Smith as Parker
- Roger Booth as Tubby Vincent
- Richard Montez as Josino
- Clifford Earl as Paxton
- Rocky Taylor as Mitchell
