= Arlberg Express =

1948 film

- Directed by: Eduard von Borsody
- Written by: Curt J. Braun
- Produced by: Eduard Hoesch
- Starring: Paul Hubschmid; Elfe Gerhart; Iván Petrovich
- Cinematography: Hans Androschin
- Edited by: Margarete Smolka
- Music by: Wolfgang Ruß-Bovelino
- Production company: Donau-Filmproduktion
- Distributed by: Renaissance-Film; Herzog Film (Germany)
- Release date: 8 June 1948
- Running time: 96 minutes
- Country: Austria
- Language: German

Arlberg Express (German: Arlberg-Express) is a 1948 Austrian thriller film directed by Eduard von Borsody and starring Paul Hubschmid, Elfe Gerhart and Iván Petrovich. The film's sets were designed by the art director Julius von Borsody.

== Synopsis ==
After returning to Vienna following three years as a prisoner of war, Hans Leitner becomes mixed up a suitcase of stolen jewels and a gang of criminals. Eventually he attempts to escape on the Orient Express.

== Cast ==
- Paul Hubschmid as Hans Leitner
- Elfe Gerhart as Christl Andermann
- Iván Petrovich as Barna
- Hans Putz as Flori Reutner
- Hugo Gottschlich as Toni
- Otto Treßler as Tschurtschrntaler
- Alma Seidler as Lissy
- Liesl Andergast as Frau Steindl
- Melanie Horeschowsky as Frau Hellmann
- Susanne Engelhart as Wirtschafterin
- Josef Krastel as Der Dorflehrer
- Gretl Rainer as Seine Frau

== Bibliography ==
- Fritsche, Maria. Homemade Men in Postwar Austrian Cinema: Nationhood, Genre and Masculinity. Berghahn Books, 2013.
