= Franz Eichberger (actor) =

Austrian film actor

Franz Eichberger (31 July 1919 in Puchberg am Schneeberg – 29 May 1991) was an Austrian actor.

== Biography ==
Franz Eichberger came to the film industry through Leni Riefenstahl. The director was searching for a suitable actor for the role of the young shepherd Pedro in her film adaptation of the opera Tiefland. In her autobiography, she writes that she noticed the then 20-year-old Austrian at the 1939 Kandahar Ski Race in St. Anton am Arlberg, and he visually matched her vision for the film character. After the war, however, an article in the magazine Revue claimed, Riefenstahl made 2,000 Gebirgsjäger walk by in front of her multiple times to choose a suitable actor. Riefenstahl strongly denied this claim and insisted on her version of events, which was confirmed by Eichberger and her former assistant Harald Reinl in sworn statements. However, an article from the early 1940s stated that the director had chosen an actor from among the mountain troops.

Originally a medic, Eichberger was assigned by the Wehrmacht as a ski instructor in the Arlberg area. Although he was extremely shy initially, screen tests confirmed his acting talent. However, there were issues with his dialect, so he received language lessons at a Berlin acting school. After the war, Eichberger received further role offers. In 1947, he appeared in the Austrian-French co-production Wintermelodie. Later, he worked with notable directors such as Georg Wilhelm Pabst (Der Prozeß, Geheimnisvolle Tiefe) and Helmut Käutner (Die letzte Brücke), but mostly in smaller supporting roles. Only in the adaptation of Adalbert Stifter's work, Bergkristall (1949), was he entrusted with a leading role. After Ich heirate Herrn Direktor (1960), Eichberger ended his film career.

== Filmography ==
- 1947: Wintermelodie (Les amours de Blanche Neige)
- 1948: Der Prozeß
- 1949: Geheimnisvolle Tiefe as Bergführer Nino
- 1949: Bergkristall
- 1954: Tiefland as Pedro
- 1954: Die letzte Brücke as a Gebirgsjäger
- 1955: Die Sennerin von St. Kathrein as Otto
- 1959: 12 Mädchen und 1 Mann as Revierinspektor
- 1960: Ich heirate Herrn Direktor as Polizist
