= Forest Liesel =

1956 film

- Directed by: Herbert B. Fredersdorf
- Written by: Theodor Ottawa
- Produced by: Ernest Müller; August Rieger
- Starring: Anita Gutwell; Rudolf Lenz; Lotte Ledl
- Cinematography: Sepp Riff
- Edited by: Brigitte Fredersdorf
- Music by: Hans Hagen
- Production company: Rex-Film
- Distributed by: Union-Film
- Release date: 12 October 1956
- Running time: 88 minutes
- Country: West Germany
- Language: German

Forest Liesel (German: Försterliesel) is a 1956 West German comedy drama film directed by Herbert B. Fredersdorf and starring Anita Gutwell, Rudolf Lenz and Lotte Ledl. It is part of the post-war group of rural-set heimatfilm. The film was made in Agfacolor. The film's sets were designed by Wolf Witzemann. It was shot on location in the Austrian Tyrol. It is a follow-up by Fredersdorf to the previous financial success of The Milkmaid of St. Kathrein (1955).

== Cast ==
- Anita Gutwell as Försterliesel
- Rudolf Lenz as Tony, der junge Jäger
- Lotte Ledl as Zenzi, die Magd
- Rudolf Carl as Zwutschenthaler
- Eva Maria Meineke as Carola
- Erik Frey as Robert Burgert
- Hardo Hesse as Bartl
- Harry Kratz as Heinzl, Liesels Vetter
- Fritz Muliar as Schneider
- Ferry Wondra as Loisl
- Ernst Pröckl
- Walter Stummvoll as Der alte Förster Bregler
- Monika Glieber
- Anton Geiger

== Bibliography ==
- Fritsche, Maria. Homemade Men in Postwar Austrian Cinema: Nationhood, Genre and Masculinity. Berghahn Books, 2013.
