= Apartmentzauber =

1963 film

- Directed by: Helmuth M. Backhaus
- Written by: Helmuth M. Backhaus
- Starring: See below
- Cinematography: Gerhard Krüger
- Edited by: Anneliese Artelt
- Music by: Christian Bruhn
- Release date: 1963
- Running time: 93 minutes
- Country: West Germany
- Language: German

Apartmentzauber is a 1963 West German film directed by Helmuth M. Backhaus.

The film is also known as Apartment-Zauber (alternative spelling).

== Plot ==
According to his parents' wishes, Karl Fischer should marry the young Almut Behringer. Her father owns the thriving transport company Behringer, which bills Karl's father Waldemar huge sums every year for shipping his products. Waldemar figures that marriage could save the family a lot of money. However, Karl flees from Almut as soon as he sees her, so Waldemar and Almut decide to send Karl to a branch of the company in Italy for a year. Here he should learn to appreciate the company and thus also Almut. He is to be accommodated in one of the company's new apartment buildings, which have three rooms per apartment. They are always rented to either three women or three men. Almut's father orders a room for Karl. As he speaks indistinctly, Rochus Valerian, the caretaker of the apartment building, understands that the reservation should be made for a certain Karla. So when Karl arrives, he moves into a women's apartment, which his new roommates Karin and Elfi are not very enthusiastic about. Since Karl is now registered with the authorities as Karla, Valerian cannot make up for his mistake either. Karl, on the other hand, is impressed by the way things are, because he fell in love with Elfi at first sight. However, the young woman has a problem, since she is once again late for work, she is fired on the day Karl arrives. The only job she is offered as a foreigner in Italy is as a barmaid at Nino's establishment. Out of necessity, Elfi accepts the job, even though she hates serving drunk men in provocative clothes. Nino also makes clear advances to her.

Meanwhile, Karl tries in vain to win the friendship of the two women. In the evening he organizes an opulent dinner, but Karin and Elfi simply leave him alone. In a later attempt to surprise both women with dinner, neither of them appears. Elfi has to work while Karin has found a lover, the mad inventor Thomas Butterfield jr., who leaves his girlfriend and benefactor Mabel for her. Only Valerian keeps Karl company. It is also he who warns the unequal trio a little later that the moral police have found out that Karin and Elfi are sharing the apartment with a man. Without further ado, Karl is disguised as Karla and plays his role so well that the vice inspector doesn't notice the trick. While Karl and Elfi get closer, at home Almut and Waldemar suspect that something is wrong. They travel to Italy and find Karl and Elfi together on the beach. Elfi is disappointed when she learns that Karl is engaged to Almut and runs away. However, Karl hurries after her and explains that the engagement happened against his will. A little later, Karl and Valerian secretly follow Elfie to Nino's bar. Here, Karl saves Elfi from Nino, who wants to seduce her. Karl and Elfi reconcile and there is a happy ending.

== Cast ==
- Rex Gildo as Karl Fischer aka Karla Fischer
- Gunnar Möller as Thomas Butterfield jr.
- Helga Sommerfeld as Karin
- Gitta Winter as Elfi
- Mario del Marius as Baldrian
- Lotte Ledl as Mabel
- Gerti Gordon as Almut Behringer
- Carola Höhn as Frau Fischer
- Elma Karlowa as Geschäftsinhaberin
- Ilse Steppat as Sittenkommissarin
- Horst Naumann as Barbesitzer Nino
- Heinz Erhardt as Waldemar Fischer
