= Young Törless =

- German: Der junge Törless
- Directed by: Volker Schlöndorff
- Written by: Volker Schlöndorff; Herbert Asmodi
- Based on: The Confusions of Young Törless (1906 novel) by Robert Musil
- Produced by: Louis Malle; Franz Seitz
- Starring: Mathieu Carrière; Marian Seidowsky; Bernd Tischer; Fred Dietz; Lotte Ledl; Jean Launay; Barbara Steele
- Cinematography: Franz Rath
- Edited by: Claus von Boro
- Music by: Hans Werner Henze
- Production companies: Franz Seitz Filmproduktion; Nouvelles Éditions de Films S.A.
- Distributed by: Nora Filmverleih
- Release date: 9 May 1966 (Cannes)
- Running time: 87 minutes
- Countries: West Germany; France
- Language: German

Young Törless (German: Der junge Törless) is a 1966 period drama film written and directed by Volker Schlöndorff in his feature directorial debut. Adapted by Schlöndorff and Herbert Asmodi from Robert Musil's 1906 novel The Confusions of Young Törless, the film deals with the violent and sadistic tendencies of a group of boys at an Austrian military academy at the beginning of the 20th century. It was co-produced by Louis Malle and stars Mathieu Carrière in the titular role, along with Lotte Ledl and Barbara Steele in supporting parts

== Plot ==
At the beginning of the 20th century, Thomas Törless arrives at the academy and learns how Anselm von Basini has been caught stealing by fellow student Reiting. Basini is obliged to become Reiting's "slave", bowing to Reiting's sadistic rituals, and being repeatedly tortured and sexually abused by him and another student, Beineberg. Törless follows their relationship with intellectual interest but without emotional involvement.

Beineberg also takes Törless along to visit Bozena, the local prostitute, who is the mother of an infant born after she was impregnated and abandoned by an employer when she was working as a servant for an aristocratic family. Again, Törless is aloof and more intrigued than excited by the woman.

He is however very eager to understand imaginary numbers, which are mentioned in his maths lesson. The maths teacher is unwilling or unable to explain what these are, stating that in life, emotion is what rules everything as even mathematics.

After Basini is humiliated and suspended upside down in the school gym because of one of Reiting's intrigues, Törless realises intellectually that the other boys are simply cruel. He seems no more or less emotionally moved by this than by the revelation that he cannot understand imaginary numbers. He decides that he does not want to partake in cruelty, so decides to leave the academy. His teachers think that he is too "highly strung" for his own good, and do not want him to stay anyway as they are part of the system which can allow such terrible things to be done to the weak and vulnerable.

At the end of the film, Törless is dismissed from the school and leaves with his mother, smiling.

== Cast ==
- Mathieu Carrière as Thomas Törless
- Marian Seidowsky as Anselm von Basini
- Bernd Tischer as Beineberg
- Fred Dietz as Reiting
- Lotte Ledl as Innkeeper
- Jean Launay as Maths teacher
- Barbara Steele as Bozena
- Hanna Axmann-Rezzori as Törless' mother
- Herbert Asmodi as Törless' father
- Fritz Gehlen as Headmaster

== Music ==
The film's significance as a cultural artifact of German post-World War II introspection is enhanced by the fact that its haunting medieval-sounding score was written by the German modernist composer Hans Werner Henze. Henze, who came of age during the war, was prominent enough in this introspection by virtue of his left-political activism in the arts to feel driven to expatriation from Germany. He later arranged a suite from the original score titled Fantasia for Strings.

== Release and reception ==
Young Törless was screened on 9 May 1966 at the Cannes Film Festival. The film won the FIPRESCI Prize at the 1966 Cannes Film Festival. It was also selected as the German entry for the Best Foreign Language Film at the 39th Academy Awards, but was not accepted as a nominee.

== In popular culture ==
Footage from the film was used in the 2023 music video for the song "The Lost Room" by the Pet Shop Boys.

== See also ==
- List of submissions to the 39th Academy Awards for Best Foreign Language Film
- List of German submissions for the Academy Award for Best Foreign Language Film
