= Street of Temptation =

1962 film

- Directed by: Imo Moszkowicz
- Written by: Hans Jacoby
- Produced by: Luggi Waldleitner
- Starring: Mario Adorf; Karin Baal; Johanna von Koczian
- Cinematography: Klaus von Rautenfeld
- Edited by: Elisabeth Kleinert-Neumann
- Music by: Martin Böttcher
- Production company: Roxy Film
- Distributed by: Nora Film
- Release date: 13 November 1962
- Running time: 93 minutes
- Country: West Germany
- Language: German

Street of Temptation (German: Straße der Verheißung) is a 1962 West German drama film directed by Imo Moszkowicz and starring Mario Adorf, Karin Baal and Johanna von Koczian.

== Cast ==
- Mario Adorf as Joe
- Karin Baal as Nina
- Johanna von Koczian as Valentina
- Amedeo Nazzari as Herr im seidenen Anzug
- Wolfgang Wahl as Marcello
- Paul Muller as Dr. Salvatori
- Lotte Ledl as Marisa
- Gretl Schörg as Rita
- Carola Rasch as Elvira
- Wolfgang Völz as Knut
- Olive Moorefield as Sängerin im Paradiso

== See also ==
- Sliding Doors (1998)

== Bibliography ==
- Bock, Hans-Michael & Bergfelder, Tim. The Concise CineGraph. Encyclopedia of German Cinema. Berghahn Books, 2009.
