= Albert Rueprecht =

Austrian actor (1929–2026)

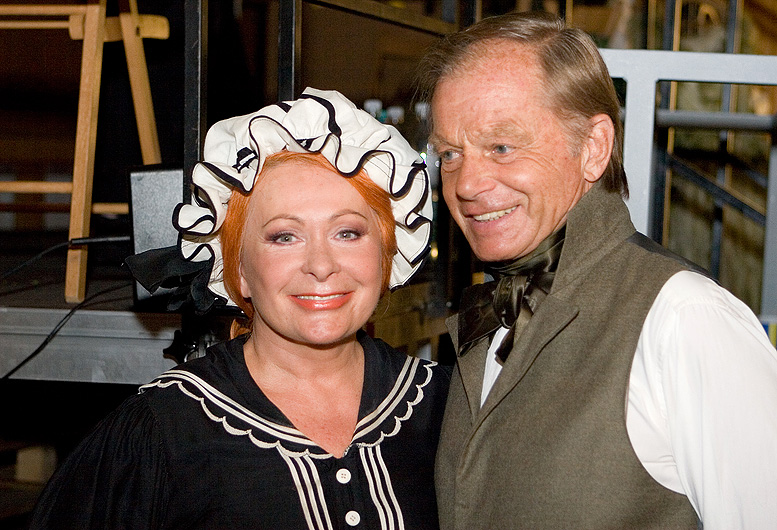
- Albert Rueprecht and Brigitte Neumeister (2006)
- Born: 24 July 1929
- Died: 3 October 2026 (aged 97); Baden District, Austria
- Occupation: Actor

Albert Rueprecht (24 July 1929 – 3 October 2026) was an Austrian actor. He appeared in The Bird Seller, The Forester of the Silver Wood, and Song Without End.

== Life and career ==
Born in Vienna on 24 July 1929, Rueprecht gained his first theatrical experience while attending the Akademisches Gymnasium. In his final years, Rueprecht lived at the Hilde-Wagener-Künstlerheim in Baden. He was married to, among others, the actress Ellen Umlauf, who died in 2000. He died on 3 October 2026, at the age of 97.
