= The Forester of the Silver Wood =

1954 film

- Directed by: Alfons Stummer
- Written by: Franz Mayr-Melnhof (idea); Friedrich Schreyvogel; Günther Schwab; Alfons Stummer; Alfred Solm
- Produced by: Karl Hitschfel
- Starring: Anita Gutwell; Rudolf Lenz; Karl Ehmann
- Cinematography: Walter Tuch
- Edited by: Eleonore Kunze
- Music by: Viktor Hruby
- Production company: Rondo Film
- Distributed by: Sascha Film (Austria); Union-Film (W. Germany)
- Release date: 25 November 1954
- Running time: 90 minutes
- Countries: Austria; West Germany
- Language: German

The Forester of the Silver Wood (German: Der Förster vom Silberwald) is a 1954 Austrian-West German drama film directed by Alfons Stummer and starring Anita Gutwell, Rudolf Lenz and Karl Ehmann. It is part of the post-war trend of heimatfilm set in rural Austria or southern Germany. It was a popular success, leading to several follow-up films with the same lead actors including The Poacher of the Silver Wood. In Austria it was released as Echo of the Mountains (German: Echo der Berge).

It was shot at the Sievering Studios in Vienna with location shooting in Salzburg and the Tyrol. The film's sets were designed by the art director Eduard Stolba.

== Cast ==
- Anita Gutwell as Liesl
- Rudolf Lenz as Hubert
- Karl Ehmann as Hofrat Leonhard
- Erik Frey as Max
- Hermann Erhardt as Oberkogler
- Erni Mangold as Karin
- Albert Rueprecht
- Lotte Ledl as Vroni
- Franz Erkenger
- Gerti Wiedner
- Walter Varndal
- Fritz Hinz-Fabricius
- Kjeld-Fynn Schoonmaker

== Bibliography ==
- Baer, Hester. Dismantling the Dream Factory: Gender, German Cinema, and the Postwar Quest for a New Film Language. Berghahn Books, 2012.
