= Sepp Riff =

Austrian cinematographer

- Born: 17 February 1928; Neuhofen, Upper-Austria; Austria
- Died: 12 February 2000 (aged 71); Baden bei Wien, Austria
- Occupation: Cinematographer
- Years active: 1952–1976

Sepp Riff (17 February 1928 – 12 February 2000) was an Austrian cinematographer. He worked on a number of films and television series, including the 1955 comedy film His Daughter is Called Peter.

== Selected filmography ==
- His Daughter is Called Peter (1955)
- Forest Liesel (1956)
- Her Corporal (1956)

== Bibliography ==
- Fritsche, Maria. Homemade Men in Postwar Austrian Cinema: Nationhood, Genre and Masculinity. Berghahn Books, 2013.
