= Schlosshotel Orth =

Austrian TV series

- Country of origin: Austria

Schlosshotel Orth is an Austrian television series.

== See also ==
- List of Austrian television series
