= Alexander Lernet-Holenia =

Austrian writer

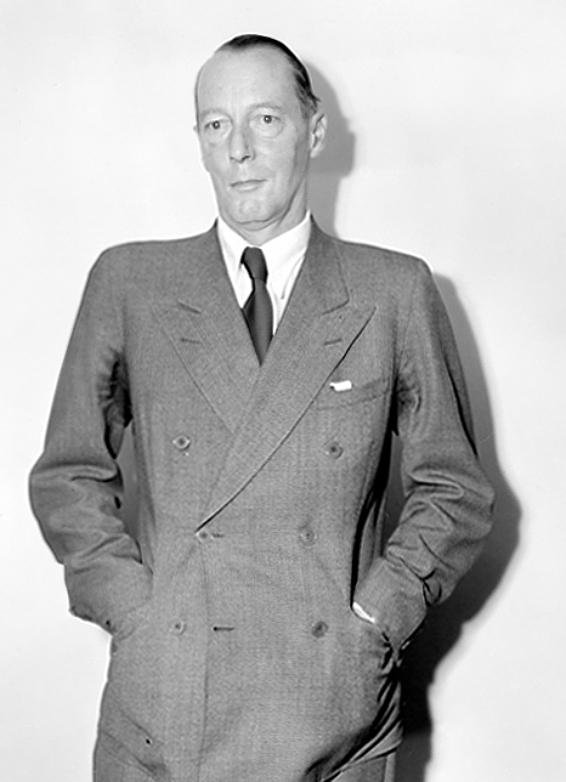
- Lernet-Holenia in 1947
- Born: Alexander Marie Norbert Lernet; 21 October 1897; Vienna, Austria-Hungary
- Died: 3 July 1976 (aged 78); Vienna, Austria
- Occupations: Poet, novelist
- Spouse: Eva Vollbach
- Writing career
- Pen name: Clemens Neydisser, G. T. Dampierre
- Period: 1917–1974

Alexander Lernet-Holenia (October 21, 1897 in Vienna – July 3, 1976, in Vienna) was an Austrian writer, dramatist, and poet whose extensive body of work ranks among the most significant German-language literature of the 20th century. In his writing, he combined historical and fantastical elements with a stylistically sophisticated, often poetic language and a philosophical depth that reflects themes such as fate, identity, and the upheavals of the 20th century.

== Youth and service in World War I ==
Alexander Maria Norbert Lernet was born on October 21, 1897, in Vienna. His mother, Sidonie von Boyneburgk-Stettfeld (1856–1935), née Holenia, was the daughter of the wealthy Carinthian mining industrialist Romuald Holenia.

Sidonie was first married to Baron Julius von Boyneburgk-Stettfeld (1834–1890) and, seven years after his death and shortly before Alexander was born, remarried the ten-years-younger Austrian Navy officer Alexander Lernet (1866–1922). This unexpected union, which ended after a short time in a divorce drama, was often interpreted as an attempt to conceal Archduke Charles Stephen of Habsburg’s affection for Sidonie. The rumour that Archduke Karl was his father, neither confirmed nor denied by Lernet-Holenia himself, divided family, friends, and interpreters. In literary terms, however, it became an "origin secret" that runs through his works, populated by illegitimate children, impostors, doubles, and genealogical enigmas.

Lernet-Holenia grew up between Vienna and Klagenfurt and completed his secondary school in Waidhofen an der Ybbs in 1915. In September of the same year, he volunteered for military service. Like many young men of his generation, he went – buoyed by patriotic enthusiasm – straight from school to the front lines of the First World War.

Assigned to the 9th Dragoon Regiment "Archduke Albrecht", Lernet-Holenia fought in Slovakia, Eastern Galicia, Russia, Ukraine, and Hungary. In 1916, he was promoted to officer-cadet. That same year, he had an encounter that would prove formative for both him and his work: his meeting with Lieutenant Colonel Karl Anton Klammer (1879–1959), a passionate admirer of French culture who, under the pseudonym K. L. Ammer, made a name for himself as a translator of Villon, Rimbaud, Maeterlinck, and Verlaine. His poetic adaptations – especially of Le Bateau ivre – inspired young Expressionists such as Heym and Trakl. The long conversations Lernet-Holenia held with his military superior strengthened his inclination toward the lyrical. Thanks to an Italian nurse, Lernet also mastered Italian as well as English, which later benefited his work as a translator.

In 1917, he was promoted to lieutenant and was decorated for his bravery in the field. In Ukraine, he witnessed the collapse of the Habsburg Empire and the disintegration of the Austro-Hungarian army – experiences that would leave deep traces in his work. They are reflected in some of his poems and shaped many of his narratives and novels – especially Die Standarte (1934, tr. The Standard or The Glory Is Departed), Der Baron Bagge (1936, tr. Baron Bagge), and Beide Sizilien (1942), which rank among his best-known prose works. After returning from the front, Lernet-Holenia also took part in the Austro-Slovene conflict in Carinthia in 1919.

== The 1920s ==
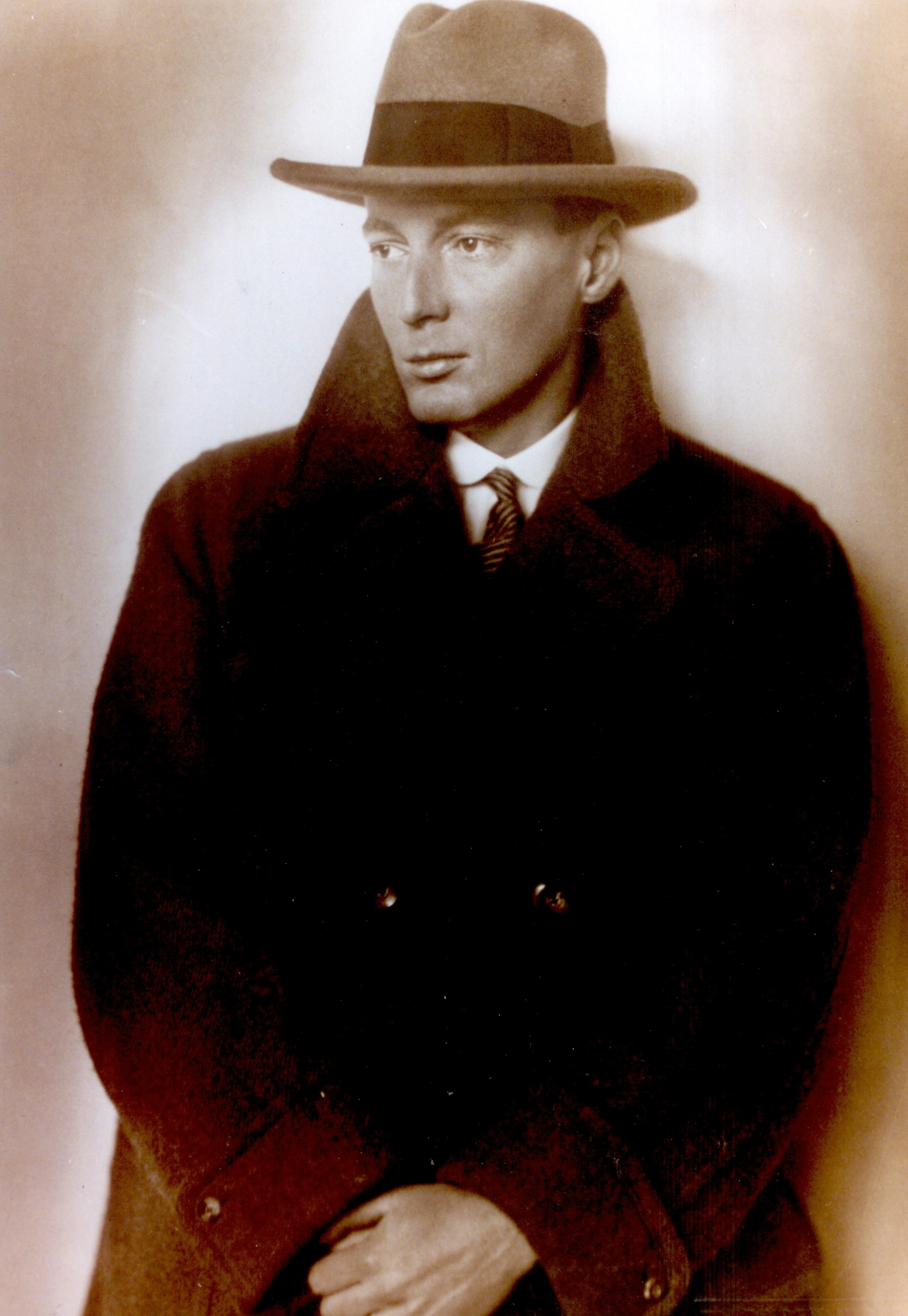
Alexander Lernet-Holenia, circa 1926

In 1920, he was adopted by his mother’s wealthy family, who lived in Carinthia, and from then on bore the double name Lernet-Holenia, though for the sake of abbreviation he is often referred to simply as "Lernet". He entered the literary scene in the early 1920s with sophisticated Expressionist poetry before turning to the theatre. He had already written his first poems at the age of seventeen and, from the Russian front, had sent them to Rainer Maria Rilke, whom he deeply admired. He signed his first volume of poetry, Pastorale, published in a small edition in 1921 by the Viennese Literarische Anstalt, with the name Alexander Maria Lernet. Under the patronage of Rainer Maria Rilke and Hermann Bahr, Lernet published his second volume of poetry, Kanzonnair, with Insel Verlag in 1923.

Hermann Bahr counted Lernet among the "greatest hopes" of German-language Expressionist literature at the time and enthusiastically welcomed the tragedy Demetrius (1925). Indeed, Lernet’s early dramatic works quickly brought him major recognition: in 1926, at the age of 29, he was awarded the Kleist Prize for the three plays Demetrius, Ollapotrida, and Österreichische Komödie.

This distinction also gave him the opportunity to display the provocative streak that would characterize him throughout his life: in 1930, in response to an alleged plagiarism controversy surrounding another play (Attraktion, co-written with Paul Frank), he publicly and demonstratively renounced the Kleist Prize. Lernet’s apparent nonchalance about awards reflected a complex relationship to writing, marked by the modesty of an author who, out of reverence for masterpieces of the past, refused to regard contemporary works – including his own – as their equal. This attitude, which manifested itself both socially and literarily, led to him being described by friends and admirers as "the last grand seigneur of Austrian literature".

As far as the theatre was concerned, Lernet’s trajectory led from Expressionism and lyrical drama to comedy and boulevard plays. Ollapotrida (1926) marked his first financial success. In the five years that followed, audiences remained loyal to the comedies he wrote, whether alone or in collaboration. Critics were more reserved, but these works provided the author with a solid financial security.

Shaped by the spirit of lyricism and theatre, the 1920s were also the period in which Lernet formed contacts and friendships that stood in sharp contrast to the deliberate dilettantism he cultivated. Prominent older contemporaries such as Stefan Zweig and Hugo von Hofmannsthal recognized the quality of his works.

From 1927 until the Second World War, Lernet divided his time between Vienna and St. Wolfgang, where, since 1900, his mother had owned a house that she later bequeathed to him. In St. Wolfgang, he was a neighbour of Stefan Zweig, who had been living in Salzburg since 1919. In 1928, the two jointly wrote the comedy Gelegenheit macht Liebe under the pseudonym Clemens Neydisser. Their mutual esteem led Zweig to actively support Lernet’s career. He introduced him to the publisher Herbert Reichner, who subsequently published three of Lernet’s works.

An especially close confidant during this period was Carl Zuckmayer, with whom he had been connected since 1926, when Zuckmayer acquired a house in Henndorf near Salzburg. He followed Lernet’s literary development with great attention. In 1939, for example, he wrote to Annemarie Seidel, the wife of Peter Suhrkamp and an editor at the Suhrkamp publishing house, that the novel Ein Traum in Rot had "completely delighted, enchanted, and captivated" him. He emphasized Lernet’s ability to surprise his readers time and again, as well as his "at once sovereign and humble way of handling language.

Lernet also associated with Ödön von Horváth, who chose him as best man for his brief marriage to the singer Maria Elsner. Finally, mention should be made of Leo Perutz, whom Lernet met in July 1928 in St. Wolfgang. Until 1938, the year Perutz emigrated to Palestine, the two men maintained close ties in Vienna. Perutz, a master of fantastic fiction, took a keen interest in Lernet’s novels and provided him with the idea for the novel Jo und der Herr zu Pferde. Their relationship endured even the radical rupture of the Second World War. From 1950 onward, Perutz, who had settled in Tel Aviv, returned every year to spend the summer months in St. Wolfgang and the autumn in Vienna. In August 1957, he fell seriously ill in St. Wolfgang and died a few days later in Bad Ischl. Lernet took on the task of overseeing the posthumous publication of the novel Der Judas des Leonardo (tr. Leonardo’s Judas), which Perutz had completed shortly before his death.

== The 1930s ==
After a decade devoted to poetry and the theatre, the 1930s saw Lernet enter a period of intense narrative production (around thirty longer and shorter stories were written), without his abandoning the other genres.

His first venture into prose came in 1930 with Die nächtliche Hochzeit, a novel based on his play of the same name. A year later, a second novel followed, Die Abenteuer eines jungen Herrn in Polen (tr. A Young Gentleman in Poland), which reversed the original relationship between novel and theatre: it led to a stage adaptation in 1932, Die Abenteuer der Kascha. Commercial success came very quickly, and Lernet’s production of fantastic novels began to stand out clearly. He owed a broad readership to his prose, which made his financial situation even more comfortable and until the war, he was able to undertake extended journeys – throughout Europe (France, Belgium, the Netherlands, Switzerland, Italy, Greece), as well as Egypt and North and South America.

Among the numerous texts published during this decade and highly praised by critics and contemporaries are: Ich war Jack Mortimer (1933, tr. I was Jack Mortimer), Die Standarte (1934, tr. The Standard or The Glory Is Departed), Der Baron Bagge (1936, tr. Baron Bagge), Der Mann im Hut (1937, tr. The Man in the Hat), and Ein Traum in Rot (1939). As early as 1934 and 1935, Die Abenteuer eines jungen Herrn in Polen (tr. A Young Gentleman in Poland), Ich war Jack Mortimer (tr. I was Jack Mortimer), and Die Standarte (tr. The Standard or The Glory Is Departed) were adapted for film. Some of these works have an autobiographical dimension. They are often set along the front lines of the First World War, and each centres on an officer of the Austrian Imperial Army. Die Standarte (tr. The Standard or The Glory Is Departed) depicts the dissolution of the Austro-Hungarian army in the Balkans in October 1918. The fantastical love novella Der Baron Bagge (tr. Baron Bagge) begins in February 1915 on the northeastern borders of present-day Hungary and continues into Slovakia and then Poland.

These narratives appeared at a time when the political horizon was darkening day by day. The Nazi regime regarded Lernet-Holenia as a "decadent" author and, on May 1, 1933, placed the novel Jo und der Herr zu Pferde on the first "blacklist" of literary works, which served as the basis for the book burnings of May 10, 1933. At the end of May 1933, the renowned German poet Gottfried Benn declared in an open letter his support for National Socialism and his opposition to the writers who had gone into exile. His stance provoked a storm of both outrage and approval among German-speaking authors. Lernet held Benn in high literary esteem that never faded; nevertheless, as early as May 27, 1933, he expressed in a very long letter his deep disapproval of Benn’s loyalty to National Socialism.

In 1935, the Nazi administration sent a communication to the Film Quota Office (Filmkontingentamt) in Berlin stating that Lernet-Holenia’s work was "unacceptable for a National Socialist audience" and that his person should "be rejected on account of his intellectual productions […] as if he were of non-Aryan descent."

On the evening of March 13, 1938, the day of the Anschluss, Lernet met with close friends who were threatened in various ways by the new regime: all of them – Carl Zuckmayer, Ödön von Horváth, Franz Theodor Csokor, and Albrecht Joseph – chose exile. Lernet himself boarded a cruise ship on January 8, 1939, traveling to the Caribbean and the United States together with Maria Charlotte ("Lotte") Sweceny. His relationship with this young woman, née Stein, from a Jewish Viennese publishing family, lasted several years (1939–1942). The available information about this journey does not allow one to determine with certainty whether it was an attempt by Lernet to consider the possibility of emigration as well. However, Lotte and he returned to Europe in the spring of 1939. In August, Lernet was called up for the Polish campaign, following a chronology that his novel Mars im Widder (tr. Mars in Aries) later reconstructed in meticulous detail.

== Second World War ==
Like Wallmoden, the protagonist of Mars im Widder (tr. Mars in Aries), Lernet was called up on August 15, 1939, in his capacity as a reserve officer for a one-month period of military service with his unit. Like Wallmoden, he received marching orders on August 22 to an initially unknown destination and, on September 1, was drawn into the invasion of Poland, where – again like Wallmoden – he was wounded in the right hand the very next day, but remained on duty until October 23, the end of the fighting in Poland.

He immediately tried to be relieved of from active front duty, citing not only his wound but also alleged writing contracts he needed to fulfil. Among others, he turned to the publisher Peter Suhrkamp, who at the time was working for S. Fischer, Lernet’s principal publisher since the 1920s, as well as to the director and president of the Reich Chamber of Film (Reichsfilmkammer), Carl Froelich, and to the actor Emil Jannings, who owned a residence in St. Wolfgang and had influence with Goebbels.

According to Lernet’s biographer, Roman Roček, it was above all Jannings’s intervention that proved decisive, as he secured for Lernet screenwriting contracts with impressive titles – for which he never wrote a single line. Ultimately, he was granted leave from the front, which, on the basis of newly submitted fictitious contracts, was extended until the summer of 1941.

Hardly had he returned to Vienna and St. Wolfgang when, drawing on notebooks he had diligently kept at the front, he wrote the novel Mars im Widder (tr. Mars in Aries) in just two months (Dec. 1939 – Feb. 1940). The text had a turbulent publication history. It was first published as a serialized novel in the Berlin weekly Die Dame (Oct. 1940 – Jan. 1941), then, after approval by the High Command of the Wehrmacht, printed by S. Fischer (Feb. 1941 – Apr. 1941). However, in July 1941, those very authorities, together with the Propaganda Ministry, banned its distribution. The printed copies were stored in secret in the publisher’s warehouses in Leipzig and were destroyed during a bombing raid in early December 1943. Thanks to the galley proofs that Lernet had kept, the work was finally published after the war in 1947 in Stockholm by Bermann-Fischer. For a time, the vigilance of Nazi censors may have been misled by the love story that appears to occupy the foreground. Yet at the centre of the narrative – as the title suggests – is the war. The precise account of the military operations refutes the claim of a Polish aggression against Hitler’s Reich and instead shows a Poland taken by surprise – an assessment that would, under the regime, have been deemed an act of treason: "It was evident that Poland hadn’t even mobilized yet…" the text states. The deep respect Lernet shows for the enemy, and the compassion for the "suffering, defeated, shattered Poland", are unmistakable and stood in radical opposition to Nazi doctrine.

In August 1941, one of Lernet’s friends (probably Alfred Bernau) secured for him – apparently without his explicit consent – a position as head of the development unit of the Army Film Office (Heeresfilmstelle) in Berlin. That an author deemed "unacceptable for a National Socialist audience", whose most recent novel had been banned, should be entrusted with such responsibility seemed highly peculiar, not least to himself. He nevertheless accepted the appointment, under pressure from friends and family, in order to avoid returning to the front.

In Berlin, however, he found everything repellent; he had hardly arrived when he made several attempts to rid himself of the position. Yet until January 1943, these various efforts came to nothing. Lernet carried out only limited work in the film sector, collaborating on several screenplays without being credited – with the notable exception of the film Die große Liebe (1942, tr. The Great Love), for which he provided the story and which, starring Zarah Leander, became the most commercially successful film of the Third Reich.

During this period, Lernet associated with Gottfried Benn and Alfred Kubin, and for the first time had the leisure to devote himself entirely to two works that were particularly close to his heart: the novel Beide Sizilien , one of his most complex literary works, published by Suhrkamp in 1942, and the poems of Die Trophäe, which he did not publish until 1946 in a small edition.

In 1943, he was finally given the opportunity to leave Berlin and the Army Film Office (Heeresfilmstelle). According to Roman Roček, this came about through another intervention by Jannings as well as by the father of Lernet’s later wife, Eva Vollbach, whom he had met in 1940 and with whom he had been in a relationship since 1941. Thanks to his abilities as a screenwriter, Lernet was finally granted exempt (unabkömmlich) status, which allowed him to be released from the Wehrmacht. However, in the spring of 1944, he was called up again and was to be transferred to the Hungarian front within 48 hours. He stopped for only one night in Vienna – long enough for his friend Alexander Hartwich to spare him a return to combat by administering an injection that induced a high fever. Ordered to the military hospital in St. Wolfgang, he received support there from his friend the later Austrian Minister of Justice, Christian Broda, who prolonged his recovery until the end of the war by means of false medical certificates.

Lernet’s path during the Second World War – on the one hand censored, threatened, and repeatedly called back to the front, on the other able to evade combat through the intervention of influential acquaintances – followed a paradoxical course that once gave rise to confusion. However, the documents available today and the current state of research have clearly confirmed his complete lack of susceptibility to National Socialist ideology. The works he produced in the immediate postwar period shed further clarifying light on this unusual path.

== Postwar period (1945–1955) ==
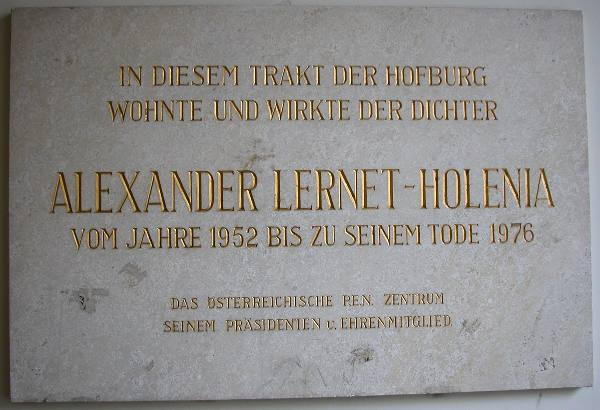
Historical marker, Hofburg Palace. "In this wing of the Hofburg the poet Alexander Lernet-Holenia lived and worked from 1952 until his death in 1976."

In the autumn of 1945, Lernet married Eva Vollbach in St. Wolfgang. In the early 1950s, the couple settled in Vienna in an apartment in the Hofburg, no less, placed at their disposal by a grateful Austrian government. Today, a commemorative plaque installed by the PEN Club indicates that he lived there from 1952 until his death.

Between 1939 and 1945, Lernet published nothing new – with the exception of Beide Sizilien – though he wrote extensively: poems, short prose texts, and the novel Der Graf von Saint-Germain. After the end of the war, he turned to Viennese publishers (Amandus Edition, Bellaria Verlag). Dissatisfied with the quality of their print work, he subsequently relied on Swiss publishers (Pegasus Verlag, Morgarten, Rascher), while also continuing to collaborate occasionally with S. Fischer. From 1955 onward, however, he entrusted his entire narrative output to Paul Zsolnay Verlag. In 1951, he was awarded the Literature Prize of the City of Vienna (Preis der Stadt Wien für Dichtkunst).

On the basis of a statement published at the end of 1945 in the Austrian journal Der Turm, an organ of Catholic conservatism, Lernet was often classified – without much differentiation – within the camp of cultural conservatism in the decades after the war:

Tr. "In truth, we need only continue where the dreams of a madman interrupted us; indeed, we need not look ahead, but only look back. […]. […] We are, in the best and most meaningful sense, our past; we need only remember that we are our past – and it will become our future."

The label "conservative" however does not do justice to the complexity of Lernet’s personality or worldview. During this period, he also sent texts to the communist journal Österreichisches Tagebuch as well as to the Arbeiter-Zeitung, the organ of the Austrian Social Democratic Party. He took part in the most pressing debates and controversies, commenting in particular on exile, on "inner emigration", and also opposing the atomic bomb – in formulations that have lost none of their relevance until today.

From 1954 to 1967, he also served as co-editor of the Austrian journal Forum, founded by Friedrich Torberg, an uncompromising anti-communist who, especially between 1956 and 1962, strongly advocated a boycott of Berthold Brecht’s plays on Viennese stages. However, this did not prevent Lernet from publishing, in 1956, immediately after the deaths of Benn and Brecht, an article in Forum in which he paid tribute to the poetic work of both – and united them in a form of praise very characteristic of him, in an article with the title: "Zwei deutsche Dichter (tr. Two German Poets)."

Yet perhaps even more than his intensive activity as an essayist and letter writer with a keen power of observation, it was the works produced between 1945 and 1955 that were of particular significance. As early as 1946, the elegy Germania attracted attention: Lernet, who rejected any form of amnesia that served political and cultural stabilization, was among the first to address the problem of collective responsibility for the horrors of National Socialism. He accused the Third Reich of having perverted even death itself, thereby blocking the cyclical course of history forever. Because of its form, the elegy Germania could mistakenly appear to some as addressing only the Germans. However, the novels Der Graf von Saint-Germain (1948) and Der Graf Luna (1955, tr. Count Luna) continued – against the prevailing current of the time – the confrontation with specifically Austrian individual and collective guilt for the crimes committed during National Socialism.

In Der Graf Luna (tr. Count Luna), the central figure is an Austrian nobleman whose "negligence" indirectly caused the death of a man in a concentration camp. Roček considers this novel to be Lernet’s most unsparing work on National Socialism. To grasp its significance, one must bear in mind that it was published in early April 1955 – one and a half months before the signing of the Austrian State Treaty (Staatsvertrag) in Vienna, which restored Austria’s sovereignty and established its neutrality. At that time, political authorities were striving to consolidate the political, social, and economic stability that had followed the moral and material hardships of the immediate postwar years. Der Graf Luna (tr. Count Luna), like Der Graf von Saint-Germain, ran counter to this "victim theory," which remained Austria’s official position until the 1980s.

In 1954, the then Austrian Minister of Education, Ernst Kolb, failed in his attempt to appoint Lernet as director of the Burgtheater. Public opposition to his appointment was fuelled by Lernet’s occasional contributions to the communist journal Wiener Tagebuch and by tax evasion proceedings that were brought against him at the time – though they ultimately came to nothing.

== The final years ==
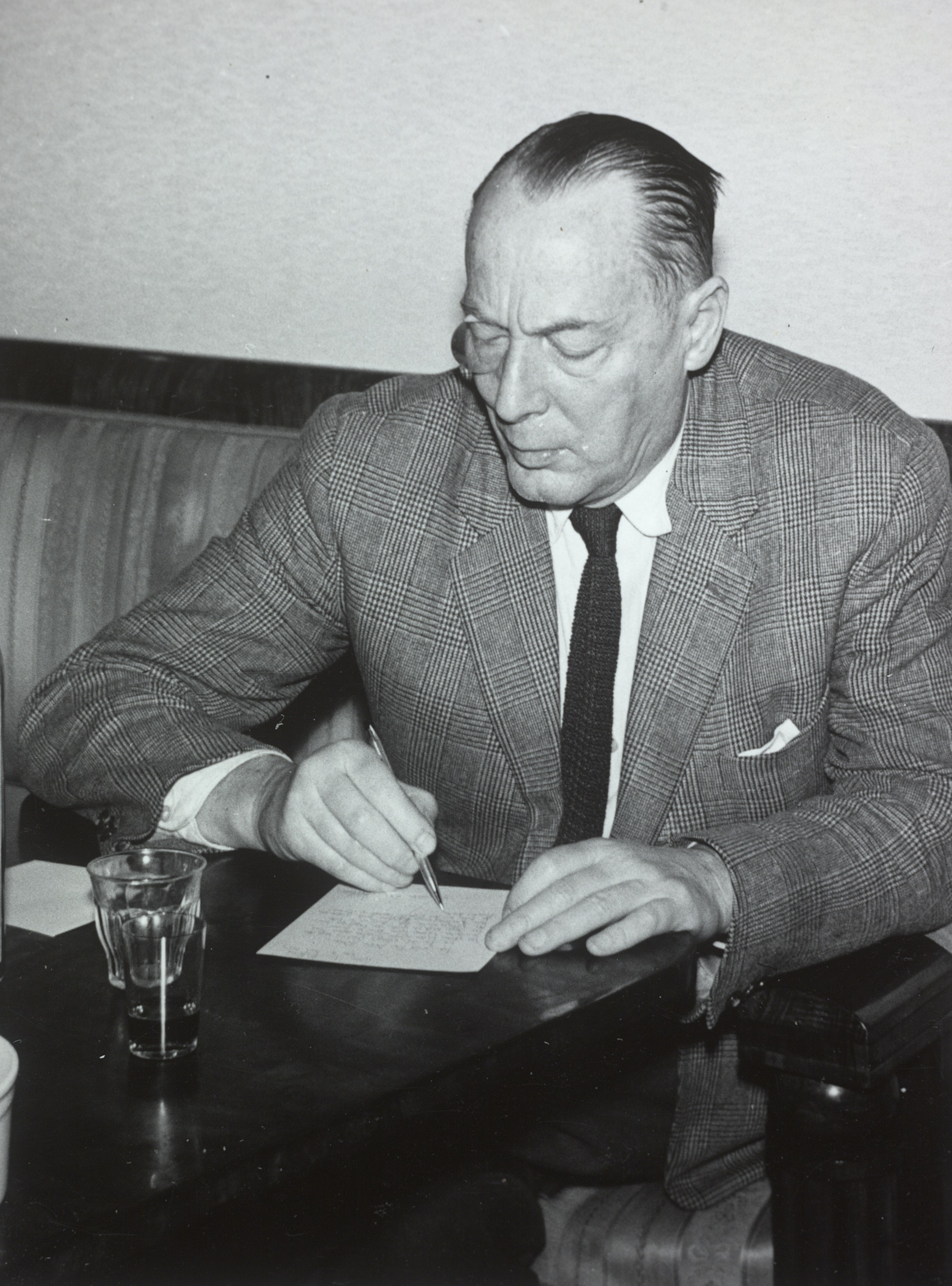
Alexander Lernet-Holenia on his desk in Vienna in the 1960s

Lernet’s literary productivity did not diminish – new novels, numerous short stories, as well as the biographies Prinz Eugen (1960) and Naundorff (1961) were published. Over more than a decade (1957–1968), he continued to receive numerous prizes and distinctions.

From the turn of the 1960s onward, however, reflections aimed at demonstrating the unworthiness of the last members of the Austrian imperial house increasingly intruded on his texts. The search for personal identity continually intermixed family genealogy with his country’s history. His genealogical obsessions began to strain the structure of his narratives, which were no longer able to integrate their constituent elements. Criticism, often unflattering, concluded that Lernet was parodying himself. At the same time, his public outbursts became more famous than his writings. Alongside cultivated politeness, the "grand seigneur of literature" was capable of memorable fits of rage. As a result, the press reported on him less in literary sections than in gossip columns and court reports. Lernet’s combative zeal was directed indiscriminately against administrative authorities, politicians, the press, and his peers in high society.

In politics as well, Lernet-Holenia resisted all labels: he supported the candidacy of the socialist Franz Jonas for the presidency, while at the same time attacking the Austrian Social Democratic Party in the columns of the Frankfurter Allgemeine Zeitung. At the official dinner party on October 23, 1972, marking Lernet’s 75th birthday, Bruno Kreisky delivered a revealing "tribute," in which he celebrated "the great writer, the great Austrian, and the strong personality whose views are often difficult to share." In January 1969, he reluctantly agreed to succeed Franz Theodor Csokor, who had just died, as head of the Austrian PEN Club.

On October 19, 1972, he resigned loudly from the leadership of the Austrian PEN Club and at the same time left the organization – protesting the awarding of the Nobel Prize in Literature to Heinrich Böll, then president of the International PEN Club, whom he accused of sympathizing with the Red Army Faction. Lernet told the press that he disapproved equally of the Nobel Committee’s decision and of Böll’s stance, which he believed had turned literary institutions into a political platform. Despite his break with the PEN Club, Lernet was readmitted in the summer of 1976, shortly before his death – this time as an honorary member.

Alexander Lernet-Holenia died in Vienna of lung cancer in Vienna on July 3, 1976. He is buried at Hietzing Cemetery, in an honorary grave of the City of Vienna (Group 30, No. 23).

== Reception ==
During his lifetime, Alexander Lernet-Holenia was highly controversial, not least because of his affinity for polemical commentary on contemporary affairs. Nevertheless, his works were widely read for their elegant style and exceptional narrative artistry. Stefan Zweig described Lernet-Holenia in a letter to the composer Richard Strauss as

Tr: "a mysterious figure as a writer, truly great in his poetry and in some of his dramatic scenes, yet at times unbelievably careless when, with his left hand and for the sake of making money, he writes comedies or light novels that have no depth at all, though they still possess grace. A collaboration with you, I thought, might spur him to the highest productivity, for when the fire within him is awakened, he is, in my view, more magnificent than all the others."

In more recent times, the motifs and fantastical elements of Alexander Lernet-Holenia’s works have also come into focus in Literary Studies. The following review by Patti Smith is representative of more recent reception history:

"Baron Bagge by the Viennese poet and novelist Alexander Lernet-Holenia – a slim manuscript printed on slightly discoloured paper, holding a vague scent of black tea. I know little of the author save that he had served in World War I as a lieutenant in the Austrian Army and was a protégé of the poet Rilke. But I had read his Count Luna – a book so astonishing that I immediately reread it, fearful it might disappear – and I had fleetingly wondered whether Lernet-Holenia could marshal such accelerated powers of imagination in another work. What foolish qualms. Great writers harbor reserves as rich and varied as the caves of Ali Baba. If Count Luna might be called a perfectly chatoyant moonstone, surely the work before me would prove to be yet another unimaginable gem. For a poet gives us a verse of unspeakable beauty, only to eclipse it with another, or produce several more in swift succession to form a transporting constellation."

== Honors and posthumous recognition ==
- Kleist Prize (1926)
- Goethe Prize of the city of Bremen (1927)
- City of Vienna Prize for Literature (1951)
- Great Cross of Merit of the Federal Republic of Germany (Großes Verdienstkreuz) (1958)
- Grand Austrian State Prize for Literature (1961)
- Gold Medal of the capital Vienna (1967)
- Austrian Decoration for Science and Art (1968)
- A park in Vienna's Hernals district was named after Lernet-Holenia on 24 September 1999.
- The International Alexander Lernet-Holenia Society (Internationale Alexander Lernent-Holenia Gesellschaft), founded in Vienna in 1998, promotes the study, translation and publication of the author's works. Italian writer Roberto Calasso, a Franz Kafka scholar whose own writings reference Central European identity themes and tensions, served at the Society's president.

== Works in English translation ==
- 1933: A Young Gentleman in Poland (Die Abenteuer eines jungen Herrn in Polen – novel), translator: Alan Harris, Duckworth, London
- 1936: The Standard (Die Standarte, novel), translator: Alan Harris, William Heinemann Ltd, London-Toronto
- 1936: The Glory is Departed (Die Standarte, novel), translator: Alan Harris, Harper & Brothers Publishers, New York-London
- 1955: Mona Lisa (Mona Lisa, novella), in German Stories and Tales, translator: Jane B. Greene, Pocket Books, Inc., New York
- 1956: Count Luna (Der Graf Luna, novel) & Baron Bagge (Der Baron Bagge, novella). Two Tales of the real and the unreal, Translators: Richard & Clara Winston (Baron Bagge), translators: Jane B. Greene (Count Luna). Introduction: Robert Pick, Criterion Books, Inc. New York
- 1988: The Resurrection of Maltravers (Die Auferstehung des Maltravers, novel), translator: Joachim Neugroschel, Eridanos Press, Colorado
- 1991: "The Man in the Hat" (Der Mann im Hut, abstract, novel), In: Relationships: An anthology of contemporary Austrian prose, translator: Heidi Hutschinson, Ariadne Press, Riverside California
- 1997: "Hitler's origins" (Hitlers Herkunft, essay), translator: Thomas G. Ringmayr, Southern Humanities Review,Volume 31, Auburn University, Auburn Alabama
- 2000: "To the Moon" (An den Mond, poetry), Arthur's death (Der Tod Arthurs, poetry). translator: Johannes Beilharz
- 2000: "Aristocracy and Society in Austria" (Adel und Gesellschaft in Österreich, essay), translator: Thomas Ringmayr, Southern Humanities Review, Volume 34, Auburn University, Alabama
- 2002: Mars in Aries (Mars im Widder, abstract, novel) In: German Writings Before and After 1945, translator: Lance W. Garmer and Josephine R. Garmer, The German Library, Bloomsbury Publishing, London
- 2003: Mars in Aries (Mars im Widder, novel), translator: Robert von Dassanowsky & Elisabeth Littell Frech, Afterword: Robert von Dassanowsky, Ariadne Press, Riverside, California
- 2004: "The Three Kings of Totenleben" (Die Heiligen Drei Könige von Totenleben, short story), translator: John S. Barrett, Southern Humanities Review, Volume 38, Auburn University, Auburn Alabama
- 2005: "Manzoni and Christianity" (Manzoni und das Christentum, essay) translator: John S. Barrett, Southern Humanities Review, Vol. 39, Nr. 2, Auburn University, Alabama
- 2013: I Was Jack Mortimer (Ich war Jack Mortimer), translator: Ignat Avsey, Pushkin Press, London
- 2015: Mona Lisa (Mona Lisa, novella), translator: Ignat Avsey, Pushkin Press, London
- 2025: Mars in Aries (Mars im Widder, novel), translators: Robert von Dassanowsky & John S. Barrett, Penguin Classics

== Filmography ==
=== Literary source ===
- Abenteuer eines jungen Herrn in Polen, directed by Gustav Fröhlich with Ernst Stahl-Nachbaur, (1934, based on the novel A Young Gentleman in Poland)
- My Life for Maria Isabella, directed by Erich Waschneck with Viktor de Kowa and Maria Andergast, (1935, based on the novel The Standard)
- I Was Jack Mortimer, directed by Carl Froelich with Anton Walbrook and Marieluise Claudius, (1935, based on the novel I Was Jack Mortimer)
- Maresi, directed by Hans Thimig with Attila Hörbiger and Maria Schell, (1948, based on the short story Maresi)
- The Other Life, directed by Rudolf Steinboeck with Aglaja Schmid, Robert Lindner and Vilma Degischer, (1949, based on the novella Twentieth of July)
- Escándalo nocturno, directed by Juan Carlos Thorry with Elina Colomer, José Cibrián and Alita Román (Argentina, 1951, based on the play Tohuwabohu)
- Adventure in Vienna, directed by Emil-Edwin Reinert script: Michael Kehlmann with Gustav Fröhlich and Cornell Borchers, (1952, based on the novel I Was Jack Mortimer)
- Stolen Identity, directed by Gunther von Fritsch with Donald Buka and Francis Lederer (1953, based on the novel I Was Jack Mortimer)
- Land, das meine Sprache spricht, directed by Michael Kehlmann with Alexander Kerst, (1959, TV film, based on the novella Twentieth of July)
- Jack Mortimer, directed by Michael Kehlmann with Ingrid van Bergen (1961, TV film, based on the novel I Was Jack Mortimer)
- À la guerre comme à la guerre, directed by Bernard Borderie with Curd Jürgens and Leonard Whiting, (1972, based on the novel A Young Gentleman in Poland)
- The Standard, directed by Ottokar Runze with Curd Jürgens and Leonard Whiting, (1977, based on the novel The Standard)
- Land, das meine Sprache spricht, directed by Michael Kehlmann with Volkert Kraeft and Guido Wieland (1980, TV film, based on the novella Twentieth of July)

=== Screenwriter ===
- The Great Love (1942) (directed by Rolf Hansen, written by: Rolf Hansen & Peter Groll based on a concept by Alexander Lernet-Holenia)
- Die Entlassung (1942) (directed by Wolfgang Liebeneiner, written by: Alexander Lernet-Holenia (story), Curt J. Braun & Felix von Eckardt)
- On Resonant Shores (1948) (directed by Hans Unterkircher, written by: Alexander Lernet-Holenia)
- Espionage (1955) (directed by Franz Antel, written by: Alexander Lernet-Holenia & Kurt Nachmann)

== See also ==
- List of Austrian writers
