= Manfred Inger =

Austrian actor

- Born: 1 January 1907; Vienna, Austro-Hungarian Empire
- Died: 25 July 1984 (aged 77); Vienna, Austria
- Occupation: Actor
- Years active: 1949-1984 (film & TV)

Manfred Inger (1 January 1907 – 25 July 1984) was an Austrian stage, film and television actor.

== Filmography ==
Year	Title	Role	Notes
1948	Caught	Mr. Rudetzki	Uncredited
1949	The Great Sinner	Conductor	Uncredited
1950	Cordula		
1951	The Magic Face	Heinrich Wagner	
1952	Adventure in Vienna	Polizeiinspektor	
1952	No Time for Flowers	Kudelka	
1953	Stolen Identity	Inspector	
1954	The House on the Coast	Vjeko	
1955	Du bist die Richtige	Chauffeur	
1956	The Bath in the Barn	Jan, Amtsdiener	
1956	My Father, the Actor	Le Beq, Regisseur	
1958	Arms and the Man	Nicola	
1959	For the First Time	Servant at the Vienna State Opera	Uncredited

== Bibliography ==
- Greco, Joseph. The File on Robert Siodmak in Hollywood, 1941-1951. Universal-Publishers, 1999. ISBN 978-1-58112-081-3.
