= Twentieth of July =

Austrian novella

- Author: Alexander Lernet-Holenia
- Language: German
- Genre: Drama
- Publication date: 1947
- Publication place: Austria
- Media type: Print

Twentieth of July (German: Der Zwanzigiste Juli) is a 1947 novella by the Austrian writer Alexander Lernet-Holenia. During the Nazi era an aristocratic Austria woman lends her papers to a Jewish acquaintance, only to find herself without an identity when the woman dies.

In 1948 it was adapted into a film The Other Life starring Aglaja Schmid, Robert Lindner and Gustav Waldau.

== Bibliography ==
- Robert von Dassanowsky. Austrian Cinema: A History. McFarland, 2005.
