= Peter Wehle =

- Born: 9 May 1914; Vienna, Austro-Hungarian Empire
- Died: 18 May 1986 (aged 72); Vienna, Austria
- Occupation(s): Writer, actor, composer

Peter Wehle (9 May 1914 – 18 May 1986) was an Austrian actor, writer, composer and cabaret performer.

== Selected filmography ==
- The Singing House (198)
- Dear Friend (1949)
- Mikosch, the Pride of the Company (1958)

== Bibliography ==
- Robert von Dassanowsky. Austrian Cinema: A History. McFarland, 2005.
