= Nina Sandt =

German actress (1928–2003)

- Born: 8 July 1928; Berlin, Germany
- Died: April 2003 (aged 74); Vienna, Austria
- Other name: Nina Dürer
- Occupation: Actress
- Years active: 1950–1986 (film & TV)

Nina Sandt (1928–2003) was a German stage, film and television actress.

== Selected filmography ==
- Cordula (1950)
- Maria Theresa (1951)
- Where the Lark Sings (1956)
- Scandal in Bad Ischl (1957)
- Trees Are Blooming in Vienna (1958)

== Bibliography ==
- Popa, Dorin. O.W. Fischer: seine Filme, sein Leben. Wilhelm Heyne, 1989.
