= Leopold Rudolf =

Austrian actor

- Born: 3 May 1911; Vienna, Austro-Hungarian Empire
- Died: 4 June 1978 (aged 67); Vienna, Austria
- Occupation: Actor
- Years active: 1948–1977 (film & TV)

Leopold Rudolf (3 May 1911 – 4 June 1978) was an Austrian stage, film and television actor.

== Selected filmography ==
- After the Storm (1948)
- The Other Life (1948)
- Lambert Feels Threatened (1949)
- Cordula (1950)
- The Fourth Commandment (1950)
- Archduke Johann's Great Love (1950)
- Maria Theresa (1951)
- Vienna Waltzes (1951)
- 1. April 2000 (1952)
- The Last Reserves (1953)
- The Witch (1954)
- Mozart (1955)
- The Long Day of Inspector Blomfield (1968)

== Bibliography ==
- Fritsche, Maria. Homemade Men In Postwar Austrian Cinema: Nationhood, Genre and Masculinity. Berghahn Books, 2013.
