= Karl Günther =

Austrian actor (1885–1951)

Karl Günther (25 November 1885 – 27 June 1951) was an Austrian film actor.

== Selected filmography ==
- The Masked Ones (1920)
- The Riddle of the Sphinx (1921)
- The Adventuress of Monte Carlo (1921)
- The Call of Destiny (1922)
- Your Valet (1922)
- Modern Vices (1924)
- The Queen of Moulin Rouge (1926)
- The Yellow House of Rio (1931)
- Lady Windermere's Fan (1935)
- Court Theatre (1936)
- Alarm in Peking (1937)
- Premiere (1937)
- The Charm of La Boheme (1937)
- A Prussian Love Story (1938)
- The Roundabouts of Handsome Karl (1938)
- Triad (1938)
- Secret Code LB 17 (1938)
- Maria Ilona (1939)
- The Desert Song (1939)
- Hotel Sacher (1939)
- Stern von Rio (1940)
- Women Are Better Diplomats (1941)
- The Way to Freedom (1941)
- The Waitress Anna (1941)
- Der große König (1942)
- Andreas Schlüter (1942)
- A Man With Principles? (1943)
- The Big Number (1943)
- Romance in a Minor Key (1943)
- The Second Shot (1943)
- The War of the Oxen (1943)
- Germanin (1943)
- Nora (1944)
- Dog Days (1944)
- The Roedern Affair (1944)
- The Queen of the Landstrasse (1948)
- The Heavenly Waltz (1948)
- The Other Life (1948)
- The Angel with the Trumpet (1948)
- White Gold (1949)
- Dear Friend (1949)
- Eroica (1949)
- Cordula (1950)
- Bonus on Death (1950)

== Bibliography ==
- Bergfelder, Tim & Bock, Hans-Michael. The Concise Cinegraph: Encyclopedia of German. Berghahn Books, 2009.
