= Fred Hennings =

Austrian actor

- Born: 26 January 1895; Klagenfurt, Carinthia, Austro-Hungarian Empire
- Died: 22 November 1981 (aged 86); Vienna, Austria
- Other name: Franz von Papen-Pawlowski
- Occupation: Actor
- Years active: 1923-1964 (film)

Fred Hennings (1895–1981) was an Austrian stage and film actor. Although active primarily in the theatre, he appeared in supporting roles in a number of films over the decades. A committed Nazi, he had joined the Austrian Nazi Party in the early 1930s, when it was then illegal. In 1977 he was awarded the Ring of Honour of the City of Vienna.

== Selected filmography ==
- The Portrait (1923)
- Play Around a Man (1929)
- At Blonde Kathrein's Place (1934)
- Harvest 1936)
- Silhouettes (1936)
- Cordula (1950)
- 1. April 2000 (1952)
- Franz Schubert (1953)
- The Spendthrift (1953)
- Don Juan (1955)
- Mozart (1955)
- Goetz von Berlichingen (1955)
- The Vulture Wally (1956)
- Vienna, City of My Dreams (1957)
- The Spendthrift (1964)

== Bibliography ==
- Von Dassanowsky, Robert. Screening Transcendence: Film Under Austrofascism and the Hollywood Hope, 1933-1938. Indiana University Press, 2018
- Weyr, Thomas . The Setting of the Pearl: Vienna under Hitler. Oxford University Press, 2005.
