= Adventure in Vienna =

- Directed by: Emil E. Reinert
- Written by: Michael Kehlmann; Franz Tassié
- Based on: I Was Jack Mortimer by Alexander Lernet-Holenia
- Produced by: Ernst Müller
- Starring: Gustav Fröhlich; Cornell Borchers; Adrienne Gessner
- Cinematography: Helmut Ashley
- Edited by: Henny Brünsch
- Music by: Richard Hageman
- Production companies: Schönbrunn-Film; Transglobe-Film
- Distributed by: Herzog Film
- Release date: 18 September 1952
- Running time: 89 minutes
- Country: Austria
- Language: German

Adventure in Vienna (German: Abenteuer in Wien) is a 1952 Austrian crime thriller film directed by Emil E. Reinert and starring Gustav Fröhlich, Cornell Borchers and Adrienne Gessner. It is an adaptation of the 1933 novel I Was Jack Mortimer by Alexander Lernet-Holenia. A separate English-language version Stolen Identity was also produced.

The film's sets were designed by the art directors Fritz Jüptner-Jonstorff and Fritz Moegle. It was shot at the Schönbrunn Studios in Vienna and on location across the city. The costumes were designed by Nadja Tiller, who subsequently went on to become a famous actress.

== Synopsis ==
The story takes place over New Year's Eve in Vienna where a taxi driver without papers is tempted to assume the identity of another man.

== Cast ==
- Gustav Fröhlich as Toni Sponer
- Cornell Borchers as Karin Manelli
- Francis Lederer as Claude Manelli
- Inge Konradi as Marie
- Hermann Erhardt as Ferdl Heintl
- Adrienne Gessner as Frau Anna Fraser
- Egon von Jordan as Krüger
- Manfred Inger as Polizeiinspektor
- Fritz Eckhardt as Portier im Goldenen Löwen
- Alexander Kerst as 2.Polizist auf der Wache
- Trude Marlen as Ehefrau auf dem Kommissariat
- Karl Schwetter as Ehemann auf dem Kommissariat
- Michael Kehlmann as Passfälscher
- Franz Marischka as Passkontrolleur am Flughafen
- Wolfgang Glück as Porschefahrer
- Gerda Neubauer as Frau im Porsche
- Karl Farkas as Ober in der Bar
- Guido Wieland as 'Geldeintreiber' vom Goldenen Löwen
- Gisela Wilke as Alte Frau im Kaiserpanorama
- Fred Solm as 1.Polizist auf der Wache
- Louis Ousted as John Milton
- Paul Pranger as Portier im Goldenen Löwen
- Reinhold Siegert as Mann bei der Telefonzelle
- Helmut Janatsch as Polizist bei der Hausdurchsuchung
- Fritz Krenn as Mann an der Lufthafenauskunft
- Maria Gerngroß as Stewardess
- Pepi Glöckner-Kramer as Alte Frau im Kaiserpanorama
- Franz Böheim as Betrunkener mit Luftballon
- Rosa Albach-Retty
- Ulrich Bettac
- Heinz Conrads
- Hugo Gottschlich
- Hans Hagen as Dirigent
- Dorothea Neff
- Milan von Kamare
- Ernst Waldbrunn

== See also ==
- I Was Jack Mortimer (1935)

== Bibliography ==
- Fritsche, Maria. Homemade Men in Postwar Austrian Cinema: Nationhood, Genre and Masculinity. Berghahn Books, 2013.
