= Mozart (1955 film) =

1955 film

- Directed by: Karl Hartl
- Written by: Karl Hartl; Egon Komorzynski; Franz Tassié
- Produced by: J. W. Beyer; Julius Jonak; A. I. Paulini
- Starring: Oskar Werner; Johanna Matz; Gertrud Kückelmann
- Cinematography: Oskar Schnirch
- Edited by: Henny Brünsch
- Music by: Hans Swarowsky
- Production company: Cosmopol-Film
- Distributed by: Cosmopol-Film; Columbia Film
- Release date: 20 December 1955
- Running time: 100 minutes
- Country: Austria
- Language: German

Mozart is a 1955 Austrian drama film directed by Karl Hartl and starring Oskar Werner, Johanna Matz and Gertrud Kückelmann. It is also known by the alternative title The Life and Loves of Mozart. It was entered into the 1956 Cannes Film Festival. The plot explores the mental state of Mozart during production of his final opera The Magic Flute. Werner's portrayal of Mozart was unusual for the time in playing him as a cheerful and easygoing young man, reflecting the postwar optimism of the newly restored Austrian Republic. It was shot at the Ring-Film Studios in Vienna. The film's sets were designed by the art directors Werner Schlichting and Wolf Witzemann.

== Cast ==
- Oskar Werner as Wolfgang Amadeus Mozart
- Johanna Matz as Annie Gottlieb
- Erich Kunz as Emanuel Schikaneder
- Gertrud Kückelmann as Constanze Mozart
- Nadja Tiller as Louise Weber Lange
- Annie Rosar as Frau Weber
- Hugo Gottschlich as Don Primus
- Angelika Hauff as Suzi Gerl
- Albin Skoda as Antonio Salieri, village composer
- Raoul Aslan as Rosenberg, Hofkämmerer
- Walter Regelsberger as Süßmayer, Mazart's Famulus
- Elfie Weissenböck as Josefa Hofer - Queen of the Night
- Alma Seidler as Gottlieb's mother
- Ulrich Bettac as Gottlieb's father
- Leopold Rudolf as an unknown person, orderer of the Requiem
- Helli Servi as Lina, Mozart's servant
- Raoul Retzer as Gerl, Sarasto's actor
- Elisabeth Terval as Eleonore Gottlieb
- Egon von Jordan as Bondini, ital. Impresario
- Fred Hennings as Van Swieten
- Franz Böheim as stage manager of the theatre
- Peter Brand as Schack, Taminos' actor
- Karl Eidlitz as Hoffmeister, Musikallienhändler
- Karl Skraup as Valentin

== Bibliography ==
- Mitchell, Charles P. (8 April 2010). The Great Composers Portrayed on Film, 1913 through 2002. Jefferson (N.C.): McFarland. ISBN 978-0-7864-4586-8.
