= Telerop 2009 – Es ist noch was zu retten =

- Genre: Science fiction
- Written by: Jürgen Voigt, Karl Wittlinger
- Country of origin: West Germany
- No. of seasons: 1
- No. of episodes: 13

Production
- Running time: 25 minutes

Original release
- Release: July 10, 1974

Telerop 2009 – Es ist noch was zu retten ("Telerop 2009: There is still something to be saved") is a German science fiction television series. It was created under the direction of Eberhard Itzenplitz and Michael Kehlmann and first aired on 10 July 1974 on ARD.

The series portrays a dark future for 2009. As a result of environmental pollution during the 1970s and 1980s the natural environment is largely destroyed. For instance the use of pesticides killed off plants with only insects surviving, smog is a permanent problem, Germany partly turned to a steppe landscape and the share of oxygen in the air fell to 16%. Telerop is a television channel which reports from this disaster zone of Germany.

== See also ==
- List of German television series
