= I Was Jack Mortimer (novel) =

1933 novel by Alexander Lernet-Holenia

- 1952 edition (publ. Fischer Bücherei)
- Author: Alexander Lernet-Holenia
- Language: German
- Genre: Thriller
- Publication date: 1933
- Publication place: Austria
- Media type: Print

I Was Jack Mortimer (German: Ich war Jack Mortimer) is a 1933 thriller novel by the Austrian writer Alexander Lernet-Holenia. It is a story about murder and mistaken identities surrounding a taxi driver in Vienna.

In 1935 it was adapted into a German film of the same title directed by Carl Froelich and starring Anton Walbrook and Sybille Schmitz. In 1952 it was adapted into the Austrian film Adventure in Vienna directed by Emil E. Reinert and starring Gustav Fröhlich and Cornell Borchers. A separate English-language version, Stolen Identity (1953), was also produced. The West German television film Jack Mortimer (1961) was directed by Michael Kehlmann.

== Bibliography ==
- Goble, Alan. The Complete Index to Literary Sources in Film. Walter de Gruyter, 1999.
