= Mars in Aries =

Novel by Alexander Lernet-Holenia

First distributed edition (1947)

Mars in Aries (a literal translation of the German original title, Mars im Widder) is the most widely known novel by the Austrian writer Alexander Lernet-Holenia. It was written during the winter of 1939–1940 and is about the author's combat experience during the invasion of Poland by the German Wehrmacht at the start of World War II. The novel draws its disturbing quality from an intimate interlacing of precisely described authentic combat episodes with a concept of a pervasive Otherworld that merges with our reality in a way that makes it difficult to determine whether one has already transgressed its borders. It stands in the tradition of the early 20th-century Austrian psychological novel genre of which Arthur Schnitzler's Dream Story and Leo Perutz' The Master of the Day of Judgement are other famous examples. Mars in Aries was recognised as a Penguin Modern Classic with a 2025 edition.

== Plot summary ==
As Count Wallmoden, an Austrian World War I veteran and lieutenant of the reserve, readies himself for a four-week military exercise which is scheduled to start on August 15, 1939, he experiences the first of several derealization episodes. Later, during an idle evening spent in talk with his fellow officers, as the discussion touches on the topic of spiritism, his regimental commander half-jokingly promises Wallmoden that whenever they meet he would indicate whether he is still alive or already dead because that might not be immediately apparent to a living person. During a training attack near the village of Würmla Wallmoden has an apparition of naked ghosts swirling around him. He keeps this vision to himself until much later when he reports it to a military physician, who tells him that there is nothing necessarily wrong with him, as hallucinations in the sane are not uncommon as most people believe.

While spending an off-duty evening in Vienna Wallmoden socially meets people who, as it eventually turns out, are not quite what they seem and might in fact be members of the Austrian resistance. Among them is a strange aristocratic lady, Baroness Pistohlkors, who states that she is German by birth but lived in Sioux Falls as a child before coming to Austria. The two start an affair. Wallmoden promises to meet her again on September 16, the day his tour of military duty is over.

Later, returning from another visit to Vienna, Wallmoden finds that his unit has been mobilized for war. Motorized night marches take them through Jedenspeigen (where Walmoden has a lucid dream of two young women bathing in the room he is sleeping in) and across Slovakia (at this time, a Nazi puppet state) to Trstená at the Slovak-Polish border. As the regiment prepares to attack Jabłonka at first morning light he witnesses an eastward migration of thousands of crabs, a phenomenon apparently not perceived or ignored by his comrades—and clearly a symbol for the German war machine.

As Wallmoden's regiment approaches Hrubieszów by way of Tarnów on September 16, the invaders face the first serious Polish resistance. A fellow officer who had supposedly visited Baroness Pistohlkors in Vienna admits that he had deceived Wallmoden when he had conveyed her greetings to him earlier; actually his beloved died resisting apprehension by the Gestapo. On a country road he meets his regimental commander who—in keeping with his promise—had stated on all earlier occasions that he was "still in the flesh" but now almost proudly announces that "his status has changed." When the junior officer remarks that such a joke is in bad taste given the considerable number of recent casualties, the colonel angrily orders Wallmoden to stand aside near a group of trees. As Wallmoden complies he sees the corpse of his regimental commander being carried away.

Before he can come to terms with the fact that he has talked to a ghost a minute ago, Polish aircraft appear and drop bombs on the grove Wallmoden had been ordered to by his dead commander. As he is hurled through the air by one of the explosions he briefly enters a dreamlike state from which he (apparently at least) awakes to find himself being transported in an ambulance car, although he does not seem to have suffered injuries.

In Janówka their car breaks down and Wallmoden strays into a villa where he meets a woman whom he recognizes as his beloved although there is no outward resemblance. After they have had sex she identifies herself as the true baroness Pistohlkors who had become a victim of identity theft after her passport had been stolen. As the two make their way back towards Germany the story terminates, without explicit ending, as they pass Niwiska. It is not clear whether the two continue on the factual plane of the story as living beings, or rather have rejoined in the Otherworld.

== Publishing history ==
The Berlin illustrated women's magazine Die Dame first published the novel as a serial entitled Die Blaue Stunde (The Blue Hour) in 1941 while the book version, with the definitive title Mars im Widder, was produced by the S. Fischer Verlag. However, the Nazi Ministry of Public Enlightenment and Propaganda frowned upon the story (which lacks all celebration of "Germanic heroism" in spite of its extensive illustrations of the total Polish defeat, and hints at anti-Nazi resistance) and refused the publishing permit. The 15,000 copies of the book were put in storage in Leipzig, where they were destroyed during the Allied air raids of 1943 and 1944. The novel was later reprinted from proofs which the author had preserved throughout the war, with the first distributed German edition dating from 1947.

An English translation was published in July 2003.
