= Baron Bagge =

1936 novella by Alexander Lernet-Holenia

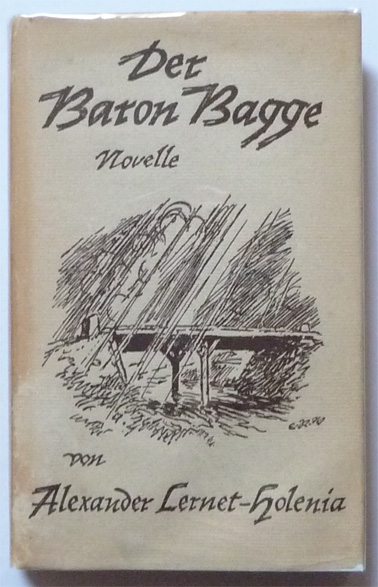
- Author: Alexander Lernet-Holenia
- Original title: Der Baron Bagge
- Translator: Richard and Clara Winston
- Language: German
- Published: 1936
- Publisher: S. Fischer Verlag
- Publication place: Austria
- English publication date: 1956

Baron Bagge (German: Der Baron Bagge) is a novella by the Austrian author Alexander Lernet-Holenia, originally published in German in 1936 by S. Fischer Verlag. Set during World War I, it deals with a cavalry officer's ride through the Carpathian Mountains that turns more and more unreal as he encounters love, death and war. The first English translation by Richard and Clara Winston was published in 1956.

== Plot ==
At an official reception in Vienna, there is a dispute between Baron Bagge and a young man, Farago, who forbids Bagge to speak with his sister. Bagge, Farago claims, was responsible for the suicides of two women. Bagge challenges him to a duel, but the situation can be cleared and Farago agrees to apologize. Bagge finds he has to explain himself and tells his story. Both women did indeed kill themselves, because he would marry neither of them. This was, Bagge says, because he was actually already married.

He was a cavalry officer back in 1915 and found himself with his unit on a reconnaissance mission in the buildup to the Gorlice–Tarnów Offensive in Eastern Europe. His mentally unstable commanding officer, Rittmeister Semler, orders an attack on a bridge held by Imperial Russian Army. Even though cavalry normally wouldn't stand a chance against machine-guns, the charge miraculously succeeds with minimal casualties. Bagge is only hit by a small rock that is swirled up during the attack. Afterwards, the reconnaissance unit advances further into what nominally must be enemy-held territory, but finds only peace and a welcoming civilian population. At the Ukrainian town of Nagy-Mihaly (nowadays called Michalovce), Bagge meets Charlotte Szent-Kiraly, the daughter of a friend of his late mother's, and immediately falls in love with her. Her beauty as well as her confidence deeply impress Bagge. Rittmeister Semler tries frantically to find the enemy and orders his unit to leave the town. Bagge resolves to marry Charlotte and proposes to her. He says that he will come back as soon as possible, but she, although agreeing to marry him, tells him that she is sure that he would never return.

From there on, the cavalry unit rides on for five more days until they get to a river where they see a bridge made of pure gold. Most of the soldiers cross the bridge but Bagge refuses, finally convincing himself that this could not be real. Then he awakes. He is still at the first bridge, where the attack was catastrophic and he has actually been hit by a bullet, not just a small rock. He is transported to a field hospital and slowly recovers. He realises that the peaceful land, the town of Nagy-Mihaly and his marriage to Charlotte occurred only in a dream.

After the war, he travels back and finds the land looking strangely similar to his dream. There was even a real Charlotte in Nagy-Mihaly, but she died during the war. All those he saw in his dream were already dead, including Semler and his fellow soldiers. He even encounters the bridge from his dream, which is not made of gold but a simple wooden bridge. Bagge however, still does not dare to cross the bridge. He interprets his experiences through Norse mythology.

== Reception ==
Widely regarded as Lernet-Holenias finest work, Baron Bagge has a narrative structure similar to the Civil War story An Occurrence at Owl Creek Bridge by Ambrose Bierce, even sharing the symbol of the bridge as border between life and death.

The book was lauded by, among others, the Argentine writer Jorge Luis Borges.

Phyllis Rose described the setting as "a world not quite real, unfamiliar yet believable" and complimented the "mesmerizing storytelling".
