= Maresi =

1948 film

- Directed by: Hans Thimig
- Written by: Alexander Lernet-Holenia (novel); Peter Francke; Kurt Heuser
- Produced by: Anton Profes
- Starring: Attila Hörbiger; Maria Schell; Siegfried Breuer
- Cinematography: Oskar Schnirch
- Edited by: Henny Brünsch
- Music by: Anton Profes
- Production company: Unitas Film
- Distributed by: Sascha-Film; Herzog Filmverleih (Germany)
- Release date: 5 November 1948
- Running time: 86 minutes
- Country: Austria
- Language: German

Maresi is a 1948 Austrian period drama film directed by Hans Thimig and starring Attila Hörbiger, Maria Schell and Siegfried Breuer. It was one of the box offices successes of 1948. The film was based on the 1935 story of the same title by the Austrian writer Alexander Lernet-Holenia (1897 - 1976). The film's sets were designed by the art director Julius von Borsody.

== Cast ==
- Attila Hörbiger as Franz von Hübner
- Maria Schell as Blanka von Steinville
- Siegfried Breuer as Tabakovitsch
- Helene Croy as Frau von Hübner
- Franz Pfaudler as Graf Steinville
- Maria Olszewska as Gräfin Steinville
- Alfred Neugebauer as Erzherzog Franz Ferdinand
- Anton Pointner as Der Oberst
- Georg Tressler as Der Richter
- Josef Albin as Kriminalinspektor Weniger
- Camillo Kossuth as Der Diener Ferdinand
- Max Schipper as Der Reitbursche Johann
- Gretl Müller-Morelli as Madame Elektra
- Hugo Lindinger as Ein dicker Fleischhauer
- Eduard Loibner as Matthias Loy - ein Kutscher
- Franz Muxeneder as Hausdiener bei Franz von Hübner

== Bibliography ==
- Fritsche, Maria. Homemade Men in Postwar Austrian Cinema: Nationhood, Genre and Masculinity. Berghahn Books, 2013.
- Von Dassanowsky, Robert. Austrian Cinema: A History. McFarland, 2005.
