= Erik Frey =

Austrian actor

- Born: 1 March 1908; Vienna, Austria-Hungary
- Died: 2 September 1988 (aged 80); Vienna, Austria
- Occupation: Actor
- Years active: 1936–1988

Erik Frey (1 March 1908 – 2 September 1988) was an Austrian film actor. He appeared in more than 110 films between 1936 and 1988. He was born and died in Vienna, Austria. He was married to the actress Jane Tilden and Susi Witt.

== Selected filmography ==
- Court Theatre (1936)
- Judgement Day (1940)
- Love is Duty Free (1941)
- Thrice Wed (1941)
- Late Love (1943)
- The Heart Must Be Silent (1944)
- Viennese Girls (1945)
- The Immortal Face (1947)
- The Other Life (1948)
- Eroica (1949)
- Dear Friend (1949)
- Vagabonds (1949)
- Cordula (1950)
- The Fourth Commandment (1950)
- Vienna Waltzes (1951)
- City Park (1951)
- Maria Theresa (1951)
- 1. April 2000 (1952)
- If I Only Have Your Love (1953)
- On the Green Meadow (1953)
- The Immortal Vagabond (1953)
- The Emperor Waltz (1953)
- The Eternal Waltz (1954)
- The Forester of the Silver Wood (1954)
- Sarajevo (1955)
- The Doctor's Secret (1955)
- Crown Prince Rudolph's Last Love (1955)
- Ludwig II (1955)
- The Last Ten Days (1955)
- Espionage (1955)
- His Daughter is Called Peter (1955)
- Through the Forests and Through the Trees (1956)
- Forest Liesel (1956)
- The Unexcused Hour (1957)
- Night Nurse Ingeborg (1958)
- One Should Be Twenty Again (1958)
- Jacqueline (1959)
- Man in the Shadows (1961)
- The Reverend Turns a Blind Eye (1971)
- The Standard (1977)
- Goetz von Berlichingen of the Iron Hand (1979)
