= Hula-Hopp, Conny =

1959 film

- Directed by: Heinz Paul
- Written by: Fritz Böttger; Heinz Paul; Per Schwenzen
- Produced by: Heinz Paul; Christoph von Mitschke-Collande
- Starring: Cornelia Froboess; Rudolf Vogel; Susi Nicoletti
- Cinematography: Erich Claunigk
- Edited by: Karl Aulitzky
- Music by: Charly Niessen; Peter Ström
- Production company: H.P. Filmproduktion
- Distributed by: Union-Film
- Release date: 5 March 1959
- Running time: 97 minutes
- Country: West Germany
- Language: German

Hula-Hopp, Conny is a 1959 West German musical comedy film directed by Heinz Paul and starring Cornelia Froboess, Rudolf Vogel and Susi Nicoletti. It was shot at the Bavaria Studios in Munich. The film's sets were designed by the art directors Hans Ledersteger and Herbert Ploberger. On a not so light note, the movie holds the distinction of highlighting a 1957 BMW 507 which had belonged to German car racer Hans Stuck, and then to Elvis Presley and whose cost in 2026 was estimated at $18m., in fact the most valuable BMW unit ever built since the brand's creation in the early 20th Century.

== Cast ==
- Cornelia Froboess as Cornelia "Conny" Haller
- Rudolf Vogel as John Newman
- Susi Nicoletti as Diana Haller
- Ingrid Pan as Steffi Gutlieb
- Elfie Pertramer as Erna Gutlieb
- Angèle Durand as Lola
- Rex Gildo as Billy Newman
- Paul Bös as Tommy
- Elke Arendt as Lotte
- Hans Zander as Fritz
- Harald Juhnke as Dr. Robert Berning
- Will Brandes as Christian
- Ulla Torp as Frau am Kaufhausfahrstuhl
- Frithjof Vierock as Kaufhauslehrling Fritz

== Bibliography ==
- Bock, Hans-Michael & Bergfelder, Tim. The Concise CineGraph. Encyclopedia of German Cinema. Berghahn Books, 2009.
