= Ulrich Bettac =

German actor and director (1897–1959)

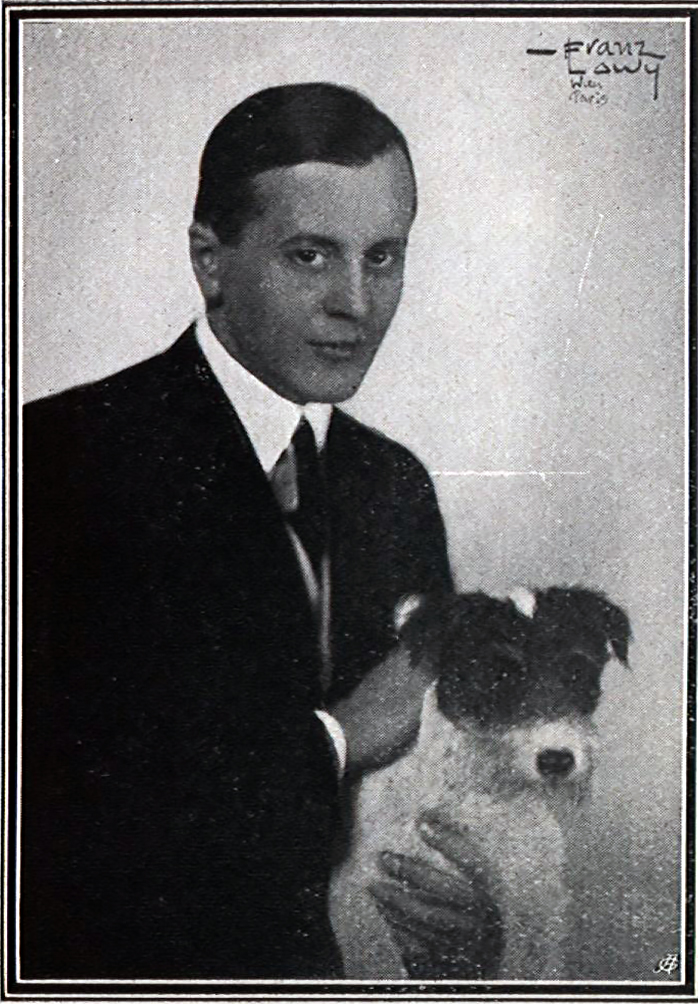
- Bettac in 1927
- Born: Ulrich Ewald Berthold Bettac; 2 May 1897; Stettin, Germany
- Died: 20 April 1959 (aged 61); Vienna, Austria
- Resting place: Vienna Central Cemetery

Ulrich Ewald Berthold Bettac (2 May 1897 – 20 April 1959) was an Austrian actor and theatre director. He was especially well known for his work as a character actor at the Burgtheater in Vienna; he also had a fairly extensive film career.

== Selected filmography ==
- The Girl from Capri (1924)
- The Mistress of Monbijou (1924)
- False Shame (1926)
- A Night at the Grand Hotel (1931)
- Come Back to Me (1944)
- Mysterious Shadows (1949)
- Duel with Death (1949)
- Dance Into Happiness (1951)
- 1. April 2000 (1952)
- Knall and Fall as Imposters (1952)
- The Great Temptation (1952)
- Adventure in Vienna (1952)
- Arlette Conquers Paris (1953)
- On the Green Meadow (1953)
- The Divorcée (1953)
- Mask in Blue (1953)
- The Eternal Waltz (1954)
- Sissi (1955)
- André and Ursula (1955)
- Mozart (1955)
- Goetz von Berlichingen (1955)
- Sissi – The Young Empress (1956)
