= I Was Jack Mortimer =

1935 film directed by Carl Froelich

- German film poster
- German: Ich war Jack Mortimer
- Directed by: Carl Froelich
- Written by: Robert A. Stemmle; Thea von Harbou
- Based on: I Was Jack Mortimer by Alexander Lernet-Holenia
- Produced by: Carl Froelich
- Starring: Anton Walbrook; Eugen Klöpfer; Sybille Schmitz
- Cinematography: Reimar Kuntze
- Edited by: Gustav Lohse
- Music by: Harald Böhmelt
- Production company: Carl Froelich-Film
- Distributed by: Tobis Film
- Release date: 17 October 1935
- Running time: 85 minutes
- Country: Germany
- Language: German

I Was Jack Mortimer (German: Ich war Jack Mortimer) is a 1935 German thriller film directed by Carl Froelich and starring Anton Walbrook, Eugen Klöpfer, and Sybille Schmitz. It was shot at the Tempelhof Studios in Berlin. The film's sets were designed by the art director Franz Schroedter. It is an adaptation of the 1933 novel of the same title by Alexander Lernet-Holenia.

== Synopsis ==
Struggling Budapest taxi driver Fred is frustrated because he lacks the funds to marry his girlfriend Marie whose Russian emigre family run an equally struggling Russian restaurant in the city. His big break seems to come when he assists a wealthy woman with the engine of her car and is hired as her chauffeur for a trip down to Monte Carlo on very good wages. On the same day celebrated conductor Pedro Montemayor arrives in the city for a concert, accompanied by his wife Winifred. His jealous, domineering nature has led her into a romance with American Jack Mortimer, who is also scheduled to arrive in the city and stay at the same hotel.

Shortly after Fred picks up Mortimer in his taxi from the station, Montemayor shoots the American dead from another car, having already been aware of his arrival. Fred immediately tries to go to the police, but finding them uninterested and suddenly alarmed that he will be blamed for the murder, dumps the body several miles away. He goes to his new employer and explains what happened, but she does not take him seriously. Increasingly desperate, he realises that if the American were known to have turned up at the hotel, he could not possibly have died in his taxi. He changes into the dead man's elegant clothes and briefly impersonates him at the hotel to establish his alibi. His fake identity is exposed when Winifred and her husband show up.

With the police now on his trail, Fred plans to escape the city, and Marie tries to assist him by fetching some money from his apartment. She is pursued by detectives to a dance hall where she meets up with Fred again. Just as things seem hopeless for Fred, Montemayor confesses to the crime. Asked by the investigating officer how it was possible for the dead American to show up at the hotel, Fred explains: "I was Jack Mortimer".

== Cast ==
- Anton Walbrook as Ferdinand 'Fred' Sponer, a Budapest taxi-driver
- Eugen Klöpfer as Pedro Montemayor, a conductor
- Sybille Schmitz as Winifred Montemayor, Pedro's wife
- Marieluise Claudius as Marie Polikow
- Max Gülstorff as Colonel Polikow, Marie's father
- Maria Loja as Mrs. Polikow, Marie's mother
- Hilde Hildebrand as Daisy
- Heinz Salfner as Andrassy, Daisy's friend
- Jochen Hauer as Doering, a taxi-driver
- Georg A. Profé as Jack Mortimer
- Hugo Drahower as Erster Kriminalbeamter
- Sophie Eschenbach as Daisy's Maid
- Michael von Newlinsky as Hotel manager
- Rudolf Essek as Empfangschef im Hotel
- Erich Fiedler as Schüchterner Mann
- Otto Grüneberg as Hotelpage
- Jochen Kuhlmey as Verkäufer im Uniformladen
- Peter Lau as Zweiter Kriminalbeamter
- Manfred Meurer as Kriminalkommissar
- Gerda von Kries as Zimmermädchen
- Josef Reithofer as Polizeiinspektor
- Albert von Kersten as Dritter Kriminalbeamter
- Eugen Wallrath as Verkehrspolizist
- Hanns Waschatko as Hotelportier

== See also ==
- Adventure in Vienna (1952)
- Stolen Identity (1953)
