= Dear Friend (1949 film) =

1949 film

- Directed by: Rudolf Steinboeck
- Written by: Curt J. Braun
- Starring: Johannes Heesters; Vilma Degischer; Erik Frey
- Cinematography: Willi Sohm
- Edited by: Leontine Klicka
- Music by: Hans Lang
- Production company: Theater in der Josefstadt
- Distributed by: Sascha-Film; Herzog Film
- Release date: 23 March 1949
- Running time: 102 minutes
- Country: Austria
- Language: German

Dear Friend (German: Liebe Freundin) is a 1949 Austrian drama film directed by Rudolf Steinboeck and starring Johannes Heesters, Vilma Degischer and Erik Frey. The film's sets were designed by the art director Herbert Ploberger.

== Cast ==
- Johannes Heesters as Adrian van der Steer
- Vilma Degischer as Susanne Berger, Sekretärin
- Erik Frey as Thomas Wolf, Verleger
- Erni Mangold as Doris Thaller, Tochter
- Teo Prokop as J.P. Thaller
- Heribert Aichinger as Der Packer Franz
- Karl Günther as Ein Strafverteidiger
- Ludmilla Hell as Frau Pichler, Vermieterin
- Peter Preses as Ein Anwalt
- Gustav Waldau as Ein Landpfarrer
- Irmtraut Jörg
- Gertrud Ramlo
- Evi Servaes
- Carlo Böhm
- Julius Brandt
- Hermann Glaser
- Peter Wehle

== Bibliography ==
- Fritsche, Maria. Homemade Men in Postwar Austrian Cinema: Nationhood, Genre and Masculinity. Berghahn Books, 2013.
