= Cordula (film) =

1950 film

- Paula Wessely and Attila Hörbiger
- Directed by: Gustav Ucicky
- Written by: Anton Wildgans (poem); Max Mell; Gustav Ucicky
- Produced by: Paula Wessely
- Starring: Paula Wessely; Attila Hörbiger; Jane Tilden
- Cinematography: Hans Schneeberger
- Edited by: Henny Brünsch
- Music by: Josef Marx
- Production company: Paula Wessely Filmproduktion
- Distributed by: Sascha Film; Union-Film (West Germany)
- Release date: 23 October 1950
- Running time: 103 minutes
- Country: Austria
- Language: German

Cordula is a 1950 Austrian drama film directed by Gustav Ucicky and starring Paula Wessely, Attila Hörbiger and Jane Tilden. It is based on a 1925 poem by Anton Wildgans about a woman in a small town who falls pregnant to a local forester serving in the Austrian Army during the First World War.

The film was the made by Wessely's independent production company, and was the sixth time she had appeared in a film directed by Usicky. It was partly shot on location in the vicinity of Vorau in Styria, using locals as extras. Interiors were shot at the Sievering Studios in Vienna with sets designed by the art director Otto Niedermoser.

== Cast ==
- Paula Wessely as Cordula
- Attila Hörbiger as Kirbisch
- Jane Tilden as Frau Kirbisch
- Alma Seidler as Rosa Rachoining
- Erik Frey as Fleps, forestry assistant
- Eduard Köck as pastor
- Leopold Rudolf as Vitus
- Fritz Imhoff as Tobias Pschunder
- Georg Filser as Andreas Pschunder, son
- Hermann Erhardt as Fürbass, Selcher
- Karl Skraup as Crinis, glazier
- Franz Messner as Fliegerleutnant
- Fritz Schmiedel as carpenter
- Karl Ehmann as forester
- Ralph Boddenhuser
- Helene Croy
- Pepi Glöckner-Kramer as Katharina, cook
- Hugo Gottschlich as Schriebelbauer
- Karl Günther
- Fred Hennings as district commissioner
- Karl Hruschka as Schwinzerl, gravedigger
- Willi Hufnagel
- Manfred Inger
- Julius Karsten
- Isolde Kaspar-Czejke
- Rudolf Klausner
- Klein-Vondra
- Edith Mill as Gusti, waitress
- Auguste Pünkösdy
- Lydia Rauch as summer guest #2
- Nina Sandt as summer guest #1
- Alfred Schnayder
- Walter Varndal
- Oskar Wegrostek
- Fritz Widhalm-Windegg
