= The Standard (novel) =

1934 novel by Alexander Lernet-Holenia

- Author: Alexander Lernet-Holenia
- Language: German
- Genre: War drama
- Publication date: 1934
- Publication place: Austria
- Media type: Print

The Standard (German: Die Standarte) is a 1934 novel by the Austrian writer Alexander Lernet-Holenia. Set during the closing days of the First World War an officer of the Austro-Hungarian Army attempts to save his regimental colours from capture. They are taken back to Vienna and ceremonially burnt.

== Adaptations ==
In 1935 it was turned into a German film My Life for Maria Isabella directed by Erich Waschneck. In 1977 it was remade as The Standard a co-production directed by Ottokar Runze and starring Simon Ward.

== Bibliography ==
- Goble, Alan. The Complete Index to Literary Sources in Film. Walter de Gruyter, 1999.
- Noack, Frank. Veit Harlan: The Life and Work of a Nazi Filmmaker. University Press of Kentucky, 2016.
