= Michael Kehlmann =

Austrian actor and film director (1927–2005)

- Born: September 21, 1927; Vienna, Austria
- Died: December 1, 2005 (aged 78); Vienna, Austria
- Occupations: Television film director, theatre director, screenwriter, actor
- Years active: 1951–1992
- Children: Daniel Kehlmann
- Awards: J.-Kainz Medal (1966) * Ehrenmedaille der Stadt Wien (1966) * Austrian Cross of Honour for Science and Art (2002)

Michael Kehlmann (21 September 1927 – 1 December 2005) was an Austrian television film director and theatre director, screenwriter and actor.

During 1951–1953, Kehlmann was the manager of the "Kleines Theater im Konzerthaus", Vienna. He was awarded the J.-Kainz Medal in 1966, the Ehrenmedaille der Stadt Wien in 1966 and the Austrian Honorary Cross for Science and Art in 2002.

Kehlmann's television directing credits included Jack Mortimer, Einen Jux will er sich machen, Geschichten aus dem Wienerwald, Radetzkymarsch, Hiob, and Tatort.

He was the father of writer Daniel Kehlmann.

== Credits ==
=== Director (Film) ===
- 1960: Die Brücke des Schicksals
- 1962: Life Begins at Eight
- 1967: Kurzer Prozess

=== Director (Television) ===
- 1954: Die Wäscherin des Herrn Bonaparte — (based on Madame Sans-Gêne)
- 1954: Künstlerpech
- 1954: Jedem die Seine
- 1954: Klavier zu verkaufen
- 1955: La Brige und das Gesetz — (based on a play by Georges Courteline)
- 1955: Die Dynastie hat Ausgang
- 1955: Falsch verbunden
- 1955: Unternehmen Hosentasche
- 1955: Frühere Verhältnisse — (based on Frühere Verhältnisse by Johann Nestroy)
- 1956: Der Verrat von Ottawa — (based on the Gouzenko Affair)
- 1956: Juno und der Pfau — (based on Juno and the Paycock)
- 1956: Das gnadenbringende Strafgericht
- 1957: Die Dreigroschenoper — (based on The Threepenny Opera)
- 1957: Monsieur Lamberthier — (based on a play by Louis Verneuil)
- 1957: Der verschwundene Graf
- 1957: Der versteinerte Wald — (based on The Petrified Forest by Robert E. Sherwood)
- 1958: Biologie und Tennis — (based on a radio play by Alfred Andersch)
- 1958: Das Lächeln der Gioconda — (based on novelette "The Gioconda Smile")
- 1958: Eine fast mögliche Geschichte — (based on A Likely Tale by Gerald Savory)
- 1959: Joan of Lorraine — (based on Joan of Lorraine)
- 1959: Kasimir and Karoline — (based on a play by Ödön von Horváth)
- 1959: Land, das meine Sprache spricht — (based on Der zwanzigste Juli by Alexander Lernet-Holenia)
- 1959: Es gibt immer drei Möglichkeiten
- 1960: Der eingebildete Kranke — (based on The Imaginary Invalid)
- 1960: Shadow of Heroes — (based on Shadow of Heroes)
- 1960: Fährten — (based on a play by Ferdinand Bruckner)
- 1961: Judgement Day — (based on a play by Ödön von Horváth)
- 1961: Nora — (based on A Doll's House)
- 1961: Jack Mortimer — (based on I Was Jack Mortimer by Alexander Lernet-Holenia)
- 1961: Er ging an meiner Seite — (based on Home of the Brave)
- 1962: Einen Jux will er sich machen — (based on Einen Jux will er sich machen)
- 1962: Die Großherzogin von Gerolstein — (based on La Grande-Duchesse de Gérolstein)
- 1962: Die Besessenen — (based on The Possessed)
- 1963: Der grüne Kakadu — (based on Der grüne Kakadu by Arthur Schnitzler)
- 1963: Der Bockerer — (based on Der Bockerer by Ulrich Becher and Peter Preses)
- 1963: Reporter — (based on The Front Page)
- 1963: Death of a Salesman — (based on Death of a Salesman)
- 1963: Die Grotte — (based on La Grotte by Jean Anouilh)
- 1964: Der Talisman — (based on Der Talisman by Johann Nestroy)
- 1964: Criminals — (based on a play by Ferdinand Bruckner)
- 1964: Sergeant Dower muß sterben — (based on Shout for Life by Terence Feely)
- 1964: Tales from the Vienna Woods — (based on Tales from the Vienna Woods)
- 1965: Radetzkymarsch — (based on Radetzky March)
- 1965: Don Juan oder Die Liebe zur Geometrie — (based on Don Juan oder Die Liebe zur Geometrie by Max Frisch)
- 1965: Case for a Rebel — (based on the play Plaidoyer pour un rebelle by Emmanuel Roblès)
- 1966: Italienische Nacht — (based on Italienische Nacht by Ödön von Horváth)
- 1966: Face of a Hero — (based on a novel by Pierre Boulle, adapted by Robert L. Joseph)
- 1966: Flieger Ross — (based on Ross)
- 1966: Rette sich, wer kann oder Dummheit siegt überall
- 1967: Bericht eines Feiglings
- 1967: Nur kein Cello — (based on The Absence of a Cello by Ira Wallach)
- 1967: Umsonst — (based on Umsonst! by Johann Nestroy)
- 1968: Die Unbekannte aus der Seine — (based on a play by Ödön von Horváth)
- 1968: Madame Legros — (based on a play by Heinrich Mann)
- 1968: Sich selbst der Nächste — (based on Are You by Yourself? by Leo Lehman)
- 1968: Schloß in den Wolken — (based on a play by Sam Locke)
- 1969: Ende eines Leichtgewichts
- 1969: Das Trauerspiel von Julius Caesar — (based on Julius Caesar)
- 1969: A Village Without Men — (based on Ein Dorf ohne Männer by Ödön von Horváth)
- 1969: Die Perle – Aus dem Tagebuch einer Hausgehilfin (TV series)
- 1970: Mit sich allein — (based on End of Story by Leo Lehman)
- 1970: Der Kommissar (TV series): Tod eines Klavierspielers
- 1971: Augenzeugen müssen blind sein — (based on Forget What You Saw by Jeffrey Ashford)
- 1971: Chopin-Express — (screenplay by Leo Lehman)
- 1972: Tatort (TV series): Münchner Kindl
- 1972: Galgentoni — (based on a play by Egon Kisch)
- 1972: Der Andersonville-Prozess — (based on The Andersonville Trial by Saul Levitt)
- 1974: Nichts als Erinnerung — (based on a novel by Milo Dor)
- 1974: Tatort (TV series): 3:0 für Veigl
- 1974: Telerop 2009 – Es ist noch was zu retten (TV series)
- 1975: Zahnschmerzen — (screenplay by Leo Lehman)
- 1975: Die weiße Stadt — (based on a novel by Milo Dor)
- 1977: In freier Landschaft — (screenplay by Leo Lehman)
- 1977: The Winslow Boy — (based on The Winslow Boy)
- 1978: Tatort (TV series): Mord im Krankenhaus
- 1978: Job (TV miniseries) — (based on Job)
- 1980: Glaube, Liebe, Hoffnung — (based on Glaube Liebe Hoffnung by Ödön von Horváth)
- 1980: Felix und Oskar (TV series) — (based on The Odd Couple)
- 1980: Land, das meine Sprache spricht — (based on Der zwanzigste Juli by Alexander Lernet-Holenia)
- 1981: Quartett bei Claudia — (based on a play by Leo Lehman)
- 1982: Das heiße Herz — (based on the play The Hasty Heart by John Patrick)
- 1982: Tarabas — (based on Tarabas by Joseph Roth)
- 1983: Gegenlicht — (based on a novel by Walter Wippersberg)
- 1983: Why Am I So Happy? — (based on a novel by Johannes Mario Simmel)
- 1985: Die Flucht ohne Ende — (based on Flight without End)
- 1986: Tatort (TV series): Riedmüller, Vorname Sigi
- 1987: Tatort (TV series): Pension Tosca oder Die Sterne lügen nicht
- 1988: Geheime Reichssache — (based on the Blomberg–Fritsch Affair)
- 1990: The Master of the Day of Judgment — (based on The Master of the Day of Judgment by Leo Perutz)
- 1991: Heldenfrühling
- 1992: Die Ringe des Saturn — (based on a novel by Peter Zeindler)
- 1992: Bartolomé de Las Casas — (based on Las Casas vor Karl V. by Reinhold Schneider)

=== Screenwriter ===
- 1952: Adventure in Vienna (dir. Emil-Edwin Reinert)

=== Actor ===
- 1952: Adventure in Vienna (dir. Emil-Edwin Reinert), as Passport forger
- 1953: To Be Without Worries (dir. Georg Marischka)
- 1975: Die weiße Stadt (dir. Michael Kehlmann)
- 1982: Tarabas (dir. Michael Kehlmann), as Narrator (voice)
- 1985: Flucht ohne Ende (dir. Michael Kehlmann), as Narrator (voice)
- 1987: '38 – Vienna Before the Fall (dir. Wolfgang Glück)
