= Jane Tilden =

Austrian actress

- Born: 16 November 1910; Aussig, Austro-Hungarian Empire
- Died: 27 August 2002 (aged 91); Kitzbühel, Austria
- Other name: Marianne Wilhelmine Tuch
- Occupation: Actress
- Years active: 1936-2000 (film)

Marianne Wilhelmine Tuch (16 November 1910 – 27 August 2002), known professionally as Jane Tilden, was an Austrian actress who had a long career on stage and in films and television shows.

== Biography ==
Tilden was born in Aussig, then part of the Austro-Hungarian Empire. She was the sister of the cinematographer Walter Tuch.

After making her debut on the stage in the early 1930s she appeared regularly in German and Austrian films during the Nazi era including the 1938 comedy The Blue Fox (1938). After the Second World War she worked regularly in film and television, increasingly in supporting roles.

She was married three times, her husbands included the actor Erik Frey and composer Alexander Steinbrecher.

== Selected filmography ==
- Confetti (1936)
- The Emperor's Candlesticks (1936)
- Hannerl and Her Lovers (1936)
- Flowers from Nice (1936)
- The Blue Fox (1938)
- Mirror of Life (1938)
- Happiness is the Main Thing (1941)
- Two Happy People (1943)
- Cordula (1950)
- Anna Louise and Anton (1953)
- Emperor's Ball (1956)
- The True Jacob (1960)
- The Good Soldier Schweik (1960)
- What Is Father Doing in Italy? (1961)
- Romance in Venice (1962)
- Johnny Colt (1966)
- The Liar and the Nun (1967)
- The Mad Aunts Strike Out (1971)
- The Count of Luxemburg (1972)
- Attempted Flight (1976)
- Tales from the Vienna Woods (1979)
- Sting in the Flesh (1981)
- Cats' Play (1983, TV film)

== Bibliography ==
- Waldman, Harry. Nazi Films In America, 1933-1942. McFarland & Co, 2008.
