= The Other Life (film) =

- Directed by: Rudolf Steinboeck
- Written by: Alfred Ilbach
- Based on: Twentieth of July by Alexander Lernet-Holenia
- Produced by: Viktor von Struwe
- Starring: Aglaja Schmid; Robert Lindner; Gustav Waldau
- Cinematography: Willi Sohm
- Music by: Franz Salmhofer
- Production company: Theater in der Josefstadt
- Distributed by: Sascha-Film
- Release date: 4 May 1948
- Running time: 109 minutes
- Country: Austria
- Language: German

The Other Life (German: Das andere Leben) is a 1948 Austrian drama film directed by Rudolf Steinboeck and starring Aglaja Schmid, Robert Lindner and Gustav Waldau. The sets were designed by the art director Herbert Ploberger. It is based on the 1947 novella Twentieth of July by Alexander Lernet-Holenia. It entered 1948 Venice International Film Festival.

== Synopsis ==
During the Nazi era, an Austrian, Elisabeth Josselin, assists Suzette, a Jewish friend, by swapping papers with her so she can get medical treatment. When Suzette dies, Elisabeth finds herself officially dead and so decides to adopt the identity of Suzette. Meanwhile, her husband Major Walter Josselin becomes involved in the July Plot against Adolf Hitler.

== Cast ==
- Aglaja Schmid as Elisabeth Josselin
- Robert Lindner as Major Walter Josselin
- Gustav Waldau as Hofrat Buschek
- Vilma Degischer as Suzette Alberti
- Leopold Rudolf as Dozent Thomas Alberti
- Siegfried Breuer as Bukowsky
- Erik Frey as Latheit
- Anton Edthofer as General Rissius
- Hans Ziegler as Dr. Joel
- Erni Mangold as Mizzi
- Karl Günther as Oberst Schönborn

== Bibliography ==
- Fritsche, Maria. Homemade Men in Postwar Austrian Cinema: Nationhood, Genre and Masculinity. Berghahn Books, 2013.
- Von Dassanowsky, Robert. Austrian Cinema: A History. McFarland, 2005.
