= Herbert Ploberger =

Austrian costume designer and art director

- Born: 6 April 1902; Wels, Austro-Hungarian Empire
- Died: 22 January 1977 (aged 74); Munich, Bavaria, West Germany
- Occupation: Actor
- Years active: 1936-1974 (film & TV)

Herbert Ploberger (1902–1977) was an Austrian costume designer and art director active in German and Austrian cinema.

== Selected filmography ==
- Savoy Hotel 217 (1936)
- Condottieri (1937)
- Kora Terry (1940)
- The Other Life (1948)
- Dear Friend (1949)
- Hula-Hopp, Conny (1959)

== Bibliography ==
- Fritsche, Maria. Homemade Men In Postwar Austrian Cinema: Nationhood, Genre and Masculinity . Berghahn Books, 2013.
