= Franz Schubert (film) =

Franz Schubert – Ein Leben in zwei Sätzen
- Directed by: Walter Kolm-Veltée
- Written by: Walter Kolm-Veltée
- Starring: Heinrich Schweiger; Aglaja Schmid
- Cinematography: Karl Kirchner; Hanns König
- Edited by: Josef Juvancic
- Music by: Karl Pauspertl; Franz Schubert; Ludwig van Beethoven
- Production company: Beta-Film
- Distributed by: Universal-Film
- Release date: 18 November 1953
- Running time: 111 minutes
- Country: Austria
- Language: German

Franz Schubert (original German title: Franz Schubert – Ein Leben in zwei Sätzen) is a 1953 Austrian film depicting composer Franz Schubert's life and work.

It was shot at the Rosenhügel Studios in Vienna with sets designed by the art director Leo Metzenbauer.

== Plot ==
Franz Schubert works as an assistant teacher in the school led by his father. In his spare time, however, the young man, who considers Ludwig van Beethoven to be his unattainable role model, devotes himself to writing music. As public acceptance is denied to him, his friends lobby the music publisher Anton Diabelli for a public performance of Schubert's music. During a reception, at which Schubert performs his Ave Maria, he gets to know singer Therese Grob.

Schubert decides to quit the employment at his father's and, instead, to concentrate entirely on music, and moves in his with friends, poets Franz von Schober and Moritz von Schwind and painter Johann Mayerhofer. There, he is inspired to set Johann Wolfgang von Goethes ballad Der Erlkönig to music.

Schubert's friends encourage him to play his music in public. Schubert and Therese, who sings his songs, are made one. The two make a living by performing Schuberts songs. However, Schubert becomes doubtful about songs being the most suitable channel for his musical vision, and so decides to turn to writing symphonies and operas. As Schubert applies for the position of a Vice Director of Music, Therese hands over to the Secretary of the Court Theatre Schuberts latest work, the Unfinished Symphony. Disagreements arise during the rehearsals for Schubert's latest opera, as the singer of the leading part considers the music too difficult to sing. Music publishers Tobias Haslinger and Anton Diabelli reject his music. Even his very promising application as a Vice Director of Music proves to be unsuccessful.

Thus, depressed Schubert decides to tour his songs in order to make a living. In this period of time, he writes the Winterreise.

After having returned, Schubert decides to have lessons in counterpoint with Beethoven, but shies away from contacting his idol. Shortly later, while being plagued by health problems, Schubert gets a visit from Beethoven's secretary Anton Schindler. Sickly Beethoven sends some Goethe poems to Schubert to be set in music, as Beethoven regards Schubert to be the better song composer.

As Schubert wants to visit Beethoven, he arrives too late: Beethoven has died. Schubert is one of the torchbearers during Beethoven's funeral. Suffering from more and more serious health problems, Schubert is no longer able to perceive the success of a public performance of his music. He dies one year after his idol.

== Cast ==
- Heinrich Schweiger: Franz Schubert
- Aglaja Schmid: Therese Grob
- Hans Thimig: Father Schubert
- Karl Bosse: Heinrich Grob
- Maria Eis: Madame Schechner
- Rolf Wanka: Franz Schober
- Louis Soldan: Moritz von Schwind
- Michael Janisch: Bergmann
- Anni Korin: Netty
- Erwin Strahl: Johann Mayerhofer
- Karl Mittner: Ferdinand Schubert
- Fritz Hinz-Fabricius: Court opera singer Vogl
- Richard Eybner: Secretary of the Court theatre
- Chariklia Baxevanos: Young girl
- Fritz Imhoff:
- Senta Wengraf
- Fred Hennings
- Otto Treßler
- Franz Pfaudler
- Alma Seidler
- Susanne Engelhart
- Karl Ehmann
- Marianne Gerzner
- Franz Herterich
- Gisa Wurm
