= Maria Theresa (film) =

1951 film directed by Emil E. Reinert

- Directed by: Emil E. Reinert
- Written by: Hans Rameau
- Produced by: Paula Wessely
- Starring: Paula Wessely; Fred Liewehr; Marianne Schönauer
- Cinematography: Friedl Behn-Grund
- Music by: Alois Melichar
- Production company: Paula Wessely Filmproduktion
- Distributed by: Union Film
- Release date: 19 December 1951
- Running time: 91 minutes
- Country: Austria
- Language: German

Maria Theresa (German: Maria Theresia) is a 1951 Austrian historical drama film directed by Emil E. Reinert and starring Paula Wessely, Fred Liewehr and Marianne Schönauer. It portrays the life of the eighteenth century Habsburg Empress Maria Theresa.

It was produced by star Paula Wessely's own production company. The film's sets were designed by the art director Werner Schlichting. Some location shooting took place at the Schönbrunn Palace in Vienna.

== Cast ==
- Paula Wessely as Maria Theresia
- Fred Liewehr as Franz I.
- Marianne Schönauer as Maria Valeria von Aliano, spätere Fürstin Trautperg
- Rosa Albach-Retty as Gräfin Fuchs
- Kurti Baumgartner as Maximilian
- Karl Ehmann as Graf Künigl
- Maria Eis as Fürstin Gollinsky
- Rudolf Fernau as Graf Kaunitz
- Erik Frey as Fürst Trautperg
- Harry Hardt as Fürst Wildenstein
- Franz Herterich as Päpstlicher Nuntius
- Attila Hörbiger as Hofkriegsratspräsident Harrach
- Adrian Hoven as Leutnant Cordona
- Milan von Kamare as Graf Lichtenau
- Julius Karsten as Graf Chotek
- Cees Laseur as Leibarzt von Swieten
- Johanna Matz as Maria Elisabeth
- Paul Pranger as Graf Haugwitz
- Emmerich Reimers as Graf Colloredo
- Leopold Rudolf as Graf Losy
- Nina Sandt as Gräfin Susi Bernburg
- Dagny Servaes as Obersthofmeisterin Gräfin Hagen
- Otto Treßler as Graf Aliano
- Robert Valberg as graf Wittenheim
- Rolf Wanka as Oberstkämmerer Khevenhüller
- Karl Haberfellner as Leopold
- Alfred Huttig
- Susanne Kissner as Maria Amalia
- Peter Klein as Ferdinand
- Ingeborg Richter as Maria Carolina
- Loni von Friedl as Marie Antoinette

== Bibliography ==
- Fritsche, Maria. Homemade Men in Postwar Austrian Cinema: Nationhood, Genre and Masculinity. Berghahn Books, 2013.
