= The Masked Ones =

1920 film directed by Franz Seitz

- Directed by: Franz Seitz
- Written by: Franz Seitz
- Starring: William Dieterle; Karl Günther; Friedrich August Koch
- Production company: Filmhaus Bavaria
- Distributed by: Bavaria Film
- Release date: April 1920
- Country: Germany
- Languages: Silent; German intertitles

The Masked Ones (German: Die Vermummten) is a 1920 German silent film directed by Franz Seitz and starring William Dieterle, Karl Günther and Friedrich August Koch.

It was shot at the Bavaria Studios in Munich.

== Cast ==
- William Dieterle as Bernard
- Karl Günther as Richard Gibbon
- Friedrich August Koch as Allan Lynn
- Klara Putze as Lucy Hénault
- Hans Staufen as Fremder

== Bibliography ==
- Bock, Hans-Michael & Bergfelder, Tim. The Concise CineGraph. Encyclopedia of German Cinema. Berghahn Books, 2009.
