= The Standard (film) =

- Directed by: Ottokar Runze
- Written by: Herbert Asmodi
- Based on: The Standard by Alexander Lernet-Holenia
- Produced by: Otto Boris Dworak; Ottokar Runze
- Starring: Simon Ward; Siegfried Rauch; Peter Cushing
- Cinematography: Michael Epp
- Edited by: Tamara Epp
- Music by: Hans-Martin Majewski
- Production companies: Neue Thalia-Film; Norddeutsche Filmproduktion; Ottokar Runze Filmproduktion; Producciones Cinematográficas Orfeo
- Distributed by: Gunther Wessel Filmverleih
- Release date: 18 May 1977
- Running time: 120 minutes
- Countries: Austria; Spain; West Germany
- Languages: German; English

The Standard (German: Die Standarte) is a 1977 war drama film directed by Ottokar Runze and starring Simon Ward, Siegfried Rauch and Peter Cushing. It was made as a co-production between Austria, Spain and West Germany. The film is based on the 1934 novel The Standard by Alexander Lernet-Holenia, previously turned into a 1935 film My Life for Maria Isabella in Nazi Germany. It premiered at the Cannes Film Festival.

The film's sets were designed by the art director Peter Scharff. Location shooting took place in Vienna and Toledo province in Spain.

Another English-language title of this film is Battle Flag.

== Cast ==
- Simon Ward as Officer Menis
- Siegfried Rauch as Graf Bottenlauben
- Peter Cushing as Baron von Hackenberg
- Jon Finch as Major Charbinsky
- Viktor Staal as Anton
- Verónica Forqué as Louise Lang
- Gerd Böckmann as Anschütz
- Robert Hoffmann as Koch
- Wolfgang Preiss as Oberst
- Lil Dagover as Erzherzogin
- Maria Perschy as Mordax
- Erik Frey as Oberstleutnant
- David Robb as English Officer
- Michael Janisch as Orbeliani
- Friedrich von Ledebur as General
- Rudolf Prack as Lakai- Kaiserlicher Diener im Hof
- Kurt Sowinetz as Kaiserlischer Diener im Kaminzimmer
- Hans Thimig as Hofbeamter

== Bibliography ==
- Bock, Hans-Michael & Bergfelder, Tim. The Concise CineGraph. Encyclopedia of German Cinema. Berghahn Books, 2009.
- Goble, Alan. The Complete Index to Literary Sources in Film. Walter de Gruyter, 1999.
