= My Name is Niki =

1952 film

- Directed by: Rudolf Jugert
- Written by: Erna Fentsch
- Produced by: Willy Jeske; Georg Richter; Georg Witt
- Starring: Paul Hörbiger; Aglaja Schmid; Hardy Krüger
- Cinematography: Josef Illig; Franz Koch; Conrad Storgmeier
- Edited by: Fritz Stapenhorst
- Music by: Werner Eisbrenner
- Production company: Georg Witt-Film
- Distributed by: Bavaria Film
- Release date: 5 August 1952
- Running time: 101 minutes
- Country: West Germany
- Language: German

My Name is Niki (German: Ich heiße Niki) is a 1952 West German comedy drama film directed by Rudolf Jugert and starring Paul Hörbiger, Aglaja Schmid and Hardy Krüger. It was made by Bavaria Film at the company's Munich Studios and on location in the city and in Hamburg. The film's sets were designed by the art directors Franz Bi and Botho Höfer.

== Synopsis ==
While travelling on a train, civil servant Hieronymus Spitz encounters young mother Winnie and her child Niki. When the train pulls into a station she gets off, leaving Niki and her suitcase behind. A letter reveals that she cannot look after the boy and entrusts him to Spitz. He plans to give the child to the authorities, but changes his mind at the urging of his landlady Jette and the two plan to raise the boy themselves.

Winnie abandoned Niki because he was illegitimate and she was planning to emigrate to America with her fiancee Paul, who she feared would not accept another man's child. Having regrets, she skips the ship and instead begins to search for son in Munich. Paul, having discovered the truth, comes after her. The two join forces to find Niki. When at last he is discovered at Spitz's house, the civil servant is very reluctant to hand the child over. Due to his engaging personality, Niki has completely transformed the staid civil servant's life.

== Cast ==
- Paul Hörbiger as Hieronymus Spitz
- Aglaja Schmid as Winnie
- Hardy Krüger as Paul
- Erika von Thellmann as Jette
- Lina Carstens as Frau Altmann
- Heini Göbel as Stangl
- Bruno Hübner as Regierungsdirektor
- Hans Pössenbacher as Bahnhofsvorstand
- Charles Regnier as Redakteur Claus
- Hedwig Wangel as Guste
- Carsta Löck as Junge Magd
- Harry Hertzsch as Kommissar
- Ewald Wenck as Schaffner
- Claus Hollmann as Niki

== Bibliography ==
- James Robert Parish. Film Actors Guide. Scarecrow Press, 1977.
