= Willi Sohm =

Austrian cinematographer

Willi Sohm (1913–1974) was an Austrian cinematographer.

== Filmography ==
- 1947: It's Only Love
- 1948: The Other Life
- 1948: Verlorenes Rennen
- 1949: Hexen
- 1949: Dear Friend
- 1951: Gateway to Peace
- 1951: Call Over the Air
- 1952: Abenteuer im Schloss
- 1953: Daughter of the Regiment
- 1954: Der Komödiant von Wien
- 1955: Her First Date
- 1955: Don Juan
- 1955: The Three from the Filling Station
- 1956: The Road to Paradise
- 1956: Ein tolles Hotel
- 1956: Gasparone
- 1956: Die Christel von der Post
- 1956: Das Donkosakenlied
- 1956: Der schräge Otto
- 1957: Das haut hin
- 1957: Es wird alles wieder gut
- 1957: Hoch droben auf dem Berg
- 1958: Two Hearts in May
- 1958: Skandal um Dodo
- 1958: When She Starts, Look Out
- 1958: Trees Are Blooming in Vienna
- 1958: Eine Reise ins Glück
- 1958: Frauensee
- 1959: Wenn das mein großer Bruder wüßte
- 1960: The Avenger
- 1960: Ein Student ging vorbei
- 1960: Mal drunter – mal drüber
- 1960: The Hero of My Dreams
- 1960: When the Heath Is in Bloom
- 1961: Schlagerrevue 1962
- 1962: The Gypsy Baron

== Bibliography ==
- Bergfelder, Tim. International Adventures: German Popular Cinema and European Co-Productions in the 1960s. Berghahn Books, 2005.
