= Franz Pfaudler =

Austrian actor

- Born: 29 June 1893; Vienna, Austro-Hungarian Empire
- Died: 5 May 1956 (aged 62); Vienna, Austria
- Occupation: Actor
- Years active: 1935-1956 (film)

Franz Pfaudler (1893–1956) was an Austrian stage and film actor.

== Selected filmography ==
- My Life for Maria Isabella (1935)
- What Now, Sibylle? (1938)
- Renate in the Quartet (1939)
- Der Postmeister (1940)
- Heimkehr (1941)
- Anuschka (1942)
- Schrammeln (1944)
- Melusine (1944)
- The Millionaire (1947)
- Maresi (1948)
- Eroica (1949)
- Archduke Johann's Great Love (1950)
- Franz Schubert (1953)
- The Vulture Wally (1956)

== Bibliography ==
- Giesen, Rolf. Nazi Propaganda Films: A History and Filmography. McFarland, 2003.
