= Notarztwagen 7 =

- Created by: Bruno Hampel
- Directed by: Helmut Ashley
- Country of origin: Germany
- No. of seasons: 1
- No. of episodes: 13

Original release
- Network: ARD
- Release: 1 December 1976 – 23 March 1977

Notarztwagen 7 is a 1976–1977 German medical drama television series directed by Helmut Ashley. It is regarded as a cult television series in Germany. Thirteen 25 minute episodes were produced for ARD and it aired from 1 December 1976. Notarztwagen means "Emergency Doctor Vehicle". The screenplay was written by Bruno Hampel. The theme tune was composed by Peter Thomas.

== Plot ==
The series portrays the contemporary life of a rescue team, emergency physician and paramedics. It is filmed in and around Frankfurt as well as occasionally in Wiesbaden and set at BG Trauma Clinic Frankfurt am Main.

== Cast ==
- Joachim Bliese: Dr. Brandenberg
- Rainer Basedow
- Emily Reuer: Dr. Barbara Kersten
- Kornelia Boje
- Thomas Braut
- Herbert Guenter
- Klaus Havenstein
- Manfred Heidmann
- Sascha Hehn
- Horst Keller
- Eva Pflug
- Marlies Schoenau
- Erwin Schwab
- Andreas Seyferth
- Helga Sloop: Disponentin Fa. Pol Eis
- Paul Sobania
- Guenther Tabor

== Episodes ==
1. Bestimmungsort Frankfurt (1. December 1976)
2. Die Gefälligkeit (8. December 1976)
3. Später Frühling (15. December 1976)
4. 801 übernimmt die Fahndung (22. December 1976)
5. Die Jubilarin (5. January 1977)
6. Die Pleite muss gefeiert werden (12. January 1977)
7. Letzter Aufruf für Dr. Reimann (19. January 1977)
8. Bodenloser Leichtsinn (2. February 1977)
9. Die Prüfung (9. February 1977)
10. Nur 220 Volt (16. February 1977)
11. Selbst ist der Mann (2. March 1977)
12. Endstation Kanal (9. March 1977)
13. Die große Schau (23. March 1977)

== See also ==
- List of German television series
