= The Blue Fox (1938 film) =

1938 film directed by Viktor Tourjansky

- DVD cover
- Directed by: Viktor Tourjansky
- Written by: Ferenc Herczeg (play); Karl Georg Külb; Ulrike Sanders
- Produced by: Bruno Duday
- Starring: Zarah Leander; Willy Birgel; Paul Hörbiger; Jane Tilden
- Cinematography: Franz Weihmayr
- Edited by: Walter Fredersdorf
- Music by: Lothar Brühne
- Production company: UFA
- Distributed by: UFA
- Release date: 14 December 1938
- Running time: 101 minutes
- Country: Germany
- Language: German

The Blue Fox (German: Der Blaufuchs) is a 1938 German comedy film directed by Viktor Tourjansky and starring Zarah Leander, Willy Birgel and Paul Hörbiger. It was based on a play by the Hungarian writer Ferenc Herczeg. It includes the song Kann denn Liebe Sünde sein. It was shot at the Babelsberg Studios in Potsdam and on location in Budapest. The film's sets were designed by the art director Werner Schlichting.

== Synopsis ==
Tired by her husband's lack of interest in her, due to his obsessive focus on his scientific study of fish, a Budapest woman flirts with the idea of running off with another man.

== Cast ==
- Zarah Leander as Ilona Paulus
- Willy Birgel as Tabor Vary
- Paul Hörbiger as Stephan Paulus
- Jane Tilden as Lisi
- Karl Schönböck as Trill
- Rudolf Platte as Coachman Bela
- Eduard Wenck as Signalman Ürem
- Edith Meinhard as Tilla
- Gertrud de Lalsky as Professorengattin
- Erich Dunskus as Tankstellenwart
- Olga Engl as Ilonas Tante Margit
- Lothar Geist as Tankstellenlehrling
- Max Hiller as Ungarischer Bauer am Bahnhof
- Antonie Jaeckel as Die Frau Rektor
- Eva Klein-Donath as Professorengattin
- Ingolf Kuntze as Direktor des Trocadero
- Majan Lex as Anuschka, Magd bei Tante Margit
- Friedel Müller as Professorengattin
- Erich Nadler as Spielleiter im Trocadero
- Paul Rehkopf as Ungarischer Bauer
- Berta Scheven as Frau des Bahnwärters
- Franz von Bokay as Josy, Diener bei Tante Margit

== Bibliography ==
- Hake, Sabine (2001). Popular Cinema of the Third Reich. Austin: University of Texas Press. ISBN 978-0-292-73458-6.
- Reimer, Robert C.; Reimer, Carol J. (2010). The A to Z of German Cinema. Lanham, MD: Scarecrow Press. ISBN 978-1-4617-3186-3.
