= Count Luna =

1955 novel by Alexander Lernet-Holenia

- 1960 edition Rowohlt Verlag
- Author: Alexander Lernet-Holenia
- Language: German
- Genre: Drama mystery
- Publication date: 1955
- Publication place: Austria
- Media type: Print

Count Luna (German: Der Graf Luna) is a 1955 mystery novel by the Austrian writer Alexander Lernet-Holenia. It is set during the Nazi era and deals with issues raised between the Anschluss and the extent of Austrian guilt.

== Synopsis ==
An anti-Nazi head of a shipping firm, booming due to wartime business, unwittingly takes over an estate of land belonging to an aristocrat who is sent to a concentration camp on a trumped up charge. After the war he becomes convinced that the man Count Luna, has survived and is plotting revenge against him.

== Bibliography ==
- Robert von Dassanowsky. Austrian Cinema: A History. McFarland, 2005.
