= My Life for Maria Isabella =

1935 drama film by Erich Waschneck

- Directed by: Erich Waschneck
- Written by: Friedrich Dammann; Ernst Hasselbach
- Based on: The Standard by Alexander Lernet-Holenia
- Produced by: Frank Clifford
- Starring: Viktor de Kowa; Maria Andergast; Peter Voß
- Cinematography: Herbert Körner
- Edited by: Willy Zeunert
- Music by: Herbert Windt
- Production company: Lloyd-Film
- Distributed by: Rota-Film
- Release date: 7 February 1935
- Running time: 78 minutes
- Country: Germany
- Language: German

My Life for Maria Isabella (German: Mein Leben für Maria Isabell) is a 1935 German drama film directed by Erich Waschneck and starring Viktor de Kowa, Maria Andergast and Peter Voß. It is a military drama, the titular Maria Isabella being the name of a regiment. Heavy cuts were imposed by the censors because of concerns the film's mutiny scenes were too attractively portrayed. Critics were not impressed by the casting of Viktor de Kowa, known for his light musical comedy roles, as the film's hero.

It was shot at the Johannisthal Studios in Berlin. The film's sets were designed by the art directors Otto Erdmann and Hans Sohnle. It was distributed by the Tobis subsidiary Rota-Film.

== Synopsis ==
In Belgrade during the closing days of the First World War, the Austrian regiments are mostly composed of disgruntled minorities who mutiny rather than fight on. A young officer attempts to save the regimental colours from falling into enemy hands, and safely takes them back to Vienna where they are symbolically burnt.

== Cast ==
- Viktor de Kowa as Fähnrich Menis
- Maria Andergast as Resa Lang
- Peter Voß as Rittmeister Graf Bottenlauben
- Franz Pfaudler as Diener Anton
- Hans-Joachim Büttner
- Hermann Frick
- Julia Serda
- Karin Evans
- Bernhard Minetti as Rittmeister von Hackenberg
- Ernst Karchow
- Harry Hardt as Oberstleutnant
- Ekkehard Arendt
- Hans Junkermann as Stadtkommandant von Belgrad
- Hans Zesch-Ballot as Major Sumerset
- Veit Harlan as Meuternder Korporal
- Anton Pointner
- Hugo Flink
- Albert von Kersten
- Gerhard Haselbach
- Albert Hugelmann
- Erich Fiedler as Lakai im Konak

== See also ==
- The Standard (1977)

== Bibliography ==
- Noack, Frank. Veit Harlan: The Life and Work of a Nazi Filmmaker. University Press of Kentucky, 2016.
- Waldman, Harry. Nazi Films in America, 1933–1942. McFarland, 2008.
