= Helmut Ashley =

Austrian filmmaker (1919 - 2021)

- Born: 17 September 1919; Vienna, Austria
- Died: 2 July 2021 (aged 101); Munich, Germany
- Occupation: Film director
- Years active: 1948–2005

Helmut Ashley or Helmuth Ashley (17 September 1919 – 2 July 2021) was an Austrian cinematographer, television and film director.

Ashley turned 100 in September 2019 and died in Munich in July 2021, at the age of 101.

== Selected filmography ==
Film

- Duel with Death (directed by Paul May, 1949)
- White Shadows (directed by Helmut Käutner, 1951)
- All Clues Lead to Berlin (directed by František Čáp, 1952)
- Vanished Melody (1952)
- Captive Soul (directed by Hans Wolff, 1952)
- Adventure in Vienna (directed by Emil-Edwin Reinert, 1952)
- Stolen Identity (directed by Gunther von Fritsch, 1953)
- Must We Get Divorced? (directed by Hans Schweikart, 1953)
- Confession Under Four Eyes (1954)
- You Can No Longer Remain Silent (directed by Robert A. Stemmle, 1955)
- Alibi (1955)
- Stopover in Orly (1955)
- Regine (directed by Harald Braun, 1956)
- Nina (1956)
- Der Stern von Afrika (directed by Alfred Weidenmann, 1957)
- Das schwarze Schaf (1960)
- My Schoolfriend (1960)
- Murder Party (1961)
- The Puzzle of the Red Orchid (1962)
- Mystery of the Red Jungle (1964)
- Die Rechnung – eiskalt serviert (1966)
- No Time to Die (1984)

Television

- Das Kriminalmuseum (1963–1968, TV series, 13 episodes)
- Nachtzug D 106 (1964)
- Oberst Wennerström (1965)
- Das Millionending (1966)
- Kidnap – Die Entführung des Lindbergh-Babys (1968)
- Kim Philby war der dritte Mann (1969)
- Der Portland-Ring (1970)
- Die Münchner Räterepublik (1971)
- The Three Faces of Tamara Bunke (1971)
- Ferdinand Lassalle (1972)
- Der Kommissar (1974–1975, TV series, 4 episodes)
- Derrick (1975–1997, TV series, 46 episodes)
- Notarztwagen 7 (1976–1977, TV series, 13 episodes)
- The Old Fox (1978–2005, TV series, 55 episodes)
- Mutter, ich will nicht sterben! (1994)
