= The Fourth Commandment (1950 film) =

1950 film

- Theatrical release poster by Paul Aigner
- Directed by: Eduard von Borsody
- Written by: Friedrich Schreyvogel; Eduard von Borsody
- Based on: The Fourth Commandment by Ludwig Anzengruber
- Produced by: Eduard Hoesch
- Starring: Attila Hörbiger; Dagny Servaes; Inge Egger
- Cinematography: Sepp Ketterer; Hans Schneeberger
- Music by: Wolfgang Ruß-Bovelino
- Production companies: Berna Filmproduktion; Donau-Filmproduktion
- Distributed by: Sascha Film
- Release date: 7 April 1950
- Running time: 100 minutes
- Country: Austria
- Language: German

The Fourth Commandment (German: Das vierte Gebot) is a 1950 Austrian historical drama film directed by Eduard von Borsody and starring Attila Hörbiger, Dagny Servaes and Inge Egger. It was shot at the Sievering Studios and on location in the Vienna Woods. The film's sets were designed by the art director Gustav Abel. It was released in West Germany the same year by Union Film. It is based in the 1878 play of the same name by Ludwig Anzengruber.

== Synopsis ==
A once prosperous craftsman in late nineteenth century Vienna finds himself and his family in increasing financial difficulties due to the industrialisation that has damaged his business.

== Cast ==
- Attila Hörbiger as Schalanter
- Dagny Servaes as Barbara Schalanter – seine Frau
- Hans Putz as Martin Schalanter – beider Sohn
- Inge Egger as Josefa Schalanter – beider Tochter
- Auguste Welten as Großmutter Herwig
- Alfred Neugebauer as Hutterer – Hausbesitzer
- Alma Seidler as Sidonie Hutterer – seine Frau
- Brigitte Ratz as Hedwig Hutterer – beider Tochter
- Fritz Imhoff as Stolzenthaler sen.
- Erik Frey as August Stolzenthaler – sein Sohn
- Karl Skraup as Hausbesorger Schön
- Annie Rosar as Anna Schön – seine Frau
- Erich Auer as Eduard Schön – beider Sohn – Priester
- Carl Bosse as Robert Frey
- Leopold Rudolf as Gehilfe Johann
- Arthur Popp as Gehilfe Karl

== Bibliography ==
- Fritsche, Maria. Homemade Men in Postwar Austrian Cinema: Nationhood, Genre and Masculinity. Berghahn Books, 2013.
