= Michael Janisch (actor) =

Austrian actor (1927–2004)

- Born: 21 July 1927; Vienna, Austria
- Died: 29 November 2004 (aged 77); Vienna, Austria
- Occupation: Actor
- Years active: 1951–2003

Michael Janisch (21 July 1927 – 29 November 2004) was an Austrian actor. He is best known as Inspektor Fichtl in Tatort.

== Partial filmography ==
- Gangsterpremiere (1951) - Ferry
- Anna Louise and Anton (1953) - Hollack - Chauffeur
- Daughter of the Regiment (1953) - Karl
- Franz Schubert (1953) - Bergmann
- Schicksal am Lenkrad (1954) - Gendarmerie-Postenkommandant
- Maxie (1954)
- The Last Ten Days (1955)
- Her First Date (1955) - Taxichauffeur
- His Daughter is Called Peter (1955) - der Autofahrer
- A Girl Without Boundaries (1955) - Olaf Haagerlund
- 08/15 at Home (1955) - Oberleutnant Griefer
- Wilhelm Tell (1956) - Konrad Baumgarten
- Flucht in die Tropennacht (1957) - Johnny
- Eva küßt nur Direktoren (1958)
- Einmal noch die Heimat seh'n (1958) - Robert
- The Journey (1959) - Russian Officer lighting Paul Kedes' cigarette (uncredited)
- Auf allen Straßen (1959) - Carlo Carlotti, ehem. Fahrradclown
- Der Schatz vom Toplitzsee (1959)
- Frauen in Teufels Hand (1960) - Hauptmann Balke
- The Good Soldier Schweik (1960) - Russian Soldier Ballun
- Twenty Brave Men (1960) - Jannis
- Miracle of the White Stallions (1963) - Refugee Leader
- An Alibi for Death (1963) - Martin Siebeck
- Die ganze Welt ist himmelblau (1964)
- Heidi (1965) - Johann
- Killer's Carnival (1966) - Kurt Waldeck (Vienna segment) (uncredited)
- Und Jimmy ging zum Regenbogen (1971) - Clairon
- The Vampire Happening (1971) - Handwerker
- Sie nannten ihn Krambambuli (1972) - Polizist Dr. Lambrecht
- Der letzte Werkelmann (1972) - Holländer
- Trip to Vienna (1973) - Major Kopp
- The Girl from Petrovka (1974) - Police Chief Valinikov
- Four of the Apocalypse (1975) - Altaville Townsman (uncredited)
- Ich will leben (1976) - Antiquitätenhändler
- Bomber & Paganini (1977)
- The Standard (1977) - Orbeliani
- The Fifth Musketeer (1979) - Hauptmann der Gefängniswache
- Die Erben (1983)
- Tödliche Liebe (1995)
