= Rudolf Steinboeck =

- Born: 7 August 1908; Baden bei Wien, Austro-Hungarian Empire
- Died: 19 August 1996 (aged 88); Vienna, Austria
- Occupation: Actor
- Years active: 1937-1986 (film & TV)

Rudolf Steinboeck (1908–1996) was an Austrian theatre actor and director. He also directed and acted in several films. He was married to the actress Aglaja Schmid.

He headed the Theater in der Josefstadt in Vienna from 1945 to 1953.

== Selected filmography ==
- The Priest from Kirchfeld (1937)
- The Other Life (1948)
- Dear Friend (1949)

== Bibliography ==
- Fritsche, Maria. Homemade Men In Postwar Austrian Cinema: Nationhood, Genre and Masculinity . Berghahn Books, 2013.
