= Donald Buka =

American actor (1920–2009)

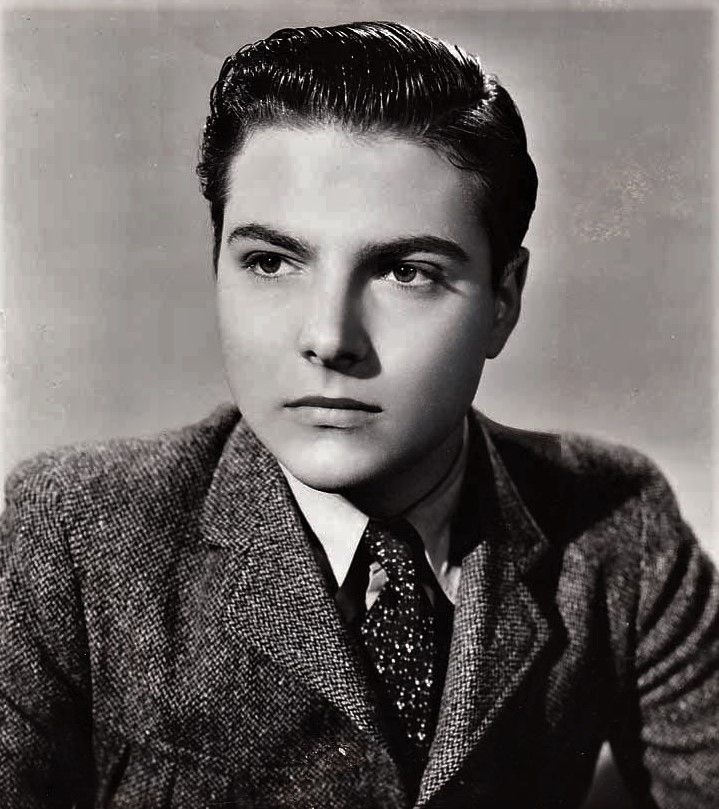
- Buka in 1943
- Born: August 17, 1920; Cleveland, Ohio, U.S.
- Died: July 21, 2009 (aged 88); Reading, Massachusetts, U.S.
- Occupation: Actor
- Years active: 1943–1987
- Spouse(s): Irene Maskell Mitchell (1968-1968) (divorced); Joy Weber (1972-?) (1 child); Suzanne Sinaiko (1993-1998) (her death)
- Children: 1

Donald Buka (August 17, 1920 – July 21, 2009) was an American supporting actor in radio, films, and television from 1943 to 1971.

== Early years ==
Buka was born on August 17, 1920 in Cleveland, Ohio. When he was age 17, he went to Pittsburgh to study at Carnegie Tech.

== Career ==
While he was at Carnegie Tech, aged 17, Buka read a scene for Alfred Lunt and Lynn Fontanne in an otherwise-empty theater. They invited him to join their company immediately, and he accepted. He toured with them for three years.

Buka had worked on a film for Howard Hughes for three days when Hughes offered him a seven-year contract and told the screenwriter to expand Buka's part for the scenes that had not yet been filmed. Buka agreed to the contract with the stipulation that he be allowed to act on stage during the nine months of the traditional theatrical season each year.

After some early experience in the theater, he got his start in mass media by appearing on the CBS radio program Let's Pretend.

He appeared in episodes of Dragnet, Ironside, Perry Mason, and The High Chaparral.

Buka's Broadway debut came in Twelfth Night (1940). He concluded his Broadway career in Design for Living (1984).

== Death ==
Buka died on July 21, 2009 in Reading, Massachusetts.

== Filmography ==
=== Film ===
Donald Buka Film credits
Year	Title	Role	Notes
1943	Watch on the Rhine	Joshua	
1948	The Street with No Name	Shivvy	
1950	Between Midnight and Dawn	Ritchie Garris	
1950	Vendetta	Padrino, the Bandit	
1951	New Mexico	Private Van Vechton	
1953	Stolen Identity	Toni Sponer	
1961	Operation Eichmann	David	
1964	Shock Treatment	Psychologist	
1970	The Great White Hope	Reporter	uncredited

=== Television ===
Donald Buka Television credits
Year	Title	Role	Notes
1960	Alfred Hitchcock Presents	Man at the door	Episode: "The Cuckoo Clock" (S5.E27)
1964	Perry Mason	Clark	1 episode
1967	Ironside	Vincent Longo	1 episode
1971	A Memory of Two Mondays	Mr. Eagle	TV play
1986	The Equalizer	Ben Carrigan	Episode: "The Line"
