= Stolen Identity =

1953 film by Gunther von Fritsch

- Theatrical release poster
- Directed by: Gunther von Fritsch
- Written by: Robert Hill
- Story by: Alexander Lernet-Holenia (novel I Was Jack Mortimer)
- Produced by: Turhan Bey
- Starring: Donald Buka; Joan Camden; Francis Lederer
- Cinematography: Helmut Ashley
- Music by: Richard Hageman
- Release date: April 3, 1953 (United States)
- Running time: 88 minutes
- Country: Austria
- Language: English

Stolen Identity is a 1953 Austrian film directed by Gunther von Fritsch and starring Donald Buka, Joan Camden and Francis Lederer.

The film is the English-language version of the film Adventure in Vienna (1952), directed by Emil-Edwin Reinert, starring Gustav Fröhlich and Cornell Borchers. Besides the two leading roles the cast of both films is essentially the same.

== Plot ==
Vienna taxi driver Toni Sponer dreams of going to the USA. One day, an American businessman is waiting for his cab, when jealous concert pianist Claude Manelli (Lederer) shoots him dead because he suspected him of having an affair with his American wife Karen (Camden). Toni grabs the dead man's papers and takes over his identity. Later he falls in love with Karen who initially thinks that Toni is the killer but he is able to convince her that he is innocent. Together they try to flee to America with Karen's husband in hot pursuit. Both men are finally captured by the police but Toni receives only a small sentence of a few months in prison. Karen decides to wait for him.

== Cast ==
- Donald Buka as Toni Sponer
- Joan Camden as Karen Manelli
- Francis Lederer as Claude Manelli
- Adrienne Gessner as Mrs. Fraser
- Inge Konradi as Marie
- Hermann Erhardt as Inspector
- Egon von Jordan as Kruger

== Production ==
The film was taken from the Austrian novel Ich war Jack Mortimer (I Was Jack Mortimer), originally written by the film's screenwriter Alexander Lernet-Holenia. The novel was also filmed in an earlier German-language version starring Anton Walbrook.

== Reception ==
The film reportedly paid for itself in Germany.

== See also ==
- I Was Jack Mortimer (1935)
