= Aglaja Schmid =

Austrian actress

- Born: 9 August 1926; Scheibbs, Austria
- Died: 16 December 2003 (aged 77); Vienna, Austria
- Occupation: Actress
- Years active: 1948–1973 (film)

Aglaja Schmid (1926–2003) was an Austrian stage and film actress. She was married to the theatre and film director Rudolf Steinboeck.

== Selected filmography ==
- The Other Life (1948)
- The Trial (1948)
- Dreaming Days (1951)
- My Name is Niki (1952)
- Franz Schubert (1953)
- Daughter of the Regiment (1953)

== Bibliography ==
- Fritsche, Maria (2013). Homemade Men in Postwar Austrian Cinema: Nationhood, Genre and Masculinity. New York: Berghahn Books. ISBN 978-0-85745-946-6.
