= Daybreak (1954 film) =

1954 film directed by Viktor Tourjansky

- Directed by: Viktor Tourjansky
- Written by: Hubert Miketta (novel); Werner P. Zibaso
- Produced by: Franz Seitz
- Starring: Hans Stüwe; Elisabeth Müller; Alexander Kerst
- Cinematography: Friedl Behn-Grund
- Edited by: Margot von Schlieffen
- Music by: Lothar Brühne
- Production company: Ariston Film
- Distributed by: Neue Filmverleih
- Release date: 2 September 1954
- Running time: 100 minutes
- Country: West Germany
- Language: German

Daybreak (German: Morgengrauen) is a 1954 West German drama film directed by Viktor Tourjansky and starring Hans Stüwe, Elisabeth Müller and Alexander Kerst. Filming took place at the Bavaria Studios. It was also shot on location in Munich and Hamburg. The film's sets were designed by the art director Arne Flekstad.

== Synopsis ==
After eight years as a prisoner of war of the Soviets, a German pilot returns home and becomes involved in the scheme to revive German civil aviation with Lufthansa. His new life is threatened, however, when he is put on trial for the execution of a captured British RAF pilot during the war.

== Cast ==
- Hans Stüwe as Oberst Gaffron
- Elisabeth Müller as Inge Jensen
- Alexander Kerst as Jochen Freyberg
- Josef Sieber as Wilheilm Schramm
- Carsta Löck as Amalie Schramm
- Oliver Grimm as Pucky Schramm
- Walter Holten as Von Wakenitz
- Edward P. Merlotte as Colonel Thompson
- Renate Mannhardt as Anita Kyffland
- Gert Fröbe in a bit part
- Paula Braend
- Viktor Afritsch
- Malte Jaeger
- Kurt Großkurth
- Wolfried Lier
- Rudolf Reiff
- John Van Dreelen

== Bibliography ==
- Silberman, Marc (1995). German Cinema: Texts in Context. Wayne State University Press. ISBN 978-0-8143-2560-5.
