= Fritz von Friedl =

Fritz von Friedl may refer to:

- Fritz von Friedl (cinematographer), Austrian cinematographer
- Fritz von Friedl (actor), his son, German-born Austrian actor
