= The Lost One =

1951 film by Peter Lorre

- Directed by: Peter Lorre
- Written by: Peter Lorre; Benno Vigny; Axel Eggebrecht; Helmut Käutner
- Produced by: Arnold Pressburger
- Starring: Peter Lorre; Karl John; Renate Mannhardt; Gisela Trowe
- Cinematography: Václav Vích
- Edited by: Carl Otto Bartning
- Music by: Willy Schmidt-Gentner
- Production company: Arnold Pressburger Filmproduktion
- Distributed by: National-Filmverleih
- Release date: 7 September 1951
- Running time: 98 minutes
- Country: West Germany
- Language: German

The Lost One (German: Der Verlorene) is a 1951 West German crime drama film directed by Peter Lorre and starring Lorre, Karl John and Renate Mannhardt. It is an art film in the film noir style, based on a true story. Lorre wrote, directed, and starred in this film, his only film as director or writer. The film's translated name has been used as the title of his biography.

The film's sets were designed by the art directors Franz Schroedter and Karl Weber. Some scenes were shot at Studio Bendestorf and on provisional stages in the former flak tower on Heiligengeistfeld Hamburg, while location shooting took place around the city.

== Plot ==
Post World War II, the busy doctor Neumeister meets a former colleague again in a refugee camp. The man goes by the name of Novak, but is a wanted Nazi called Hösch. Neumeister has also abandoned his original name, Rothe. The down-and-out Novak hopes for help from the camp doctor, claiming he once did him a favor. In response, Rothe begins to recount their shared history during the Nazi era.

The story flashes back to Hamburg in December 1943, during the war. Dr. Rothe is a serum researcher whose work is top secret and vital to the war effort for the Nazis. His fiancée Inge spies on his research and starts an affair with Rothe’s colleague Hösch, who was planted in the laboratory by the Abwehr (German military intelligence). When Rothe discovers her betrayal, he kills her in a fit of rage.

Because his work is valuable to them, the Nazis do not want to prosecute Rothe, even though he feels deeply guilty. Hösch covers for him, preventing Dr. Rothe’s conviction. In a mixture of disgust, world-weariness, and guilt, Rothe then murders another woman when she tries to seduce him in an empty S-Bahn train during an air raid.

Feeling like a monster, Rothe decides to kill himself — but first he wants to shoot Hösch and his superior, Colonel Winkler, for covering up his doings. When he arrives at Colonel Winkler’s villa, he discovers that Winkler is working with a resistance group to carry out an assassination attempt against the Nazis. By showing up, Rothe has unwittingly put Hösch on the trail of the group. Hösch has the resistance crushed, and Colonel Winkler is hanged.

Meanwhile, Rothe's flat is destroyed in a bombing raid, killing his young lodger Ursula and Inge's mother. Rothe uses the destruction to easily fake his own death, and Hösch stops searching for the scientist.

Back in the present at the refugee camp, Rothe believes he has finally found someone in Hösch who can understand his psychological torment. However, Hösch has not changed at all. He considers Rothe's feelings of guilt laughable. Instead, he brags about the murder of Colonel Winkler and wants to leave the past behind without remorse. Rothe then shoots Hösch and subsequently kills himself by stepping in front of a train.

== Main cast ==
- Peter Lorre as Dr. Karl Rothe, alias Dr. Karl Neumeister
- Karl John as Hösch, alias Nowak
- Helmuth Rudolph as Colonel Winkler
- Renate Mannhardt as Inge Hermann
- Johanna Hofer as Frau Hermann, Inge's mother
- Eva Ingeborg Scholz as Ursula Weber
- Lotte Rausch as Woman on Train
- Gisela Trowe as Prostitute
- Hansi Wendler as Rothe's Secretary
- Kurt Meister as Preefke
- Alexander Hunzinger as Drunk

== Reception ==
The film was unsuccessful with most of the German audiences in the 1950s, who tried to forget the Nazi era and preferred Heimatfilm. Der Verlorene has since achieved more recognition.
