= Wedding Bells (1954 film) =

1954 film

- Directed by: Georg Wildhagen
- Written by: Werner Hill (story); Wolf Neumeister
- Produced by: Helmut Beck
- Starring: Marianne Hold; Renate Mannhardt; Jan Hendriks
- Cinematography: Georg Krause
- Edited by: Max Michel; Herbert Taschner
- Music by: Herbert Jarczyk
- Production company: Interlux-Film
- Distributed by: Union-Film
- Release date: 15 January 1954
- Running time: 85 minutes
- Country: West Germany
- Language: German

Wedding Bells (German: Hochzeitsglocken) is a 1954 West German drama film directed by Georg Wildhagen and starring Marianne Hold, Renate Mannhardt, and Jan Hendriks. It was shot at the Bendestorf Studios near Hamburg and on location around Starnberg, Feldafing and the Ammersee in Bavaria. The film's sets were designed by the art director Robert Herlth.

== Cast ==
- Marianne Hold as Katharina Ditmar
- Renate Mannhardt as Irene von Straaten
- Jan Hendriks as Philipp Harding
- Erwin Strahl
- Carl Wery as Arnold Ditmar
- Beppo Brem as Franz
- Elisabeth Flickenschildt as Valesca Lautenschläger
- Albert Florath as Sebastian Eckhoff
- Ida Krottendorf as Annelie Brox
- Anna Lange
- Gunnar Möller as Klaus Eckhoff
- Elfie Pertramer
- Bobby Todd as von Kleewitz

== Bibliography ==
- Bock, Hans-Michael; Bergfelder, Tim, eds. (2009). The Concise Cinegraph: Encyclopaedia of German Cinema. New York: Berghahn Books. ISBN 978-1-57181-655-9.
