= Threepenny Opera =

Threepenny Opera or Three Penny Opera may refer to:

- The Threepenny Opera, a 1928 German "play with music" by Bertolt Brecht and Kurt Weill
- The Threepenny Opera (1931 film), a film adaptation
- The Threepenny Opera (1963 film), a West German film adaptation directed by Wolfgang Staudte
