= Alexander Kerst =

Austrian actor

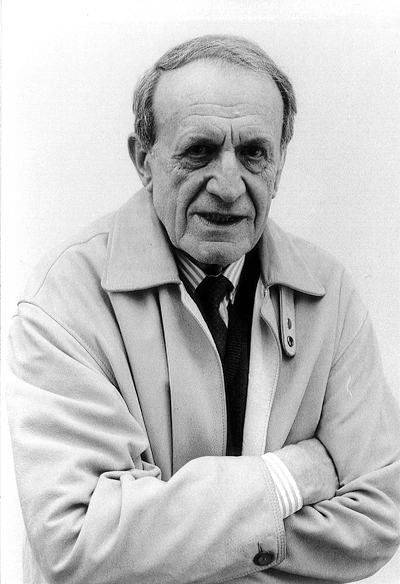
Alexander Kerst

Alexander Kerst (23 February 1924 – 9 December 2010) was an Austrian television actor.

He was born in Kralupy nad Vltavou, Czechoslovakia and died in Munich, Germany.

== Selected filmography ==
Year	Title	Role	Notes
1952	Adventure in Vienna	2. Polizist auf der Wache	
1953	Flucht ins Schilf	Alexander Riss	
1954	Daybreak	Jochen Freyberg	
1955	Island of the Dead	Dr. Henry Gordon	
1955	Ciske de Rat	Herr Freimuth	
1955	Lost Child 312	Achim Lenau	
1956	Beichtgeheimnis	Prosecutor	
1956	Beloved Corinna	Dr. Suter	
1957	Der Stern von Afrika	Major Niemeyer	
1958	Madeleine Tel. 13 62 11	Gert Kleiber - Architect	
1959	Stalingrad: Dogs, Do You Want to Live Forever?	Kriegspfarrer Busch	
1959	Glück und Liebe in Monaco	Chefredakteur	
1960	My Schoolfriend	Hauptmann Sander	
1963	Jack and Jenny		
1964–1967	Gewagtes Spiel	Dr. Severin	TV Series, 26 episodes
1966	Maigret and His Greatest Case	André Delfosse	
1967	Kurzer Prozess	Wolfert	
1967	Forty Eight Hours to Acapulco	Vater Gruner	
1971	Das Messer	Colonel Green	TV miniseries
1975–1992	Derrick	Alfred Reimann / Herr Friess / Herr Stössl / Herr Wegmann	TV Series, 4 episodes
1980	Why the UFOs Steal Our Lettuce	U.S. General	
1983	S.A.S. à San Salvador	David Wise	
1985	Mary Ward	Kardinal Borgia	
1985	The Holcroft Covenant	Gen. Heinrich Clausen	
1988	Geheime Reichssache	Werner von Blomberg	TV film
1991	Young Catherine	Prussian Ambassador	TV film
1993	Clara	Heinrich Bartels	TV miniseries
