= Heartbroken on the Moselle =

1953 film

- Directed by: Kurt Hoffmann
- Written by: Rudolf G. Binding (novel); Ilse Lotz-Dupont
- Produced by: Jochen Genzow
- Starring: Will Quadflieg; Elisabeth Müller; Oliver Grimm
- Cinematography: Heinz Schnackertz
- Edited by: Elisabeth Kleinert-Neumann
- Music by: Johannes Weissenbach
- Production company: Ariston Film
- Distributed by: Columbia Film
- Release date: 12 November 1953
- Running time: 81 minutes
- Country: West Germany
- Language: German

Heartbroken on the Moselle (German: Moselfahrt aus Liebeskummer) is a 1953 West German romantic comedy film directed by Kurt Hoffmann and starring Will Quadflieg, Elisabeth Müller, and Oliver Grimm. It was based on a 1932 novella by Rudolf G. Binding. It was shot at the Bavaria Studios in Munich with outdoor filming in Bayreuth in Bavaria and at various locations in the Rhineland. The film's sets were designed by the art director Rudi Remp.

== Cast ==
- Will Quadflieg as Dr. Thomas Arend
- Elisabeth Müller as Angela Schaefer
- Oliver Grimm as Kaspar Schäfer
- Renate Mannhardt as Dorette Sorel
- John Van Dreelen as Bernd Zagler
- Franziska Kinz as Maria Klaus
- Albert Florath as Zyprian
- Erica Beer as Sylvie
- Rudolf Reiff as Küfermeister Kuby
- Bum Krüger as Weinkenner

== Bibliography ==
- Bock, Hans-Michael; Bergfelder, Tim, eds. (2009). The Concise Cinegraph: Encyclopaedia of German Cinema. New York: Berghahn Books. ISBN 978-1-57181-655-9.
- Goble, Alan (1999). The Complete Index to Literary Sources in Film. Berlin: Walter de Gruyter. ISBN 978-3-11-095194-3.
- Rentschler, Eric, ed. (2013). German Film and Literature: Adaptations and Transformations. Hoboken, NJ: Taylor & Francis. ISBN 978-1-136-36873-8.
