= Schwanneke =

Schwanneke is a German surname. Notable people with the surname include:

- Ellen Schwanneke (1906–1972), German dancer and actress
- Viktor Schwanneke (1880–1931), German director, writer, and actor
