= Not a Word About Love =

1937 film by Miroslav Cikán

- Directed by: Miroslav Cikán; Alwin Elling
- Written by: Hans Regina von Nack
- Screenplay by: Erwin Kreker
- Starring: Ellen Schwanneke; Rolf Wanka; Richard Romanowsky
- Cinematography: Ferdinand Pečenka
- Music by: Jára Benes
- Production companies: Metropolitan Film; Lloyd Film
- Release date: 3 December 1937
- Running time: 87 minutes
- Countries: Czechoslovakia; Germany
- Language: German

Not a Word About Love (German: Kein Wort von Liebe) is a 1937 Czechoslovak-German romantic comedy film directed by Miroslav Cikán and Alwin Elling and starring Ellen Schwanneke, Rolf Wanka and Richard Romanowsky. It is the German-language version of Poslíček lásky.

== Plot ==
The secretary of a journalist habitually crossdresses as a man to research undercover. She is hired, as a man, by a dress manufacturer who suspects he's the victim of industrial espionage. At the dress factory she catches an intern photographing the new designs. The intern quickly throws the camera out a window and frames the undercover agent as the spy. To complicate everything, the industrialist encounters his agent off-duty in a café and, not recognizing her, falls in love with her as a woman.

== Cast ==
- Ellen Schwanneke as Steffie Leutner - Stenotypistin
- Rolf Wanka as Hubert Kersten - Modeschöpfer
- Richard Romanowsky as Erasmus Stössel - Bürovorsteher
- Margit Symo as Stascha
- Hans Hermann Schaufuß as Leutner / Uhrmacher / Steffis Vater
- Erich Fiedler as Treff - Reporter
- Walter Szurovy as Fred Curry
- Marion Wünsche as Gerda - Steffis Freundin
- Elisabeth Wolf as Stenotypistin bei Kersten

== Bibliography ==
- Waldman, Harry. Nazi Films in America, 1933-1942. McFarland, 2008.
