= Under the Pavement Lies the Strand =

- DVD cover
- Directed by: Helma Sanders-Brahms
- Written by: Heinrich Giskes; Grischa Huber; Helma Sanders-Brahms
- Produced by: Helma Sanders-Brahms; Eckart Stein
- Narrated by: Helma Sanders-Brahms
- Cinematography: Thomas Mauch
- Edited by: Elfie Tillack
- Music by: Wolfgang Amadeus Mozart
- Production companies: Helma Sanders-Brahms Filmproduktion; ZDF
- Release date: 14 January 1975
- Running time: 106 minutes
- Country: Germany
- Language: German

Under the Pavement Lies the Strand (German: Unter dem Pflaster ist der Strand) is a 1975 West German black and white drama film directed by Helma Sanders-Brahms. This low-budget film was her first feature film. Prior to making the film, Sanders-Brahms had little to no distinct contact with the women's rights movement.

== Plot ==
The film deals with the aftermath of the 1968 student rebellions in Germany as experienced by two fervent participants. Though the country experienced sweeping reforms in the years following, two radicals-turned-successful Berlin stage actors and lovers grapple with their growing insignificance and the demands of adulthood. After a night of intense debate about the past and their future, the couple begins garnering support to fight a new abortion bill. However, their rekindled zeal is complicated by an unexpected pregnancy.

== Cast ==
- Grischa Huber as Grischa
- Heinrich Giskes as Heinrich
- Ursula von Berg as Berlin Woman
- Gesine Strempel as Berlin Woman
- Traute Klier-Siebert as Berlin Woman
- Barbara Finkenstädt as Berlin Woman
- Heinz Hoenig
- Günter Lampe

== Release ==
The film was released on DVD by Facets Multi-Media in 2008.

== Reception ==
Wendy Ellen Everett and Axel Goodbody, editors of Revisiting Space: Space and Place in European Cinema, said that it "became a cult film in the German feminist movement." The film's main actress and actor won the Deutscher Filmpreis (Filmband in Gold) in 1975 and it was called one of Sanders-Brahms' best films by Salon critic Andrew O'Hehir. PopMatters critic Stuart Henderson referred to the film as a "revelation" and "fascinating and important film." The Philadelphia City Paper stated that the film was "hailed as a cult film for the feminist movement."
