= Harmstorf =

- Municipality
- Coat of arms

- Location of Harmstorf within Harburg district
- Interactive map of Harmstorf
- Location within Germany Location within Lower Saxony
- Coordinates: 53°21′N 09°59′E
- Country: Germany
- State: Lower Saxony
- District: Harburg
- Municipal assoc.: Jesteburg

Government
  - Mayor: Andreas Maack

Area
  - Total: 5.97 km^{2} (2.31 sq mi)
- Elevation: 15 m (49 ft)

Population (2025-12-31)
  - Total: 811
  - Density: 136/km^{2} (352/sq mi)
- Time zone: UTC+01:00 (CET)
  - Summer (DST): UTC+02:00 (CEST)
- Postal codes: 21228
- Dialling codes: 04105
- Vehicle registration: WL
- Website: Gemeinde Harmstorf

Harmstorf is a municipality in the district of Harburg, in Lower Saxony, Germany.
