= Alwin Elling =

German film director

- Born: 20 April 1897; Hanover, German Empire
- Died: 7 November 1973 (aged 76); Hanover, West Germany
- Occupations: Director Editor, Screenwriter
- Years active: 1930–1958 (film)

Alwin Elling (1897-1973) was a German film director and editor.

== Selected filmography ==
=== Editor ===
- Die lustigen Musikanten (1930)
- Gloria (1931)
- The Squeaker (1931)
- Melody of Love (1932)
- Ein Walzer für dich (1934)
- The Black Whale (1934)
- The Cossack and the Nightingale (1935)
- Eva (1935)

=== Director ===
- Orders Are Orders (1936)
- Der lustige Witwenball (1936)
- Carousel (1937)
- Not a Word About Love (1937)
- Meine Frau, die Perle (1937)
- Little County Court (1938)
- Ehe man Ehemann wird (1941)
- The Crazy Clinic (1954)

== Bibliography ==
- Bruns, Jana Francesca . Nazi Cinema's New Women: Marika Roekk, Zarah Leander, Kristina Soederbaum. Stanford University, 2002.
- Niven, Bill, Hitler and Film: The Führer's Hidden Passion. Yale University Press, 2018.
- Waldman, Harry. Nazi Films In America, 1933-1942. McFarland & Co, 2008.
