= Renate Mannhardt =

German actress

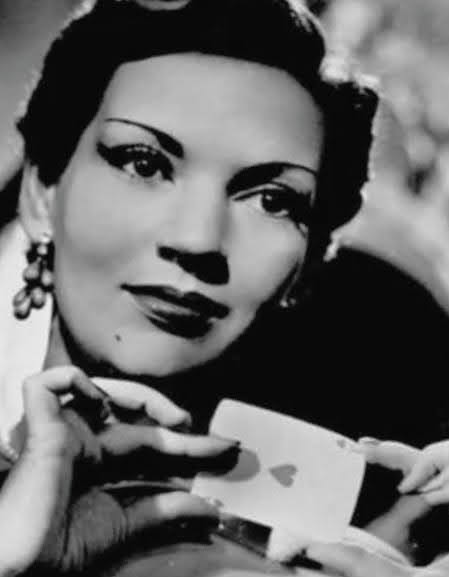
- Mannhardt in a publicity photo c. 1953
- Born: 20 November 1920; Barmen, Weimar Republic
- Died: 22 June 2013 (aged 92); Annalong, Northern Ireland
- Other name: Renata Mooney
- Occupation: Actress
- Years active: 1941–1976 (film)

Renate Mannhardt (1920–2013), born Renate Kohlstein, was a German actress, tutor, and artist. She starred in Peter Lorre's 1951 film The Lost One, and starred alongside Ingrid Bergman in Roberto Rossellini's film Fear (1954 film). As an acting tutor, she briefly taught Robert De Niro, and in her later years was a prolific painter, exhibiting in Ireland and abroad.

== Filmography ==
Year	Title	Role	Notes
1941	Goodbye, Franziska	Die exotische Tänzerin	Uncredited
1943	Geliebter Schatz		
1945	Via Mala	Kuni	
1949	After the Rain Comes Sunshine	Renate	
1950	A Day Will Come	Louise	
1950	The Falling Star	Trude	
1951	The Lost One	Inge Hermann	
1951	Wild West in Upper Bavaria	Vevi - ihre Tochter	
1952	Heimat Bells	Zenzi	
1952	The Great Temptation	Sylva	
1953	Captain Bay-Bay	Manuela	
1953	The Village Under the Sky	Anja, Dorfwirtin	
1953	Josef the Chaste	Pussy Angor	
1953	The Poacher	Kathrin Sedlmaier	
1953	Heartbroken on the Moselle	Dorette Sorel	
1954	Wedding Bells	Irene von Straaten	
1954	Daybreak	Anita Kyffland	
1954	The Sinful Village	Afra Vogelhuber - Tochter	
1954	Fear (La Paura)	Luisa Vidor aka Johanna Schultze	
1954	The Confession of Ina Kahr		
1955	Operation Sleeping Bag	Renate Kern	
1955	Versuchung	Yvonne Gaubert	
1956	The Marriage of Doctor Danwitz	Hilde - Laborantin	
1956	The River Changes	Leah	
1956	Zu Befehl, Frau Feldwebel	Eva Knoblauch	
1957	Rot ist die Liebe	Frau Droege	
1960	Willy the Private Detective	Erna Knörschkes	
1961	The Big Show	Teresa Vizzini	
1976	Mastermind	Bertha Tors	(final film role)

== Bibliography ==
- Thomas, Sarah (2012). Peter Lorre: Face Maker: Constructing Stardom and Performance in Hollywood and Europe. New York: Berghahn Books. ISBN 978-0-85745-441-6.
