= Kurt Heintel =

Austrian actor

- Born: 24 November 1924; Vienna, Austria
- Died: 10 December 2002 (aged 78); Vienna, Austria
- Occupation: Actor
- Years active: 1949–1993 (film & TV)

Kurt Heintel (1924–2002) was an Austrian film and television actor.

== Selected filmography ==
- Vagabonds (1949)
- A Devil of a Woman (1951)
- Hannerl (1952)
- The Monastery's Hunter (1953)
- The Poacher (1953)
- The Last Reserves (1953)
- The Red Prince (1954)
- As Long as You Live (1955)
- The Song of Kaprun (1955)
- The Story of Anastasia (1956)
- War of the Maidens (1957)
- Jedermann (1961)
- Help, My Bride Steals (1964)
- Duel at Sundown (1965)

== Bibliography ==
- Fritsche, Maria (2013). Homemade Men in Postwar Austrian Cinema: Nationhood, Genre and Masculinity. New York: Berghahn Books. ISBN 978-0-85745-946-6.
