= Sin with a Discount =

1968 film

- Directed by: Rudolf Lubowski
- Written by: Margarethe Reinhardt; Rudolf Lubowski
- Produced by: Gunter Otto; Alois Brummer
- Starring: Claus Holm; Rolf Wanka; Adrian Hoven
- Cinematography: Gunter Otto
- Edited by: Christina Heinle
- Music by: Beni Gebauer
- Production companies: Gopa-Film; Reinhardt-Film-Produktion
- Distributed by: AB Filmverleih
- Release date: 22 March 1968
- Running time: 88 minutes
- Country: West Germany
- Language: German

Sin with a Discount (German: Sünde mit Rabatt) is a 1968 West German crime drama film directed by Rudolf Lubowski and starring Claus Holm, Rolf Wanka and Adrian Hoven. It was part of a growing trend towards lower-budget exploitation films in German cinema of the era.

== Synopsis ==
Martina one of the prostitutes who works at the Apollo, a strip club and brothel, is discovered murdered in the woods outside the city. Kriminalkommissar Weber takes on the case and at first suspects her pimp, but he proves to have an alibi. Meanwhile alarm grows amongst the woman of the Apollo who fear they will be next.

== Cast ==
- Claus Holm as Kriminalkommissar Weber
- Sylvia Frank as Silvia
- Nino Korda as Fred
- Paula Braend as Luise Berten
- Eva Astor as Martina
- Rolf Wanka as Kurt
- Adrian Hoven as Arzt
- Li Menon as Inge
- Werner Cartano as Kriminalassistent Kleinlein
- Annamarie Dick as Lissy
- Kurt Horanek as Willy
- Renate Pichler as Vera
- Joachim Reinecke as Jürgen
- Mona Baptiste as Monika
- Baldur Seifert as Wenzel
- Christine Schuberth as Doris

== Bibliography ==
- Bergfelder, Tim. International Adventures: German Popular Cinema and European Co-Productions in the 1960s. Berghahn Books, 2005.
- Miersch, Annette. Schulmädchen-Report: der deutsche Sexfilm der 70er Jahre. Bertz, 2003.
