= The Last Reserves =

1953 film

- Directed by: Alfred Lehner
- Written by: Ernest Stefan Nießner
- Produced by: Alfred Lehner
- Starring: Marianne Schönauer; Kurt Heintel; Eduard Köck
- Cinematography: Fritz von Friedl
- Edited by: Renate Knitschke
- Music by: Bert Rudolf
- Production company: Listo Film
- Distributed by: Union Film
- Release date: 16 January 1953
- Running time: 88 minutes
- Country: Austria
- Language: German

The Last Reserves (German: Das letzte Aufgebot) is a 1953 Austrian historical drama film directed by Alfred Lehner and starring Marianne Schönauer, Kurt Heintel and Eduard Köck. It was shot at Ringfilm's Studios in Vienna and on location in Tyrol. The film's sets were designed by the art director Gustav Abel. In West Germany it was released under the alternative title Der Bauernrebell.

== Cast ==
- Marianne Schönauer as Traudi Grabner
- Kurt Heintel as Martin Sellrainer
- Georg Filser as Stefan Sellrainer
- Eduard Köck as Tobias Sellrainer - der alte Bauer
- Margit Seeber as Verena Schneider
- Leopold Rudolf as Raffl
- Hans Brand as Pater Konrad
- Alfred Schnayder as Vinzenz - Gemeindeschreiber
- Hans Raimund Richter as Lukas - Knecht
- Otto Loewe as Andreas Hofer
- Rudolf Vones as Sepp Schneider
- Emmerich Schrenk as Pucher
- Anna Olesk
- Eduard Benoni as Französischer Kurier
- Vera Oelmann
- Fritz von Friedl
- Johannes Ferigo
- Eduard Kautzner
- Albert Rueprecht
- Peter Brand
- Ignaz Fischer
- Greta Georgi

== Bibliography ==
- Fritsche, Maria. Homemade Men in Postwar Austrian Cinema: Nationhood, Genre and Masculinity. Berghahn Books, 2013.
