= Panos Papadopulos =

German-Greek actor

Panos Papadopoulos (Greek: Πάνος Παπαδόπουλος; 1 August 1920, in Kerassus, Ottoman Empire – 18 February 2001, in Munich) was a Greek actor.

== Selected filmography ==
- Hello, Fraulein! (1949) – Musiker
- Jonny Saves Nebrador (1953)
- The Cousin from Nowhere (1953)
- Conchita and the Engineer (1954)
- Beloved Corinna (1956) – Longo
- Lilli (1958) – Gangster Joe
- The Copper (1958) – Heini, der Taschendieb (uncredited)
- Peter Voss, Thief of Millions (1958) – Doctor in Hong Kong (uncredited)
- Der lachende Vagabund (1958)
- Rommel Calls Cairo (1959) – Sharani
- The Tiger of Eschnapur (1959) – Courier (uncredited)
- The Indian Tomb (1959) – Dagh's messenger (uncredited)
- The Death Ship (1959) – Popoff, Bulgarischer Dockarbeiter
- Salem Aleikum (1959)
- Peter Voss, Hero of the Day (1959) – Hoteldiener (uncredited)
- The Crimson Circle (1960) – Matrose Selby
- Weit ist der Weg (1960) – Nelito
- Hotel of Dead Guests (1965) – (uncredited)
- For a Few Dollars More (1965) – Sancho Perez (Indio's Gang)
- Samba (1966, TV film) – Joajo Comes e Silva
- Immer bei Vollmond (1970)
- Goodbye with Mums (1974)
- Derrick: Stiftungsfest (1974, TV series episode) – Nachtportier
- Fedora (1978) – Bartender
- Die Momskys oder Nie wieder Sauerkraut (1981) – Momsky
- Ich bin dein Killer (1982) – Flopp
- Otto – Der Film (1985) – Stavros
