= The Garden (2017 film) =

2017 film

- Directed by: Sonja Maria Kröner
- Written by: Sonja Maria Kröner
- Starring: Laura Tonke
- Release date: 26 June 2017 (Munich IFF)
- Running time: 97 minutes
- Country: Germany
- Language: German

The Garden (German: Sommerhäuser) is a 2017 German drama film directed by Sonja Maria Kröner. It was screened in the Discovery section at the 2017 Toronto International Film Festival.

== Cast ==
- Laura Tonke as Eva
- Mavie Hörbiger as Gitti
- Ursula Werner as Ilse
- Günther Maria Halmer as Erich
- Thomas Loibl as Bernd
- Christine Schorn as Frieda
- Inge Maux as Mathilde
- Johannes Silberschneider as Herr Buchner
- Emilia Pieske as Jana
- Grischa Huber as Frau Fischer
- Elliott Schulte as Lorenz
- Anne-Marie Weisz as Inga
- Jonathan Bähr as Frank
- Katja Brenner as Brigitte Schauer
- Peter Clös as Flachs
