= Jürgen Feindt =

- Born: 14 January 1930; Halberstadt, Germany
- Died: 9 September 1978 (aged 48); Schopfheim, West Germany
- Occupation: Actor
- Years active: 1957–1978 (film and TV)

Jürgen Feindt (1930–1978) was a German dancer, choreographer and actor of stage, film and television.

== Selected filmography ==
- Das haut hin (1957)
- Freddy and the Melody of the Night (1960)
- I Will Always Be Yours (1960)
- We Will Never Part (1960)
- Café Oriental (1962)
- The Threepenny Opera (1963)
- Honour Among Thieves (1966)
- Street Acquaintances of St. Pauli (1968)
- Alpine Glow in Dirndlrock (1974)

== Bibliography ==
- Will Lehman & Margit Grieb. Cultural Perspectives on Film, Literature, and Language. Universal-Publishers, 2010.
