= After the Rain Comes Sunshine =

1949 film directed by Erich Kobler

- Directed by: Erich Kobler
- Written by: Hans Coubier; Erich Kobler; Jo Hanns Rösler; Anton Weber
- Produced by: Otto Lehmann
- Starring: Sonja Ziemann; Gert Fröbe; Rudolf Platte
- Cinematography: Klaus von Rautenfeld
- Edited by: Albert Baumeister
- Music by: Artur Beul; Emil Ferstl
- Production company: Arbeitsgemeinschaft Film
- Distributed by: Emka-Filmverleih
- Release date: 16 December 1949
- Running time: 93 minutes
- Country: West Germany
- Language: German

After the Rain Comes Sunshine (German: Nach Regen scheint Sonne) is a 1949 West German comedy film directed by Erich Kobler and starring Sonja Ziemann, Gert Fröbe and Rudolf Platte. It takes its title from a popular song of the postwar era.

The film's sets were designed by the art director Theo Zwierski.

== Cast ==
- Sonja Ziemann as Sabine
- Gert Fröbe as Konstantin
- Rudolf Platte as Onkel Eduard
- Ralph Lothar as Beni
- Willy Reichert as Der Bürgermeister
- Liesl Karlstadt as Die Bürgermeisterin
- Beppo Brem as Polizist Schneider
- Willi Rose as Hauptwachtmeister
- Gunnar Möller as Polizist Otto
- Gisela von Jagen as Agathe
- Renate Mannhardt as Renate
- Heini Göbel as Der Bandit
- Ellinor von Hartlieb as Babett
- Paula Braend as Paula Buchenau

== Bibliography ==
- Gerald Grote. Der Kommissar: eine Serie und ihre Folgen. Schwarzkopf & Schwarzkopf, 2003.
