= I Know What I'm Living For =

1955 film

- Directed by: Paul Verhoeven
- Written by: Ernst Neubach; Claus Hardt; Margarete Hohoff
- Produced by: Hans Conradi; Ernst Neubach
- Starring: Luise Ullrich; Robert Freitag; Lil Dagover
- Cinematography: Heinz Hölscher
- Edited by: Lieselotte Prattes
- Music by: Anton Profes
- Production company: Neubach Film
- Distributed by: Gloria Film
- Release date: 26 May 1955
- Running time: 100 minutes
- Country: West Germany
- Language: German

I Know What I'm Living For (German: Ich weiß, wofür ich lebe) is a 1955 West German drama film directed by Paul Verhoeven and starring Luise Ullrich, Robert Freitag and Lil Dagover. It was shot at the Bavaria Studios in Munich and on location around Baierbrunn and Garmisch-Partenkirchen. The film's sets were designed by the art directors Ernst H. Albrecht and Paul Markwitz.

== Cast ==
- Luise Ullrich as Maria Pfluger
- Robert Freitag as Peter Neumann, Mechaniker
- Lil Dagover as Alice Lechaudier
- Ruth Stephan as Anna, Wirtschafterin bei Maria
- Ernst Ginsberg as Dr. Grumbach, RA.
- Werner Fuetterer as Dr. Schneider, RA.
- Antonia Mittrowsky as Frl. Fährmann, Jugendfürsogerin
- Gert Fröbe as Pfeifer, Inspektor Jugendfürsorge
- Michael Ande as Pit
- Knut Mahlke as Jascho
- Louise Kleve
- Leo Fischer
- Otto Clemente
- Wolf Ackva
- Hans Henn
- Hans Cossy
- Heinz Peter Scholz
- Otto Brüggemann
- Rudolf Reiff
- Joachim Teege
- Heini Göbel
- Leo Siedler
- Franz Loskarn
- Barbara Gallauner
- Ingeborg Thiede
- Rolf Kralovitz
- Beppo Schwaiger
- Walter Sedlmayr

== Bibliography ==
- Bock, Hans-Michael & Bergfelder, Tim. The Concise CineGraph. Encyclopedia of German Cinema. Berghahn Books, 2009.
- Wolfgram, Mark. "Getting History Right": East and West German Collective Memories of the Holocaust and War. Rowman & Littlefield, 2011.
