= The Red Prince (film) =

1954 film

- Directed by: Hans Schott-Schöbinger; Franz Antel
- Written by: Friedrich Perkonig
- Starring: Inge Egger; Peter Pasetti; Richard Häussler
- Cinematography: Oskar Schnirch; Klaus von Rautenfeld
- Music by: Anton Profes
- Production company: Pabst-Kiba-Filmproduktionsgesellschaft
- Distributed by: Union Film
- Release date: 12 March 1954
- Running time: 90 minutes
- Countries: Austria; West Germany
- Language: German

The Red Prince (German: Der rote Prinz) is a 1954 Austrian-West German historical drama film directed by Hans Schott-Schöbinger and Franz Antel and starring Inge Egger, Peter Pasetti and Richard Häussler. It is based on the story of Archduke Johann Salvator of Austria.

It was shot at the Thalerhof Studios in Graz and on location in a variety of sites including the Schönbrunn Palace, Bad Aussee and Gmunden. The film's sets were designed by the art director Eduard Stolba.

== Synopsis ==
Archduke Johann Salvator, a member of the Habsburg Family and an officer serving in the Austrian Army, causes a scandal by falling in love with and marrying the dancer Milly Stubel. Condemned as insane by his family and confined in the Schloss Ort in rural Austria, he manages to escape with his wife to Genoa where he renounces all his titles and calls himself Johann Orth. They plan to sail away to start a new life away from the conventions of Vienna, but a courtier seeks vengeance on them by plotting to sink their ship.

== Cast ==
- Inge Egger as Milly Stubel
- Peter Pasetti as Johann Orth
- Richard Häussler as Dr. Orbis
- Rolf Wanka as Rittmeister Graf Daun
- Kurt Heintel as Baron Frederik Angelo
- Margrit Aust as Gladys
- Willy Danek as Major Petöfi
- Fritz von Friedl as Clemens Stubel
- Peter Preses as Dr. Haschek
- Alois Stadlmayr as Adam, Schloßverwalter
- Hugo Gottschlich as Andreas Kranzel
- Herbert Herbe as Dr. Davis

== Bibliography ==
- Fritsche, Maria. Homemade Men in Postwar Austrian Cinema: Nationhood, Genre and Masculinity. Berghahn Books, 2013.
