= Jesteburg (Samtgemeinde) =

Samtgemeinde in Lower Saxony, Germany

- Samtgemeinde
- Location of Jesteburg within Harburg district
- Interactive map of Jesteburg
- Location within Germany Location within Lower Saxony
- Coordinates: 53°18′N 9°57′E
- Country: Germany
- State: Lower Saxony
- District: Harburg
- Seat: Jesteburg
- Subdivisions: 3 municipalities

Area
  - Total: 37.91 km^{2} (14.64 sq mi)

Population (2025-12-31)
  - Total: 10,898
  - Density: 287.5/km^{2} (744.5/sq mi)
- Time zone: UTC+01:00 (CET)
  - Summer (DST): UTC+02:00 (CEST)
- Website: www.jesteburg.de

Jesteburg is a Samtgemeinde ("collective municipality") in the district of Harburg, in Lower Saxony, Germany. Its seat is in the village Jesteburg. It consists of the municipalities Bendestorf, Harmstorf and Jesteburg.
