= Marianne Schönauer =

Austrian actress

- Born: 31 May 1920; Vienna, Austria
- Died: 9 July 1997 (aged 77); Vienna, Austria
- Other name: Marianne Schifferes
- Occupations: Actress singer
- Years active: 1936 - 1938 and 1947 – 1997 (theatre and film)

Marianne Schönauer (1920–1997) was an Austrian stage, television and film actress. During her career she made over fifty appearances in film and television series and also enjoyed success as a singer.

== Biography ==
She was born in Vienna as Marianne Schifferes to a Jewish father, Carl Schifferes.

Schönauer emerged as a star of Austrian cinema in the years following the Second World War in films such as G.W. Pabst's The Trial (1948).

"Mandy" married on July 28, 1945 Gustav Manker (1913–1988; divorced on December 19, 1946). In 1958, she had twin daughters "Nani" Marianne and "Feli" Felicitas from an extramarital relationship.

== Selected filmography ==
- The Immortal Face (1947)
- On Resonant Shores (1948)
- The Trial (1948)
- Eroica (1949)
- Wedding with Erika (1950)
- Maria Theresa (1951)
- 1. April 2000 (1952)
- Monks, Girls and Hungarian Soldiers (1952)
- The Poacher (1953)
- The Last Reserves (1953)
- A Night in Venice (1953)
- Bel Ami (1955)
- Don Juan (1955)
- My Daughter Patricia (1959)
- Dance with Me Into the Morning (1962)
- The Black Cobra (1963)
- I Learned It from Father (1964)
- The Fountain of Love (1966)

== Bibliography ==
- Fritsche, Maria. Homemade Men in Postwar Austrian Cinema: Nationhood, Genre and Masculinity. Berghahn Books, 2013.
- Rentschler, Eric. The Films of G.W. Pabst: An Extraterritorial Cinema. Rutgers University Press, 1990.
