= Kunststätte Bossard =

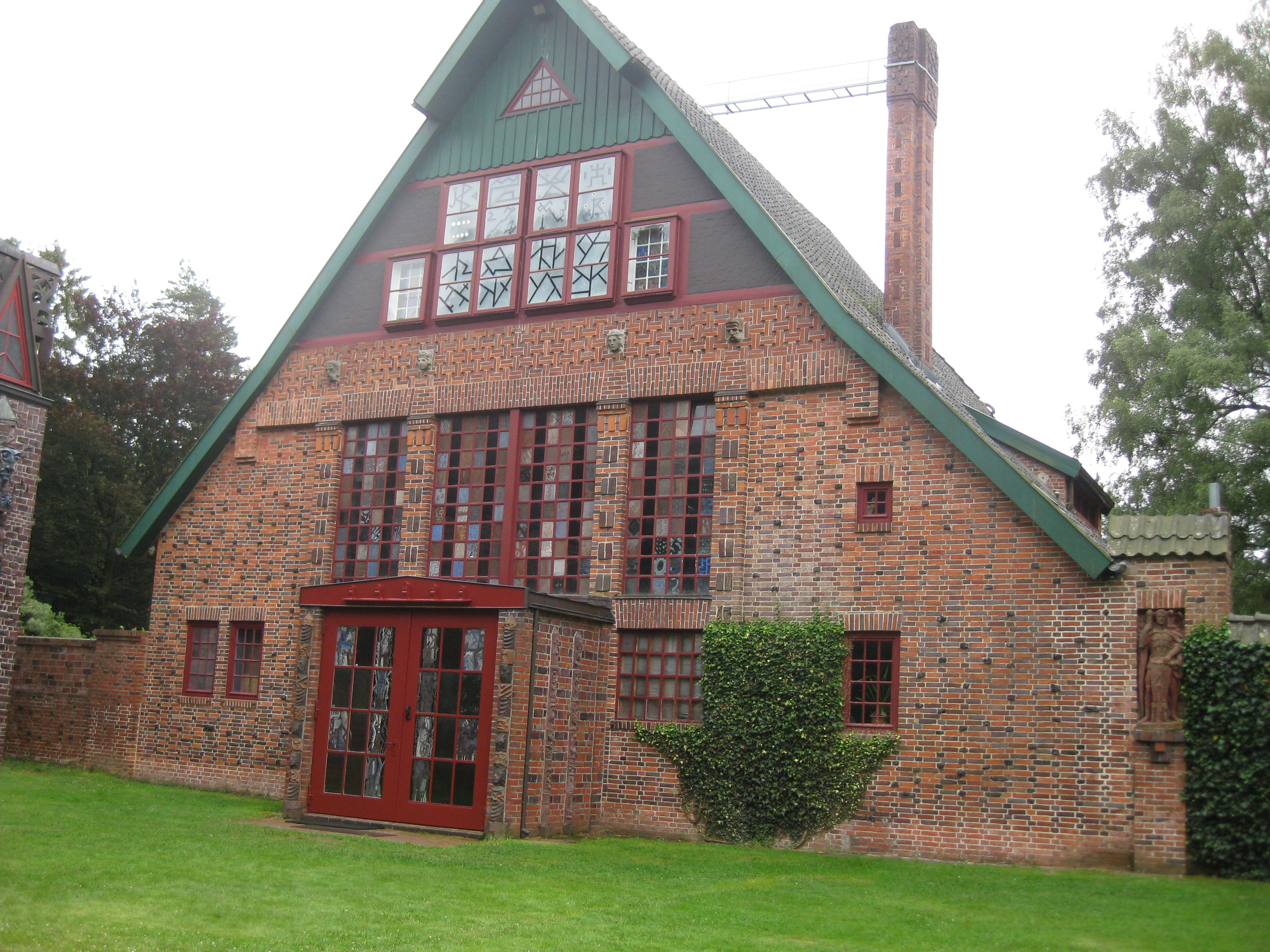
- The Atelierhaus

- Location within Germany
- Location: Bossardweg 95, Jesteburg
- Coordinates: 53.282°N 9.941°E
- Collections: paintings, sculpture
- Owner: Stiftung Kunststätte Johann und Jutta Bossard
- Public transit access: no
- Website: www.bossard.de

Kunststätte Bossard is an expressionist Gesamtkunstwerk, sometimes also referred to as a visionary environment, located in the town of Jesteburg in Lower Saxony, Germany. It was created by Swiss artist Johann Michael Bossard (1874–1950) and his wife, Jutta Kroll-Bossard (1903–1996). It combines architecture, sculpture, painting and garden design.

== History ==
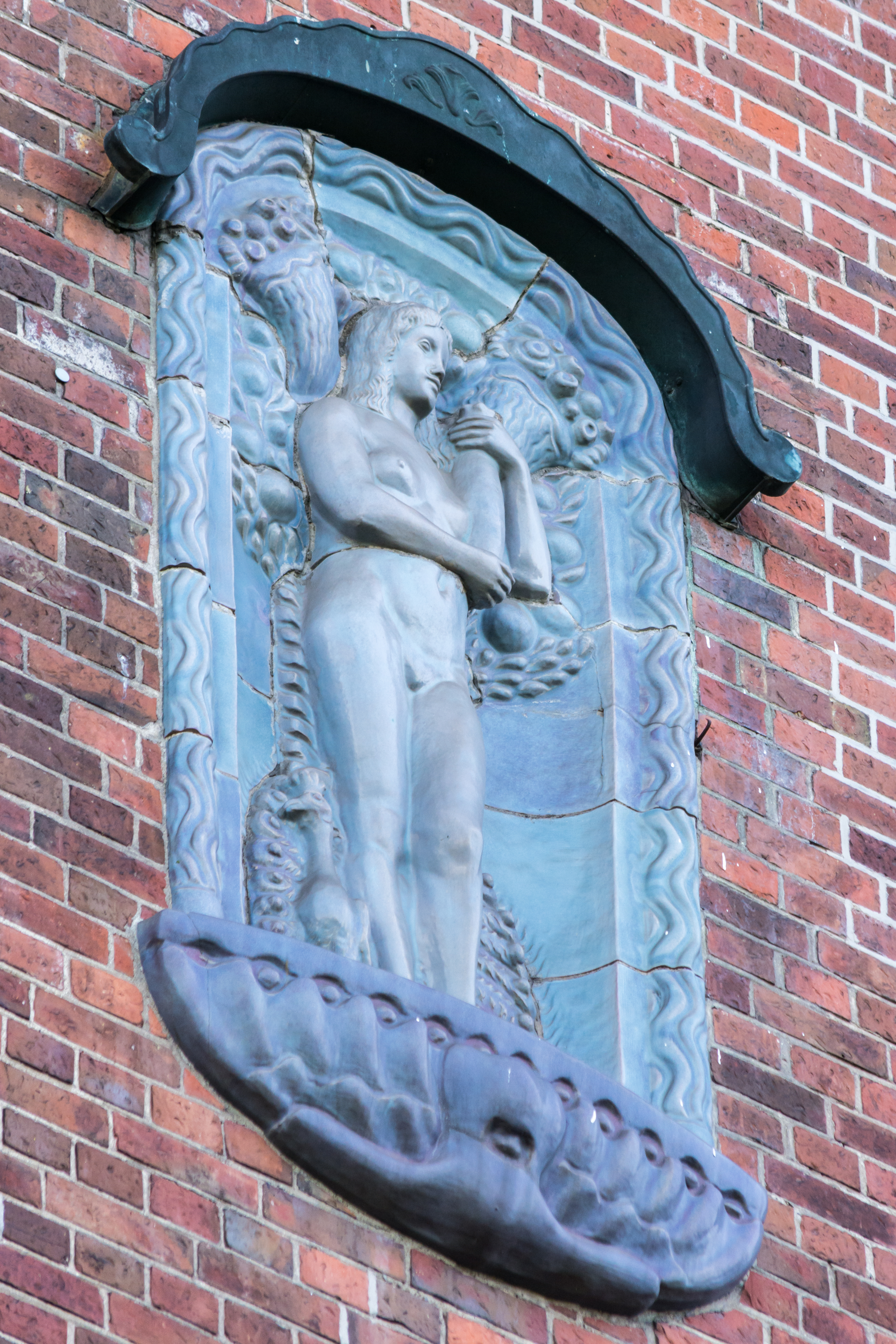
Fortuna, ornamental figure by Bossard on the façade of the Hochschule für Bildende Künste at Hamburg-Uhlenhorst

Johann Michael Bossard was born in Zug, Switzerland in 1874. He was apprenticed as a builder of tiled stoves before studying art at Munich and Berlin. In 1907, he became professor for sculpture at the Kunstgewerbeschule in Hamburg (today the Hochschule für bildende Künste Hamburg), a position he held until his retirement in 1944. Jutta Krull, 29 years his junior, was his student before they married in 1926.

Before 1912, Bossard worked on various pieces of public art, e.g. the façade ornaments of the townhall of Berlin-Treptow (see Rathaus Treptow), the clock face on the Hamburg Stock Exchange or the sculptures on the Völkerkundemuseum of Hamburg.

In 1911, Bossard bought a property in the Lüneburg Heath, near Jesteburg, and – after the end of World War I – started to focus his artistic work on this place. On three hectares of wooded heath, he had a number of structures built to his designs over the next decades, starting with the Atelierhaus in the style of Heimatschutzarchitektur, where he lived. All the interiors, including furniture, paintings, sculptures, ceramics, carpets and tableware were eventually also designed by Bossard himself.

In 1926, work began on the Kunsttempel. The gardens around the buildings were also included in the Gesamtkunstwerk.

Bossard was loath to market or publicise his works. Only after his death in 1950 did his widow strive to make his oevre of over 7,000 works better known.

== Reception ==
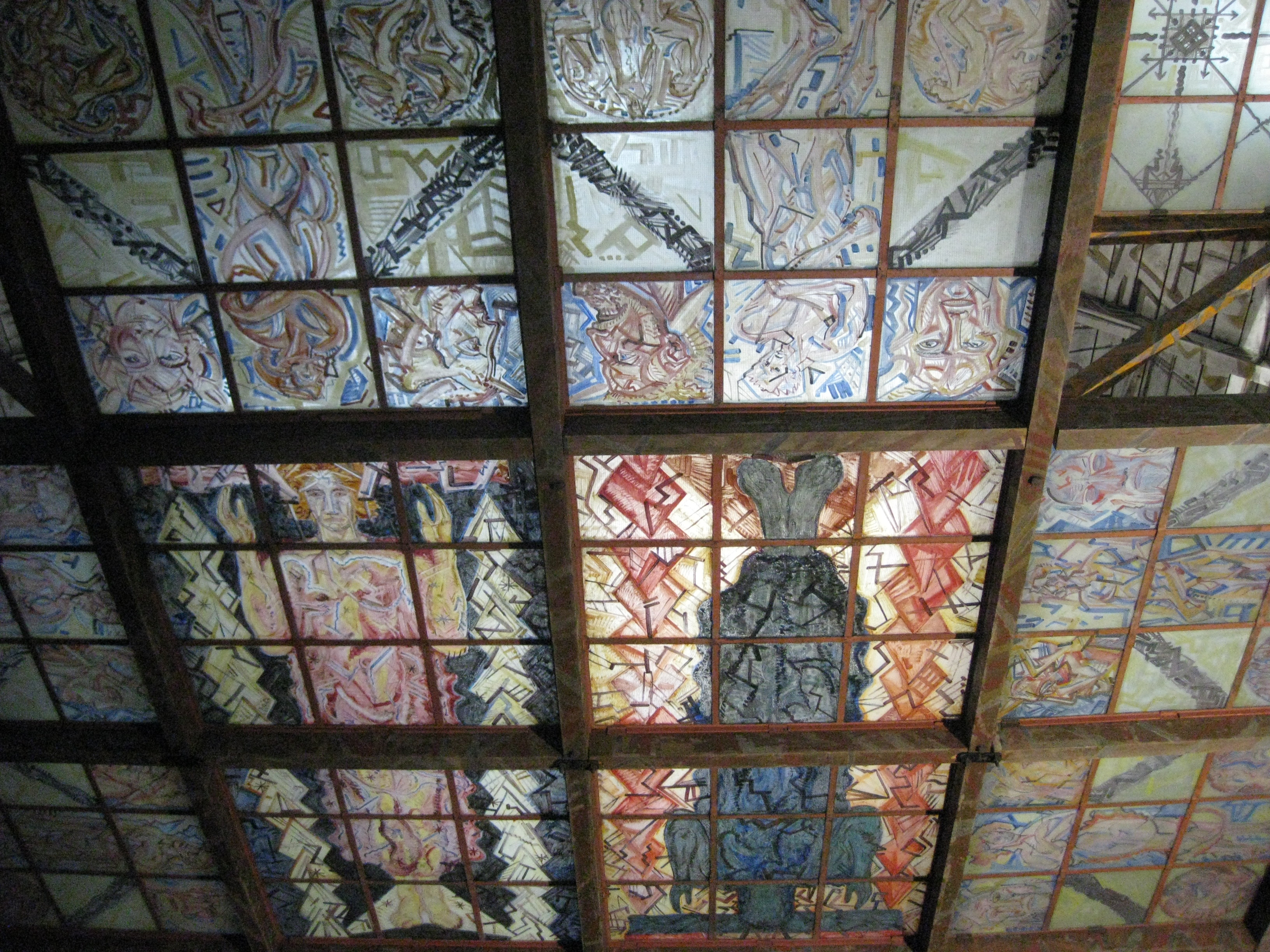
Interior view of the roof of the Kunsttempel

Bossard's work was heavily influenced by Norse mythology. It is deemed unique by art historians, on a par with the expressionist art of Böttcherstrasse at Bremen or the Chilehaus at Hamburg.

In 2012, the Kunststätte was awarded the "Europa Nostra"-price for the preservation of cultural heritage by the European Union.

The site features regularly in guide books to the Lüneburg Heath region.

== Today ==
Jutta Bossard died in 1996 after the Kunststätte had been transferred to the foundation Stiftung Kunststätte Johann und Jutta Bossard in 1995. Today, the foundation continues to operate the site. The Kunststätte is open to the public and offers art classes, guided tours, readings, plays and exhibitions.

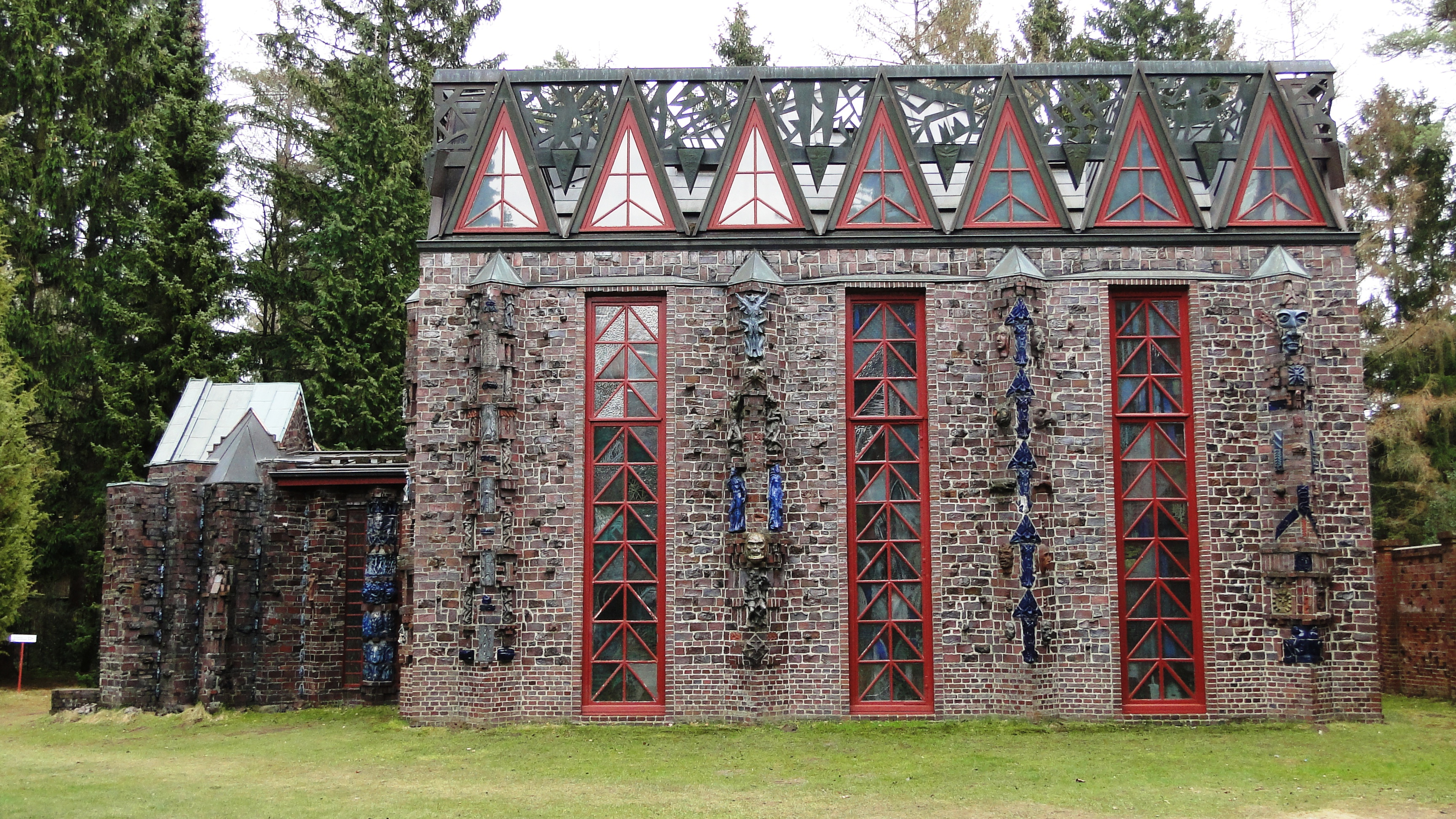
Kunsttempel (temple of arts)

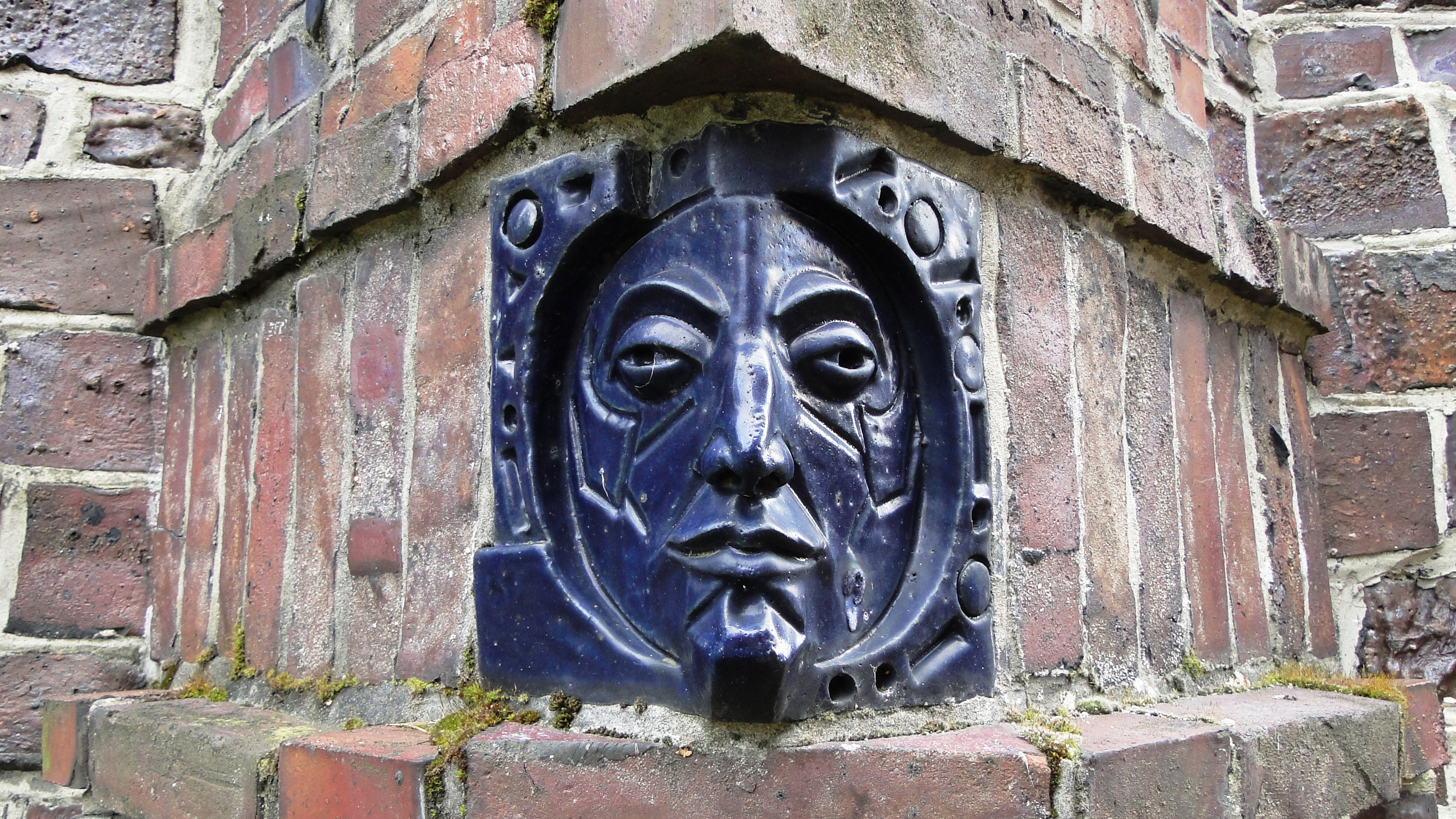
Detail from the exterior wall of the Kunsttempel

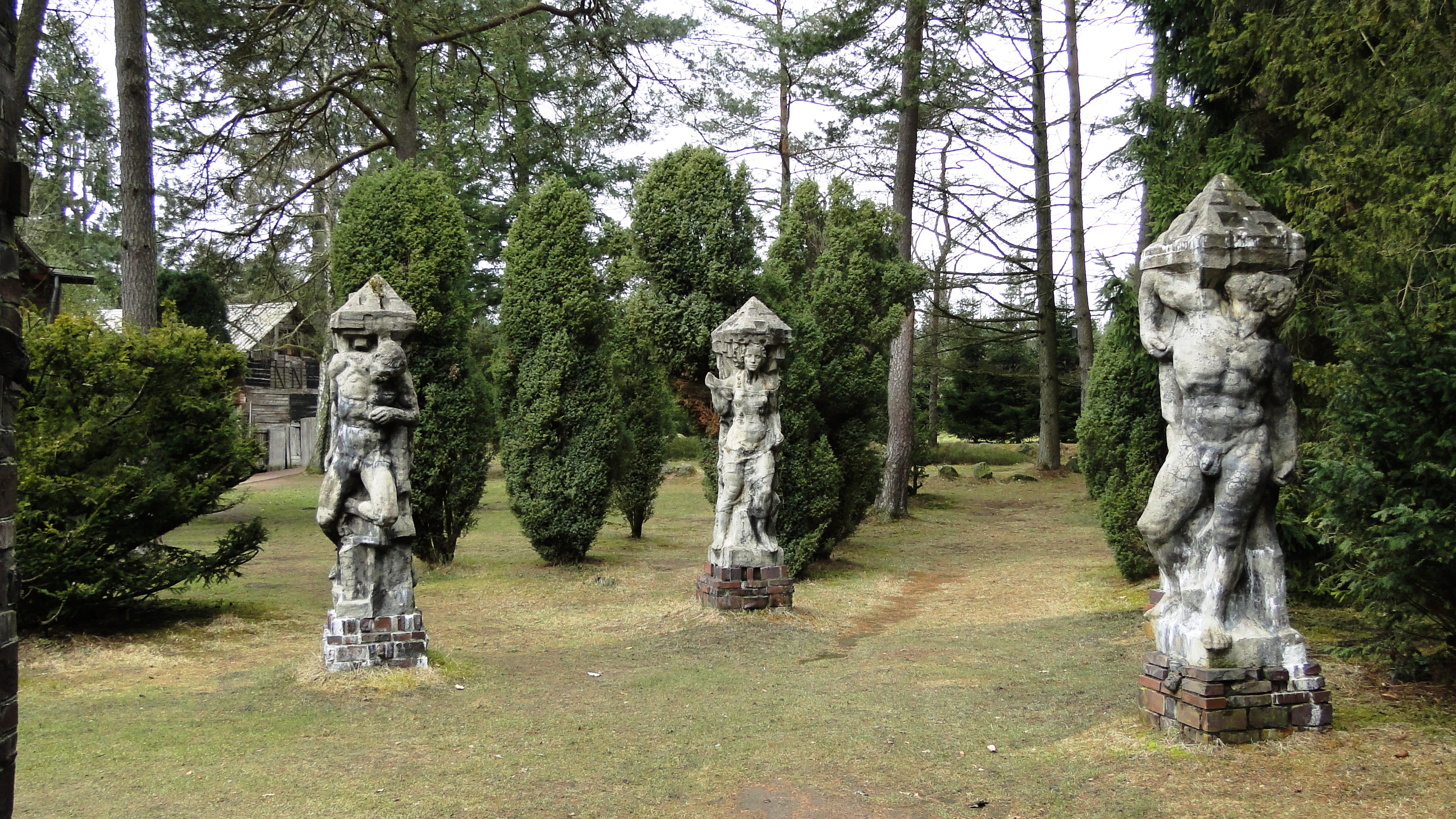
Sculptures in the garden

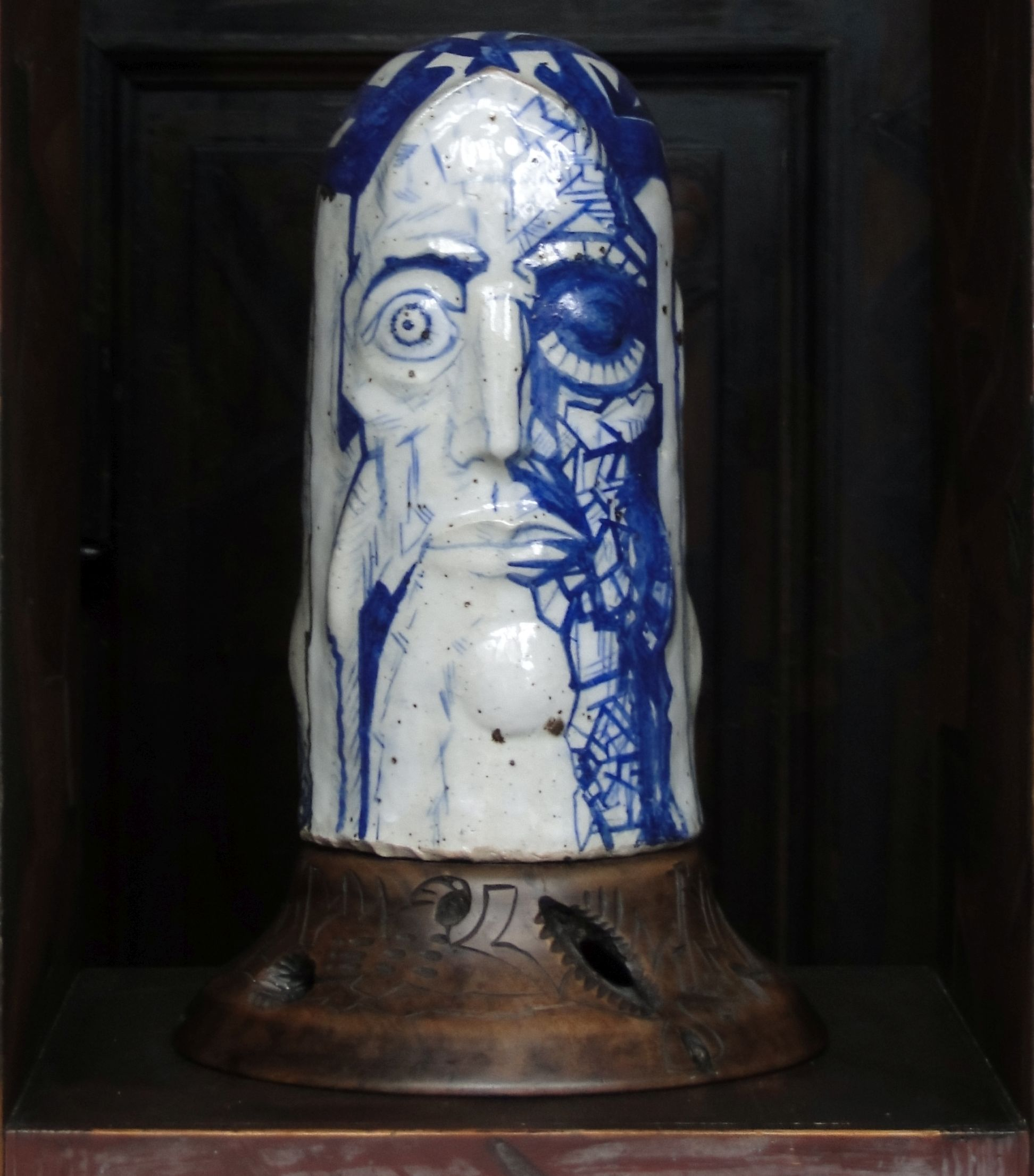
Self-portrait/sculpture of Odin in the Eddasaal of the Atelierhaus

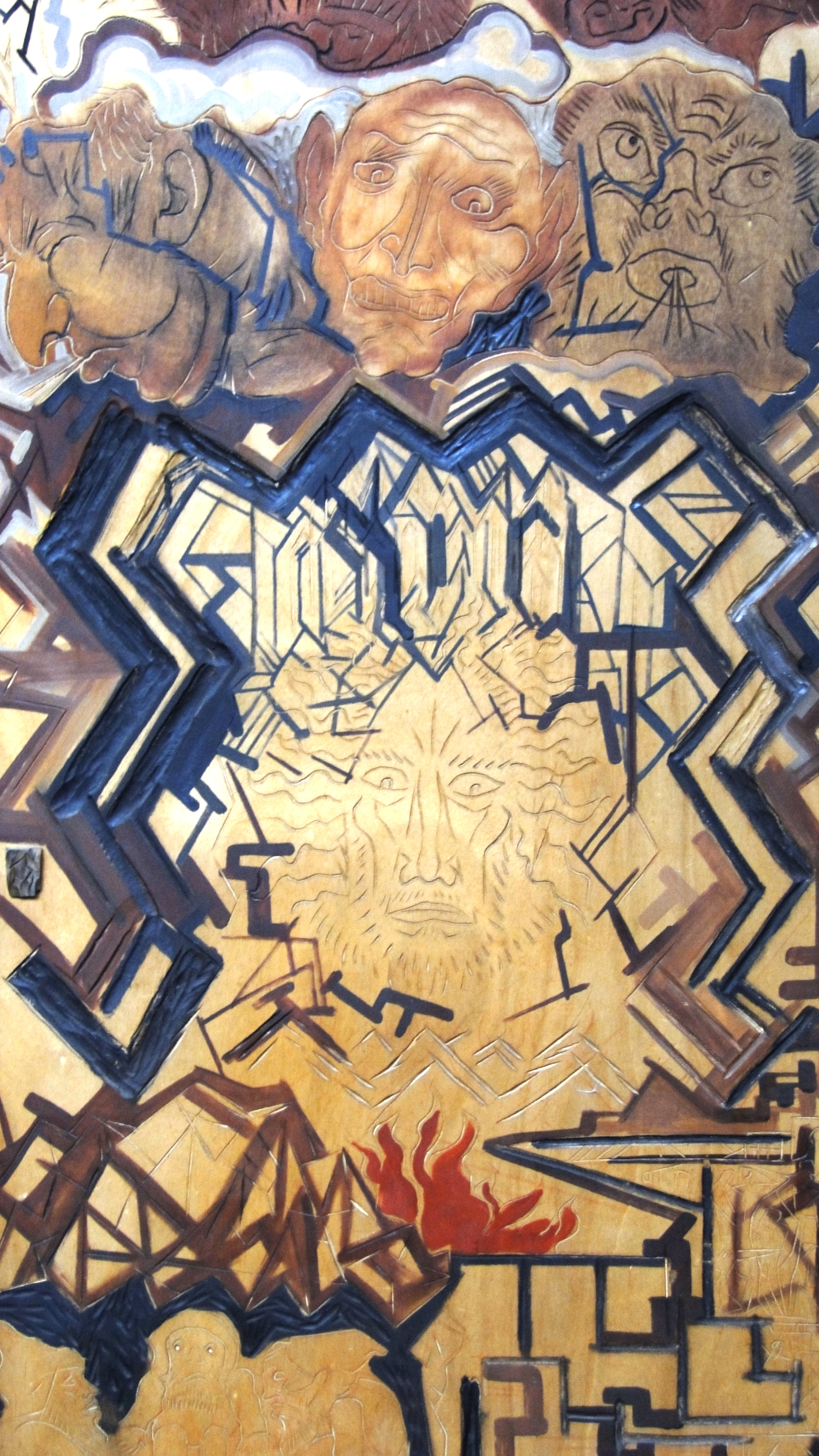
Wall painting in the Eddasaal of the Atelierhaus
