= Gert Fröbe =

German actor (1913–1988)

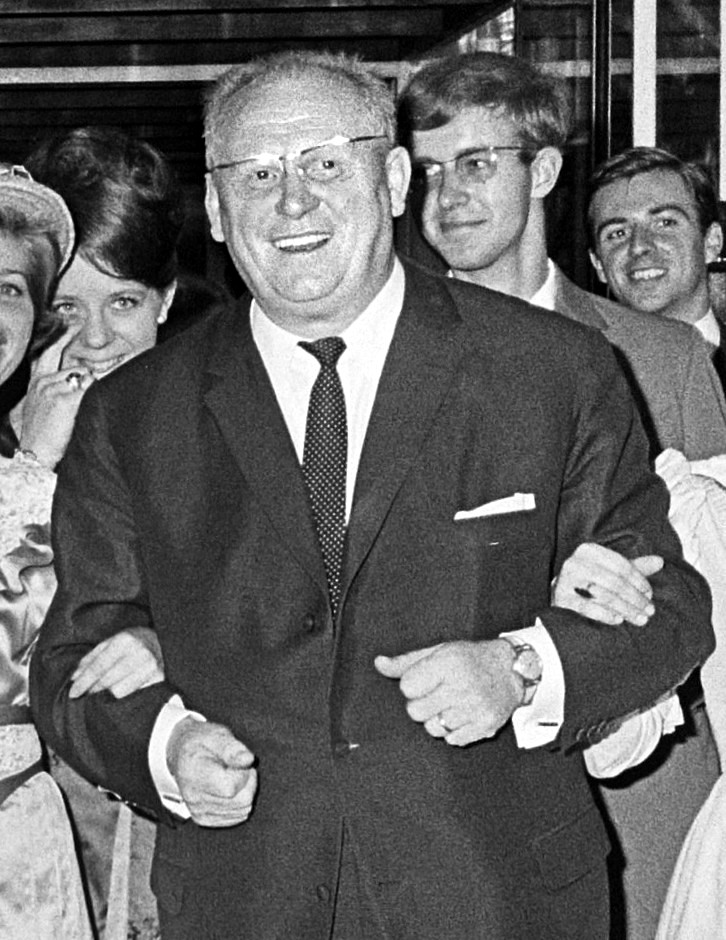
- Fröbe at the premiere of Those Magnificent Men in Their Flying Machines in 1965
- Born: Karl Gerhart Fröbe; 25 February 1913; Oberplanitz (near Zwickau), Kingdom of Saxony, German Empire
- Died: 5 September 1988 (aged 75); Munich, West Germany
- Occupation: Actor
- Years active: 1930s–1944; 1948–1987
- Spouse(s): Karin Kuderer-Pistorius (1970–?); Beate Bach (1962–1968); Hannelore Görtz (1953–1959); Tatjana Iwanow; Clara Peter
- Children: 2

Karl Gerhart "Gert" Fröbe (German: [ˈɡɛɐ̯t ˈfʁøːbə]; 25 February 1913 – 5 September 1988) was a German actor who appeared in over 100, mostly German-produced films. He was best known in English-speaking countries for his work as the title character in the James Bond film Goldfinger (1964). Other international films include his role as Baron Bomburst in Chitty Chitty Bang Bang (1968), as General Dietrich von Choltitz in Is Paris Burning? (1966), as Colonel Manfred von Holstein in Those Magnificent Men in Their Flying Machines (1965), and as Inspector Bauer in Ingmar Bergman's The Serpent's Egg (1977).

Fröbe was a three-time German Film Award nominee, twice for Best Leading Actor and once for Best Supporting Actor. In 1978, he won an honorary award for "outstanding individual contributions to the German cinema over the years."

== Early life and education ==
Karl Gerhart Fröbe was born on 25 February 1913 in Oberplanitz, today part of Zwickau. His father was a ropemaker. He was initially a violinist, but he abandoned it for Kabarett and theatre work.

He joined the Nazi Party in 1929 at the age of 16 and left in 1937, before the outbreak of the Second World War. After his party membership became known after the war, Israel banned Fröbe's films until Mario Blumenau, a Jewish Holocaust survivor, revealed just eight weeks later that his life and his mother's were probably saved when Fröbe hid them from the Nazis in his basement.

Fröbe became a stage decorator in the 1930s and made his acting debut in Wuppertal in 1937. In September 1944, theatres in Germany were closed down and Fröbe was drafted into the German Army, where he served until the end of the war.

== Career ==
Fröbe gained fame in one of the first German films made after the war, called Berliner Ballade (The Ballad of Berlin, 1948). His character's name, "Otto Normalverbraucher" (lit. Otto Average Consumer), became the German term equivalent to "Average Joe".

He was cast as the villain in the Swiss-West German-Spanish film Es geschah am hellichten Tag (It Happened in Broad Daylight, 1958), with the original screenplay written by Friedrich Dürrenmatt. His role as a serial killer of children drew the attention of the producers of the James Bond movie Goldfinger (1964) and he was chosen to play one of the best remembered villains of the series, gold tycoon Auric Goldfinger. He later remarked, "The ridiculous thing is that since I played Goldfinger in the James Bond film there are some people who still insist on seeing me as a cold, ruthless villain – a man without laughs."

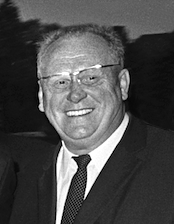
Fröbe in 1965

Fröbe made several appearances in all-star casts in the 1960s, including the films The Longest Day (1962), Those Magnificent Men in Their Flying Machines (1965), Is Paris Burning? (1966),Triple Cross (1966), Chitty Chitty Bang Bang (1968), and Monte Carlo or Bust (1969).

During the 1980s, Fröbe was a spokesman in Mercedes Benz W123 commercials, helping to promote the coupé and the sedan.

== Later life and death ==
Fröbe had surgery for cancer in 1986 but continued to make limited television appearances. He was due to head the jury at the 38th Berlin International Film Festival in February 1988 but pulled out due to illness. He died in Munich on 5 September 1988 at age 75 from a heart attack. He was buried at the Waldfriedhof cemetery in Icking.

== Filmography ==
Year	Title	Role	Language	Notes
1948	Der Herr vom andern Stern	Extra	German	Uncredited
1948	The Berliner	Otto Normalverbraucher	German	
1949	After the Rain Comes Sunshine	Konstantin	German	
1951	Decision Before Dawn	German Corporal	English	Uncredited
1952	The Day Before the Wedding	Rundfunkreporter	German	
1953	Man on a Tightrope	Police Agent	English	Uncredited
1953	Salto Mortale	Jan	German	
1953	A Heart Plays False	Briefüberbringer	German	
1953	The Postponed Wedding Night	Gondoliere	German	
1953	Arlette Conquers Paris	Manager Edmond Duval	German	
1953	Wedding in Transit	Herr Mengwasser	German	
1954	The Little Town Will Go to Sleep	Oskar Blume	German	
1954	Daybreak	Bit part	German	
1954	The Hunter's Cross	Kobbe	German	
1954	They Were So Young	Lobos	English	
1954	A Double Life	Mittelmeier	German	
1954	The Eternal Waltz	Gawriloff	German	
1955	Special Delivery	Olaf	English	
1955	The Dark Star	Deltorri	German	
1955	I Know What I'm Living For	Pfeifer, Inspektor Jugendfürsorge	German	
1955	Mr. Arkadin	Munich Detective	English	
1955	The Heroes Are Tired	Hermann	French	
1955	The Forest House in Tyrol	Bäuerle, Kaufmann	German	
1956	The Girl from Flanders	Rittmeister Kupfer	German	
1956	Ein Herz schlägt für Erika	Heubacher	German	
1956	Winter in the Woods	Gerstenberg	German	
1957	Typhoon Over Nagasaki	Ritter	French	
1957	The Girl and the Legend	Mr. Gillis	German	
1957	He Who Must Die	Patriarcheos	French	
1957	The Mad Bomberg	Kommerzienrat Gustav-Eberhard Mühlberg	German	
1957	Charming Boys	Edmond Petersen	French	
1957	The Heart of St. Pauli	Jabowski	German	
1958	Not Delivered	Hans	French	
1958	Nasser Asphalt	Jupp	German	
1958	It Happened in Broad Daylight	Schrott	German	
1958	Rosemary	Willy Bruster	German	
1958	Grabenplatz 17	Titu Goritsch	German	
1958	The Crammer	Freddy Blei	German	
1958	The Girl with the Cat's Eyes	Tessmann	German	
1959	Nick Knatterton's Adventure	Hugo	German	
1959	Prisoner of the Volga	Professor	English	
1959	Twelve Hours By the Clock	Blanche	French	
1959	Jons und Erdme	Smailus	German	
1959	The Forests Sing Forever	Dag	German	
1959	Menschen im Hotel	Preysing	German	
1959	The Day the Rains Came	Doctor Albert Maurer	German	
1959	Der Schatz vom Toplitzsee	Johannes Grohmann	German	
1959	Old Heidelberg	Doctor Jüttner	German	
1960	The High Life	Doctor Kölling	German	
1960	Between Love and Duty	The General	French	
1960	Headquarters State Secret	Der Chef	German	
1960	The Thousand Eyes of Dr. Mabuse	Inspector Kras	German	
1960	Until Money Departs You	Jupp Grapsch	German	
1960	Crook and the Cross	Paul Wittkowski	German	
1961	The Green Archer	Abel Bellamy	German	
1961	Via Mala	Jonas Lauretz	German	
1961	The Return of Doctor Mabuse (Note: Also known as The Phantom Fiend.)	Kommissar Lohmann	German	USA screening in 1966
1961	Auf Wiedersehen	Angelo Pirrone	German	
1962	Redhead	Kramer	German	
1962	The Testament of Dr. Mabuse	Kommissar Lohmann	German	
1962	The Longest Day	Sgt. Kaffeekanne	English	
1963	Enough Rope	Melchior Kimmel	French	
1963	Heute kündigt mir mein Mann	Alfred Paulsen	German	
1963	The Threepenny Opera	Peachum	German	
1963	Banana Peel	Raymond Lachard	French	
1964	Greed in the Sun	Castigliano	French	
1964	Tonio Kröger	Policeman Peterson	German	
1964	Backfire	Karl Fehrman	French	
1964	Goldfinger	Auric Goldfinger	English	Dubbed into English by Michael Collins.
1965	A High Wind in Jamaica	Dutch Captain	English	
1965	Those Magnificent Men in Their Flying Machines	Colonel Manfred von Holstein	English	
1965	Who Wants to Sleep?	Emil Claasen	German	
1966	The Upper Hand	Walter	French	
1966	Honour Among Thieves	Importen-Paul	German	
1966	Is Paris Burning?	General Dietrich von Choltitz	English	
1966	Triple Cross	Colonel Steinhager	English	
1967	I Killed Rasputin	Grigori Rasputin	English	
1967	Jules Verne's Rocket to the Moon	Professor von Bulow	English	
1968	Darling Caroline	Doctor Belhomme	French	
1968	Chitty Chitty Bang Bang	Baron Bomburst	English	
1969	Monte Carlo or Bust (Note: Also known as Those Daring Young Men in Their Jaunty Jalopies.)	Willi Schickel / Horst Muller	English	
1971	$	Mr. Kessel	English	
1972	Ludwig	Father Hoffmann	English	
1974	The Robber Hotzenplotz	Hotzenplotz	German	
1974	And Then There Were None	Wilhelm Blore	English	Dubbed into English by Robert Rietti.
1974	Nuits Rouges	Commissaire Sorbier	French	
1975	Docteur Justice	Max Orwall	French	
1976	Death Rite	Vestar	French	
1977	Das Gesetz des Clans	Philip Brown	German	
1977	The Serpent's Egg	Inspector Bauer	English	
1977	Death or Freedom	Graf von Buttlar	German	
1978	The Rider on the White Horse	Tede Volkerts	German	
1978	Der Tiefstapler	Felix von Korn	German	
1979	Bloodline	Inspector Max Hornung	English	
1980	The Umbrella Coup	Otto Krampe ("Whale")	French	
1981	The Falcon	Jug Bogdan	Serbo-Croatian	
1983	The Abduction of the Sabine Women	Emanuel Striese	German	TV film
1986–1987	The Little Vampire	Detective Gurrmeyer	German	TV series, 13 episodes

== Notes ==
James Bond
Preceded by Joseph Wiseman; Dr. No	Titular Character Actor; 1964	Succeeded by Christopher Lee; TMWTGG
Preceded by Lotte Lenya	Villain Actor; 1964	Succeeded by Adolfo Celi
