= Ballerina (1956 film) =

1956 film

- Directed by: G. W. Pabst
- Written by: Friedrich Dammann; Werner P. Zibaso
- Produced by: Günther Stapenhorst; Klaus Stapenhorst
- Starring: Willy Birgel; Elisabeth Müller; Ivan Desny
- Cinematography: Franz Koch
- Edited by: Lilian Seng
- Music by: Herbert Windt
- Production company: Carlton-Film
- Distributed by: Neue Filmverleih
- Release date: 29 March 1956
- Running time: 95 minutes
- Country: West Germany
- Language: German

Ballerina or Roses for Bettina (German: Rosen für Bettina) is a 1956 West German drama film directed by G. W. Pabst and starring Willy Birgel, Elisabeth Müller and Ivan Desny. It was shot at the Bavaria Studios in Munich. The film's sets were designed by the art directors Hertha Hareiter and Otto Pischinger.

== Cast ==
- Willy Birgel as Professor Förster
- Elisabeth Müller as Bettina Sanden
- Ivan Desny as Kostja Tomkoff, Choreograph
- Eva Kerbler as Irene Gerwig
- Leonard Steckel as Opernintendant
- Carl Wery as Dr. Brinkmann
- Hermann Speelmans as Kalborn
- Erich Ponto as Schimanski, Pförtner
- Art Blakey as Jazzmusiker

== Bibliography ==
- Rentschler, Eric. The Films of G.W. Pabst: An Extraterritorial Cinema. Rutgers University Press, 1990.
