= Beloved Corinna =

1956 film

- Film poster
- Directed by: Eduard von Borsody
- Written by: Robert Pilchowski (novel); Curt J. Braun; Ernst von Salomon
- Produced by: Fritz Anton; Heinz Fiebig; Hajo Wieland
- Starring: Elisabeth Müller
- Cinematography: Fritz Arno Wagner
- Edited by: Margot Jahn; Walter von Bonhorst
- Production company: Arca-Filmproduktion
- Distributed by: Neue Filmverleih
- Release date: 22 December 1956
- Running time: 100 minutes
- Country: West Germany
- Language: German

Beloved Corinna (German: Geliebte Corinna and also known as Corinna Darling) is a 1956 German drama film directed by Eduard von Borsody and starring Elisabeth Müller. It was shot at the Pichelsberg Studios in West Berlin. The art director Gabriel Pellon worked on the film's sets.

== Cast ==
- Elisabeth Müller as Corinna Stephan
- Hans Söhnker as Peter Mansfeld
- Hannelore Schroth as Dagmar Mansfeld
- Alexander Kerst as Dr. Suter
- Valéry Inkijinoff as Chin
- Klaus Kinski as Klaus Brockmann
- Annie Rosar as Frau Suter
- Wolfgang Gruner as Inspzient am Theater
- Panos Papadopulos as Longo
- Gerhard Bünte as Professor Hansen
- Silja Lesny
- Sigurd Lohde
- Ah Yue Lou as Suka (as Ah-Yue Lou)
- Nadira
