= The Power and the Prize =

1956 film

- Theatrical Film Poster
- Directed by: Henry Koster
- Written by: Robert Ardrey
- Based on: The Power and the Prize; 1954 novel by Howard Swiggett
- Produced by: Nicholas Nayfack
- Starring: Robert Taylor; Elisabeth Muller; Mary Astor; Cedric Hardwicke
- Cinematography: George J. Folsey
- Edited by: George Boemler
- Music by: Bronislau Kaper
- Production company: Metro-Goldwyn-Mayer
- Distributed by: Loew's Inc.
- Release date: September 26, 1956
- Running time: 98 minutes
- Country: United States
- Language: English
- Budget: $1,455,000
- Box office: $1,070,000

The Power and the Prize is a 1956 American drama film directed by Henry Koster and starring Robert Taylor, Elisabeth Muller, Burl Ives, Mary Astor and Cedric Hardwicke. It was produced by Metro-Goldwyn-Mayer. The screenplay was written by Robert Ardrey, adapted from the 1954 novel The Power and the Prize by Howard Swiggett. It was nominated for an Academy Award in 1957 for costume design.

== Plot ==
Although he is scheduled to wed his boss George Salt's niece that weekend, Amalgamated World Metals vice chairman Cliff Barton is sent to London to conduct a business deal that will enrich the firm. Salt considers him a protege and intends to turn over control of the company to Barton someday, insisting to him that business always comes first.

Cliff must hide the fact from Mr. Carew, who runs the British company, that Salt intends to unscrupulously assume control of the company rather than simply merge with it. While following through on Mrs. Salt's request to drop by her pet London-based charity, Cliff learns that it is operated by an Austrian refugee, and former Nazi concentration camp prisoner, named Miriam Linka.

Although his loyalties are with the company, Cliff wants no part of betraying Carew's trust. He also, against all odds, falls in love with Miriam and persuades her to return to America with him to be married. Salt angrily tries to spin the guilt so that it appears Cliff was the one defrauding the British, while accusations fly that Miriam is not only a prostitute but a Communist as well. Cliff is prepared to resign his position rather than give up Miriam, but board member Guy Elliot has investigated Miriam and clears the rumors about her with an Army Intelligence report. Elliot then presses Salt to retire, making Barton chairman as was always planned. Barton is made chairman and leaves on a honeymoon with Miriam.

== Cast ==
- Robert Taylor as Cliff Barton
- Elisabeth Muller as Miriam
- Burl Ives as George Salt
- Mary Astor as Mrs. Salt
- Cedric Hardwicke as Carew
- Charles Coburn as Guy Elliot
- Niki Dantine as Joan Salt
- Cameron Prud'Homme as Rev. John Barton
- Richard Erdman as Lester Everett
- Ben Wright as Mr. Chutwell
- Jack Raine as Mr. Pitt-Semphill
- Thomas Browne Henry as Paul F. Farragut
- Richard Deacon as Howard Carruthers
- Tol Avery as Dan Slocum
- John Banner as Mr. Ruloff
- John Zaremba as Fred Delehanty
- Violet Rensing as Berta
- Leslie Parrish as Telephone Operator

== Reception ==
According to MGM records the film earned only $570,000 in the US and Canada and $500,000 elsewhere resulting in a loss of $883,000.

== See also ==
- List of American films of 1956
