= The Poacher (1953 film) =

- Directed by: Alfred Lehner
- Written by: Josef Fischer (play); Karl Fischer; Franz Grohmann; Alfred Lehner; Hanns Marschall; Jürgen von Alten
- Starring: Renate Mannhardt; Kurt Heintel; Karl Fischer
- Cinematography: Károly Kurzmayer
- Music by: Bert Rudolf
- Production companies: Alba Film; Listo-Filmproduktion
- Distributed by: Adler-Film
- Release date: 16 October 1953
- Running time: 90 minutes
- Countries: Austria; West Germany
- Language: German

The Poacher (German: Der Wildschütz or Die große Schuld) is a 1953 Austrian-German drama film directed by Alfred Lehner and starring Renate Mannhardt, Kurt Heintel and Karl Fischer.

== Cast ==
- Renate Mannhardt as Kathrin Sedlmaier
- Kurt Heintel as Markus Groß
- Karl Fischer as Thoms Groß
- Wastl Witt as Bauer Groß
- C. von Balden as Franz Groß
- Marianne Schönauer as Magdalena
- Marianne Koch as Ursula
- Walter Janssen as Direktor Hellmer
- Cordula Grun as Hilde Hellmer
- Sepp Rist as Oberjäger Kurzinger
- Kurt Bülau as Jäger Martin
- Karl Tischlinger as Jäger Brechtler
- Alfred Menhardt as Stanglbauer
- Paula Braend as Stanglbäuerin
- Erika Pauli as Kellnerin, Marie
- Karl-Heinz Peters as Waldarbeiter Karl
- Rolf Wanka as Prosecutor
- Jürgen von Alten as Vorsitzender d. Gerichtes

== Bibliography ==
- Fritsche, Maria. Homemade Men in Postwar Austrian Cinema: Nationhood, Genre and Masculinity. Berghahn Books, 2013.
