= Honour Among Thieves (1966 film) =

1966 film directed by Wolfgang Staudte

- Directed by: Wolfgang Staudte
- Written by: Curth Flatow; Hans Wilhelm
- Based on: Honour Among Thieves by Charles Rudolph
- Produced by: Wenzel Lüdecke
- Starring: Gert Fröbe; Mario Adorf; Karin Baal
- Cinematography: Friedl Behn-Grund
- Edited by: Susanne Paschen
- Music by: Hans-Martin Majewski
- Production company: Inter West Film
- Distributed by: Atlas Film
- Release date: 14 April 1966
- Running time: 94 minutes
- Country: West Germany
- Language: German

Honour Among Thieves (German: Ganovenehre) is a 1966 West German comedy crime film directed by Wolfgang Staudte and starring Gert Fröbe, Mario Adorf and Karin Baal. Shot in Eastmancolor, it was filmed at the Spandau Studios in West Berlin. The film's sets were designed by the art directors Isabella Schlichting and Werner Schlichting. It was based on a play by Charles Rudolph, which had previously been made into a 1933 film of the same title by Richard Oswald.

== Synopsis ==
In Weimar era Berlin during the Roaring Twenties, safecracker Georg is released from prison and goes to work in a brothel run by Olga.

== Cast ==
- Gert Fröbe as Paul
- Mario Adorf as Georg aka Orje
- Curt Bois as Emil
- Karin Baal as Nelly
- Helen Vita as Olga
- Gretl Schörg as Red Erna
- Ilse Pagé as Edith
- Robert Rober as Max
- Gert Haucke as Arthur
- Jürgen Feindt as Backe-backe Kuchen
- Martin Hirthe as Karl

== Bibliography ==
- Campbell, Russell. Marked Women: Prostitutes and Prostitution in the Cinema. University of Wisconsin Press, 2006.
- Rother, Rainer (ed.) German Film: From the Archives of the Deutsche Kinemathek. Hatje Cantz Verlag, 2024.
