= Grischa Huber =

German actress (1944–2021)

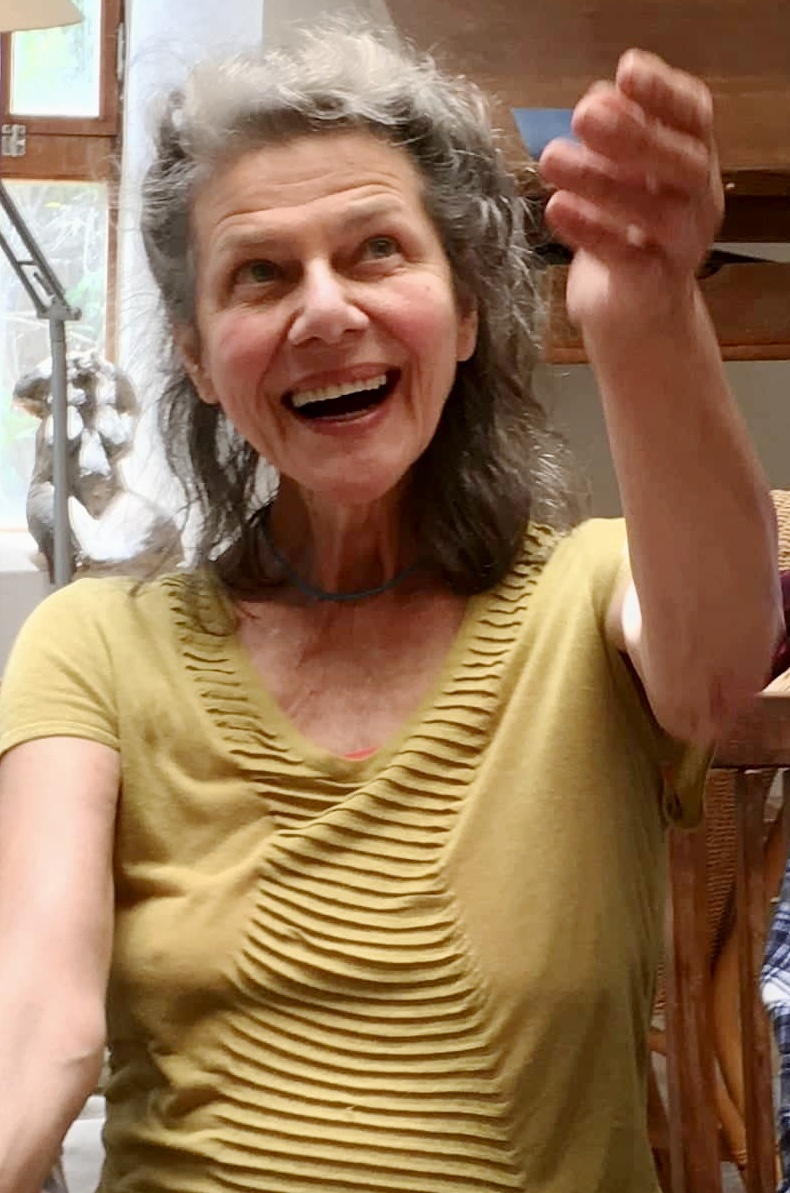
- Huber in 2017
- Born: Christel Magdalena Huber; 18 September 1944; Misdroy, Western Pomerania, Germany
- Died: 6 April 2021 (aged 76); Hamburg, Germany
- Occupation: Actress
- Awards: German Film Award

Christel Magdalena Huber, known as Grischa Huber (18 September 1944 – 6 April 2021) was a German theatre and film actress. She is known for the lead role in the film Under the Pavement Lies the Strand, a "cult film of the German feminist movement", which earned her the Filmband in Gold in 1975.

== Life and career ==
Huber was born in Misdroy on the Baltic Sea island Wollin (now part of Poland), the daughter of a seafarer. She was trained in ballet and acting at the Badisches Staatstheater Karlsruhe. After further acting studies in Munich with Ellen Mahlke, she made her stage debut at the Residenztheater in Jean Genet's Die Wände. She was a member of the ensemble of Schauspiel Köln from 1968, then played in Berlin from 1970, at the Nationaltheater Mannheim from 1973, at Schauspiel Bochum from 1979 and in Hamburg from 1986. She appeared in Hamburg in 1988 as Die Französin in Wedekind's Lulu, directed by Peter Zadek.

Her first film role came in 1970, in the literary film Lenz, produced by Literarisches Colloqium Berlin. It opened chances for roles in New German Cinema. In 1974, she played the lead role of Grischa in the film Unter dem Pflaster ist der Strand (Under the Pavement Lies the Strand), taking her character's name later for her artist name. The low-budget film was the first feature film by Helma Sanders-Brahms. Huber was involved in the script, and she portrayed a young actress during the 1960s student movement who was disillusioned but determined. She became a model for a generation of persistent young women, and was awarded the Filmband in Gold in 1975. She appeared in The Serpent's Egg (1977), directed by Ingmar Bergman. In Malou (1981), she appeared as Hannah Rethmann alongside Ingrid Caven in the title role. A reviewer found their faces, gestures and actions memorable. She acted in Young Goethe in Love (2010), directed by Philipp Stölzl, Hilde (2009), directed by Kai Wessel, and September (2003), directed by Max Färberböck. In television, she appeared in the SOKO Stuttgart series of the ZDF, in Knocked Up (2013) for SAT.1, and Hurenkinder (2008) for ARD. She portrayed the role of Frau Fischern in The Garden (2017), written and directed by Sonja Maria Kröner.

Huber was first married to the actor Michael König; the couple had a daughter, Muriel König. She married artist Götz Loepelmann in 1999. They later lived separately, but she remained his muse and model until his death in 2017.

Huber died in Hamburg on 6 April 2021 after a long illness, aged 76.

== Selected filmography ==
- Under the Pavement Lies the Strand (1975), as Grischa
- Die Tannerhütte (1976, TV film), as Elisabeth
- Heinrich (1977), as Ulrike von Kleist
- The Serpent's Egg (1977), as Stella
- Malou (1981), as Hannah
- The Logic of Emotion (1982), as Beatrice
- Die Liebesforscherin (1985, TV film), as Marie
- The Colony (1987), as Eliana
- The State Chancellery (1989, TV film), as Irmlind Heiser
