= John van Dreelen =

Dutch actor (1922–1992)

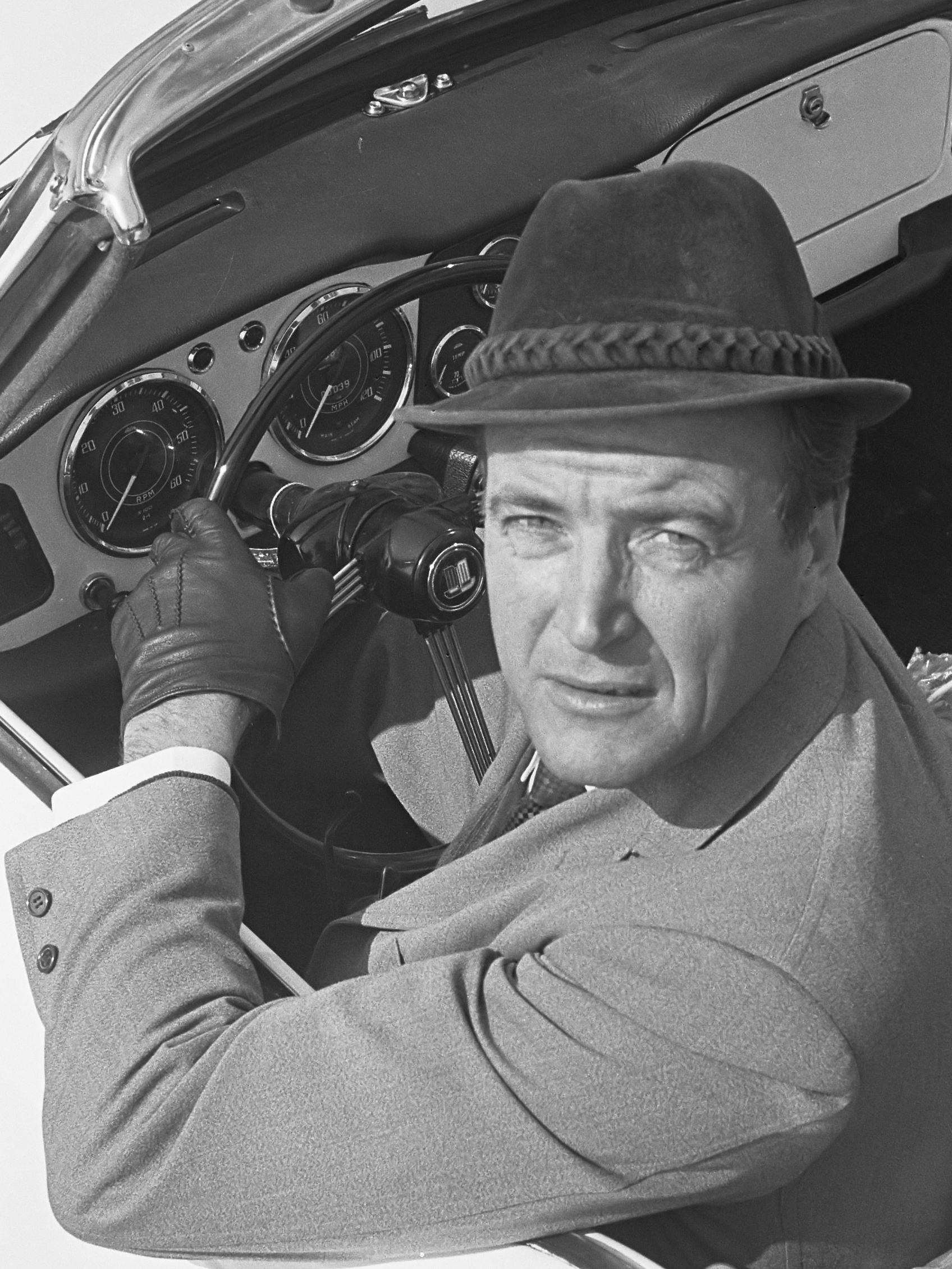
- van Dreelen in 1964
- Born: Jacques Theodore van Drielen Gimberg; May 5, 1922; Amsterdam, Netherlands
- Died: September 4, 1992 (aged 70); Cap d'Agde, Hérault, France
- Years active: 1948–1992

John van Dreelen (born Jacques Theodore van Drielen Gimberg; 5 May 1922 – 4 September 1992) was a Dutch actor, who frequently performed on television from the 1960s to the 1980s.

== Early years ==
Van Dreelen was born in Amsterdam, the son of Dutch actor Louis van Dreelen Gimberg and the Countess de Labouchere of Paris. He attended the Sorbonne and was fluent in several languages.

During World War II, his stage career was interrupted by the German invasion of the Netherlands. He escaped the Emslandlager labor camp near Papenburg by disguising himself as one of the German officers, a role he would later play so often on both big and small screens.

Until 1950, his stage name was Jack Gimberg, at which time he changed it to John van Dreelen.

== Television ==
Though he appeared in many European films, van Dreelen is best remembered as an A-list guest star in dozens of American television shows from the early 1960s to the mid-1980s, such as 12 O'Clock High, The Twilight Zone ("The Jeopardy Room"), The Man from U.N.C.L.E., Voyage to the Bottom of the Sea, The Wild Wild West, Combat!, Blue Light, Mission: Impossible and Wonder Woman. In 1962, he played the part of Ulrich in the episode "The Immigrants" on CBS's Rawhide. In 1964, he played a film producer in the Perry Mason episode, "The Case of the Bountiful Beauty." In 1965, he appeared on Perry Mason again as Jarvis Logan in the episode, "The Case of the Feather Cloak."

== Film ==
Never a major player in theatrical films, he nonetheless scored a few choice roles, including the Danish concert pianist who rescues and woos Lana Turner during an extended sequence in Madame X in 1966. Four episodes of Blue Light were edited together to create the theatrical film I Deal in Danger, which was released in December 1966 and included his appearance. His other film credits included roles in Von Ryan's Express (1965), Topaz (1969), Lost Horizon (1973), The Big Game (1973), The Clone Master (1978), The Formula (1980), The Money Pit (1986) and Born to Fight (1989), as well as TV miniseries such as The Rhinemann Exchange, The Word and Washington: Behind Closed Doors.

== Stage ==
Van Dreelen had an international stage career and starred in a Dutch staging of My Fair Lady. He starred as Baron Von Trapp for 40 weeks in the original American touring production of The Sound of Music. (According to the actor, Richard Rodgers wanted van Dreelen and Audrey Hepburn to play the film's leads.)

== Filmography ==
- Niet tevergeefs (1948)
- But Not in Vain (1948) – Minor Role (uncredited)
- Gigi (1949) – Bit Part (uncredited)
- Full House (1952) – Lemmy Caution (segment "Je suis un tendre")
- Moulin Rouge (1952) – Bit part (uncredited)
- Red Roses, Red Lips, Red Wine (1953) – Hans Westhoff
- Heartbroken on the Moselle (1953) – Bernd Zagler
- Monte Carlo Baby (1953) – Rudy Walter
- Daybreak (1954)
- Ein Mädchen aus Paris (1954)
- The Last Ten Days (1955) – Major Brinkmann
- Bedevilled (1955) – Michel Trevelle (uncredited)
- In Hamburg When the Nights Are Long (1956) – Peter Drante
- Zwei Herzen voller Seligkeit (1957) – Dieter Lorenz
- A Time to Love and a Time to Die (1958) – Political Officer
- The Flying Fontaines (1959) – Victor Fontaine
- The Leech Woman (1960) – Bertram Garvay
- The Enemy General (1960) – Gen. Bruger
- Beyond the Time Barrier (1960) – Dr. Bourman
- 13 Ghosts (1960) – Van Allen
- The Wizard of Baghdad (1960) – Sultan Jullnar
- Von Ryan's Express (1965) – Col. Gortz
- Madame X (1966) – Christian Torben
- I Deal in Danger (1966) – von Lindendorf
- Von null Uhr eins bis Mitternacht (1967, TV Series) – Mark Lissen
- The Duck Rings at Half Past Seven (1968) – Lawyer Kellermann
- Topaz (1969) – Claude Martin
- My Dog, the Thief (1969) – George Travell
- Nightshade (1972) – Jan Eckmann
- Lost Horizon (1973) – Dr. Verden
- The Big Game (1973) – Lee
- Rufus (1975) – Marcel
- Too Hot to Handle (1977) – MacKenzie Portman
- The Clone Master (1978) – Salt
- The Formula (1980) – Hans Lehman, Prefect of Police Berlin
- Hart to Hart (1983) – Henri Beaumont
- The Money Pit (1986) – Carlos
- Mascara (1987) – Minister Weinberger
- Odyssée d'amour (1987) – Dr. Alexander De Winter
- Zoeken naar Eileen (1987) – Philips vader
- Born to Fight (1989) – Gen. Weber
- Gummibärchen küßt man nicht (1989) – Geyer
- Operation Las Vegas (1990) – Parker
- Becoming Colette (1991) – Albert
