= The Crazy Clinic =

1954 film

- Directed by: Alwin Elling
- Written by: Alwin Elling; Erwin Kreker
- Starring: Ingrid Andree; Maria Andergast; Claus Biederstaedt
- Cinematography: Paul Grupp
- Music by: Friedrich Schröder
- Production company: Astra-Film
- Release date: 2 March 1954
- Running time: 95 minutes
- Country: West Germany
- Language: German

The Crazy Clinic (German: Sanatorium total verrückt) is a 1954 West German comedy film directed by Alwin Elling, starring Ingrid Andree, Maria Andergast and Claus Biederstaedt. It was shot at the Göttingen Studios with sets designed by the art directors Heinrich Richter and Bruno Lutz .

== Cast ==
- Ingrid Andree as Inge
- Maria Andergast as Gutsbesitzerin
- Claus Biederstaedt as Evelyns Begleiter
- Joachim Brennecke as Inges Begleiter
- Charlott Daudert as Lissy
- Erich Fiedler as Henry
- Albert Florath
- Ursula Grabley
- Al Hoosmann
- Martl Koch
- Harald Paulsen as Professor
- Mady Rahl as Wera
- Lotte Rausch
- Willi Sahler
- Franz Schafheitlin
- Jeanette Schultze as Evelyn
- Josef Sieber
- Hans Zesch-Ballot

== Bibliography ==
- Parish, James Robert. Film Actors Guide. Scarecrow Press, 1977.
