= Elisabeth Müller =

Swiss actress (1926–2006)

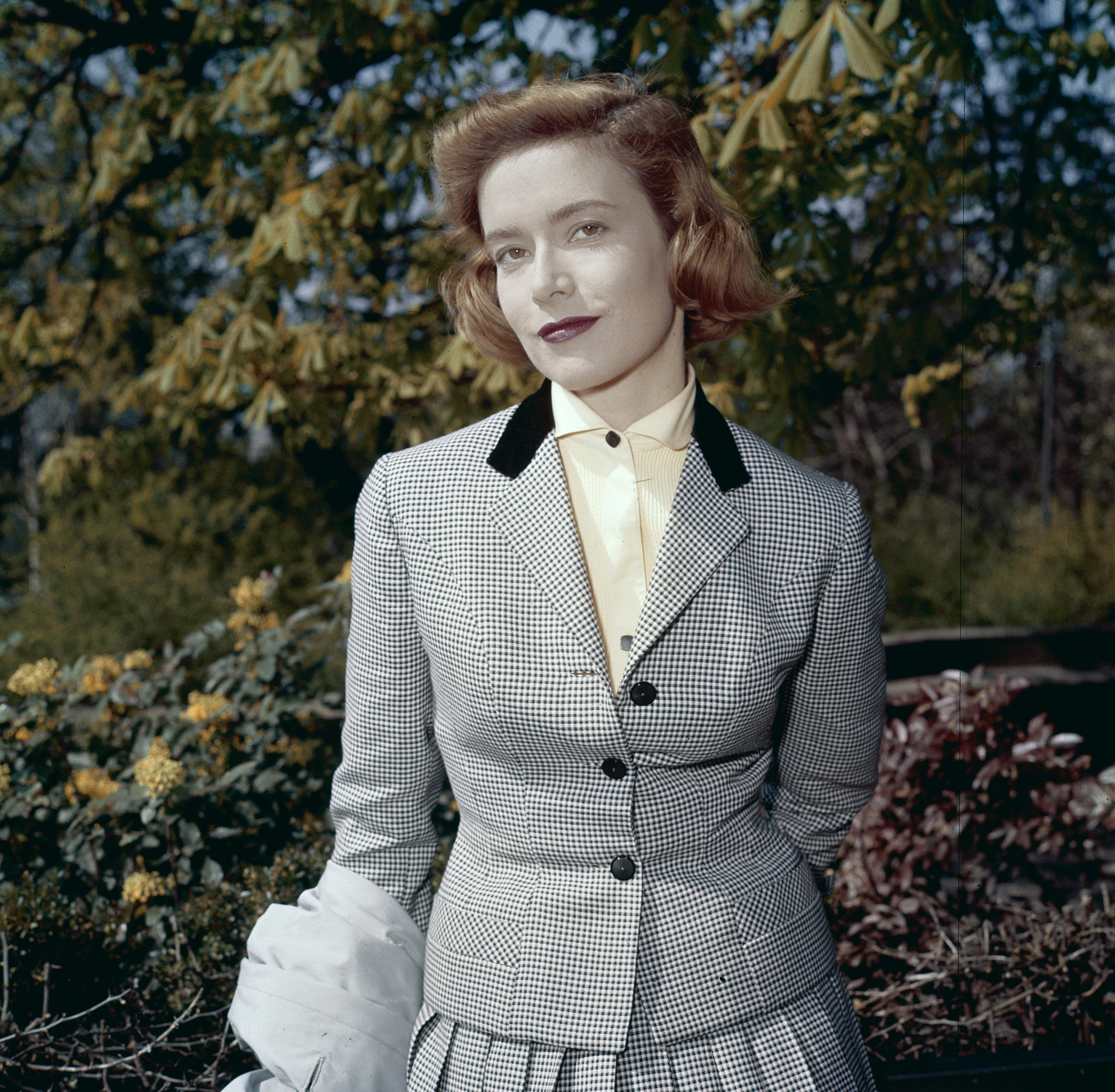
Elisabeth Müller (1957)

Elisabeth Müller (18 July 1926 – 11 December 2006) was a Swiss actress.

== Filmography ==
Year	Title	Role	Notes
1947	Madness Rules	Sister Irma Wasem	
1952	The Day Before the Wedding	Thea	
1953	Heartbroken on the Moselle	Angela Schaefer	
1954	Daybreak	Inge Jensen	
1954	The Confession of Ina Kahr	Ina Kahr	
1955	André und Ursula	Ursula Hartmann	
1956	Ballerina	Bettina Sanden	
1956	The Power and the Prize	Miriam Linka	
1956	Beloved Corinna	Corinna Stephan	
1957	Taxichauffeur Bänz	Irma Bänz	
1957	Scandal in Bad Ischl	Viola Duhr	
1957	El Hakim	Lady Avon	
1958	Doctor Crippen Lives	Fleur Blanchard	
1958	Confess, Doctor Corda	Beate Corda	
1959	Rommel Calls Cairo	Lt. Kay Morrison	
1959	The Angry Hills	Lisa Kyriakides	
1959	Every Day Isn't Sunday	Eva Kende	
1960	Am grünen Strand der Spree	Barbara Bibiena	TV miniseries
1984	Derrick	Dr. Ursula von Haidersfeld	Episode: "Das Mädchen in Jeans"
1984	The Old Fox	Ilse von Seydl	Episode: "Die Tote im Schloßpark"
