= Rolf Wanka =

Austrian actor

- Born: 14 February 1901; Vienna, Austria-Hungary
- Died: 28 November 1982 (aged 81); Munich, West Germany
- Occupation: Actor
- Years active: 1931–1976

Rolf Wanka (14 February 1901 – 30 November 1982) was an Austrian actor.

== Biography ==
He was of Czech, German and French origin. His father was Dr. Josef Wanka was head physician in Vienna. His mother was Emma Pippich. His family owned a mansion in Hřiměždice, Czechoslovakia, where he spent a lot of time. He studied Czech Technical University in Prague, then University of Innsbruck. He spoke German, Czech, French and English. He appeared as a leading man in many Austrian, West German and Czechoslovak movies. He was married three times and had two children. His second wife was the actress Friedl Czepa.

== Selected filmography ==
- M (1931) - Man (uncredited)
- Wehe, wenn er losgelassen (1932) - Der heilige Petrus
- The Foolish Virgin (1935) - Anton Rabeling
- The World's in Love (1935) - Peter, sein Sohn
- Circus Saran (1935) - Kurt von Herdegen
- Father Vojtěch (1936) - Father Vojtěch Dvorecký
- Irca's Romance (1936) - Lexa Hora
- Not a Word About Love (1937, German-language version of Poslíček lásky) - Hubert Kersten - Modeschöpfer
- Escape to the Adriatic (1937, German-language version of Irca's Romance) - Fred Bergen - Monteur
- Poslíček lásky (1937) - Pavel Toman
- Lízin let do nebe (1937) - Dr. Petr Tumlir
- Krok do tmy (1938) - Ronny
- Alert in the Mediterranean (1938) - von Schlieden
- Linen from Ireland (1939) - Dr. Goll
- The Right to Love (1939) - Martin Förchinger, sein Förster u. Verwalter
- My Daughter Doesn't Do That (1940) - Georg Bartenberg
- Anuschka (1942) - Dr. Sascha Wendt
- Dog Days (1944) - Dr. Peter Kirchner
- The Magic Face (1951) - Gen. Rodenbusch
- Maria Theresa (1951) - Oberstkämmerer Khevenhüller
- The Poacher (1953) - Prosecutor
- Stars Over Colombo (1953) - Prosecutor
- Franz Schubert (1953) - Franz Schober
- Street Serenade (1953)
- The Prisoner of the Maharaja (1954) - Prosecutor
- The Red Prince (1954) - Rittmeister Graf Daun
- The Silent Angel (1954) - Kats
- Marriage Impostor (1954) - Baron Goutten
- Ball of Nations (1954) - Brambachen
- Three Birch Trees on the Heath (1956) - Ernö, Zigeunerprimas
- The Battalion in the Shadows (1957) - Narrador
- The Priest and the Girl (1958) - Fiori
- For Love and Others (1959) - Senor Ravella
- The Merry War of Captain Pedro (1959) - Leopold I, Deutscher Kaiser
- Three Men in a Boat (1961) - Dr. Flüeli
- Captain Sindbad (1963) - The King
- Sin with a Discount (1968) - Kurt
- The Internecine Project (1974) - Art Dealer
- The Desert of the Tartars (1976) - Prosdocimo
