= Poslíček lásky =

- Directed by: Miroslav Cikán
- Written by: Miroslav Cikán, Jaroslav Mottl, Hans Regina von Nack
- Starring: Rolf Wanka, Hana Vítová, Jindřich Plachta.
- Cinematography: Ferdinand Pečenka
- Music by: Jára Beneš
- Production company: Lord-Film
- Release date: 1937
- Country: Czechoslovakia

Poslíček lásky is a 1937 Czechoslovak romance film, directed by Miroslav Cikán. It stars Rolf Wanka, Hana Vítová, Jindřich Plachta.

== Cast ==
- Rolf Wanka as Pavel Toman
- Hana Vítová as Jirina
- Jindřich Plachta as Její otec
- Václav Trégl as Úcetní Fábera
- Bedřich Veverka as Brok
- Bohuš Záhorský as Curry
- Vlasta Hrubá as Jeho Spolecnice
- Fanda Mrázek as Holic
- Milada Smolíková as Uklízecka
- Slávka Doležalová as Slecna Ema

== See also ==
- Not a Word About Love (1937)
