= The Great Temptation =

1952 film

- Directed by: Rolf Hansen
- Written by: Kurt Heuser
- Based on: Der Erfolgreiche by Hans Kades
- Produced by: Carl Wilhelm Tetting
- Starring: Dieter Borsche; Ruth Leuwerik; Renate Mannhardt
- Cinematography: Friedl Behn-Grund; Franz Weihmayr
- Edited by: Anna Höllering
- Music by: Mark Lothar
- Production companies: Deutsche London-Film; Rotary-Film
- Distributed by: Deutsche Film Hansa
- Release date: 18 December 1952
- Running time: 97 minutes
- Country: West Germany
- Language: German

The Great Temptation (German: Die große Versuchung) is a 1952 West German drama film directed by Rolf Hansen and starring Dieter Borsche, Ruth Leuwerik and Renate Mannhardt. It was made at the Bavaria Studios in Munich. The film's sets were designed by the art directors Franz Bi and Botho Hoefer.

== Synopsis ==
A successful surgeon conceals from his colleagues that he has never formally received any medical qualifications, having learned his skills working as a medical orderly in a Soviet prisoner of war camp.

== Cast ==
- Dieter Borsche as Richard Gerbrand
- Ruth Leuwerik as Hilde
- Renate Mannhardt as Sylva
- Carl Wery as Medizinalrat Dr. Bosch
- Paul Bildt as Dr. Riebold
- Claus Biederstaedt as Famulus Huber
- Ulrich Bettac as Judge
- Friedrich Domin as Defense lawyer Dr. Frank
- Heinrich Gretler as Bürgermeister Max Händel
- Heini Göbel as Dr. Schnetz
- Harald Holberg as Alexander Rochwald
- Bruno Hübner as Professor Dr. Nanken
- Erich Ponto as Professor Dr. Gandolphi
- Rudolf Reiff as Generaldirektor Witt
- Ado Riegler as Dr. Köberl
- Franz Schafheitlin as Landrat Rochwald
- Ernst Schröder as Prosecutor
- Paula Braend as Oberschwester Therese
- Lina Carstens
- Marion Morell as Schwester Narzisse
- Charlotte Scheier-Herold as Frau Rochwald
- Edith Schultze-Westrum as Frau Riebold

== Bibliography ==
- Hake, Sabine. German National Cinema. Routledge, 2013.
