= Fritz von Friedl (cinematographer) =

Austrian cinematographer

- Born: Friedrich Waldemar Wilhelm Friedl, Ritter von Liebentreu; 8 April 1901; Písek, Bohemia, Austro-Hungarian Empire (now Czech Republic)
- Died: 31 December 1971 (aged 70); Vienna, Austria
- Occupation: Cinematographer
- Years active: 1930–1963

Fritz von Friedl (1901–1971) was an Austrian cinematographer. He worked frequently on newsreels and documentary, including many during the Second World War for the Wehrmacht.

He was the father of the actor Fritz von Friedl and actress Loni von Friedl.

He was the grandfather of actor Christoph von Friedl.

== Selected filmography ==
- Ninety Minute Stopover (1936)
- The Impossible Mister Pitt (1938)
- Men, Animals and Sensations (1938)
- Vom Mädchen zur Frau (1950)
- The Last Reserves (1953)
- The Red Prince (1954)
- Goetz von Berlichingen (1955)

== Bibliography ==
- Fritsche, Maria. Homemade Men in Postwar Austrian Cinema: Nationhood, Genre and Masculinity. Berghahn Books, 2013.
