= The Serpent's Egg (film) =

1977 film by Ingmar Bergman

- Theatrical release poster
- Das Schlangenei
- Directed by: Ingmar Bergman
- Written by: Ingmar Bergman
- Produced by: Dino De Laurentiis
- Starring: Liv Ullmann; David Carradine; Gert Fröbe; Heinz Bennent; Glynn Turman; James Whitmore
- Cinematography: Sven Nykvist
- Music by: Rolf A. Wilhelm
- Distributed by: Paramount Pictures (United States); Tobis Film (West Germany)
- Release date: 28 October 1977
- Running time: 120 minutes
- Countries: United States; West Germany
- Languages: English; German

The Serpent's Egg is a 1977 drama-mystery film written and directed by Ingmar Bergman and starring David Carradine and Liv Ullmann. The story is set in 1920s Berlin and features English and German dialogue. It was Bergman's only Hollywood film. The title is taken from a line spoken by Brutus in Shakespeare's Julius Caesar: "And therefore think him as a serpent's egg / Which hatch'd, would as his kind grow mischievous; / And kill him in the shell". Even though the film was a critical and commercial failure upon its initial release, Bergman was reported to be happy with the film.

== Plot ==
In late 1923 Berlin, Abel Rosenberg, an unemployed alcoholic and former trapeze artist, struggles to cope with the hardships of post-war Germany. After discovering his brother Max's suicide, Abel is offered money by his old boss to come back to the circus. However, he declines the offer, feeling that he won't be as good without his brother. Abel meets Max's wife, Manuela, to break the news of his death. Unable to provide a clear reason for Max's suicide, Abel only recalls a sentence from Max's note mentioning "poisoning."

Seeking solace in alcohol, Abel goes on a drinking binge and spends the night at Manuela's house. They discuss Abel's future career prospects, but when Manuela leaves for work, Abel steals from her to buy more alcohol. Later, Abel is taken by the police to identify several bodies, all of which were found near his home. Suspicion falls on Abel, and he attempts to escape but is recaptured.

Manuela visits Abel in the hospital, revealing that all her money is gone. Abel is released due to lack of evidence and returns home with Manuela. However, they face eviction when it is discovered they are not married. Manuela confesses that she is a prostitute, having concocted an office job to hide her shame. As tensions rise in November with the threat of armed confrontations between extremist parties, Abel and Manuela live in fear on the outskirts of Berlin.

One morning, Abel secretly follows Manuela and discovers she has been going to church. She confides in a priest, expressing guilt over her husband's death and the fear consuming their lives. Abel later learns that Manuela secured their apartment by providing sexual favors to the owner of the brothel where she works. Initially disgusted, Abel eventually returns to Manuela and they share a passionate kiss. However, their time together is cut short when soldiers overrun the brothel, killing the owner.

Abel finds a job as a file clerk in a hospital, while Manuela works at the clinic. They live in an apartment surrounded by abandoned buildings. One night, Abel discovers files detailing inhumane experiments conducted on patients at the hospital. Overwhelmed by fear, Abel withdraws from intimacy, and Manuela experiences extreme mood swings. After a drunken incident and a sexual encounter with a prostitute, Abel returns home to find Manuela dead and cameras scattered in the apartment.

Fleeing the scene, Abel ends up in an abandoned industrial building and fights off an unknown attacker in an elevator, decapitating him. Returning to the hospital, Abel confronts the doctor about the experiments. The doctor claims the subjects were volunteers driven by desperation. Abel is shown footage of Max injecting himself with a serum that ultimately led to his suicide. The doctor justifies the experiments, stating they will benefit mankind. As the police arrive, the doctor commits suicide with cyanide.

Abel is placed in a psychiatric ward to recover. The chief of police informs him that the circus has offered his old job, and he is forced to accept. It is revealed that Abel escapes from police custody on the way to the train station and disappears. The voice-over suggests that Abel evades capture and is never seen again.

== Cast ==
- Liv Ullmann (Manuela Rosenberg)
- David Carradine (Abel Rosenberg)
- Gert Fröbe (Inspector Bauer)
- Heinz Bennent (Hans Vergérus)
- James Whitmore (Priest)
- Glynn Turman (Monroe)
- Georg Hartmann (Hollinger)
- Edith Heerdegen (Mrs Holle)
- Kyra Mladeck (Miss Dorst)
- Fritz Straßner (Doctor Soltermann)
- Hans Quest (Doctor Silbermann)
- Wolfgang Weiser (Official)
- Paula Braend (Mrs. Hemse)
- Walter Schmidinger (Solomon)
- Lisi Mangold (Mikaela)
- Grischa Huber (Stella)
- Paul Bürks
- Toni Berger (Mr. Rosenberg)
- Erna Brunell (Mrs. Rosenberg)
- Isolde Barth
- Rosemarie Heinikel
- Andrea L'Arronge
- Beverly McNeely
- Hans Eichler (Max)
- Kai Fischer
- Harry Kalenberg
- Gaby Dohm
- Christian Berkel (Student)
- Paul Burian
- Charles Regnier
- Günter Meisner
- Heide Picha
- Günter Malzacher
- Hubert Mittendorf
- Hertha von Walther
- Ellen Umlauf
- Renate Grosser
- Hildegard Busse
- Richard Bohne
- Emil Feist
- Heino Hallhuber
- Irene Steinbeisser

== Production ==
The film was released one year after Bergman had left Sweden for West Germany following a tax-evasion charge. The film was shot in Munich, where Bergman was residing.

Bergman’s first choice for the male lead was Dustin Hoffman; however, Hoffman declined the role, as did Robert Redford, Richard Harris, and Peter Falk. Ultimately, the role went to David Carradine. Elliott Gould claimed that Bergman had written the lead role for him, but that producer Dino De Laurentiis overruled it, with David Carradine cast in his place. The film was produced on a budget—considered substantial at the time—of 9.2 million Deutsche Marks. Production designer Rolf Zehetbauer constructed a complete replica of Berlin’s historic Bergmannstraße on the studio grounds at Geiselgasteig for The Serpent’s Egg. Bergman’s decision to have a horse killed for a scene—in which starving Berliners hack a horse carcass to pieces—sparked considerable controversy.

Through the film, Bergman sought to come to terms with the admiration he had harbored for fascism during his youth.

The film opened in cinemas in West Germany on October 26, 1977, and in Bergman’s native Sweden on October 28, 1977. The film premiered in the United States on January 26, 1978, and in cinemas in East Germany on May 16, 1980.

== Reception ==
The Serpent's Egg opened to mostly negative reviews from critics. In the Chicago Reader, Dave Kehr opined that Bergman "comes very close to camp" and argued that the suffering throughout the work "... has no shape or substance, apart from pointing out that Nazis and their progenitors were not nice people." Roger Ebert wrote that "... there is no form, no pattern, and when Bergman tries to impose one by artsy pseudo-newsreel footage and a solemn narration, he reminds us only of the times he has used both better." The film continues to receive mostly negative reviews and holds a rating of 20% on Rotten Tomatoes from 20 reviews.
