= A Woman of Today =

1954 film

- Directed by: Paul Verhoeven
- Written by: Juliane Kay; Paul Verhoeven
- Produced by: Erwin Gitt; Willy Zeyn
- Starring: Luise Ullrich; Curd Jürgens; Carsta Löck
- Cinematography: Franz Weimayr
- Edited by: Klaus Dudenhöfer
- Music by: Fritz Wenneis
- Production company: Fama-Film
- Distributed by: Europa-Filmverleih
- Release date: 14 April 1954
- Running time: 102 minutes
- Country: West Germany
- Language: German

A Woman of Today (German: Eine Frau von heute) is a 1954 West German drama film directed by Paul Verhoeven and starring Luise Ullrich, Curd Jürgens and Carsta Löck. It was shot at the Bavaria Studios in Munich with location footage at the Brenner Pass and around Florence in Italy. The film's sets were designed by the art directors Franz Bi and Bruno Monden.

== Cast ==
- Luise Ullrich as Toni Bender
- Curd Jürgens as Heinz Bender
- Carsta Löck as Ida
- Marianne Brauns as Marie-Claire
- Robert Freitag as Aldo Mattei
- Annie Rosar as Frau Publik
- Heini Göbel as Hugo Beierle
- Otto Brüggemann
- Michl Lang
- Lis Van Essen

== Bibliography ==
- Daniela Berghahn. Hollywood Behind the Wall: The Cinema of East Germany. Manchester University Press, 2005.
