= Heini Göbel =

German actor

- Born: 15 May 1910; Frankfurt am Main, German Empire
- Died: 24 September 2009 (aged 99)
- Other name: Heinrich Göbel
- Occupation: Actor
- Years active: 1949–1996 (film)

Heini Göbel (1910–2009) was a German film, stage and television actor. In 1955 he portrayed Hercule Poirot in a German television adaptation of Agatha Christie's Murder on the Orient Express the first time the novel had been adapted for the screen.

== Selected filmography ==
- After the Rain Comes Sunshine (1949)
- Trouble in Paradise (1950)
- Two in One Suit (1950)
- Desires (1952)
- The Great Temptation (1952)
- My Name is Niki (1952)
- As Long as You're Near Me (1953)
- The Missing Miniature (1954)
- The Angel with the Flaming Sword (1954)
- A Woman of Today (1954)
- Hello, My Name Is Cox (1955)
- The Last Man (1955)
- I Know What I'm Living For (1955)
- Kitty and the Great Big World (1956)
- Marriages Forbidden (1957)
- The Spessart Inn (1958)
- Oh! This Bavaria! (1960)
- My Schoolfriend (1960)
- When the Music Plays at Wörthersee (1962)
- The Superwife (1996)

== Bibliography ==
- Aldridge, Mark. Agatha Christie on Screen. Springer, 2016.
- Bernthal, J.C. Agatha Christie: A Companion to the Mystery Fiction. McFarland, 2022.
