= Bendestorf =

- Municipality
- Coat of arms

- Location of Bendestorf within Harburg district
- Interactive map of Bendestorf
- Location within Germany Location within Lower Saxony
- Coordinates: 53°20′N 9°57′E
- Country: Germany
- State: Lower Saxony
- District: Harburg
- Municipal assoc.: Jesteburg

Government
  - Mayor: Bernd Beiersdorf

Area
  - Total: 3.88 km^{2} (1.50 sq mi)
- Elevation: 36 m (118 ft)

Population (2025-12-31)
  - Total: 2,329
  - Density: 600/km^{2} (1,550/sq mi)
- Time zone: UTC+01:00 (CET)
  - Summer (DST): UTC+02:00 (CEST)
- Postal codes: 21227
- Dialling codes: 04183
- Vehicle registration: WL

Bendestorf is a municipality in Lower Saxony in Germany. It is situated ca. 30 km south of Hamburg and belongs to the Landkreis (district) Harburg and the Samtgemeinde of Jesteburg.

The first mentioning of Bendestorf dates back to the year 970. The current population ist approximately 2300 (2022). In the post-war era Bendestorf was well known for its film-studios where movies starring Hildegard Knef (a.k.a. Hildegard Neff) and other famous German actors were produced.

== Sights ==
- The Makens-Huus on Poststraße, dating back to 1640 houses the municipal administration and the Filmmuseum, which is dedicated to the local postwar German movie production.
- Thiemann-Scheune (Thiemann-barn)
- Wassermühle (water mill)
- Hünengrab (giant's grave), a stone age graveyard from the Neolithic 2500 BC
