= The Threepenny Opera (1963 film) =

1963 film

- Directed by: Wolfgang Staudte
- Written by: Wolfgang Staudte; Günther Weisenborn
- Based on: The Threepenny Opera by Bertolt Brecht
- Produced by: Kurt Ulrich; Heinz Willeg
- Starring: Curd Jürgens; Hildegard Knef; Gert Fröbe
- Cinematography: Roger Fellous
- Edited by: Wolfgang Wehrum
- Music by: Kurt Weill
- Production companies: Kurt Ulrich Film; Comptoir d'Expansion Cinématographique
- Distributed by: Gloria Film
- Release date: 28 February 1963
- Running time: 124 minutes
- Countries: France; West Germany
- Language: German

The Threepenny Opera (German: Die Dreigroschenoper) is a 1963 West German-French musical crime drama film directed by Wolfgang Staudte and starring Curd Jürgens, Hildegard Knef and Gert Fröbe. Sammy Davis Jr. appeared as a street singer of ballads. It was shot in Eastmancolor at the Spandau Studios and Tempelhof Studios in West Berlin. The film's sets were designed by the art director Hein Heckroth. It is based on the 1928 play The Threepenny Opera by Bertolt Brecht, itself inspired by the 18th-century British work The Beggar's Opera. A previous film adaptation The Threepenny Opera had been produced in 1931.

== Plot ==
In Victorian London, the notorious criminal Captain Macheath is a wanted man but is protected by his friendship with the police officer 'Tiger' Brown, with whom he served in the British Army. When he marries Polly, the daughter of Peachum the "king of London's beggars", her parents set out to try and have him hanged by the authorities. He is ultimately betrayed by the prostitute Jenny, his former lover, and faces the gallows before a last-minute reprieve.

== Cast ==
- Curd Jürgens as Captain Macheath
- Hildegard Knef as Jenny Diver
- Gert Fröbe as J.J. Peachum
- Hilde Hildebrand as Mrs. Celia Peachum
- June Ritchie as Polly Peachum
- Lino Ventura as 'Tiger' Brown
- Marlene Warrlich as Lucy
- Walter Giller as Beggar Filch
- Hans W. Hamacher as Constable Smith
- Henning Schlüter as Reverend Kimball
- Hans Reiser as A Guide
- Siegfried Wischnewski as Matthias
- Walter Feuchtenberg as Jakob
- Stanislav Ledinek as Robert
- Martin Berliner as Wally the Weeper
- Max Strassberg as Ede
- Stefan Wigger as Jimmy
- Robert Manuel as First Hangman
- Jürgen Feindt as Second Hangman
- Adeline Wagner as Susy
- Erna Haffner as A Prostitute
- Clessia Wade as A Prostitute
- Jacqueline Pierreux as A Prostitute
- Sammy Davis Jr. as Ballad Singer

== Bibliography ==
- Bergfelder, Tim, Carter, Erica & Göktürk, Deniz. The German Cinema Book. Bloomsbury Publishing, 2020.
- Rentschler, Eric. German Film & Literature. Routledge, 2013.
