= Paula Braend =

German actress (1905–1989)

- Born: 1905
- Died: 1989 (aged 83–84)

Paula Braend (1905–1989) was a German actress.

== Selected filmography ==
- A Heart Beats for You (1949)
- After the Rain Comes Sunshine (1949)
- Die Alm an der Grenze (1951)
- The Blue Star of the South (1951)
- The Last Shot (1951)
- The Exchange (1952)
- Oh, You Dear Fridolin (1952)
- The Great Temptation (1952)
- House of Life (1952)
- Scandal at the Girls' School (1953)
- The Poacher (1953)
- The Bachelor Trap (1953)
- The Immortal Vagabond (1953)
- Cabaret (1954)
- The Czar and the Carpenter (1956)
- The Elephant in a China Shop (1958)
- Love Now, Pay Later (1959)
- Jacqueline (1959)
- Oh! This Bavaria! (1960)
- Beloved Augustin (1960)
- Sin with a Discount (1968)
- The Serpent's Egg (1977)
