= Clara (TV series) =

- Country of origin: Germany

Clara is a German television series.

== See also ==
- List of German television series
