= Jesteburg =

- Municipality
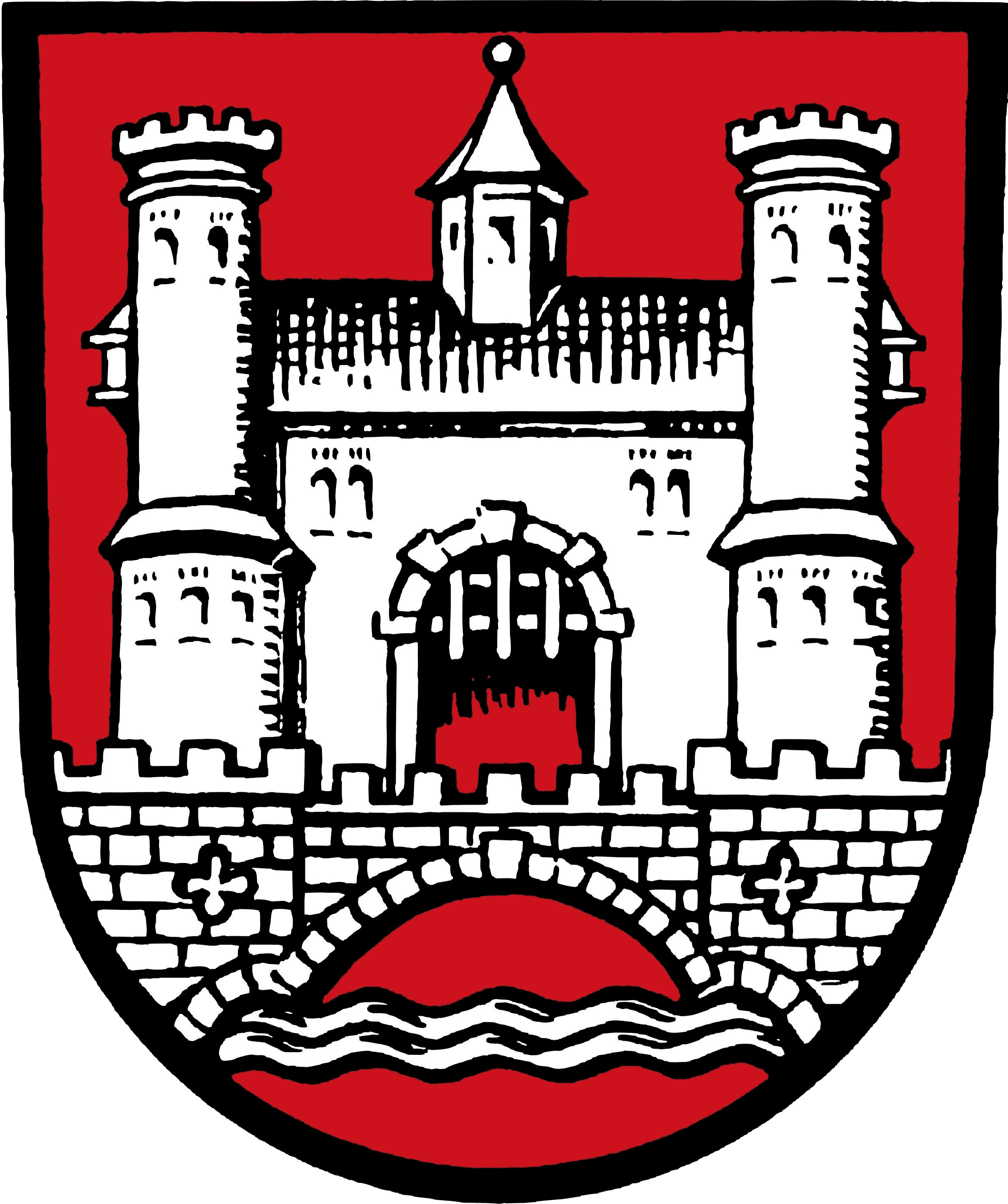
- Coat of arms

- Location of Jesteburg within Harburg district
- Interactive map of Jesteburg
- Location within Germany Location within Lower Saxony
- Coordinates: 53°18′28″N 09°57′15″E
- Country: Germany
- State: Lower Saxony
- District: Harburg
- Municipal assoc.: Jesteburg
- Subdivisions: 6

Government
  - Mayor: Udo Heitmann (SPD)

Area
  - Total: 27.97 km^{2} (10.80 sq mi)
- Elevation: 34 m (112 ft)

Population (2025-12-31)
  - Total: 7,758
  - Density: 277.4/km^{2} (718.4/sq mi)
- Time zone: UTC+01:00 (CET)
  - Summer (DST): UTC+02:00 (CEST)
- Postal codes: 21266
- Dialling codes: 04181, 04183
- Vehicle registration: WL

Jesteburg is a municipality in the district of Harburg, in Lower Saxony, Germany. It is situated approximately 25 km south of Hamburg, and 6 km east of Buchholz in der Nordheide.

Jesteburg is also the seat of the Samtgemeinde ("collective municipality") Jesteburg.

In Jesteburg lies the confluence of two small rivers, the Schmale Aue and the Seeve.

== History ==
The first official mentioning of Jesteburg dates back to the year 1202, in a document signed by the Hartwig II, Archbishop of Bremen.

The castle which gave the town its name is supposed to have guarded the Seeve passage until the 13th century. Remains of this Burg have not yet been found.

In 1872/73, the railroad between Buchholz in der Nordheide and Lüneburg which still runs through Jesteburg was built.

During an Allied air raid on nearby Hamburg in January 1943 incendiary bombs where dropped on Jesteburg, several buildings where destroyed. On 19 April 1945, the railroad bridge was blown up by the Wehrmacht to slow the advance of British troops.

Between 1933 and 1945 the population of Jesteburg nearly doubled, mostly due to refugees.

== Attractions ==
In 1986/87, the Heimathaus was re-erected on the Niedersachsenplatz. The Heimathaus is a 450-year-old building originally from Eyendorf.

The town of Jesteburg also hosts the Kunststätte Bossard, an expressionist Gesamtkunstwerk.
