= Ellen Schwanneke =

German dancer and actress

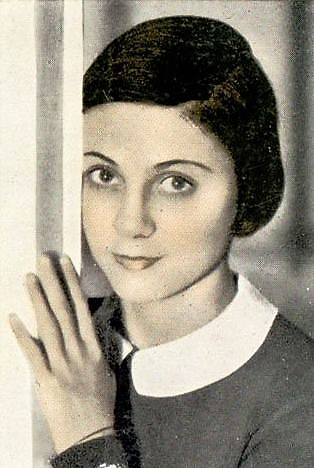
- Born: 11 August 1906; Berlin, German Empire
- Died: 16 June 1972 (aged 65); Zurich, Switzerland
- Occupation: Actress
- Years active: 1931–1948

Ellen Schwanneke (11 August 1906 – 16 June 1972) was a German dancer and stage and film actress.

She was the daughter of stage and film actor Viktor Schwanneke.

== Selected filmography ==
- Mädchen in Uniform (1931)
- Cadets (1931)
- Impossible Love (1932)
- A Mad Idea (1932)
- The Royal Waltz (1935)
- Not a Word About Love (1937)
- Everything Will Be Better in the Morning (1948)

== Bibliography ==
- Waldman, Harry. Nazi Films in America, 1933-1942. McFarland, 2008.
