= Fritz von Friedl (actor) =

Austrian actor (1941–2024)

- Born: 17 April 1941; Berlin, Nazi Germany
- Died: 9 October 2024 (aged 83); Vienna, Austria
- Occupation: Actor
- Years active: 1949–2024

Fritz von Friedl (17 April 1941 – 9 October 2024) was a German-born Austrian film and television actor. He began his career as a child actor in the early 1950s. His father was the Austrian cinematographer Fritz von Friedl, while his younger sister is the actress Loni von Friedl.

Von Friedl died on 9 October 2024, at the age of 83. He was the father of the actor Christoph von Friedl.

== Selected filmography ==
- 1951 The Merry Farmer
- 1952 Voices of Spring
- 1952 Ideal Woman Sought
- 1953 The Last Reserves
- 1953 Annaluise and Anton
- 1970 The Sex Nest
- 1970 Maximilian von Mexiko (TV)
- 1974 Karl May
- 1975 Permission to Kill
- 1985 Red Heat

== Bibliography ==
- Robert Von Dassanowsky. Austrian Cinema: A History. McFarland, 2005.
