= Oliver Grimm =

Swiss gymnast

- Born: 16 April 1969 (age 57)
- Height: 1.78 m (5 ft 10 in)

Gymnastics career
- Discipline: Men's artistic gymnastics
- Country represented: Switzerland
- Gym: Kunstturnervereinigung Schaffhausen

Oliver Grimm (born 16 April 1969) is a Swiss gymnast. He competed in eight events at the 1992 Summer Olympics.
