= Gerhard T. Buchholz =

German screenwriter

- Born: 1 January 1898; Mockrau, German Empire (now Poland)
- Died: 30 November 1970 (aged 72); West Berlin, West Germany
- Occupations: Screenwriter; Film producer Film director
- Years active: 1937-1963

Gerhard T. Buchholz (1 January 1898 – 30 November 1970) was a German screenwriter, film producer and director. He wrote for more than 20 films between 1937 and 1963. He was a member of the jury at the 8th Berlin International Film Festival.

== Selected filmography ==
- The Voice of the Heart (dir. Karlheinz Martin, 1937)
- The Jumping Jack (dir. Karlheinz Martin, 1938)
- The Rothschilds (dir. Erich Waschneck, 1940)
- Voice of the Heart (1942)
- Wild Bird (dir. Johannes Meyer, 1943)
- Why Are You Lying, Elisabeth? (1944)
- Thank You, I'm Fine (dir. Erich Waschneck, 1948)
- Amico (dir. Gerhard T. Buchholz, 1949)
- Turtledove General Delivery (dir. Gerhard T. Buchholz, 1952)
- No Way Back (dir. Victor Vicas, 1953)
- The Golden Plague (dir. John Brahm, 1954)
