= Barbara Rütting =

German actress (1927–2020)

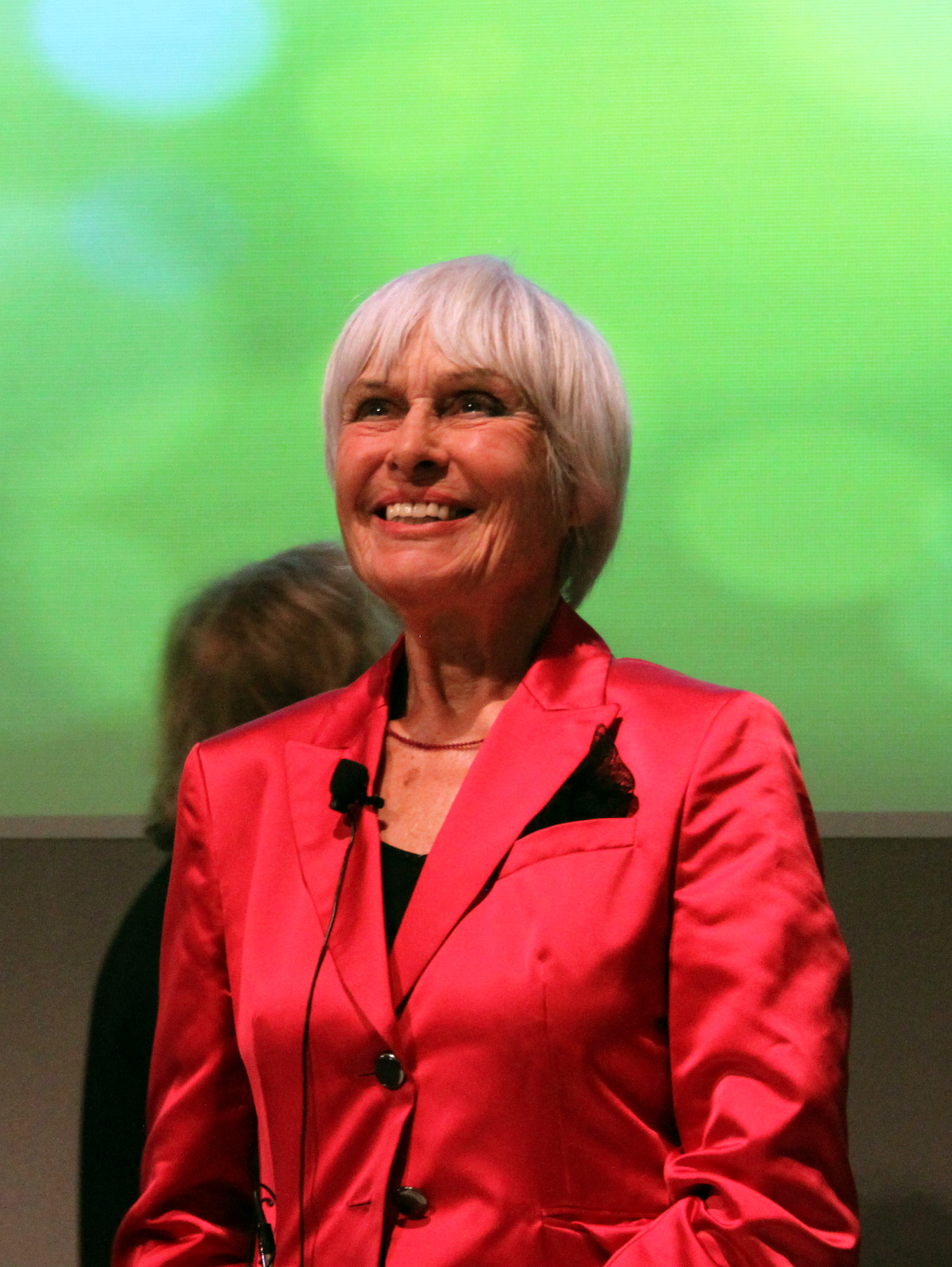
- Rütting in 2014
- Born: 21 November 1927; Ludwigsfelde-Wietstock, Germany
- Died: 28 March 2020 (aged 92); Marktheidenfeld, Germany
- Occupation: Actress
- Years active: 1952–2000
- Spouses: Hans Rütting (m. 1946; div. 1951) Heinrich Graf von Einsiedel (m. 1955; div. 1964)

Barbara Rütting (21 November 1927 – 28 March 2020), also known as Barbara Ruetting, was a German film actress, politician, author and vegetarianism activist. She appeared in 50 films between 1952 and 1979.

== Biography ==
Rütting won the German Film Award as Best New Actress of the Year in 1953. She was a star of German cinema in the 1950s and 1960s, appearing in Canaris with O. E. Hasse and in The Last Bridge with Maria Schell. One of her most notable film roles was the title role in the drama The Vulture Wally, released in 1956. In 1961, she played the female lead as a journalist in the American-German film Town Without Pity, co-starring Kirk Douglas and Christine Kaufmann.

After the 1970s, Rütting's film and television appearances were sporadic. She instead focused on her career as a writer of children's and lifestyle books. She was a vegetarian and became a vocal supporter of animal rights and environmental protection. She joined the Green Party in 1982, and was elected to the Bavarian parliament twice, in 2002 and 2008. She left the Greens in 2009, and became a member of V-Partei3 in 2016.

Rütting authored natural food cookbooks including a vegan cookbook in 2013. She died in 2020 at age 92.

== Partial filmography ==
- Turtledove General Delivery (1952) – Ilse Krüger
- All Clues Lead to Berlin (1952) – Tamara, Dolmetscherin
- Christina (1953) – Christina Neuhaus
- The Country Schoolmaster (1954) – Ursula Diewen
- The Last Bridge (1954) – Militza
- A Double Life (1954) – Sybil
- Canaris (1954) – Irene von Harbeck
- Espionage (1955) – Nadeschda
- A Girl Without Boundaries (1955) – Maria Johnson
- In Hamburg When the Nights Are Long (1956) – Karin Thorwaldt
- The Vulture Wally (1956) – Geierwally
- Rot ist die Liebe (1957) – Lisa
- Glücksritter (1957) – Alice Dreher
- Liebe, wie die Frau sie wünscht (1957) – Renate
- Die Freundin meines Mannes (1957) – Charlotte Bernhardt
- All the Sins of the Earth (1958) – Dr. Regine Lenz
- I Was All His (1958) – Anette Klinger
- Heart Without Mercy (1958) – Anja Wegener
- Un homme se penche sur son passé (1958) – Hannah Malloy
- A Time to Love and a Time to Die (1958) – Woman Guerrilla
- Ludmila (1958) – Marianne Ospel
- Frauensee (1958) – Martina Nissen
- Your Body Belongs to Me (1959) – Monika
- Arzt ohne Gewissen (1959) – Dr. Marianne Cordt
- Lysistrata (1961) – Lysistrata
- Town Without Pity (1961) – Inge Koerner
- The Shadows Grow Longer (1961) – Christa Andres
- Doctor Sibelius (1962) – Sabine Hellmann
- Love Has to Be Learned (1963) – Hermine
- The Squeaker (1963) – Beryl Stedman
- River of Evil 1963) – Susanne
- The Phantom of Soho (1964) – Clarinda Smith
- Operation Crossbow (1965) – Hanna Reitsch
- Neues vom Hexer (1965) – Margie Fielding
- Four Queens for an Ace (1966) – Miss Parker (uncredited)
- Tamara (1968) – Mutter Bricks
- A Woman Needs Loving (1969) – Helen
- Die Kramer (1969, TV series, 6 episodes) – Dr. Kramer
- The Deadly Avenger of Soho (1972) – Celia
- Der Kommissar: Ein Playboy segnet das Zeitliche (1975, TV series episode) – Frau Eber
- The Old Fox: Der Neue (1980, TV series episode) – Beate Wallner
- The Old Fox: Das letzte Wort hat die Tote (1980, TV series episode) – Brigitte Moland
- Derrick: Prozente (1981, TV series episode) – Frau Mertens
- Ein Fall für zwei: Das Haus in Frankreich (1981, TV series episode) – Birgit Weißenborn
- In the Land of Cockaigne (1981, TV film) – Adelheid Türkheimer
- Schwarz Rot Gold: Um Knopf und Kragen (1984, TV series episode) – Frau Lövenich
- Rosamunde Pilcher: Im Licht des Feuers (2000, TV series episode) – Catherine

== Selected publications ==
- 1976 Mein Kochbuch – naturgesunde Köstlichkeiten aus aller Welt
- 1979 Ach du grüner Kater (for children)
- 1979 Koch- und Spielbuch für Kinder
- 1985 Mein neues Kochbuch
- 1988 Mein Gesundheitsbuch
- 1991 Lieblingsmenüs aus meiner Vollwertküche
- 1993 Träumen allein genügt nicht
- 1997 Grüne Rezepte für den blauen Planeten
- Essen wir uns gesund. 30 Jahre unterwegs in Sachen Vollwerternährung, ISBN 3-7766-2293-8
- Lachen wir uns gesund. Anleitungen zum Glücklichsein. 3-7766-2236-9
- Bleiben wir schön gesund, ISBN 3-7766-2210-5
- Koch- und Spielbuch für Kinder vorgestellt von dem Kater Fettucini, ISBN 3-87287-509-4
- Ach du grüner Kater (Hörbuch) ISBN 3-936837-31-7
- Mein neues Kochbuch. Schlemmereien aus der Vollwertküche, ISBN 3-442-13760-8
- … und dennoch. Erfahrungen eines Lebens. Herbig Verlag, München, 2004
- 2007 Ich bin alt und das ist gut so. Meine Muntermacher aus acht gelebten Jahrzehnten. Nymphenburger Verlag, ISBN 3-485-01114-2
- 2013 Vegan und vollwertig: Meine Lieblingsmenus für Frühling, Sommer, Herbst und Winter Nymphenburger Verlag.
