= From Morning to Midnight =

Von morgens bis mitternachts is an expressionist play written by the German dramatist Georg Kaiser in 1912.

The play was banned by German censors for unclear reasons; contemporary accounts stated that the play was neither immoral nor anarchistic.

In 1917 the play was produced by the Austrian theatre director Max Reinhardt.

It was translated for the English stage as From Morn to Midnight: A Play in Seven Scenes by Ashley Dukes, and produced by the Stage Society to negative reviews.

A modern translation by Dennis Kelly was titled From Morning to Midnight.

== Major characters ==
- Clerk
- Italian Lady
- Mother, at the Clerk's home
- 2 Daughters, also at the Clerk's home
- Harlequin, who appears in the brothel scene
- Penitent Cyclist, who speaks during the Salvation Army meeting
- Salvation Army Officer, who makes a speech at the meeting
- Salvation Amy girl, who appears in a number of scenes.

== Production history ==
Although written in 1912, From Morning to Midnight was not staged until 1917, due to censorship by German authorities about its portrayal of the Kaiser.

In 2013, the play was staged at the National Theatre in London, with a cast including:

- Adam Godley – Clerk
- Gina Bellman – Italian Lady/Salvation Army Officer
- Eva Magyar – Mother
- Victoria Moseley and Emily Mytton – Daughters
- Victoria Moseley – Harlequin
- Esh Alladi – Penitent Cyclist
- Katherine Manners -Salvation Amy girl

== Adaptation ==
From Morn to Midnight (1920), the film adaptation directed by Karlheinz Martin

In 1920, a film version of the play, From Morn to Midnight was directed by Karlheinz Martin. In 2001, an opera by David Sawer based on the play, and also entitled From Morning to Midnight, was produced by English National Opera.
