= Boleslaw Barlog =

German theatre and film director

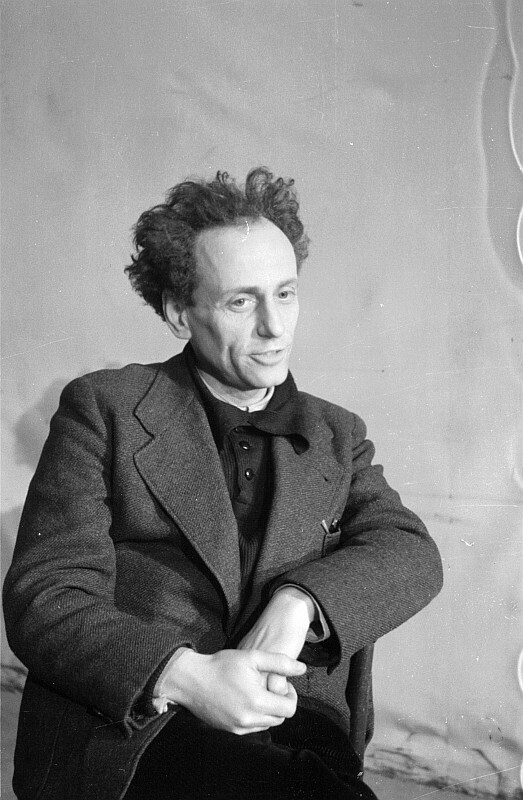
- Barlog in 1946
- Born: Boleslaw Stanislaus Barlog; 28 March 1906; Breslau, German Empire (now Wrocław, Poland)
- Died: 17 March 1999 (aged 92); Berlin, Germany
- Occupations: Stage and film director

Boleslaw Stanislaus Barlog (28 March 1906 – 17 March 1999) was a German stage, film, and opera director primarily known for his work in reviving the theatrical life of Berlin after World War II. From 1951 until 1972 he served as the Intendant of the Staatliche Schauspielbühnen Berlin, the municipal theatre company of West Berlin that at its height employed over 80 actors and operated three theatrical venues—Schiller Theater, Schiller Theater Werkstatt, and Schlosspark Theater.

== Life and career ==
Barlog was born in Breslau (then a city in the German Empire and now the Polish city of Wrocław). He was the son of a lawyer who later relocated the family to Berlin where Barlog received his secondary school education and initially worked as bookseller. He then began working as an assistant director to Karlheinz Martin and Heinz Hilpert at the Volksbühne theatre in Berlin. He lost his job there in 1933 after the Nazi Party took control of Germany, and worked in casual jobs for several years before obtaining a position as an assistant director for the German film company Universum Film AG. By the 1940s, he was directing his own films at Universum and at Terra Film.

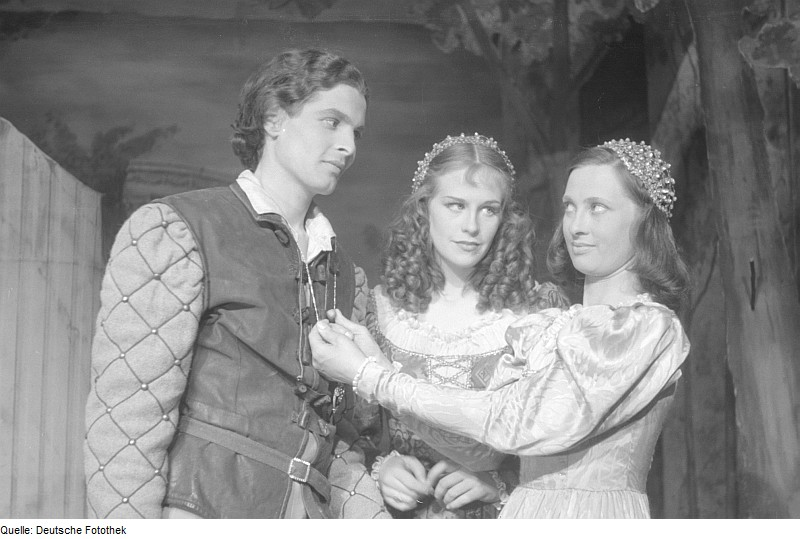
Scene from the 1946 production of As You Like It, directed by Barlog at Berlin's Schlosspark Theater

After World War II ended, Barlog returned to stage direction and worked to re-build the once-vibrant theatrical life of Berlin, actively lobbying, along with many other artists, to minimize the impact of Cold War tensions on the theatres, opera houses, and concert halls in the now-divided city. Most of Berlin's main theatres had been badly damaged or destroyed during the war and many of the first post-war performances were given in old cinemas or in the small, relatively unscathed, Schlosspark Theater on the outskirts of West Berlin. Barlog became the manager of the Schlosspark Theatre in 1945 and re-opened it with his production of Curt Goetz's Hokuspokus. Other plays which he directed there in the immediate post-war period were Romain Rolland's Le Jeu de l'amour et de la mort (1945), Shakespeare's As You Like It (1946) and The Taming of the Shrew (1947), Holm and Abbott's Three Men on a Horse (1946), Gogol's Marriage (1947) and Zuckmayer's Des Teufels General (1948).

In 1950 Barlog received the Berliner Kunstpreis (Berlin Arts Prize), and the following year he became the Generalintendant (general director) of the West Berlin municipal theatre company, Staatliche Schauspielbühnen Berlin, whose venues included the Schlosspark Theater and the newly re-built Schiller Theater. During Barlog's 21-year tenure as its Generalintendant, the company mounted over 100 productions, including the German premieres of Beckett's Waiting for Godot and Conor Cruise O'Brien's Murderous Angels and the world premieres of Günter Grass's Die Plebejer proben den Aufstand and Edward Albee's The Zoo Story. However, according to theatre scholar Michael Patterson, the final decade of his leadership was marked by an increasingly authoritarian and conservative stance and unadventurous repertoire which led to declining audiences. In a 1969 interview in Der Abend, Barlog attributed the audience decline at his theatres to the effect of television, hostile critics, and what he termed "spiritual smugness", remarking:

It will take care of itself in time. When people are worse off again, they will seek a spiritual experience, and their love for the church and the theatre will awake once more.

In 1972 Barlog retired as Generalintendant and was awarded the Grand Cross of the Order of Merit by the Federal Republic of Germany. The Staatliche Schauspielbühnen's fortunes continued to decline, and it was eventually dissolved in 1993. After his retirement as a theatre manager, he continued working throughout the 1970s as a stage and opera director in Berlin and other German cities as well as in Vienna and Salzburg. His original 1969 production of Tosca for the Deutsche Oper Berlin was still in that company's repertoire in 2025, his 1972 production of Salome is still running at Vienna State Opera. Barlog's autobiography, Theater lebenslänglich, was published in 1981.

Barlog died in Berlin in 1999 shortly before his 93rd birthday survived by his wife Herta (née Schuster), whom he had married in 1939. Both are buried in Berlin's Waldfriedhof Zehlendorf in a Grave of Honour.

== Selected filmography ==
- Young Hearts (1944)
- The Green Salon (1944)
- Where the Trains Go (1949)
