= Mela Spira =

Austrian writer

Mela Spira (born Melanie Hess; 10 October 1893 – 24 April 1967), known as Mela Hartwig, was an Austrian writer and painter.

== Biography ==
Mela Hartwig was born in Vienna, Austria-Hungary, the daughter of Catharina Hess and sociology professor Theodor Hartwig [de] and the elder sister of Grete Manschinger [de]. After the Matura, the Austrian baccalaureate, she enrolled at a Vienna conservatory to study singing and acting. From 1917 to 1921, she performed on various stages in Austria and was also a member of the Schiller Theater in Berlin. In 1921, she married the lawyer Robert Spira and left the stage to follow him to Graz.

In 1927, she published her first novella ("Das Verbrechen") for a competition in the newspaper Die literarische Welt, winning the prize. Her work was praised by Alfred Döblin (the judge of the competition) and Stefan Zweig, which led to the publication of the collection Ekstasen in 1928 by the Viennese publisher Zsolnay. The following year Das Weib ist ein Nichts was published.

Zsolnay rejected her next three manuscripts, describing in a letter from 16 March 1933 the incompatibility of the author’s “approach to life” with the new “worldview”. Das Wunder von Ulm was published in 1936 by Éditions du Phénix in Paris.

In 1938, after the Anschluss, the Spiras emigrated to London, where Mela worked as a translator. She met Virginia Woolf who helped her find a job as a language teacher. She later took up painting with some success.

She died in London in 1967 at the age of 73.

Many of her writings have been republished by Literaturverlag Droschl in Graz.

== Works ==
- Ekstasen, novellas (Zsolnay, 1928). Includes: "Das Verbrechen", "Der phantastische Paragraph", "Aufzeichnungen einer Häßlichen", and "Die Hexe"
- Das Weib ist ein Nichts, novel (Zsolnay, 1929; Droschl, 2002)
- Das Wunder von Ulm, novella (Phénix, 1936)
- Spiegelungen, poems (Gurlitt, 1953)
- "Georgslegende" (1960). Story published in Deutsche Rundschau (vol. 8, pp. 730–37)

=== Posthumously published ===
- Bin ich ein überflüssiger Mensch? novel written 1931–32 (Droschl, 2001). Am I a Redundant Human Being?, trans. Kerri A. Pierce (Dalkey Archive, 2010)
- Das Verbrechen, novellas and short stories (Droschl, 2004). Compiles Ekstasen (1928), "Das Kind", "Die Kündigung", "Der Meineid", Das Wunder von Ulm (1936) and "Georgslegende" (1960)
- Inferno, novel written 1946–48 (Droschl, 2018)

=== Unpublished ===
- Quer durch die Krise, short stories written 1932
- Der verlorene Traum, novel written 1943–44

== Sources ==
- (de) Mela Hartwig (1893 – 1967) Schauspielerin, Schriftstellerin; Austrian National Library
- (de) Wilhelm Sternfeld, Eva Tiedemann, 1970, Deutsche Exil-Litteratur 1933-1945 deuxième édition augmentée, Heidelberg, Verlag Lambert Schneider.
