= El Hakim =

1957 film

- Directed by: Rolf Thiele
- Written by: Herbert Reinecker
- Based on: Dr. Ibrahim (novel) by John Knittel
- Produced by: Luggi Waldleitner
- Starring: O.W. Fischer; Michael Ande; Nadja Tiller
- Cinematography: Klaus von Rautenfeld
- Edited by: Elisabeth Kleinert-Neumann
- Music by: Hans-Martin Majewski
- Production company: Roxy Film
- Distributed by: Neue Filmverleih
- Release date: 16 December 1957
- Running time: 110 minutes
- Country: West Germany
- Language: German
- Box office: $1 million

El Hakim is a 1957 West German drama film directed by Rolf Thiele and starring O.W. Fischer, Michael Ande and Nadja Tiller. It was shot in Eastmancolor at the Göttingen Studios and on location in Egypt. The film's sets were designed by the art directors Wolf Englert and Ernst Richter.

== Synopsis ==
A young Egyptian from a poor background qualifies as a doctor after studying medicine in Cairo. He becomes a successful doctor, not losing sight of his commitment to assist the poorest in society. He encounters Aziza, who falls in love with him, but he ignores her - becoming interested instead in the sophisticated Lady Avon, whose protegee he becomes. After years in London and Paris as a society doctor, he realises that Aziza was the right woman for him.

== Cast ==
- O.W. Fischer as Ibrahim
- Michael Ande as Ibrahim als Kind
- Nadja Tiller as Aziza
- Elisabeth Müller as Lady Avon
- Giulia Rubini as Heleni
- Charles Regnier as Dr. Kolali
- Robert Graf as Abubakr
- Jochen Blume as Dr. Ahmad
- Raoul Retzer as Basch Tamargy
- Tilla Durieux as Mutter des Hussni
- Harald Mannl as Michaelides
- Ulrich Beiger as Prinz Ali Hussni
- Klaus Behrendt as Dr. Maksoud
- Ilse Künkele as Miss Howard
- Soliman Gendy Soliman as Omar
- Gregor von Rezzori as Lord Avon
- Kurt Hepperlin as Dr. Lister
- Margarethe Andersen as Mrs. Cole
- Anna Fischer as Mrs. Wilcox

== Bibliography ==
- Bock, Hans-Michael & Bergfelder, Tim. The Concise CineGraph. Encyclopedia of German Cinema. Berghahn Books, 2009.
- Goble, Alan. The Complete Index to Literary Sources in Film. Walter de Gruyter, 1999.
