= The Green Salon =

1944 film

- German film poster
- German: Der grüne Salon
- Directed by: Boleslaw Barlog
- Written by: Hertha von Gebhardt (novel); Wolf Neumeister
- Produced by: Otto Lehmann
- Starring: Paul Klinger; Margarete Haagen; Dorothea Wieck
- Cinematography: Georg Krause
- Edited by: Ira Oberberg
- Music by: Werner Bochmann
- Production company: Terra Film
- Distributed by: Deutsche Filmvertriebs
- Release date: 26 December 1944
- Running time: 82 minutes
- Country: Germany
- Language: German

The Green Salon (German: Der grüne Salon) is a 1944 German drama film directed by Boleslaw Barlog and starring Paul Klinger, Margarete Haagen and Dorothea Wieck.

== Partial cast ==
- Renate Barken as Wilma
- Walter Bluhm as Oswin, handyman
- Hans Brausewetter as Dr. Artur Bütow, lawyer
- Lina Carstens as Klara, 'the horse', Anna Bütow's housekeeper
- Gerhard Dammann as Kniese, bricklayer
- Margarete Haagen as Frau Geheimrat Anna Bütow
- Lieselotte Heßler as Margarete v. Hintelmann, geb. Bütow
- Paul Klinger as Wolf Termöhl, cand.arch.
- Gunnar Möller as Jörgeli
- Ilse Pellemaier as Erna
- Willi Puhlmann as repairer
- Arthur Schröder as Georg v. Hintelmann, Ministerialrat
- Babsi Schultz-Reckewell as Inge von Hintelmann, daughter
- Jutta von Alpen as Sabine Bütow, her granddaughter
- Ally Waltemath as Annemarie
- Dorothea Wieck as Edith Retzlaff
- Ewald Wenck as Müller, Lohndiener
- Elisabeth Wendt as Lieselotte, his wife
- Adolf Ziegler as Eugen Retzlaff, broker
- Jan Hendriks as Bit Role
