= Tunis Top Secret =

1959 film

- Directed by: Bruno Paolinelli
- Written by: Bruno Paolinelli; Giorgio Rossi
- Produced by: Franco Cancellieri
- Starring: Elsa Martinelli; Giorgia Moll
- Cinematography: Armando Nannuzzi
- Music by: Pino Calvi
- Release date: 1959
- Language: Italian

Tunis Top Secret (Italian: Tunisi top secret, German: Akte Sahara – streng vertraulich) is a 1959 Italian-German adventure-spy film written and directed by Bruno Paolinelli and starring Elsa Martinelli and Giorgia Moll.

== Cast ==
- Elsa Martinelli as Kathy Sands
- Giorgia Moll as Simone Fredrick
- Raf Mattioli as Dr. Fuat / Seymour
- Claus Biederstaedt as Mr. George
- Gina Albert as Countess Barbara
- Willy Fritsch as Major Knickerbocker
- Chelo Alonso as Sherazad / Soraya
- Juan Santacreu as Fidia
- Giuseppe Porelli as Baron Philippe
- Massimo Serato as Nikos
- Luigi Bonos as Pedro
- Ignazio Dolce
