= Labyrinth (1959 film) =

- Directed by: Rolf Thiele
- Written by: Gladys Baker (novel); Gregor von Rezzori; Rolf Thiele
- Produced by: Walter Tjaden
- Starring: Nadja Tiller; Peter van Eyck; Amedeo Nazzari
- Cinematography: Klaus von Rautenfeld
- Edited by: Anneliese Schönnenbeck
- Music by: Hans-Martin Majewski
- Production companies: UFA; CEI Incom
- Distributed by: UFA
- Release date: 3 September 1959
- Running time: 95 minutes
- Countries: Italy; West Germany
- Language: German

Labyrinth (German: Labyrinth der Leidenschaften, Italian: Neurose) is a 1959 German-Italian drama film directed by Rolf Thiele and starring Nadja Tiller, Peter van Eyck and Amedeo Nazzari.

== Cast ==
- Nadja Tiller as Georgia
- Peter van Eyck as Ron Stevens
- Amedeo Nazzari as Professor De Lattre
- Nicole Badal as Mother Superior
- Matteo Spinola as Armand
- Elisabeth Flickenschildt as Frau Gretzer
- Benno Hoffmann as Beckmeyer
- Tilla Durieux as Schwester Celestine
- Fritz Eckhardt as Khan
- Piera Arico as Brotkugel
- Harald Kreutzberg as Sir Agamemnon
- Hanne Wieder as Priorin
- Werner Finck as Präsident
- Ljuba Welitsch as Ljubas
- Hans Leibelt as Padre Jeannot
- Ina Duscha as Juliette
- Tilo von Berlepsch as Graf
- Bobby Todd as Generaldirektor
- Eduard Linkers as Jacques
- Hugo Lindinger as Swoboda
- Anna Maria Lussi as Michèle
- Gregor von Rezzori as Schweizer Zöllner

== Bibliography ==
- Bock, Hans-Michael & Bergfelder, Tim. The Concise CineGraph. Encyclopedia of German Cinema. Berghahn Books, 2009.
