= Gina Albert =

German actress (born 1938)

- Born: 2 May 1938 (age 88)
- Occupation: Actress
- Years active: 1958–1959

Gina Albert is a film actress from the 1950s.

== Biography ==
Gina Albert was working as an accountant when she was discovered by Artur Brauner of the Berlin film studio CCC Film, who cast her in Mädchen in Uniform. The 1958 film, her first, was directed by Géza von Radványi, and starred Lilli Palmer, Romy Schneider and Therese Giehse. Albert played Margot von Raakow (Marga), a girl at a boarding school.

Albert played the starring role in the German-Brazilian co-production Tom Dooley – Held der grünen Hölle (Tumulto de Paixões, "The witch beneath the sea"), also known as Ruf der Wildnis ("Call of the wild"), which was shown in the 8th Berlin International Film Festival in 1958. Albert played Anna Martin, a young woman caught between two men, John Sutton and Richard Olizar. The film's director, Zygmunt Sulistrowski, was nominated for a Golden Bear.

Albert's next film was the crime drama Der Mann im Strom (1958) ("The man in the river"), with Hans Albers and Helmut Schmid. Albert played Lena Hinrichs, the female lead. The film was directed by Eugen York and adapted from the novel of Siegfried Lenz.

The last film in which she acted was the adventure-romance, Tunis Top Secret (1959), an Italian-German co-production by Bruno Paolinelli, starring Elsa Martinelli, Giorgia Moll, Raf Mattioli, Claus Biederstaedt, Gina Albert und Willy Fritsch. Albert played the Countess Barbara.

In 1959 she married an engineer, Manfred Haack, and withdrew from public life.
