= Mädchen in Uniform (1958 film) =

1958 film

- Film poster
- Directed by: Géza von Radványi
- Written by: Friedrich Dammann; Franz Hoellering; Christa Winsloe (play)
- Produced by: Artur Brauner; Joseph Spigler
- Starring: Lilli Palmer; Romy Schneider; Marthe Mercadier
- Cinematography: Werner Krien
- Edited by: Ira Oberberg
- Music by: Peter Sandloff
- Production companies: CCC Film; Productions Émile Natan; Société nouvelle de cinématographie
- Distributed by: Gloria Film
- Release date: 28 August 1958
- Running time: 95 minutes
- Countries: France; West Germany
- Language: German

Mädchen in Uniform (Girls in Uniform) is a 1958 French-West German drama film directed by Géza von Radványi and based on the play (credited here as Ritter Nérestan) by Christa Winsloe. The film stars Lilli Palmer, Romy Schneider and Therese Giehse.

It was entered into the 8th Berlin International Film Festival. It is a remake of the 1931 film. It was shot at the Spandau Studios in Berlin. The film's sets were designed by the art director Emil Hasler and Walter Kutz.

== Plot ==
Manuela von Meinhardis, in the care of an unfeeling aunt after her mother dies, is sent to a boarding school at Potsdam in 1910. The school is run under rigid Prussian discipline by the authoritarian headmistress. The only sympathetic teacher is Miss von Bernburg, who disagrees with the militaristic regime at the school and encourages the girls' self-expression through the arts. All of Manuela's affection is poured out on the attractive Miss von Bernburg, who says that she belongs to all the girls and cannot have favourites.

For the annual play, performed before parents and the princess who is patron of the school, Romeo and Juliet is chosen and the previously shy Manuela emerges as a forceful Romeo. Unfortunately, the cook puts rum in the punch served to the girls at the party after the play, where a drunken Manuela publicly proclaims her love for Miss von Bernburg. Telling Miss von Bernburg she must resign, the headmistress confines Manuela to the sanatorium.

When Manuela learns that Miss von Bernburg is leaving, she threatens to throw herself down the staircase in front of the whole school. After Miss von Bernburg begs her not to jump, she is seized by other girls and, in a state of collapse, taken back to the sanatorium. There the headmistress visits her and, in an unprecedented show of humanity, holds her hand while at the same time asking Miss von Bernburg to stay.

== Cast ==
- Lilli Palmer as Fräulein Elisabeth von Bernburg
- Romy Schneider as Manuela von Meinhardis
- Therese Giehse as Headmistress
- Margaret Jahnen as Miss Evans
- Blandine Ebinger as Fräulein von Racket
- Adelheid Seeck as Princess
- Gina Albert as Marga
- Sabine Sinjen as Ilse von Westhagen
- Christine Kaufmann as Mia
- Ulla Moritz as Jossy
- Danik Patisson as Alexandra von Treskow
- Ginette Pigeon as Edelgard von Kleist
- Marthe Mercadier as Madame Aubert
- Edith Helou as Baroness von Ehrenhardt

== Critical analysis and reception ==
=== Analysis ===
Author Veronika Mayer argues that "whereas the 1931 version is regarded as a lesbian classic in queer German cinema, the 1958 remake, however, is not even considered part of the lesbian genre." She further states that the 1958 version treats lesbian themes with much greater caution. The 1950s adaptation can be explained by the social and political climate of the time, characterized by a societal demand for a retreat into traditional, patriarchal values. Radványi's film deliberately ignored the lesbian themes of the 1930s version while attempting to profit from its reputation. Even with major stars Romy Schneider and Lily Palmer, it underperformed compared to the original. This lack of success stemmed from the narrative changes made to suit the conservative notions of the 1950s, specifically by minimizing the source material's rebellious edge and lesbian elements in favor of heterosexual and patriarchal repression.

Author Petruta Tatulescu contends that despite a kiss shared between Ms.von Bernburg and Manuela, their connection is defined less by physical attraction than by a subtle, unspoken understanding. Ms. von Bernburg's true feelings for her student remain ambiguous; while affection is evident, definitive proof of deeper romantic love is absent from the narrative. Tatulescu notes there is no reference to sex or being gay in the film; "there is no real lesbian environment and thus no lesbian life; so lesbian life takes place at a platonic level if at all."

=== Reception ===
Film critic Foumy Saisho wrote "the film handles with intelligence and considerable insight the central problem which has a fleeting suggestion of homosexuality; Manuela's possessive affection for Fraulein Bernburg does look very much like a case of homosexuality, and none of the details is spared in the film to blur that impression. Variety Magazine opined that this "remake is a disappointment for the generation able to recall the original, but should have some appeal to those to whom the subject is fresh; black and white photography would have helped in establishing the sombre discipline that prevails in the girls school; the use of color strikes a false glamour note."

Critic Michael Atkinson commented that "Radványi's post-war reboot doesn't approach the seething cataclysms of the original, partially because it's a more modern film; the degree of Euro-polish at hand doesn't abet the material either — the film was shot in Eastmancolor but with the antiseptic, pastel sheen so many mid-century German films had. Even so, Romy Schneider and Lilli Palmer are convincingly dewy and racked with sexual tension."

American film critic Bosley Crowther opined that "the 1931 version is vital and truthful where this one is pallid and slick and the old one breathes the air of German culture where this one breathes the air of Hollywood." He went on to state the "lesbianism in the original is told much more frankly and realistically, and dwelled upon, but here in this one, the nature of the attachment is merely sympathetic and sweet; the affection does not go beyond a light kiss on the cheek."
