= Love (1956 film) =

- Directed by: Horst Hächler
- Written by: Vicki Baum (novel); Jochen Huth
- Produced by: Artur Brauner; Horst Wendlandt
- Starring: Maria Schell; Raf Vallone; Eva Kotthaus
- Cinematography: Göran Strindberg
- Edited by: Ira Oberberg
- Music by: Hans-Martin Majewski
- Production companies: CCC Film; Cinematografica Esedra
- Distributed by: Variety Distribution
- Release date: 26 September 1956
- Running time: 96 minutes
- Countries: West Germany; Italy
- Language: German

Love (German: Liebe, Italian: Uragano sul Po) is a 1956 West German-Italian drama film directed by Horst Hächler and starring Maria Schell, Raf Vallone and Eva Kotthaus. It is an adaptation of the 1951 novel Vor Rehen wird gewarnt by Vicki Baum.

The film's sets were designed by the art director Rolf Zehetbauer. It was shot at the Spandau Studios in Berlin. Location shooting took place in Venice and along the Po River.

== Synopsis ==
Anna falls madly in love with an Italian violinist, who instead marries her sister Monika.

== Cast ==
- Maria Schell as Anna Ballard
- Raf Vallone as Andrea Ambaros
- Eva Kotthaus as Monika Ballard
- Camilla Spira as Frau Ballard
- Fritz Tillmann as Herr Ballard
- Peter Carsten as Jan Hopper
- Ave Ninchi as Beatrice
- Elke Aberle as Lorella
- Werner Schott as Arzt
- Wolfgang Jansen as Gärtnerjunge Kurt

== Bibliography ==
- Bock, Hans-Michael & Bergfelder, Tim. The Concise CineGraph. Encyclopedia of German Cinema. Berghahn Books, 2009.
