= Hans-Martin Majewski =

German composer (1911–1997)

- Born: 14 January 1911; Schlawe, Pomerania, German Empire
- Died: 1 January 1997 (aged 85); Bötersen, Lower Saxony, Germany
- Occupation: Composer
- Years active: 1939–1990 (film)

Hans-Martin Majewski (14 January 1911 – 1 January 1997) was a German composer of film scores.

== Selected filmography ==
- Escape in the Dark (1939)
- Blocked Signals (1948)
- Love '47 (1949)
- Amico (1949)
- My Niece Susanne (1950)
- When a Woman Loves (1950)
- The Blue Star of the South (1951)
- Weekend in Paradise (1952)
- Turtledove General Delivery (1952)
- Klettermaxe (1952)
- The Bogeyman (1953)
- No Way Back (1953)
- A Double Life (1954)
- She (1954)
- The Missing Miniature (1954)
- The Golden Plague (1954)
- Men at a Dangerous Age (1954)
- Ingrid – Die Geschichte eines Fotomodells (1955)
- Hello, My Name is Cox (1955)
- Master of Life and Death (1955)
- Heroism after Hours (1955)
- Alibi (1955)
- Urlaub auf Ehrenwort (1955)
- Ich suche Dich (1956)
- Without You All Is Darkness (1956)
- Kitty and the Great Big World (1956)
- Love (1956)
- Night of Decision (1956)
- My Husband's Getting Married Today (1956)
- Der Stern von Afrika (1957)
- El Hakim (1957)
- Confessions of Felix Krull (1957)
- The Mad Bomberg (1957)
- The Fox of Paris (1957)
- Man in the River (1958)
- The Copper (1958)
- Nasser Asphalt (1958)
- As Long as the Heart Still Beats (1958)
- Peter Voss, Thief of Millions (1958)
- It Happened Only Once (1958)
- The Muzzle (1958)
- Restless Night (1958)
- Die Brücke (1959)
- People in the Net (1959)
- Labyrinth (1959)
- Menschen im Hotel (1959)
- Adorable Arabella (1959)
- Boomerang (1960)
- Brandenburg Division (1960)
- Agatha, Stop That Murdering! (1960)
- Brainwashed (1960)
- Question 7 (1961)
- The Last of Mrs. Cheyney (1961)
- The Red Frenzy (1962)
- Escape from East Berlin (1962)
- Eleven Years and One Day (1963)
- Love Has to Be Learned (1963)
- The Visit (1964)
- Honour Among Thieves (1966)
- Ein Mann namens Harry Brent (1968, TV miniseries)
- The Standard (1977)
- High Society Limited (1982)

== Bibliography ==
- Bock, Hans-Michael & Bergfelder, Tim. The Concise Cinegraph: Encyclopaedia of German Cinema. Berghahn Books, 2009.
