= No Way Back (1953 film) =

1953 film

- Directed by: Victor Vicas
- Written by: Gregory Klimov (book); Gerhard T. Buchholz; Victor Vicas; Beate von Molo
- Produced by: Gerhard T. Buchholz; Stuart Schulberg
- Starring: Ivan Desny; Ruth Niehaus; René Deltgen
- Cinematography: Klaus von Rautenfeld
- Edited by: Ira Oberberg
- Music by: Hans-Martin Majewski
- Production companies: Occident Film Produktion; Trans-Rhein Film
- Distributed by: Hamburg-Film; Ring-Film
- Release date: 6 November 1953
- Running time: 95 minutes
- Country: Germany
- Language: German

No Way Back (German: Weg ohne Umkehr) is a 1953 West German drama film directed by Victor Vicas and starring Ivan Desny, Ruth Niehaus and René Deltgen. It was made at the height of the Cold War.

In 1945 following the Battle of Berlin, a Red Army officer is able to protect a young German woman he finds living in a cellar. Several years later he returns to the city as a civilian, finds her again and makes plans to flee from East to West Germany under the noses of the KGB.

== Cast ==
- Ivan Desny as Michael Zorin aka Mischa
- Ruth Niehaus as Anna Brückner
- René Deltgen as Major Kazanow
- Karl John as Friedrich Schultz
- Lila Kedrova as Ljuba
- Serge Beloussow as Litvinski
- Leonid Pylajew as Wassilij
- Alf Marholm as Direktor Berger
- Erika Dannhoff
- John Haggerty as Steve McCullough
- Wolfgang Neuss as Comedian
- Herbert von Boxberger
- Bogislav von Heyden
- Reinhard Kolldeh

== Bibliography ==
- Bock, Hans-Michael & Bergfelder, Tim. The Concise Cinegraph: Encyclopaedia of German Cinema. Berghahn Books, 2009.
