= Ira Oberberg =

German film editor (born 1918)

- Born: 25 May 1918; Moscow, Russian Empire
- Other name: Ira Bugajenko-Oberberg
- Occupation: Editor
- Years active: 1942–1967 (film & television)

Ira Oberberg (born Ira Bugajenko on 25 May 1918) is a German former film editor. Born in Moscow, the daughter of theatrical parents, she moved to Berlin at a young age. She was the half-sister of the cinematographer Igor Oberberg.

== Selected filmography ==
- Sky Hounds (1942)
- The Old Boss (1942)
- Love Premiere (1943)
- The Green Salon (1944)
- The Enchanted Day (1944)
- White Gold (1949)
- No Way Back (1953)
- Knall and Fall as Detectives (1953)
- Have Sunshine in Your Heart (1953)
- A Double Life (1954)
- The Beginning Was Sin (1954)
- You Can No Longer Remain Silent (1955)
- Love Without Illusions (1955)
- Master of Life and Death (1955)
- Love (1956)
- My Father, the Actor (1956)
- A Heart Returns Home (1956)
- Man in the River (1958)
- Mädchen in Uniform (1958)
- My Ninety Nine Brides (1958)
- Crime After School (1959)
- Mistress of the World (1960)
- Until Money Departs You (1960)
- The Dead Eyes of London (1961)
- Our House in Cameroon (1961)
- Sherlock Holmes and the Deadly Necklace (1962)
- Aurora Marriage Bureau (1962)
- Jack and Jenny (1963)

== Bibliography ==
- Greco, Joseph. The File on Robert Siodmak in Hollywood, 1941-1951. Universal-Publishers, 1999.
