= Master of Life and Death =

1955 film

- Directed by: Victor Vicas
- Written by: Frédéric Grendel; Horst Hächler; Victor Vicas
- Based on: Master of Life and Death by Carl Zuckmayer
- Produced by: Wenzel Lüdecke
- Starring: Maria Schell; Ivan Desny; Wilhelm Borchert
- Cinematography: Göran Strindberg
- Edited by: Ira Oberberg
- Music by: Hans-Martin Majewski
- Production company: Interwest
- Distributed by: Gloria Film
- Release date: 7 January 1955
- Running time: 87 minutes
- Country: West Germany
- Language: German

Master of Life and Death (German: Herr über Leben und Tod) is a 1955 West German drama film directed by Victor Vicas and starring Maria Schell, Ivan Desny and Wilhelm Borchert. It was shot at the Spandau Studios in West Berlin and on location around the city and in Brittany. The film's sets were designed by the art directors Hans Ledersteger and Ernst Richter. It is based on the 1938 novel of the same title by Carl Zuckmayer.

== Synopsis ==
Barbara is married to the distinguished professor of medicine Georg Bertram who once saved her father's life. When they have a mentally handicapped child together his clinical coldness comes to the fore and he wants to commit euthanasia on the child. She stops him and takes the child away to Brittany in the hope that a change of location and nursing will help them to improve. While there she encounters a much more sympathetic doctor.

== Cast ==
- Maria Schell as Barbara Bertram, geb. Hansen
- Ivan Desny as Dr. Daniel Karentis
- Wilhelm Borchert as Professor Georg Bertram
- Olga Limburg as Anna Bertram
- Walter Bluhm as Werner Hansen
- Fritz Tillmann as Dr. Peter
- Reinhold Bernt as Bahnwärter
- Harry Giese as Professor Reichert
- Héléna Manson as Louise Kerbrec
- Daniel Mendaille as Monsieur Kerbrec

== Bibliography ==
- Bock, Hans-Michael & Bergfelder, Tim. The Concise CineGraph. Encyclopedia of German Cinema. Berghahn Books, 2009.
- Goble, Alan. The Complete Index to Literary Sources in Film. Walter de Gruyter, 1999.
