= Amico (film) =

1949 film

- Directed by: Gerhard T. Buchholz
- Written by: Gerhard T. Buchholz; Hans Domnick
- Produced by: Hans Domnick
- Starring: Otto Wernicke; Margarete Haagen; Kirsten Heiberg
- Cinematography: Franz Weihmayr
- Edited by: Hans Domnick
- Music by: Hans-Martin Majewski
- Production company: Hans Domnick Filmproduktion
- Distributed by: Omnium-Film
- Release date: 7 April 1949
- Running time: 85 minutes
- Country: West Germany
- Language: German

Amico is a 1949 West German comedy film directed by Gerhard T. Buchholz and starring Otto Wernicke, Margarete Haagen, and Kirsten Heiberg. It was shot at the Göttingen Studios and on location around Kassel in Hesse. The film's sets were designed by the art director Walter Haag.

== Synopsis ==
The film focuses on a plush apartment building and its various occupants. It is owned by Robert Kornagel, a confectioner who comes into conflict with one of the new residents, retired stage actress Elisabeth Herzog, over her schnauzer called Amico.

== Cast ==
- Otto Wernicke as Robert Kornagel, Konditormeister
- Margarete Haagen as Elisabeth Herzog, ehem. Hofschauspielerin
- Kirsten Heiberg as Didi Roesch, Barbesitzerin
- Helmuth Rudolph as Dr. Heidenreich, Tierarzt
- Margit Kay as Helga Kornagel
- Hubert von Meyerinck as Schwarz, Oberkellner
- Günther Brackmann as Karl, Lehrling
- Gabriele Roden as Anni, Serviermädchen
- Lothar Geist as Pfeiffer, Geselle bei Kornagel
- Roma Bahn as Frau Mahlzahn
- Grethe Weiser as Frau Riebnitz
- Bob Iller as Heinz Klaus
- Tilo von Berlepsch as Freddy Müller
- Kurt Hepperlin as Dr. Galling
- Ingolf Kuntze as Jonny Dorten
- Eva Thomsen as Marianne Worms
- Inge von Mohr as Maria Binder
- Wolf Harro as Dirrmoser
- Erwin Pfeiffer as Friseur
- Hedwig Wangel as Frau Fiebig
- Karl-Heinz Peters as Herr Lantin
- Peter Rendalen as Baron
- Loni Cordes as Frau Busse
- Günter Kind as Friseur

== Bibliography ==
- Bock, Hans-Michael; Bergfelder, Tim, eds. (2009). The Concise Cinegraph: Encyclopaedia of German Cinema. New York: Berghahn Books. ISBN 978-1-57181-655-9.
