= Alf Marholm =

German actor (1918–2006)

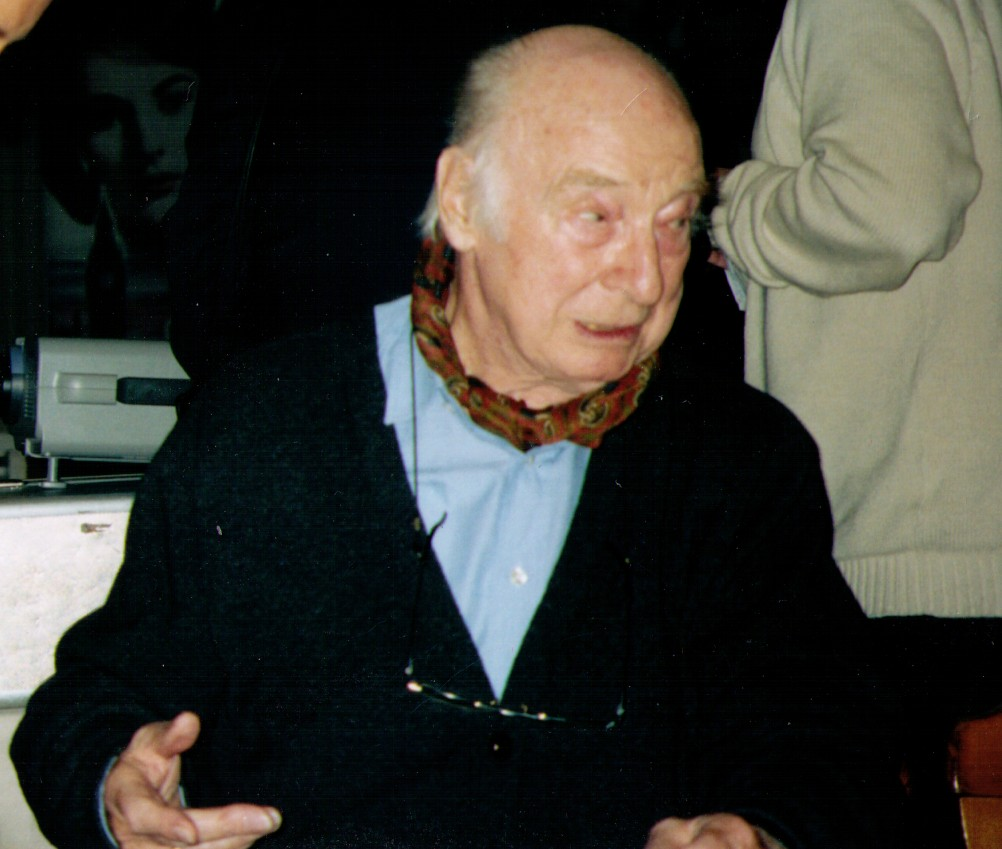
Alf Marholm during Edgar Wallace meeting

Alf Marholm (born May 31, 1918, as Alfons Stoffels in Oberhausen; died February 24, 2006, in Ittenbach) was a German actor, radio play performer, audiobook narrator, and voice actor.

== Partial filmography ==
- Turtledove General Delivery (1952) - Benno Perlitz, Zeichner
- No Way Back (1953) - Direktor Berger
- Die goldene Pest (1954)
- Viele kamen vorbei (1956) - Kreitz
- Von der Liebe besiegt (1956) - Richter
- Die Freundin meines Mannes (1957) - Modefachmann
- Schwarze Nylons - Heiße Nächte (1958) - Ricardo
- Lockvogel der Nacht (1959) - Albert Zanecki
- The Death Ship (1959) - Kapitän der Yorikke
- The Crimson Circle (1960) - Gefängnisdirektor (uncredited)
- The Terrible People (1960) - Richard Cravel
- Das Halstuch (1962, TV Mini-Series) - Inspektor Rowland
- Il terrore dei mantelli rossi (1963)
- Coffin from Hong Kong (1964) - Mr. Belling (voice, uncredited)
- Geissel des Fleisches (1965) - Verteidiger (voice, uncredited)
- Kiss Kiss, Kill Kill (1966) - O'Brien (voice, uncredited)
- The Stuff That Dreams Are Made Of (1972) - Kriminalrat Hering (uncredited)
- Tears of Blood (1972) - Vater Täumer
- All People Will Be Brothers (1973) - Delacorte
- Only the Wind Knows the Answer (1974) - Heinrich Hellmann (uncredited)
- Anita Drögemöller und die Ruhe an der Ruhr (1976) - Bongartz
- Son of Hitler (1979) - Judge
- Kolping (1986)
- Zurivý reportér (1987) - Jan Teply
- Lovec senzací (1989) - Séfredaktor
