= The Last Bridge =

1954 film directed by Helmut Käutner

- Film poster
- Directed by: Helmut Käutner
- Written by: Helmut Käutner; Norbert Kunze; Helmut Ashley; Rados Novakovic
- Produced by: Carl Szokoll
- Starring: Maria Schell; Bernhard Wicki; Barbara Rütting
- Cinematography: Elio Carniel
- Edited by: Hermine Diethelm; Paula Dvorak
- Music by: Karl de Groof
- Production companies: Cosmopol-Film; UFUS
- Distributed by: Columbia Film
- Release date: 11 February 1954
- Running time: 102 minutes
- Countries: Austria; Yugoslavia
- Language: German

The Last Bridge (German: Die Letzte Brücke) is a 1954 Austrian-Yugoslavian war drama film directed by Helmut Käutner and starring Maria Schell, Bernhard Wicki and Barbara Rütting. The film was entered into the 1954 Cannes Film Festival.

== Plot ==
A German nurse is captured by Yugoslav partisans, and with her devotion to medical duty finds herself with divided loyalty to both sides of the conflict.

== Production ==
The film's sets were designed by the art directors Otto Pischinger and Wolf Witzemann. Location shooting took place in Mostar, Počitelj and other locations along the Neretva valley in Bosnia.

== Cast ==
- Maria Schell as Dr. Helga Reinbeck
- Bernhard Wicki as Boro
- Barbara Rütting as Milica
- Carl Möhner as Martin Berger
- Pavle Mincić as Momcillo
- Horst Hächler as Leutnant Scherer
- Robert Meyn as Stabsartz Dr. Rottsieper
- Zvonko Žungul as Partisan Sava
- Tilla Durieux as Mara
- Fritz Eckhardt as Tilleke
- Janez Vrhovec as Partisan Vlaho
- Walter Regelsberger as Nachrichtensoldat
- Steffie Schwarz as Oberschwester
- Bata Stojanović as Partisan
- Stevo Petrović as Partisan Ratko
- Milan Nesić as Partisan
- Franz Eichberger as Gebirgsjäger
- Heinrich Einsiedel as Gebirgsjäger
- Pero Kostić as Partisan

== Bibliography ==
- Von Dassanowsky, Robert (2005). Austrian Cinema: A History. McFarland. ISBN 978-0-7864-2078-0.
