= Klaus von Rautenfeld =

- Born: 5 April 1909; Dorpat, Estonia, Russian Empire
- Died: 5 February 1982 (aged 72); Munich, Bavaria, West Germany
- Occupation: Cinematographer
- Years active: 1934-1971 (film)

Klaus von Rautenfeld (1909–1982) was a cinematographer. Of Baltic German origin, he was born in Estonia which was then part of the Russian Empire. During the 1930s he worked as an assistant cameraman for Luis Trenker. Following the Second World War he was very active in West German commercial cinema working on a mixture of thrillers and comedies.

== Selected filmography ==
- Condottieri (1937)
- Love Letters from Engadin (1938)
- The Fire Devil (1940)
- And If We Should Meet Again (1947)
- After the Rain Comes Sunshine (1949)
- Where the Trains Go (1949)
- The Tiger Akbar (1951)
- Stars Over Colombo (1953)
- No Way Back (1953)
- Elephant Fury (1953)
- Homesick for Germany (1954)
- The Red Prince (1954)
- Spring Song (1954)
- The Golden Plague (1954)
- The Blacksmith of St. Bartholomae (1955)
- A Girl Without Boundaries (1955)
- Royal Hunt in Ischl (1955)
- Scandal in Bad Ischl (1957)
- El Hakim (1957)
- Two Bavarians in the Jungle (1957)
- Arms and the Man (1958)
- Eva (1958)
- Peter Voss, Thief of Millions (1958)
- Peter Voss, Hero of the Day (1959)
- Labyrinth (1959)
- Abschied von den Wolken (1959)
- Stefanie in Rio (1960)
- Grounds for Divorce (1960)
- Girl from Hong Kong (1961)
- The Miracle of Father Malachia (1961)
- Barbara (1961)
- Between Shanghai and St. Pauli (1962)
- The Hot Port of Hong Kong (1962)
- Street of Temptation (1962)
- The Black Panther of Ratana (1963)
- Eleven Years and One Day (1963)
- Coffin from Hong Kong (1964)
- 13 Days to Die (1965)
- Kommissar X – Drei gelbe Katzen (1966)
- Take Off Your Clothes, Doll (1968)
- Hugo, the Woman Chaser (1969)
- Madame Bovary (1969)

== Bibliography ==
- Bergfelder, Tim. International Adventures: German Popular Cinema and European Co-Productions in the 1960s. Berghahn Books, 2005.
