= The Golden Plague (1954 film) =

1954 film

- German film poster
- German: Die goldene Pest
- Directed by: John Brahm
- Written by: Gerhard T. Buchholz; Kurt Joachim Fischer; Dieter Werner
- Produced by: Gerhard T. Buchholz; Walter Guse
- Starring: Ivan Desny; Karlheinz Böhm; Gertrud Kückelmann
- Cinematography: Klaus von Rautenfeld
- Edited by: Walter Boos; Wolfgang Flaum
- Music by: Hans-Martin Majewski
- Production company: Occident Film
- Distributed by: Allianz Filmverleih
- Release date: 30 December 1954
- Running time: 96 minutes
- Country: West Germany
- Language: German

The Golden Plague (German: Die goldene Pest) is a 1954 West German drama film directed by John Brahm and starring Ivan Desny, Karlheinz Böhm, and Gertrud Kückelmann. The film's sets were designed by the art director Alfred Bütow. Location shooting took place in Dotzheim and Kaiserslautern.

== Plot ==
Ivan Desny plays a disillusioned exile returning to Germany from the United States. The film centers around drug trafficking and the black market.

== Cast ==
- Ivan Desny as Sergeant Hartwig
- Karlheinz Böhm as Karl Hellmer
- Gertrud Kückelmann as Franziska Hellmer
- Wilfried Seyferth as Wenzeslaw Kolowrat
- Elise Aulinger as Johanna Neureither
- Heinz Hilpert as Tonder
- Ilse Fürstenberg as Mrs. Försterling
- Erich Ponto as Dr. Sierich
- Alexander Golling as Hamann
- Ethel Reschke as Lola
- Joachim Rake as Captain Tyler

== Reception ==
=== Award nominations ===
- Karlheinz Böhm was nominated for the 1955 Bambi Award best German actor
- Erich Ponto was nominated for the 1955 German Film Awards as best supporting actor

== See also ==
- Black Gravel (1961)
