= Man in the River =

1958 West German drama film by Eugen York

- Directed by: Eugen York
- Written by: Siegfried Lenz (novel); Jochen Huth
- Produced by: Artur Brauner; Helmut Ungerland
- Starring: Hans Albers; Gina Albert; Helmut Schmid; Jochen Brockmann
- Cinematography: Ekkehard Kyrath
- Edited by: Ira Oberberg
- Music by: Hans-Martin Majewski
- Production company: CCC Films
- Distributed by: Europa Film
- Release date: 15 August 1958
- Running time: 95 minutes
- Country: West Germany
- Language: German

Man in the River (German: Der Mann im Strom) is a 1958 West German drama film directed by Eugen York and starring Hans Albers, Gina Albert and Helmut Schmid. It was one of the final appearances of the veteran star Albers.

It was shot at the Spandau Studios in Berlin. The film's sets were designed by the art director Herbert Kirchhoff.

== Cast ==
- Hans Albers as Paul Hinrichs
- Gina Albert as Lena Hinrichs
- Helmut Schmid as Manfred Thelen
- Jochen Brockmann as Kuddel
- Hans Nielsen as Egon Iversen
- Roland Kaiser as Timm Hinrichs
- Carsta Löck as Sekretärin
- Josef Dahmen as Bergungsinspektor Garms
- Wolfgang Völz as Mike
- Ludwig Linkmann as Herr Buchmann
- Joseph Offenbach as Friseur
- Joachim Rathmann as Albert
- Maly Delschaft

== Bibliography ==
- Bock, Hans-Michael & Bergfelder, Tim. The Concise CineGraph. Encyclopedia of German Cinema. Berghahn Books, 2009.
