= A Girl Without Boundaries =

1955 film

- Directed by: Géza von Radványi
- Written by: Jacob Geis; Joachim Wedekind; Géza von Radványi
- Produced by: Harald Braun
- Starring: Sonja Ziemann; Ivan Desny; Barbara Rütting
- Cinematography: Klaus von Rautenfeld
- Edited by: René Le Hénaff
- Music by: Franz Grothe
- Production company: Neue Deutsche Filmgesellschaft
- Distributed by: Europa-Filmverleih
- Release date: 23 December 1955
- Running time: 104 minutes
- Country: West Germany
- Language: German

A Girl Without Boundaries (German: Mädchen ohne Grenzen) is a 1955 West German drama film directed by Géza von Radványi and starring Sonja Ziemann, Ivan Desny and Barbara Rütting. It was shot at the Bavaria Studios in Munich and on location in Athens, Fürstenfeldbruck and Munich-Riem Airport. The film's sets were designed by the art directors Hans Sohnle and Gottfried Will.

== Synopsis ==
A stewardess falls in love with a passenger, an industrialist, while on a trip to Athens. He proposes to her but she discovers that he already has a wife and child.

== Cast ==
- Sonja Ziemann as Helga Gruber
- Ivan Desny as Eric Johnson
- Barbara Rütting as Maria Johnson
- Claus Biederstaedt as Georg Hartman
- Maria Sebaldt as Lissy Wedekind
- Michael Janisch as Olaf Haagerlund
- Ginette Pigeon as Marion
- Louis de Funès
- Gabrielle Steffan
- Rolf von Nauckhoff
- Wolf Petersen
- Pero Alexander
- Michael Burk

== Bibliography ==
- Bock, Hans-Michael & Bergfelder, Tim. The Concise CineGraph. Encyclopedia of German Cinema. Berghahn Books, 2009.
- Wiesen, Jonathan. West German Industry and the Challenge of the Nazi Past: 1945–1955. University of North Carolina Press, 2004.
