= Horst Hächler =

German actor, film producer and director

- Born: 12 March 1926 (age 100); Hamburg, Germany
- Occupations: Actor, Producer, Director, Writer
- Years active: 1948–1987 (film)
- Spouse: Maria Schell (m. 1957; div. 1965)
- Children: 1

Horst Hächler (born 12 March 1926) is a German retired actor, film producer and director. He was married to the actress Maria Schell from 1957 to 1965.

== Selected filmography ==
- The Orplid Mystery (1950)
- Beloved Life (1953)
- The Last Bridge (1954)
- Master of Life and Death (1955)
- Hubertus Castle (1973)
- Zwei himmlische Dickschädel (1974)
- The Hunter of Fall (1974)
- Silence in the Forest (1976)
- Inn of the Sinful Daughters (1978)
- Lethal Obsession (1987)

=== Director ===
- Love (1956)
- As the Sea Rages (1959)
- Murder in Rio (1963)
- Waldrausch (1977)
- Laß das – ich haß’ das (1983)

== Bibliography ==
- Hannes Grandits & Karin Taylor. Yugoslavia's Sunny Side: A History of Tourism in Socialism (1950s-1980s). Central European University Press, 2010.
