= Turtledove General Delivery =

1952 West German comedy film

- Directed by: Gerhard T. Buchholz
- Written by: Gerhard T. Buchholz
- Produced by: Gerhard T. Buchholz
- Starring: Horst Niendorf; Barbara Rütting; Heinz Schacht
- Cinematography: Peter Zeller
- Edited by: Gertrud Hinz-Nischwitz
- Music by: Hans-Martin Majewski
- Production company: Occident Film
- Distributed by: Diamant-Filmverleih
- Release date: 29 July 1952
- Running time: 80 minutes
- Country: West Germany
- Language: German

Turtledove General Delivery (German: Postlagernd Turteltaube) is a 1952 West German comedy film directed by Gerhard T. Buchholz and starring Horst Niendorf, Barbara Rütting and Heinz Schacht. The title is a reference to the Poste restante mail service, which is used as a contact point by the film's characters. The film portrays a number of residents of East Germany who decide to escape to the West.

== Cast ==
- Horst Niendorf as Max Beutner
- Barbara Rütting as Ilse Krüger
- Heinz Schacht as Fürchtegott Plischke
- Ilse Parther as Ida Plischke, his wife
- Wolfgang Jansen as Ernst, their son
- Reinhard Kolldehoff
- Wolfgang Condrus as Gustav, their son
- Frietmar Wehner as Adolf, their son
- Hermann Schomberg as Professor Richard Gomoll
- Emilie Altvater as Jutta Gomoll, his wife
- Olga Limburg as Freifrau Hermione von Gilsen-Bernburg
- Alf Marholm as Benno Perlitz, draftsman
- Paul Albert Krumm as Wolfgang Hartung, editor
- Lu Säuberlich as Lena Forche, editor
- Ernst Stahl-Nachbaur as Arthur Gomoll, director
- Roma Bahn as Camilla Gomoll, his wife

== Bibliography ==
- Hans-Michael Bock and Tim Bergfelder. The Concise Cinegraph: An Encyclopedia of German Cinema. Berghahn Books, 2009.
