= Ivan Desny =

French actor (1922–2002)

- in German TV's Tatort: Kressin und der Mann mit dem gelben Koffer (1972)
- Born: Ivan Nikolaevich Desnitsky (Иван Николаевич Десницкий); 28 December 1922; Beijing, China
- Died: 13 April 2002 (aged 79); Ascona, Switzerland
- Education: Sciences Po
- Occupation: Actor

Ivan Desny (born Ivan Nikolaevich Desnitsky; Russian: Иван Николаевич Десницкий, 28 December 1922 – 13 April 2002) was a French actor of Russian Chinese origin. He had a lengthy career in French and German cinema, appearing in over 200 film and television roles over 50 years, and was a two-time German Film Award winner.

== Early life ==
Desny was born Ivan Nikolaevich Desnitsky (Russian: Иван Николаевич Десницкий) in Beijing, China. His Russian father, Nikolai Desnitsky, gained French citizenship and worked as a secretary at the French embassy. His mother was Swedish.

== Career ==
Desny was a film actor. Bilingual in French and German, he acted in more than 150 films, both in Germany and France.

In 1980, Desny received an honorary German Film Award for "his continued outstanding individual contributions to the german film over the years."

== Death ==
Desny died in Ascona, Switzerland.

== Selected filmography ==
- La fleur de l'âge (1947)
- Bonheur en location (1949) - Gordon junior
- Madeleine (1950) - Emile L'Anglier
- Les mousquetaires du roi (1951)
- The Respectful Prostitute (1952)) - Fred Clarke - le fils du sénateur
- The Lady Without Camelias (La signora senza camelie, 1953) - Bernardo 'Nardo' Rusconi
- Good Lord Without Confession (1953) - Maurice Fréjoul
- No Way Back (Weg ohne Umkehr, 1953) - Michael Zorin aka Mischa
- Act of Love (1953) - (uncredited)
- Confession Under Four Eyes (1954) - Gregor Marmara
- The Golden Plague (1954) - Sergeant Hartwig
- Master of Life and Death (1955) - Dr. Daniel Karentis
- Frou-Frou (1955) - Henry de Gaspard
- André and Ursula (1955) - André Duval
- Dunja (1955) - Minski
- A Girl Without Boundaries (1955) - Eric Johnson
- Lola Montès (1955) - Lieutenant Thomas James
- Ballerina (Rosen für Bettina, 1956) - Kostja Tomkoff, Choreograph
- Mannequins of Paris (1956) - Pierre Lanier
- The Story of Anastasia (1956) - Gleb Botkin
- Women's Club (1956) - Laurent Gauthier
- Anastasia (1956) - Prince Paul von Haraldberg
- The Night of the Storm (1957) - Viktor Ledin
- OSS 117 Is Not Dead (OSS 117 n'est pas mort, 1957) - Hubert Bonisseur de La Bath, alias OSS 117
- Von allen geliebt (1957) - Roger Marbeau
- Donnez-moi ma chance (1957) - Gilbert Arnaud
- Scandal in Bad Ischl (1957) - Graf Vanin
- All the Sins of the Earth (1958) - Lawyer Stephan Hardeck
- Petersburger Nächte (1958) - Alexander Drubin
- One Life (1958) - De Fourcheville
- Life Together (1958) - Michel Sellier
- Le Miroir à deux faces (1958) - Gérard Durieu
- Polikuschka (1958) - Verwalter
- Frauensee (1958) - Frederic Fleury
- What a Woman Dreams of in Springtime (1959) - Pierre Bonvant
- Heiße Ware (1959) - Paul Martens
- Monsieur Suzuki (1960) - Stankovitch
- Satan Tempts with Love (1960) - Carlos
- Song Without End (1960) - Prince Nicholas
- Femmine di lusso (1960) - Count Luca di Sauvin
- Geständnis einer Sechzehnjährigen (1961) - George Romanescu
- Daniella by Night (1961) - Count Castellani
- White Slave Ship (1961) - Captain Cooper
- Escapade in Florence (1962) - Count Roberto
- Number Six (1962) - Charles Valentine
- Bon Voyage! (1962) - Rudolph Hunschak
- Sherlock Holmes and the Deadly Necklace (1962) - Paul King
- Is Geraldine an Angel? (1963) - Jan
- Jack and Jenny (1963) - Wladimir
- The Invisible Terror (1963) - Prof. Lomm
- Frühstück mit dem Tod (1964) - Luke Adama
- Secret of the Sphinx (La sfinge sorride prima di morire - Stop Londra, 1964) - Green
- Kidnapped to Mystery Island (I misteri della giungla nera, 1964) - Maciadi
- DM-Killer (1965) - Der Amerikaner
- Captain from Toledo (1965) - Don Felipe
- Who Wants to Sleep? (Das Liebeskarussell, 1965) - Baron Rudolf
- The Beckett Affair (1966) - Frederick
- Tender Scoundrel (Tendre Voyou, 1966) - Le vendeur de Cannes
- The Death of a Double (1967) - Hoggan
- Da Berlino l'apocalisse (1967) - Steve
- I Killed Rasputin (1967) - Grand Duke Alexander
- Love Nights in the Taiga (1967) - Colonel Kirk
- Guns for San Sebastian (1968) - Col. Calleja
- Mayerling (1968) - Count Hoyos
- Rebus (1969) - Guinness
- The Adventures of Gerard (1970) - Gen. Lassalle
- Die Feuerzangenbowle (1970) - Marions Filmpartner
- Tatort: Kressin und der tote Mann im Fleet (1971, TV) - Sievers
- The Body in the Thames (1971) - Louis Stout
- The Hunted (1972) - Mailet
- Little Mother (1973) - Colonel Umberia
- World on a Wire (Welt am Draht, 1973, TV mini-series) - Günther Lause
- Sylvie (1973) - Ivan
- Who? (1974) - General Sturmer
- El juego del diablo (1975) - Teacher
- The Wrong Move (Falsche Bewegung, 1975) - Industrieller / The Industrialist
- Paper Tiger (1975) - Foreign Minister
- Shir Khofteh (1976)
- The Conquest of the Citadel (Die Eroberung der Zitadelle, 1977) - Faconi
- Halbe-Halbe (1977) - Baron Wurlitzer
- Red Rings of Fear (Enigma rosso, 1978) - Chief Inspector Louis Roccaglio
- The Marriage of Maria Braun (Die Ehe der Maria Braun, 1979) - Karl Oswald
- Bloodline (1979) - Jeweller
- Mathias Sandorf (1979, TV series) - Ladislaus Zathmary
- Berlin Alexanderplatz (1980, TV miniseries) - Herr Pums
- Car-napping (1980) - Consul Barnet
- Fabian (1980) - Justizrat Labude
- I Hate Blondes (Odio le bionde, 1980) - Mr. Brown
- Malou (1981) - Paul
- Exil (1981, TV miniseries) - Wiesener
- Lola (1981) - Wittich
- Ein gutes Land (1982)
- The Roaring Fifties (Die wilden Fünfziger, 1983) - Arzt
- The Future of Emily (Flügel und Fesseln, 1984) - Vater Charles
- Le Caviar rouge (1986) - Yuri
- Motten im Licht (1986)
- Hôtel de France (1987) - Maurice Veninger
- Un amore di donna (1988) - Avvocato Bernasconi
- Quicker Than the Eye (1988) - Schneider
- Good Evening, Mr. Wallenberg (God afton, Herr Wallenberg, 1990) - Schmidthuber
- La Désenchantée (1990) - L'oncle
- Zockerexpreß (1991)
- I Don't Kiss (J'embrasse pas, 1991) - Dimitri
- Thieves (Les Voleurs, 1996) - Victor
- Beresina, or the Last Days of Switzerland (Beresina oder Die letzten Tage der Schweiz, 1999) - Rudolf Stauffacher
- Mister Boogie (2000)

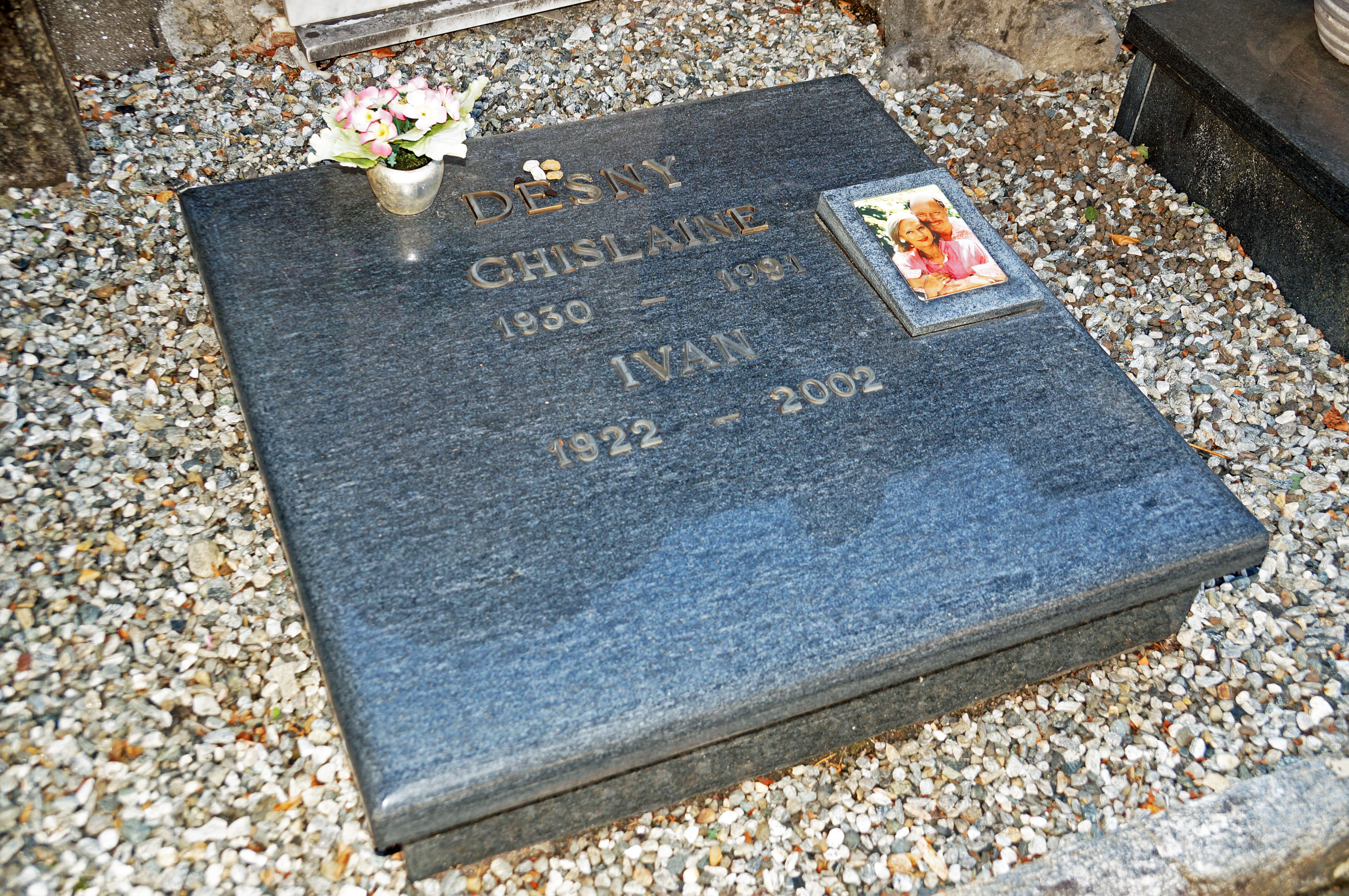
Desny's grave in Ascona
