= Where the Trains Go =

1949 film

- Directed by: Boleslaw Barlog
- Written by: Walter Ulbrich
- Produced by: Erich Holder
- Starring: Heidemarie Hatheyer; Carl Raddatz; Gunnar Möller
- Cinematography: Klaus von Rautenfeld
- Edited by: Fritz Stapenhorst
- Music by: Wolfgang Zeller
- Production company: Arbeitsgemeinschaft Film
- Distributed by: Prisma-Filmverleih
- Release date: 2 June 1949
- Running time: 98 minutes
- Country: Germany
- Language: German

Where the Trains Go (German: Wohin die Züge fahren) is a 1949 German drama film directed by Boleslaw Barlog and starring Heidemarie Hatheyer, Carl Raddatz and Gunnar Möller.

The film's sets were designed by the art director Carl Ludwig Kirmse. It was shot on location in Freiburg in the French Zone of Occupation. It is part of the tradition of rubble films made in Germany following the Second World War, similar in style to Italian neorealism.

== Cast ==
- Heidemarie Hatheyer as Fanny Förster
- Carl Raddatz as Max Engler
- Gunnar Möller as Gustav Dussmann
- Ursula Wedekind as Hannele
- Hannelore Rucker as Martha
- Oskar Höcker as Bahnpolizist
- Adelheid Seeck

== Bibliography ==
- Davidson, John & Hake, Sabine. Framing the Fifties: Cinema in a Divided Germany. Berghahn Books, 2007.
