= The House on the Moon =

1921 film directed by Karlheinz Martin

- Directed by: Karlheinz Martin
- Written by: Rudolf Leonhardt; Karlheinz Martin
- Starring: Leontine Kühnberg; Erich Pabst; Fritz Kortner
- Cinematography: Carl Hoffmann; Gotthardt Wolf
- Production company: Neos-Film
- Release date: 28 January 1921
- Country: Germany
- Languages: Silent; German intertitles

The House on the Moon (German: Das Haus zum Mond) is a 1921 German silent science fiction film directed by Karlheinz Martin and starring Leontine Kühnberg, Erich Pabst and Fritz Kortner. Shot at the Johannisthal Studios in an expressionist style, it is now considered a lost film.

The film's sets were designed by the art director Robert Neppach.

== Cast ==
- Leontine Kühnberg as Bettina - seine Frau / Luna - seine Tochter
- Erich Pabst as Nathanael - Astronom
- Fritz Kortner as Jan van Haag - Wachsfigurenhändler
- Paul Graetz as Kornill - Schauspieler
- Hans Schweikart as Fabian - sein Sohn
- Käthe Burga as Pirzel - Kellnerin
- Max Gülstorff as Just - Actuarius
- Frida Richard as Julchen - seine Frau
- Annemarie Mörike as Minchen - seine Tochter
- Leopold von Ledebur as Peter Pol - Kohlenhändler
- Sophie Pagay as Babett - seine Frau
- Gustav von Wangenheim as Andreas, sein Sohn
- Hugo Döblin as Schlinge - Gerichtsvollzieher
- Max Adalbert
- Hans Heinrich von Twardowski
- Rosa Valetti

== Bibliography ==
- Ian Aitken. European Film Theory and Cinema: A Critical Introduction. Indiana University Press, 2001.
