= Wild Bird (film) =

1943 film

- Directed by: Johannes Meyer
- Written by: Gerhard T. Buchholz; Ernõ Innocent Vincze (play); Paul Nundorf
- Produced by: Otto Ernst Lubitz
- Starring: Leny Marenbach; Volker von Collande; Werner Hinz
- Cinematography: Karl Hasselmann
- Edited by: Johanna Schmidt
- Music by: Frank Fox
- Production company: Berlin Film
- Distributed by: Deutsche Filmvertriebs
- Release date: 21 December 1943
- Running time: 87 minutes
- Country: Germany
- Language: German

Wild Bird (German: Wildvogel) is a 1943 German romance film directed by Johannes Meyer and starring Leny Marenbach, Volker von Collande and Werner Hinz.

The film's sets were designed by the art directors Gustav A. Knauer and Arthur Schwarz. Filming took place in Berlin and the Tyrol.

== Cast ==
- Leny Marenbach as Vika von Demnitz
- Volker von Collande as Wolff
- Werner Hinz as Professor Lossen
- Käthe Haack as Tante Argate
- Herbert Hübner as Herr von Demnitz
- Roma Bahn as Britta von Dermnitz
- Reinhold Pasch as Dr. Schütte
- Heinrich Marlow as Präsident Weichbrodt
- Ellen Hille as Resi
- Beppo Brem as Franzl
- Josef Eichheim as Joseph
- Vera Complojer as Josefa
- Ernst Waldow as Reisender
- Hertha von Walther as Bergsteigerin
- Hanns Waschatko as Hotelportier
- Greta Schröder as Jutta Lossen

== Bibliography ==
- Rentschler, Eric. The Ministry of Illusion: Nazi Cinema and Its Afterlife. Harvard University Press, 1996.
