= Roma Bahn =

German actress

- Born: 30 October 1896; Berlin, German Empire
- Died: 11 January 1975 (aged 78); Bonn, West Germany
- Occupation: Actor
- Years active: 1919–1972 (film)

Roma Bahn (1896–1975) was a German stage and film actress. On stage she was notable for her performances as Polly in the original 1928 production of The Threepenny Opera. In cinema she played supporting roles in films made during the Weimar and Nazi eras.

== Selected filmography ==
- From Morn to Midnight (1920)
- Unheimliche Geschichten (1932)
- Anna and Elizabeth (1933)
- Scandal at the Fledermaus (1936)
- The Girl Irene (1936)
- The Deruga Case (1938)
- Two Women (1938)
- Rubber (1938)
- Three Fathers for Anna (1939)
- Detours to Happiness (1939)
- Police Report (1939)
- Madame Butterfly (1939)
- Diesel (1942)
- Voice of the Heart (1942)
- My Friend Josephine (1942)
- The Crew of the Dora (1943)
- An Old Heart Becomes Young Again (1943)
- The Dark Day (1943)
- Light of Heart (1943)
- Wild Bird (1943)
- Mask in Blue (1943)
- Harald Arrives at Nine (1944)
- The Wedding Hotel (1944)
- Amico (1949)
- Turtledove General Delivery (1952)
- The Phantom of the Big Tent (1954)
- Like Once Lili Marleen (1956)
- Confess, Doctor Corda (1958)

== Bibliography ==
- John Fuegi. Brecht and Company: Sex, Politics, and the Making of the Modern Drama. Grove Press, 2002.
