= Schiller Theater =

Theatre in Berlin, Germany

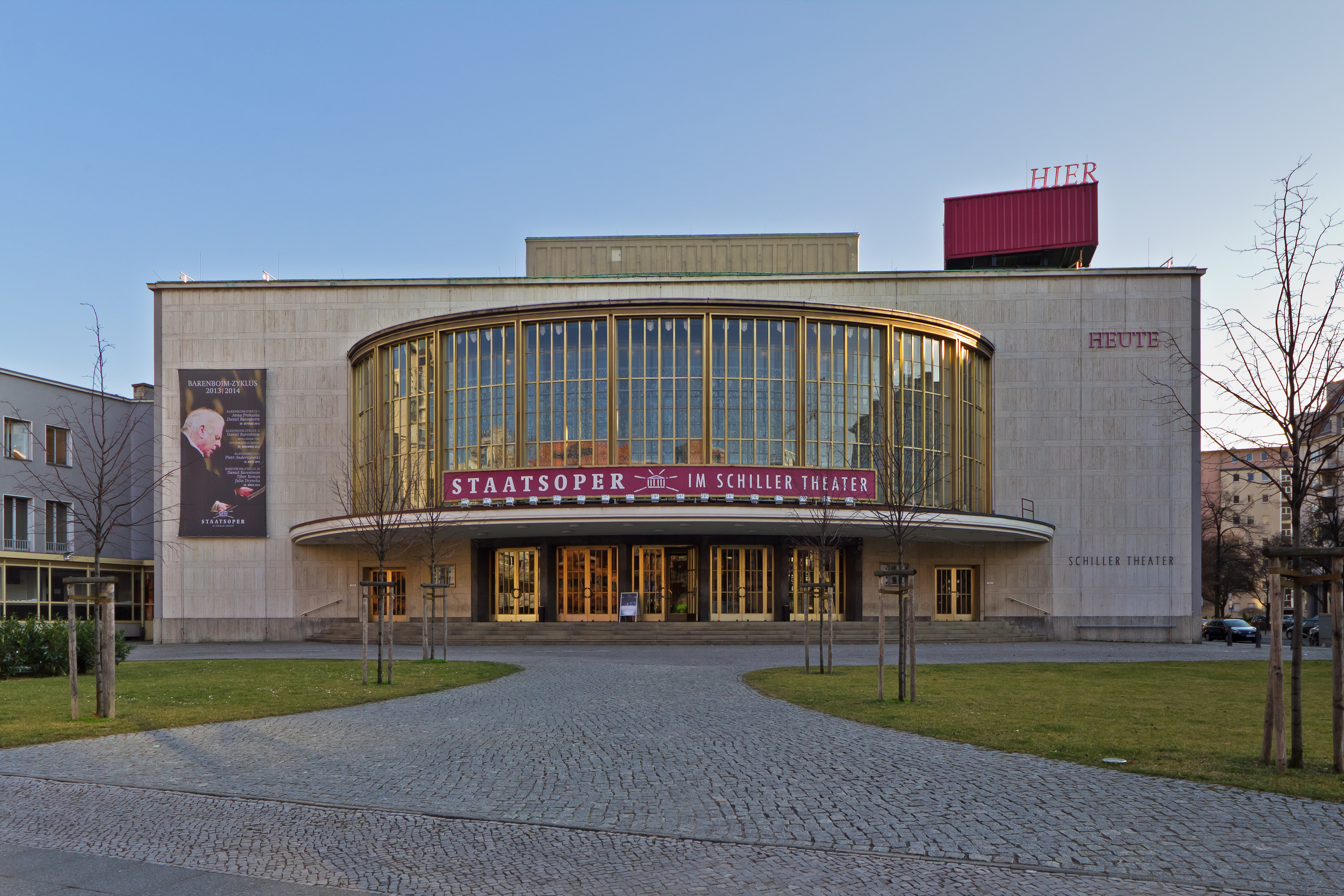
- Interactive map of Schiller Theater
- Former names: Schiller-Theater der Reichshauptstadt Berlin
- Address: Bismarckstraße 110; Berlin; Germany
- Coordinates: 52°30′42.15″N 13°19′5.01″E
- Type: Theatre

Construction
- Groundbreaking: 1905
- Opened: 1 January 1907

The Schiller Theater is a theatre building in Berlin, Germany. It is located in the central Charlottenburg district at Bismarckstraße 110, near Ernst-Reuter-Platz.

Opened in 1907, the building served as a second venue for the Prussian State Theatre company in the 1920s and 1930s. After post-war rebuilding, it was the main stage of the Berlin State Theatres from 1951, until in 1993, the City Senate decided to close it for financial reasons. Since then, it has been rented out for theatre performances and other events, and was used by the Berlin State Opera as an interim venue during extensive renovation work from 2010 to 2017.

== History ==
The Schiller Theater was built from 1905 to 1906 according to plans by the Munich architect Max Littmann on behalf of Schiller-Theater company and the then-independent city of Charlottenburg. Littmann, founder of the Heilmann & Littmann contracting business, had considerable experience in theatre architecture, having designed and built the Munich Prinzregententheater and Kammerspiele in 1900–1901. The building complex comprised a theatre hall, a multipurpose room, as well as a restaurant. The sculptural decorations were designed by the sculptors Düll and Petzold, and the decoration of the auditorium and the painted curtain is by Julius Mössel.

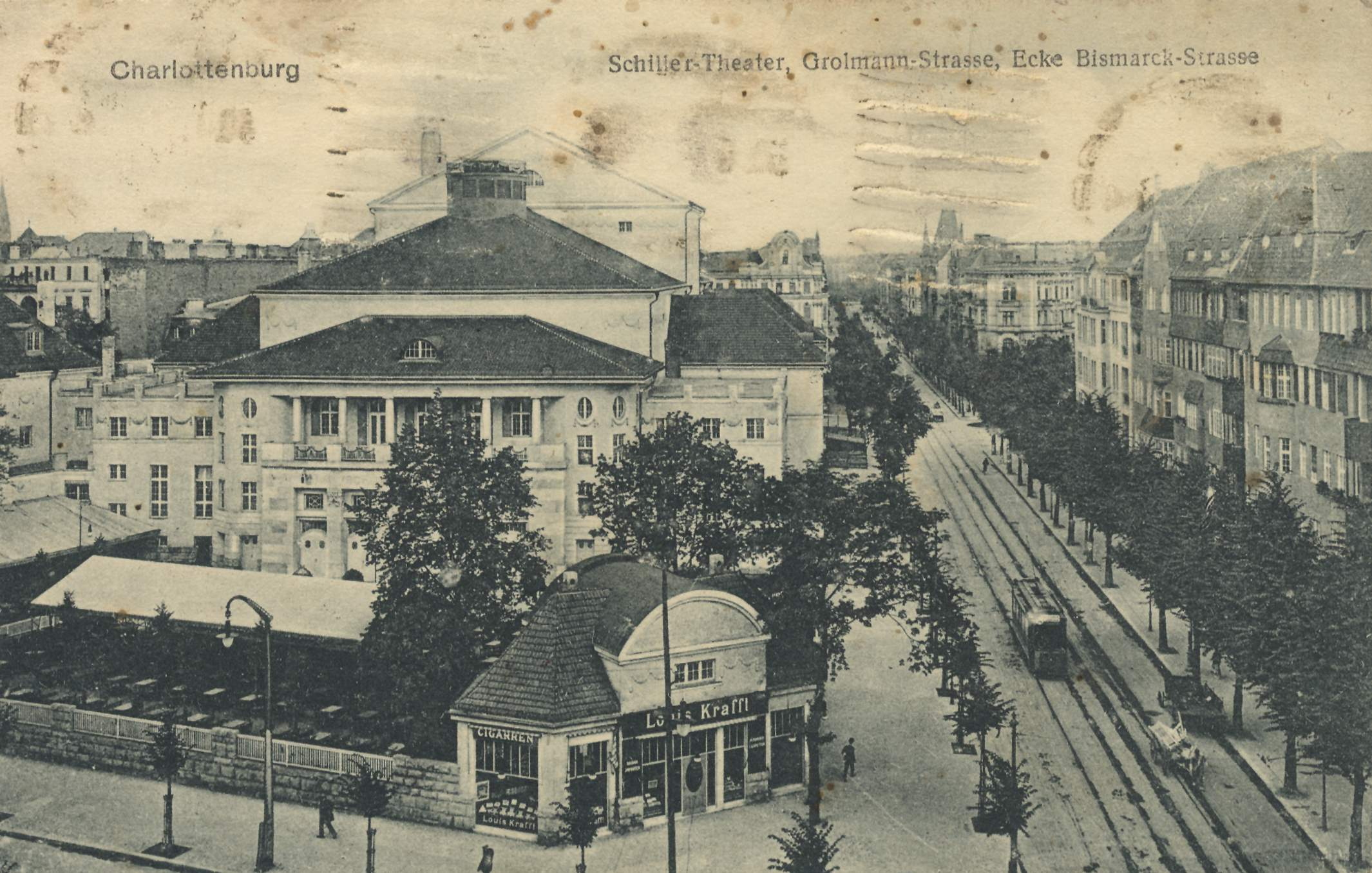
Schiller Theater, circa 1919

The 1,194-seat theatre was opened on 1 January 1907 with Die Räuber by Friedrich Schiller, and continued to be run by the Schiller-Theater-Gesellschaft with their own theatre company. Established as part of the "People's Theatre" (Volksbühne) movement, the Slavicist and intellectual Raphael Löwenfeld, founding member of the Central Association of German Citizens of the Jewish Faith, was the initiator and manager of the original ensemble. He had already inaugurated a Schiller Theater Ost in Berlin's Königstadt quarter in 1894 and a Schiller Theater Nord in the Oranienburger Vorstadt in 1896. Likewise, the Charlottenburg venue was meant to provide socially marginalised groups with access to stage plays by Henrik Ibsen, Gerhart Hauptmann, and particularly Leo Tolstoi, whose works Löwenfeld himself had translated into German.

After World War I, from June 1921, the building was the second venue of the Prussian State Theatre (Preußisches Staatstheater Berlin), whose main venue was the present-day Konzerthaus Berlin at Gendarmenmarkt in the Mitte district. After the Nazi seizure of power, the Prussian prime minister Hermann Göring had the Schiller Theater transferred into the possession of the City of Berlin in December 1933.

From 1937 to 1938, the theatre was extensively rebuilt according to plans designed by Paul Baumgarten. Baumgarten simplified the facade and the auditorium considerably, changing the appearance of the theatre with respect to the New Objectivity of the 1920s, but also in line with the prevailing monumental Nazi architecture trend. A special state box (Führerloge) was installed in the auditorium. The sculptors Paul Scheurich and Karl Nocke and the painter Albert Birkle were involved in the conversion. From the re-opening with Schiller's Kabale und Liebe in the presence of Adolf Hitler on 15 November 1938, the theatre was run as Schiller-Theater der Reichshauptstadt Berlin. The famous actor Heinrich George was employed as general director, acting under the pseudonym of Heinrich Schmitz. During the bombing of Berlin in World War II, the auditorium was destroyed in a RAF air strike on the night of 22/23 November 1943. Performances continued on a provisional stage until the theatre finally closed in September 1944.

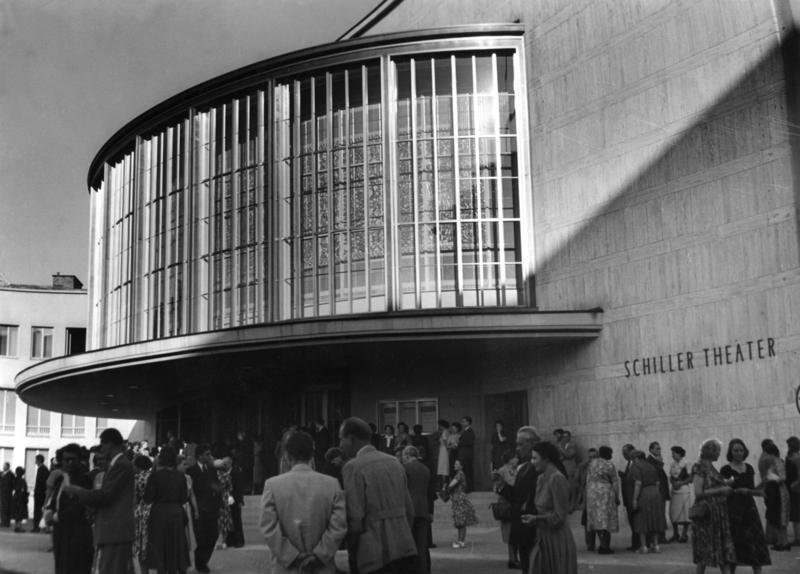
Schiller Theater, 1953

After the war, the Schiller Theater was rebuilt from 1950 on behalf of the city of West Berlin according to plans by the architects Heinz Völker and Rolf Grosse. Some parts of the ruins of the old theatre were reused for the new construction. The main foyer received a large glass wall and the hallway was adorned with sculptures created by Bernhard Heiliger. The reopening was solemnly celebrated by a concert of the Berlin Philharmonic orchestra under Wilhelm Furtwängler on 5 September 1951, followed by a performance of Schiller's Wilhelm Tell the next evening.

The new theatre had 1,067 seats, and served as the Großes Haus, the main venue, for the Berlin State Theatres (Staatlichen Schauspielbühnen Berlin), beside the Schlosspark Theater in the Steglitz district as Kleines Haus, the second venue. The State Theatres also used the Schiller-Theater Werkstatt in the building of the Schiller Theater (now a second venue of the Grips-Theater company), and the Ballhaus Rixdorf in Berlin-Neukölln as further stages. Under the management of Boleslaw Barlog, the Schiller Theater became the leading West Berlin stage, only rivalled by the Schaubühne ensemble around Peter Stein from the 1970s onwards. Among the most famous managers of the Berlin State Theatres were Hans Lietzau, Boy Gobert, and Heribert Sasse. Notable directors included Gustaf Gründgens, Jürgen Fehling, Samuel Beckett, Fritz Kortner, Boleslaw Barlog, Hans Lietzau, Karl Paryla, George Tabori, Hans Neuenfels, Hans Hollmann, and Peter Zadek.

After lengthy discussions, the Schiller Theater was closed on 3 October 1993, three years after German reunification, on a decision of the Berlin Senate due to the increasing indebtedness of the city. The last performance of the state theatre was the premiere of the play Weißalles und Dickedumm (Quisaitout et Grobêta) by Coline Serreau, starring Katharina Thalbach. All permanently employed staff and artists, including Bernhard Minetti, Erich Schellow, and Sabine Sinjen, were dismissed. The closure of the largest German-speaking stage sparked protest and resentment, and the Senator for Culture at that time, Ulrich Roloff-Momin, was given the name "Schiller-Killer". It was then used as a venue for musicals and guest theatre performances. From January to October 2000, the Maxim-Gorki-Theater used the stage of the Schiller Theater.

== Replacement venue for the Staatsoper ==
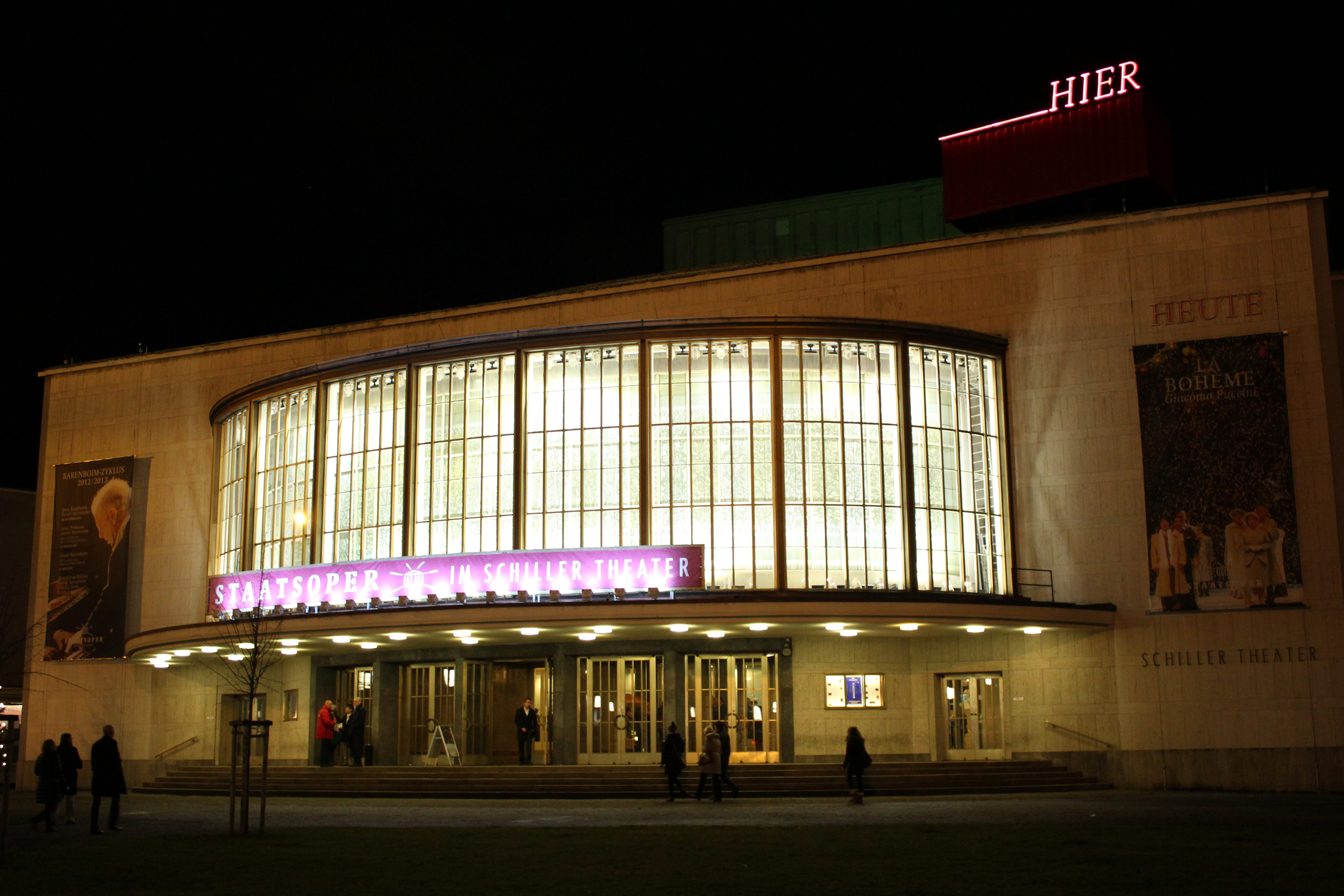
State Opera in the Schiller Theater, 2012

When the Staatsoper Unter den Linden had to close on 31 May 2010 for renovation, the company and the Staatskapelle Berlin were accommodated in the Schiller Theater. Reconstruction work began in June 2010 and was expected to cost 239 million euros. The Staatsoper was expected to stay at the Schiller Theater for three years, but eventually stayed for seven.

The first opera premiere in the temporary venue took place on 3 October 2010.

== Actors ==
Actors who have appeared in leading roles in the Schiller Theater include the following:

- Kerstin de Ahna
- Horst Bollmann
- Suzanne von Borsody
- Claus Clausen
- Ernst Deutsch
- Käthe Dorsch
- Berta Drews
- Rosemarie Fendel
- Heino Ferch
- Joana Maria Gorvin
- Carla Hagen
- Uta Hallant
- Martin Held
- Karl Hellmer
- Lucie Höflich
- Thomas Holtzmann
- Klaus Kammer
- Sebastian Koch
- Hermine Körner
- Hans Peter Korff
- Werner Krauss
- Regina Lemnitz
- Christiane Leuchtmann
- Wolfgang Liebeneiner
- Heinz Lieven
- Peter Lohmeyer
- Joseph Lorenz
- Erika Meingast
- Bernhard Minetti
- Sabine Orléans
- Götz Otto
- Christine Prober
- Will Quadflieg
- Carl Raddatz
- Peter Sattmann
- Ralf Schermuly
- Erich Schellow
- Walter Schmidinger
- Ernst Schröder
- Eva Katharina Schultz
- Sabine Sinjen
- Katharina Thalbach
- Heidemarie Theobald
- Peter Ustinov
- Elsa Wagner
- Antje Weisgerber

== Notable premieres ==
- Samuel Beckett: Warten auf Godot (1953, directed by Samuel Beckett)
- Max Frisch: Don Juan oder Die Liebe zur Geometrie (5 May 1953, simultaneously with the Schauspielhaus Zürich)
- Martin Walser: Eiche und Angora (23 September 1962)
- Peter Weiss: Die Verfolgung und Ermordung Jean Paul Marats (29 April 1964)
- Günter Grass: Die Plebejer proben den Aufstand (15 January 1966)
- Günter Grass: Davor (14 February 1969)
- Conor Cruise O'Brien: Mörderische Engel (10 January 1971)
- Thomas Bernhard: Einfach kompliziert (28 February 1986)
- Pavel Kohout: Patt (29 August 1987)
- Thomas Bernhard: Elisabeth II (5 November 1989)
- Volker Braun: Böhmen am Meer (11 March 1992)
- Edward Albee: "The Zoo Story" (1959)
