= Karlheinz Martin =

German director

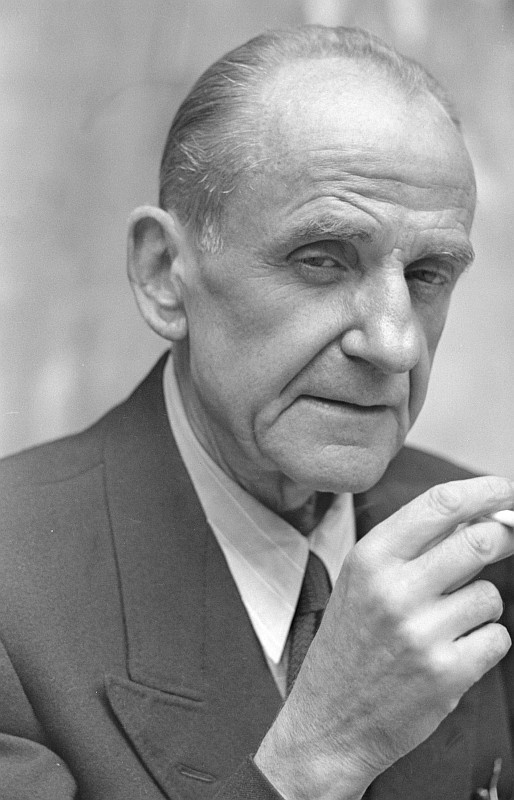
- Karlheinz Martin, 1945
- Born: May 6, 1886; Freiburg im Breisgau, Germany
- Died: January 13, 1948 (aged 61); Berlin, Germany

Karlheinz Martin (May 6, 1886 – January 13, 1948) was a German stage and film director, best known for his expressionist productions.

== Theatre ==
Karlheinz Martin began his theatrical career as an actor in Kassel in 1904. His next engagements were in Naumburg, Hanover, and Mannheim. He directed for the first time in 1909 at the summer theater in Bad Schandau. He then moved to Frankfurt am Main, where he managed the Komödienhaus (Comedy House) for three years. Afterward, he transferred to the Schauspielhaus (Playhouse) , where he became the driving artistic force in the following years. He directed Molière and Shakespeare cycles and, with productions such as his 1915 production of Bürger Schippel (by Carl Sternheim), helped stage Expressionism achieve its breakthrough.

In Berlin in 1919 he co-founded the avant-garde theater Die Tribüne, where he directed Ernst Toller's play Die Wandlung.

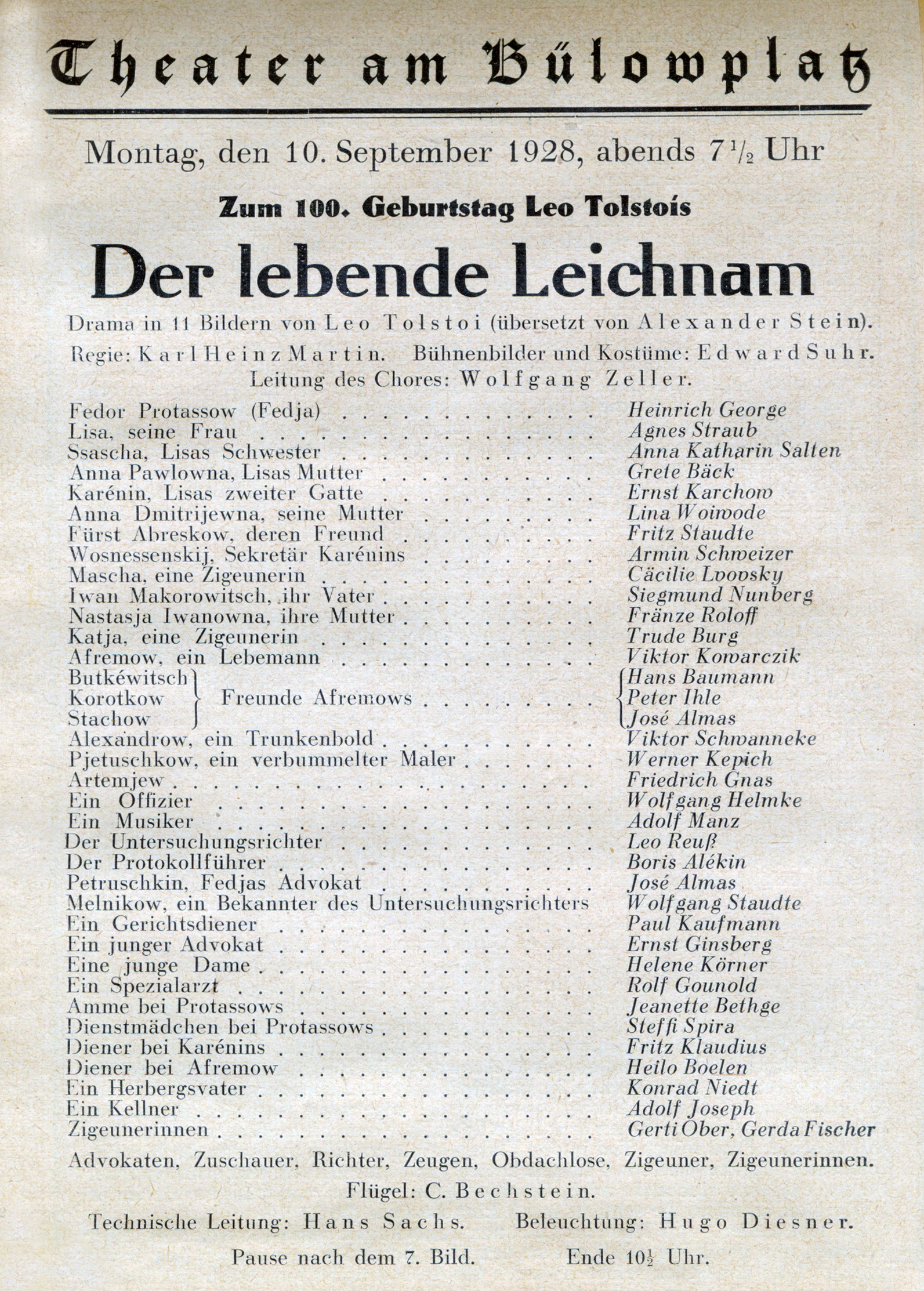
Martin as director (1928)

He also worked at the Kleines Schauspielhaus in Berlin, the Vienna Volkstheater and Raimundtheater, the Deutsches Künstlertheater Berlin, the Theater am Nollendorfplatz, the Berliner Volksbühne, where he was artistic director from 1929 to 1932, and the Kammerspiele of the Deutsches Theater, Berlin. Under the Nazi regime, Martin was banned from working as a theater director until 1940, so he turned more to film work. From 1940 onwards, he directed as a guest director at the Münchner Kammerspiele and the Berliner Schillertheater.

After the end of the Second World War, he made significant contributions to the reconstruction of the theater. On August 15, 1945, he reopened the Hebbel Theater in Berlin with Brecht's Threepenny Opera , followed by several world premieres: the German premiere of Friedrich Wolf's Professor Mamlock, the world premiere of Günther Weisenborn's Illegals, and the world premiere of Georg Kaiser's Soldier Tanaka. Martin, who also directed at the Renaissance Theater, led the Hebbel Theater until his death.

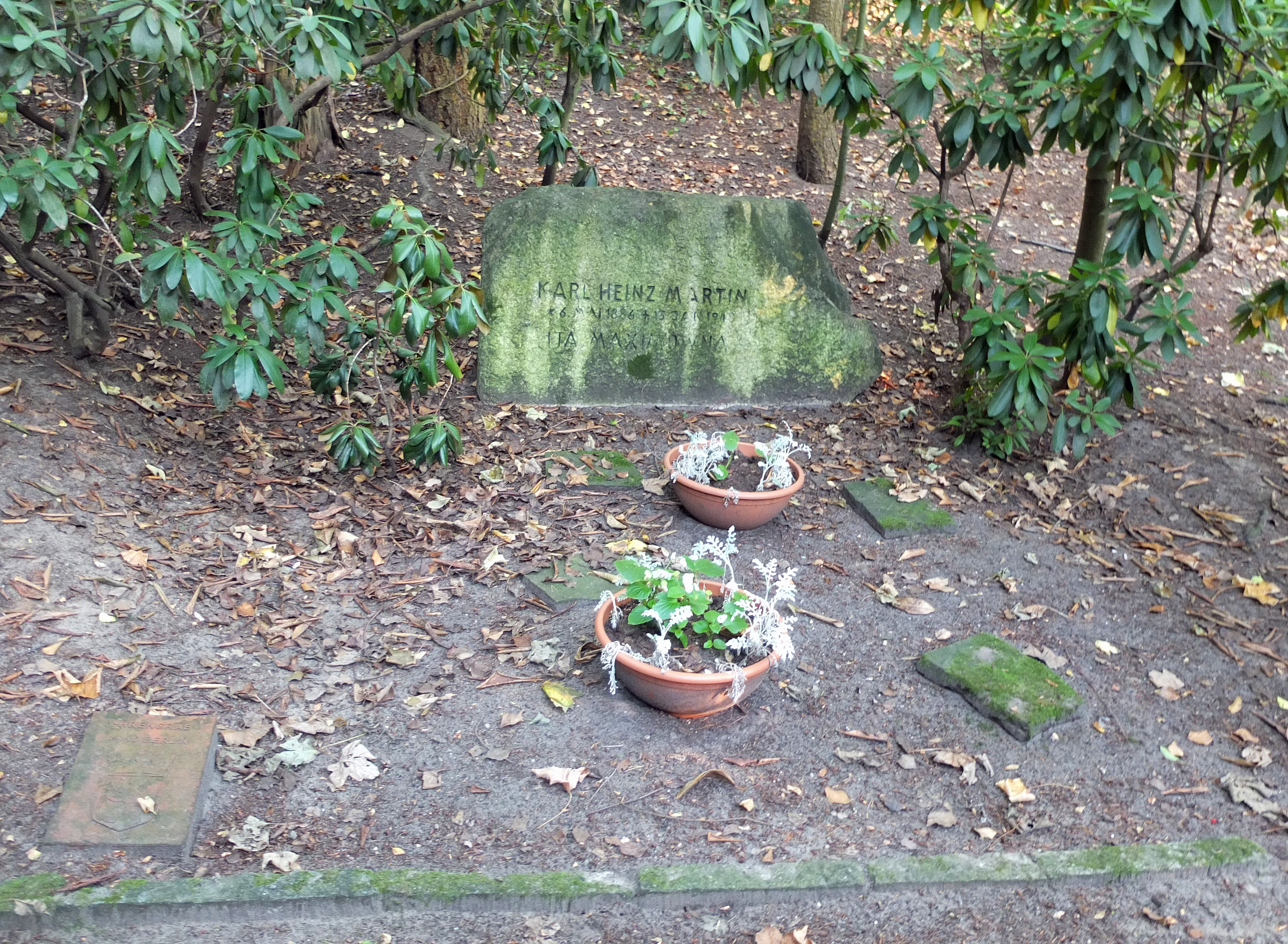
Grave in the Heerstraße cemetery in Berlin-Westend in 2016 (still with honorary grave marker)

Karlheinz Martin died in January 1948 at the age of 61 in the Auguste-Viktoria-Hospital in Berlin from pulmonary tuberculosis. He last lived at Gneiststraße 4 in Grunewald. His final resting place is a family plot in the state-owned Heerstraße Cemetery in Berlin-Westend. His partner, the stage and costume designer Ita Maximowna, was buried next to him in 1988. Karlheinz Martin's final resting place (grave location: II-Erb.-31) was designated an honorary grave of the State of Berlin from 1973 to 2021.

== Film ==
Martin also worked in film from 1919 onwards. His most significant contribution was the expressionist film From Morn to Midnight (1920), based on the play of the same name by Georg Kaiser . The sets are painted with distorted white lines, and the background is dominated by black walls. With the stylized actors performing in front of this backdrop, Martin created one of the purest works of expressionism in film. The film found no distributor at the time and was probably only shown in a few German cinemas. A copy of the film was later discovered in Japan.

In 1931, Martin co-wrote the screenplay for Phil Jutzi's Berlin – Alexanderplatz with Alfred Döblin . After 1933, he was only given sporadic opportunities to work in the theater, but he did direct some undemanding entertainment films.

During the Nazi regime, Karl-Heinz Martin enabled persecuted artists, such as the dancer and anti-fascist Jean Weidt, to escape from Germany. Weidt became the most successful dancer and choreographer of modern French dance in France. Because of his commitment to persecuted fellow artists, Martin was only given minor directing jobs by UFA .

Martin was first married to the actress Traute Carlsen. The actress Roma Bahn was his wife from 1916 to 1928. In 1929, he married Elisabeth Selmeczi, née Raab, in Berlin. The marriage ended in divorce in 1934. In the 1930s, Karlheinz Martin was briefly married to the Austrian actress Rose Stradner .

== Filmography ==
- From Morn to Midnight (1920) (also screenplay)
- The Transformation (1920)
- The House on the Moon (1921) (also screenplay)
- The Pearl of the Orient (1921) (also screenplay)
- Berlin-Alexanderplatz (1931) (Dialogue-Direction)
- La Paloma (1934)
- Love and the First Railway (1934)
- Punks Arrives from America (1935)
- Attack on Schweda (1935)
- The Adventurer of Paris (1936)
- You are my happiness (1936)
- Die glücklichste Ehe der Welt (1937)
- I would so love to be alone with you (Millionaires) (1937)
- Address Unknown (1937)
- The Voice of the Heart (1937)
- Concert in Tyrol (1938)
- The Jumping Jack (1938)
- Ursula Under Suspicion (1939)
