= List of West German films of 1963 =

List of films produced in West Germany in 1963

List of West German films of 1963. Feature films produced and distributed in West Germany in 1963.

== 1963 ==
Title	Director	Cast	Genre	Notes
An Alibi for Death	Alfred Vohrer	Ruth Leuwerik, Peter van Eyck, Charles Régnier, Sieghardt Rupp, Hannelore Elsner	Crime	Austrian-West German co-production
And So to Bed	Alfred Weidenmann	Lilli Palmer, Hildegard Knef, Nadja Tiller, Peter van Eyck, Paul Hubschmid, Martin Held, Daliah Lavi, Danielle Gaubert, Alexandra Stewart	Comedy	a.k.a. Das große Liebesspiel. West German-Austrian-French co-production
Apache Gold	Harald Reinl	Lex Barker, Pierre Brice, Mario Adorf, Marie Versini, Ralf Wolter	Western	a.k.a. Winnetou. Based on Karl May. West German-Yugoslav-French co-production
Apartmentzauber	Helmuth M. Backhaus	Rex Gildo, Heinz Erhardt	Comedy	a.k.a. Apartment-Zauber
Bekenntnisse eines möblierten Herrn	Franz Peter Wirth	Karl Michael Vogler, Alexandra Stewart, Cordula Trantow, Françoise Prévost, Maria Sebaldt	Comedy	a.k.a. Confessions of a Bachelor Lodger
The Black Abbot	Franz Josef Gottlieb	Joachim Fuchsberger, Grit Boettcher, Dieter Borsche, Charles Régnier, Klaus Kinski, Eddi Arent	Mystery thriller	Based on Edgar Wallace
The Black Panther of Ratana	Jürgen Roland	Marianne Koch, Heinz Drache, Horst Frank, Brad Harris, Chris Howland	Adventure	West German-Italian co-production
Breakfast in Bed	Axel von Ambesser	O. W. Fischer, Liselotte Pulver, Lex Barker	Comedy	
Captain Sindbad	Byron Haskin	Guy Williams, Pedro Armendáriz, Heidi Brühl	Adventure, Fantasy	American-West German co-production
The Curse of the Yellow Snake	Franz Josef Gottlieb	Joachim Fuchsberger, Brigitte Grothum, Pinkas Braun, Eddi Arent	Mystery thriller	Based on Edgar Wallace
Death Drums Along the River	Lawrence Huntington	Richard Todd, Marianne Koch, Vivi Bach, Albert Lieven, Walter Rilla, Simon Sabela	Adventure	Based on Edgar Wallace. British-West German-South African co-production
...denn die Musik und die Liebe in Tirol	Werner Jacobs	Vivi Bach, Claus Biederstaedt, Corny Collins, Gunther Philipp, Hubert von Meyerinck, Elke Sommer	Musical comedy	
Durchbruch Lok 234	Frank Wisbar	Erik Schumann, Maria Körber, Joseph Offenbach	Drama	a.k.a. The Breakthrough
Eleven Years and One Day	Gottfried Reinhardt	Ruth Leuwerik, Bernhard Wicki, Paul Hubschmid	Drama	
The Endless Night	Will Tremper	Harald Leipnitz, Hannelore Elsner, Alexandra Stewart, Werner Peters, Karin Hübner, Wolfgang Neuss, Mario Adorf	Drama	
Erotikon	Boštjan Hladnik	Ingrid van Bergen, Gunnar Möller, Michael Cramer, Fritz Rasp, Mathias Wieman	Drama	West German-Yugoslav co-production
Es war mir ein Vergnügen	Imo Moszkowicz	Esther Ofarim, Axel von Ambesser	Comedy	
Girl's Apartment	Michel Deville	Mylène Demongeot, Sylva Koscina, Renate Ewert	Comedy	French-Italian-West German co-production
The Golden Patsy	Rudolf Nussgruber, Peter Goldbaum	Gert Fröbe, Hilde Krahl, Joseph Offenbach, Wolfgang Kieling	Comedy	a.k.a. Heute kündigt mir mein Mann a.k.a. Mein Mann, der Goldesel
Gripsholm Castle	Kurt Hoffmann	Jana Brejchová, Walter Giller, Hanns Lothar, Nadja Tiller	Comedy	
The Hangman of London	Edwin Zbonek	Hansjörg Felmy, Maria Perschy, Chris Howland, Wolfgang Preiss, Dieter Borsche	Mystery thriller	a.k.a. The Mad Executioners a.k.a. Der Henker von London
A Holiday Like Never Before	Wolfgang Schleif	Eva Bartok, Carlos Thompson, Corny Collins	Comedy	
Homesick for St. Pauli	Werner Jacobs	Freddy Quinn, Jayne Mansfield	Musical	
The House in Montevideo	Helmut Käutner	Heinz Rühmann, Ruth Leuwerik	Comedy	
The Indian Scarf	Alfred Vohrer	Heinz Drache, Corny Collins, Elisabeth Flickenschildt, Klaus Kinski, Hans Clarin, Ady Berber, Siegfried Schürenberg, Eddi Arent	Mystery thriller	Based on Edgar Wallace
The Invisible Terror	Raphael Nussbaum	Hans von Borsody, Ellen Schwiers, Charles Régnier, Ivan Desny, Christiane Nielsen, Ilse Steppat, Herbert Fux	Thriller, Science fiction	a.k.a. Der Unsichtbare
Jack and Jenny	Victor Vicas	Senta Berger, Brett Halsey, Michael Hinz, Olga Chekhova, Ivan Desny	Romance	a.k.a. Early to Bed
Kali Yug: Goddess of Vengeance	Mario Camerini	Paul Guers, Senta Berger, Lex Barker, Claudine Auger, I. S. Johar, Klaus Kinski, Ian Hunter, Michael Medwin, Sergio Fantoni, Joachim Hansen	Adventure	Italian-French-West German co-production
The Lightship	Ladislao Vajda	James Robertson Justice, Helmut Wildt, Sieghardt Rupp, Michael Hinz, Dieter Borsche, Pinkas Braun, Werner Peters, Georg Lehn, Günter Mack, Wolfgang Völz	Thriller	
Love Has to Be Learned	Kurt Hoffmann	Martin Held, Barbara Rütting, Götz George	Comedy	
Machorka-Muff	Straub–Huillet	Erich Kuby	Short	
Man and Beast	Edwin Zbonek	Götz George, Günther Ungeheuer	War, Drama	West German-Yugoslav co-production. Entered into the 13th Berlin International Film Festival
Moral 63	Rolf Thiele	Nadja Tiller, Mario Adorf, Charles Régnier	Drama	
Murder in Rio	Horst Hächler	Erika Remberg, Hellmut Lange, Gustavo Rojo	Crime	West German-Brazilian co-production
My Daughter and I	Thomas Engel	Heinz Rühmann, Gustav Knuth, Gertraud Jesserer	Comedy	
The Mystery of the Indian Temple	Mario Camerini	Paul Guers, Senta Berger, Lex Barker, Claudine Auger, I. S. Johar, Klaus Kinski, Ian Hunter, Michael Medwin, Sergio Fantoni, Joachim Hansen	Adventure	Italian-French-West German co-production
Die Nacht am See	Werner Klingler, Peter M. Thouet	Christian Wolff, Christian Doermer, Rieke Ramoff, Hans Nielsen, Ernst Jacobi	Drama	Re-edited version of Painted Youth (1960, dir. Max Nosseck)
A Nearly Decent Girl	Ladislao Vajda	Liselotte Pulver, Martin Held	Comedy	West German-Spanish co-production
The Nylon Noose	Rudolf Zehetgruber	Dietmar Schönherr, Helga Sommerfeld, Laya Raki	Crime	
Ostrva	Jovan Živanović	Elke Sommer, Peter van Eyck	Drama	a.k.a. Seduction by the Sea. Yugoslav-West German co-production
Piccadilly Zero Hour 12	Rudolf Zehetgruber	Hanns Lothar, Helmut Wildt, Ann Smyrner, Pinkas Braun, Klaus Kinski	Mystery thriller	a.k.a. Step in the Dark a.k.a. The Pig-tail Murder
The Pirates of the Mississippi	Jürgen Roland	Hansjörg Felmy, Sabine Sinjen, Horst Frank, Brad Harris, Tony Kendall	Western	West German-Italian-French co-production
River of Evil	Helmuth M. Backhaus, Franz Eichhorn	Barbara Rütting, Harald Leipnitz, Oswaldo Loureiro, Tereza Rachel	Adventure	a.k.a. Und der Amazonas schweigt. West German-Brazilian co-production
Scotland Yard Hunts Dr. Mabuse	Paul May	Peter van Eyck, Werner Peters, Dieter Borsche, Klaus Kinski, Walter Rilla	Thriller	a.k.a. Scotland Yard vs. Dr Mabuse
The Secret of the Black Widow	Franz Josef Gottlieb	O. W. Fischer, Karin Dor, Klaus Kinski, Eddi Arent	Mystery thriller	West German-Spanish co-production
The Squeaker	Alfred Vohrer	Heinz Drache, Barbara Rütting, Klaus Kinski, Günter Pfitzmann, Eddi Arent, Siegfried Schürenberg	Mystery thriller	Based on Edgar Wallace
Stop Train 349	Rolf Hädrich	José Ferrer, Sean Flynn, Nicole Courcel, Jess Hahn, Hans-Joachim Schmiedel, Sieghardt Rupp, Christiane Schmidtmer, Arthur Brauss	Drama	a.k.a. Verspätung in Marienborn. West German-French-Italian co-production. Entered into the 13th Berlin International Film Festival
Storm Over Ceylon	Gerd Oswald	Lex Barker, Ann Smyrner, Maurice Ronet, Magali Noël	Adventure	West German-French-Italian co-production
The Strangler of Blackmoor Castle	Harald Reinl	Karin Dor, Harry Riebauer, Rudolf Fernau, Walter Giller	Mystery thriller	
The Threepenny Opera	Wolfgang Staudte	Curd Jürgens, Sammy Davis Jr., Hildegard Knef, Gert Fröbe, Lino Ventura	Musical	West German-French co-production
Tomfoolery in Zell am See	Franz Marischka	Adrian Hoven, Hannelore Elsner, Ingrid van Bergen	Comedy	
Les Tontons flingueurs	Georges Lautner	Lino Ventura, Bernard Blier, Jean Lefebvre, Francis Blanche, Sabine Sinjen, Horst Frank	Crime comedy	a.k.a. Crooks in Clover a.k.a. Monsieur Gangster; French-West German-Italian co-production
Venusberg	Rolf Thiele	Marisa Mell, Ina Duscha	Comedy	
The White Spider	Harald Reinl	Joachim Fuchsberger, Karin Dor, Horst Frank, Chris Howland	Mystery thriller	
Zwei Whisky und ein Sofa	Günter Gräwert	Maria Schell, Karl Michael Vogler, Nadia Gray, Robert Graf	Comedy	a.k.a. Whiskey and Sofa

== Documentaries and television films ==
Title	Director	Cast	Genre	Notes
12 Angry Men	Günter Gräwert	Robert Graf, Siegfried Lowitz, Mario Adorf, Walter Rilla, Ernst Fritz Fürbringer, Ralf Wolter	Drama	a.k.a. Twelve Angry Men a.k.a. The Twelve Jurors a.k.a. The 12 Jurors
Die Abrechnung	Fritz Umgelter	Wolfgang Büttner	Drama	
Die achte Runde	Eberhard Itzenplitz	William Ray, Harry Riebauer, Eva Pflug, Vickie Henderson, Otto Waldis	Drama, Sport	a.k.a. Die 8. Runde
Am Herzen kann man sich nicht kratzen	Gustav Burmester	Hanns Ernst Jäger, Hermann Schomberg, Veronika Bayer	Comedy	
Amphitryon 38	Dietrich Haugk	Hannes Messemer, Ingrid Andree, Peer Schmidt	Comedy	
Antony and Cleopatra	Rainer Wolffhardt	Lola Müthel, Peter Pasetti, Gerd Baltus, Carl Lange	Drama	a.k.a. Antonius und Cleopatra
The Battle of the Butterflies	Hans Dieter Schwarze	Karin Heym, Klaus Schwarzkopf, Claus Biederstaedt, Irene Marhold, Fita Benkhoff	Comedy	a.k.a. Die Schmetterlingsschlacht
Beatrice und Juana	Gerhard Klingenberg	Michael Degen, Margot Philipp, Luitgard Im	Comedy, Fantasy	
Besuch am Nachmittag	Hansgünther Heyme	Günter Mack, Gisela Trowe, Hans Walter Clasen, Annie Rosar	Drama	
Bezauberndes Fräulein	Paul Martin	Georg Thomalla, Monika Dahlberg	Musical	
Bilderkomödie	Peter Beauvais	Joachim Wichmann, Ilsemarie Schnering	Comedy	a.k.a. Prenez garde à la peinture a.k.a. The Late Christopher Bean
The Black Forest Girl	Wilm ten Haaf	Margitta Scherr, Bert Fortell, Willy Reichert, Lotte Ledl	Musical	
Captain Karagöz	Harald Benesch	Hermann Schomberg, Ernst Jacobi, Karl Paryla	Comedy	a.k.a. Kapitän Karagöz a.k.a. Capitaine Karagheuz
Charley's Aunt	Wolfgang Liebeneiner	Boy Gobert	Comedy	
Clothes Make the Man	Paul Verhoeven	Hanns Lothar, Monika Peitsch	Comedy	
Dame Kobold	Detlof Krüger	Anaid Iplicjian, Günther Schramm	Comedy	a.k.a. The Phantom Lady a.k.a. La dama duende
Danton's Death	Fritz Umgelter	Wolfgang Reichmann, Wolfgang Büttner, Wolfgang Kieling	Drama	
Darkness at Noon	Ettore Cella	Heinz Joachim Klein, Ruth Maria Kubitschek, Fritz Wepper, Peter Kuiper, Hans Helmut Dickow, Gunther Malzacher, Walter Ladengast	Drama	a.k.a. Sonnenfinsternis
Death of a Salesman	Michael Kehlmann	Leopold Rudolf, Klausjürgen Wussow, Horst Frank	Drama	
Den Tod in der Hand	Fritz Umgelter	Wolfgang Reichmann, Karl Walter Diess	Thriller	
Detective Story	Theo Mezger	Hans Christian Blech, Karl John, Heidelinde Weis, Bruno Dietrich, Heinz Bennent	Crime drama	
The Doctor's Dilemma	Kurt Wilhelm	Anton Walbrook, Christoph Bantzer, Gerlinde Locker, Karl Paryla	Drama	
Dr. Joanna Marlowe	Wilm ten Haaf	Margot Trooger, Gisela Uhlen, Horst Tappert, Walter Rilla	Drama	
Don Carlos	Franz Peter Wirth	Helmut Griem, Ernst Fritz Fürbringer, Karl Michael Vogler	Drama	
Don Juan Comes Back from the War	Kurt Wilhelm	Brigitte Skay, Renate Kasché, Nicole Heesters, Maria Emo, Lotte Ledl, Klaramaria Skala, Ljuba Welitsch, Jane Tilden, Ida Ehre, Christl Mardayn, Sieghardt Rupp	Drama	a.k.a. Don Juan kommt zurück
Dumala	Walter Rilla	Margot Trooger, Albert Lieven, Rudolf Fernau, Heinz Weiss, Hans Clarin	Drama	a.k.a. The Man of God
The Dumb Waiter	Wolf Vollmar	Ernst Jacobi, Werner Schumacher	Crime	a.k.a. Der stumme Diener
Das Echo	Ottokar Runze	Brigitte Grothum, Helmut Förnbacher, Benno Hoffmann	Fantasy	
Die Entscheidung	Rainer Wolffhardt	Paul Dahlke, Rosemarie Fendel, Käthe Haack, Herbert Fleischmann	Drama	
Er soll dein Herr sein	Georg Marischka	Johannes Heesters, Hertha Feiler	Comedy	
The Father	Wilhelm Semmelroth	Paul Dahlke, Brigitte Skay, Ruth Hausmeister	Drama	a.k.a. Der Vater
The Fourposter	Hans Quest	Ingrid Andree, Hanns Lothar	Comedy	
Fräulein, schreiben sie!	Erik Ode	Harald Juhnke, Chariklia Baxevanos	Comedy	a.k.a. Youth at the Helm
Freundschaftsspiel	Fritz Umgelter	Hanns Lothar, Heinz Weiss, Erwin Strahl	Drama	
The Front Page	Michael Kehlmann	Hannes Messemer, Hans Dieter Zeidler	Comedy	a.k.a. Reporter
The Gamblers	Walter Henn	Hans Korte, Hans Helmut Dickow, Joachim Teege, Konrad Georg, Max Haufler	Drama	a.k.a. Die Spieler
Geliebt in Rom	Paul Verhoeven	Ingrid Andree, Robert Graf, Michael Hinz	War, Drama	a.k.a. Loved in Rome
Glashauskomödie	Heinz Dunkhase	Luise Ullrich, Richard Häussler, Hans Clarin, Volker Lechtenbrink	Comedy	
Das Glück läuft hinterher	Peter Beauvais	Katrin Schaake, Dirk Dautzenberg, Werner Bruhns, Wera Frydtberg, Walter Jokisch, Helmut Förnbacher, Gert Haucke	Comedy	
Glückliche Reise	Thomas Engel	Hans von Borsody, Christine Görner, Gunnar Möller	Musical comedy	a.k.a. Bon Voyage
Goodbye, My Fancy	Raoul Wolfgang Schnell	Irmgard Först, Hellmut Lange, Wolfgang Preiss, Sabine Eggerth	Comedy	a.k.a. Leb wohl, mein Traum
Das große Vorbild	William Dieterle	Ruth Hausmeister, Wolfgang Büttner, Christian Doermer	Crime drama	
Die Grotte	Michael Kehlmann	Carl-Heinz Schroth, Berta Drews, Ida Krottendorf, Reinhard Kolldehoff, Achim Benning, Ernst Stankovski	Drama	a.k.a. La Grotte
Der grüne Kakadu	Michael Kehlmann	Marisa Mell, Louise Martini, Hans Dieter Zeidler, Manfred Inger	Drama	
Hasenklein kann nichts dafür	Rolf von Sydow	Willy Reichert, Sabine Eggerth, Gunnar Möller	Comedy	
Haus der Schönheit	Eugen York	Maria Sebaldt, Fita Benkhoff, Alexander Kerst	Musical	
Hedda Gabler	Paul Hoffmann	Ruth Leuwerik, Wolfgang Kieling, Martin Benrath	Drama	
Herzog Blaubarts Burg	Michael Powell	Norman Foster	Opera	a.k.a. Bluebeard's Castle
Honours for Sale	Rainer Erler	Carl-Heinz Schroth	Crime comedy	a.k.a. Medals for the Boys a.k.a. Orden für die Wunderkinder
Im Schatten des Krieges	Edward Rothe	Dietmar Schönherr	War	a.k.a. In the Shadow of War a.k.a. Bomber's Moon
In einer fremden Stadt	Joachim Hess	Margot Trooger, Carl Lange	Drama	
In Sachen Hinkelmann	Dieter Lemmel	Heinz Schubert, Günther Ungeheuer	Drama	
Der jähzornige junge Mann	Rainer Erler	Hans Clarin	Comedy	a.k.a. From the Diary of a Violent-Tempered Man
Kean	Gerhard Klingenberg	Karl Paryla, Brigitte Grothum, Judith Holzmeister	Drama	
Der Klassenaufsatz	Harald Benesch	Karl-Georg Saebisch, Paul Edwin Roth, Ruth Maria Kubitschek, Carl Lange	Drama, War	
The Legend of the Holy Drinker	Franz Josef Wild	Hannes Messemer	Drama	
Leutnant Gustl	John Olden	Peter Weck, Hans Moser, Kurt Meisel, Ernst Stankovski, Christiane Hörbiger, Ewald Balser	Drama	a.k.a. None but the Brave. Austrian-West German co-production
Life Is a Dream	Ulrich Erfurth	Thomas Holtzmann, Carl Lange, Krista Keller	Drama	a.k.a. Das Leben ein Traum
The Long and the Short and the Tall	Tom Toelle	Helmut Förnbacher, Hartmut Reck, Horst Niendorf, Peer Schmidt, Kenji Takaki	War	a.k.a. Das Ende vom Lied
Der Mann aus England	Gerhard Klingenberg	Alexander Kerst, Paul Edwin Roth, Agnes Fink	Drama	
Maria Magdalena	Rudolf Noelte	Cordula Trantow, Helmut Griem, Uwe Friedrichsen, Walter Richter	Drama	
Mary Stuart	Hans Lietzau	Elfriede Kuzmany, Agnes Fink, Hans Söhnker, Klausjürgen Wussow, Hans Christian Blech, Fritz Rasp	Drama	a.k.a. Maria Stuart
Mauern	Egon Monk	Siegfried Wischnewski, Ernst Jacobi, Hartmut Reck, Camilla Spira	Drama	
Mein Bruder Alf	Edward Rothe	Paul Dahlke, Bruno Dietrich, Rolf Becker, Marlene Warrlich	Drama	
Mein Freund Jack	Hans Hollmann	Ernst Stankovski, Vera Tschechowa	Comedy	a.k.a. Jack Straw
Mein Leopold	Hans Heinrich	Franz Nicklisch, Christian Wolff	Drama	
Mirandolina	Dietrich Haugk	Johanna von Koczian, Wolfgang Kieling	Comedy	a.k.a. The Mistress of the Inn
The Moon Birds	Peter Zadek	Klaus Kinski, Ilse Pagé, Grethe Weiser, Gisela Trowe	Fantasy	
The Muzzle	Hans Quest	Werner Hinz, Heinz Bennent	Comedy	a.k.a. Der Maulkorb
My Heart's in the Highlands	Ludwig Cremer	Peer Schmidt, Manfred Kunst, Hans Mahnke	Drama	
A Night Out	Rudolph Cartier	Fritz Wepper	Drama	a.k.a. Eine Nacht außer Haus
Not in the Book	Heinz Wilhelm Schwarz	Günther Lüders, Heli Finkenzeller, Peter Schütte	Crime comedy	a.k.a. Schönes Weekend, Mr. Bennett
Outward Bound	Walter Rilla	Paula Wessely, Hartmut Reck, Walter Rilla, Lukas Ammann	Drama	a.k.a. Überfahrt
Der Parasit	Hans-Christof Stenzel	Paul Edwin Roth, Hans Nielsen, Marion Michael	Comedy	
Die Party	Edward Rothe	Karin Heym, Peter Lühr	Drama	
Plüsch, Plissees und Pleureusen	Peter Hamel	Christiane Maybach, Bruni Löbel, Harry Hardt, Walter Rilla, Harry Wüstenhagen	Musical comedy	
Policy for Murder	Karl Fruchtmann	Eva Pflug, Jürgen Goslar	Thriller	a.k.a. Someone to Kill a.k.a. Ein Todesfall wird vorbereitet
Poor Bitos	Peter Beauvais	Joachim Teege, Klausjürgen Wussow, Siegfried Wischnewski, Alexander Kerst	Comedy	a.k.a. Der arme Bitos... oder Das Diner der Köpfe
Port Royal	Peter Beauvais	Cordula Trantow, Paula Wessely, Romuald Pekny	Drama	
The Priest's Tale of the Righted Cross	Tom Toelle	Martin Berliner, Hans Putz, Klaus Löwitsch, Guido Wieland	Drama, War	a.k.a. Die wahre Geschichte vom geschändeten und wiederhergestellten Kreuz
The Private Secretary	Franz Josef Wild	Helmuth Lohner, Karin Baal, Gustav Knuth	Comedy	
The Rehearsal	Rainer Wolffhardt	Heidelinde Weis, Peter Pasetti, Herbert Fleischmann	Drama	a.k.a. Die Probe oder Die bestrafte Liebe
Reunion Day	Peter Beauvais	Klausjürgen Wussow, Dirk Dautzenberg, Paul Edwin Roth, Herbert Stass, Irmgard Först	Drama	a.k.a. Jahre danach
The Sacco-Vanzetti Story	Edward Rothe	Robert Freitag, Günther Neutze	Crime, Docudrama	a.k.a. Der Fall Sacco und Vanzetti
Schlachtvieh	Egon Monk	Ingmar Zeisberg, Ernst Jacobi, Uwe Friedrichsen, Bruno Dietrich, Hartmut Reck, Gert Haucke	Drama	a.k.a. Lambs to the Slaughter
Eine schöne Bescherung	Klaus Wagner	Gustav Knuth, Heli Finkenzeller, Max Haufler	Black comedy	a.k.a. My Three Angels a.k.a. We're No Angels
Schule der Geläufigkeit	Peter Lilienthal	Max Haufler, Ursula Diestel, Heinz Schubert, Peter Mosbacher	Comedy	
Die Schwiegerväter	Hans Dieter Schwarze	Claus Biederstaedt	Comedy	a.k.a. A Curious Accident
The Seagull	Wolfgang Glück	Brigitte Horney, Helmuth Lohner, Ida Krottendorf, Erich Schellow	Drama	a.k.a. Die Möwe; West German-Austrian co-production
Sein Meisterstück	Thomas Engel	Rudolf Platte, Grethe Weiser	Comedy	a.k.a. Savez-vous planter les choux?
Sonderurlaub	Rainer Erler	Fritz Wepper	Drama	
Sound Alibi	Dieter Lemmel	Heinz Schubert	Crime	a.k.a. Vorsätzlich
Spiel im Morgengrauen	Ludwig Cremer	Bert Fortell, Louise Martini, Kurt Meisel, Bruno Hübner	Drama	a.k.a. Night Games a.k.a. Daybreak
Stadtpark	Klaus Wagner	Inge Meysel, Karin Heym, Michael Hinz	Drama	
Stalingrad	Gustav Burmester	Hanns Lothar, Christoph Bantzer, Ullrich Haupt, Wolfgang Büttner, Hans Paetsch, Wolfgang Völz	War	
The State of Siege	Fritz Umgelter	Wolfgang Kieling, Hilde Krahl, Richard Münch, Hellmut Lange, Ernst Fritz Fürbringer, Carl Lange, Heinz Weiss	Drama	a.k.a. Der Belagerungszustand
Talents and Admirers	Hans Dieter Schwarze	Cordula Trantow, Blandine Ebinger, Hanne Wieder, Werner Finck	Comedy	
Die Teilnahme	Peter Beauvais	Andrea Dahmen, Marianne Hoppe, Hans Unterkircher, Peter Capell, Dirk Dautzenberg, Wolfried Lier, Hannelore Elsner	Drama	a.k.a. La sua parte di storia
Das tödliche Patent	Georg Marischka	Wolfgang Preiss, Siegfried Lowitz, Horst Tappert, Ingeborg Schöner	Crime	a.k.a. A Clean Kill
Traveller Without Luggage	Ludwig Cremer	Robert Graf, Gertrud Kückelmann, Lil Dagover, Sascha Hehn	Drama	a.k.a. Reisender ohne Gepäck
Twelfth Night	Franz Peter Wirth	Karl Michael Vogler, Ingrid Andree, Hanns Lothar, Heidelinde Weis, Paul Verhoeven, Fritz Wepper	Comedy	
Um acht Uhr kommt Sadowski	Hermann Wenninger	Paul Dahlke, Fritz Wepper	Drama	a.k.a. Um 8 Uhr kommt Sadowski
Umbruch	Konrad Wagner	Krista Keller, René Deltgen	Drama	a.k.a. The Iron Maiden
Das Unbrauchbare an Anna Winters	Eberhard Schröder	Edith Schultze-Westrum	Cold War spy film, Drama	
Under the Pear Tree	Gerhard Klingenberg	Heinz Reincke, Eva Lissa, Paul Klinger, Tilla Durieux	Crime drama	a.k.a. Unterm Birnbaum
Ein ungebetener Gast	Johannes Schaaf	Wolfgang Kieling, Konrad Georg	Thriller	a.k.a. The Lonesome Road
Vassa Zheleznova	Egon Monk	Therese Giehse, Ingmar Zeisberg	Drama	
Verlorner Sohn	Ludwig Cremer	Richard Münch, Christoph Bantzer, Ulli Philipp, Gisela Uhlen, Benno Sterzenbach	Drama	a.k.a. The Prodigal
Waiting for Godot	Rolf Hädrich	Heinz Reincke, Kurt Sowinetz	Drama	
Der Wald	Michael Kehlmann	Hilde Hildebrand, Helmut Förnbacher, Karl-Otto Alberty	Comedy	a.k.a. The Forest
The Wicked Scheme of Jebal Deeks	Dietrich Haugk	Carl-Heinz Schroth, Hubert von Meyerinck	Comedy	a.k.a. Die Rache des Jebal Deeks
Willy	Allan A. Buckhantz	Hubert Persicke, Hannelore Schroth, Edith Schultze-Westrum, Reinhard Kolldehoff	Drama	a.k.a. Die erste Lehre
Die Wölfe	Falk Harnack	Thomas Holtzmann, Max Haufler	Drama	a.k.a. Les Loups
Das Wunder des San Gennaro	Sam Besekow	Willy Trenk-Trebitsch, Paul Edwin Roth, Manfred Inger	Drama	
Die Zaubergeige	Wolfgang Liebeneiner	Raymond Wolansky, Edith Mathis, Benno Kusche, Gottlob Frick, Hans Herbert Fiedler	Opera	

== See also ==
- List of Austrian films of 1963
- List of East German films of 1963

== Bibliography ==
- Bergfelder, Tim. International Adventures: German Popular Cinema and European Co-Productions in the 1960s. Berghahn Books, 2005.
