= The Rats (play) =

The Rats is a stage drama in five acts by German dramatist Gerhart Hauptmann, which premiered in 1911, one year before the author received the Nobel Prize for Literature. Unlike other Hauptmann plays, such as The Weavers (1892) and The Assumption of Hannele (1893), this one does not seem ever to have been performed on Broadway.

== Characters ==
- Harro Hassenreuter, former theatrical manager
- Mrs. Harro Hassenreuter
- Walpurga, their daughter
- Pastor Spitta
- Erich Spitta, postulant for holy orders, his son
- Alice Ruetterbusch, actress
- Nathanael Jettel, court actor
- Kaeferstein, Dr. Kegel, pupils of Hassenreuter
- John, foreman mason
- Mrs. John, charwoman to Hassenreuter
- Bruno Mechelke, her brother
- Pauline Pipercarcka, a servant girl
- Mrs. Sidonie Knobbe
- Selma, her daughter
- Quaquaro, house-steward
- Mrs. Kielbacke
- Policeman Schierke
- Two infants

== Summary ==
Setting: Berlin, late 19th or early 20th century.

Mrs Jette John, housekeeper to Harro Hassenreuter, an ex-theatre manager, scolds the pregnant but unmarried Pauline for wanting to return to a worthless lover intending to forget about her. Childless after having lost Adelbert, her own baby, three years ago, Jette proposes to take care of it herself despite being forced to live under conditions of "mildew an' insec'-powder". To help Jette out, Harro brings her a milk-boiler. After the baby's birth, Jette notices that the boy's hair is of the same color and shade as Adelbert's and so she gives him the same name and designs to keep the boy as her own. When Pauline returns to find out how her baby is, Jette slaps her hard on the ear. Regretting that gesture, she slaps her own face. But when Pauline asks to see the baby a second time, she casts looks of hatred at her. Pressured by her landlady who knows about the birth, Pauline informed the registrar's office about it and now a man from the guardian office will come over.

Harro's daughter, Walpurga loves her tutor, Erich Spitta, who has ambitions of becoming an actor and a dramatist. Unaware of her attachment, Harro gives him acting lessons along with two other pupils in Schiller's The Bride of Messina. Harro quarrels with Erich concerning forms of dramatic art, the former favoring Schiller, the latter Lessing. "You are a rat, so to speak", Hassenreuter asserts. "One of those rats who are beginning, in the field of politics, to undermine our glorious and recently united German Empire. They are trying to cheat us of the reward of our labors. And in the garden of German art these rats are gnawing at the roots of the tree of idealism." In his son's room, Pastor Spitta discovers a photograph of Walpurga and, not knowing she is his daughter, shows it to Harro. As a result, Harro warns his daughter to reject Erich, or else he will repudiate her.

To keep Adelbert as her own, Jette steals a baby from Sidonie, an alcohol and morphine addict who has difficulties in taking care of it, and substitutes it in Adelbert's place while fleeing with Pauline's baby. Pauline returns and tells Harro that Jette has her baby, judged by the authorities to be neglected. A little later, Sidonie alerts the entire tenement by confusedly asserting her own baby was stolen. Pauline denies this, thinking it is her own. When Hassenreuter looks down at it, the baby is found to be dead. Jette convinces her husband, Paul, that she has given birth while he was out of town at work as a foreman-mason and has taken the baby to his married sister's home in the country. A friend of his, Emil Quaquaro, informs him about the death of Sidonie's baby, along with the doings of Bruno, her brother. "They knows at the police station that Bruno was seen in company o' the Polish girl what wanted to claim this here child, first right outside o' the door here an' then at a certain place on Shore street where the tanners sometimes looses their soakin' hides," he reveals. "An' now the girl's jus' disappeared. I don' know nothin' o' the particulars, excep' that the police is huntin' for the girl." Meanwhile, Erich quarrels with his father about Walperga and they part company. When Erich encounters Jette, she expresses herself incoherently. When the bewildered Erich leaves, Jette and Paul are visited by Bruno. Paul loads his revolver as a warning never to come back and then leaves. To Jette's dismay, Bruno reveals that, instead of scaring her off as planned, he has murdered Pauline. She refused to yield her baby. "An' all of a sudden she went for my throat that I thought it'd be the end o' me then an' there," he says. "Like a dawg she went for me hot an' heavy! An' then ... then I got a little bit excited too- an' then, well ... that's how it come ..."

Knowing that Erich and Walpurga love each other, Teresa, Harro's wife, tries to intervene on their behalf before her husband. Just appointed as manager of a theatre, he promises to express a more lenient view of the matter. He reveals to Jette that Sidonie's baby is dead, as well as the news that police officers have discovered that she never went with the boy to her husband's sister, having been seen by the park near the river.

Paul is tired of living in a rat-infested house and decides to bring the baby over to his sister, but Jette reveals that the child is not his. Sidonie's daughter, Selma, arrives and informs them that the police have concluded that she brought down Pauline's baby from Harro's loft to her. Piece by piece, Paul discovers the truth about his wife's scheming. In a fit of rage and despair, Jette takes hold of the baby, but is prevented from leaving with him. She blindly rushes out and before anyone can prevent it, she kills herself in the middle of the street.

== Film adaptations ==
Five German films based on the Hauptmann play, all entitled "Die Ratten":

- A 1921 film The Rats, directed by Hanns Kobe with Eugen Klöpfer, Blandine Ebinger, Gertrude W. Hoffmann, and Lucie Höflich.
- A 1955 film Die Ratten, directed by Robert Siodmak, with Maria Schell, Curd Jürgens, and Heidemarie Hatheyer.
- A 1959 TV film, directed by John Olden, with Ingrid Andree, Walter Richter, Peter Mosbacher, and Elisabeth Flickenschildt
- A 1969 TV film The Rats, directed by Peter Beauvais, with Sabine Sinjen, Inge Meysel, Reinhard Kolldehoff, and Uwe Friedrichsen
- A 1977 TV film, directed by Rudolf Noelte, with Cordula Trantow, Günter Lamprecht, and Gottfried John.
