= Christoph Maria Herbst =

German actor and comedian (born 1966)

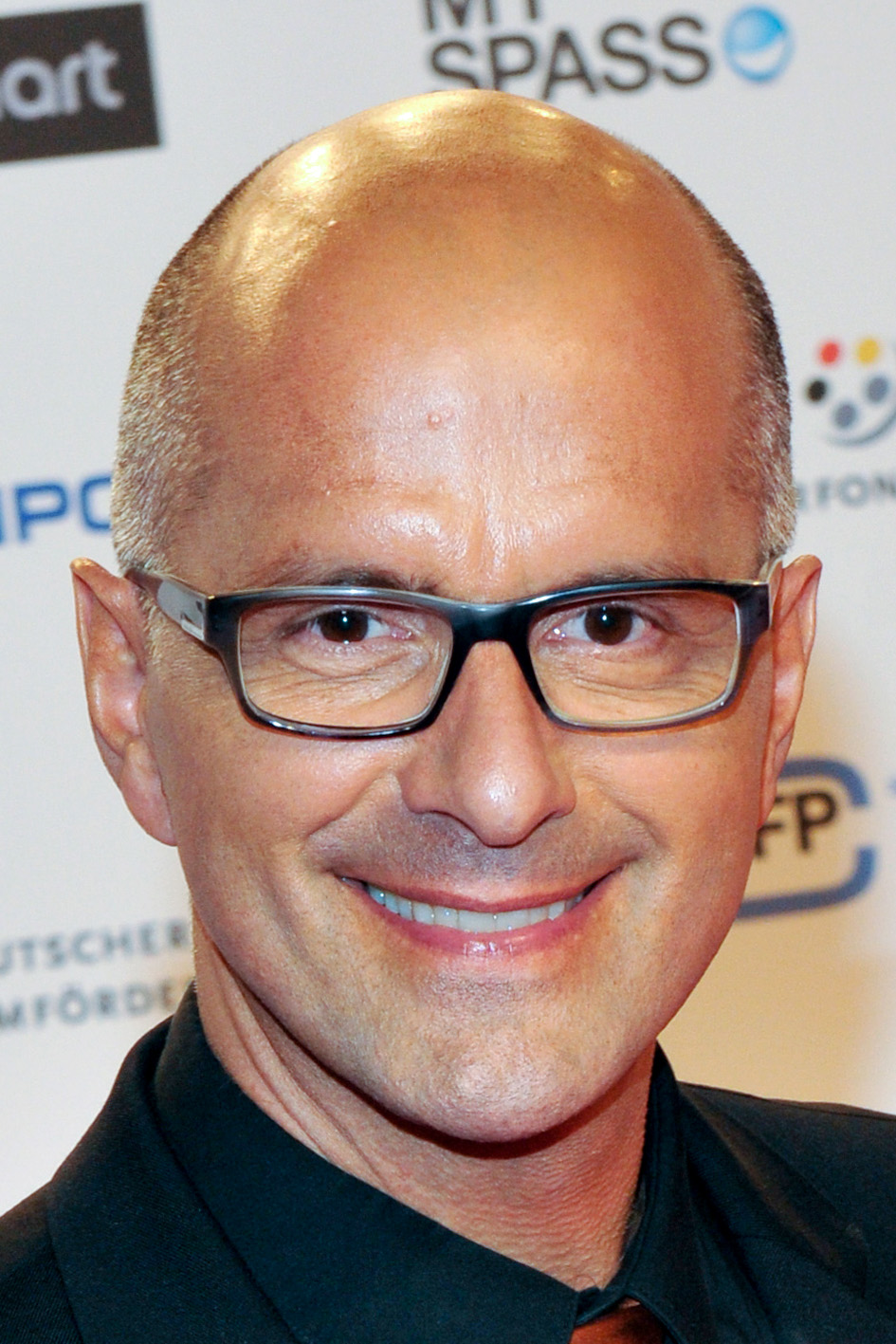
- Herbst in 2014
- Born: 9 February 1966 (age 60); Wuppertal, West Germany
- Occupations: Actor, comedian, voice actor
- Years active: 1989–present

Christoph Maria Herbst (born 9 February 1966) is a German actor and comedian.

== Early life ==
Herbst was born in Wuppertal. After passing the Abitur, he became a trainee banker and was active at the free theatre scene in Wuppertal at the same time.

== Career ==
=== Theatre ===
In 1986, Herbst was a founding member of the private Theater in Cronenberg and its acting school. He's still performing in German theatres. Most recently, he performed "Männerhort" (Men nursery) at the Theater am Kurfürstendamm in Berlin together with Bastian Pastewka, Michael Kessler and Jürgen Tonkel. He is married to Gisi Herbst.

=== Television ===
Herbst made his first appearance in German television in the show Sketchup – The Next Generation in 1997. From 2002 to 2004, he performed as a supporting actor in Ladykracher. In 2004, he had his first leading role in the ProSieben series Stromberg. In October 2006, the work on the third season of Stromberg began, airing in early 2007. Herbst also appeared in Sesamstraße in 2006, and in Anke Engelke's show Ladyland. In 2007, his seven-piece series Hilfe! Hochzeit! – Die schlimmste Woche meines Lebens, an adaptation of the British series The Worst Week of My Life, was broadcast.

=== Film ===
Herbst's movie career began in 1998 in the film Der wirklich letzte Junggeselle ("The last bachelor"). His star roles were together with Michael "Bully" Herbig, Rick Kavanian and Christian Tramitz in Traumschiff Surprise – Periode 1 in 2004, as well as his appearance as the butler Alfons Hatler in the 2004 movie Der Wixxer together with Oliver Kalkofe, Thomas Fritsch, Oliver Welke and other leading German comedians. In 2006, Herbst teamed up again with Herbig in the movie Hui Buh: The Goofy Ghost, starring as King Julius, the 111th. His more prominent role was in the movie Look Who's Back as Christoph Sensenbrink.

== Filmography ==
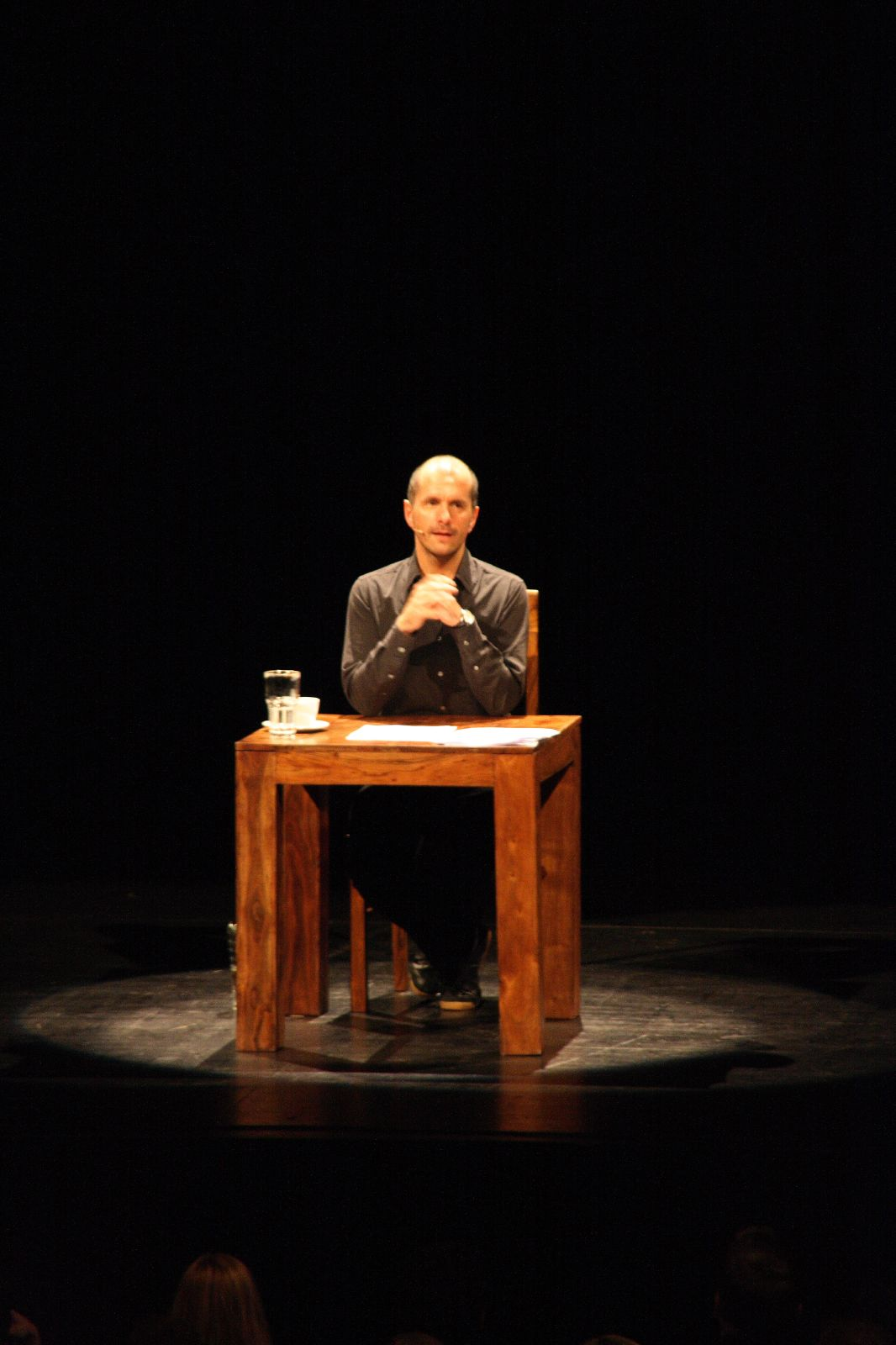
Herbst in 2007

- 1998: Der wirklich letzte Junggeselle
- 2004: Der Wixxer
- 2004: Traumschiff Surprise – Periode 1
- 2004: Stromberg Season 1 (TV series)
- 2004: Room Service
- 2004: A Pass from the Back
- 2005: Erkan & Stefan in Der Tod kommt krass
- 2005: Stromberg Season 2 (TV series)
- 2005: The Fisherman and His Wife
- 2006: Hui Buh: The Goofy Ghost
- 2006: Pastewka (TV series)
- 2006: Wo ist Fred!?
- 2006: Impy's Island (voice)
- 2007: Stromberg Season 3 (TV series)
- 2007: Cutting Edge
- 2007: Neues vom Wixxer
- 2007: Hilfe! Hochzeit! – Die schlimmste Woche meines Lebens (TV series)
- 2007: Hands off Mississippi
- 2007: Tramitz & Friends (TV series)
- 2007: Jakobs Bruder
- 2008: Mord mit Aussicht (TV series)
- 2008: Don Quixote (TV movie)
- 2008: Urmel voll in Fahrt (voice)
- 2008: Zwei Weihnachtsmänner
- 2009: Stromberg Season 4 (TV series)
- 2009: Vicky the Viking
- 2010: Kreutzer kommt
- 2011: Vicky and the Treasure of the Gods
- 2012: Und weg bist du (2012, TV movie)
- 2013: 300 Worte Deutsch
- 2014: Stromberg – The Movie
- 2014: The Man Cave
- 2015: 3 Türken und ein Baby
- 2015: Mara and the Firebringer
- 2015: The Two Twins (TV movie)
- 2015: The Small and the Wicked
- 2015: Highway To Hellas
- 2015: Look Who's Back
- 2018: Little Miss Dolittle
- 2018: How About Adolf?
- 2021: Contra
- 2022: Family Affairs
- 2023: Ein Fest fürs Leben
- 2026: Extrawurst

== Awards ==
- 2002: Deutscher Comedypreis as Best Supporting Actor in Ladykracher
- 2005: Bayerischer Fernsehpreis for Stromberg
- 2005: Deutscher Comedypreis as Best Actor for Stromberg
- 2005: Goldener Gong for Stromberg
- 2005: Jupiter-Filmpreis as Best TV Actor
- 2006: Adolf-Grimme-Preis for Stromberg
- 2006: Deutscher Comedypreis as Best Actor in a Comedy series for Stromberg
- 2006: GQ – Man of the year in the category TV
- 2006: Sony Music – Triple-Platinum for over 150,000 sold Stromberg DVDs
- 2007: Deutscher Comedypreis as Best Actor (in a Comedy series) for Stromberg
- 2026: Karl Valentin Order
