= Charlie Muffin (novel) =

1977 spy thriller novel by Brian Freemantle

- First edition (publ. Jonathan Cape)
- Author: Brian Freemantle
- Publisher: Jonathan Cape
- Publication date: January 1, 1977
- ISBN: 978-0-224-01312-3
- Followed by: Clap Hands, Here Comes Charlie (1978)

Charlie Muffin (published in the United States under the title Charlie M.) is a 1977 spy thriller novel written by Brian Freemantle.

== Synopsis ==
Charlie Muffin is an experienced operative in British Intelligence who has played a significant role in dismantling a major Soviet spy network in England, leading to its leader, Alexei Berenkov, receiving a forty-year prison sentence. Following the appointment of a new Director, Sir Henry Cuthbertson, the Department undergoes organisational changes reflecting his military background and management approach. These changes affect Charlie's position, as Cuthbertson favours Snare and Harrison for key field roles despite their limited operational experience.

Charlie, Snare and Harrison are on assignment in East Berlin and are about to separately make the crossing over to West Berlin. Harrison has safely made the crossing earlier and Snare is about to do so; Charlie, who will make his own crossing by car later, is very nervous about the heightened security. Snare makes an uneventful crossing, but Charlie meets up with Gunther, an East Berlin student trying to escape to the West, and gives him the car he was supposed to cross over in and necessary documents. With Charlie watching from a distance, Gunther drives the car into the East Berlin checkpoint, but the security people suddenly move in and Gunther is shot down while trying to run. Charlie makes his own crossing and meets up in West Berlin with his fellow agents, who are stunned to see him alive having seen and had reported his supposed death ... confirming in Charlie's mind that the whole business was a set-up to get him captured or killed.

In Moscow, General Valery Kalenin, chief planner of the KGB, is informed by his superiors of Berenkov's 40-year prison sentence. He is ordered to make sure that Berenkov is repatriated back to the Soviet Union within a reasonable amount of time...or else.

Charlie visits Berenkov, with whom he has apparently become friendly, in prison for an interrogation which appears to Cuthbertson, his deputy Wilberforce, Snare and Harrison to be a complete failure. Cuthbertson is determined to have Charlie demoted as far as possible and has recommended as much to his Minister. However, Charlie proves that his interrogation "was one of the most productive [he] can remember having had with a captured spy," and has provided valuable information which Cuthbertson has been unable to realise.

Charlie spends the evening with Janet, Cuthbertson's secretary and god-daughter, with whom he is having an affair. After learning that Cuthbertson will be placing the blame for his premature recommendations on Wilberforce, Charlie promises that Cuthbertson will begging him for his help.

At a reception at the US Embassy in Moscow, Kalenin, who has never been seen in public before, makes a public appearance, which amazes William Braley, the Resident CIA operative, and provokes interest by snubbing the Americans and concentrating his attentions on the British Embassy members present. Informed of this, both Garson Ruttgers, Director of the CIA, and Cuthbertson come to the same conclusion: Kalenin wants to defect, but to the British, not to the Americans. Knowing that two opportunities to contact Kalenin are coming up, one at a Trade Fair in Leipzig and one at a party at the British Embassy in Moscow, Cuthbertson dispatches Harrison to Leipzig and Snare to Moscow to contact Kalenin and make arrangements for the hoped-for defection, while Ruttgers, arriving in London and kept on the outside by Cuthbertson, is determined that his agency will be involved.

Harrison makes a very clumsy contact with Kalenin in Leipzig, but is killed shortly afterwards trying to escape in a panic from Eastern German security forces. Cuthbertson, learning of this, decides not to tell Snare. At the British Embassy in Moscow, Snare meets briefly with Kalenin, who drops some pointed hints about how he can be contacted at a public park. However, Snare is seized shortly afterwards immediately by KGB agents and charged with black market dealing.

With no choice left, Cuthbertson is forced to ask Charlie for help. Charlie is certain that Kalenin's intended defection is a set-up, but agrees on condition that he be allowed to operate without interference. He makes his own way to Moscow, successfully contacts Kalenin (learning from Kalenin that Harrison and Snare were identified to the KGB by the CIA) and settles the main details about Kalenin's crossing from Czechoslovakia into Austria and about the amount of money to be paid to Kalenin ($500,000 in US currency).

Back in London at a meeting in Cuthbertson's office, Ruttgers (who has been using a threat by the US State Department that the President may snub London in an upcoming European tour to force the British into co-operating) is stunned to learn that Charlie has made successful contact with Kalenin without his knowledge. He is even more outraged by Charlie's insisting that the money (provided by the Americans) must be laundered by himself and Braley, and that Braley must remain close to Charlie at all times (thereby neutralising the possibility of Charlie being exposed), but the threat of the facts about Snare and Harrison's exposure being revealed makes him give in.

Cuthbertson confronts Janet about her affair with Charlie and instructs her to keep him informed about Charlie. She agrees ... in exchange for expenses.

Charlie and Braley hit casinos throughout Europe, "washing" the money and taking down random serial numbers. Later, they meet with Kalenin in Prague and finalise the details of the crossing at an obscure Czech border point. Charlie is still very worried and makes no secret of his belief that the whole thing is a big mistake on their part. Meanwhile, Berenkov is not adapting well to prison life and is beginning to crumble, while in Moscow Kalenin's superiors berate him for his apparent lack of progress in getting Berenkov back.

Both Cuthbertson and Ruttgers decide to move 200 agents (100 British and 100 American) into Austria to safeguard Kalenin and to go themselves to meet with Kalenin at the CIA safehouse in Vienna. Charlie arrives in Vienna and is briefed on the plan (part of which, such as that the car he'll be driving will contain a radio-controlled bomb, he is not told). Both he and Braley (who is now as uneasy as Charlie) make their concerns known to their respective bosses, but are disregarded.

Charlie and Braley arrive that night at the border crossing point and, as per Kalenin's instructions, Charlie crosses over with the money onto Czech soil to meet with the waiting Kalenin. After verifying the money, the two men cross back over into Austria and drive with Braley to the Vienna safehouse. There, Charlie leaves them to hide the car while Kalenin and Braley enter the safehouse.

Cuthbertson and Ruttgers welcome Kalenin and outline the intended plan to get him out of Austria. However, to their surprise, Kalenin seems to know as much about it as they do, and they are even more amazed by his next words: that, in retaliation for the destruction of the Berenkov network and Berenkov's imprisonment, the Soviet Union had decided to both have Berenkov repatriated and deal to the Western Intelligence communities "as harmful a blow as possible." To that end, he used himself as bait and the plan has worked perfectly: his men have captured the 200 British and American agents and now are in complete control of the house, and both Cuthbertson and Ruttgers will be going back with Kalenin to Moscow to be used as barter in exchange for Berenkov's release; the captured agents will be fingerprinted and photographed (making them useless for future Intelligence work) and then released. Cuthbertson and Ruttgers at first can't believe that this is happening, but then they realise that Charlie isn't there. Smiling, Kalenin confirms Cuthbertson's suspicions that Charlie had provided inside information and that Cuthbertson has only himself to blame because of his treatment of Charlie. The money is now Charlie's, and both Cuthbertson and Ruttgers realise with horror that they will not only be completely discredited but also made laughingstocks.

Where they are in hiding, Charlie and Edith burn the recorded bills and relax. Charlie knows that he will be hunted, but assures Edith that no one will ever think of looking for the two of them where they are now (in Brighton). He also tells Edith that his affair with Janet (which Edith knew about all along) was necessary because it provided him with both a pipeline into Cuthbertson's office and chances to mislead Cuthbertson (since Charlie knew Janet was informing on him), but that he never loved Janet.

In the novel's conclusion, Berenkov relaxes aboard a commercial flight to Moscow with a glass of champagne and toasts his absent friend.

== Sequels ==
Several more Charlie Muffin novels have been published since:

- Clap Hands, Here Comes Charlie (1978; published in the U.S. as Here Comes Charlie M)
- The Inscrutable Charlie Muffin (1979)
- Charlie Muffin's Uncle Sam (1980; published in the U.S. as Charlie Muffin U.S.A.)
- Madrigal for Charlie Muffin (1981)
- Charlie Muffin and Russian Rose (1985; published in the U.S. as The Blind Run [1986])
- Charlie Muffin San (1987; published in the U.S. as See Charlie Run)
- The Run Around (1989)
- Comrade Charlie (1992)
- Charlie's Apprentice (1994)
- Charlie's Chance (1996; published in the U.S. as Bomb Grade [1997])
- Dead Men Living (2000)
- Kings of Many Castles (2001)
- Red Star Rising (2010)
- Red Star Burning (2012)
- Red Star Falling (2013)

== Adaptations ==
The book was filmed in 1979 as Charlie Muffin (released in the United States under the title A Deadly Game) directed by Jack Gold and starring David Hemmings as Charlie Muffin, Pinkas Braun as Kalenin, Ian Richardson as Cuthbertson, Sam Wanamaker as Ruttgers, Clive Revill as Berenkov and Sir Ralph Richardson in one of his final roles as Sir Archibald Willoughby.

A radio adaptation by Geoffrey M. Matthews was broadcast in 1986 on BBC Radio 4's Saturday Night Theatre starring Philip Jackson as Charlie Muffin and Sandor Elès as General Kalenin. In 1989, a radio adaptation of the sequel Clap Hands Here Comes Charlie, also adapted by Matthews, was broadcast on BBC Radio 4 with Philip Jackson again as Muffin, Sandor Elès again as Kalenin and Geoffrey Whitehead as Rupert Willoughby.

== First edition (US) ==
Freemantle, Brian. Charlie Muffin. Doubleday, 1977. ISBN 0-385-13021-X.
