= Charlie Muffin =

1979 TV spy film by Jack Gold

- Video cover
- Directed by: Jack Gold
- Produced by: Ted Childs
- Starring: David Hemmings; Sam Wanamaker; Jennie Linden
- Cinematography: Ousama Rawi
- Edited by: Keith Palmer
- Release date: 1979
- Running time: 104 minutes
- Country: United Kingdom
- Language: English

Charlie Muffin (U.S. title: A Deadly Game) is a 1979 British made-for-TV film directed by Jack Gold and starring David Hemmings, Ralph Richardson, Sam Wanamaker, Pinkas Braun, Ian Richardson, Shane Rimmer and Jennie Linden. A Euston Films production, it was written by Keith Waterhouse based on the 1977 novel of the same name by Brian Freemantle.

== Plot ==
This Cold War espionage thriller follows the story of British anti-hero spy Charlie Muffin, who has fallen on hard times since the forced retirement of Sir Archibald Willoughby, his previous boss at the British secret service. His new boss, Sir Henry Cuthbertson, a former military man who epitomises the haughty upper-class British imperialist, barely attempts to conceal his disdain for the under-educated agent who, although more and highly experienced, quite obviously does not stem from the "right class". At the start of the film, it is established that Charlie has been deemed expendable and accordingly is set up to be captured or killed during a mission to East Germany — despite having been responsible for the mission's success. However, Charlie religiously follows his former chief's first rule: "Always secure an escape route", and another man is killed in his place. Cuthbertson's lap-dog agents Snare and Harrison — both totally lacking in experience and as arrogant as their boss — are shocked and embarrassed to see Muffin returning alive and well.

Back in the UK, Muffin's humiliation does not end, as Cuthbertson attempts to demote him over Charlie's supposed failure in interrogating a captured Russian agent. Because of Cutherbertson's not following established British Intelligence guidelines and Charlie's proving that his interrogation was actually a success, Charlie escapes demotion and goes on leave, which he spends with his wife Edith, while at the same time maintaining an affair with Cuthbertson's secretary-receptionist.

Next, the story unfolds around British and American attempts to facilitate a safe defection of high-ranking Soviet General Valery Kalenin, KGB Director of Operations for more than twenty years. CIA Director Garson Ruttgers proves equally ambitious but not much smarter and ultimately equally as officious and presumptuous as his British counterpart. After Harrison and Snare's spectacular downfalls (one is killed in Leipzig trying to escape capture by KGB agents and the other is actually captured in Moscow) as the result of CIA interference and because the Americans are using diplomatic pressure on the British to make Kalenin's defection a joint Anglo-American operation, Cuthbertson has no choice but to call in Charlie to handle the affair. Charlie meets with Kalenin in Moscow without the CIA finding out, and Ruttgers' aide Braley, a good-hearted but docile sideshow official, is assigned to accompany Muffin first to casinos in various cities in order to "launder" the $500,000 Kalenin is demanding as the price of his defection and later to Prague to liaise with Kalenin on the final details. Meanwhile, Cuthbertson, who is still wary of Charlie (who keeps insisting that Kalenin's defection is false and a trap), arranges with his secretary-receptionist that she spy on Charlie during their liaisons together.

After the arrangements have been made, Charlie, Braley, Cuthbertson and Ruttgers meet in a safehouse in Vienna. Charlie and Braley meet Kalenin at an obscure border-crossing post and escort him to the safehouse. Charlie leaves to hide the car, while Cuthbertson and Ruttgers jubilantly welcome Kalenin. However, their joy is short-lived when Kalenin reveals that his "defection" was merely the bait in an elaborate trap to capture the heads of both MI5 and the CIA in order to exchange them for an important Russian agent currently imprisoned in England, and that his men are now in complete control of the safehouse. Cuthbertson and Ruttgers realize too late that Kalenin's plan couldn't have succeeded without inside help...from Charlie, who has escaped with the money intended for Kalenin.

The Russian agent is released and flies home to Moscow, while Cuthbertson and Ruttgers are presumably disgraced and dismissed from their positions, and Charlie and Edith, now in hiding in Brighton, celebrate their freedom with the money.

== Cast ==
- David Hemmings as Charlie Muffin
- Sam Wanamaker as Garson Ruttgers
- Jennie Linden as Edith
- Pinkas Braun as General Valery Kalenin
- Ian Richardson as Sir Henry Cuthbertson
- Rohan McCullough as Janet
- Sir Ralph Richardson as Sir Archibald Willoughby
- Shane Rimmer as William Braley
- Tony Mathews as Harrison
- Christopher Godwin as Snare
- Clive Revill as Alexei Berenkov
- Donald Churchill as Wilberforce
- Reinhold Olszewski as General Kastanazy
- Frederick Treves as Colonel Wilcox
- Elspeth March as Mrs. Heiderman
- Olaf Pooley as Soviet First Secretary
- David Daker as Bolton
- Charles Keating as Keys, Secretary of State USA

== Reception ==
The New York Times wrote: "Directed crisply and cleverly by Jack Gold ... Charlie Muffin is a diverting spy adventure, complete with a genuine surprise ending. The characters sometimes dissolve into caricatures, creating the childish impression that the British and American agents are idiots while the Russians are generally masterful."
