= John Collin (actor) =

British actor (1928–1987)

- in The Protectors: The First Circle (1973)
- Born: John Colin Smith; 18 October 1928; Burley in Wharfedale, Yorkshire, England
- Died: 25 February 1987 (aged 58); Bradford, Yorkshire, England
- Occupation: Actor
- Years active: 1961–1983

John Collin (born John Colin Smith; 18 October 1928 – 25 February 1987) was a British actor frequently seen on UK television during the 1960s and 1970s, mainly in supporting roles such as ITC's The Saint (S5/E21). Collin's best-known role was as Detective Sergeant Cecil Haggar in the long running BBC police series Z-Cars. Another notable role was as Guardian officer Tom Weston in the 1971 ITV political fantasy The Guardians.

He also played Mr. Alderson, the father-in-law of James Herriot, in both the 1975 film All Creatures Great and Small and the later BBC TV series television series.

== Filmography ==
Year	Title	Role	Notes
1959	Breakout	Barman	Uncredited
1962	The Valiant	Sergeant	
1962	The Pirates of Blood River	Lance	Uncredited
1963	Cleopatra	Roman Officer	Uncredited
1963	The Three Lives of Thomasina	Villager	Uncredited
1965	Dead Man's Chest	Det. Insp. Briggs	Edgar Wallace Mysteries
1966	The Witches	Dowsett	
1968	Star!	Jack Roper	
1969	Before Winter Comes	Sgt. Woody	
1970	The Last Escape	Sgt. Henry McBee	
1971	Been Down So Long It Looks Like Up to Me	Sergeant Woody	
1972	Innocent Bystanders	Asimov	
1973	Man at the Top	Wisbech	
1975	All Creatures Great and Small	Mr. Alderson	
1979	Tess	John Durbeyfield	
1981	The Guns and the Fury	Mr. Randolph	

== Television ==
Year	Title	Role	Notes
1964	Z Cars	Nick Parks	1 episode
1967-68	The Saint	Sergio/Cable	2 episodes
1971	The Guardians	Tom Weston	7 episodes
1971	Public Eye	Allan Biddersloe	1 episode
1971-76, 1978	Z Cars	DS Cecil Haggar	51 episodes
1973	The Protectors	Slade	Episode: "The First Circle"
1978	Wuthering Heights	Mr Earnshaw	
1978-83	All Creatures Great and Small	Mr Alderson	3 episodes
