= The Gorilla of Soho =

1968 film

- Directed by: Alfred Vohrer
- Written by: Edgar Wallace (novel); H.O Gregor; Harald Philipp
- Produced by: H.O Gregor
- Starring: Horst Tappert; Uschi Glas; Uwe Friedrichsen
- Cinematography: Karl Löb
- Edited by: Jutta Hering
- Music by: Peter Thomas
- Production company: Rialto Film
- Distributed by: Constantin Film
- Release date: 27 September 1968
- Running time: 96 minutes
- Country: West Germany
- Language: German

The Gorilla of Soho (German: Der Gorilla von Soho) is 1968 West German crime film directed by Alfred Vohrer and starring Horst Tappert, Uschi Glas and Uwe Friedrichsen. It was part of Rialto Film's long-running series of Edgar Wallace adaptations.

It was shot on location around London and at the Spandau Studios in Berlin. The film's sets were designed by the art directors Walter Kutz and Wilhelm Vorwerg.

== Cast ==
- Horst Tappert as Insp. David Perkins
- Uschi Glas as Susan McPherson
- Uwe Friedrichsen as Dr. Hermitage
- Hubert von Meyerinck as Sir Arthur
- Herbert Fux as Mr. Sugar
- Inge Langen as Mother Superior / Oberin
- Beate Hasenau as Cora Watson
- Albert Lieven as Henry Parker
- Ilse Pagé as Miss Finley
- Hilde Sessak as Sister Elizabeth
- Ralf Schermuly as Edgar Bird
- Maria Litto as Gloria
- Claus Holm as Dr. Jeckyll
- Ingrid Back as Patsy
- Franz-Otto Krüger as Police Doctor
- Eric Vaessen as Gordon Stuart
- Catana Cayetano as Dorothy Smith
- Heidrun Hankammer as Mädchen im Heim
- Käthe Jöken-König as Susan's Mother
- Uschi Mood as Aktmodell
- Ingrid Steeger as Waitress
- Reinhold Timm as Zeichner
- Alfred Vohrer as Edgar Wallace
- Bernd Wilczewski as Muskelmodell

== Bibliography ==
- Bergfelder, Tim (2005) [2004]. International Adventures: German Popular Cinema and European Co-productions in the 1960s. New York: Berghahn Books. ISBN 978-1-57181-539-2.
