= The Last of the Mohicans (1968 film) =

1968 film

- Written by: James Fenimore Cooper
- Directed by: Jean Dréville; Pierre Gaspard-Huit; Sergiu Nicolaescu
- Starring: Hellmut Lange; Pierre Massimi
- Countries of origin: Romania; France; West Germany
- Original language: Romanian

Production
- Running time: 80 minutes

Original release
- Release: 1968

The Last of the Mohicans (Romanian: Ultimul mohican) is a 1968 internationally co-produced Western film, co-directed by Jean Dréville, Pierre Gaspard-Huit and Sergiu Nicolaescu. It was the second episode of the European TV miniseries Leatherstocking Tales.

== Cast ==
In alphabetical order

- Otto Ambros as Colonel Munro
- Alexandru David as Uncas
- Roland Ganemet as David Gamut
- Luminița Iacobescu as Cora Munro
- Hellmut Lange as Natty Bumppo
- Sybil Maas as Alice Munro
- Pierre Massimi as Chingachgook
- Adrian Mihai
- Ali Rafie as Magua
