= The Light of Heart =

1940 play written by Emlyn Williams

- Original language: English
- Written by: Emlyn Williams
- Genre: Drama

Premiere
- Date: 21 February 1940
- Place: Apollo Theatre, London

The Light of Heart is a 1940 play by the British writer Emlyn Williams.

It ran for 127 performances at the Apollo Theatre in London's West End between 21 February and 8 June 1940. The cast included Godfrey Tearle, Megs Jenkins, Gladys Henson, Elliott Mason and Angela Baddeley. It later ran for 55 performances at the Guild Theatre on Broadway.

== Adaptations ==
In 1942 it was adapted into the Hollywood film Life Begins at Eight-Thirty directed by Irving Pichel and starring Monty Woolley, Ida Lupino and Cornel Wilde. Twenty years later it was made into a West German film Life Begins at Eight starring Johanna Matz.

== Bibliography ==
- Goble, Alan. The Complete Index to Literary Sources in Film. Walter de Gruyter, 1999.
- Wearing, J.P. The London Stage 1940-1949: A Calendar of Productions, Performers, and Personnel. Rowman & Littlefield, 2014.
