= Life Begins at Eight =

1962 film

- Directed by: Michael Kehlmann
- Written by: Horst Budjuhn
- Based on: The Light of Heart by Emlyn Williams
- Produced by: Utz Utermann
- Starring: O.E. Hasse; Johanna Matz; Helmut Wildt
- Cinematography: Kurt Hasse
- Edited by: Gertrud Hinz-Nischwitz
- Music by: Peter Sandloff
- Production company: UFA
- Distributed by: UFA
- Release date: 4 January 1962
- Running time: 100 minutes
- Country: West Germany
- Language: German

Life Begins at Eight (German: Das Leben beginnt um acht) is a 1962 West German drama film directed by Michael Kehlmann and starring O.E. Hasse, Johanna Matz and Helmut Wildt. It is an adaptation of the 1940 play The Light of Heart by Emlyn Williams, previously adapted into a 1942 Hollywood film Life Begins at Eight-Thirty. The action is moved from the play's setting of London to Berlin.

The film's sets were designed by the art directors Hans Berthel and Johannes Ott. Completed in late 1961, it premiered at the Marmorhaus in Berlin early in the New Year.

== Synopsis ==
A former stage star, struggling with the decline of his career and a drinking problem, lives with his daughter Cattrin. A young composer falls in love with her and manages to secure her father some work. However his demons ultimately overwhelm him and he commits suicide, freeing his daughter to live her own life.

== Cast ==
- O.E. Hasse as Mac Thomas
- Johanna Matz as Cattrin, seine Tochter
- Helmut Wildt as Robert Hauser
- Gudrun Thielemann as Fanny Ehrenwirth
- Gundel Thormann as Emily Lawrence
- Walter Buschhoff as Willibald Barthels
- Eva Crüwell as Susanne Wenk
- Fritz Rémond Jr. as Frenkel, Manager
- Hans Schwarz Jr. as Charly
- Erna Sellmer as Frau Banner
- Walter Tarrach as Dr. Stadtländer
- Gerd Vespermann as Gerber, Garderobier
- Stefan Wigger as Eberhard Bezel, Polizist
- Lissy Arna
- Ursula Diestel
- Edith Elsholtz
- Hans Epskamp
- Richard Handwerk
- Harald Holberg
- Günther Stopnik
- Max Strassberg
- Achim Strietzel
- Egon Vogel
- Lilo Zabke

== Bibliography ==
- Bock, Hans-Michael & Bergfelder, Tim. The Concise CineGraph. Encyclopedia of German Cinema. Berghahn Books, 2009.
- Goble, Alan. The Complete Index to Literary Sources in Film. Walter de Gruyter, 1999.
