= Michael Hinz =

German actor (1939–2008)

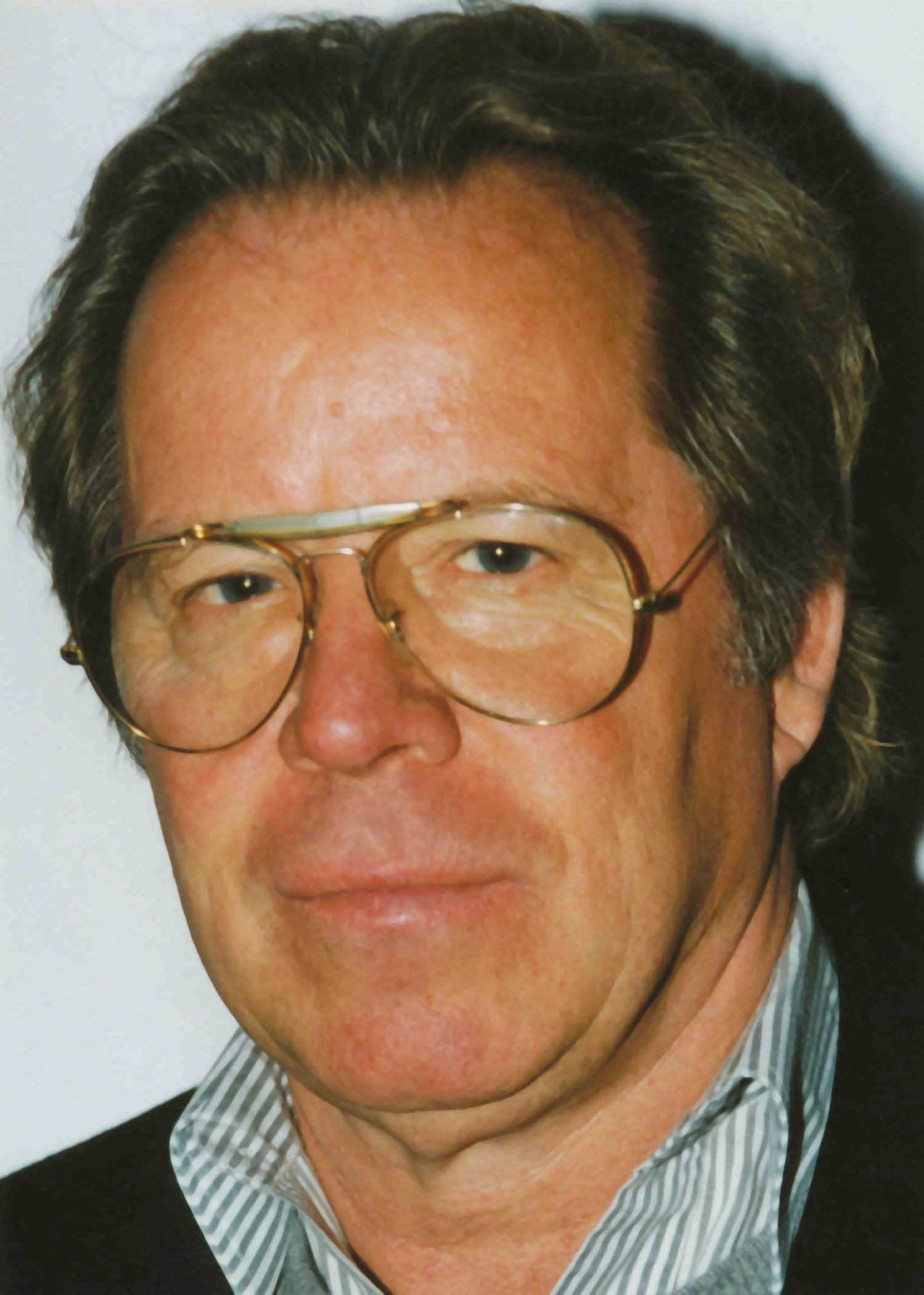
- Born: 28 December 1939; Berlin, Germany
- Died: 6 November 2008 (aged 68); Munich, Germany
- Occupation: Actor
- Spouse(s): Ingrid van Bergen Viktoria Brams (m. 1968–2008)
- Children: Carolin van Bergen, 2 others
- Parent(s): Werner Hinz and Ehmi Bessel
- Relatives: Knut Hinz (brother); Dinah Hinz (half-sister)

Signature
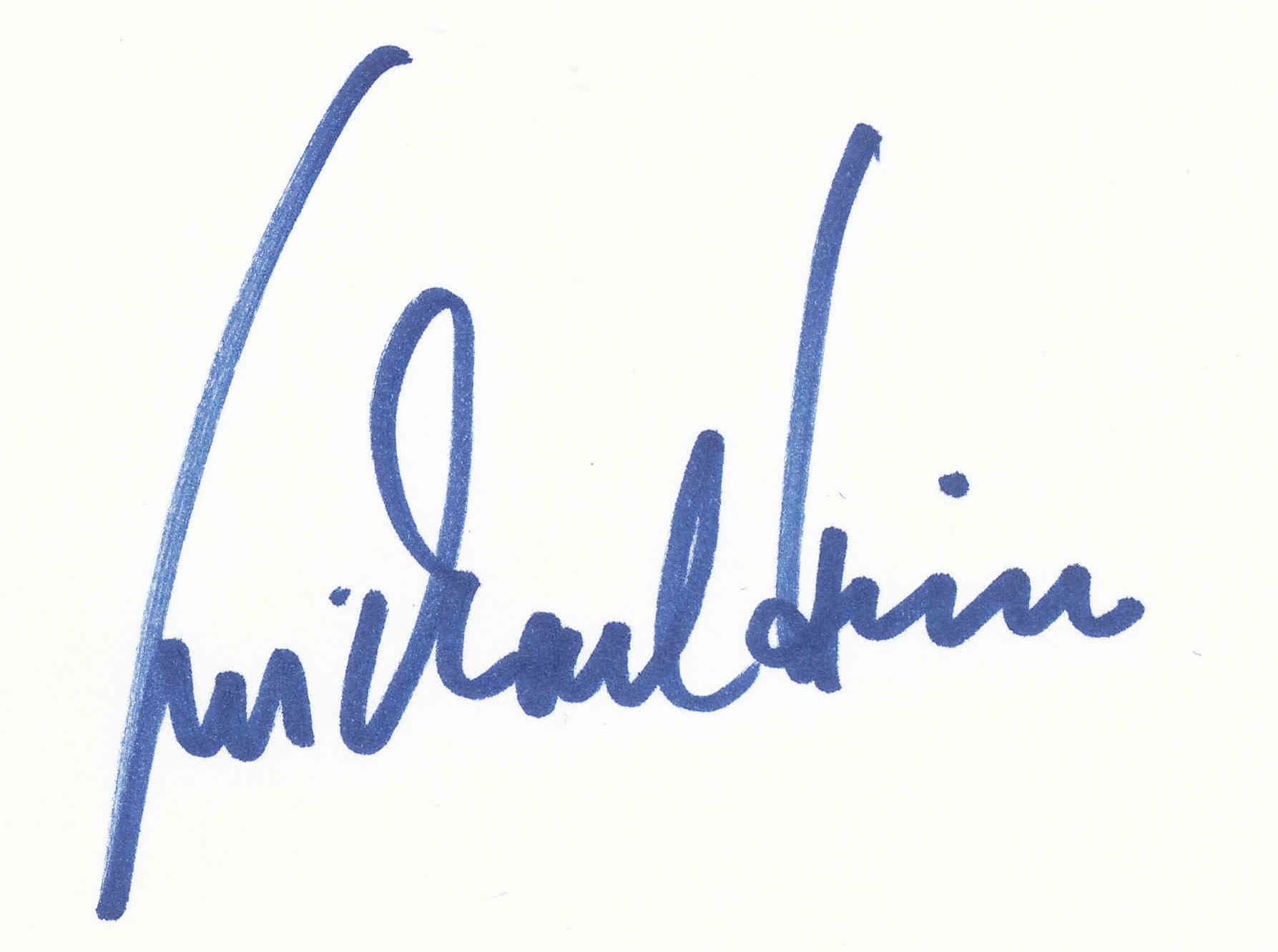

Michael Hinz (28 December 1939 – 6 November 2008) was a German actor.

== Life and career ==
Hinz came from an acting family, his parents were Werner Hinz and Ehmi Bessel, both actors, as well as his brother Knut and half-sister Dinah.

After growing up in Berlin and Hamburg, Hinz had his first theatrical role in 1958 in Terence Rattigan's The Sleeping Prince at the Thalia Theater in Hamburg. A year later, he starred in his first film, Die Brücke, which won the Golden Globe Award for Best Foreign Language Film and was nominated for the Best Foreign Language Film Oscar at the 32nd Academy Awards.

Hinz also starred in numerous films, such as The Longest Day (in which he played Manfred Rommel, the son of his father's character Erwin Rommel), television series, and was the voice actor for Jeff Goldblum in The Ray Bradbury Theater and Scott Wilson in the 1967 film In Cold Blood. He is best remembered for playing Uncle Quentin in the British television series adaptation of Enid Blyton's The Famous Five in the late 1970s.

Hinz's first wife was the actress Ingrid van Bergen, with whom he had his first daughter Carolin van Bergen, who later also became an actress. In 1967, he met the actress Viktoria Brams. They were married from 1968 until Hinz's death in 2008.

In October 2008, Hinz was found unconscious by his wife at home in Munich as the result of a stroke, spending three weeks in a coma until his death on 6 November. His ashes were interred at the Westfriedhof in Munich.

== Awards ==
- 1963 Deutscher Filmpreis: Bester Nachwuchsdarsteller (best young actor)

== Selected filmography ==
- Die Brücke (1959), as Walter Forst
- Stage Fright (1960), as Peter
- The Inheritance of Bjorndal (1960), as Adelheid's Son
- Gustav Adolf's Page (1961), as Schwedischer Kadett
- Und sowas nennt sich Leben (1961), as Martin Berger
- Geständnis einer Sechzehnjährigen (1961), as Hans
- Legge di guerra (1961), as Jossip
- The Phony American (1961), as Helmut Krauss
- The Longest Day (1962), as Manfred Rommel (uncredited)
- Only a Woman (1962)
- The Lightship (1963), as Fred Freytag
- Es war mir ein Vergnügen (1963), as George Kerr
- Jack and Jenny (1963), as Josef Lancelot
- Lana, Queen of the Amazons (1964), as Matteo
- Aunt Frieda (1965), as Karl Schultheiss
- Onkel Filser – Allerneueste Lausbubengeschichten (1966), as Max von Rupp
- Cat and Mouse (1967), as Jagdflieger
- Der verlogene Akt (1969)
- The Last Escape (1970), as Junior SS Officer
- Four Times That Night (1971), as Rudy
- Return of Halleluja (1972), as Lt. Von Steffen
- The Hunted (1972), as Cory
- Love Bavarian Style (1973), as Heino (uncredited)
- Magdalena – vom Teufel besessen (1974), as Dr. Stone
- Champagner aus dem Knobelbecher (1975), as Unteroffizier
- The Spy Who Never Was (1976), as Martin
- Die Kette (1977, TV film), as Hubert Rogers
- The Famous Five (1978–79, TV series), as Quentin Kirrin
- The Death of Mario Ricci (1983), as Otto Schmidhauser
