= The Castle (1968 film) =

1968 film

- Film poster
- Directed by: Rudolf Noelte
- Screenplay by: Rudolf Noelte; Maximilian Schell
- Based on: The Castle by Franz Kafka
- Produced by: Rudolf Noelte; Maximilian Schell
- Starring: Maximilian Schell
- Cinematography: Wolfgang Treu
- Edited by: Dagmar Hirtz
- Music by: Herbert Trantow
- Production companies: Alfa Film; Rudolf Noelte Filmproduktion
- Distributed by: Cinema Service International Filmverleih
- Release date: 4 September 1968
- Running time: 88 minutes
- Country: West Germany
- Language: German

The Castle (German: Das Schloß) is a 1968 West German film directed by Rudolf Noelte and starring Maximilian Schell, Cordula Trantow, Trudik Daniel and Helmut Qualtinger. It is based on the 1926 eponymous novel by Franz Kafka. The film won two German Film Awards. It was chosen as West Germany's official submission to the 44th Academy Awards for Best Foreign Language Film, but did not manage to receive a nomination. It was also listed to compete at the 1968 Cannes Film Festival, but the festival was cancelled due to the events of May 1968 in France.

The film's sets were designed by the art director Hertha Hareiter.

== Cast ==
- Maximilian Schell as "K"
- Cordula Trantow as Frieda
- Trudik Daniel as Innkeeper's Wife
- Friedrich Maurer as Mayor
- Helmut Qualtinger as Burgel
- Else Ehser as Mizzi
- E. O. Fuhrmann as Momus
- Karl Hellmer as Schoolmaster
- Benno Hoffmann as Uniformed Man
- Hanns Ernst Jäger as Landlord
- Iva Janžurová as Olga
- Georg Lehn as Barnabas
- Leo Mally as Gerstäcker
- Franz Misar as Arthur
- Johann Misar as Jeremiah
- Armand Ozory as Erlanger
- Hans Pössenbacher as Innkeeper
- Martha Wallner as Amalia

== See also ==
- List of submissions to the 44th Academy Awards for Best Foreign Language Film
- List of German submissions for the Academy Award for Best Foreign Language Film
