= His Best Friend (1962 film) =

1962 film

- Directed by: Luis Trenker
- Written by: Gustav Kampendonk; Luis Trenker
- Produced by: Kurt Ulrich
- Starring: Toni Sailer; Dietmar Schönherr; Hilti von Allmen
- Cinematography: Bertl Höcht; Rolf Kästel
- Edited by: Adolf Schlyssleder
- Music by: Heinrich Riethmüller; Peter Sandloff
- Production company: Kurt Ulrich Film
- Distributed by: Nora-Filmverleih
- Release date: 30 November 1962
- Running time: 91 minutes
- Country: West Germany
- Language: German

His Best Friend (German: Sein bester Freund) is a 1962 West German drama film directed by Luis Trenker and starring Toni Sailer, Dietmar Schönherr and Hilti von Allmen.

== Cast ==
- Toni Sailer as Peter Haller
- Dietmar Schönherr as Marius Melichar
- Hilti von Allmen as Anderl Burri
- Hans Nielsen as Direktor Imhoff
- Elke Roesler as Clarissa, seine Tochter
- Carmela Corren as Judith Gerlach
- Peer Schmidt as Pat Nicot
- Hans Richter as Max
- Franz Muxeneder as Paul
- Rudolf Platte as Köhler
- Paul Westermeier
- Fritz Gertsch
- Gaby Banschenbach
- Luis Trenker

== Bibliography ==
- Thomas Elsaesser & Michael Wedel. The BFI companion to German cinema. British Film Institute, 1999.
