= Little Miss Dolittle =

- German theatrical release poster
- Directed by: Joachim Masannek
- Based on: Liliane Susewind by Tanya Stewner
- Starring: Malu Leicher; Christoph Maria Herbst; Peri Baumeister; Tom Beck; Aylin Tezel; Meret Becker
- Cinematography: Richard Van Oosterhout
- Edited by: Martin Rahner
- Production companies: Deutsche Columbia Pictures Filmproduktion; Dreamtool Entertainment; Velvet Film
- Distributed by: Sony Pictures Releasing
- Release date: 10 May 2018
- Running time: 101 minutes
- Countries: Germany; France; Belgium
- Language: German
- Box office: $4.5 million

Little Miss Dolittle (German: Liliane Susewind - Ein tierisches Abenteuer, lit. 'Liliane Susewind - A beastly adventure') is a 2018 German-language film directed by Joachim Masannek.

== Cast ==
- Malu Leicher as Liliane Susewind
- Christoph Maria Herbst as Tierpfleger Toni
- Peri Baumeister as Regina Susewind
- Tom Beck as Ferdinand Susewind
- Aylin Tezel as Vanessa
- Meret Becker as Oberst Essig
