= Life Begins at Eight-Thirty =

1942 film by Irving Pichel

- 1942 Theatrical Poster
- Directed by: Irving Pichel
- Written by: Nunnally Johnson; F. Scott Fitzgerald (uncredited)
- Based on: The Light of Heart by Emlyn Williams
- Produced by: Nunnally Johnson
- Starring: Monty Woolley; Ida Lupino; Cornel Wilde
- Cinematography: Edward Cronjager
- Edited by: Fred Allen
- Music by: Alfred Newman
- Production company: Twentieth Century-Fox
- Distributed by: Twentieth Century-Fox
- Release date: December 9, 1942
- Running time: 85 minutes
- Country: United States
- Language: English

Life Begins at Eight-Thirty is a 1942 American comedy-drama romance film starring Monty Woolley as a washed-up, alcoholic actor, Ida Lupino as his daughter, and Cornel Wilde as her boyfriend. It is based on the West End play The Light of Heart by Emlyn Williams.

== Plot ==
New York actor Madden Thomas has fallen from grace due to alcoholism and manages to get fired from his job as Santa Claus in a department store on Christmas Eve. This puts both him and his sweet young daughter Kathi on the spot. Kathi is physically challenged with a paralyzed foot.

Because of the state he is in, Thomas is helped home to his daughter by a young composer named Robert Carter, who is their new neighbor. Robert takes a liking to Kathi and they become friends. Robert also manages to get Thomas a paid acting job, playing a part in a minor play he has made the music to. Robert's aunt Alma Lothian is a huge admirer of Thomas' previous work, and is overjoyed with the news of him getting the part. Kathi hopes that her father will take the chance and become as good as he once was. She is especially pleased with him slowing down on drinking.

One day when Kathi tries to buy new furniture for their apartment, she finds out that Thomas has large debts because of his drinking. She finds herself courted by Robert, who has fallen in love with her. She tells him she has hopes of a family but that she is scared of passing on her handicap to her children.

Thomas is offered a main part in a production of King Lear, but gets cold feet because of all the hard work he will have to put in. Kathi is overjoyed with the offer and tries to encourage him the best she can. Robert puts off a job in Hollywood to help arrange the music for the play.

Robert visits the doctor who delivered Kathi many years ago, and learns that her foot was damaged when Thomas dropped her when she was only a few months old. The doctor lied about the cause of the lameness to spare Thomas the guilt. This information enables Kathi to accept Robert's proposal.

Thomas improves greatly during rehearsals, and the engaged couple decide to wait until after opening night to tell him about their plans to move to Hollywood. He finds out by chance when the city clerk calls to fix the time of the marriage for the next day. He goes on a bender, thinking that Kathi is deserting him. He arrives drunk to the theater on the opening night and on top of everything else, Kathi is mad at him and reveals that he caused her lameness.

After their argument, Kathi feels guilty and regrets the decision to move to Hollywood. She talks to Robert and convinces him to stay in New York. Thomas overhears the conversation and realizes it is time she started a life of her own. He writes her a letter, urging her to move ahead as planned, then goes directly to Alma's home and accepts her proposal of marriage.

== Cast ==
- Monty Woolley as Madden Thomas
- Ida Lupino as Kathy Thomas
- Cornel Wilde as Robert Carter
- Sara Allgood as Alma Lothian
- Melville Cooper as Barty
- J. Edward Bromberg as Sid Gordon
- William Demarest as Police Officer
- Alec Craig as Santa Claus
- Lee Phelps as Bartender

== Production notes ==
The working title of this film was The Light of Heart. F. Scott Fitzgerald worked on the picture's screenplay. The extent of his contribution to the completed film has not been determined, however. Life Begins at Eight-Thirty was the last motion picture writing assignment for Fitzgerald, who died in December 1940.

The production ran from late July through late August 1942. Added scenes and retakes began 4 September 1942.

Williams' play was also the basis of a 1962 West German film entitled Life Begins at Eight, which was directed by Michael Kehlmann and starred O. E. Hasse and Johanna Matz.

== Reception ==
In a review upon release of the film, Bosley Crowther of The New York Times called the film "soft-hearted, sweetly sentimental, and occasionally jocular." He praised Woolley extensively, "for the spark of his personality is enough to lighten any film he plays."
