= Paul Bentley =

British singer and actor (born 1942)

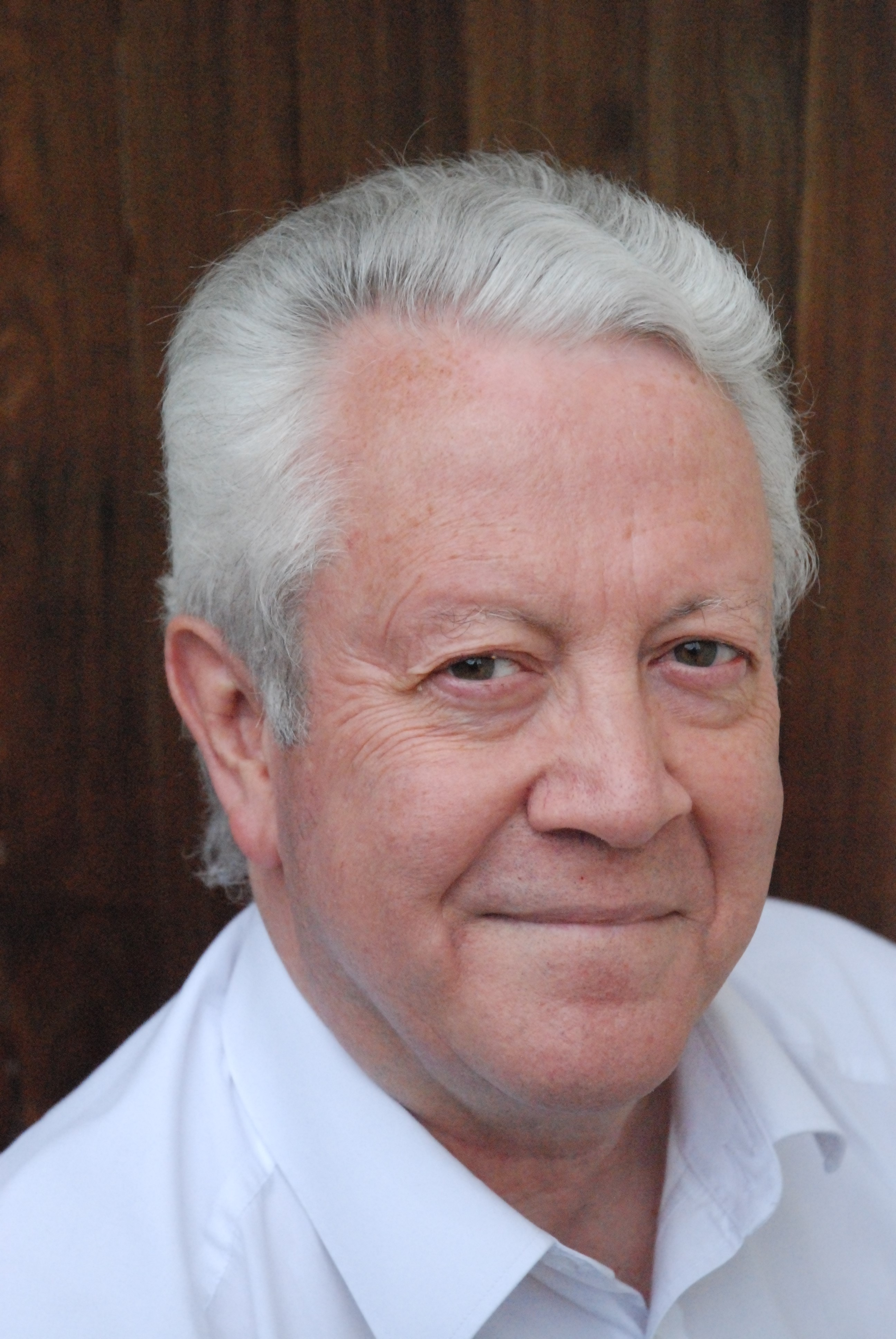
- Born: Paul Richard Bentley; 25 July 1942 (age 84); Sheffield, Yorkshire, England
- Occupations: Actor and writer
- Years active: 1967–present
- Spouse: Annie Healey (m. 1979)
- Children: 2

Paul Richard Bentley (born 25 July 1942) is a British stage, film and television actor, perhaps best known for playing the High Septon in the television series Game of Thrones. He is also a writer.

== Early life ==
Bentley was born in Sheffield and brought up in Surrey. He attended Wimbledon College, a Jesuit grammar school, and Kingston Polytechnic. He then attended Birmingham University, achieving a BA in English literature and an MA in Drama and Theatre Arts. His M.A. dissertation, on the stage history of Wagner's Parsifal, involved a research visit to the Wagner Festival Theatre at Bayreuth, Germany.

== Career ==
After university Bentley moved to Munich, hoping to become an opera director. He began acting in English programmes on the Bavarian radio station Bayerischer Rundfunk. He also appeared in the film The Last Escape, in which he played a British spy in Bavaria in World War Two.

He returned to England in 1970 and continued acting, mainly in repertory theatre, at venues including the Byre Theatre at St. Andrews, the Leicester Haymarket Theatre, the Duke's Playhouse at Lancaster, and the Newcastle Playhouse.

In 1973 Bentley wrote the book and lyrics for Shylock, a musical version of The Merchant of Venice, performed at the 1974 Edinburgh Festival. He played the title role; the composer and director was Roger Haines. Shylock won a Scotsman Fringe First Award. In 1977 an updated version called Fire Angel, set in a 20th century New York City Mafia nightclub, appeared at Her Majesty's Theatre, London. Bentley was the alternate leading man, his first West End part. A revised version of the original Shylock was produced at the Leicester Haymarket Studio Theatre in 1981 and at the Manchester Library Theatre in 1982. Bentley again played the title role and Haines directed both productions.

Bentley's second West End show was in Tommy Steele's Singin' In The Rain at the London Palladium. In 1985 he went to Dublin to play Captain Corcoran in H.M.S. Pinafore, which transferred to the Old Vic in 1986 and for which Bentley was nominated for an Olivier Award for the Outstanding Performance of the Year by an Actor in a Musical. This success led to four back-to-back West End shows lasting five years: Lend Me A Tenor, Follies, Cats and Aspects of Love. Next came an off-West-End Assassins followed by a national tour of Aspects of Love, then Phantom of the Opera in Manchester and back to London for Company, Kiss Me Kate and Dame Edna – the Spectacle. Bentley has other radio, television and film credits but most of his work has been in theatre.

In 1994 Bentley was asked by the Danish composer Poul Ruders to write the libretto for his opera The Handmaid's Tale based on Margaret Atwood's novel, which won a Cannes Classical Award and Reumert Prize. In A Handmaid's Diary, Bentley tells the story of the opera from the first phone call to the first night (directed by Phyllida Lloyd). Ruders' and Bentley's second opera was Kafka's Trial. Librettos for three other composers followed: Ana Sokolovic's The Midnight Court, Dominique Le Gendre's Bird of Night and James Rolfe's Inês.

Bentley has also written a novel, The Man Who Came After Hyacinth Bobo, about the Fourth Crusade and the Siege of Constantinople, published in Greek and English, plus occasional newspaper and magazine articles. Bentley's latest works include Inquisition, a play about the famous Jesuit scientist Teilhard de Chardin, and a radio play in which Jane Austen meets Lord Byron.

== Personal life ==
Paul Bentley married Annie Healey in 1979. They met at the Byre Theatre, St. Andrews, where Annie was an assistant stage manager. They have two daughters, Emma and Rebecca, who both work in the theatre. Bentley's sister, the novelist Ursula Bentley, died in 2004.

Bentley took part in Mastermind on BBC TV (15 March 1992) where his specialist subject was The Life and Works of King Ludwig II of Bavaria. He lost in this first round with a score of 29.

He is a member of the Wagner Society and the Society for the Promotion of Byzantine Studies. He was the Founder Chairman of the British Association for Modern Mosaic from 1999 to 2005 and remains a member. He is the editor of the website Mosaic Matters, a website about mosaics, and he also edits the British Teilhard Network.

== Awards and nominations ==
Year	Award	Production	Result
1986	Laurence Olivier Award for Best Actor in a Musical	H.M.S. Pinafore	Nominated

== Stage and screen credits ==
=== Theatre ===
Year	Title	Role	Notes
1983–84	Singin' In the Rain	Steve the Film Director	London Palladium, London
1985–86	H.M.S. Pinafore	Captain Corcoran	The Old Vic, London Gaiety Theatre, Dublin Tour
1986–87	Lend Me A Tenor	Tito Morelli (Il Stupendo)	Globe Theatre, London
1987	Follies	Roscoe	Shaftesbury Theatre, London
1987–89	Cats	Bustopher Jones & Gus	New London Theatre, London
1989–92	Aspects of Love	Marcel	Prince of Wales Theatre, London
1992	Assassins	Proprietor	Donmar Warehouse Theatre, London
1996	Company	Larry	Donmar Warehouse Theatre, London Albery Theatre, London
1997	Kiss Me Kate	Gremio	Regent's Park Open Air Theatre, London
1997	A Midsummer Night's Dream	Egeus	Regent's Park Open Air Theatre, London
1998	Edna – The Spectacle	Various roles	Theatre Royal Haymarket, London
1999	Persuasion	Sir Walter and Admiral Croft	Northcott Theater, Exeter Theatre Royal, Windsor
2001	Over The Moon	Richard	The Old Vic, London
2002	Iolanthe	Lord Chancellor	Savoy Theatre, London
2002	Follies	Roscoe	Royal Festival Hall, London
2004	We Happy Few	Various roles	Gielgud Theatre, London
2006–08	Mary Poppins	Admiral Boom and the Bank chairman	Prince Edward Theatre, London
2008	Gigi	Lawyer Dufresne	Regent's Park Open Air Theatre, London
2011	Bridget Jones' Diary	Mr. Darcy's Father	Working title workshop
2014	Aladdin	The Emperor	Central Theatre, Chatham
2015	The Sleeping Beauty	King Clarence	Gordon Craig Theatre, Stevenage
2016	Oliver	Mr. Brownlow	Grange Park Opera, Northington

=== Television ===
Year	Title	Role	Notes
2003	Absolute Power	Sandy "Rigor" Morters	BBC – Country Life
2004	The Courtroom	Inspector Jackson	Channel 4 – Season 1 Fists of Fury
2006	ChuckleVision	Mayor of Slapsbergen	BBC – Season 18 Oompah Oompah
2011	Doctor Who	Professor Candy	BBC – Series 6 Let's Kill Hitler
2011	Doctors	Mr. Gold	BBC – Episode 145 The Jug
2013–2015	Game of Thrones	High Septon	HBO & Sky – Seasons 3, 4 and 5
2021	The Nevers	Judge	HBO & Sky - Season 1

=== Film ===
Year	Title	Role	Notes
1970	The Last Escape	Jarvis	United Artists
2001	Jack Brown and the Curse of the Crown	Rupert the Butler	Hot Gold Ltd
2011	The Iron Lady	Douglas Hurd	Pathé Films

=== Radio ===
Year	Title	Role	Notes
1986	The Threepenny Opera	Macheath	BBC Radio 3
1990	Friday Night Is Music Night	Various roles	BBC Radio 2
2009	The Good Companions	Morton Mitcham	BBC Radio 3

=== Recordings as singer ===
Year	Title	Composed & Written By	Role	Record Company
1987	Follies	Sondheim & Goldman	Roscoe	First Night Records
1989	Aspects of Love	Lloyd Webber & Black & Hart	Marcel	Polydor
1997	Passion	Sondheim & Lapine	Colonel Ricci	First Night Records

=== Recordings as librettist ===
Year	Title	Composer	Record Company
2000	The Handmaid's Tale	Poul Ruders	dacapo
2006	Kafka's Trial	Poul Ruders	dacapo

=== Operas as librettist ===
- The Handmaid's Tale – composer Poul Ruders, director Brenna Corner – Detroit Opera, 2026
- The Handmaid's Tale – composer Poul Ruders, director Brenna Corner – Banff Centre for Arts – Banff, Canada, 2025
- The Handmaid's Tale – composer Poul Ruders, director John Fulljames – San Francisco Opera, 2024
- The Handmaid's Tale – composer Poul Ruders, director Peter Carp – Theater Freiburg, Freiburg, 2024
- The Handmaid's Tale – composer Poul Ruders, director Jenna Elser – Glow Theatre – Greenville, South Carolina, 2023
- The Handmaid's Tale – composer Poul Ruders, director John Fulljames – Royal Danish Opera, Copenhagen, 2022
- The Handmaid's Tale – composer Poul Ruders, director Annilese Miskimmon – English National Opera, London, 2022
- The Handmaid’s Tale – composer Poul Ruders, director Anne Bogart – Boston Lyric Opera, Boston, 2019
- The Handmaid’s Tale – composer Poul Ruders, director Linda Thompson – Gertrude Opera, Yarra Valley Opera Festival, Melbourne, 2018
- Ines – composer James Rolfe, director Jennifer Tarver – Queen of Puddings Music Theatre, Enwave Theatre, Toronto, 2009
- Bird of Night – composer Dominique Le Gendre, director Irina Brown – Royal Opera Covent Garden, Linbury Studio, London, 2006
- The Midnight Court – composer Ana Sokolovic, director Michael Cavanagh – Queen of Puddings Music Theatre, Harbourfront Centre, Toronto 2005; Royal Opera Covent Garden, Linbury Studio, London, 2006
- Kafka's Trial – composer Poul Ruders, director Francisco Negrin – Opera House, Copenhagen, 2005
- The Handmaid's Tale – composer Poul Ruders, director Eric Simonson – Minnesota Opera, Minneapolis, 2003
- The Handmaid's Tale – composer Poul Ruders, director Phyllida Lloyd – Royal Danish Opera, Copenhagen, 2000; English National Opera, London, 2003; Canadian Opera Company, Toronto, 2004

=== Bibliography ===
- A playwright's quest for a missing Pierre Teilhard de Chardin file, The Christian Century, 10 July 2018
- The Sixth Proposition, The Tablet, 2 June 2018
- Teilhard de Chardin, Original Sin, and The Six Propositions, with David Grumett, Zygon, 16 April 2018
- The Mosaicing of Westminster Cathedral, in New Light on Old Glass, British Museum 2013
- The Man Who Came After Hyacinth Bobo, Fourth Crusade novel, Amazon 2011
- Ines, libretto based on the Inês de Castro legend, 2009
- Bird of Night, libretto set in Trinidad, 2006
- Thrills not theology, article on The Da Vinci Code for the Daily Telegraph, 6 May 2006
- Kafka the comedian, article for the Daily Telegraph, 28 February 2005
- The Midnight Court, libretto based on the poem by Brian Merriman, 2005
- What Islam took from Byzantium, article for the Catholic Herald, 14 May 2004
- A Handmaid's Diary, how The Handmaid's Tale became an opera, Wilhelm Hansen 2004
- Ο άνθρωπος που διαδέχθηκε τον Υάκινθο Βωβό, Fourth Crusade novel, Enalios 2004
- Lost for Words, article on Berlioz and Wagner, Opera Now, Jan/Feb 2003
- The Handmaid's Tale vocal score, Wilhelm Hansen 2002
- Time to cover a ton of bricks, article for the Daily Telegraph, 24 July 1999
