= Dinah Hinz =

German actress (1934–2020)

- Born: Dinah Eleonora Weiss; 14 February 1934; Heidelberg, Baden, Nazi Germany
- Died: 14 July 2020 (aged 86); Zürich, Switzerland
- Occupations: Actress and audiobook narrator

Dinah Eleonora Hinz, married name Hinz-Weiss (14 February 1934 – 14 July 2020) was a German film and stage actress and audiobook narrator.

Hinz died in Zürich on 14 July 2020, aged 86.

== Life ==
Dinah Hinz was the oldest child of the actress Ehmi Bessel from her liaison with the aviator general Ernst Udet. Shortly before the birth, her mother married the actor Werner Hinz. Dinah Hinz was the half-sister of the actors Michael Hinz and Knut Hinz.

Hinz grew up in Berlin and Hamburg and originally wanted to be an archaeologist. But Fritz Kortner discovered the 15-year-old student for the stage. During her training (1950/1951) at the Otto Falckenberg School in Munich, she also had engagements at the Residenztheater in Munich and at the Münchner Kammerspiele. Her first radio role occurred in 1962 and led to engagements in Hamburg, Hanover, Cologne, Berlin, Vienna and Zurich. Dinah Hinz has also been used on radio, radio play productions and often as a speaker for documentaries and features.

As a voice actress she lent inter alia. Carroll Baker (not mine), Elizabeth Taylor (Hotel International, phone Butterfield # 8) and Joanne Woodward (From the Terrace) their voices. In 2009 she celebrated her 60th anniversary on stage. In 2016 she was seen in the Quartetto by Ronald Harwood in a production by Hansgünther Heyme at the Hamburger Kammerspiele.

Her last major role in 2018 was that of Mathilde von Zahnd in the physicists of Friedrich Dürrenmatt in the theater "Die Färbe" in Singen, directed by Klaus Hemmerle. She had a final minor role in “Twenty on Selsky” that premiered in 2020.

Dinah Hinz lived in Zollikerberg near Zurich since 1962 [2]; she had a daughter and two grandchildren. She died in July 2020 at the age of 86 after a brief illness in Zurich.

== Filmography (selection) ==
- 1953: Regina Amstetten
- 1957: Kindermädchen für Papa gesucht
- 1957: Confessions of Felix Krull
- 1958: Bäume sterben aufrecht (TV film)
- 1960: Das Fenster zum Flur (TV film)
- 1960: Stahlnetz: E ... 605 (TV series episode)
- 1960: Schlager-Raketen
- 1963: Was soll werden, Harry? (TV film)
- 1963: Ein Phoenix zuviel (TV film)
- 1963: Das Kriminalmuseum: Die Fotokopie (TV series episode)
- 1967: Rheinsberg
- 1968: Morning's at Seven
- 1968: 24 Hour Lover
- 1970: Piggies (TV film)
- 1971: Geschäfte mit Plückhahn (TV film)
- 1972: Freizeitraum, Bau 2 (TV film)
- 1972: Der Kommissar: Fluchtwege (TV series episode)
- 1973: Hamburg Transit: Camping mit doppeltem Boden (TV series episode)
- 1974: Käpt'n Senkstakes Abenteuer: Ay, ay, Sheriff (TV series episode)
- 1975–1976: PS (TV series, 5 episodes)
- 1977: Anpassung an eine zerstörte Illusion (TV film)
- 1978: Stützen der Gesellschaft (TV film)
- 1978: St. Pauli-Landungsbrücken: Der Trick (TV series episode)
- 1979: Huckleberry Finn and His Friends (TV series)
- 1982: Ab in den Süden (TV film)
- 1987: Das andere Leben (TV film)
- 1989: Quicker Than the Eye
- 1991: Schwarz Rot Gold: Stoff (TV series episode)
- 1992: Tatort: Falsche Liebe (TV series episode)
- 1993: Tatort: Kesseltreiben (TV series episode)
- 1993: Jeanmaire – Ein Stück Schweiz (TV film)
- 1998: Spuren verschwinden – Nachträge ins europäische Gedächtnis (voice)

== Audiobook (selection) ==
- 1962: Richard Hughes: Gefahr – directed by Fritz Schröder-Jahn (Original-Hörspiel – NDR)
