= 4 Schlüssel =

1965 film

- Directed by: Jürgen Roland
- Written by: Max Pierre Schaeffer (novel)
- Starring: Walter Rilla; Günther Ungeheuer; Monika Peitsch; Hanns Lothar; Hellmut Lange; Joseph Offenbach; Heinz Engelmann
- Release date: 1965
- Country: West Germany
- Language: German

4 Schlüssel (English: The Four Keys) is a West German crime film directed by Jürgen Roland. It was released in 1965.

== Background ==
The film was shot in black and white and is based on a novel by Max Pierre Schaeffer. Schaeffer was inspired by a real incident that occurred in Switzerland, where it was common for bank vaults to require four separate keys held by trusted individuals. In the real case, a gang in Zurich forced a banker to summon all keyholders to his home. One of them grew suspicious and arrived with a detective, causing the gang to flee. During their escape, they shot and killed the banker.

Schaeffer’s story explores how the crime might have unfolded if the perpetrators had acted more intelligently. The film also examines how people react when threatened at gunpoint.

== Cast ==
- Günther Ungeheuer as Alexander Ford
- Walter Rilla as Bankdirektor Eduard Rose
- Monika Peitsch as Silvia Rose
- Hanns Lothar as Richard Hiss
- Hellmut Lange as Thilo
- Joseph Offenbach as Herr Wohlers
- Ida Krottendorf as Margarete Wohlers
- Paul Edwin Roth as Konrad von Brenken
- Ellen Schwiers as Irene Quinn
- Jürgen Draeger as Jensen
- Horst Michael Neutze as Charlie
- Heinz Engelmann as Kriminalkommissar
