= Peter Sandloff =

German composer

- Born: 3 July 1924; New York City, United States
- Died: 12 December 2009 (aged 85); Berlin, Germany
- Occupation: Composer
- Years active: 1951-1992 (film & TV)

Peter Sandloff (1924–2009) was an American-born German composer of television and film scores.

== Selected filmography ==
- Mädchen in Uniform (1958)
- We Cellar Children (1960)
- The Return of Doctor Mabuse (1961)
- Jeder stirbt für sich allein (1962)
- His Best Friend (1962)
- The Invisible Dr. Mabuse (1962)
- Aurora Marriage Bureau (1962)
- Life Begins at Eight (1962)
- The Lightship (1963)

== Bibliography ==
- Bergfelder, Tim. International Adventures: German Popular Cinema and European Co-Productions in the 1960s. Berghahn Books, 2005.
