= John Kling (TV series) =

- Also known as: John Klings Abenteuer
- Genre: Espionage
- Starring: Hellmut Lange; Uwe Friedrichsen
- Composer: Gerhard Narholz
- Country of origin: Germany
- Original language: German
- No. of seasons: 2
- No. of episodes: 26

Production
- Executive producer: Hans Kaden
- Camera setup: Michael Marszalek (First season); Josef Pávek (Second season)
- Running time: 30
- Production company: TV-Union

Original release
- Network: ZDF
- Release: October 13, 1965 – March 18, 1970

John Kling is the protagonist of a German TV series featuring a secret agent who tackles international missions all over the world. He works as detective for an American secret service, usually teaming up with his colleague and friend Jones Burthe (Uwe Friedrichsen).

== Background ==
John Kling was in the beginning a pulp fiction hero who was very successful as such from 1924 till 1939 and from 1949 till 1954. Based on those novels he eventually entered the TV screen where his 26 new adventures where broadcast in the late sixties.

While in pulp fiction he was a successor of Percy Stuart (whose first tale had already been released ten years before John Kling appeared), on TV he was his predecessor. Hans-Georg Thiemt directed this series before he directed Percy Stuart.

=== Season 1 (1965-1966) ===
№	Title	Air date
1	"Nachtexpress" (Night Express)	October 13, 1965
2	"Der Mann im Koffer" (The man in the suitcase)	October 20, 1965
3	"Der Fall Pünköschky" (The case Pünköschky)	October 27, 1965
4	"Der Täter ist bekannt" (The culprit is known)	November 3, 1965
5	"Vierundzwanzig Stunden Frist" (24 hours time limit)	November 10, 1965
6	"Schnee aus Frankreich" (Snow from France)	November 24, 1965
7	"Gefährliches Souvenir" (Dangerous keepsake)	December 1, 1965
8	"Das Attentat" (The attempt)	December 8, 1965
9	"Jagd auf die Katzenbande" (The „cat“ gang chase“)	December 15, 1965
10	"In geheimer Mission" (On a secret mission)	December 22, 1965
11	"Blüten" ( Counterfeit money)	December 29, 1965
12	"Die Kunstsammler" (The art collectors)	January 5, 1966
13	"Goldfische" (Goldfish)	January 12, 1966

=== Season 2 (1969-1970) ===
№	Title	Air date
1	"Geschäftsfreunde" (Business associates)	December 17, 1969
2	"Grüße aus dem Jenseits" (Greetings from the afterworld)	December 31, 1969
3	"Der Partisan" (The guerilla)	January 7, 1970
4	"Der Todeskandidat" (A doomed man)	January 14, 1970
5	"Das zweite Leben" (Second life)	January 21, 1970
6	"Auftrag wider Willen" (Unwanted mission)	January 28, 1970
7	"Tod in falschen Händen" (Death in wrong hands)	February 4, 1970
8	"Alpha vier" (Alpha 4)	February 11, 1970
9	"Die Seton-Story" (Seton's story)	February 18, 1970
10	"Der Urlaub mit Renate" (Holidays with Renate)	February 25, 1970
11	"Puppenspiele" (Puppet playing)	March 4, 1970
12	"Der blinde Hai" (The blind shark)	March 11, 1970
13	"Eine Braut für Mr. Burthe" (A bride for Mr Burthe)	March 18, 1970
