= Unser Walter =

- Starring: Cordula Trantow
- Country of origin: Germany

Unser Walter is a German television series.

== See also ==
- List of German television series
