= Hilfe! Hochzeit! – Die schlimmste Woche meines Lebens =

- Starring: Christoph Maria Herbst; Ulrike C. Tscharre; Uwe Friedrichsen
- Country of origin: Germany
- No. of seasons: 1
- No. of episodes: 7

Production
- Editors: Nicole Kortlüke; Andrea Mertens
- Running time: 21 minutes

Original release
- Network: Sat.1
- Release: 13 April 2007

Hilfe! Hochzeit! – Die schlimmste Woche meines Lebens is a German comedy television series directed by Isabel Kleefeld. It is based on the BBC series The Worst Week of My Life and was first broadcast on 13 April 2007 by the television channel Sat.1.

The programme stars celebrated comedy actor Christoph Maria Herbst as Joachim Witte and was produced by Brainpool.

== Cast ==
- Christoph Maria Herbst as Joachim Witte
- Ulrike C. Tscharre as Anna von Schanz
- Uwe Friedrichsen as Albrecht von Schanz
- Peggy Lukac as Sophia von Schanz

== See also ==
- List of German television series
