= Brian Freemantle =

English writer and journalist (1936–2024)

- Born: Brian Harry Freemantle; 10 June 1936; Southampton, Hampshire, England
- Died: 23 December 2024 (aged 88)
- Occupations: Writer, journalist
- Spouse: Maureen
- Children: 3 daughters
- Writing career
- Pen name: John Maxwell; Jonathan Evans; Jack Winchester; Richard Gant
- Language: English, Italian, Catalan and Hawaiian
- Period: 1973–2024
- Genre: Thriller
- Subjects: Biography; Espionage; True crime
- Notable work: Charlie Muffin novels

Brian Harry Freemantle (10 June 1936 – 23 December 2024) was an English thriller and non-fiction writer, known for his 1977 spy novel Charlie Muffin.

== Life and career ==
Freemantle was born in Southampton. He also published using the pseudonyms John Maxwell, Jonathan Evans, Jack Winchester and Richard Gant. He was a Freeman of the City of London.

Until 1975, when he became a full-time writer, he was a foreign correspondent and editor for various newspapers, including the Daily Mail and the Daily Sketch. In April that year, he organised the sole British-led airlift rescue of South Vietnamese civilians during the Fall of Saigon, assisting in the evacuation of 100 orphans, of whom Viktoria Cowley was one, aged approximately 18 months.

In 1989, Brian appeared in the television documentary Borders, alongside Michio Kaku, Steve Buscemi, Margaret Randall, and Robert Anton Wilson. In his interview, he discusses transnational crime, border security, narcotics smuggling, and his experiences being banned from the former Czechoslovakia and Soviet Union.

Brian and Viktoria, now a grown adult, have been featured in a few documentaries together, the first being BBC One – The Airmail Orphan. He later made a promotional film for his own books, Open Road Media, in which Viktoria appeared. In another documentary from BBC One Northern Ireland, Viktoria introduces another Vietnamese adoptee from the flight to Brian. On 28 March 2018, they both appeared on BBC's The One Show talking about the airlift, adoption and Vietnam.

Viktoria's son is named Harry, Brian's middle name, in recognition of Operation Babylift on 6 April 1975. Viktoria and Brian were in regular contact after they first met in 2010; she is the first Vietnamese adoptee Brian has met and the only adoptee he remained in contact with. She told him, "You saved my life and those of every other child. On their behalf, and my own, I thank you."

Freemantle died from Parkinson's disease on 23 December 2024, at the age of 88.

== Bibliography ==
=== Standalone novels ===
- Goodbye to an Old Friend (1973)
- Face Me When You Walk Away (1974)
- The Man Who Wanted Tomorrow (1975)
- The November Man (1976)
- The Vietnam Legacy (1984)
- The Lost American (1984)
- Rules of Engagement (1984) (Originally written as The Vietnam Legacy in 1984)
- Deaken's War (1985) (Originally written as Jack Winchester in 1982)
- The Kremlin Kiss (1986) (Originally written as The Lost American in 1984)
- Dirty White (1986) (Originally written as Jonathan Evans, The Laundryman (1985))
- The Choice of Eddie Franks (1987) (Originally written as Jack Winchester in 1986)
- The Bearpit (1988)
- Betrayals (1989)
- The Factory (1990) [SS]
- O'Farrell's Law (1990)
- Little Grey Mice (1991)
- Kremlin Conspiracy (1997) (Originally written as Jonathan Evans, Monopoly (1984))
- At Any Price (1998) (Originally written as Jonathan Evans, chairman of the board (1982))
- Gold (1998) (Originally written as Jonathan Evans, The Midas Men (1981))
- The Iron Cage (1999) (Originally written as Jack Winchester, The Solitary Man (1980))
- Washington White (1999)
- Target (2000)
- Hell's Paradise (2001) (Originally written as John Maxwell, HMS Bounty in 1977)
- Ice Age (2002)
- Two Women (2003)
- Dead End (2004)
- To Save a Son (2006) (Originally written as Jack Winchester, The Choice of Eddie Franks in 1986)
- Time to Kill (2006)
- The Namedropper (2007)
- The Cloud Collector: A Thriller (2015)

=== Charlie M/Muffin novels ===
Charlie Muffin, English spy, contends with the Russians and his superiors during the Cold War and moving to modern times. The disheveled, slow-moving anti-hero has the wits to win, sometimes.

- Charlie Muffin (1977) a.k.a. Charlie M.
- Clap Hands, Here Comes Charlie (1978) a.k.a. Here Comes Charlie M
- The Inscrutable Charlie Muffin (1979)
- Charlie Muffin's Uncle Sam (1980) a.k.a. Charlie Muffin U.S.A.
- Madrigal for Charlie Muffin (1981)
- Charlie Muffin and Russian Rose (1985) a.k.a. The Blind Run
- Charlie Muffin San (1987) a.k.a. See Charlie Run
- The Run Around (1988)
- Comrade Charlie (1989)
- Charlie's Apprentice (1993)
- Charlie's Chance (1996) a.k.a. Bomb Grade
- Charlie's Choice: The First Charlie Muffin Omnibus (1997)
- Dead Men Living (2000)
- Kings of Many Castles (2001)
- Red Star Rising (2010)
- Red Star Burning (2012)
- Red Star Falling (2013)

=== Cowley and Danilov Series ===
U.S. FBI agent teams with Russian policeman solving cases from murder to terrorism, always with international implications. More procedural than who-done-it.

- The Button Man (1992), reissued 2011 as In the Name of a Killer
- No Time for Heroes (1994)
- The Watchmen (2002)
- Triple Cross (2004)

=== Non-fiction ===
- KGB: Inside the World's Largest Intelligence Network (1982)
- CIA: The 'Honourable' Company (1983)
- The Fix: Inside the World Drug Trade (1986)
- The Steal: Counterfeiting and Industrial Espionage (1987)
- The Octopus: Europe in the Grip of Organized Crime (1995)

=== As Harry Asher ===
- The Predators (1988)

=== As Richard Gant ===
- Ian Fleming: Man with the Golden Pen (1966) a.k.a. Ian Fleming: The Fantastic 007 Man
- Sean Connery, Gilt-Edged Bond (1967)
- The Touchables (1968)

=== As Andrea Hart ===
- A Mind to Kill (1998)
- The Return (1999)

=== As John Maxwell ===
- H.M.S. Bounty (1977) a.k.a. Hell's Fire (2011)
- The Mary Celeste (1979)

=== As Jack Winchester ===
- Deaken's War (1982)
