= Hanns Lothar =

German actor

- Born: Hans Lothar Neutze; 10 April 1929; Hannover, Germany
- Died: 11 March 1967 (aged 37); Hamburg, West Germany
- Occupation: Actor
- Years active: 1948–1966

Hanns Lothar (born Hans Lothar Neutze; 10 April 1929 – 11 March 1967) was a German film actor. He appeared in 36 films between 1948 and 1966. He was born in Hannover, Germany and died in Hamburg, West Germany. He was the father of actress Susanne Lothar.

Lothar remains perhaps best known to international audiences as Schlemmer, James Cagney's devoted German assistant, in Billy Wilder's comedy One, Two, Three (1961). He died suddenly from renal colic problems aged 37.

== Filmography ==
Year	Title	Role	Notes
1948	Paths in Twilight		
1951	The Guilt of Doctor Homma	Reporter	Uncredited
1959	People in the Net	Stefan	
1959	The Buddenbrooks	Christian Buddenbrook	part 1, 2
1960	Storm in a Water Glass	Hans Burdach	
1960	Sacred Waters	Thöni Grieg	
1960	The Last Witness	Lawyer Dr. Fox	
1961	One, Two, Three	Schlemmer	
1961	Girl from Hong Kong	Kuddel Bratt	
1962	Wenn beide schuldig werden	Richard Goetz	
1962	Seelenwanderung	Axel	TV film
1963	Wochentags immer	Felix	
1963	Gripsholm Castle	Karlchen	
1963	Piccadilly Zero Hour 12	Jack Bellamy	
1964	Flug in Gefahr	George Spencer	TV film
1964	Polizeirevier Davidswache	Bellkamp	
1965	Der Fall Harry Domela	Harry Domela	TV film
1965	Die Katze im Sack	Vic Malloy	TV film
1966	4 Schlüssel	Richard Hiss	
1966	Long Legs, Long Fingers	Emile Cavin	
