= Hellmut Lange =

German actor (1923–2011)

Hellmut Lange (19 January 1923 – 13 January 2011) was an actor and journalist who became famous as an action hero on TV and eventually succeeded as presenter on popular TV show Kennen Sie Kino? or Do You Know Film?

== Acting career ==
Hellmut Lange started his acting career on radio drama shows for the West German Radio Station Sender Freies Berlin also known as Radio Free Berlin. After finishing his schooling he studied acting for two years in Hanover and then he worked as a stage actor in Munich. In the early fifties he played Old Shatterhand on an open air stage.

After starring in several made for television films, he was the principal actor in The Forger of London a German Edgar Wallace adaption for cinema. The next year he had one of the main roles in a TV mini series based on a story by Francis Durbridge. He also acted as the secret agent protagonist the TV series John Kling.

He played Natty Bumppo in a European miniseries based on James Fenimore Cooper's Leatherstocking Tales. Later he appeared in Patton (1969).

He was the German voice for Richard Harris, Charlton Heston, Paul Newman and other American stars for the German dubbed versions of their feature films.

Lederstrumpf and John Kling's Abenteuer had just been digitally remastered and released on DVD.

== Career as a journalist ==
Due to his background in acting and film, Lange wrote articles about cinema. He was also a presenter on German Television on the quiz program Kennen Sie Kino? which ran from 1971 to 1981.

== Retirement ==
Lange worked successfully as an actor on TV until he was over seventy years old. In 2009, serious health issues hindered him from continuing.

== Selected filmography ==
=== Film ===
- Ordered to Love (1961), as Oberscharführer Nietermann
- The Forger of London (1961), as Peter Clifton
- The Sand Runs Red (1962), as Harald Birk
- Barras heute (1963), as Leutnant Junkermann
- Murder in Rio (1963), as Peter Jordan
- A Man in His Prime (1964), as Ferrow
- Serenade for Two Spies (1965), as John Krim
- 4 Schlüssel (1966), as Thilo
- Two Girls from the Red Star (1966), as Harry Miller
- Operation Yellow Viper (1966), as Claus van Dongen
- Diamond Safari (1966), as Robert Alphène
- Girls, Girls (1967), as Ernst
- The Blonde from Peking (1967), as Malik
- Love Nights in the Taiga (1967), as Captain Jimmy Braddock
- Patton (1970), as Major Dorian von Haarenwege (uncredited)
- Knife in the Back (1975), as Untersuchungsrichter
- Das Gesetz des Clans (1977), as Gordon Hamilton
- Hitler: A Film from Germany (1977), as Hitlers Kammerdiener / Goebbels-Puppenspieler / SS-Mann
- Miko: From the Gutter to the Stars (1986), as Television presenter

=== Television ===
- Der Tod des Sokrates (1957), as Kriton
- Stahlnetz: Mordfall Oberhausen (1958, TV series episode), as Kriminalkommissar Mattern
- Johnny Belinda (1961, based on Johnny Belinda), as Dr. Jack Roberts
- Anruf am Abend (1961), as Harry Clayton
- Das Halstuch (1962, TV miniseries), as Edward Collins
- Laura (1962, based on Laura), as Mark McPherson
- Der Belagerungszustand (1963, based on The State of Siege), as Diego
- Die fünfte Kolonne: Das gelbe Paket (1963, TV series episode), as Ted Richter
- Stahlnetz: Strandkorb 421 (1964, TV series episode), as Gustav Streuner
- John Kling (1965–1970, TV series), as John Kling
- The Investigation (1966, based on The Investigation), as Stark
- Stahlnetz: Der fünfte Mann (1966, TV series episode), as Kriminalhauptkommissar Helmut Meyer
- Treasure Island (1966, TV miniseries), as Narrator (voice)
- Heydrich in Prag (1967), as Jindra
- Sieben Wochen auf dem Eis (1967), as Baldizzone
- König Richard II (1968, based on Richard II), as Northumberland
- Von Mäusen und Menschen (1968, based on Of Mice and Men), as Slim
- Kennen Sie Kino? (1968–1984, TV game show)
- The Last of the Mohicans (1969, TV miniseries), as Natty Bumppo
- Salto Mortale (1969–1972, TV series, 14 episodes), as Mischa
- Der Kommissar: Blinde Spiele (1972, TV series episode), as Dr. Gerd Kerrut
- Eurogang (1975–1976, TV series, 6 episodes), as Hauptkommissar Karl Hager
- The Old Fox: Nachtmusik (1978, TV series episode), as Gregor Kerner
- Tatort: Der Schläfer (1983, TV series episode), as Wellmann
- Mandara (1983, TV miniseries), as Pastor Petersen
- Rivalen der Rennbahn (1989, TV series, 11 episodes), as Wolf Kremer
- Fähre in den Tod (1996, TV film), as Herwegh

=== German-language Dubbing ===
- Richard Harris (Zachary Bass), in Man in the Wilderness (1971)
- James Coburn (Jim McCabe), in Sky Riders (1976)
- Charlton Heston (Captain Matthew Garth), in Midway (1976)
- Donald Sutherland (Frank Lansing), in Bear Island (1979)
- Roy Scheider (Officer Frank Murphy), in Blue Thunder (1983)
- Paul Newman (Walter Bridge), in Mr. and Mrs. Bridge (1990)
