= The Last Escape (1970 film) =

1970 film by Walter Grauman

- Theatrical release poster
- Directed by: Walter Grauman
- Written by: John C. Champion; Hermann Hoffman
- Produced by: Irving Temaner
- Starring: Stuart Whitman; John Collin; Martin Jarvis; Margit Saad
- Cinematography: Gernot Roll
- Edited by: Peter Elliott; Bud Molin
- Music by: John Kander
- Production company: Oakmont Productions
- Distributed by: United Artists
- Release date: May 6, 1970
- Running time: 90 minutes
- Countries: United States; West Germany
- Language: English

The Last Escape, also known as O.S.S., is a 1970 war film directed by Walter Grauman and starring Stuart Whitman, John Collin and Martin Jarvis. It was filmed by Oakmont Productions for Mirisch Productions near Munich in 1968 but not released until 1970.

Interiors were shot at the Bavaria Studios in Munich. The film's sets were designed by the art director Rolf Zehetbauer.

== Plot ==
During the Second World War, American Captain Lee Mitchell (Stuart Whitman) and a group of British commandos attempt to locate and kidnap the leading German rocket scientist Dr. Von Heinken (Pinkas Braun). Along the way they are chased by SS and Soviet forces who were also after him.

== Cast ==
- Stuart Whitman as Capt. Lee Mitchell
- John Collin as Sgt. Henry McBee
- Martin Jarvis as Lt. Donald Wilcox
- Pinkas Braun as Dr. Von Heinken
- Günther Neutze as Maj. Hessel
- Margit Saad as Karen Gerhardt
- Patrick Jordan as Maj. Griggs
- Johnny Briggs as Cpl. O'Connell
- Harald Dietl as Maj. Petrov
- Gerd Vespermann as Blucher
- Andy Pap as Curt
- Andrew Lodge as Gregory
- David Albert Taylor as Morse
- Richard Abbott as Billings
- Paul Bentley as Jarvis

== Novelization ==
A paperback novelization of the screenplay was written by the ubiquitous and popular pulpsmith, Michael Avallone, under the publisher's "house" (shared) pseudonym, "Max Walker." (Contrary to any other assertion, this is the only time Avallone's work was published under the Walker by-line.) The publisher was Popular Library and the cover price was 60¢.

== See also ==
- List of American films of 1970
- Operation Paperclip
