= Piccadilly Zero Hour 12 =

1963 film

- Directed by: Rudolf Zehetgruber
- Written by: Francis Durbridge; Rudolf Zehetgruber
- Produced by: Eberhard Meichsner
- Starring: Helmut Wildt
- Cinematography: Hans Jura
- Edited by: Liselotte Cochius
- Release date: 31 December 1963
- Country: West Germany
- Language: German

Piccadilly Zero Hour 12 (German: Piccadilly null Uhr zwölf) is a 1963 West German crime film directed by Rudolf Zehetgruber and starring Helmut Wildt.

== Cast ==
- Helmut Wildt - Mike Hilton
- Hanns Lothar - Jack Bellamy
- Ann Smyrner - Ruth Morgan
- Klaus Kinski - Whitey
- Karl Lieffen - Lee Costello
- Pinkas Braun - Sir Cunningham
- Ilja Richter - Edgar
- Marlene Warrlich - Della
- Camilla Spira - Pamela
- Rudolf Fernau - Craddock
- Stanislav Ledinek - Sammy
- Albert Bessler
- Dieter Eppler - Slatterly
