= The Lightship (1963 film) =

1963 film

- Directed by: Ladislao Vajda
- Written by: Siegfried Lenz (story); Curt Siodmak
- Produced by: Roberto Amoroso; Hermann Schwerin; Hans Wolff
- Starring: James Robertson Justice; Helmut Wildt; Dieter Borsche
- Cinematography: Heinz Pehlke
- Edited by: Hermann Ludwig
- Music by: Peter Sandloff
- Production company: Fono Film
- Distributed by: Columbia-Bavaria Film
- Release date: 5 March 1963
- Running time: 84 minutes
- Country: West Germany
- Language: German

The Lightship (German: Das Feuerschiff) is a 1963 West German thriller film directed by Ladislao Vajda and starring James Robertson Justice, Helmut Wildt, and Dieter Borsche. It is based on a story by Siegfried Lenz, which was adapted again as the 1985 film The Lightship.

The film's sets were designed by the art director Johannes Ott. It was shot at the Tempelhof Studios in Berlin and on location in Copenhagen and Malmö.

== Cast ==
- James Robertson Justice as Kapitän Freytag
- Helmut Wildt as Dr. Caspary
- Dieter Borsche as Steuermann Rethorn
- Pinkas Braun as Funker Philippi
- Michael Hinz as Fred Freytag
- Georg Lehn as Gombert
- Günter Mack as Zumpe
- Simon Martin as Martin
- Werner Peters as Trittel
- Sieghardt Rupp as Eugen
- Wolfgang Völz
- Xavier Cugat
- Aldo Fabrizi
- Abbe Lane

== Bibliography ==
- Goble, Alan (1999). The Complete Index to Literary Sources in Film. Walter de Gruyter. ISBN 978-3-11-095194-3.
