= Helmut Wildt =

German actor

- Born: 9 April 1922; Bad Pyrmont, Lower Saxony, Germany
- Died: 4 October 2007 (aged 85); Berlin, Germany
- Occupation: Actor
- Years active: 1958-1994 (film & TV)
- Spouse: Bettina Schön

Helmut Wildt (9 April 1922 – 4 October 2007) was a German stage, film and television actor.

== Selected filmography ==
- Black Gravel (1961)
- Life Begins at Eight (1962)
- The Lightship (1963)
- Piccadilly Zero Hour 12 (1963)
- The Dirty Game (1965)
