= Ladyland =

- Starring: Anke Engelke
- Country of origin: Germany

Ladyland is a German television show. The premiere episode on March 20, 2006, saw 1.56 million viewers with a market share of 7.9 percent. In the group of 14 to 49-year-olds, 900,000 viewers watched the show (market share: 10.6%).

== See also ==
- List of German television series
