= Jack and Jenny =

1963 film

- Directed by: Victor Vicas
- Written by: Anne Piper (novel Early to Bed); Kurt Nachmann; Thomas Keck; Peter Loos
- Produced by: Werner M. Lenz; Gero Wecker
- Starring: Brett Halsey; Senta Berger; Michael Hinz
- Cinematography: Werner M. Lenz
- Edited by: Margot Jahn; Ira Oberberg
- Music by: Paul Misraki
- Production companies: Arca-Film; Winston Films Corporation
- Distributed by: Nora-Filmverleih
- Release date: 25 December 1963
- Running time: 86 minutes
- Country: West Germany
- Language: German

Jack and Jenny (German: Jack und Jenny) is a 1963 West German comedy film directed by Victor Vicas and starring Brett Halsey, Senta Berger and Michael Hinz.

The film's sets were designed by the art director Ernst H. Albrecht. Location filming took place in Italy and Thailand.

== Cast ==
- Brett Halsey as Jack
- Senta Berger as Jenny
- Michael Hinz as Josef Lancelot
- Marion Michael as Betsy
- Eckart Dux as Eduard
- Paul Klinger as Jonas
- Ivan Desny as Wladimir
- Friedrich Joloff as Victor
- Michael Verhoeven as Timothy
- Harry Liebauer as Lancelot
- Udo Kämper as Pierre
- Erich Fiedler as Onkel Baldwin
- Olga Chekhova as Mutter Johannsen
- Katja Tisar as Fräulein Bauer
- Gisela Fritsch as Magda
- Claude Farell as Barbara
- Karola Kyrath as Marina
- Beate Hasenau as Helga
- Brigitte Mira as Thea
- Barbara Saade
- Alexander Kerst

== Bibliography ==
- Bock, Hans-Michael & Bergfelder, Tim. The Concise CineGraph. Encyclopedia of German Cinema. Berghahn Books, 2009.
