= Cordula Trantow =

German actress and director (1942–2026)

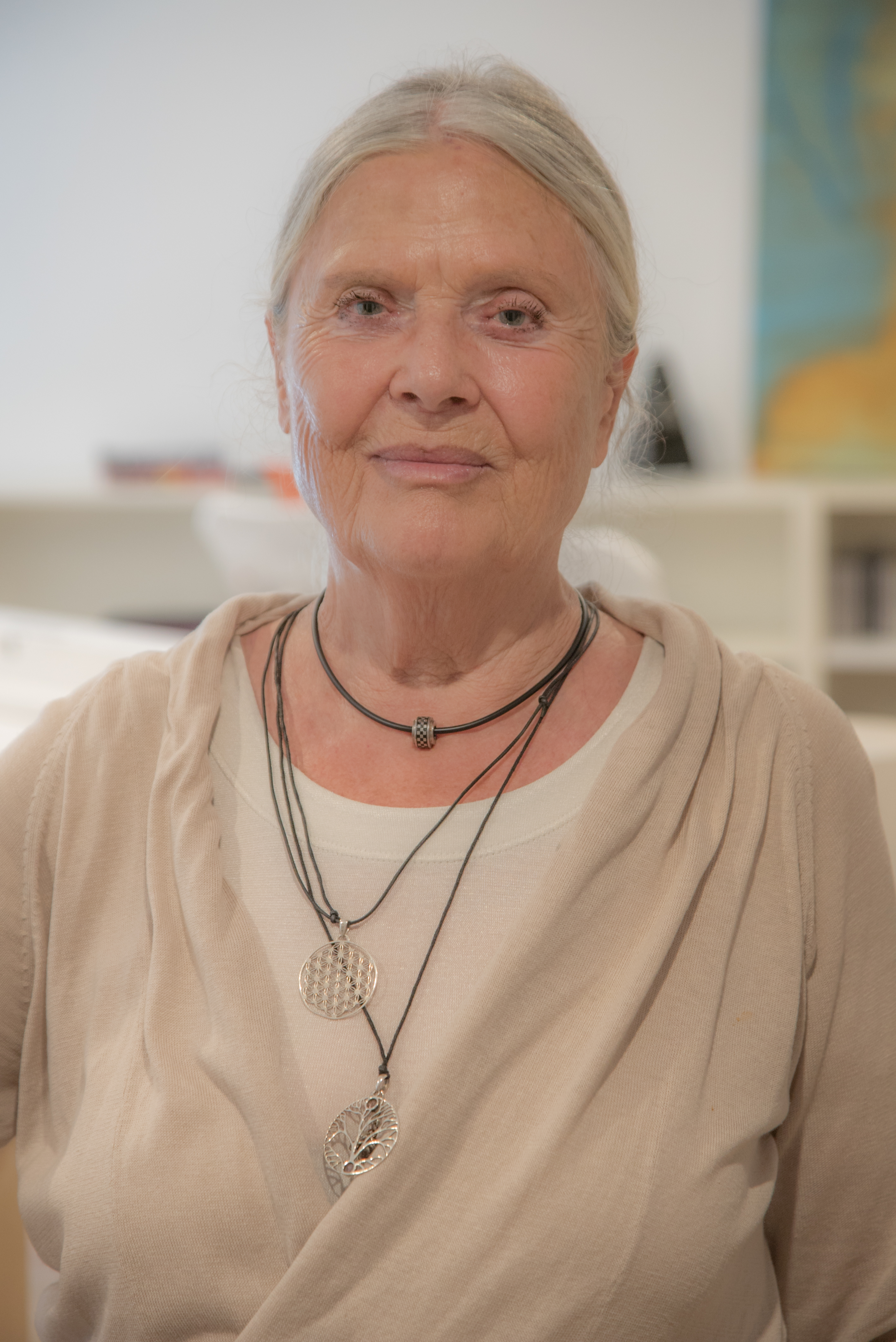
Trantow in 2020

Cordula Trantow (29 December 1942 – 12 August 2026) was a German actress and director.

== Career ==
Trantow started acting in the 1950s and achieved international recognition already as a teenager for her role as Franziska in the 1959 Golden-Globe-winning anti-war film Die Brücke. Her performance in the 1962 Hollywood film Hitler, in which she portrayed Hitler's niece Geli Raubal, earned her a nomination for the Golden Globe Award for Most Promising Newcomer – Female.

She subsequently received other offers from Hollywood, but turned away from a possible career there and concentrated on theatre and television in Germany. She appeared at theatres including the Bayerisches Staatsschauspiel in Munich and the Württembergisches Staatstheater Stuttgart, and later worked as a director. She also founded the Weilheimer Theatersommer. Her television work included appearances in crime series such as Derrick and Der Alte.

Trantow was also active in voice acting, lending her voice to Ali MacGraw in the German versions of Love Story and The Getaway, among other people. She was active as an actress well into the 2020s.

== Personal life and death ==
Her father was the film composer and conductor Herbert Trantow. She was married to the director Rudolf Noelte and also appeared in his 1968 Franz Kafka adaption The Castle.

Trantow died on 12 August 2026, at the age of 83, after a short illness.

== Selected filmography ==
- Mischief in Wonderland (1957)
- Die Brücke (1959)
- Boomerang (1960)
- Tomorrow Is My Turn (1960)
- Sacred Waters (1960)
- Only the Wind (1961)
- Our Town (1961, TV film)
- Hitler (1962)
- Bekenntnisse eines möblierten Herrn (1963)
- Babeck (1968; TV miniseries)
- The Castle (1968)
- Dem Täter auf der Spur (1970; TV series)
- Unser Walter (1974; TV miniseries)
- The Garbage Dump (1975; TV film)
- Haus der Frauen (1977; TV film)
- Tatort: Freund Gregor (1979; TV series)
- Preußische Nacht (1981; TV film)
- Käthe Kollwitz (1985; TV film)
- Derrick: Das Floß (1994; TV series)
- Bella Block: Hinter den Spiegeln (2004; TV series)
- Greed (2010; TV film)
