= Pinkas Braun =

Swiss actor (1923–2008)

- Born: 7 January 1923; Zürich, Switzerland
- Died: 24 June 2008 (aged 85); Munich, Germany
- Occupation: Actor
- Years active: 1954–2002

Pinkas Braun (7 January 1923 – 24 June 2008) was a Swiss film actor. He appeared in 70 films between 1952 and 2002. He was born in Zürich, Switzerland and died in Munich, Germany.

== Partial filmography ==
- Sky Without Stars (1955) - Kommissar Engelbrecht
- Wir Wunderkinder (1958) - Siegfried Stein
- The Miracle of Father Malachia (1961) - Christian Krüger
- The Puzzle of the Red Orchid (1962) - Edwin
- The Door with Seven Locks (1962) - Dr. Antonio Staletti
- The Curse of the Yellow Snake (1963) - Fing-Su / St. Clay
- The Lightship (1963) - Funker Philippi
- Piccadilly Zero Hour 12 (1963) - Sir Reginald Cunningham
- Mark of the Tortoise (1964) - Felix
- Dog Eat Dog (1964) - Livio Morelli
- Das Haus auf dem Hügel (1964) - Roger Marton, Antiquitätenhändler
- Black Eagle of Santa Fe (1965) - Gentleman
- City of Fear (1965) - Ferenc
- St. Pauli Herbertstraße (1965) - Werner Kästel
- Secret Agent Super Dragon (1966) - (uncredited)
- The Investigation (1966, TV film) - Witness
- The Hunchback of Soho (1966) - Alan Davis
- Clint the Stranger (1967) - Don Shannon
- Mission Stardust (1967) - Arkin
- The Man Outside (1967) - Rafe Machek
- Der Tod läuft hinterher (1967, TV Mini-Series) - John Evans
- Im Banne des Unheimlichen (1968) - The Stranger
- Jacques Offenbach – Ein Lebensbild (1969, TV Movie) - Jacques Offenbach
- Hotel Royal (1969, TV film) - Deval
- The Last Escape (1970) - Von Heinken
- The Woman in White (1971, TV Mini-Series) - Sir Percival Glyde
- Wenn ihr wollt, ist es kein Märchen (1973, TV Movie) - Theodor Herzl
- Derrick (1976–1986, TV Series) - Dr. Kroll / Dr. Bergmann
- Jeder stirbt für sich allein (1976) - Widerstandskämpfer Der Dunkle
- Bloodline (1979) - Dr. Wal
- Charlie Muffin (1979, TV Movie) - Valery Kalenin
- L'ombre rouge (1981) - Maly
- All Fired Up (1982) - Monsieur Nash
- The Tiger Brigades (1982–1983, TV Series) - Gabrielli
- Les Cavaliers de l'orage (1984) - Col. Debars
- Falosny princ (1985) - Hlavný vezír
- Friedenspolka (1987, TV Movie) - Joseph Grey
- Anna Göldin, letzte Hexe (1991) - Pfarrer Camerarius
- Die Zeit danach (1992)
- Mr. Bluesman (1993) - Hormann
- K (1997) - Joseph Katz / Karl Heinrich
- Komiker (2000) - Max
- Verzauberte Emma oder Hilfe, ich bin ein Junge... ! (2002) - Albert Tartov
