= Uwe Friedrichsen =

German actor

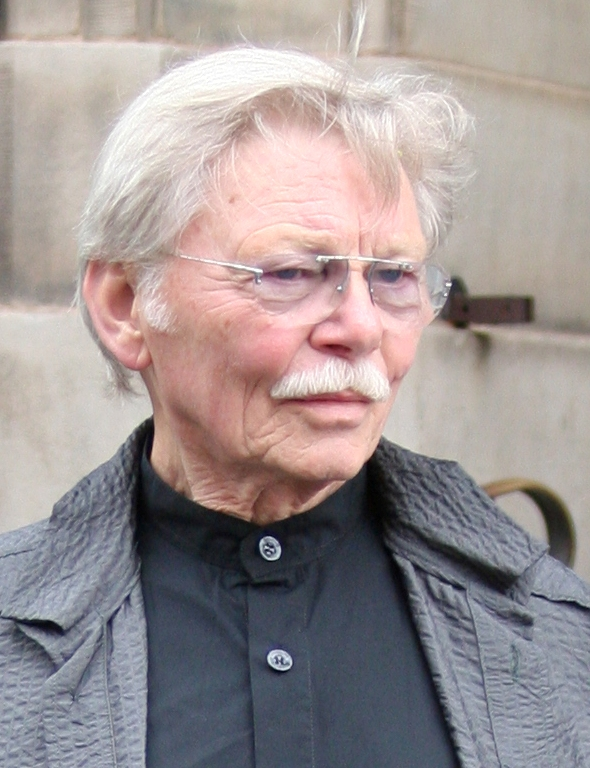
Uwe Friedrichsen, 2010

Uwe Friedrichsen (27 May 1934, in Altona – 30 April 2016, in Hamburg) was a German television actor.

== Filmography ==
Year	Title	Role	Notes
1957	Lemke's Widow	Jochen	
1957	The Unexcused Hour	Hans Oblatek, Student	
1959	The Night Before the Premiere	Policeman	
1960	Faust	Student	
1961	Our House in Cameroon	Rolf Ambrock	
1964	No Survivors, Please	Howard Moore	
1965–1970	John Kling	Jones Burthe	TV series, 26 episodes
1968	The Gorilla of Soho	Sgt. Jim Pepper	
1969	The Rats	Bruno Mechelke	TV film
1970	Maximilian von Mexiko	General Mejia	TV film
1971	Einer spinnt immer	Uwe Falk	
1971	The Love Keys	Dr. Walter Bertram	
1977	Operation Ganymed	Steve	TV film
1980	Sesamstraße	Uwe	TV series
1982–1996	Schwarz Rot Gold	Zollamtsrat Hans Zaluskowski	TV series, 18 episodes
1983	The Roaring Fifties	Monsieur Chanson	
1984	So ein Theater	Uwe	TV film
1992–1993	Oppen & Ehrlich	Heinrich Oppen	TV series, 16 episodes
1992	Go Trabi Go 2 – Das war der wilde Osten	Bürgermeister Kuhn	
1998	The King of St. Pauli	Senator Vieting	TV miniseries
2002	Die fabelhaften Schwestern	Albert	TV film
2007	Hilfe! Hochzeit! – Die schlimmste Woche meines Lebens	Albrecht von Schanz	TV series, 7 episodes
2012	Victor and the Secret of Crocodile Mansion	Herr Opitz	

=== Voice acting / Dubbing ===
Year	Title	Role	Actor
1962	Treasure of Silver Lake	Großer Wolf	Jozo Kovačević
1966	Die Rechnung – eiskalt serviert	Caruso	Ilija Ivezić
1971	The Vampire Happening	Jens Larsen	Thomas Hunter
