= Rudolf Noelte =

German director (1921–2002)

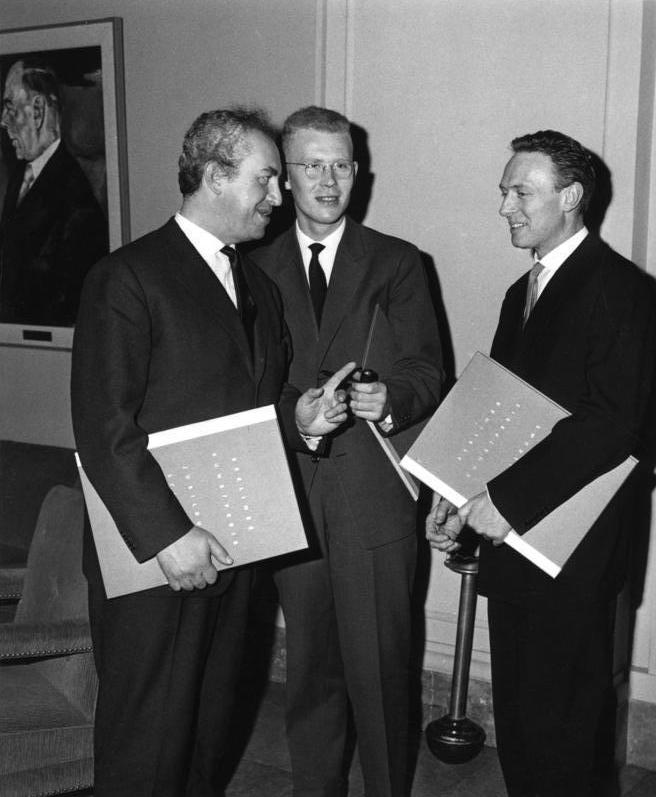
- Noelte (left), Uwe Johnson, Erich Schellow (1960)
- Born: 21 March 1921; Berlin
- Died: 8 November 2002 (aged 81); Garmisch-Partenkirchen
- Occupation: Film director
- Years active: 1967–1985

Rudolf Noelte (21 March 1921 – 8 November 2002) was a German film director, theater director and opera director.

== Filmography ==
=== Film ===
- The Castle (1968, based on The Castle)

=== Television ===
- Pygmalion (1957, based on Pygmalion)
- Draußen vor der Tür (1957, based on The Man Outside)
- Abendstunde im Spätherbst (1960, based on Abendstunde im Spätherbst by Friedrich Dürrenmatt)
- Die Kassette (1961, based on a play by Carl Sternheim)
- Die Wildente (1961, based on The Wild Duck)
- König Ödipus (1963, based on Oedipus Rex)
- Maria Magdalena (1963, based on Maria Magdalena by Christian Friedrich Hebbel)
- Das Band (1963, based on Bandet by August Strindberg)
- Der Kammersänger (1964, based on a play by Frank Wedekind)
- Irrungen, Wirrungen (1966, based on Irrungen, Wirrungen by Theodor Fontane)
- Drei Schwestern (1966, based on Three Sisters)
- Die Fliegen (1966, based on The Flies)
- Woyzeck (1966, based on Woyzeck)
- Der zerbrochene Krug (1967, based on The Broken Jug)
- Der Kirschgarten (1970, based on The Cherry Orchard)
- Der Menschenfeind (1976, based on The Misanthrope)
- Der Todestanz (1977, based on The Dance of Death)
- Die Ratten (1977, based on The Rats)
- Die Wildente (1981, based on The Wild Duck)
- Dantons Tod (1981, based on Danton's Death)
- Elisabeth von England (1983, based on a play by Ferdinand Bruckner)
- Michael Kramer (1984, based on Michael Kramer by Gerhart Hauptmann)
- Schluck und Jau (1985, based on Schluck und Jau by Gerhart Hauptmann)
