= Hannes Messemer =

German actor (1924–1991)

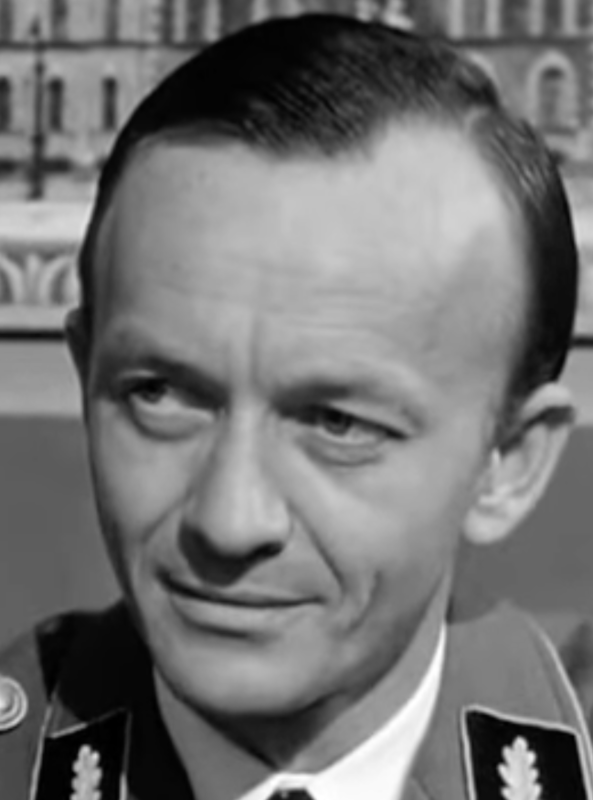
- Messemer in General della Rovere (1959)
- Born: Hans Edwin Messemer; 17 May 1924; Dillingen an der Donau, Bavaria, Germany
- Died: 2 November 1991 (aged 67); Aachen, North Rhine-Westphalia, Germany
- Occupation: Actor
- Years active: 1956–1991
- Known for: The Great Escape
- Spouses: Monika Kreusch (m. 1985) Susanne Korda (1980–1981) (divorced): Rosl Schäfer (1952–1977) (divorced) [1 child]

Hannes Messemer (17 May 1924 – 2 November 1991) was a German actor from Dillingen an der Donau, Bavaria.

== Biography ==
=== World War II ===
Messemer served on the Eastern Front of World War II and was eventually captured by Soviet soldiers and was held as a POW in Soviet Russia. He managed to escape and made it back to Germany on foot, walking hundreds of miles to the German border. He was wounded by Soviet gunfire, but was not recaptured by the Soviets. He surrendered to British forces and then, spent two years in a POW facility in London, known as the "London Cage".

=== Acting career ===
After the war, Messemer tried his hand at several jobs, before falling into acting in 1946. With only his natural talent and no training, he successfully secured roles with several major theatre companies in: Tübingen, Hamburg, Munich and Berlin in the following ten years.

His big break in films came with a role in Rose Bernd in 1956. He was then cast in the major role of Colonel Rossdorf in the production of The Devil Strikes at Night the following year - a role which saw him awarded a Best Actor accolade. A series of successful roles followed, including: The Doctor of Stalingrad, Der Transport (Destination Death), Die Brücke des Schicksals and the comedy Babette Goes to War with Brigitte Bardot. He achieved critical international acclaim for his role as Colonel Muller in the Roberto Rossellini production of General della Rovere (1959), with the film winning the Golden Lion at Venice that year.

Messemer is probably best known for his role as Oberst von Luger, the Kommandant in The Great Escape (1963).

He continued to star in TV and theatre productions, becoming a familiar face to German television audiences for over 20 years. Some of his roles included major TV productions, such as Union der festen Hand and Die Dämonen, as well as two years as Commissioner Deeds in the TV drama series Sergeant Berry. He also lent his distinctive voice to radio and recorded works, including the writings of Mao, and a reading of the four books of the Gospels.

=== Personal life ===
He was married four times and had two daughters.

=== Illness and death ===
A lifelong heavy smoker and drinker, Messemer suffered throat cancer during the 1980s, and surgery left his voice at only a whisper. Forced to retire from acting, he appeared on West German television for the last time in 1989, in a production with Agnes Fink. He died of a heart attack in Aachen on 2 November 1991, aged 67.

== Filmography ==
=== Film ===
Year	Title	Role	Director	Notes
1957	Rose Bernd	August Keil	Wolfgang Staudte	
1957	The Devil Strikes at Night	SS-Gruppenführer Rossdorf	Robert Siodmak	
1957	The Glass Tower	Dr. Krell	Harald Braun	
1958	Escape from Sahara	Robert Altmann	Wolfgang Staudte	
1958	The Doctor of Stalingrad	Oberleutnant Pjotr Markow	Géza von Radványi	
1958	Taiga	Roeder	Wolfgang Liebeneiner	
1959	Twelve Hours By the Clock	Serge	Géza von Radványi	
1959	People in the Net	Braun	Franz Peter Wirth	
1959	Babette Goes to War	General Franz von Arenberg	Christian-Jaque	
1959	General Della Rovere	SS-Standartenführer Müller	Roberto Rossellini	
1959	Ein Tag, der nie zu Ende geht	Bill Robson	Franz Peter Wirth	
1960	The High Life	Ernst Moos	Julien Duvivier	
1960	Escape by Night	Oberst von Kleist	Roberto Rossellini	
1960	Die Brücke des Schicksals	Klaus Urban	Michael Kehlmann	
1960	The Red Hand	Manora Khan	Kurt Meisel	
1960	You Don't Shoot at Angels	Suarez	Rolf Thiele	
1961	The Transport	Leutnant Bleck	Jürgen Roland	
1963	The Great Escape	Oberst von Luger, Lagerkommandant	John Sturges	
1964	Mission to Venice	Carl Natzka	André Versini	
1966	Congress of Love	Metternich	Géza von Radványi	
1966	Once a Greek	Fahrcks	Rolf Thiele	
1966	The Defector	Dr. Saltzer	Raoul Lévy	
1966	Is Paris Burning?	Generaloberst Jodl	René Clément	
1974	Wer stirbt schon gerne unter Palmen	Jean-Pierre Pinaud	Alfred Vohrer	
1974	The Odessa File	General Glücks	Ronald Neame	

=== Television ===
Year	TV Show	Role	Notes
1960	Shadow of Heroes	János Kádár	based on Shadow of Heroes
1962	Liebe im September	Graham Colby	
1963	Die Legende vom heiligen Trinker	Andreas Kartak	based on The Legend of the Holy Drinker
1964	Der trojanische Krieg findet nicht statt	Odysseus	based on The Trojan War Will Not Take Place
1964	Die Verschwörung des Fiesco zu Genua	Fiesco	based on Fiesco
1968	König Richard II	King Richard II	based on Richard II
1969	Die Verschwörung	Julius Caesar	written by Walter Jens
1974-1975	Sergeant Berry	Commissioner Deeds	23 episodes
1975	Der tödliche Schlag	Odysseus	written by Walter Jens
1976	Fünf Prüfungen des Oberbürgermeisters	Konrad Adenauer	written by Peter von Zahn
1976	Mademoiselle de Scuderi	Cardillac	based on Mademoiselle de Scuderi
1976	Carnival Confession	Panezza	based on Die Fastnachtsbeichte
1977	Generale – Anatomie der Marneschlacht	Joseph Gallieni	written by Sebastian Haffner
1977	Die Befragung des Machiavelli	Machiavelli	
1977	Uncle Silas	Onkel Silas	based on Uncle Silas
1977	Die Dämonen	Stepan Trofimovich Verkhovensky	based on Demons
1978-1983	Derrick		3 episodes
1979	Union der festen Hand	von Zander	based on a novel by Erik Reger
1980	The Cause of the Crime	Mager, Teacher	based on a novella and a play by Leonhard Frank
1981	Collin	Havelka	based on a novel by Stefan Heym
1982	Fleeting Acquaintances	Paul	based on a novel by Dieter Wellershoff
1982	Frau Jenny Treibel	Leutnant a.D. Vogelsang	based on Frau Jenny Treibel
1983	The Oppermanns	Gutwetter	based on The Oppermanns
1983-1984	Diese Drombuschs	Herr Diehl, Oberstudienrat i.P.	4 episodes
1989	Langusten	Ernst	(final film role)
