= Uncle Silas (TV series) =

- Genre: Drama
- Based on: Uncle Silas by Sheridan Le Fanu
- Written by: Herbert Asmodi
- Directed by: Wilhelm Semmelroth
- Starring: Hannes Messemer; Cornelia Köndgen
- Composer: Hans Jönsson
- Country of origin: West Germany
- Original language: German
- No. of series: 1
- No. of episodes: 2

Production
- Producer: Gunther Witte
- Running time: 75 minutes
- Production company: Westdeutscher Rundfunk

Original release
- Network: ARD
- Release: 26 June – 28 June 1977

Uncle Silas (German: Onkel Silas) is a West German period television drama series which first aired on ARD in 1977. It is an adaptation of the novel of the same title by Sheridan Le Fanu.

== Cast ==
- Hannes Messemer as Onkel Silas
- Cornelia Köndgen as Maud
- Gerlinde Döberl as Milly
- Giovanni Früh as Dudley
- Dagmar Altrichter as Lady Nollys
- Ellen Schwiers as Madame Rougierre
- Rainer Rudolph as Captain Oakley
- Hans Jaray as Anwalt Brenton
- Alfons Höckmann as Anwalt Sleight
- Wolfgang Unterzaucher as Pfarrer Bowland
- Stephan Schwartz as Tom
- Johannes Buzalski as Torfstecher Hawkes
- Katerina Jacob as Meg Hawkes
- Elisabeth Endriss as Sarah

== Bibliography ==
- Knut Hickethier. Das Fernsehspiel der Bundesrepublik: Themen, Form, Struktur, Theorie und Geschichte; 1951-1977. Metzler, 1980.
