= Josephine Jacob =

German actress (born 1981)

- Born: 30 September 1981 (age 43); Starnberg, Bavaria, West Germany
- Occupation: Actress
- Partner: Roger Cross
- Children: 2
- Parent: Katerina Jacob
- Relatives: Ellen Schwiers (grandmother)

Josephine Jacob (born 30 September 1981) is a German actress.

== Life ==
Jacob is the daughter of actress Katerina Jacob and director Oswald Döpke and the granddaughter of actress Ellen Schwiers. She attended the New York Film Academy and Mastery Workshops in Vancouver, where she was trained by Ty Olsson and Linda Darfow and received voice training from Trish Allen.

Since 1998, she has played a number of roles in German television production and films, such as the 2001 movie comedy Mädchen, Mädchen, where, in addition to Diana Amft, Felicitas Woll and Karoline Herfurth played one of the girls. In the same year she appeared in the romantic action comedy Painful Welcome in the lead role of Ariane Schlagzu.

A supporting role as Pretty Girl in 2002 was her first engagement in Hollywood in the action crime film Ballistic: Ecks vs. Sever, in which Antonio Banderas and Lucy Liu played the lead roles. In the US television series The L Word, she starred in an episode in 2005. Under the direction of her grandmother Ellen Schwiers, Jacob played a minor role at the Burgfest in Jagsthausen in the plays The Knight of Miracle and The Taming of the Shrew.

Jacob is in a long term relationship with actor Roger Cross. They have two sons, including Gabriel Jacob-Cross, who is known for his roles on Snowpiercer (2020), Legion (2017), The Man in the High Castle (2015) and the Hallmark film A Christmas Miracle (2019).

== Filmography ==
- 1998: Ein Fleisch und Blut (TV film)
- 1999: Schlosshotel Orth (TV series, episode: Leidenschaften)
- 2000: Rausch (Short)
- 2001: Café Meineid (TV series, episode: Kinder)
- 2001: Mädchen, Mädchen
- 2001: Schmerzlich willkommen (TV series)
- 2002: Ballistic: Ecks vs. Sever
- 2002: Der Bulle von Tölz: Tod nach der Disco
- 2002: Schlosshotel Orth
- 2002: Morgenstund (Short)
- 2003: Die Stimmen (TV film)
- 2003: Today (Short)
- 2004: Lucky Stars
- 2005: The L Word (The L Word, TV series, episode: Labyrinth)
- 2009, 2010: Geschichten aus den Bergen, Traum meines Lebens (TV film + TV series)
- 2010: Klovn: The Movie
