= An Angel on Wheels =

1959 film by Géza von Radványi

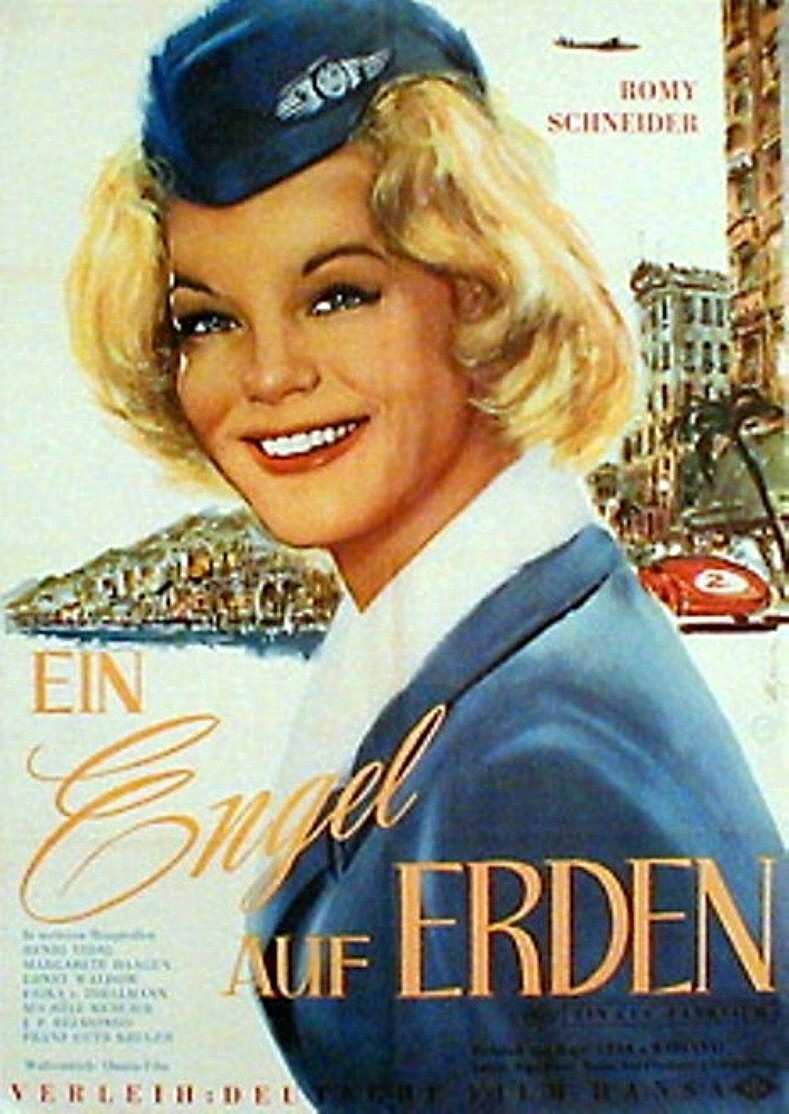
- Theatrical release poster
- German: Ein Engel auf Erden
- Directed by: Géza von Radványi
- Written by: René Barjavel; Géza von Radványi
- Produced by: René Bonef; Arys Nissotti
- Starring: Romy Schneider; Henri Vidal; Jean-Paul Belmondo
- Cinematography: Roger Hubert
- Edited by: Mike Leroy; René Le Hénaff; Ira Oberberg
- Music by: Jean Wiener; Gerhard Becker
- Production companies: Regina-Film; Criterion Productions; CCC Film
- Distributed by: Deutsche Film Hansa (West Germany); SNC (France)
- Release dates: 28 August 1959 (West Germany); 23 November 1960 (France)
- Running time: 89 minutes
- Countries: West Germany; France
- Language: French

An Angel on Wheels (German: Ein Engel auf Erden, French: Mademoiselle Ange) is a 1959 fantasy romantic comedy film directed by Géza von Radványi, who co-wrote the screenplay with René Barjavel, and starring Romy Schneider, Henri Vidal and Jean-Paul Belmondo. It is an international co-production between West Germany and France.

The film had 891,190 admissions in France.

== Plot ==
The stewardess of the Angel Starline airline is hopelessly in love with the famous racing driver Pierre Chaillot, who often uses the services of this airline on his trips. The stewardess often serves Pierre on board, but he does not pay any attention to her, which makes the girl in love cry bitterly.

Pierre is about to marry the beautiful Augusta, Princess of Munich, to whom he is already engaged. On the wedding day, the bride runs away from the altar with a famous singer. The deceived Pierre falls into despair and gets drunk in a hotel with his friend Michel. In his upset feelings, Pierre decides to shoot himself and writes a farewell note, but when he takes a gun out of his desk drawer to commit suicide, an angel suddenly appears next to him, taking the form of a stewardess in love with Pierre, and makes him give up on suicide. The appearance of the stewardess does not evoke any memories in him, Pierre does not believe in an angel, but after the stewardess reminded him of unknown details of his life, doubts arose in the racer's head.

The angel stewardess's superior in the heavenly hierarchy in the form of a nun is not delighted with the appearance of her subordinate's stewardess, but gives him permission to remain on earth for 24 hours and remain visible to people. From that moment on, the angel in the form of a stewardess never leaves Pierre for a minute. On earth, the guardian angel learns what it means to be human, to feel and experience pain. Mutual feelings arise between Pierre and the angel. But time flies, and it is time for the angel to leave. At that moment, Princess Augusta returned to Pierre. Pierre tries to check once again whether the stewardess is really an angel. He proposes to Augusta again and hopes that at the right moment the angel, if he is an angel, will make himself known. But on the orders of a superior angel, the guardian angel does nothing, Pierre makes peace with Augusta and is going to marry her after the Monaco Grand Prix . He has one last hope that the guardian angel will try to prevent the wedding and will appear on earth again.

Pierre behaves like a man possessed during the race, the angel nun, who looked after Pierre instead of the angel stewardess, barely manages to keep him on the track. In the end, Pierre wins the race. His guardian angel visited the stewardess in love during this time and appears again after the race. He leads Pierre to the Angel Starline plane, on which the stewardess in love works. Unnoticed by Pierre, the guardian angel disappears, and Pierre mistakes the stewardess on board for his beloved angel.

== Cast ==
- Romy Schneider as Line
- Henri Vidal as Pierre Chaillot
- Michèle Mercier as Augusta de Munchenberg
- Jean-Paul Belmondo as Michel Barrot
- Jean Brochard as Le père de Line
- Jean Tissier as Le présentateur du numéro du magicien au Riviera Club
- Paulette Dubost as La mère de Line
- Margarethe Hagen as L'ange chef
- Erika Von Thallman as La tante d'Augusta
- Ernst Waldow as Corelli
- Mario Beunat as Le commentateur de la radio
- Jean Panisse as Le pompiste
- Gérard Darrieu as Le chef de l'aéroport
- Pierre Sergeol as Commissioner
- Roland Rodier as Antonio
- René Worms as Le valet de chambre de la tante
- Lucien Callamand as Man at marriage
