= Final Accord =

Final Accord may refer to:

- Schlußakkord or Final Accord, a 1936 German film melodrama directed by Detlef Sierck, who later had a career in Hollywood as Douglas Sirk
- Final Accord (1938 film), a French-Swiss musical comedy film directed by Douglas Sirk
- Final Accord (1960 film), a drama film directed by Wolfgang Liebeneiner, a remake of the 1936 film
