= Antonio Veretti =

Italian composer and music educator (1901–1978)

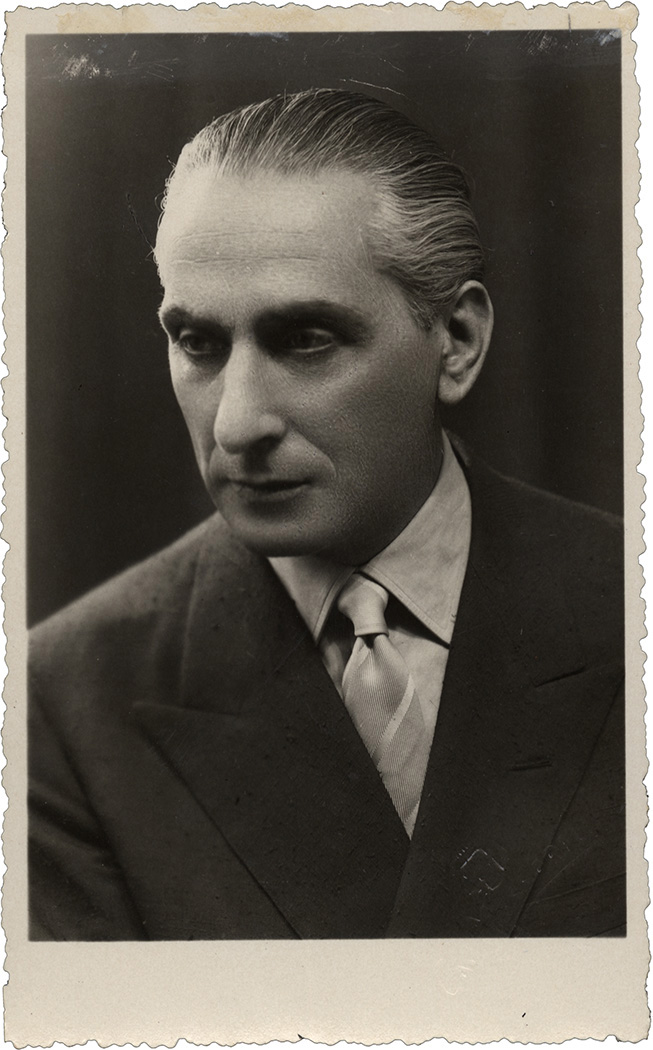
Antonio Veretti (before 1978)

Antonio Veretti (February 20, 1900 - July 13, 1978) was an Italian composer.

== Biography ==
The son of Oreste and Rosa Fraccari, Antonio Veretti was born in Verona on February 20, 1900. His brother Abelardo was also a musician who worked as a violin teacher. He studied at the Conservatory Giovanni Battista Martini in Bologna where he was a pupil of Franco Alfano and Guglielmo Mattioli. He graduated with a diploma in music composition in 1921. He wrote his first significant composition while a student at the conservatory, Tre liriche; a collection of art songs for voice and piano featuring text by Gabriele D'Annunzio, Giosue Carducci and Paul Verlaine.

In Bologna Veretti befriended the writer Riccardo Bacchelli who later served as the librettist for several of his operas. Bacchelli also introduced Veretti to the literary circle connected to the magazine La Ronda. His first opera with Bacchelli, Il medico volante, was adapted from Molière's 1659 play Le Médecin volant. Veretti composed the music to this opera in Verona in 1923-1924. His first composition to be published was the collection for voice and piano Cantico dei cantici: tre poemi dal testo biblico (1923, Bologna by Umberto Pizzi). In Bologna he was a member of the Accademia Filarmonica.

Veretti relocated to Milan in 1926 where he continued to compose while simultaneously working as a music critic for La fiera letteraria. He was also active in Milan as a concert pianist, and in that city he wrote his first significant orchestral composition, Sinfonia italiana (1929, published by Casa Ricordi in 1932). On 5 May 1930 he married Ines Verdi, and that same year he began working on the opera Il favorito del re. This opera was given its premiere at La Scala in 1932. From 1930 to 1933 he worked as a piano teacher at a high school in Turin. In Rome he founded the Conservatorio Musicale della Gioventù Italiana; teaching there from 1933 to 1943 during which time he was also active as a film score composer. While in Rome he became a member of the Accademia di S. Cecilia and of the Accademia Filarmonica.

During World War II, Veretti primarily devoted his energies to composing sacred music; including the oratorio Il figliuol prodigo (1942) based on the Gospel of Luke and the Sinfonia sacra (completed 1946) for male chorus and orchestra. Later he was director of the Pesaro Conservatory (1950-1952), Cagliari Conservatory (1953-1955) and finally of the Conservatory Luigi Cherubini in Florence in the period 1956–1970. His opera Burlesca was given its premiere at the Teatro dell'Opera di Roma in 1955. He also served as president of the Accademia Luigi Cherubini in Florence.

During his career, Veretti's compositions embraced a range of techniques and styles; some written in a neoclassical vein with an embrace of 16th and 17th-century Italian music traditions, and others embracing modernism. His early career was largely written in the style of neoclassicism; demonstrating a considerable influence from Ildebrando Pizzetti and Alfredo Casella. In the 1930s he began experimenting with mixing ancient musical forms with jazz and folk music; producing an eclectic and novel body of work which was controversial at that time. In his operas he attempted to move beyond verismo by introducing forms usually found in instrumental music. A member of the "middle generation" of Italian modernist composers, he eventually embraced twelve-tone technique; beginning with his Piano Concerto (1948). He continued to write in dodecaphonic language for the rest of his career, and by the end had embraced Webernian serialism in his Prière pour demander (1967).

Veretti died in Rome on July 13, 1978.

== Sources ==
=== Autographs ===
The autographs of almost all of Veretti's compositions are preserved in the Ricordi Archives in Milan.

==== Fondo Veretti ====
The sketches of all his works (even the unfinished ones) are in the Fondo Veretti of the Scuola di Musica in Fiesole. The fund was donated by his wife Ines to Veretti's friend and colleague Piero Farulli as early as 1978, with a final donation in 2005 At first kept in many rooms of Villa La Torraccia, since 1999 the collection has been gathered and catalogued in the library of the Scuola. Although 30 pieces remained at the Florence Conservatory, it can be said that the fund has preserved its entirety and contains the composer's personal archives and library. The collection contains 44 autographs (many sketches) of Veretti's compositions, 41 printed scores (mainly by Ricordi) of his works, 178 musical scores and manuscripts by other composers (from all periods, but especially from his contemporaries), 184 studio scores (with music ranging from Haydn to Boulez), and almost 300 monographs on musical, theatrical, literary and poetic subjects (from acoustics to harmonic theory). The archival material includes correspondence, tickets, photocopies, minutes of articles by and about Veretti (also added after his death), theater programs, honors, illustrative notes on his compositions, also in foreign languages, personal photos and photos of performances of his works, sketches and sets. The collection can be consulted on the OPAC of the Scuola di Musica di Fiesole, which is part of the Sistema Documentale Integrato dell'Area Fiorentina (SDIAF).

=== Prints ===
Veretti published almost exclusively with Ricordi, with occasional collaborations with Suvini Zerboni. Most of the first editions are in the Biblioteca Nazionale Centrale in Florence, followed by the Accademia di Santa Cecilia in Rome, the conservatories of Milan and Cagliari, and the Fondazione Levi in Venice.

== Letters ==
Most of the letters that Veretti sent to his publisher Ricordi are in the Archivio Ricordi in Milan, and many others are in the Fondo Veretti of the Scuola di Musica in Fiesole.

== Works ==
Veretti composed theatrical, vocal-instrumental, and instrumental music. Major compositions include:

=== Instrumental or vocal-instrumental music ===
- Trio for piano, flute and violin (1919)
- Three biblical poems for song and piano (1921)
- Sonata as a Fantasy for cello and piano (1922)
- Toccata for piano (1923)
- Instrumental Duo for violin and piano (1925)
- Sonata in F for cello and piano (1926)
- Partita for piano (1926)
- Six Stornelli (1926)
- Respect and Song
- Madrigal and Ballad: Two songs of Tasso (1928)
- Pascoliana, for voice and piano (1929)
- Sinfonia italiana for orchestra (1929)
- Suite in C, for orchestra (1934–36)
- Epic Symphony, for orchestra (1939)
- Divertimento, for harpsichord and 6 instruments (1939)
- Four Choirs (1939)
- Sinfonia sacra, for male choir and orchestra, on biblical texts (1943–46)
- Bicinia for violin and viola (1975)

=== Musical theater ===
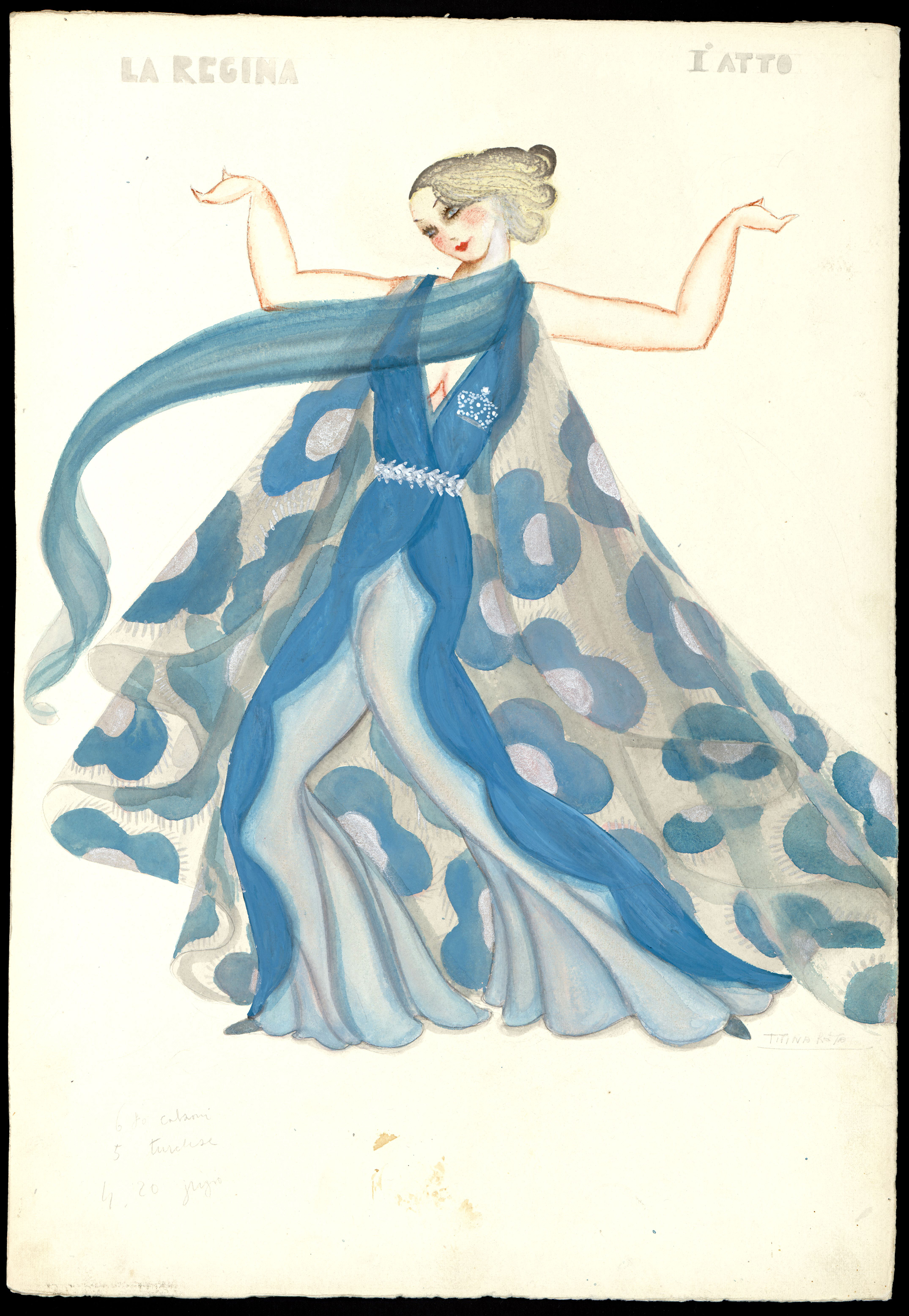
La Regina, figure for Il favorito del Re atto 1 (1932). Archivio Storico Ricordi.

- The flying doctor, farce in three acts on a text by Riccardo Bacchelli (1923)
- Il favorito del Re, comic opera in three acts and four scenes on a text by Arturo Rossato (first representation: Milan, 1932)
- Il galante tiratore, choreographic action by Riccardo Bacchelli (first performance: Rome, 1933)
- Una favola di Andersen, mime-symphonic action on a libretto by the same Veretti (Venice, 1934)
- Il figliuol prodigo, oratorio for soloists, choir and orchestra (1942)
- Burlesca, opera-ballet in one act, in three pictures and two intermezzos (from a novel of the Thousand and One Nights, remake of the Favorito del Re, 1942–45)
- The seven deadly sins, ballet (1956)

=== Movie music ===
- Le scarpe al sole, film of 1935 directed by Marco Elter.
- Regina della Scala, film of 1936 directed by Guido Salvini and Camillo Mastrocinque.
- Lo squadrone bianco, film of 1936 directed by Augusto Genina.
- Orgoglio, film of 1938, directed by Marco Elter.
- La conquista dell'aria, film of 1939 directed by Romolo Marcellini.
- Inferno giallo, 1942 film directed by Géza von Radványi.
- Bengasi, film of 1942 directed by Augusto Genina.
- L'assedio dell'Alcazar, film of 1940 directed by Augusto Genina.
- Cielo sulla palude, film of 1949 directed by Augusto Genina
- L'edera, 1950 film directed by Augusto Genina.
- Maddalena, film of 1954 directed by Augusto Genina.

== Discography ==
| Date | Title | Director | Ensemble | Label | Notes |
|---|---|---|---|---|---|
| 1954 | Canzone degli spazzacamini | Renata Cortiglioni | Coro di voci bianche dell'ARCUM | Istituto Centrale per i Beni Sonori e Audiovisivi | Recording released on CD by the Institute in 2007 with many other pieces for choir performed by the same interpreters. |
| 1960 | Burlesca | Massimo Freccia | RAI Milano | nastro per archivio interno della RAI, riversato su Compact Disc dall'Istituto Centrale per i Beni Sonori e Audiovisivi nel 1997 | Recorded at the RAI studios in Milan on June 23, 1960 |
| 1962 | Sinfonia sacra | Mario Rossi | RAI Roma | nastro per archivio interno della RAI | Recorded with a voice quartet by Giovanni Paisiello on March 22, 1962 |
| 1964 | I sette peccati | Rudolf Albert | RAI Milano | nastro registrato da una trasmissione radiofonica | Transmission of January 14, 1964 |
| 1965 (data incerta) | Sinfonia sacra | Nino Sanzogno | RAI Torino | nastro per archivio interno del Maggio Musicale Fiorentino | Recorded with Luigi Dallapiccola's Piccolo concerto for Muriel Couvreu (pianist Gino Gorini) |
| 1965 | Una favola di Andersen | Luigi Colonna | orchestra sconosciuta | registrazione non inclusa in nessun repertorio | Appears in the catalog of the collector Orfeo Vedovo |
| 1966 | Prière pour demander une étoile | Nino Antonellini | Coro da camera della RAI | Fabbri Editori (collana La musica moderna) | Recorded with Roman Vlad's Lettura di Michelangelo and Giorgio Federico Ghedini's sacred music in the Basilica of San Domenico in Siena on September 5, 1966 |
| 1967 (data incerta) | Sonata per violino e pianoforte (dedicata a una figlia immaginaria) | | Delia Pizzardi (pianoforte), Bruno Salvi (violino) | Fabbri Editori (collana La musica moderna) | Recording included in the previous disc |
| 1986 | Canzone degli spazzacamini | Paolo Lucci | Coro di voci bianche dell'ARCUM | Istituto Centrale per i Beni Sonori e Audiovisivi | Recorded for the Institute in 1986 with many other works for a cappella choir |
| 1993 | Benedetto sia 'l giorno | Bernardino Streito | Corale polifonica Valchiusella | Pro Civitate Christiana | Recorded with many other sacred choral pieces in the parish church of Trausella (Turin) in June and September 1993 |
| 2015 | Preludio accademico Canzone in memoria di Arcangelo Corelli Rondò popolaresco | | Pietro Bernasconi (organo) | Elegia | Recorded in Vercelli, together with music for organ (or transcribed for organ) composed by Antonio Bazzini, Amilcare Ponchielli, Mario Pilati, Nino Rota. |

== Bibliography ==
- Gasponi, Alfredo (1999). Il suono dell'utopia: Piero Farulli dal Quartetto italiano alla Scuola di musica di Fiesole (in Italian). Firenze-Antella: Passigli. ISBN 978-88-368-0623-2.
- Guido Maggiorino Gatti, Aspetti della situazione musicale in Italia, in «La rassegna musicale», V/1 (gen 1932), pp. 38–47.
- Filippo Brusa, Il favorito del re di Antonio Veretti ed Arturo Rossato, in «Rivista musicale italiana», XXXIX/1-2 (gen-giu 1932), pp. 152–159.
- VERETTI, Antonio (sub voce), in Enciclopedia Italiana, Seconda Appendice: 1938–1948, Roma: Istituto dell'Enciclopedia italiana, 1949.
- Nicola Costarelli, Antonio Veretti, Sonata per violino e pianoforte, in «Rivista musicale italiana», LVI/1 (gen-mar 1954), p. 99.
- Nicola Costarelli, Antonio Veretti, in «La rassegna musicale», XXV/1 (gen-mar 1955), pp. 26–32.
- Massimo Mila, Sette peccati senza penitenza, in Cronache musicali: 1955-1959, Torino, Einaudi, 1959.
- Nicola Costarelli, Antonio Veretti e la sua Prière pour demander une étoile, in «Chigiana», serie 3, 23, 49, 1966, pp. 291–296.
- Giorgio Vigolo, I peccati dodecafonici, in Mille e una sera all'opera e al concerto, Firenze, Sansoni, 1971.
- Rosenthal, Harold D.; Warrack, John (1991). "Veretti, Antonio". Dizionario enciclopedico dell'opera lirica (in Italian). Vol. II. Firenze: Le lettere. pp. 831–832. ISBN 978-88-7166-038-7.
- "Veretti, Antonio". Grande enciclopedia di musica classica. Rome: Curcio. 1982. ISBN 978-8806010157.
- Antonio Trudu, Veretti, Antonio, in Dizionario enciclopedico universale della musica e dei musicisti, diretto da Alberto Basso, serie II: Le biografie, vol. 8: Tem-Z, Torino, UTET, 1988, p. 221.
