= Twelve Hours By the Clock =

1959 film

- Directed by: Géza von Radványi
- Written by: Pierre Boileau; René Lefèvre; Thomas Narcejac; Jean-Louis Roncoroni; Géza von Radványi
- Produced by: Suzy Prim
- Starring: Lino Ventura; Eva Bartok; Gert Fröbe
- Cinematography: Henri Alekan
- Edited by: René Le Hénaff
- Music by: Léo Ferré
- Production companies: Les Films Fernand Rivers; Transocean-Film; Estela Films
- Distributed by: Les Films Fernand Rivers (France); Stella Film (W. Germany)
- Release date: 22 April 1959
- Running time: 105 minutes
- Countries: France; West Germany
- Language: German

Twelve Hours By the Clock (French: Douze heures d'horloge, German: Ihr Verbrechen war Liebe) is a 1959 French-West German crime drama film directed by Géza von Radványi and starring Lino Ventura, Eva Bartok and Gert Fröbe. It was shot at the Victorine Studios in Nice and on location around La Colle-sur-Loup and Villefranche-sur-Mer on the French Riviera. The film's sets were designed by the art director Eugène Piérac.

== Synopsis ==
Three men break out of prison, but one of them is wounded during the escape. They make plans to flee the country but have to wait for twelve hours in a fishing village in order to make their getaway on a small boat.

== Cast ==
- Lino Ventura as Albert Fourbieux
- Eva Bartok as Barbara
- Hannes Messemer as Serge
- Laurent Terzieff as Kopetzky
- Gert Fröbe as Le photographe Blanche
- Suzy Prim as Madame César
- Lucien Raimbourg as Monsieur César
- Gil Vidal as Maurice de Tercy
- Ginette Pigeon as Lucette
- Guy Tréjan as Armand - le gendarme
- René Worms as Le notaire
- Annick Allières as Louise - la bonne
- Fernand Bercher as Monsieur de Tercy
- Lucien Callamand as Le parrain de Lucette
- Paul Bisciglia as Octave

== Bibliography ==
- Bessy, Maurice & Chirat, Raymond. Histoire du cinéma français: 1956-1960. Pygmalion, 1986.
- Jacobsen, Wolfgang & Belach, Helga. Fifty Years Berlinale. Nicolai, 2000.
