= Nino Borghi =

- Born: 2 February 1918; Milan, Lombardy, Italy
- Died: 2 July 1994 (aged 76); Vienna, Austria
- Occupation: Art director
- Years active: 1953–1985 (film)

Nino Borghi (1918-1994) was an Italian-born Austrian art director.

== Selected filmography ==
- Arena of Death (1953)
- The King of Bernina (1957)
- The Invisible Terror (1963)
- Coffin from Hong Kong (1964)
- The Bandits of the Rio Grande (1965)
- My Father, the Ape and I (1971)
- Superbug, Super Agent (1972)
- The Merry Quartet from the Filling Station (1972)
- Karl May (1974)
- Sweet Derriere (1975)
- Goetz von Berlichingen of the Iron Hand (1979)

== Bibliography ==
- Fritsche, Maria (2013). Homemade Men in Postwar Austrian Cinema: Nationhood, Genre and Masculinity. New York: Berghahn Books. ISBN 978-0-85745-946-6.
