= Grete Minde (film) =

1977 film

- Directed by: Heidi Genée
- Written by: Heidi Genée; Theodor Fontane
- Produced by: Bernd Eichinger; Peter Genée
- Starring: Katerina Jacob
- Cinematography: Jürgen Jürges
- Edited by: Heidi Genée
- Release date: 1977
- Running time: 102 minutes
- Countries: Austria; West Germany
- Language: German

Grete Minde is a 1977 Austrian-German drama film based on the novel by Theodor Fontane and directed by Heidi Genée. It was entered into the 27th Berlin International Film Festival.

== Synopsis ==
The plot revolves around the case of a young woman deprived of her rightful inheritance by officials in her home town. She takes her revenge by setting fire to the town, in which she and her child also perish.

== Cast ==
- Katerina Jacob as Grete Minde
- Siemen Rühaak as Valtin Zernitz
- Hannelore Elsner as Trude Minde
- Tilo Prückner as Gerd Minde
- Brigitte Grothum as Emerentz Zernitz
- Käthe Haack as Domina
- Hans Christian Blech as Gigas
- Hilde Sessak as Regine
- Martin Flörchinger as Vater Minde
- Horst Niendorf as Valtins Onkel
