= Yellow Hell =

- Directed by: Géza von Radványi
- Written by: Edoardo Anton; Ugo Betti
- Starring: Fosco Giachetti; Maria von Tasnady; Pál Jávor
- Cinematography: Alberto Fusi
- Edited by: Otello Colangeli
- Music by: Antonio Veretti
- Production company: Colosseum Film
- Distributed by: Colosseum Film
- Release date: 5 November 1942
- Running time: 82 minutes
- Country: Italy
- Language: Italian

Yellow Hell (Italian: Inferno giallo) is a 1942 Italian drama film directed by Géza von Radványi and starring Fosco Giachetti, Maria von Tasnady and Pál Jávor. It was shot at the Cinecitta Studios in Rome.

== Synopsis ==
A Doctor working in the tropics falls in love with another man's wife, but is killed in a native uprising before he can confess his feelings to her.

== Cast ==
- Fosco Giachetti as Francesco
- Maria von Tasnady as Maria
- Pál Jávor as Pietro
- Petr Sharov as Il vecchio Dimitri
- Otello Toso as Giorgio
- Jone Salinas as La fanciulla indigena
- Lia Corelli
- Harry Feist

== Bibliography ==
- Gundle, Stephen. Mussolini's Dream Factory: Film Stardom in Fascist Italy. Berghahn Books, 2013.
