= Christiane Nielsen =

German actress

- Born: 10 September 1936; Würzburg, Germany
- Died: 8 April 2007 (aged 70); Frankfurt, Germany
- Occupation: Actress
- Years active: 1957–1967

Christiane Nielsen (10 September 1936 – 8 April 2007) was a German film actress. She appeared in 24 films between 1957 and 1967. She was born in Würzburg, Germany and died in Frankfurt, Germany.

== Selected filmography ==
- Frau im besten Mannesalter (1959)
- The Moralist (1959)
- Mrs. Warren's Profession (1960)
- Until Money Departs You (1960)
- The Woman by the Dark Window (1960)
- Bankraub in der Rue Latour (1961)
- One Prettier Than the Other (1961)
- The Puzzle of the Red Orchid (1962)
- The Sand Runs Red (1962)
- My Daughter and I (1963)
- The Invisible Terror (1963)
- Is Geraldine an Angel? (1963)
- Love Nights in the Taiga (1967)
- Ein Mann namens Harry Brent (1968, TV miniseries)
