= Uncle Tom's Cabin (1965 film) =

1965 film directed by Géza von Radványi

Onkel Toms Hütte
- Film poster
- Directed by: Géza von Radványi
- Screenplay by: Fred Denger; Géza von Radványi
- Based on: Uncle Tom's Cabin (1852) by Harriet Beecher Stowe
- Produced by: Aldo von Pinelli
- Starring: John Kitzmiller; Herbert Lom
- Cinematography: Heinz Hölscher
- Edited by: Victor Palfi; Hans Schube
- Music by: Peter Thomas
- Production companies: Avala Film; Central Cinema Company Film; Debora Film; Melodie Film; Sipro
- Distributed by: Nora-Filmverleih
- Release date: 1965
- Running time: 170 minutes (Germany); 118 minutes (U.S.)
- Countries: West Germany; France; Italy; Yugoslavia
- Language: German
- Budget: $10 million (North America); 9.97 million tickets (worldwide)

Uncle Tom's Cabin (German: Onkel Toms Hütte) is a 1965 German film directed by Géza von Radványi. The film was entered into the 4th Moscow International Film Festival. It is based on the novel Uncle Tom's Cabin.

In the early spring of 1977, the film was reissued in the United States in an edited form, with new scenes directed by Al Adamson. On the heels of the success that year of the miniseries Roots, the ad campaign for the reissue touted that the film had "ALL the SENSUAL and VIOLENT passions 'ROOTS' couldn't show on TV" and offered "the REAL story of the SLAVES, MASTERS & LOVERS."

== Cast ==
- John Kitzmiller as Uncle Tom
- Herbert Lom as Simon Legree
- Olive Moorefield as Cassy
- O.W. Fischer as Saint-Claire
- Catana Cayetano as Eliza
- Gertraud Mittermayr as Little Eva
- Mylène Demongeot as Harriet
- Charles Fawcett as Mr. Shelby
- Vilma Degischer as Mrs. Shelby
- Thomas Fritsch as George Shelby
- Bibi Jelinek as Virginia
- George Goodman as Sambo
- Juliette Gréco as Dinah
- Harold Bradley as Harris
- Eleonora Rossi Drago as Mrs. Saint-Claire

== Reception ==
=== Box office ===
In France, it was the 63rd top-grossing film of 1965, selling 928,110 tickets at the box office. In Poland, it sold more than 2 million tickets, making it one of the thirteen highest-grossing foreign films in Poland as of 1968. In North America, where it initially released in 1969, the film went on to sell 7,042,254 tickets and gross $10 million. This adds up to more than 9,970,364 tickets sold worldwide.

=== Critical response ===
Reviewing its 1977 reissue, Gene Siskel of the Chicago Tribune called the film "lousy", and, noting the comparisons its ad campaign made to Roots, remarked that "the only similarity is that both films contain scenes of slaves being whipped."

== See also ==
- List of films featuring slavery
