= Rose Bernd (1957 film) =

1957 film

- Film poster
- Directed by: Wolfgang Staudte
- Written by: Gerhart Hauptmann (play); Walter Ulbrich
- Produced by: Hans Abich; Gottfried Wegeleben
- Starring: Maria Schell
- Cinematography: Klaus von Rautenfeld
- Edited by: Lilian Seng
- Music by: Herbert Windt
- Production company: Bavaria Film
- Distributed by: Schorcht Filmverleih
- Release date: 31 January 1957
- Running time: 98 minutes
- Country: West Germany
- Language: German

Rose Bernd is a 1957 German drama film directed by Wolfgang Staudte. It was adapted from the play of the same name by Gerhart Hauptmann and was entered into the 1957 Cannes Film Festival. It was shot at the Bavaria Studios in Munich. The film's sets were designed by the art directors Hans Berthel and Robert Stratil.

== Cast ==
- Maria Schell as Rose Bernd
- Raf Vallone as Arthur Streckmann
- Käthe Gold as Henriette Flamm
- Leopold Biberti as Christoph Flamm
- Hannes Messemer as August Keil
- Arthur Wiesner as Vater Bernd
- Krista Keller as Maria Schubert
- Siegfried Lowitz as Judge
- Helmut Brasch

== Bibliography ==
- Goble, Alan. The Complete Index to Literary Sources in Film. Walter de Gruyter, 1999.
