= L'Étrange Désir de monsieur Bard =

- Directed by: Géza von Radványi
- Written by: Géza von Radványi; René Barjavel
- Produced by: Union générale cinématographique (France)
- Starring: Michel Simon; Louis de Funès
- Cinematography: Léonce-Henri Burel
- Edited by: René Le Hénaff
- Music by: Jean-Jacques Grunenwald
- Distributed by: A.G.D.C.
- Release date: 4 January 1954 (France)
- Running time: 108 minutes
- Country: France
- Language: French

L'Étrange Désir de monsieur Bard (English: The Strange Desire of Mr. Bard), is a French drama film from 1954, directed by Géza von Radványi, written by Géza von Radványi, starring Michel Simon and Louis de Funès.

== Plot ==
Auguste Bard is a bus driver who lives alone because women don't find him attractive. He suffers with a heart condition and eventually he is told by his doctor that he has only a short time left to live. He decides to take an early retirement. Then he wins a huge amount of money at a casino and can afford to pay the professional dancer Donata to keep him company.

== Cast ==
- Michel Simon: Auguste Bard
- Yves Deniaud: Antonio
- Geneviève Page: Donata
- Georgette Anys: Julie
- Louis de Funès: Monsieur Chanteau
- Paul Demange: the nervous doctor
- Paul Frankeur: the priest
- Geneviève Page: Donata Francescati, the dancer
- Henri Crémieux: Ernest, the grocer
- Henri Arius: the commissioner
- Lucien Callamand: the notary
- Emma Lyonel: the directrices
- Colette Ricard: Béatrice, the daughter of Julie and Ernest
- Jacques Erwin: the bailiff at the casino
- François Carron: the doctor at the maternity ward
- Maurice Bénard: the casino manager
- Yvonne Claudie: Caroline
- Félix Clément or Jean Clément: the first doctor
- Michel Gerbier: the little boy
- Claude Ermelli
- Colette Ravel
- Jacques Robin
