= The Invisible Terror =

1963 West German science fiction film

- Directed by: Raphael Nussbaum
- Written by: Raphael Nussbaum; Volodja Semitjov
- Produced by: Raphael Nussbaum; Leo Höger
- Starring: Hans von Borsody; Christiane Nielsen; Ellen Schwiers
- Cinematography: Michael Marszalek
- Edited by: Herta Chana
- Music by: Jean Thomé
- Production company: Aero Film
- Distributed by: Neue Film Allianz
- Release date: 2 May 1963
- Running time: 94 minutes
- Country: West Germany
- Language: German

The Invisible Terror (German: Der Unsichtbare) is a 1963 West German science fiction crime thriller film directed by Raphael Nussbaum and starring Hans von Borsody, Christiane Nielsen and Ellen Schwiers. Stylistically it is closer to a standard Krimi film rather than a horror in the tradition of The Invisible Man. The film's sets were designed by the art director Nino Borghi. Location shooting took place around West Berlin. It premiered at the Europa-Palast in Duisburg. It was broadcast on television but never released cinematically in the United States.

== Synopsis ==
After discovering a new formula that can make a person completely invisible Doctor Max Vogel contacts his brother Walter by phone to tell him. Shortly afterwards he disappears completely. A series of crimes than follow with each seemingly performed by an "invisible man" leading everyone to suspect Max, except Walter who launches his own investigation into the mystery.

== Cast ==
- Hans von Borsody as Walter Vogel
- Christiane Nielsen as Rita Weber
- Ellen Schwiers as Helen Roy
- Hannes Schmidhauser as Doctor Max Vogel
- Ivan Desny as Professor Lomm
- Charles Regnier as Charley Nelson
- Ilse Steppat as Doctor Louise Richards
- Herbert Stass as Janke
- Heinrich Gretler as Hauptkommissar Gretler
- Herbert Fux as Rocco
- Herta Freund as Emma
- Josef Menschik as Kramer

== Bibliography ==
- Clark, Mark & Senn, Bryan. Sixties Shockers: A Critical Filmography of Horror Cinema, 1960-1969. McFarland, 2025.
- Lentz, Harris M. Science Fiction, Horror & Fantasy Film and Television Credits: Filmography. McFarland, 2001.
