= Bengasi (film) =

1942 Italian war film

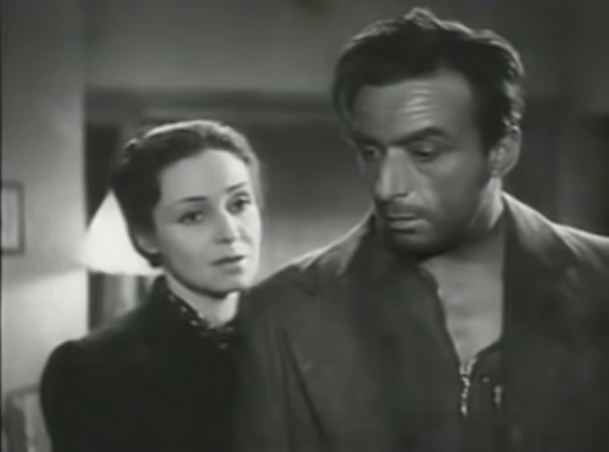
- Tasnady and Giachetti in a film scene
- Directed by: Augusto Genina
- Written by: Edoardo Anton; Ugo Betti; Alessandro De Stefani; Augusto Genina
- Produced by: Carlo Bassoli; Renato Bassoli
- Starring: Fosco Giachetti; Maria von Tasnady; Amedeo Nazzari; Vivi Gioi
- Cinematography: Aldo Tonti
- Edited by: Fernando Tropea
- Music by: Antonio Veretti
- Production company: Film Bassoli
- Distributed by: Cine Tirrenia
- Release date: 5 September 1942
- Running time: 90 minutes
- Country: Italy
- Language: Italian

Bengasi is a 1942 Italian war film directed by Augusto Genina and starring Fosco Giachetti, Maria von Tasnady and Amedeo Nazzari. The film was shot at Cinecittà in Rome. The film was a propaganda work, designed to support the Fascist regime of Benito Mussolini. It portrays Allied atrocities in Benghazi in Italian Libya, such as the murder of a peasant by a group of drunken Australian soldiers.

It was presented at the Venice Film Festival and won the Mussolini Cup as the best Italian film while Fosco Giachetti won the best actor award. It proved popular with audiences, and was re-released in 1955 with some new scenes added.

== Plot ==
The film is set in 1941 during World War II, when the city of Benghazi in Italian-ruled Libya was occupied by British forces. Italian inhabitants of Benghazi work to resist the British and discover their military plans. One man, Filippo Colleoni, appears to be collaborating with the British but is in fact working undercover for Italian intelligence. The film ends with the city being recaptured by Italian troops and their Nazi German allies.

== Main cast ==
- Fosco Giachetti as Captain Enrico Berti
- Maria De Tasnady as Carla Berti
- Amedeo Nazzari as Filippo Colleoni
- Vivi Gioi as Giuliana
- Guido Notari as Italian podestà in Benghazi
- Carlo Tamberlani as Giovanni Galassi
- Leo Garavaglia as doctor Malpini
- Laura Redi as Maria ('Fanny')
- Fedele Gentile as Antonio
- Amelia Bissi as Giovanni's mother
- Giorgio Costantini as General Robertson
- Guglielmo Sinaz as Tropeoli
- Carlo Duse as Captain Marchi
- Pier Giorgio Heliczer as Sandrino Berti
