= Woman Without a Past (1939 film) =

1939 film directed by Nunzio Malasomma

- Directed by: Nunzio Malasomma
- Written by: Curt J. Braun (novel); Charles Klein; Harald G. Petersson
- Starring: Sybille Schmitz; Albrecht Schoenhals; Maria von Tasnady
- Cinematography: Willy Winterstein
- Edited by: Alexandra Anatra
- Music by: Hans Carste
- Production company: Euphono-Film
- Distributed by: Panorama Film
- Release date: 18 July 1939
- Running time: 89 minutes
- Country: Germany
- Language: German

Woman Without a Past (German: Die Frau ohne Vergangenheit) is a 1939 German drama film directed by Nunzio Malasomma and starring Sybille Schmitz, Albrecht Schoenhals, and Maria von Tasnady. It was shot at the Grunewald and Johannisthal Studios in Berlin. The film's sets were designed by the art director Hans Ledersteger.

== Synopsis ==
After an accident, a young woman completely loses her memory and forgets who she is. She is discovered with a gun in her handbag and the police are called. A sympathetic neurologist takes her on as his laboratory assistant while he works on a cure for malaria. Then her husband arrives and her memory returns. It was his gun and she had seized it after he committed murder.

== Cast ==
- Sybille Schmitz as Eva
- Albrecht Schoenhals as Dr. Entrupp
- Maria von Tasnady as Ruth Willmann
- Hans Leibelt as Konsul Willmann
- Bernhard Minetti as Igor Costa
- Hansi Arnstaedt as Frau Willmann
- Paul Bildt as Professor Halden
- Hans Zesch-Ballot as Kriminalkommissar Schneidereit
- Rudolf Schündler as Kriminalassistent Semmler
- Erwin Biegel as Pietsch
- Dorit Kreysler as Ellen, Ruths Freundin
- Paul Otto as Freiherr von Ensing

== Bibliography ==
- Klaus, Ulrich J. Deutsche Tonfilme: Jahrgang 1939. Klaus-Archiv, 1988.
- Moeller, Felix (2000). The Film Minister: Goebbels and the Cinema in the Third Reich. Translated by Robinson, Michael. Stuttgart: Axel Menges. ISBN 978-3-932565-10-6.
