= Jedermann (film) =

1961 film

Everyman
- Directed by: Gottfried Reinhardt
- Written by: Hugo von Hofmannsthal (play)
- Produced by: Otto Dürer
- Starring: Ewald Balser
- Cinematography: Kurt Hasse
- Release date: 21 December 1961
- Running time: 96 minutes
- Country: Austria
- Language: German

Jedermann (English: Everyman) is a 1961 Austrian drama film directed by Gottfried Reinhardt, based on the 1911 play of the same title written by Hugo von Hofmannsthal. The film was submitted as the Austrian entry for the Best Foreign Language Film at the 34th Academy Awards, but it was not selected as one of the five nominees in the category.

== Plot ==
Death is sent by God to summon the wealthy bon vivant Jedermann. In his time of greatest need, he is abandoned by his lover, friends and wealth.

== Cast ==
- Walther Reyer as Jedermann
- Ellen Schwiers as Buhlschaft
- Paula Wessely as Glaube
- Sonja Sutter as Gute Werke
- Kurt Heintel as Der Tod
- Paul Dahlke as Mammon
- Ewald Balser as Die Stimme des Herrn
- Heinrich Schweiger as Der Teufel
- Alma Seidler as Jedermanns Mutter
- Max Lorentz as Der Spielansager
- Wolfgang Gasser as Jedermanns guter Gesell
- Viktor Braun as Der Koch
- Helmut Janatsch as Ein armer Nachbar
- Karl Blühm as Schuldknecht
- Roswitha Posselt as Schuldknechts Weib
- Herbert Fux as Knecht

== See also ==
- List of submissions to the 34th Academy Awards for Best Foreign Language Film
- List of Austrian submissions for the Academy Award for Best Foreign Language Film
