= Ellen Schwiers =

German actress (1930–2019)

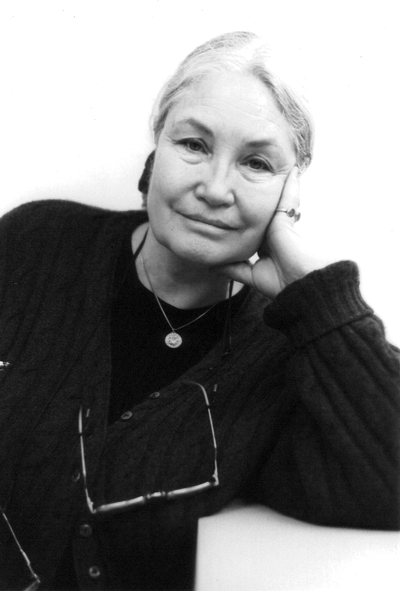
- Ellen Schwiers in 2008
- Born: 11 June 1930; Stettin, Pomerania, Germany
- Died: 26 April 2019 (aged 88); Starnberg, Germany
- Occupations: Actress; Stage director
- Years active: 1952–2015
- Spouse: Peter Jacob (m. 1956; died 1992)
- Children: Katerina Jacob; Daniel Jacob
- Parent: Lutz Schwiers
- Relatives: Holger Schwiers (brother); Josephine Jacob (granddaughter)
- Awards: Order of Merit of Baden-Württemberg; Order of Merit of the Federal Republic of Germany

Ellen Schwiers (11 June 1930 – 26 April 2019) was a German actress of stage, film, and television. She was featured in world premieres of plays by Dürrenmatt and Frisch at the Schauspielhaus Zürich, and appeared as Buhlschaft in Jedermann at the Salzburg Festival. In a career from 1949 to 2015, she also appeared in more than 200 films and television shows, including popular series such as Tatort. She also directed plays, founded a touring theatre company in 1982, and was Intendant of a festival from 1984.

== Career ==
Schwiers was born in Stettin on 11 June 1930, the daughter of Lutz Schwiers, a travelling actor who trained her. Her earliest theatre engagement was at the Theater Koblenz from 1949, and she was then engaged by Heinz Hilpert at the Theater Göttingen in 1953. Her first major role was the title role in Lessing's Minna von Barnhelm. She played in the world premieres of Dürrenmatt's Der Meteor and Frisch's Biografie: Ein Spiel at the Schauspielhaus Zürich. She was internationally recognised for playing Buhlschaft in Jedermann at the Salzburg Festival in 1961 and 1962, a role that she also played in a 1961 film, alongside Walther Reyer in the title role.

Schwiers appeared in more than 200 television productions, including popular series such as Tatort, Der rote Schal and Doktor Martin.

Schwiers first directed a play at the Burgfestspiele Jagsthausen, Shakespeare's Was ihr wollt (Twelfth Night). In 1984, she became Intendant of the festival.

Schwiers married Peter Jacob in 1956. Their daughter Katerina Jacob also became an actress. Their son Daniel, also an actor, died of cancer in 1985 at the age of 21. She is also the grandmother of Josephine Jacob. Schwiers founded a touring theatre company with her husband and daughter, Das Ensemble, which she kept running after her husband's death in 1992, and then passed to her daughter. She last appeared on stage at the age of 84 in the comedy Altweiberfrühling, with her daughter and her brother Holger Schwiers.

Schwiers died at her home in Starnberg on 26 April 2019.

== Selected filmography ==
The first film role for Schwiers was Hildegard in Heimliches Rendezvous in 1949, directed by Kurt Hoffmann. She appeared in more than 60 films, including:

- Heimliches Rendezvous (1949) as Hildegard
- 08/15 Zweiter Teil (1955) as Natascha
- Bandits of the Autobahn (1955) as Else Möller
- Skandal um Dr. Vlimmen (1956) as Nel van der Kalk
- The Story of Anastasia (1956) as Prinzessin Katharina von Russland
- Between Time and Eternity (1956) as Consuela
- The King of Bernina (1957) as Pia
- Polikuschka (1958) as Akulina
- Arms and the Man (1958) as Louka
- Nackt, wie Gott sie schuf (1958) as Priska
- Med mord i bagaget (1959) as Nina Christians
- Aus dem Tagebuch eines Frauenarztes (1959) as Ursula Callway
- A Doctor of Conviction (1959) as Oberschwester Hilde
- When the Bells Sound Clearly (1959) as Susanne Weiden
- The Cow and I (1959) as Josépha
- The Inheritance of Bjorndal (1960) as Gunvor
- Sooo nicht, meine Herren (1960) as Charlott' Rubizek, seine Sekretärin
- Der Gauner und der liebe Gott (1960) as Maria Holzmann
- Gustav Adolf's Page (1960) as Korinna
- The Last Witness (1960) as Ingrid Bernhardy
- Frau Irene Besser (1961) as Franziska von Stein
- Man in the Shadows (1961) as Miriam Capell
- Jedermann (1961) as Buhlschaft
- Wenn beide schuldig werden (1962) as Carla Förster
- The Sand Runs Red (1962) as Kerima
- The Brain (1962) as Ella
- The Invisible Terror (1963) as Helen Roy
- Ein Frauenarzt klagt an (1964) as Dr. Ursula Donati
- Tim Frazer and the Mysterious Mister X (1964) as Farida
- Der Satan mit den roten Haaren (1964) as Lorca
- The Bandits of the Rio Grande (1965) as Lida
- God's Thunder (1965) as Françoise
- 4 Schlüssel (1966) as Irene Quinn
- The Strangler of the Tower (1966) as Lady Trenton
- Ballad of a Gunman (1967) as Maruja's Mother
- Das Rasthaus der grausamen Puppen (1967) as Francis Nipple, Oberaufseherin
- 1900 (1976) as Amelia
- Uncle Silas (1977, TV Mini-Series) as Madame Rougierre
- Fedora (1978) as Nurse
- Woman Doctors (1984) as Ärztin im Wald
- Sherlock Holmes und die sieben Zwerge (1994) as Helene
- Play It Loud! (2003) as Frau im Circus
- Curse This House (2004, TV film) as Camille Thornton
- Mord am Meer (2004, TV film) as Gräfin Curland
- GG 19 - Eine Reise durch Deutschland in 19 Artikeln (2007) as Alte Dame (segment "Artikel 8")
- In the Prime of Life (2011, TV film) as Mrs. Schulz
- 3096 Days (2013) as Natascha's Grandmother

== Awards ==
- 1989: Officer's Cross of the Order of Merit of the Federal Republic of Germany
- 1995: Order of Merit of Baden-Württemberg
- 2013: Deutscher Schauspielpreis in the category "Starker Auftritt" (strong appearance) for In the Prime of Life
