= Das Riesenrad =

1961 film

- Film poster
- Directed by: Géza von Radványi
- Written by: Jan de Hartog (play); Ladislas Fodor
- Produced by: Artur Brauner
- Starring: Maria Schell
- Cinematography: Friedl Behn-Grund
- Production company: CCC Film
- Distributed by: Gloria Film
- Release date: 25 August 1961
- Running time: 110 minutes
- Country: West Germany
- Language: German

Das Riesenrad (English: The Giant Wheel) is a 1961 West German drama film directed by Géza von Radványi. It was entered into the 2nd Moscow International Film Festival. It was shot at the Spandau Studios and on location in Vienna and West Berlin. The sets were designed by the art directors Johannes Ott and Willy Schatz.

== Cast ==
- Maria Schell as Elisabeth von Hill
- O. W. Fischer as Rudolf von Hill
- Adrienne Gessner as Adele von Hill
- Rudolf Forster as Hofrat von Hill
- Doris Kirchner as Gusti Gräfin Wallburg
- Gregor von Rezzori as Graf Wallburg
- Gusti Wolf as Gisela von Hill
- Alexander Trojan as Walter von Hill
- Anita Gutwell as Rita
