= Men Without a Fatherland =

1937 film

- Directed by: Herbert Maisch
- Written by: Gertrud von Brockdorff (novel); Lotte Neumann; Ernst von Salomon; Walter Wassermann; Herbert Maisch
- Produced by: Bruno Duday
- Starring: Willy Fritsch; Maria von Tasnady; Willy Birgel; Grethe Weiser
- Cinematography: Konstantin Irmen-Tschet
- Edited by: Milo Harbich; Gottfried Ritter
- Music by: Henri Rene
- Production company: UFA
- Distributed by: UFA
- Release date: 16 February 1937
- Running time: 105 minutes
- Country: Nazi Germany
- Language: German

Men Without a Fatherland (German: Menschen ohne Vaterland) is a 1937 German drama film directed by Herbert Maisch and starring Willy Fritsch, Maria von Tasnady and Willy Birgel.

The film's sets were designed by the art director Erich Kettelhut.

== Synopsis ==
In Latvia at the end of the First World War, a group of Freikorps battle against an attempted takeover of the Baltic States by Communist forces.

== Cast ==
- Willy Fritsch as Oberleutnant Maltzach
- Maria von Tasnady as Irene Marellus
- Willy Birgel as Baron Falen
- Grethe Weiser as Jewa - Chansonette
- Siegfried Schürenberg as Hauptmann Angermann
- Werner Stock as Leutnant Berndt
- Erich Dunskus as Steputat - Unteroffizier
- Josef Sieber as Pleikies - Bursche
- Willi Schaeffers as Soykas - Landesrat
- Nicolas Koline as Diener Stepan
- Luis Rainer as Wolynski
- Aribert Grimmer as Bauer Rauta
- Lissy Arna as Mila Wentos
- Hans Stiebner as Kigull
- Maria Loja as Orla, Wirtin
- Traute Baumbach as Maruschka, ein russisches Bauernmädel
- Tamara Höcker as Ein kommunistisches Bauernmädel
- Valy Arnheim as Ein russischer Kommandeur
- Jur Arten as Ein russischer Offizier
- Boris Alekin as Ein Kellner im 'Sarasan'
- Johannes Bergfeldt as Ein russischer Offizier
- Zlatan Kasherov
- Werner Kepich as Ein russischer Agent
- Herbert Klatt as Ein Soldat der Kompanie Maltzach
- Karl Meixner as Ein Aufwiegler
- Hermann Meyer-Falkow
- Hans Meyer-Hanno
- Erich Nadler as Ein russischer Agent
- Hellmuth Passarge as Ein Soldat der Kompanie Maltzach
- Gustav Püttjer
- Arthur Reinhardt as Ein Soldat der Kompanie Maltzach
- Jakob Sinn as Zweiter Unteroffizier der Kompanie Maltzach
- Theo Stolzenberg as Popott - Besitzer des Tanzlokals 'Sarasan'
- Albert Venohr as Emmi de Néve
- Hugo Gau-Hamm
- Alexander Golling as Ischnikoff
- Kai Möller as Ein Soldat der Kompanie Maltzach
- Walter Raat-Kraatz
- Hans Sobierayski as Ein Kapellmeister
- Anny von Bornsdorf

== Bibliography ==
- Hake, Sabine (2001). Popular Cinema of the Third Reich. University of Texas Press. ISBN 978-0-292-73458-6.
- Richards, Jeffrey (1973). Visions of Yesterday. Routledge & K. Paul. ISBN 978-0-7100-7576-5.
