= The Doctor of Stalingrad =

1958 film

- Directed by: Géza von Radványi
- Written by: Heinz G. Konsalik (novel); Werner P. Zibaso
- Produced by: Walter Traut
- Starring: O.E. Hasse; Eva Bartok; Hannes Messemer; Mario Adorf
- Cinematography: Georg Krause
- Edited by: René Le Hénaff
- Music by: Siegfried Franz
- Production company: Divina-Film
- Distributed by: Gloria Film
- Release date: 20 February 1958
- Running time: 110 minutes
- Country: West Germany
- Languages: German; Russian

The Doctor of Stalingrad (German: Der Arzt von Stalingrad also known as Battle Inferno) is a 1958 German drama film directed by Géza von Radványi and starring O.E. Hasse, Eva Bartok and Hannes Messemer. It is an adaptation of the 1956 novel The Doctor of Stalingrad by Heinz G. Konsalik. The film addresses the issue of German Prisoners of War held by the Soviet Union in camps well into the 1950s. The principal character Doctor Fritz Böhler was loosely modelled on Ottmar Kohler, known as the "Angel of Stalingrad".

The film's sets were designed by the art directors Willy Schatz and Robert Stratil.

== Main cast ==
- O.E. Hasse as Doctor Fritz Böhler
- Eva Bartok as Captain Alexandra Kasalinskaja
- Hannes Messemer as Oberleutnant Pjotr Markow
- Mario Adorf as Pelz, Sanitäter
- Walter Reyer as Doctor Sellnow
- Vera Tschechowa as Tamara
- Paul Bösiger as Fähnrich Peter Schultheiß
- Leonard Steckel as Major Dr. Kresin, Distriktarzt
- Valéry Inkijinoff as Oberstleutnant Worotilow, Lagerkommandant
- Michael Ande as Sergej, Worotilows Sohn
- Siegfried Lowitz as Walter Grosse
- Til Kiwe as Sauerbrunn
- Wilmut Borell as Pastor
- Rolf von Nauckhoff as Oberst Eklund, Swedish Red Cross

== Bibliography ==
- Davidson, John; Hake, Sabine (2009). Framing the Fifties: Cinema in a Divided Germany. Berghahn Books. ISBN 978-1-84545-536-1.
