= Uncle Silas =

1864 novel by J Sheridan Le Fanu

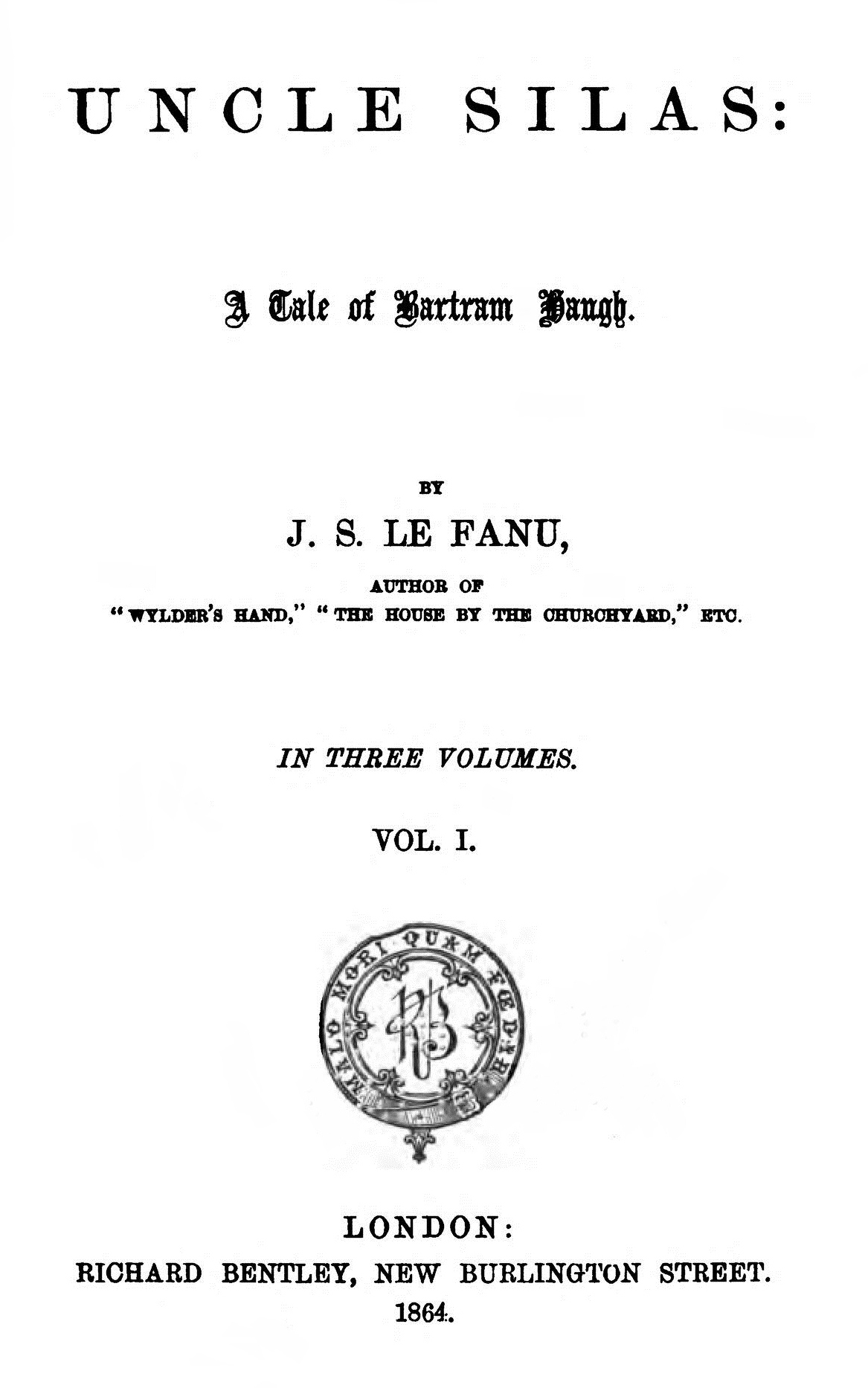
- First edition title page (1864)
- Author: Sheridan Le Fanu
- Language: English
- Genre: Gothic mystery-thriller, psychological suspense
- Publisher: Dublin University Magazine (serialized); Richard Bentley (hardcover)
- Publication date: 1864
- Publication place: Ireland
- Media type: Printed

Uncle Silas, subtitled "A Tale of Bartram Haugh", is an 1864 Victorian Gothic mystery-thriller novel by the Irish writer Sheridan Le Fanu. The novel is a first-person narrative told from the viewpoint of one of the main characters. Despite Le Fanu resisting its classification as such, the novel has also been hailed as a work of sensation fiction by contemporary reviewers and modern critics alike. It is an early example of the locked-room mystery subgenre, rather than a novel of the supernatural (despite a few creepily ambiguous touches), but does show a strong interest in the occult and in the ideas of Emanuel Swedenborg, a Swedish scientist, philosopher and Christian mystic.

Like many of Le Fanu's novels, Uncle Silas grew out of an earlier short story, in this case "A Passage in the Secret History of an Irish Countess" (1839), which he also published as "The Murdered Cousin" in the collection Ghost Stories and Tales of Mystery (1851). While this earlier story was set in Ireland, the novel's action takes place in Derbyshire; the author Elizabeth Bowen was the first to identify a distinctly Irish subtext to the novel, however, in spite of its English setting. It was first serialized in the Dublin University Magazine in 1864, under the title Maud Ruthyn and Uncle Silas, and appeared in December of the same year as a three-volume novel from the London publisher Richard Bentley. Several changes were made from the serialization to the volume edition, such as resolving the inconsistencies of names.

Uncle Silas is known for its psychological suspense, exploration of various themes such as betrayal and inheritance, and its depiction of a prominent female protagonist. The novel's setting, particularly the contrast between its main characters, plays a significant role in the narrative. As one of Le Fanu's best-known works, the novel has been adapted numerous times for films, television series, books, radio, and other audio recordings.

== Plot summary ==
The novel is a first-person narrative told from the point of view of the adolescent girl Maud Ruthyn, an heiress living with her wealthy, sombre, reclusive father Austin Ruthyn in their mansion at Knowl. Through her father and her worldly, cheerful cousin, Lady Monica Knollys, she gradually learns more regarding her uncle, Silas Ruthyn, a black sheep of the family whom she has never met; once an infamous rake and gambler, he is now apparently a fervently reformed Christian. His reputation has been tainted by the suspicious suicide of a man to whom Silas owed an enormous gambling debt, which took place within a locked, apparently impenetrable room in Silas's mansion at Bartram-Haugh.

In the first part of the novel, Maud's father hires a French governess, Madame de la Rougierre, as a companion for her. Madame terrifies Maud and appears to have designs on her: during two of their walks together, Maud is brought into suspicious contact with strangers that seem to be known to Madame. (In a cutaway scene that breaks the first-person narrative, we learn that she is in league with Silas's good-for-nothing son Dudley.) The governess is eventually dismissed when she is discovered by Maud in the act of searching her father's locked desk.

Maud is asked in obscure terms by her father, a Swedenborgian, if she is willing to undergo some kind of "ordeal" to clear the name of her uncle, and of the family more generally; shortly after she assents, her father dies from a ruptured aneurysm. At the reading of his will, it emerges that he had added a codicil to it so that Maud will live with Silas, who becomes her guardian until she comes of age. However, the will allows that, if she were to die whilst still a minor, the estate would then pass to Silas. Lady Knollys, together with Austin's executor and fellow Swedenborgian, Dr. Bryerly, attempts in vain to overturn the codicil, realizing its dangerous implications for the young heiress; despite their efforts, Maud consents willingly to spending the next three and a half years at Bartram-Haugh.

Maud initially finds life at Bartram-Haugh strange but not unpleasant, despite ominous signs such as the uniformly unfriendly servants and Silas's malevolent factotum, the one-legged Dickon Hawkes. Silas himself frightens Maud but is nonetheless seemingly kind to her, in contrast to his treatment of his own children, the loutish Dudley and the uneducated Millicent ('Milly'). Although Maud initially deprecates Millicent's rustic manners they become best friends, and each other's only source of companionship at the estate. During her stay, Maud is subject to various attempts by her cousin Dudley to court her, but she rejects him thoroughly on each occasion. Silas is periodically subject to mysterious catatonic fits, attributed to his massive consumption of laudanum.

Various ominous happenings begin to take place at Bartram-Haugh, and it becomes increasingly difficult for Maud and Millicent to find any way out of the estate. Meanwhile, Dudley's courtship culminates in a marriage proposal to Maud; when she complains to Silas about it, he attempts to coax her into accepting. She is relieved when it is discovered that Dudley is already married, and after being disowned by his father, he and his wife leave to set sail to Australia. Silas decides that Millicent should attend a boarding school in France, and sends her away with the promise that Maud is to join her after three months.

Maud is shocked to discover Madame de la Rougierre is residing at Bartram-Haugh in the employ of Silas, and suspects also that Dudley may not have left the country. Despite Maud's strong protests, Madame is charged with accompanying her first to London, and then on to Dover and across the English Channel. After falling asleep during the journey and being escorted under the cover of darkness, Maud awakes to find herself again at Bartram-Haugh: she had in fact been on a round trip to London and back. Maud finds herself now imprisoned in one of the mansion's many bedrooms under the guard of Madame, whilst everyone believes she is in France.

Remembering the earlier warnings of Meg Hawkes, Maud refuses to drink anything offered to her; instead, Madame, ignorant of Silas's true intentions, drinks drugged claret intended for Maud and promptly falls asleep on Maud's bed. Later that night, Dudley scales the building and enters the unlit room, which is the one in which the supposed suicide took place; the window he uses is set upon concealed hinges that allow it to be opened only from the outside. Hidden out of sight, Maud witnesses Dudley brutally murder Madame in the near-darkness, mistaking her for Maud. Silas enters the room, having been waiting outside; as he does this, Maud slips out undetected. Assisted by Dickon's daughter, whom Maud had befriended during her stay, she is swiftly conveyed by carriage to Lady Knollys's estate, and away from Bartram-Haugh.

Silas is discovered in the morning lying dead of a laudanum overdose, while Dudley becomes a fugitive and is thought to be hiding in Australia. Maud is happily married to the charming and handsome Lord Ilbury and ends her recollections on a philosophical note:

This world is a parable—the habitation of symbols—the phantoms of spiritual things immortal shown in material shape. May the blessed second-sight be mine—to recognise under these beautiful forms of earth the ANGELS who wear them; for I am sure we may walk with them if we will, and hear them speak!

== Allusions in other works ==
Uncle Silas remains Le Fanu's best-known novel, popular for its themes of betrayal and suspense, along with a noteworthy female protagonist. It was the source for Arthur Conan Doyle's The Firm of Girdlestone, and remains a touchstone for contemporary mystery fiction. There are also strong connections between Uncle Silas and some of Wilkie Collins' novels, especially The Woman in White; both writers, while recognisably within the Gothic tradition, depict heroines who are more credible and nuanced than the persecuted maidens of Ann Radcliffe and others. Daphne du Maurier was likely influenced by Uncle Silas, notably in the novels Rebecca, in which a lonely and insecure young woman is tormented by a manipulative female servant, and Jamaica Inn, which centres on an orphaned girl sent to live with her sinister, criminal uncle.

== Film and television adaptations ==
A film version, also titled Uncle Silas (though initially released in the United States as The Inheritance), was made by Gainsborough Studios in 1947. It was directed by Charles Frank, with Derrick De Marney as Silas and Jean Simmons as the heroine (whose given name was changed from Maud to Carolyn).

A feature-length British television adaptation was made for the Thames Television series Mystery and Imagination (1968). Maud was played by Lucy Fleming with Robert Eddison as Silas.

In 1977 a West German series Uncle Silas was produced featuring Hannes Messemer in the title role.

The Dark Angel, a further adaptation starring Peter O'Toole as Silas, premiered on BBC Television in 1989, and was broadcast on PBS in the US on 21 March 1991.

In October 2021, principal photography began on an adaptation financed by Fís Éireann/Screen Ireland. It is being directed by Lisa Mulcahy, with Agnes O'Casey as Maud and David Wilmot as Silas. It was released in 2023 under the title Lies We Tell.

== Radio and audio adaptations ==
The BBC has also broadcast radio adaptations of the novel, including:

- 1953, an adaptation by H. Arnold Hill, with Carleton Hobbs as Silas, Marjorie Westbury as Maud and Gladys Spencer as Madame de la Rougierre.
- 1981, a 3-part adaptation by Joan O'Connor directed by Kay Patrick, with Peter Vaughan as Silas and Kate Lee as Maud.
- 1995, a 3-part adaptation by Alan Drury directed by Enyd Williams, with Teresa Gallagher as Maud, George Cole as Silas, Dorothy Tutin as Madame de la Rougierre and Joan Sims as Lady Monica Knollys.
