= The Transport =

1961 film

- Directed by: Jürgen Roland
- Written by: Michael Mansfeld; Hans Rameau; Heinz Oskar Wuttig
- Based on: The Transport by Wolfgang Altendorf
- Produced by: Hermann Schwerin; Alf Teichs; Hans Wolff
- Starring: Hannes Messemer; Armin Dahlen; Inge Langen
- Cinematography: Heinz Hölscher; Ted Kornowicz
- Edited by: Klaus Dudenhöfer
- Production company: Fono Film
- Distributed by: UFA Film Hansa
- Release date: 30 June 1961
- Running time: 90 minutes
- Country: West Germany
- Language: German

The Transport (German: Der Transport) is a 1961 West German war drama film directed by Jürgen Roland and starring Hannes Messemer, Armin Dahlen and Inge Langen. It is an adaptation of a novel of the same title by Wolfgang Altendorf. It was shot at the Tempelhof Studios in West Berlin and on location around Donaueschingen and Germersheim. The film's sets were designed by the art director Robert Stratil. It is also known by the alternative title Destination Death.

== Synopsis ==
In March 1945 German prison warder Leutnant Bleck is ordered to escort a group of prisoners to the Western Front to work in extremely dangerous circumstances. A difficult rail journey follows amidst the collapsing Third Reich. Bleck discovers his inner morality and instead attempts to turn them over to the advancing Allied forces.

== Cast ==
- Hannes Messemer as Leutnant Bleck
- Armin Dahlen as Feldwebel Steinlein
- Peter Herzog as Unteroffizier Brix
- Inge Langen as Helga Burghardt
- Eva Katharina Schultz as Susanne Westphal
- Helmo Kindermann as Leutnant Thomsteg
- Kurd Pieritz as Oberleutnant Schwerdtfuß
- Leo Bieber as Major Krugstein
- Horst Keitel as Unteroffizier Mahlmann
- Andreas Wolf as Dr. Born
- Benno Hoffmann as Ketten-Charly
- Heinrich Gies as Lohmann
- Horst Naumann as Zobel
- Wolfgang Völz as Jansen
- Johannes Grossmann as Schramm
- Kurt Pratsch-Kaufmann as Wirbel
- Paul Klinger as Narrator

== Bibliography ==
- Goble, Alan. The Complete Index to Literary Sources in Film. Walter de Gruyter, 1999.
- Meyer, Ulfilas. Kino-Express: Die Eisenbahn in der Welt des Films. Bucher, 1985.
- Rentschler, Eric. German Film & Literature. Routledge, 2013.
