= Goetz von Berlichingen of the Iron Hand (1979 film) =

1979 film

- Directed by: Wolfgang Liebeneiner; Harald Reinl (second unit)
- Written by: Wolfgang Liebeneiner; Johann Wolfgang von Goethe (play)
- Produced by: Theo Maria Werner
- Starring: Raimund Harmstorf; Michèle Mercier
- Cinematography: Ernst W. Kalinke
- Edited by: Annemarie Rokoss
- Music by: Ernst Brandner
- Production companies: Regina Films; Viktoria-Film; Jadran Film
- Distributed by: Constantin Film
- Release date: 19 January 1979
- Running time: 102 minutes
- Countries: West Germany; Yugoslavia
- Language: German

Goetz von Berlichingen of the Iron Hand (German: Götz von Berlichingen mit der eisernen Hand) is a 1979 West German-Yugoslavian historical adventure film directed by Wolfgang Liebeneiner and starring Raimund Harmstorf, Michèle Mercier, and Sky du Mont. It is an adaptation of the 1773 play Götz von Berlichingen by Johann Wolfgang von Goethe.

The film's sets were designed by the art director Nino Borghi. Location shooting took place around various sites in Salzburg, Austria and Zagreb, Yugoslavia (present-day Croatia).

== Main cast ==
- Raimund Harmstorf as Götz von Berlichingen
- Ulli Bauer as Georg, Götz's page
- Sky du Mont as Hans von Selbitz
- Detlev Eckstein as Franz von Tautenberg
- Erik Frey as Emperor Maximilian
- Joachim Hansen as Kaiserlicher Hauptmann
- Hans Holt as Bischof von Bamberg
- Adrian Hoven as Jäger Lerse
- Karl Lieffen as Assessor Olearius
- Silvia Reize as Elisabeth von Berlichingen
- Reiner Schöne as Franz von Sickingen
- Ernst Stankovski as Liebetraut
- Sabina Trooger as Marie von Berlichingen
- Klausjürgen Wussow as Adalbert von Weislingen
- Michèle Mercier as Adalheid, Countess von Walldorff
- Herbert Fux as Bauer Sievers
- Michael Gahr as Brautvater
- Ruth Gassmann as Zofe Margarete
- Wolf Goldan as Reiter Hans
- Erhart Hartmann as Reiter Hinz
- Kurt Jaggberg as Bauer Metzler
- Dietrich Kerky as Reiter Peter

== Bibliography ==
- Goble, Alan (1999). The Complete Index to Literary Sources in Film. Berlin: Walter de Gruyter. ISBN 978-3-11-095194-3.
