= Robert Stratil =

German art director (1919–1976)

- Born: 30 March 1919; Ostrava, Czechoslovakia
- Died: 8 August 1976 (aged 57); Munich, West Germany
- Occupation: Art Director
- Years active: 1955-1976 (film)

Robert Stratil (1919 – 1976) was a German art director. Born in Ostrava of Sudeten German heritage, he fled Czechoslovakia following World War II and settled in Munich where he worked at the Bavaria Studios.

== Selected filmography ==
- Sky Without Stars (1955)
- Once a Greek (1956)
- Rose Bernd (1957)
- The Doctor of Stalingrad (1957)
- The Crammer (1958)
- Dorothea Angermann (1959)
- You Don't Shoot at Angels (1960)
- The Black Sheep (1960)
- A Woman for Life (1960)
- One, Two, Three (1961)
- The Transport (1961)
- A Mission for Mr. Dodd (1964)
- The Gentlemen (1965)
- Love Nights in the Taiga (1967)
- A Woman Needs Loving (1969)

== Bibliography ==
- Greco, Joseph. The File on Robert Siodmak in Hollywood, 1941-1951. Universal-Publishers, 1999.
