= Love Nights in the Taiga =

1967 film by Harald Philipp

- Directed by: Harald Philipp
- Written by: Heinz G. Konsalik (novel); Werner P. Zibaso
- Produced by: Jürgen Goslar; Franz Seitz
- Starring: Thomas Hunter; Marie Versini; Stanislav Ledinek
- Cinematography: Helmut Meewes
- Edited by: Ingeborg Taschner
- Music by: Manfred Hübler
- Production company: Franz Seitz Filmproduktion
- Distributed by: Nora-Filmverleih
- Release date: 5 October 1967
- Running time: 105 minutes
- Country: West Germany
- Language: German

Love Nights in the Taiga (German: Liebesnächte in der Taiga) is a 1967 West German thriller film directed by Harald Philipp and starring Thomas Hunter, Marie Versini and Stanislav Ledinek. It is also known by the alternative title of Code Name Kill.

The film's sets were designed by the art director Robert Stratil. It is an adaptation of the 1966 novel of the same title by Heinz G. Konsalik.

== Synopsis ==
At the height of the Cold War, the CIA send a Russian-speaking Baltic German to the Soviet Union disguised as a Swiss fashion journalist. His real mission is to gather intelligence on a missile base concealed in the taiga forests of Siberia. He receives assistance from a Soviet woman who falls in love with him.

== Cast ==
- Thomas Hunter as Frank Heller
- Marie Versini as Ludmilla Barankova
- Stanislav Ledinek as Colonel Karpuchin
- Ivan Desny as Colonel Kirk
- Rolf Boysen as Karpuchin
- Biggi Freyer as Marta Barinskaya
- Hellmut Lange as Captain Jimmy Braddock
- Walter Barnes as Jurij
- Magda Konopka as Bibi Randall
- Christiane Nielsen as Tanja
- Kurd Pieritz as Kusnezoff
- Sandra Prinsloo as Nadja
- Marius Weyers as Markjoff

== Bibliography ==
- Peter Cowie & Derek Elley. World Filmography: 1967. Fairleigh Dickinson University Press, 1977.
