= Sweet Derriere =

- Directed by: Georg Tressler
- Written by: Willi Frisch (= Willy Pribil)
- Starring: Werner Ploner; Gustav Schneller; Lydia Mikulski
- Edited by: Eliska Stibrova
- Music by: Hans Hammerschmid
- Production company: Viktoria-Film
- Release date: 17 January 1975
- Country: Austria
- Language: German

Sweet Derriere (German: Die Kleine mit dem süßen Po) is a 1975 Austrian sex comedy film directed by Georg Tressler and starring Werner Ploner, Gustav Schneller and Lydia Mikulski. The film's sets were designed by the art director Nino Borghi.

== Cast ==
- Werner Ploner as Picheldorfer
- Gustav Schneller as Spanner
- Lydia Mikulski as Muschi
- Monika Sebek as Angela
- Sonja Sitar as Birgit
- Heinz Holden as Thomas
- Annemarie Schüler as Tatjana
- Elfriede Gerstl as Dr. Küssnacht
- Renée Felden as Frau Kellermann
- Christian Schratt as Michael
- Franz Waldeck as Oberförster
- Harald Serafin
- Karl Krittl as Pfarrer
- Johann Sklenka as Wassermann
- Fritz Goblirsch as Kellermann
- Gerti Schneider as Claudia
- Margit Schwarzer as Petra

== Bibliography ==
- Robert von Dassanowsky. Austrian Cinema: A History. McFarland, 2005.
