= When the Bells Sound Clearly =

1959 film

- Directed by: Eduard von Borsody
- Written by: Kurt E. Walter; Eduard von Borsody
- Produced by: Eduard Hoesch
- Starring: Willy Birgel; Ellen Schwiers; Teddy Reno
- Cinematography: Hans Heinz Theyer
- Edited by: Hermine Diethelm
- Music by: Georg Gruber; Jean Villard
- Production company: Donau-Filmproduktion
- Distributed by: Neue Filmverleih
- Release date: 4 December 1959
- Running time: 90 minutes
- Country: Austria
- Language: German

When the Bells Sound Clearly (German: Wenn die Glocken hell erklingen) is a 1959 Austrian comedy drama film directed by Eduard von Borsody and starring Willy Birgel, Ellen Schwiers and Teddy Reno.

The film's sets were designed by the art director Hans Zehetner.

== Cast ==
- Willy Birgel as Graf von Warthenberg
- Ellen Schwiers as Susanne Weiden
- Teddy Reno as Singer
- Michael Ande as Michael
- Annie Rosar as Alma
- Loni von Friedl as Hanna
- Senta Wengraf as Maria
- Rudolf Carl as Der Polizist
- Hermann Thimig as Dr. Mersmann
- Lola Urban-Kneidinger as Frau Roesner
- Alfred Costas as Maxi
- Paul Horn as Bürgermeister
- Wiener Sängerknaben as Sängerknaben

== Bibliography ==
- Bergfelder, Tim & Bock, Hans-Michael. The Concise Cinegraph: Encyclopedia of German. Berghahn Books, 2009.
