= René Le Hénaff =

French film director

- Born: 24 April 1901
- Died: 5 January 2005
- Occupation(s): Film editor, film director

René Le Hénaff (24 April 1901 – 5 January 2005) was a French film editor and director. As a film editor he collaborated with directors Marcel Carné, René Clair, and Géza von Radványi among others. His three films with Carné in the late 1930s — Port of Shadows, Hôtel du Nord, and Le Jour Se Lève — are widely admired examples of poetic realism. He also directed films from 1935 to 1950. Perhaps the best-known is Colonel Chabert (1943), which was a film adaptation of a famous novella by Honoré de Balzac. Le Hénaff retired from filmmaking in 1968.

== Selected filmography ==
=== Editor ===
- The Shark (1930)
- Sous les toits de Paris (Under the Roofs of Paris) (1930)
- À Nous la Liberté (1931)
- Madame Makes Her Exit (1932)
- Bastille Day (1933)
- Le Scandal (The Scandal) (1934)
- Samson (1936)
- Le Quai des brumes (Port of Shadows) (1938)
- Hôtel du Nord (1938)
- Le Jour Se Lève (1939)
- Beating Heart (1940)
- The Lover of Borneo (1942)
- Le Quai des brumes (Women Without Names) (1950)
- L'Étrange Désir de monsieur Bard (Strange Desire of Mr. Bard) (1954)
- A Girl Without Boundaries (1955)
- Der Arzt von Stalingrad (The Doctor of Stalingrad) (1958)
- Twelve Hours by the Clock (1959)

=== Director ===
- Fort Dolorès (1939)
- The Lover of Borneo (1942)
- Colonel Chabert (1943)
- St. Val's Mystery (1945)
- Christine Gets Married (1946)
- Hoboes in Paradise (1946)
- The Husbands of Leontine (1947)
- Monsieur de Falindor (1947)
- Scandal (1948)
