= The Bandits of the Rio Grande =

1965 film

- Directed by: Helmuth M. Backhaus
- Written by: Helmuth M. Backhaus
- Starring: Harald Leipnitz; Maria Perschy; Wolfgang Kieling
- Cinematography: Manfred Ensinger
- Edited by: Anneliese Artelt
- Music by: Christian Bruhn
- Production company: Piran-Film
- Distributed by: Piran-Film
- Release date: 23 April 1965
- Running time: 89 minutes
- Country: West Germany
- Language: German

The Bandits of the Rio Grande (German: Die Banditen vom Rio Grande) is a 1965 West German modern day western film written and directed by Helmuth M. Backhaus and starring Harald Leipnitz, Maria Perschy and Wolfgang Kieling.

The film's sets were designed by the art director Nino Borghi. It was shot on location around Yugoslavia and in studios in Belgrade. It failed to recover its production costs at the box office, leading to the closure of its production company, Piran-Film, soon afterwards.

== Plot ==
Three young female teachers, Helen, Joan, and Lida, who have been transferred to a Mexican village, are kidnapped and harassed by bandits. The bandit leader, Barran, is prevented from going too far by his personal physician, Ryan, who sympathizes with the women.

== Cast ==
- Harald Leipnitz as Ryan
- Maria Perschy as Helen
- Wolfgang Kieling as Barran
- Gerlinde Locker as Joan
- Demeter Bitenc as Elgaut
- Uli Steigberg as Bill
- Rolf Arndt as Thouniak
- Laci Cigoj as Cardo
- Ellen Schwiers as Lida

== Bibliography ==
- Peter W. Schulze, Thomas Klein & Ivo Ritze. Crossing Frontiers: Intercultural Perspectives on the Western. Schüren Verlag, 2015.
