= Der Bulle von Tölz =

German television series

- Genre: Crime comedy
- Starring: Ottfried Fischer; Katerina Jacob; Katharina Abt; Ruth Drexel
- Country of origin: Germany
- Original language: German
- No. of episodes: 69

Production
- Running time: Feature-length episodes

Original release
- Network: Sat.1
- Release: 1996 – 2009

The Bull from/of Tölz (in German: Der Bulle von Tölz is a German television series which has been produced and broadcast by Sat.1 since 1996. As of January 2009, 69 self-contained feature-length episodes have been made.

== Genre ==
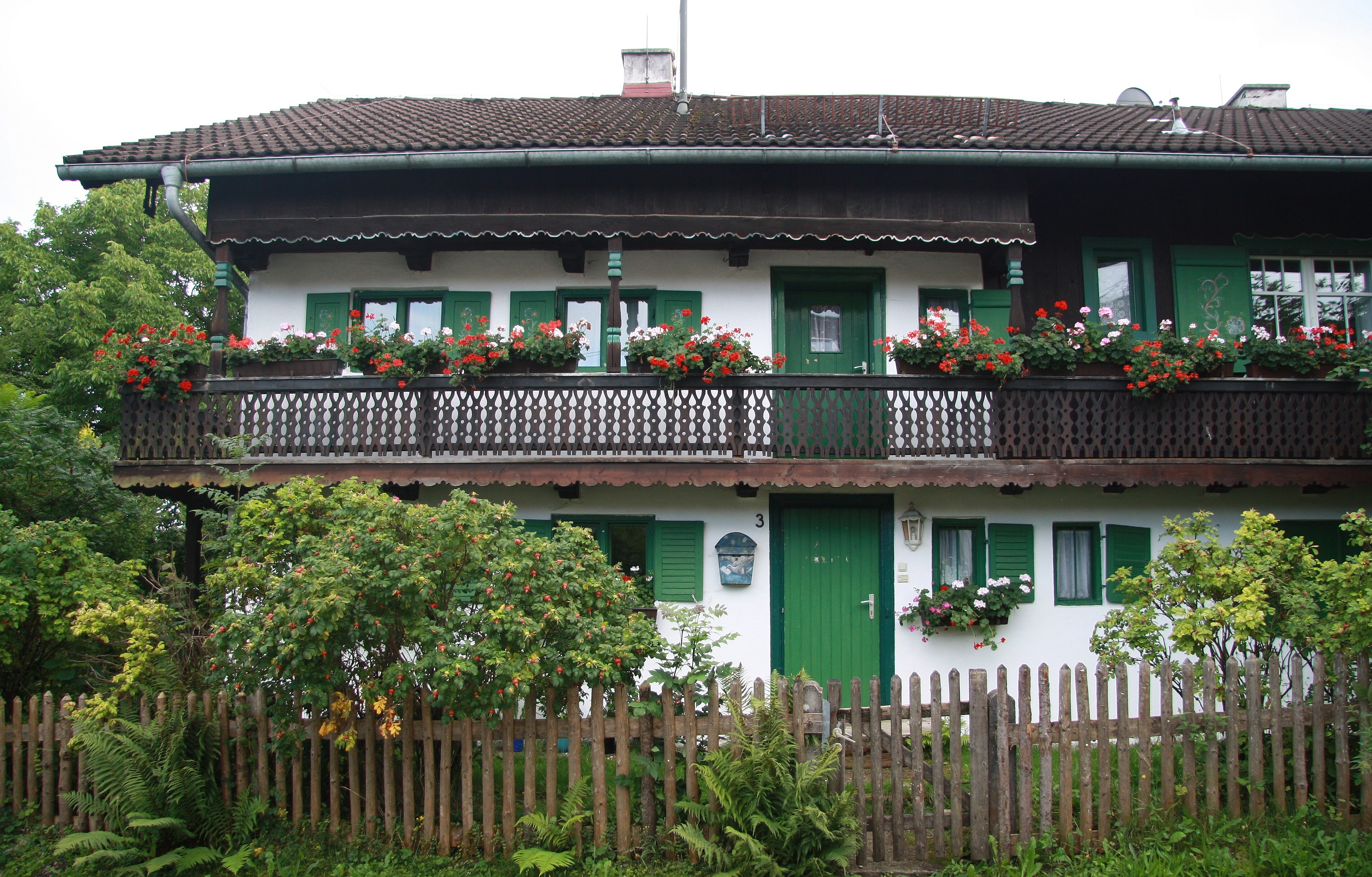
The Hollerhaus Irschenhausen is the filming location for the functional Pension Resi

Set in the small city of Bad Tölz in Upper Bavaria between Munich and the border to Austria, the series is about the activities of the local Kriminalpolizei as personified by Benno Berghammer (Ottfried Fischer), the eponymous Bulle (literally "bull", a German slang word for "policeman" much like "cop" in English, as well as an allusion to his bulky appearance), and Sabrina Lorenz (Katerina Jacob), two Kommissare who invariably, at the beginning of each episode, are faced with murder in the seemingly idyllic small town of Bad Tölz or its rural surroundings.

Generally, no violence is shown, and although the plot is always well constructed and the murder cases are always plausible and realistic, the huge popularity of the show is due to the underlying comedy which pervades each episode. Thus, most adult viewers derive more pleasure from the constellation of characters and the many running gags and one-liners delivered throughout the show than from following the plot or guessing who the murderer really is. The fact that much of the dialogue is performed in Bavarian rather than German equally lends familiarity to the characters (who are often played by Bavarian or Austrian actors).

== Recurring characters ==
In the first episode, Hauptkommissar Benno Berghammer is in his early forties. An only child and heavily overweight, he still lives with his widowed mother (a concept referred to as "Hotel Mum" in Germany) Theresia "Resi" Berghammer (Ruth Drexel), who is running a small bed and breakfast in Bad Tölz. Benno takes it for granted that his mother cooks for him (twice a day: he even returns home for lunch whenever possible) and that she washes his laundry and tidies up his room, but there is hardly anything he gives her in return. While Resi is proud of her son's success and achievements at his job, she does not approve of his bachelor lifestyle. Longing for a grandchild, she occasionally dabbles in matchmaking when she becomes aware of an eligible woman. But although her son has a penchant for attractive female suspects he only gets involved with women very rarely. The constant bickering between mother and son over all sorts of things is an ever-present running gag.

Sabrina Lorenz is a young Kommissarin hailing from Berlin. Single and unattached, she at first has a hard time adapting to the Bavarian traditions, customs and language: Not always able to understand, let alone speak, Bavarian, Lorenz is immediately recognized as a Zuagroaste (Bavarian for "immigrant", but used like "foreigner"), which is hardly an advantage in rural Bavaria where people from Berlin are still seen as Prussians. However, she knows what she wants, is good at her job and forms a perfect team with Berghammer, whom she likes to tease by calling him "Hase" (rabbit or hare).

Nadine Richter, played by Katharina Abt, replaced Sabrina Lorenz in 2006 as Benno Berghammer's police partner.

Other recurring characters include Wachtmeister Anton Pfeiffer (Udo Thomer), a naive, clumsy and slightly idiotic uniformed policeman and Anton "Toni" Rambold (Gerd Anthoff), an old schoolmate of Berghammer's who has become a (rather shady) tycoon in the local building trade and who represents capitalism in the series. Prelate Barthel Hinter (Michael Lerchenberg), the local Roman Catholic priest, and various local CSU politicians like the mayor of Bad Tölz, Franz Wegener, or the district administrator of Bad Tölz-Wolfratshausen, Siegfried Wallner, who are all portrayed more or less corrupt, also appear on a regular basis.

Actor Udo Thomer died suddenly in January 2006. Following the death of actress Ruth Drexel in February 2009, SAT1 announced to not produce any more new episodes.

== Topics ==
In Der Bulle von Tölz, a fair amount of social criticism is presented in a humorous way. For example, double standards of morality are frequently thematized (the Catholic Church doing business with shady land developers and thus potentially harming the environment; members of the clergy associating with prostitutes; Bavaria's political élite—invariably CSU— hypocritically claiming they only want what is best for the citizens; etc.). Also, current fads (the Internet craze, valuable antiques, Feng Shui, cosmetic surgery, etc.) are often taken up. Finally, several murder cases revolve around traditional, rural subjects (rivalry between farmers, poaching, sports events, class reunions, rivalry between villages etc.).
