= Sergeant Berry (TV series) =

- Directed by: Harald Philipp
- Starring: Klausjürgen Wussow; Harald Juhnke
- Music by: Peter Thomas
- No. of episodes: 26

Production
- Producer: Heinz Willeg

Original release
- Release: 1974 – 1975

Sergeant Berry is a fictional American police officer. The first stories published about him were novels written by an author named Robert Arden. In 1938 there was already a German film called Sergeant Berry starring Hans Albers. After World War II some of the novels about Sergeant Berry were published again.

The German TV series of the same name was broadcast in 1974 and 1975 and lasted for 26 episodes. When Klausjürgen Wussow left the series he was replaced by the likewise popular actor and comedian Harald Juhnke.

The series was produced by Heinz Willeg and directed by Harald Philipp who had already worked together on the early films about Jerry Cotton. Peter Thomas provided the music score.
