= Harald Philipp =

German director, screenwriter and actor

Harald Phillip
- Born: 24 March 1921; Hamburg, Germany
- Died: 5 July 1999 (aged 78); Berlin, Germany
- Occupation: Film director
- Years active: 1953–1987

Harald Philipp (1921–1999) was a German film director, screenwriter and actor.

== Selected filmography ==
- The Old Forester House (1956)
- Bimbo the Great (1958)
- The Csardas King (1958)
- A Thousand Stars Aglitter (1959)
- Strafbataillon 999 (1960)
- Brandenburg Division (1960)
- Auf Wiedersehen (1961)
- Blind Justice (1961)
- The Oil Prince (1965)
- Manhattan Night of Murder (1965)
- The Trap Snaps Shut at Midnight (1966)
- Winnetou and the Crossbreed (1966)
- Love Nights in the Taiga (1967)
- Death Knocks Twice (1969)
- The Body in the Thames (1971)
- Hurray We Are Bachelors Again (1971)
- Der Fall Opa (1972, TV film)
- Ausbruch (1973, TV film)
- Sergeant Berry (1974–1975, TV series)
- Die Brücke von Zupanja (1975)
- Die Protokolle des Herrn M. (1979, TV series)
- Der Fuchs von Övelgönne (1981, TV series)
- Kreisbrandmeister Felix Martin (1982, TV series)
