= Katerina Jacob =

German actress (born 1958)

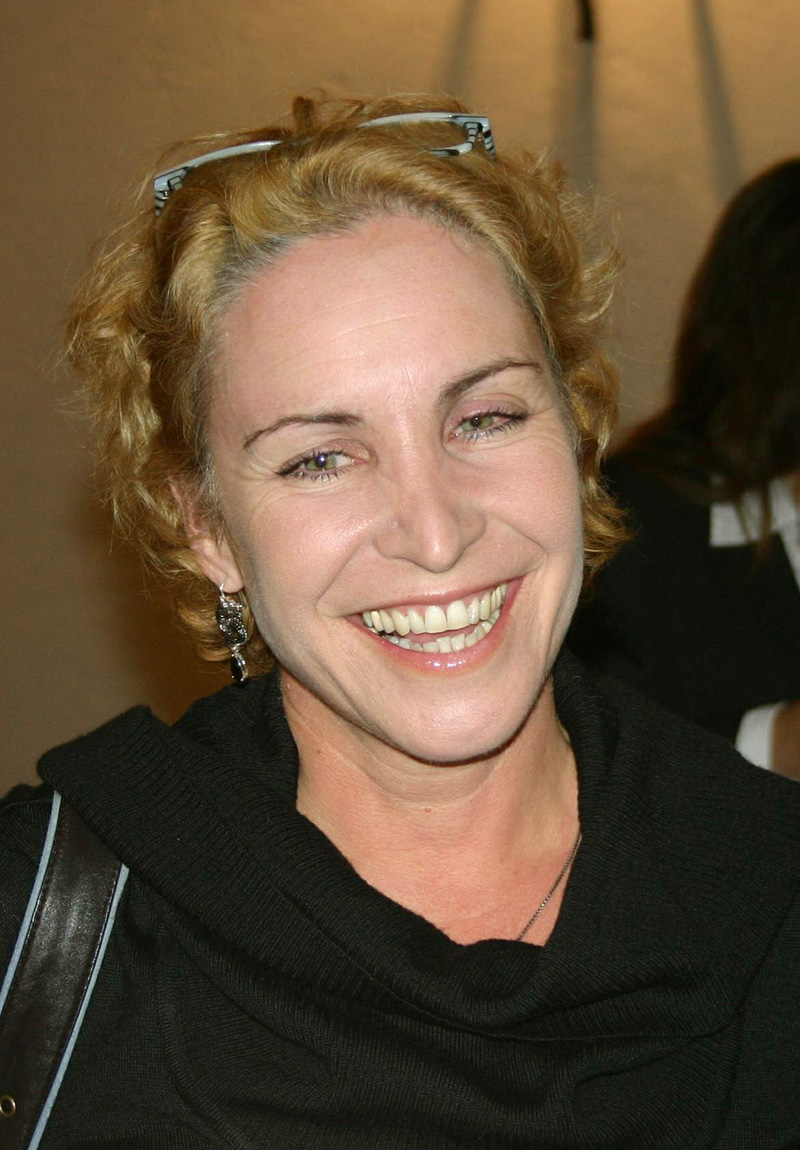
- Jacob in 2007
- Born: 1 March 1958 (age 67); Munich, Bavaria, West Germany
- Occupation: Actress
- Spouse: Oliver Hengst (m. 1997; div. 2002)
- Children: Josephine Jacob
- Parent: Ellen Schwiers

Katerina Jacob (born 1 March 1958 in Munich) is a German actress. In addition to German citizenship she also holds Canadian citizenship.

== Life and career ==
Jacob comes from an artistic family: her mother was the actress Ellen Schwiers, her father was film producer Peter Jacob. Her late younger brother Daniel Jacob (1963-1985) worked as an actor, her uncle Holger Schwiers is also an actor and voice actor. Through her mother, Jacob came to the age of 15 for her first role in the TV miniseries The Red Scarf. In 1977 she became known nationwide with her first title role as Grete Minde. Later, she went to the prestigious Institute of Lee Strasberg in New York City for acting training, and in 1980 received her first stage engagement as Gretchen in Faust I at the Bad Hersfelder Festspiele. To this day, she always finds time for guest performances with touring theaters.

In addition, Jacob played numerous roles in film and television, including Derrick, The Black Forest Clinic, Eurocops and a starring role in the series Alle meine Töchter. She was particularly popular in her role as Detective Inspector Sabrina Lorenz in the series Der Bulle von Tölz, in which the native Bavarian from 1995 to 2005 next to Ottfried Fischer played a Berliner.

Katerina Jacob was the German dubbing voice of Elizabeth Hurley (Austin Powers: International Man of Mystery and Austin Powers: The Spy Who Shagged Me and Emma Thompson (Much Ado About Nothing and Howards End). She also performs on the cabaret stage with her solo program The Mysteries of Love or the Eerie Phenomenon of Testosterone.

In 1977, Jacob studied painting at the Munich Academy of Fine Arts. She returned to this subject in Canada in 1998 and has been successfully painting ever since.

In 2012 she participated in the seventh season of Dancing Stars, where she retired in the first round. In 2013 she toured with her stage play Sara is under the hood. She played the role of Sara Hastings. Her mother Ellen Schwiers stood with her on the stage, she embodied her energetic Aunt Martha.

== Personal life ==
From 1997 until her divorce in 2002, Jacob was married to director Oliver Hengst. For several years she has been living with the German-Canadian broker Jochen Neumann. They married in September 2011. Her daughter Josephine Jacob (born September 30, 1981) is in long-term relationship with Canadian actor Roger Cross.
