= Maria von Tasnady =

Hungarian actress (1911–2001)

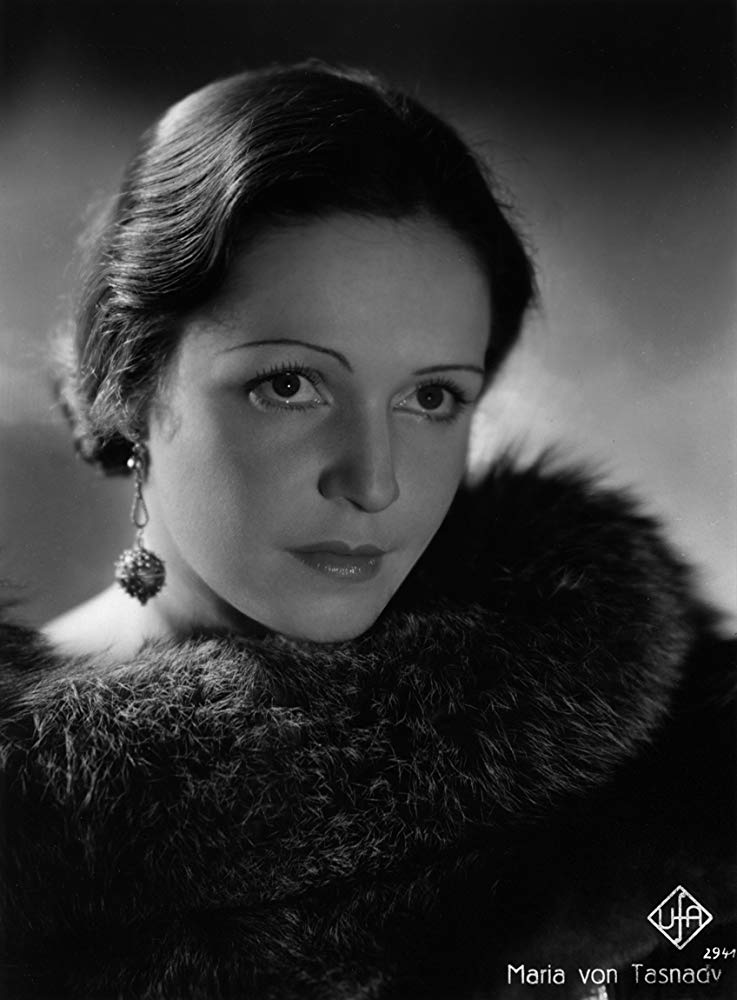
- Maria von Tasnady in 1939
- Born: Mária Tasnádi Fekete; 16 November 1911; Lónyaytelep, Kingdom of Hungary, Austria-Hungary
- Died: 16 March 2001 (aged 89); Munich, Bavaria, Germany
- Other name: Maria De Tasnady
- Occupations: Actress; singer
- Years active: 1932–1957 (film)

Maria von Tasnady (16 November 1911 – 16 March 2001) was a Hungarian singer, stage and film actress. She was born as Mária Tasnádi Fekete and used a variety of other professional names including Maria De Tasnady during her career.

Von Tasnady was born to ethnically Hungarian parents in Transylvania when it was still part of Austria-Hungary. Following its transfer to Romania after World War I, she emigrated to Hungary. She was the Hungarian entrant at the 1931 Miss Europe contest, losing out to the French winner. Moving to Germany, she made her film debut in 1932.

Von Tasnady appeared in twenty five films during her career. As well as Germany, she also worked in her native Hungary and Italy where she appeared in the patriotic war film Bengasi in 1942. Following the Second World War, she was employed by Radio Free Europe. She was married to the film producer Bruno Duday.

== Selected filmography ==
- When Love Sets the Fashion (1932)
- Kind Stepmother (1935)
- Final Chord (1936)
- Men Without a Fatherland (1937)
- The Five-Forty (1939)
- Woman Without a Past (1939)
- Castle in Transylvania (1940)
- Closed Court (1940)
- Sarajevo (1940)
- Alarm (1941)
- Europe Doesn't Answer (1941)
- Bengasi (1942)
- The Talking Robe (1942)
- A Woman Looks Back (1942)
- Yellow Hell (1942)
- The Young Caruso (1951)
- André and Ursula (1955)

== Bibliography ==
- Gundle, Stephen. Mussolini's Dream Factory: Film Stardom in Fascist Italy. Berghahn Books, 2013.
