= Géza von Radványi =

Hungarian filmmaker (1907–1986)

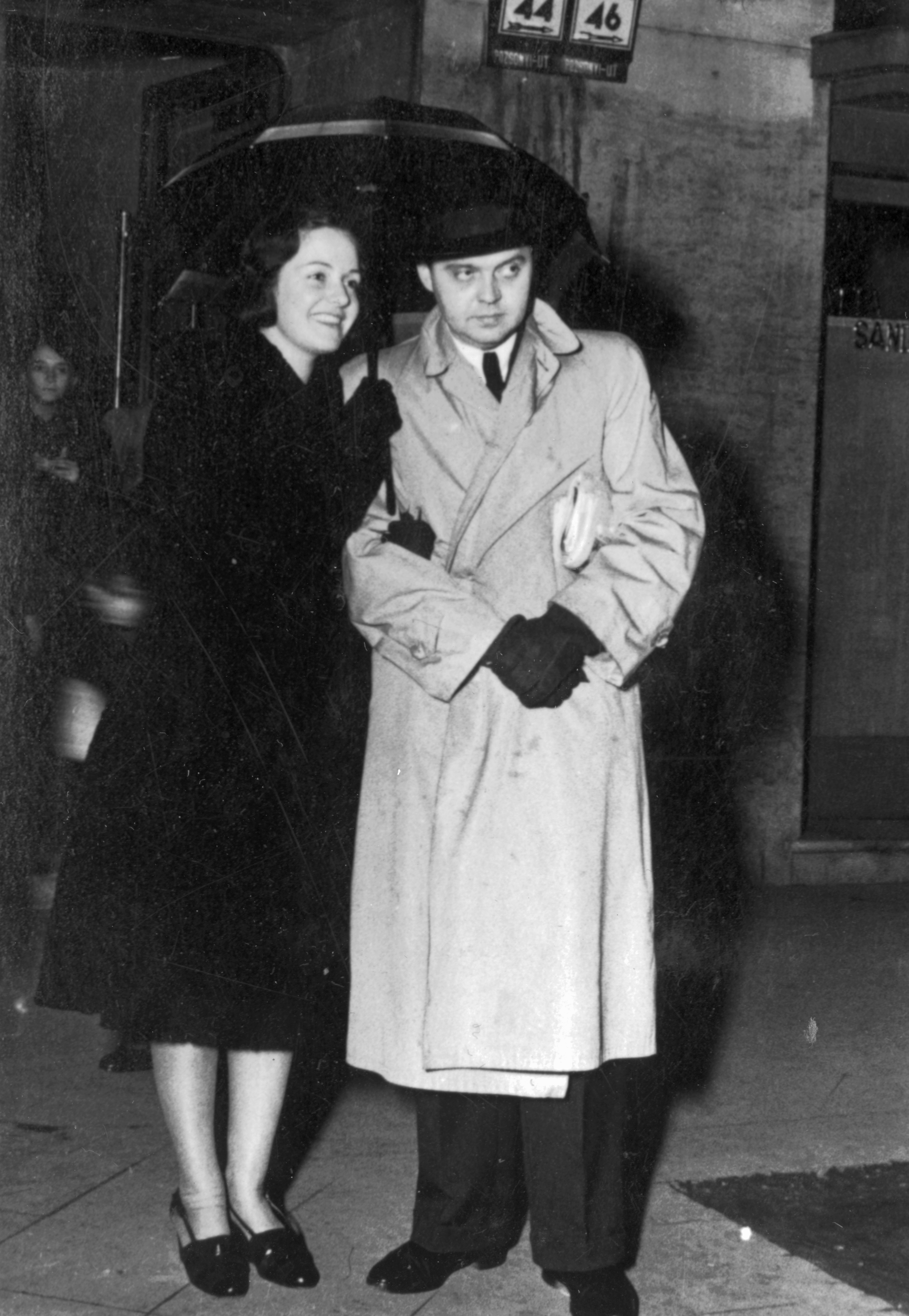
- Radványi and his wife Maria von Tasnády
- Born: Géza Grosschmid; 26 September 1907; Kassa, Kingdom of Hungary, Austria-Hungary
- Died: 27 November 1986 (aged 79); Budapest, Hungary
- Occupation: Film director
- Years active: 1947–1980
- Spouses: Eva Marie Daghofer (m. 1930; div. 1937) Maria von Tasnady (m. 1937)

Géza von Radványi (born Géza Grosschmid; 26 September 1907 – 27 November 1986) was a Hungarian film director, cinematographer, producer and writer.

== Biography ==
Born Géza Grosschmid, he took the name Radványi from his paternal grandmother. His brother was the writer Sándor Márai. Géza von Radványi made his debut in journalism before moving to cinema in 1941. He aimed to create a popular cinema in the 1950s and 1960s that would rival Hollywood studios, due to European coproductions.

He began at the end of the 1940s, with Somewhere in Europe and Women Without Names, neorealist dramas with no concession to the ravages of war and the postwar period. During the 1950s, Radványi changed his style: L'Étrange Désir de monsieur Bard, with Michel Simon and Geneviève Page (1953), and, above all, the success of his remake of Mädchen in Uniform with Lilli Palmer and the young rising star Romy Schneider (1958). He also made in the same decade Twelve Hours By the Clock, a thriller based on a script by Boileau and Narcejac, with Lino Ventura and Laurent Terzieff, as well as a slapstick comedy, An Angel on Wheels with Romy Schneider and Henri Vidal (1959).

During the 1960s, he became both more ambitious and more bankable, making 70 mm coproductions like Uncle Tom's Cabin with Mylène Demongeot and Herbert Lom (1965), and Congress of Love with Lilli Palmer, Curd Jürgens, Paul Meurisse and Françoise Arnoul (1966), both of which were rather unsuccessful.

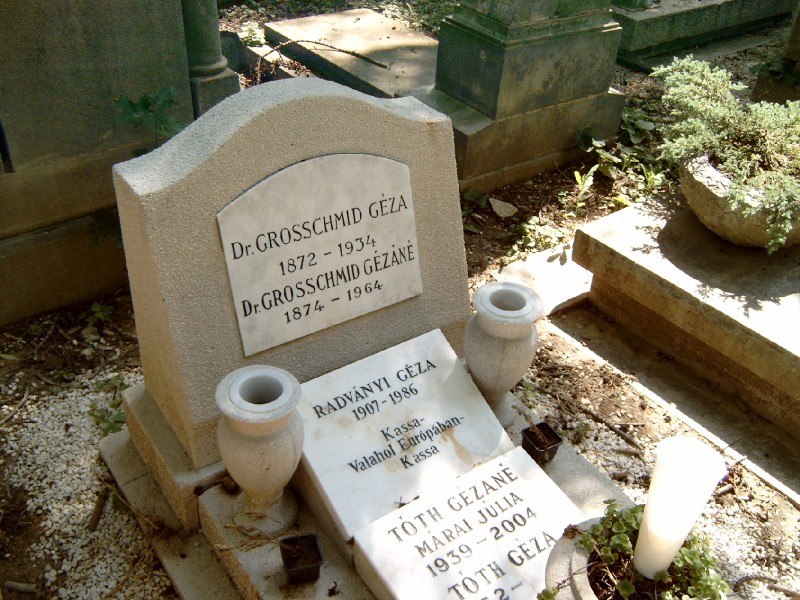
The tomb of Géza von Radványi in Budapest.

In contrast, he surprisingly wrote the script for the successful film produced by Louis de Funès, L'homme orchestre, directed by Serge Korber (1970). His 1961 film Das Riesenrad was entered into the 2nd Moscow International Film Festival. His 1965 film Uncle Tom's Cabin was entered into the 4th Moscow International Film Festival.

Géza von Radványi ended his career with a modest production made in his home country, Circus Maximus (1980).

== Selected filmography ==
- Closed Court (1940)
- Sarajevo (1940)
- Castle in Transylvania (1940)
- Europe Doesn't Answer (1941)
- Yellow Hell (1942)
- The Talking Robe (1942)
- A Woman Looks Back (1942)
- Somewhere in Europe (1947), with Artúr Somlay and Miklós Gábor
- Women Without Names (1950), with Simone Simon and Françoise Rosay
- L'Étrange Désir de monsieur Bard (1953), with Michel Simon and Geneviève Page
- A Girl Without Boundaries (1955), with Sonja Ziemann and Ivan Desny
- Ingrid (1955), with Johanna Matz and Paul Hubschmid
- Das Schloß in Tirol (1957), with Karlheinz Böhm
- The Doctor of Stalingrad (1958), with O. E. Hasse, Eva Bartok, Hannes Messemer and Mario Adorf
- Mädchen in Uniform (1958), with Romy Schneider and Lilli Palmer
- Twelve Hours By the Clock (1959), with Lino Ventura, Laurent Terzieff, Hannes Messemer, Eva Bartok and Gert Fröbe
- An Angel on Wheels (1959), with Romy Schneider and Henri Vidal
- Ich schwöre und gelobe (1960), with Wolfgang Lukschy and Hans Christian Blech
- Und sowas nennt sich Leben (1961), with Elke Sommer and Karin Baal
- Das Riesenrad (1961), with Maria Schell and O. W. Fischer
- It Can't Always Be Caviar (1961), with O. W. Fischer, Jean Richard, Eva Bartok and Senta Berger
- This Time It Must Be Caviar (1961), with O. W. Fischer, Jean Richard, Eva Bartok and Senta Berger
- Uncle Tom's Cabin (1965), with John Kitzmiller, Mylène Demongeot, Juliette Gréco, Herbert Lom and O. W. Fischer
- Congress of Love (1966), with Curd Jürgens, Lilli Palmer, Hannes Messemer, Paul Meurisse and Françoise Arnoul
- Circus Maximus (1980), with Ági Margittay and Antal Páger

== Bibliography ==
He published many crime novels under the pseudonym Géza Radvany :

- 16 Heures au Paradis, novel, Éditions de Trévise, Paris, 1974.
- Troubles, novel, Éditions de Trévise, Paris, 1975. ISBN 2711202895
- Les Otages de la nuit, novel, Éditions de Trévise, Paris, 1976. ISBN 2-7112-0314-X
- Chantage sur canapé, novel, Éditions de Trévise, Paris, 1978. ISBN 2-7112-0326-3
- Drames de dames, novel, Éditions de Trévise, Paris, 1980. ISBN 2-7112-0400-6

== Notes ==
- René Barjavel:
  Géza von Radványi est non-seulement un des plus grands créateurs du cinéma mondial, mais avant, et au-dessus, cet être rare, fabuleux, presque invraisemblable : un homme fraternel
  .
