= Heidi Genée =

German film director

- Born: 22 October 1938; Berlin, Germany
- Died: 26 September 2005 (aged 66); Munich, Germany
- Occupations: Film editor, director, screenwriter
- Years active: 1958–1984

Heidi Genée (22 October 1938 – 26 September 2005) was a German film editor, director and screenwriter. She worked on more than 40 films between 1958 and 1984. Her 1977 film Grete Minde was entered into the 27th Berlin International Film Festival. Five years later, her film Kraftprobe was entered into the 32nd Berlin International Film Festival.

== Selected filmography ==
- Horrors of Spider Island (1960 - directed by Fritz Böttger)
- Brutality in Stone (1961 - directed by Alexander Kluge and Peter Schamoni), short documentary
- Dicke Luft (1962 - directed by Rolf von Sydow)
- Tonio Kröger (1964 - directed by Rolf Thiele)
- The River Line (1964)
- Golden Goddess of Rio Beni (1964)
- It (1966 - directed by Ulrich Schamoni)
- No Shooting Time for Foxes (1966 - directed by Peter Schamoni)
- Girls, Girls (1967 - directed by Roger Fritz)
- Next Year, Same Time (1967 - directed by Ulrich Schamoni)
- Jet Generation (1968 - directed by Eckhart Schmidt)
- Quartett im Bett (1968 - directed by Ulrich Schamoni)
- Your Caresses (1969 - directed by Peter Schamoni and Herbert Vesely)
- We Two (1970 - directed by Ulrich Schamoni)
- Love, Vampire Style (1970 - directed by Helmut Förnbacher)
- Butterflies Don't Cry (1970 - directed by Klaus Überall)
- I Love You, I Kill You (1971 - directed by Uwe Brandner)
- Hundertwasser's Rainy Day (1971 - directed by Peter Schamoni), short documentary
- Eins (1971 - directed by Ulrich Schamoni)
- Strange City (1972 - directed by Rudolf Thome)
- Kopf oder Zahl (1973 - directed by Uwe Brandner)
- Zahltag (1973 - directed by Hans Noever)
- La Victoria (1973 - directed by Peter Lilienthal)
- Hau drauf, Kleiner (1974 - directed by May Spils)
- Output (1974, directed by Michael Fengler)
- Schoolmaster Hofer (1975, directed by Peter Lilienthal)
- Lina Braake (1975 - directed by Bernhard Sinkel)
- John Glückstadt (1975 - directed by Ulf Miehe)
- Berlinger (1975 - directed by Bernhard Sinkel and Alf Brustellin)
- North Sea Is Dead Sea (1976 - directed by Hark Bohm)
- Strongman Ferdinand (1976 - directed by Alexander Kluge)
- Grete Minde (1977 - directed by Heidi Genée)
- 1+1=3 [de] (1979 - directed by Heidi Genée)
- Sting in the Flesh (1981 - directed by Heidi Genée)
- Kraftprobe (1982 - directed by Heidi Genée)
- Flucht nach vorn (1983 - directed by Heidi Genée)
- Marlene (1984 - directed by Maximilian Schell), documentary
- Eine Reise nach Deutschland (1987, TV film - directed by Heidi Genée)
- Der Unsichtbare (1987 - directed by Ulf Miehe)
- Pfarrerin Lenau (1990–1991, TV series)
