= 32nd Berlin International Film Festival =

1982 film festival in West Berlin, Germany

- Festival poster
- Location: West Berlin, Germany
- Founded: 1951
- Awards: Golden Bear: Veronika Voss
- No. of films: 300 films
- Festival date: 12–23 February 1982
- Website: http://www.berlinale.de

Berlin International Film Festival chronology
- 33rd 31st

The 32nd annual Berlin International Film Festival was held from 12–23 February 1982. The Golden Bear was awarded to Veronika Voss directed by Rainer Werner Fassbinder.

The Honorary Golden Bear (Goldener Ehrenbär) was introduced for the first time in this edition to pay tribute to important figures in the world of film. The award has been presented for an exceptional artistic career and is given to the guest of honour of the Homage. In this edition it was awarded to American actor James Stewart.

A new section was introduced at the festival by Manfred Salzgeber, which was renamed Panorama in 1986. The retrospective dedicated to German film director Curtis Bernhardt titled Insurrection of Emotions along with East German children's films of the 50-70s in collaboration with the DEFA.

== Juries ==
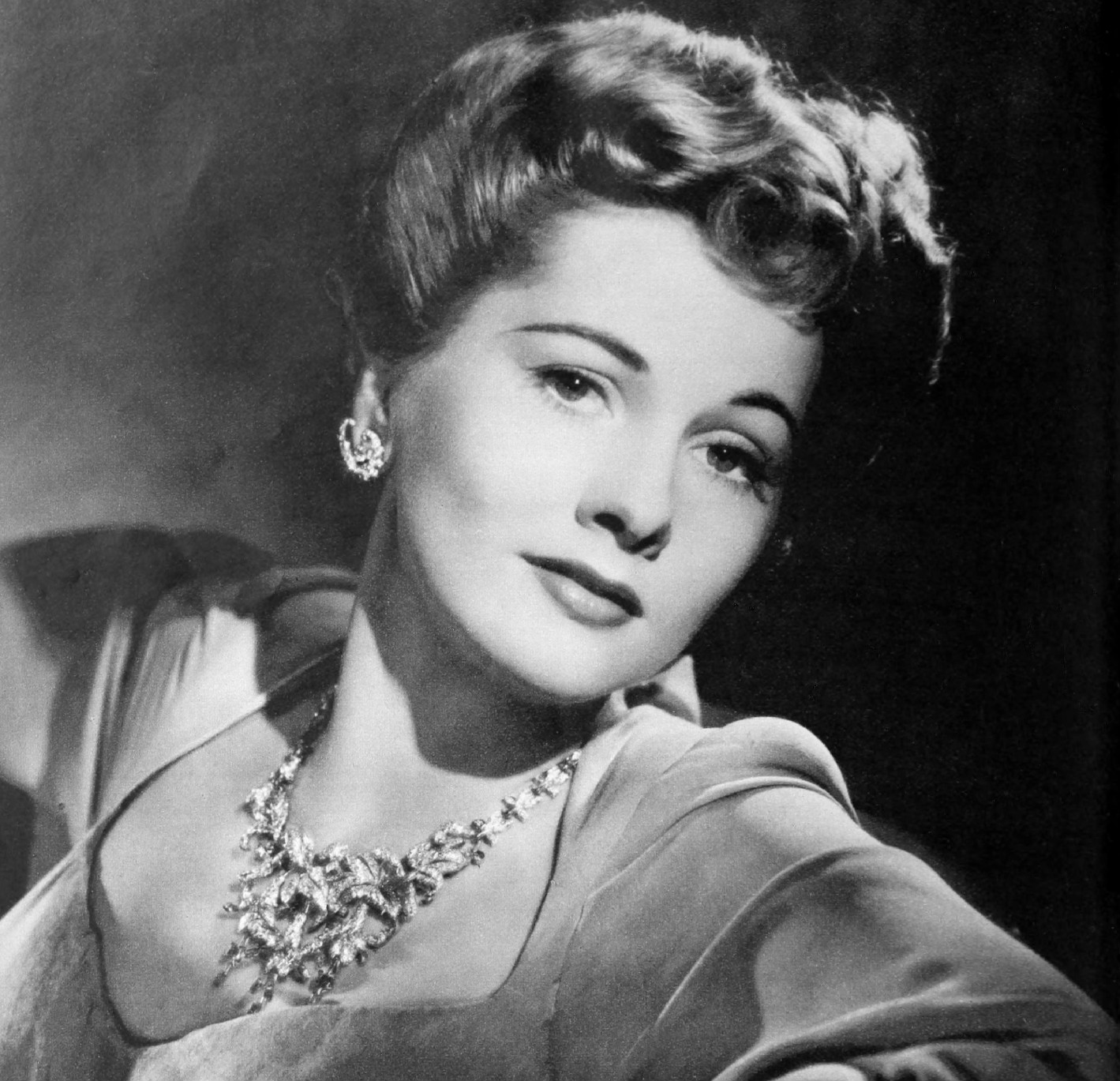
Joan Fontaine, Jury President

The following people were announced as being on the jury for the festival:

=== Main Competition ===
- Joan Fontaine, American actress - Jury President
- Vladimir Baskakov, Soviet filmmaker, writer and politician
- Brigitte Fossey, French actress
- Joe Hembus, German film critic and film historian
- László Lugossy, Hungarian director
- Gian Luigi Rondi, Italian film critic
- Helma Sanders-Brahms, German director, screenwriter and producer
- Mrinal Sen, Indian director, screenwriter and producer
- David Stratton, Australian film critic and film historian

== Official Sections ==
=== Main Competition ===
The following films were in competition for the Golden Bear award:

English title	Original title	Director(s)	Production Country
Absence of Malice		Sydney Pollack	United States
An Unsuitable Job for a Woman		Chris Petit	United Kingdom
Beirut the Encounter	Beyroutou el lika	Borhane Alaouié	Lebanon
Bürgschaft für ein Jahr		Herrmann Zschoche	East Germany
Eine deutsche Revolution		Helmut Herbst	West Germany
Farewell to the Land	さらば愛しき大地	Mitsuo Yanagimachi	Japan
The Girl with the Red Hair	Het meisje met het rode haar	Ben Verbong	Netherlands
The Killing of Angel Street		Donald Crombie	Australia
L'amour des femmes		Michel Soutter	Switzerland
Longing for My Native Country	乡情	Hu Bingliu, Wang Jin	China
Il Marchese del Grillo		Mario Monicelli	Italy
Muzhiki!	Мужики!	Iskra Babich	Soviet Union
Repeat Dive	צלילה חוזרת	Shimon Dotan	Israel
Requiem		Zoltán Fábri	Hungary
Romance with Amelie	Romanze mit Amelie	Ulrich Thein	East Germany
Shivers	Dreszcze	Wojciech Marczewski	Poland
The Simple-Minded Murder	Den Enfaldige Mördaren	Hasse Alfredson	Sweden
Strange Affair	Une étrange affaire	Pierre Granier-Deferre	France
Veronika Voss	Die Sehnsucht der Veronika Voss	Rainer Werner Fassbinder	West Germany
Willful Murder	日本の熱い日々 謀殺・下山事件	Kei Kumai	Japan

=== Out of Competition ===
English title	Original title	Director(s)	Production country
A Thousand Billion Dollars	Mille milliards de dollars	Henri Verneuil	France
Butterfly		Matt Cimber	United States
Coup de Torchon		Bertrand Tavernier	France
Großstadtzigeuner		Irmgard von zur Mühlen	West Germany
High Society Limited	Feine Gesellschaft - beschränkte Haftung	Ottokar Runze	West Germany
Kraftprobe		Heidi Genée	West Germany
Liebeskonzil		Werner Schroeter	West Germany
Whose Life Is It Anyway?		John Badham	United States

=== Retrospective and Homage ===
The following films were shown in the retrospective "Insurrection of Emotions: Curtis Bernhardt":

English title	Original title	Director	Production Country
A Stolen Life		Curtis Bernhardt	United States
Beau Brummell		Curtis Bernhardt	United Kingdom, United States
Conflict		Curtis Bernhardt	United States
The Last Fort	Das letzte Fort	Curtis Bernhardt	Germany
The Man Who Murdered	Der Mann, der den Mord beging	Curtis Bernhardt	Germany
The Rebel	Der Rebell	Curtis Bernhardt	Germany
The Tunnel	Der Tunnel	Curtis Bernhardt	Germany
Devotion		Curtis Bernhardt	United States
The Woman One Longs For	Die Frau, nach der man sich sehnt	Curtis Bernhardt	Germany
The Last Company	Die letzte Kompagnie	Curtis Bernhardt	Germany
Orphan of Lowood	Die Waise von Lowood	Curtis Bernhardt	Germany
Gaby		Curtis Bernhardt	United States
High Wall		Curtis Bernhardt	United States
Interrupted Melody		Curtis Bernhardt	United States
Juke Girl		Curtis Bernhardt	United States
Children's Souls Accuse You	Kinderseelen klagen euch an	Curtis Bernhardt	Germany
Kisses for My President		Curtis Bernhardt	United States
Lady with Red Hair		Curtis Bernhardt	United States
The Tunnel	Le Tunnel	Curtis Bernhardt	France, Germany
Million Dollar Baby		Curtis Bernhardt	United States
Miss Sadie Thompson		Curtis Bernhardt	United States
My Love Came Back		Curtis Bernhardt	United States
My Reputation		Curtis Bernhardt	United States
Payment on Demand		Curtis Bernhardt	United States
Possessed		Curtis Bernhardt	United States
The Prince of Rogues	Schinderhannes	Curtis Bernhardt	Germany
Sirocco		Curtis Bernhardt	United States
The Blue Veil		Curtis Bernhardt	United States
The Doctor and the Girl		Curtis Bernhardt	United States

The following films were shown in the retrospective "East German Children's Films":

English title	Original title	Director(s)	Production Country
Heart of Stone	Das kalte Herz	Paul Verhoeven	East Germany
Das Pferdemädchen		Egon Schlegel	East Germany
Der tapfere Schulschwänzer		Heiner Carow	East Germany
Die Fahrt nach Bamsdorf		Klaus Georgi and Otto Sacher	East Germany
Die Reise nach Sundevit		Heiner Carow	East Germany
The Sons of Great Bear	Die Söhne der großen Bärin	Josef Mach	East Germany
Ehret die Frauen		Klaus Georgi and Otto Sacher	East Germany
Ikarus		Heiner Carow	East Germany
Mohr und die Raben von London		Helmut Dziuba	East Germany
Philipp, der Kleine		Herrmann Zschoche	East Germany
Sie nannten ihn Amigo		Heiner Carow	East Germany
Vater als Studienhilfe		Otto Sacher	East Germany
Vaters große Liebe		Klaus Georgi	East Germany
Vater und die Mathematik		Otto Sacher	East Germany
Wie heiratet man einen König?		Rainer Simon	East Germany

The following films were shown in the homage to James Stewart:

English title	Original title	Director(s)	Country
Anatomy of a Murder		Otto Preminger	United States
Born to Dance		Roy Del Ruth	United States
Call Northside 777		Henry Hathaway	United States
Destry Rides Again		George Marshall	United States
It's a Wonderful Life		Frank Capra	United States
The Glenn Miller Story		Anthony Mann	United States
The Man Who Shot Liberty Valance		John Ford	United States
The Naked Spur		Anthony Mann	United States
The Philadelphia Story		George Cukor	United States
The Shop Around the Corner		Ernst Lubitsch	United States
The Spirit of St. Louis		Billy Wilder	United States
The Stratton Story		Sam Wood	United States
Winchester '73		Anthony Mann	United States

The film Berlin: Die Sinfonie der Großstadt by Walter Ruttmann was also shown in the retrospective.

== Official Awards ==
The following prizes were awarded by the Jury:

- Golden Bear: Veronika Voss by Rainer Werner Fassbinder
- Silver Bear – Special Jury Prize: Shivers by Wojciech Marczewski
- Silver Bear for Best Director: Mario Monicelli for Il Marchese del Grillo
- Silver Bear for Best Actress: Katrin Saß for Bürgschaft für ein Jahr
- Silver Bear for Best Actor:
  - Michel Piccoli for Strange Affair
  - Stellan Skarsgård for The Simple-Minded Murderer
- Silver Bear for an outstanding single achievement: Zoltán Fábri for Requiem
- Honourable Mention:
  - Muzhiki!
  - Absence of Malice
  - The Killing of Angel Street

=== Honorary Golden Bear ===
- James Stewart

== Independent Awards ==
=== FIPRESCI Award ===
- Dreszcze by Wojciech Marczewski
