= Kier-La Janisse =

Canadian screenwriter, director, producer and programmer

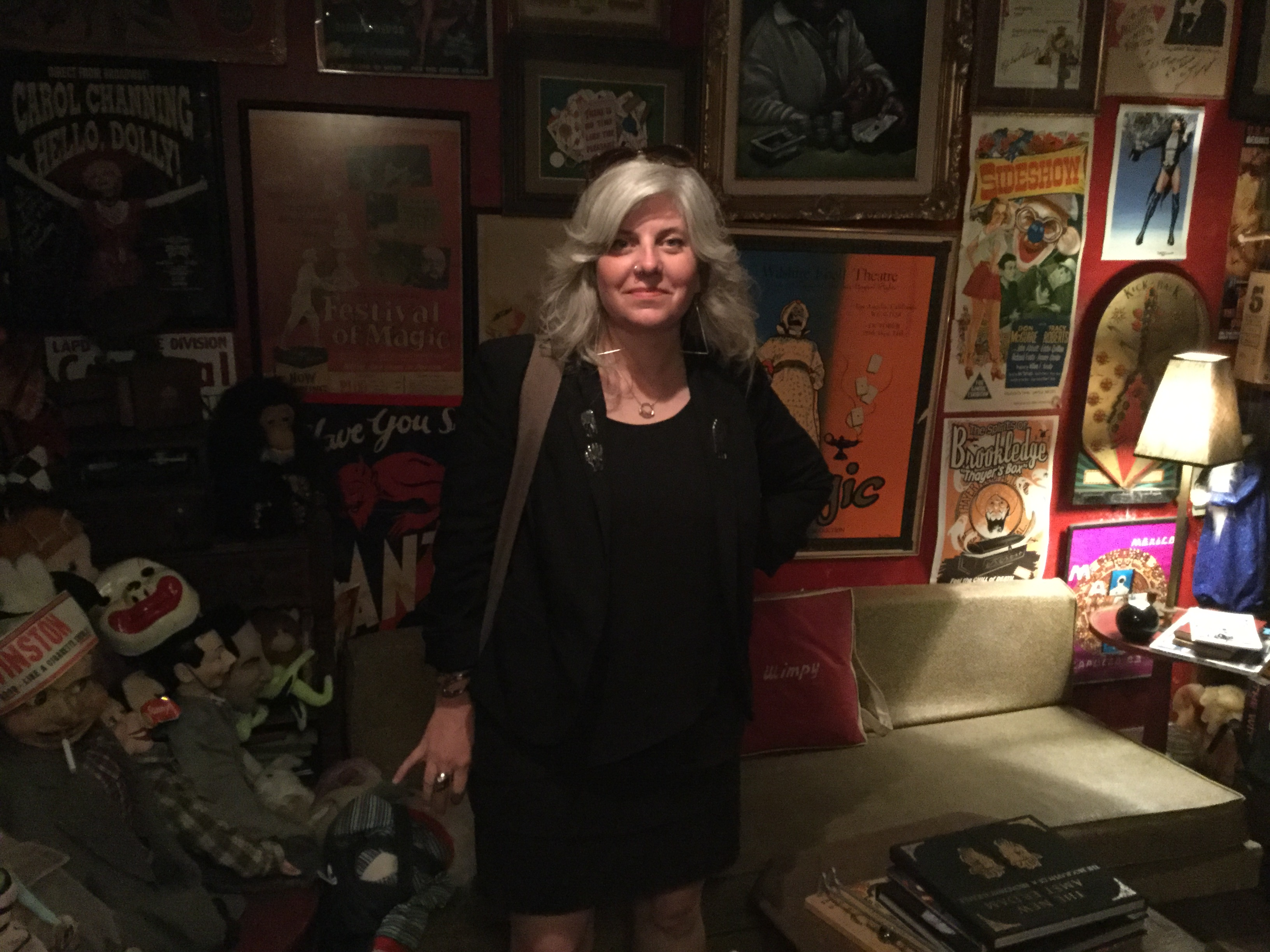
- Born: October 3, 1972 (age 53)
- Occupations: Film writer; film programmer; producer; director
- Known for: Woodlands Dark and Days Bewitched: A History of Folk Horror, House of Psychotic Women: An Autobiographical Topography of Female Neurosis in Horror and Exploitation Films, The Miskatonic Institute of Horror Studies
- Website: kierlajanisse.com

Kier-La Janisse (born October 3, 1972) is a Canadian film writer, programmer, producer, and founder of The Miskatonic Institute of Horror Studies. Her best-known work as a writer is House of Psychotic Women: An Autobiographical Topography of Female Neurosis in Horror and Exploitation Films (FAB Press, 2012) which many critics consider an important milestone in both confessional film writing and the study of female madness onscreen. Video Watchdog’s Tim Lucas referred to it as one of the 10 “most vital” horror film books of all time, and Ian MacAllister-McDonald of the LA Review of Books called it “the next step in genre theory, as well as the most frightening and heart-rending memoir I’ve read in years.” Her debut feature as a filmmaker, the three-hour documentary Woodlands Dark and Days Bewitched: A History of Folk Horror, premiered at SXSW 2021 where it won the Midnighters Audience Award.

== Film and event programming ==
In 1999, Janisse mounted the first CineMuerte Film Festival in Vancouver, an independent horror film festival that ran until 2005, first at microcinema The Blinding Light!! and moving to the Pacific Cinematheque after its first year. Special guests of the festival included Jean Rollin, Jörg Buttgereit, Udo Kier, Buddy Giovinazzo, John Saxon, Richard Blackburn, Jack Taylor, Jeff Lieberman, Jim Van Bebber, Edwin Neal and more. The festival and Janisse’s struggles to run it independently were the subject of Ashley Fester’s documentary feature Celluloid Horror (2005).

She was Head Programmer for the Alamo Drafthouse Cinema from 2003-2007, an original programmer for Fantastic Fest (2005-2007, returning to oversee short film programming 2012-2014), and a co-founder of its MONDO collectible merchandising branch. As part of her Alamo programming she founded Music Mondays, a weekly series of music documentaries that garnered her an award from The Austin Chronicle. In 2003, inspired by her friend Toren Atkinson’s birthday cartoon marathons, she founded the Saturday Morning All-You-Can-Eat-Cereal Cartoon Party, a program of vintage cartoons, commercials, PSAs and Station IDs intended to replicate the Saturday morning experience in a theatrical environment. The program was originated in Vancouver and she brought the program to the Alamo Drafthouse Cinema in Austin, Texas where it was a staple for many years, in addition to screening regularly in many cities worldwide.

In 2003, she founded the Bloodshots 48-Hour Filmmaking Challenge, an annual independent filmmaking contest in Vancouver that ran until 2012.

In 2006, she mounted the Big Smash! Music-on-Film festival in Vancouver, named after the album by Wreckless Eric. She continued to use the Big Smash! moniker to mount independent screenings over the years, including an outdoor screening of black metal documentary Until the Light Takes Us on screen made of snow in the middle of Winnipeg winter and an immersive event based on The Flaming Lips’ quadrophonic album Zaireeka for which Winnipeg filmmakers were commissioned to create original works to play on four screens simultaneously.

In 2008, she founded and coordinated Gimme Some Truth: The Winnipeg Documentary Project for the Winnipeg Film Group. Visiting filmmakers included Les Blank, Steve James, Allan King, Kirby Dick, Zacharias Kunuk and Nettie Wild, among others. It has continued as an annual event mounted by the Winnipeg Film Group.

From 2008-2011, she founded and ran Plastic Paper: Winnipeg’s Festival of Animated, Illustrated and Puppet Film, a five day festival of independent animation arts, including screenings, installations and expanded cinema performances. Special guests included Ralph Bakshi, Bill Plympton, Heather Henson and more.

She co-founded Montreal microcinema Blue Sunshine in Montreal with fellow programmer David Bertrand in 2010. The microcinema ran from 2010-2012 and is documented in Donna DeVille’s 2014 PhD thesis The Microcinema Movement and Montreal (PDF) (PhD). Concordia University. 2014., as well as Incite Journal of Experimental Cinema, Vol. 4: The Exhibition Guide.

From 2011-2013, she oversaw programming for Pop Montreal’s film section, Film Pop, which included screenings, talks, workshops, exhibits and installations, including site-specific screenings of The Omen in a church, and Jerzy Skolimowsky’s Deep End with the audience in a pool.

In 2016, she was the Festival Director of Monster Fest in Melbourne, Australia.

An avowed film locations aficionado, in 2018 Janisse organized the first Horror Express, a chartered bus tour through horror film locations in Toronto and beyond, co-hosted by Chris Alexander, and followed this up in 2019 with a similar tour through Montreal horror film locations, co-hosted by Michael Gingold, in conjunction with the Fantasia International Film Festival.

== The Miskatonic Institute of Horror Studies ==
In 2010, Janisse founded The Miskatonic Institute of Horror Studies, an international organization that offers undergraduate-level history, theory and production-based masterclasses with branches in London, New York and Los Angeles. Miskatonic is a largely volunteer-run endeavor through which established horror writers, directors, scholars and programmers/curators celebrate horror history and culture. Instructors have included Alexandra Heller-Nicholas, Daniel Bird, Dennis Paoli, Stuart Gordon, Douglas E. Winter, Grady Hendrix, Jack Ketchum, Jack Sargeant, Jasper Sharp, John Skipp, Karen Arthur, Kim Newman, Maitland McDonagh, Mark Jancovich, Mitch Horowitz, Ramsey Campbell, Stephen Thrower and many more.

Classes Janisse has personally taught at Miskatonic include: Murder Season: Crime-Solving Plants and Other Vegetal Horrors (2019); Travel Terror: Airline Anxiety in the Golden Age of Hijacking (2017); Tele-Terrors: The Real and Imagined Horrors Inside the Made-for-Television Movie (with Amanda Reyes and Jennifer Wallis, 2017); School of Shock: Pain and Pleasure in the Classroom Safety Film (2012) and more.

== Publications ==
Janisse is the author of A Violent Professional: The Films of Luciano Rossi (FAB Press, 2007) and House of Psychotic Women: An Autobiographical Topography of Female Neurosis in Horror and Exploitation Films (FAB Press, 2012).

She contributed to Destroy All Movies!! The Complete Guide to Punks on Film (Fantagraphics, 2011), Recovering 1940s Horror: Traces of a Lost Decade (Lexington, 2014) The Canadian Horror Film: Terror of the Soul (University of Toronto Press, 2015) and We Are the Martians: The Legacy of Nigel Kneale (PS Press, 2017).

In 2014, she created the publishing imprint Spectacular Optical. Through this imprint she co-edited (with Paul Corupe) and published the anthology books KID POWER! (2014), Satanic Panic: Pop-Cultural Paranoia in the 1980s (2015), and Yuletide Terror: Christmas Horror on Film and Television (2017), as well as publishing Lost Girls: The Phantasmagorical Cinema of Jean Rollin (2017). Janisse has done the art direction and layout for all Spectacular Optical publications.

In 2019, she was the guest editor of Nicolas Winding Refn’s website, ByNWR.com, overseeing Volume 5: Monstrous Extravagances.

She edited the book Warped & Faded: Weird Wednesday and the Birth of the American Genre Film Archive (Mondo, 2021).

As of 2021, she is co-authoring (with Amy Voorhees Searles) the book ‘Unhealthy and Aberrant’: Depictions of Horror Fandom in Film and Television and co-curating (with Clint Enns) an anthology book on the films of Robert Downey Sr., as well as writing a monograph about Monte Hellman’s Cockfighter.

In 2020, she began the podcast A Song From the Heart Beats the Devil Every Time, expanded from a proposed book project about cult kids film and television from 1965-1985. The podcast’s name is derived from the 1978 Nelvana Halloween special The Devil and Daniel Mouse, which is the subject of its first episode.

=== House of Psychotic Women ===
In 2012, Janisse released her film criticism/memoir hybrid House of Psychotic Women: An Autobiographical Topography of Female Neurosis in Horror and Exploitation Films, which explored her troubled life from childhood adoption through teenage years in group homes and reform school and precarious adult relationships, reflected through the lens of horror films that featured similarly unstable female characters.

The book was first released with endorsements from Fritz the Cat director Ralph Bakshi (“God, this woman can write, with a voice and intellect that's so new.”) and The Wasp Factory author Iain Banks (“Fascinating, engaging and lucidly written: an extraordinary blend of deeply researched academic analysis and revealing memoir.”)

In his column in Gorezone #32, Tim Lucas called it “A groundbreaking book,” continuing to say that “This is a rare work within the field, one that takes an almost novelistic leap of imagination in determining and recording its subject and collating its parts. The personal chapters are fascinating and harrowing, showing gifts for autobiographic writing not commonly found among film critics. Janisse proves an equally adept critic; her selection of films reveals a remarkably thorough immersion in her subject. She also deserves points for confronting the question about the subtle scars that we may invite by turning to such films for entertainment.”

Ian MacAllister-McDonald of the LA Review of Books wrote that “What ultimately makes House of Psychotic Women so spellbinding is less the memoir or the reviews as individual entities, but the way that the two, when juxtaposed, remind us that these stories are rooted in the real; and not the big/broad/social-political real, but the real that is small and intimate and experiential.”

Beginning in 2012, the book formed the basis of film retrospectives in Austin, Montreal, Los Angeles, Brussels, Amsterdam, Melbourne and more. The book was responsible for the re-popularization of many neglected films (most notably, Andrzej Zulawski’s Possession, Karen Arthur’s The Mafu Cage, Eckhart Schmidt’s Der Fan and Tony Williams’ Next of Kin), and since its publication, “Psychotic Women” has been referred to as a subgenre unto itself.

In 2017, Janisse and producer Andy Starke of Rook Films pitched a television series based on the book at the Frontieres International Co-Production Market.

== Film work ==
From 2005 to 2010, Janisse made a series of unofficial music documentaries, referred to by video artist Hope Peterson as “bibliodocs,” as they featured exclusively pre-existing footage with contextual intertitles or voiceover narration. These included Bubblegum Music is the Naked Truth! (2005) based on the book by Kim Cooper and David Smay, and My Autumn’s Done Come: The Lee Hazlewood Story (2006). In 2010 her bibliodoc Teen Routines: The Self-Made Magic of R. Stevie Moore screened at The Horse Hospital in London, UK and the Antimatter Festival in Victoria, Canada. The 55-minute program focused on musician R. Stevie Moore's mid-career output (1974-1988), with an opening credit sequence by Canadian independent animator Leslie Supnet.

Janisse was a producer on Mike Malloy's feature documentary Eurocrime: the Italian Cop and Gangster Films That Ruled the ’70s (2012), Sean Hogan's short horror film We Always Find Ourselves in the Sea (2017) and Mike McKinlay's short documentary Tights Worship: The Processes of The Rita (2019).

In 2017, she began working with Severin Films as an editor and producer for their special features. This collaboration led to Janisse's first feature as director/producer, Woodlands Dark and Days Bewitched: A History of Folk Horror, which premiered at SXSW 2021 and won the Midnighters Audience Award. In 2020 Janisse co-produced the documentary feature Tales of the Uncanny with David Gregory of Severin Films, interviewing over 60 filmmakers, critics and scholars about the history of the horror portmanteau film. The documentary premiered at Wales' Abertoir Film Festival in October 2020.

In 2019, Janisse participated in the restoration and re-release of Harry Nilsson’s 1971 animated TV movie The Point, offering the use of her personal 16mm film print and contributing to several of the bonus features for the 2020 MVD Blu-ray release as a producer and editor.

In 2019 and 2020, Janisse appeared as a guest speaker on the AMC series Eli Roth's History of Horror.

In 2020, Janisse embarked on three collaborations as a writer with photographer Nick Knight, creating the fashion films S.W.A.L.K., S.W.A.L.K. II, and Maison Margiela: A Folk Horror Tale for designer John Galliano, with the latter based on design concepts by Galliano for his 2021 'Artisanal' collection.
