= Oksana Bulgakowa =

Russian professor

Oksana Bulgakowa (born 18 February 1954) is a professor of film history and film analysis at the University of Mainz.

== Career ==
Bulgakowa was born in 1954 in Nikopol, Soviet Union. She studied film theory and history for five years at the All-Union State Institute of Cinematography (VGIK) in Moscow and graduated in 1977. She then followed her husband, Dietmar Hochmuth, to East Germany where she completed a screenwriting course at the Academy of Film and Television in Potsdam-Babelsberg.

In 1982 she received her doctorate in Theory of the Performing Arts from the Humboldt University of Berlin. As a researcher, she worked for institutions such as the Institute of Performing Arts, the film research group at the Academy of Arts of the GDR (1984–1990). After the fall of the Berlin Wall, she worked at the Friends of the German Cinematheque and the International Forum of New Cinema (1990–1993), the Förderungsgesellschaft wissenschaftliche Neuvorhaben (1994– 1996), and in the Lotman Institute for Russian and Soviet Culture at Ruhr University Bochum (2002–2005).

Bulgakowa taught at the Humboldt University, the Theaterhochschule Leipzig, and Freie Universität Berlin. As a visiting professor she taught at Stanford University (1998–2004) and University of California Berkeley (2004), before being appointed as a professor at the International Film School Cologne in 2004.

== Work ==
Much of Bulgakowa's work has focused on the life and work of Sergei Eisenstein. She has written and edited books on the director and theoretician. These further explored specific aspects of Russian-Soviet film history.

She was also curator of several exhibitions (including "Moscow – Berlin, Berlin – Moscow, 1990-1950", Martin-Gropius-Bau, Berlin 1995; "Sergei Eisenstein: The Mexican Drawings", Antwerp 2009).

In addition, she worked as a writer and director on the film essays The Different Faces of Sergei Eisenstein (in collaboration with Dietmar Hochmuth), Stalin - A Mosfilm Production (in collaboration with Frieda Grafe and Enno Patalas), and The Factory of Gestures. Body Language in Film (2008).

== Filmography ==
- 1988: In one breath (Screenplay with Dietmar Hochmuth)

== Literature ==
- Oksana Bulgakowa: The unusual adventure of Dr. Mabuse in the land of Bolshevik. The book accompanying the film series "Moscow – Berlin". Preface Ulrich Gregor. Arsenal (Film Institute), Berlin 1995 ISBN 3927876100
