= Klaus Löwitsch =

German actor (1936–2002)

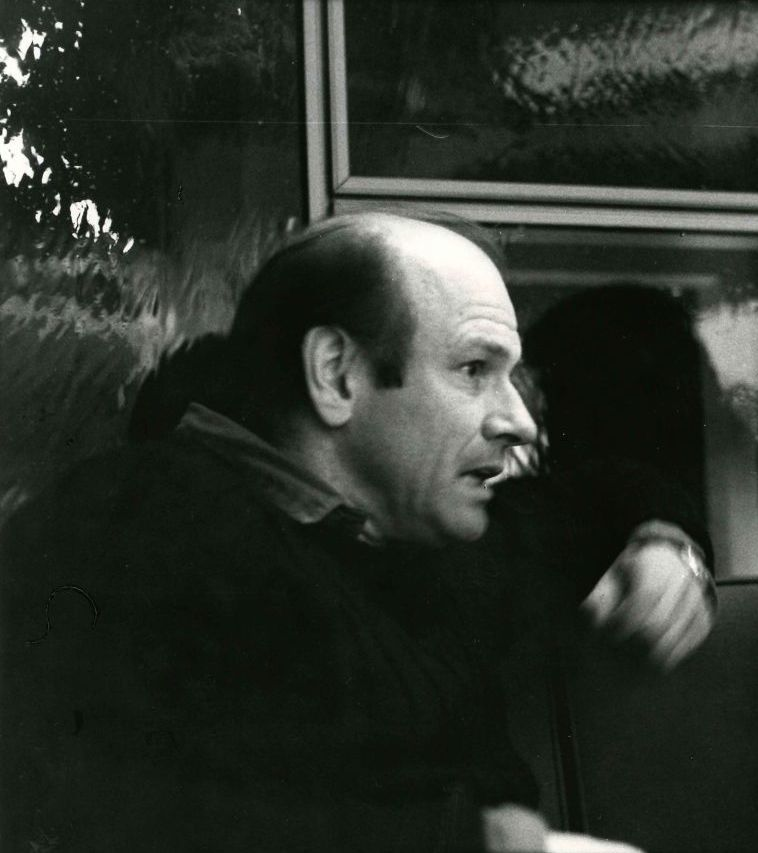
Klaus Löwitsch

Klaus Löwitsch (8 April 1936 – 3 December 2002) was a German actor, best known in Germany for his starring role in the television detective series Peter Strohm.

He appeared in several films directed by Rainer Werner Fassbinder, beginning with Pioneers in Ingolstadt (1971) and notably including World on a Wire (1973) and The Marriage of Maria Braun (1979).

His English language films include Cross of Iron (1977), The Odessa File (1974), Firefox (1982) and Fassbinder's Despair (1978).

He was born in Berlin. He died in Munich from pancreatic cancer.

== Filmography ==
Year	Title	Role	Director	Notes
1956	Where the Lark Sings	Karl	Hans Wolff	
1956	The Hunter of Fall		Gustav Ucicky	
1958	Scherben bringen Glück	Hans Fröhlich, Revuesänger	Ernst Marischka	
1958	Träume von der Südsee	Percy Remberg	Harald Philipp	
1958	Der Page vom Palast-Hotel	Peter	Thomas Engel	
1958	The Crammer	Harry Engelmann	Axel von Ambesser	
1960	… und noch frech dazu!	Bulle	Rolf von Sydow	
1960	A Woman for Life	Willy Heinemann	Wolfgang Liebeneiner	
1961	Schlagerparade 1961	Haifisch	Franz Marischka	
1963	The Black Cobra	Boogie	Rudolf Zehetgruber	
1967	Girls, Girls	Schorsch	Roger Fritz	
1967	Hot Pavements of Cologne	Willy	Ernst Hofbauer	
1968	Till the Happy End	Arnold	Theodor Kotulla	
1970	The Brutes	Werner	Roger Fritz	
1971	Pioneers in Ingolstadt	Sergeant	Rainer Werner Fassbinder	TV film
1971	The Merchant of Four Seasons	Harry	Rainer Werner Fassbinder	
1971	Das Messer	Frank Batman	Rolf von Sydow	TV miniseries
1973	Desaster	Urs Werther	Reinhard Hauff	TV film
1973	World on a Wire	Fred Stiller	Rainer Werner Fassbinder	TV film
1973	The Bloody Vultures of Alaska	Lapporte	Harald Reinl	
1973	Libero	Jo Marvissen	Wigbert Wicker	
1973	Hubertus Castle	Schipper	Harald Reinl	
1974	Der Jäger von Fall	Lenz	Harald Reinl	
1974	The Odessa File	Gustav Mackensen	Ronald Neame	
1974	Zwei himmlische Dickschädel	Kamberger	Werner Jacobs	
1975	Rosebud	Schloss	Otto Preminger	
1976	Shadow of Angels	Jude	Daniel Schmid	
1976	Attempted Flight	Police man in Vienna	Vojtěch Jasný	
1977	The Brothers	Frank Fachmin	Wolf Gremm	
1977	Cross of Iron	Cpl. Krüger	Sam Peckinpah	
1978	Despair	Felix	Rainer Werner Fassbinder	
1979	Tatort: Die Kugel im Leib	Paco	Wolfgang Staudte	TV series episode
1979	The Marriage of Maria Braun	Hermann Braun	Rainer Werner Fassbinder	
1979	Breakthrough	Cpl. Krüger	Andrew V. McLaglen	
1979	Pakleni otok	Petty Officer	Vladimir Tadej	
1980	Desideria: la vita interiore	Tiberi	Gianni Barcelloni Corte	
1981	Exil	Sepp Trautwein	Egon Günther	TV miniseries
1981	Sonderdezernat K1: Die Rache eines V-Mannes	Harry Wolters	Alfred Weidenmann	TV series episode
1982	Night Crossing	Schmolk	Delbert Mann	
1982	Tatort: So ein Tag …	Rolfs	Jürgen Roland	TV series episode
1982	Firefox	General Vladimirov	Clint Eastwood	
1984	A Kind of Anger	Kai Haller	Uli Edel	TV film
1985	Tatort: Acht, neun – aus	Dietze	Jürgen Roland	TV series episode
1985	Gotcha!	Vlad	Jeff Kanew	
1985	Kaminsky	Kaminsky	Michael Lähn	
1987	Treasure Island in Outer Space	Captain Smollet	Antonio Margheriti	TV miniseries
1989–1996	Peter Strohm	Peter Strohm		TV series, 63 episodes
1997	Napoleon Fritz	Friedrich Golz	Thorsten Näter	TV film
1997	Das Urteil	Siegfried Rabinovicz	Oliver Hirschbiegel	TV film; Grimme-Preis
1999	Chain of Evidence	David Bornett	Michael Rowitz	TV film
2001	Hostile Takeover	Willi Konrad	Carl Schenkel	
2001	The Tanker	Harris	Werner Masten	TV film
2001	What to Do in Case of Fire?	Manowski	Gregor Schnitzler	
2002	Extreme Ops	Slobodan Pavlov	Christian Duguay	(final film role)

== External links and references ==
- Klaus Löwitsch at IMDb
- Klaus Löwitsch at Allmovie
