= Dear Mr. Wonderful =

1982 film by Peter Lilienthal

- Directed by: Peter Lilienthal
- Written by: Sam Koperwas
- Produced by: Joachim von Vietinghoff
- Starring: Joe Pesci; Larry Rapp; Evan Handler; Frank Vincent; Tony Martin
- Cinematography: Michael Ballhaus
- Music by: Claus Bantzer
- Release date: 1982 (U.S.)
- Running time: 100 minutes
- Country: West Germany
- Language: English

Dear Mr. Wonderful (Note: Titled onscreen as Dear Mister Wonderful') (also known as Ruby's Dream in some US video releases) is a 1982 German comedy-drama crime film starring Joe Pesci.

== Plot ==
Ruby Dennis is a small-time lounge singer who owns a bowling alley which is in danger of closing as credit is being withdrawn and equipment is being slowly taken away by loan sharks. He attempts to make it big while struggling against the mob and finding romance with Sharon. Dennis lives with his sister, Paula, and her son, Raymond. Paula quits her job and runs off to help the poor, leaving Dennis to keep Raymond away from a life of crime. Ruby ventures toward a spiritual crisis, something that is off-kilter to his surroundings.

== Cast ==
- Joe Pesci as Ruby Dennis
- Karen Ludwig as Paula
- Frank Vincent as Louie
- Ed O'Ross as Glenn
- Richard S. Castellano as FBI Agent
- Ivy Ray Browning as Sharon
- Larry Rapp as Arnold
- Joseph Rigano as Artie
- Gene Ruffini as Jimmy
- Ben Dova as Ben
- Dominick Grieco as Lenny
- Paul Herman as "Hesh"
- Evan Handler as Ray
- Ronald Maccone as Maurice
- Tony Martin as himself (cameo)

== Awards ==
Peter Lilienthal, the film's director, won "Outstanding Individual Achievement: Direction" in the 1983 German Film Awards.
