= Der Forellenhof =

- Written by: Heinz Oskar Wuttig
- Directed by: Wolfgang Schleif
- Starring: Hans Söhnker; Helga Anders
- Country of origin: Germany

Der Forellenhof is a German television series.

== See also ==
- List of German television series
