= Der Preis fürs Überleben =

1980 film

- Directed by: Hans Noever
- Written by: Hans Noever; Patrick Roth; Christian Watton
- Produced by: Denyse Noever
- Starring: Michel Piccoli
- Cinematography: Walter Lassally
- Edited by: Christa Wernicke
- Distributed by: Bayerischer Rundfunk (BR), DNS, Films 66
- Release date: February 1980
- Running time: 103 minutes
- Country: West Germany
- Language: German

Der Preis fürs Überleben is a 1980 West German drama film directed by Hans Noever. It was entered into the 30th Berlin International Film Festival.

== Cast ==
- Michel Piccoli - René Winterhalter
- Martin West - Joseph C. Randolph
- Marilyn Clark - Betty Randolph
- Suzie Galler - Kathleen Randolph
- Daniel Rosen - Thomas Randolph
- Ben Dova - Old Jim
- Leonard Belove - Henderson
- Michael Stumm
- Roger Burget
- Al Christy
- William Kuhlke
- Henry Effertz
- Kurt Weinzierl
- Charles Lewis Jones- Preacher
