= Miskatonic Institute of Horror Studies =

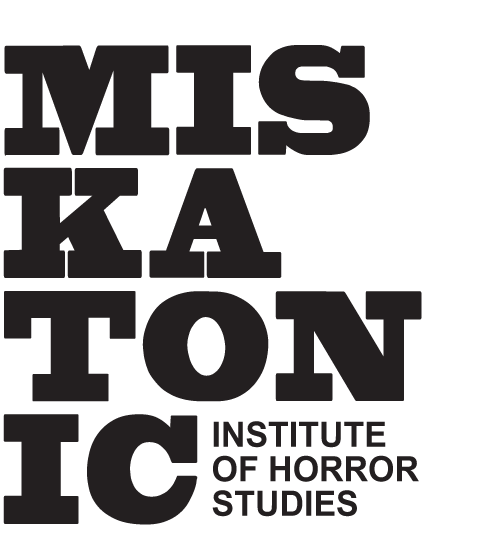
- Industry: film-academia
- Founded: 2010
- Founder: Kier-La Janisse
- Headquarters: London, United Kingdom
- Key people: Josh Saco (Executive Director), Claire Donner (Online Branch Director)
- Website: miskatonicinstitute.com

The Miskatonic Institute of Horror Studies (MIHS) is an educational organization for the academic study of horror in cinema, literature and popular culture. Established in 2010 by Canadian writer and programmer Kier-La Janisse, the institute takes its name from the fictional Miskatonic University in H.P. Lovecraft's Cthulhu Mythos, reflecting a focus on the study of the macabre, uncanny and terrifying.

== History ==
The Miskatonic Institute was originally founded in Winnipeg, Canada, as a community-based education initiative to offer courses on horror culture. Over time, it expanded its reach to include branches in London, New York, and Los Angeles as well as online programming. It holds lectures, panel discussions, and screenings aimed at academics, filmmakers, and horror fans.

== Programming and mission ==
The institute's programming explores horror-related topics, such as the historical and sociocultural contexts of the genre to specific subgenres, directors or literary traditions.

The institute's mission is to provide a platform for the analysis of horror while challenging preconceived notions about the genre's cultural value. It also aims to engage with horror as a vehicle for social commentary.

== Impact and recognition ==
Over the years, the institute has become a significant voice in horror studies, attracting a global audience of enthusiasts and academics. It has been credited with helping to legitimize the study of horror as a serious academic field.

== Notable alumni and contributors ==
The institute has collaborated with a diverse array of individuals, including:

- Kier-La Janisse, founder and author of House of Psychotic Women
- Rebekah McKendry, filmmaker and horror scholar
- Kim Newman, novelist and film critic
- Stephen Thrower, author and expert on European cult cinema

== Publications ==
In addition to live events, the institute produces podcasts, essays, and curated film series.
