= Rabbit in the Pit =

1969 film

- Directed by: Roger Fritz
- Written by: Roger Fritz
- Produced by: Herbert Maris
- Starring: Helga Anders; Anthony Steel; Françoise Prévost
- Cinematography: Rüdiger Meichsner
- Edited by: Hermann Haller; Hella Faust
- Music by: Uli Röver
- Production company: Maris Film
- Distributed by: Inter-Verleih Film
- Release date: 25 April 1969
- Running time: 90 minutes
- Country: West Germany
- Language: German

Rabbit in the Pit (German: Häschen in der Grube) is a 1969 West German drama film directed by Roger Fritz and starring Helga Anders, Anthony Steel and Françoise Prévost. It was filmed in Eastmancolor with location shooting taking place around Spoleto and Palinuro in Italy.

== Synopsis ==
Aspiring ballerina Leslie accompanies her mother Francine and her partner world-renowned conductor Maurice from country to country. She develops a relationship with Maurice, who can be tyrannical and jealous, as well as with Brian a younger man of her own age.

== Cast ==
- Helga Anders as Leslie
- Anthony Steel as Maurice
- Françoise Prévost as Francine
- Ray Lovelock as Brian
- Lawrence Rhodes as Dancer, Harkness Ballet New York
- Lone Isaksen as Dancer, Harkness Ballet New York

== Bibliography ==
- Rentschler, Eric . West German Film in the Course of Time: Reflections on the Twenty Years Since Oberhausen. Redgrave Publishing Company, 1984.
