= The Death of a Double =

1967 film

- Directed by: Rolf Thiele
- Written by: Alfred Braun; Erwin Marno; Rolf Thiele
- Produced by: Dimitri Balachoff; Tony Hermans; Ernst Steinlechner; Hervé Thys; Luggi Waldleitner
- Starring: Jürgen Draeger; Werner Pochath; Ivan Desny
- Cinematography: Wolf Wirth
- Edited by: Ingeborg Taschner
- Music by: Bernd Kampka
- Production companies: Meuter-Titra; Roxy Film; Société de Doublage et de Sonorisation
- Distributed by: Gloria Film
- Release date: 6 January 1967
- Running time: 92 minutes
- Countries: Belgium; West Germany
- Language: German

The Death of a Double (German: Der Tod eines Doppelgängers, French: Les diamants d'Anvers) is a 1967 Belgian-West German crime drama film directed by Rolf Thiele and starring Jürgen Draeger, Werner Pochath and Ivan Desny. It was shot on location in Antwerp and Brussels.

== Synopsis ==
The cynical young Jack plans to rob Cutler, who is smuggling illegal diamonds from Antwerp to Brussels on behalf of his boss Hoggan. Jack wants to live on easy street with lots of money and his model girlfriend Peggy. His plan involved murdering Cutler and assuming his identity by imitating his clothes, walk and voice. However, Cutler has his own plans to rob Hoggan and escape with his girlfriend Margaret. After Jack has killed him, fate takes him to the airport where he encounters both woman at the same time.

== Cast ==
- Jürgen Draeger as Jack
- Werner Pochath as Cutler
- Nicole Badal as Peggy
- Hedy Frick as Margaret
- Ivan Desny as Hoggan
- Alexander Allerson as Joe
- Jaak Van Hombeek as Autohändler

== Bibliography ==
- Bock, Hans-Michael & Bergfelder, Tim. The Concise CineGraph. Encyclopedia of German Cinema. Berghahn Books, 2009.
- Thys, Marianne. Belgian Cinema. Royal Belgian Film Archive, 1999.
