= Gianni Bongioanni =

Italian filmmaker (1921–2018)

Giovanni (Gianni) Bongioanni (August 6, 1921 – January 21, 2018) was an Italian film director, screenwriter, cinematographer, camera operator, editor, writer and occasional actor. He was one of the earliest directors to adopt an authentic, neo-realistic approach to Italian film-making, and his film La svolta pericolosa (1959) is considered the first Italian television series. In addition, Bongioanni was actively involved in the Italian TV and radio broadcasting industries, in which he worked for several years before making his first feature film, Three for a Robbery (1964).

== Life ==
Gianni Bongioanni was born in Turin on August 6, 1921. His mother was a housewife and his father was a turner. At the age of 11, he started working as a turner in his father's store while attending middle school. He found his life at home unsatisfying, and the cinema offered him the best chance of escape from this lifestyle. At the age of 5, he saw his first film (The Kid, directed by Charlie Chaplin) and was so excited by this film that he began to believe that his life could be just like an American film. Bongioanni began attending the two inexpensive cinemas below his house as often as he could; during the following years, he developed a love and an appreciation for American directors and actors. At the age of 11, he took up swimming in order to emulate the Austro-Hungarian American swimmer and actor Johnny Weissmuller, who played Tarzan in 1932. As a teenager, Bongioanni's two main passions were swimming and films.

In 1939, Bongioanni was introduced to Turin's CINEGUF, a Cinema Department founded within Turin University for students who wanted to enter the film industry. This gave him an excellent opportunity to gain experience as a camera operator. In 1941, he joined the Cinema Department of the General Staff of the Italian Royal Army, where he was able to view many of the best foreign films of the 1930s. As a result, he became familiar with the work of the most important and influential directors of the time, including Charlie Chaplin, Frank Capra, Fritz Lang, Ernst Lubitsch, William A. Wellman and Marcel Carné amongst others. Bongioanni was even able to watch the original versions of these films, because they had been taken from captured enemy ships. During this period, he also made several documentaries about the war.

In 1944, Bongioanni became the presenter of the radio station Radiotevere, based in Milan. Shortly afterwards, despite being only 23 years old, he became the director of the radio station. In 1946, after the end of the war, he started his career as a reviewer of films and radio shows at the magazine Film, which was directed by Mino Doletti. During this year, he wrote an article called Abbasso i tromboni! (Down with the Windbags!), in which he attacked the current state of Italian cinema, lambasting certain directors and actors who continued to create films in an antiquated style, despite the increasingly prevalent neo-realism of the period.

In 1952, Bongioanni joined the rising national TV and radio broadcasting company "RAI", becoming the technical manager of its Cinema Production Department under the direction of Sergio Pugliese. In 1957, he decided to begin making his own films. His first film, Filo d'erba (A Blade of Grass) was awarded the Prix Italia, an international radio and television prize. Later, between 1959 and 1967, Bongioanni was the producer and director in several TV productions which demonstrated his ability to understand detailed aspects of Italian society. These included La svolta pericolosa (The dangerous turn), which is considered the first Italian television series, Fine di una solitudine (The end of solitude) and La madre di Torino(A mother in Turin). In 1964, he made his first feature film, Three for a Robbery, an action film based on the life of a young Italian immigrant moving to Germany.

After directing various documentaries, Bongioanni returned to fiction in the 1970s with a series of TV series which are considered some of the best in Italian TV history. As a result, Bongioanni has been praised as a director who has tried to bring the painful, and often forgotten, truth to light.. These films marked him out as a keen observer of the harsh realities of Italian life. They included Dedicato a un bambino (Dedicated to a child), Una pistola nel cassetto (A gun in the drawer), Una donna (A Woman), Un matrimonio di provincia (A wedding in a small town), Mia figlia (My daughter) and several others.

In 2011, at the age of 90, Bongioanni decided to make a new film, Di quell'amor (On that love), collaborating with a small group of younger film-makers. This film is about love in old age.

== Directing techniques ==
Bongioanni created films in the style of documentaries, with a direct sound and spontaneous acting (often using amateurs taken from the street) which requires little or no time to set up. He was also responsible for introducing talented new Italian actors such as Giuliana De Sio, Francesco Salvi, Maria Monti, Angiola Baggi and Carlotta Wittig to the film industry. His filming techniques frequently embedded fragmented editing and the narrator's commentary within the film. The result of this process is a film in which the narrator is able to express his thoughts, however abstract they may be, in the same style as a contemporary essay or novel.

== Directing career ==
=== Radio broadcasts ===
- Radiotevere (1945-1946)
- Radiofiera (1946)
- Dossier Giöngessy (1998)
- Il naso di Mussolini (2000)

=== Documentaries ===
- Giovani d'oggi (1959)
- Il futuro delle Puglie (1962)
- Chiamata urgente (1962)
- I rotoli della Bibbia (1967)
- La coltivazione del deserto (1967)
- L'alimentazione del futuro (1969)

=== TV series ===
- Filo d'erba (1957)
- La svolta pericolosa (1959)
- La madre di Torino (1967)
- Dedicato ad un bambino (1971)
- Una pistola nel cassetto (1973)
- Una donna (1975)
- Un matrimonio di provincia (1979)
- Mia figlia (1982)
- Giovanni da una madre all'altra (1983)
- Follia amore mio (1986)
- Piange al mattino il figlio del cuculo (1989)

=== Feature films ===
- Three for a Robbery (1964)
- Di quell'amor (2014)

== Acting career ==
In 1967, Bongioanni played a very small part in Paolo Cavara's film L'occhio selvaggio (The wild eye). He has also occasionally acted in his own films.

== Writing career ==
In 2003, Bongioanni published a book called RADIOTEVERE. This book is about his experiences as a young radio presenter and director towards the end of the Second World War. In 2008, he published another book, PROFESSIONE REGISTA (PROFESSION: DIRECTOR). This is an account of his professional life, from his early experience of the film industry in Turin to his troubled time in the world of Cinecittà.

== Other information ==
Bongioanni's writing, research, editing and management of production is all carried out at his home in Rome. This allows him to have almost complete artistic control, as well as diminishing his expenses significantly.

== Filmography and awards ==
Year	English title	Original title	Director	Producer	Writer	Premiere	Note	Awarded
1956	A blade of grass	Filo d'erba	Yes	Yes	Yes	Television	The story of a child worker	International Radio and TV film Prize “Prix Italia”.
1959	The dangerous turn	La svolta pericolosa	Yes	Yes	Yes	Television	This consists of 4 episodes, and is considered the first Italian TV series	Mention d’honneur – Festival de Cannes (1960)
1964	Three for a Robbery	Tre per una rapina	Yes	Yes	Yes	Theatrical	A noir action story	
1965	The end of solitude	Fine di una solitudine	Yes	Yes	Yes	Television	The difficult life of a divorced woman	
1967	A mother in Turin	La madre di Torino	Yes	Yes	Yes	Television	A docudrama	International Radio and TV film Prize “Prix Italia”
1971	Dedicated to a child	Dedicato a un bambino	Yes	Yes	Yes	Television	The 3-episode story of a poorly-adjusted child	
1973	A gun in the drawer	Una pistola nel cassetto	Yes	Yes	Yes	Television	A 3-episode series	
1977	A woman	Una donna	Yes	Yes	Yes	Television	From the novel by Sibilla Aleramo: the true story of the first Italian feminist of the 1900s, told in 6 episodes	
1979	A wedding in a small-town	Un matrimonio in provincia	Yes	Yes	Yes	Television	From the novel by Maria Antonietta Torriani: a tactful story of love in the nineteenth century, told in 2 episodes	
1981	My daughter	Mia figlia	Yes	Yes	Yes	Television	From the novel by Maria Marcone: the story of an anorexic girl, told in 3 episodes	International Prize “ENNIO FLAIANO” (1982)
1983	Giovanni from one mother to another	Giovanni da una madre all'altra	Yes	Yes	Yes	Television	The story of a failed adoption, told in 3 episodes	
1986	Madness, my love	Follia amore mio	Yes	Yes	Yes	Television	The story of a mentally ill family, told in 3 episodes	SFIFF 30- 1987 San Francisco International Film Festival
1989	A cuckoo's son cries in the morning	Piange al mattino il figlio del cuculo	Yes	Yes	Yes	Television	The story of a surrogate mother, told in 2 episodes	

== Links ==
- Gianni Gongioanni (German)
- https://www.imdb.com/name/nm0094467/
- http://www.mymovies.it/biografia/?r=7640
- http://dirtypictures.phpbb8.de/sonstiges-aus-italien-f32/drei-von-uns-gianni-bongioanni-t5662.html
- The New York Times Movies
