= Ben Dova =

German-American actor and acrobat (1905–1986)

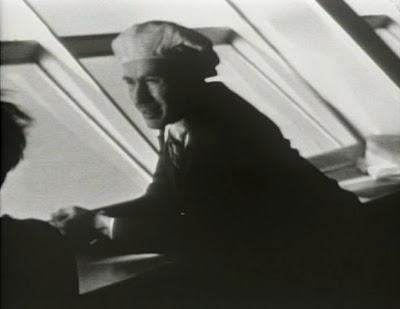
- Ben Dova on the last flight of the Hindenburg
- Born: Joseph Anthony Späh; March 14, 1905; Strasbourg, Alsace–Lorraine, German Empire
- Died: September 30, 1986 (aged 81); Manassas, Virginia, U.S.
- Occupations: Acrobat; actor
- Years active: 1922–1982
- Known for: Drunk man contortionist act Surviving the Hindenburg disaster Playing Klaus Szell in Marathon Man

Joseph Anthony Späh (March 14, 1905 – September 30, 1986), known as Ben Dova, was a German–American acrobat and actor.

== Career ==
Späh emigrated from Germany to the United States in 1922 and became a contortionist in the vaudeville genre, using the artist name Ben Dova, from the English "bend over". His signature act was playing a drunk man balancing on a street light. In 1933 he performed his act on top of the 56-story Chanin Building in New York with no safety measures, for the benefit of the newsreels.

Next to his acrobatic career he became an actor, performing in small parts in movies and television episodes, most notably as Klaus Szell (the brother of the movie's antagonist) in Marathon Man (1976).

== Hindenburg disaster ==
Dova was a passenger on board the LZ 129 Hindenburg during the Hindenburg disaster and escaped using his acrobatic skills. The FBI investigated him as a possible saboteur but found no evidence and cleared him from wrongdoing.

He was played by Robert Clary in the motion picture The Hindenburg (1975).

== Filmography ==
- A Chinatown Fantasy (1930, short)
- The Way of All Freshmen, (1933, a Broadway Brevity short) – Acrobatic dancer
- Toast of the Town (1952, television variety show, one episode)
- Naked City (1962, television series, season 3, episode 20: To Walk Like a Lion) – Tailor
- Marathon Man (1976) – Klaus Szell
- Der Preis fürs Überleben (1980, West German movie) – Jim
- Dear Mr. Wonderful (1982, West German movie) – Ben
- Höllenfahrten: Titanic der Lüfte – Die letzte Fahrt der Hindenburg (2000, German TV episode) – Self
- Die letzten Stunden der Hindenburg (2011, German documentary) – Self
