= The Brutes =

1970 film

- Directed by: Roger Fritz
- Written by: Jürgen Knop; Winfried Schnitzler; Roger Fritz
- Produced by: Roger Fritz
- Starring: Helga Anders; Klaus Löwitsch; Arthur Brauss
- Cinematography: Wolfgang Kohl; Egon Mann
- Edited by: Jutta Brandstaedter; Peter Przygodda; Christa Wernicke
- Music by: Irmin Schmidt
- Production companies: Roger Fritz Filmproduktion; Smart Filmproduktionsgesellschaft
- Distributed by: Cinerama Filmgesellschaft
- Release date: 19 February 1970
- Running time: 98 minutes
- Country: West Germany
- Language: German

The Brutes (German: Mädchen mit Gewalt) is a 1970 West German drama film directed by Roger Fritz and starring Helga Anders, Klaus Löwitsch and Arthur Brauss. It was shot on location around Munich.

== Synopsis ==
Friends Werner and Mike meet up with Alice and take her for a night-time swim at a gravel pit, but their friendship soon turns to violent rivalry.

== Cast ==
- Helga Anders as Alice
- Klaus Löwitsch as Werner
- Arthur Brauss as Mike
- Rolf Zacher as Rolf
- Monika Zinnenberg
- Astrid Boner
- Elga Sorbas
- Henry van Lyck

== Reception ==
In his review for music review website critic.de, Michael Kienz concluded that "the film was capable of painting a scathing portrait of the morals of the Federal Republic of Germany at the time may be due to Fritz's enthusiasm for popular cinema. But just because a director can stage fights and doesn't deny his protagonist's sexual appeal doesn't mean he's any less realistic. The film already has one foot in a new era, where Werner and Mike have to accept that their rough manner will soon no longer be effective. With the other foot, however, it remains in a dark past, where a raped woman in a miniskirt would think twice about subjecting herself to further humiliation at the hands of the police."

== Bibliography ==
- Gerhardt, Christina & Abel, Marco. Celluloid Revolt: German Screen Cultures and the Long 1968. Camden House, 2019.
