= No Shooting Time for Foxes =

1966 film

- Directed by: Peter Schamoni
- Written by: Peter Schamoni; Günter Seuren
- Produced by: Peter Carsten
- Starring: Helmut Förnbacher
- Cinematography: Jost Vacano
- Edited by: Heidi Genée
- Production company: Peter Schamoni Film
- Distributed by: Atlas Film
- Release date: 8 July 1966
- Running time: 92 minutes
- Country: West Germany
- Language: German

No Shooting Time for Foxes (German: Schonzeit für Füchse) is a 1966 West German drama film directed by Peter Schamoni. It was entered into the 16th Berlin International Film Festival where it won the Silver Bear Extraordinary Jury Prize.

== Cast ==
- Helmut Förnbacher as A Young Man
- Christian Doermer as Viktor
- Andrea Jonasson as Clara
- Monika Peitsch as Lore
- Edda Seippel as Clara's Mother
- Helmuth Hinzelmann as Viktor's Father
- Suse Graf as Viktor's Mother
- Alexander Golling as An Uncle
- Willy Birgel as Hunting Author
- Dom de Beern
- Erna Haffner as Redakteurin
- Siegfried Siegert
- Nina Stepun as Balletteuse
