= Helga Sommerfeld =

German actress (1941–1991)

- Born: 5 March 1941; Dresden, Germany
- Died: 28 September 1991 (aged 50); Berlin, Germany
- Occupation: Actress
- Years active: 1958-1985 (Film and TV)

Helga Sommerfeld (1941–1991) was a German film, stage and television actress, active in cinema primarily in the 1950s and 1960s. She played the female lead in several films during the 1960s.

== Selected filmography ==
- My Sweetheart Is from Tyrol (1958)
- Peter Voss, Hero of the Day (1959)
- Our House in Cameroon (1961)
- The Shadows Grow Longer (1961)
- The Secret of the Black Trunk (1962)
- Apartmentzauber (1963)
- The Nylon Noose (1963)
- The Phantom of Soho (1964)
- 24 Hours to Kill (1965)
- Red Dragon (1965)
- Code Name: Jaguar (1965)
- Seven Hours of Gunfire (1965)
- Man on the Spying Trapeze (1966)
- Long Legs, Long Fingers (1966)
- Till the Happy End (1968)

== Bibliography ==
- Cowie, Peter. World Filmography. Tantivy Press, 1968.
- Lentz, Harris M. Feature Films, 1960–1969: A Filmography of English-Language and Major Foreign-Language United States Releases. McFarland, 2009.
