= Muzhiki! =

1981 film

- Directed by: Iskra Babich
- Written by: Iskra Babich; Vadim Mikhajlov
- Starring: Aleksandr Mikhajlov; Pyotr Glebov
- Cinematography: Sergei Zajtsev
- Edited by: Lyubov Butuzova
- Music by: Vladimir Komarov
- Production company: Mosfilm
- Release date: 1981
- Running time: 97 minutes
- Country: Soviet Union
- Language: Russian

Muzhiki! (Russian: Мужики!) is a 1981 Soviet drama film directed by Iskra Babich. It was entered into the 32nd Berlin International Film Festival, where it won an Honourable Mention.

== Plot ==
Pavel Zubov (Aleksandr Mikhajlov) lives and works in the polar city of Nikel. He came there thirteen years ago, just after completing his military service, without even a glance at the road leading to his native village, where his fiancée Nastya was waiting for him. The thing is that Pavel received a letter from his mother, from which he learned that Nastya had cheated on him and was expecting a child from an unknown father. That is why he did not return home and stayed to work in the North.

A letter informing Pavel that his father is seriously ill forces him to visit the parents. It turns out that everything is fine with his father (he just used the letter as a trick to force his son to visit). But Nastya died recently. Pavel learns that his mother was wrong when she sent the unfortunate letter about her. Nastya loved Pavel and it was from him that she gave birth to a girl named Polina. Later, after marrying a drunkard artist, Anastasia gave birth to a son named Pavlik and also adopted Styopka, a child from a maternity hospital. Everyone thinks that Styopka is mute from birth, even though he hears perfectly, understands everything and has no physical defects which prevent him from talking. The father of Pavlik became a chronic alcoholic, and has long since left the family. The children do not have adult able-bodied family members and foster care is not given to Pavel's parents because they are elderly.

It is not easy for Pavel to decide if he can assume responsibility for the fate of not only of his biological daughter but also of the two boys.

== Cast ==
- Aleksandr Mikhajlov as Pavel
- Pyotr Glebov as Pavel's father
- Vera Alkhovskaya Polina mother of Pavel
- Irina Ivanova as Polina
- Mikhail Buzylyov-Kretso as Stepan
- Pyotr Krylov as Pavlik
- Aleksandr Pavlov as Sergei
- Anatoly Solonitsyn as artist
- Mariya Andrianova as aunt Ustyusha
- Svetlana Tormakhova as Inspector of Social Services
- Leonard Varfolomeyev as chairman of the kolkhoz
- Afanasi Kochetkov as uncle Grisha
- Dmitry Buzylyov-Kretso as Arslan Asanov
