= Kraftprobe =

1982 film

- Directed by: Heidi Genée
- Written by: Dagmar Kekulé
- Starring: Kirstin Genee
- Cinematography: Jürgen Jürges
- Edited by: Helga Beyer
- Release date: 1982
- Running time: 84 minutes
- Country: West Germany
- Language: German

Kraftprobe is a 1982 West German drama film directed by Heidi Genée. It was entered into the 32nd Berlin International Film Festival.

== Cast ==
- Kirstin Genee as Paulina
- Hannelore Hoger as Lisa, Paulina's mother
- Kai Taschner as Blues
- Erika Wackernagel as Mrs. Windinger
