= Helga Anders =

Austrian actress

Helga Anders (11 January 1948 – 30 March 1986) was an Austrian actress.

She was born Helga Scherz in Innsbruck, to an Austrian father and a German mother, and she grew up in Ruhpolding and Bielefeld after her parents divorced. She made her stage debut at the age of eight.

Anders is best known in Great Britain for her part in the Yugoslav-West German television series The White Horses, and is also remembered for playing several roles in the German TV series Derrick.

== Personal life ==
She had a daughter, Tatjana Leslie, with the actor Roger Fritz.

She appeared as one of 28 women under the banner We've had abortions! (Wir haben abgetrieben!) on the cover page of the West German magazine Stern on 6 June 1971. In that issue, 374 women publicly stated that they had had pregnancies terminated, which at that time was illegal.

== Death ==
Her addictions with alcohol and drugs resulted in her death at 38. She died of heart failure in Haar, Bavaria, West Germany.

== Selected filmography ==
- Max the Pickpocket (1962), as Brigitte Schilling
- Die Unverbesserlichen (1965–1967, TV series, 3 episodes), as Lore Scholz
- Der Forellenhof (1965, TV series, 8 episodes), as Christa Buchner
- How to Seduce a Playboy (1966), as Lucy
- Congress of Love (1966), as Anni Leithner
- The White Horses (1966, TV series, 13 episodes), as Julia
- Girls, Girls (1967), as Angela
- Murderers Club of Brooklyn (1967), as Edna Cormick
- Das Rasthaus der grausamen Puppen (1967), as Linda
- Tattoo (1967), as Gaby
- Sugar Bread and Whip (1968), as Helga Arnold
- Beyond Control (1968), as Monika
- Rabbit in the Pit (1969), as Leslie
- The Unnaturals (1969), as Elizabeth
- Our Doctor is the Best (1969), as Loni Vogt
- Der Kommissar: "Die Schrecklichen" (1969, TV series episode), as Herta Panse
- The Brutes (1970), as Alice
- Der Kommissar: "Tod eines Schulmädchens" (1972, TV series episode), as Kirsten Benda
- Fall nicht in den Schwanensee (1973, TV film)
- Pan (1973)
- Derrick - Season 1, Episode 2: "Johanna" (1974, TV series episode), as Roswitha Meinecke
- The Clown (1976), as Sabine
- Tatort: "Kassensturz" (1976, TV series episode), as Renate Cand
- Anita Drögemöller und die Ruhe an der Ruhr (1976), as Kimmi
- Das Blaue Palais, Episode 5: "Unsterblichkeit" (1976, TV series episode), as Yvonne
- Derrick - Season 4, Episode 2: "Hals in der Schlinge" (1977, TV series episode), as Heli
- Derrick - Season 5, Episode 2: "Tod eines Fans" (1978, TV series episode), as Vera Höfer
- Derrick - Season 5, Episode 7: "Kaffee mit Beate" (1978, TV series episode), as Beate Schill
- The Old Fox: "Teufelsbrut" (1979, TV series episode), as Christa Brückner
- Hurricane Rosy (1979), as Charlotte
- Derrick - Season 7, Episode 8: "Auf einem Gutshof" (1980, TV series episode), as Waltraud Heimann
- The Old Fox: "Bruderliebe" (1980, TV series episode), as Anita Will
- Derrick - Season 8, Episode 2: "Der Kanal" (1982, TV series episode), as Hannelore Junker
- Derrick - Season 11, Episode 13: "Der Klassenbeste" (1984, TV series episode), as Uschi
- Ein Fall für zwei: "Blutsbande" (1985, TV series episode), as Monika Brauer
