= Girls, Girls =

1967 film

- Directed by: Roger Fritz
- Written by: Eckhart Schmidt; Roger Fritz
- Produced by: Roger Fritz
- Starring: Helga Anders; Jürgen Jung; Hellmut Lange
- Cinematography: Klaus König
- Edited by: Heidi Genée
- Music by: David Llewellyn
- Production company: Roger Fritz Filmproduktion
- Distributed by: Eckelkamp Verleih
- Release date: 5 January 1967
- Running time: 102 minutes
- Country: West Germany
- Language: German

Girls, Girls (German: Mädchen, Mädchen) is a 1967 West German drama film directed by Roger Fritz and starring Helga Anders, Jürgen Jung and Hellmut Lange. The film's sets were designed by the art director Evgeniy Chernyaev. It was part of the New German Cinema movement and was critical of the postwar economic miracle.

== Synopsis ==
Andrea leaves reformatory and stops at the cement factory whose owner had once seduced her while she was underage and is now serving a prison sentence, and meets his son who is now running the business. The two becomes lovers, but the impending release of his father from prison threatens to end their relationship.

== Cast ==
- Helga Anders as Andrea
- Jürgen Jung as Junior
- Hellmut Lange as Ernst
- Renate Grosser as Housekeeper
- Klaus Löwitsch as Schorsch
- Ernst Ronnecker as Vorarbeiter
- Monika Zinnenberg as Monika
- Christian Doermer as Mann im Zug

== Bibliography ==
- Gerhardt, Christina & Abel, Marco. Celluloid Revolt: German Screen Cultures and the Long 1968. Camden House, 2019.
- Rother, Rainer (ed.) German Film: From the Archives of the Deutsche Kinemathek. Hatje Cantz Verlag, 2024.
