= Longing for My Native Country =

1981 film

- Directed by: Hu Bingliu; Wang Jin
- Written by: Wang Yimin
- Starring: Huang Jinchang; Ren Yexiang
- Cinematography: Liang Xiongwei
- Release date: 1981
- Running time: 100 minutes
- Country: China
- Language: Mandarin

Longing for My Native Country (Chinese: 乡情; pinyin: Xiāng Qíng) is a 1981 Chinese drama film directed by Hu Bingliu and Wang Jin. It was entered into the 32nd Berlin International Film Festival.

== Cast ==
- Huang Jinchang - Liao Yiping
- Huang Xiaolei - Tian Gui
- Ren Yexiang - Tian Cuicui
- Wang Jin - Kuanghua
- Wang Qinbao - Lili
- Wu Wenhua - Tian Qiuyue
