= Man on the Spying Trapeze =

1966 film

- Directed by: Juan de Orduña
- Written by: Fortunato Bernal; Juan de Orduña; Nino Stresa; Ernst Ritter von Theumer
- Produced by: Ernst Ritter von Theumer
- Starring: Wayde Preston; Helga Sommerfeld; Reinhard Kolldehoff
- Cinematography: Aldo Ricci
- Edited by: Eugenio Alabiso; Siegfrid Krämer
- Music by: Piero Umiliani
- Production companies: Produzioni Europee Associate; Theumer Filmproduktion
- Distributed by: Accord-Film
- Release date: 12 May 1966
- Running time: 92 minutes
- Countries: Italy; Spain; West Germany
- Language: German

Man on the Spying Trapeze (German: Warteliste zur Hölle, Italian: Jerry Land - Cacciatore di spie, Spanish: Anónima de asesinos) is a 1966 spy film directed by Juan de Orduña and starring Wayde Preston, Helga Sommerfeld and Reinhard Kolldehoff. It was a co-production between Italy, Spain and West Germany, part of the wave of Eurospy thrillers produced in the wake of the success of the James Bond series.

The film's sets were designed by the art directors Francisco Canet and Saverio D'Eugenio. The English-language title is a reference to the song The Daring Young Man on the Flying Trapeze.

== Cast ==
- Wayde Preston as Jerry Land
- Helga Sommerfeld as Solange Dubonet
- Reinhard Kolldehoff as Nick Collins
- Antonio Durán as John Parker
- Noé Murayama as Mr. Wong
- Franco Fantasia as Boris
- Pamela Tudor as Yasmine
- Kai Fischer as Fawzia, Hotel Maid
- Sergio Mendizábal as José
- Robert Johnson Jr. as Major Larighy
- Gianni Rizzo as Stephanolopoulus
- Lisa Halvorsen as Lyda
- Antonio Pica as Stevens
- Joaquín Bergía as Hotel Manager

== Bibliography ==
- Prickette, James Actors of the Spaghetti Western. : Xlibris US, 2012.
