= Jet Generation (film) =

1968 film

- Italian poster
- Directed by: Eckhart Schmidt
- Written by: Eckhart Schmidt; Roger Fritz
- Produced by: Roger Fritz
- Starring: Dginn Moeller; Roger Fritz; Jürgen Draeger
- Cinematography: Charly Bahr
- Edited by: Heidi Genée
- Music by: David Llewellyn
- Production company: Roger Fritz Filmproduktion
- Distributed by: Alpha-Filmverleih
- Release date: 25 January 1968
- Running time: 98 minutes
- Country: West Germany
- Language: German

Jet Generation (German: Jet Generation – Wie Mädchen heute Männer lieben) is a 1968 West German drama film directed by Eckhart Schmidt and starring Dginn Moeller, Roger Fritz and Jürgen Draeger. Location shooting took place around Munich. Although it has elements of New German Cinema, it is more focused on the style and fashion of Swinging Munich in the late 1960s.

== Synopsis ==
Millionaire's daughter Carroll Buchheim returns from the United States to Munich to search for her brother who has been missing for some time. She encounters Raoul, a cynical young photographer and falls in love with him. Soon she is entirely under his spell, even as it becomes clear he was likely the man responsible for her brother's death.

== Cast ==
- Dginn Moeller as Carroll Buchheim
- Roger Fritz as Raoul Malsen
- Jürgen Draeger as Chris
- Isi ter Jung as Hella
- Yella Bleyler as Dorit
- Uta Levka as Teddy
- Hella Moeckl as Patty
- Werner Schwier as Hotel portier
- David Haug as Hyman
- Lukas Ammann as Inspektor Arnold
- Rainer Basedow as Mentler
- Margot Trooger

== Bibliography ==
- Gerhardt, Christina & Abel, Marco. Celluloid Revolt: German Screen Cultures and the Long 1968. Camden House, 2019.
- Rother, Rainer (ed.) German Film: From the Archives of the Deutsche Kinemathek. Hatje Cantz Verlag, 2024.
