= Christian Doermer =

German actor (1935–2022)

- Born: 5 July 1935; Rostock, Mecklenburg, Germany
- Died: 14 July 2022 (aged 87); Nußdorf am Inn, Bavaria, Germany
- Occupation: Actor
- Years active: 1954–2022

Christian Doermer (5 July 1935 – 14 July 2022) was a German actor and director. He appeared in more than 80 films and television shows from 1954 to 2022. He starred in the 1966 film No Shooting Time for Foxes. The film was entered into the 16th Berlin International Film Festival, where it won the Silver Bear Extraordinary Jury Prize. In 1969, Doermer appeared as a German soldier attending the Christmas truce in Sir Richard Attenborough's satirical World War I musical film Oh! What a Lovely War.

Doermer himself has also directed a fair number of films including documentaries and television films. In 1962, he was one of the 26 authors of the famous Oberhausen Manifesto, demanding a change in German film.

== Selected filmography ==
- The Forest House in Tyrol (1955) as Alfons Attinger
- Viele kamen vorbei (1956), as Jochen
- Teenage Wolfpack (1956), as Jan Borchert
- All Roads Lead Home (1957), as Michael
- Der Stern von Afrika (1957), as Unteroffizier Klein
- Precocious Youth (1957), as Wolfgang
- Adorable Arabella (1959), as Helmut Hagemann
- Escape to Berlin (1961), as Claus Baade
- Das Riesenrad (1961), as Hubert von Hill jr.
- Das Halstuch (1962, TV miniseries), as Gerald Quincey
- Child of the Revolution (1962, TV miniseries), as Wolfgang Leonhard
- Terror After Midnight (1962), as Nolan Stoddard
- The Bread of Those Early Years (1962), as Walter Fendrich
- Love at Twenty (1962), as Tonio
- Three for a Robbery (1964), as Mario
- No Shooting Time for Foxes (1966), as Viktor
- Die Rechnung – eiskalt serviert (1966), as Tommy Wheeler
- Girls, Girls (1967), as Mann im Zug
- The Syndicate (1968), as Kurt Hohmann
- Joanna (1968), as Hendrik Casson
- Oh! What a Lovely War (1969), as Fritz
- Downhill Racer (1969), as the German skier at the Winter Olympics
- Lettow-Vorbeck: Der deutsch-ostafrikanische Imperativ (1984, directed by Christian Doermer)
- Väter und Söhne – Eine deutsche Tragödie (1986, TV miniseries), as Dr. Körner
- The Hothouse (1987), as Felix Keetenheuve
- Ende der Unschuld (1991, TV film), as Abraham Esau
- Stauffenberg (2004, TV film), as Field marshal Wilhelm Keitel

== See also ==
- New German Cinema
