= Ren Yexiang =

Chinese actress

- Born: 1961; Changsha, Hunan
- Occupation: Actress

Ren Yexiang (Chinese: 任冶湘; pinyin: Rén Yěxiāng; born 1961) is a Chinese actress of the 1980s.

== Biography ==
Ren Yexiang was born in Changsha, Hunan in 1961. She was admitted to Central Academy of Drama in 1976. She played a role in Yangfan (扬帆, 1981), Longing for My Native Country (1981), Forever Young (青春万岁, 1983), Yilushunfeng (一路顺风, 1983).
