= Iskra Babich =

Soviet film director (1932–2001)

- Born: 10 January 1932; Sochi, Russian SFSR, Soviet Union
- Died: 5 August 2001 (aged 69); Moscow, Russia
- Resting place: Khovanskoye Cemetery
- Occupations: Film director; screenwriter
- Years active: 1960–1983
- Spouse: Afanasi Kochetkov
- Children: Olga Kochetkova

Iskra Leonidovna Babich (Russian: И́скра Леони́довна Ба́бич; 10 January 1932 – 5 August 2001) was a Soviet film director and screenwriter. Her 1981 film Muzhiki! was entered into the 32nd Berlin International Film Festival, where it won an Honourable Mention.

== Filmography ==
- Pastukh (1957)
- First Date (1960)
- High Water (1962)
- Muzhiki! (1981)
- Forgive Me, Alyosha (1983)

== Awards ==
- Muzhiki!
  - Vasilyev Brothers State Prize of the RSFSR (1981)
  - Prize at Film Festivals in West Berlin and Vancouver
  - The Best Film in 1982 in a poll of the magazine Soviet Screen

== Personal life ==
She was married to actor Afanasi Kochetkov (1930–2004). She died of cancer.
