= Three for a Robbery =

1964 film

- Directed by: Gianni Bongioanni
- Written by: Gianni Bongioanni; Leandro Castellani; José María Otero; Gerhard Schmidt; Rochus Spiecker
- Produced by: Franz Thierry
- Starring: Christian Doermer; Werner Peters; Barbara Steele
- Cinematography: Antonio Pérez Olea
- Edited by: Alfred Srp
- Music by: Piero Piccioni
- Production companies: Domiziana Internazionale Cinematografica; Germania-Film; Procusa
- Distributed by: Aglaia Cinematografica
- Release date: 1 August 1964
- Running time: 87 minutes
- Countries: Italy; Spain; West Germany
- Languages: German; Italian

Three for a Robbery (German: Zwischenlandung Düsseldorf, Italian: Tre per una rapina) is a 1964 crime drama film directed by Gianni Bongioanni and starring Christian Doermer, Werner Peters and Barbara Steele. It was a co-production between Italy, Spain and West Germany. The film's sets were designed by the art director Karl Adams.

== Synopsis ==
In Düsseldorf Gerhard works as a technician in a factory producing security alarms for banks. Using his inside knowledge he plans to carry off a heist with the assistance of three other figures of varying backgrounds.

== Cast ==
- Christian Doermer as Mario Bergmann/Becker
- Werner Peters as Peter Weimer
- Barbara Steele as Barbara Sims/ Anna
- Margot Trooger as Margot Weimer
- Dino Mele as Nicola
- Ingeborg Ticheldeckers as Helga
- Hans Echterling as Gerhard

== Bibliography ==
- Curti, Roberto. Italian Giallo in Film and Television: A Critical History. McFarland, 2022.
