= Till the Happy End =

1968 film

- Directed by: Theodor Kotulla
- Written by: Martin Ripkens; Hans Stempel
- Produced by: Hartmut Bahr
- Starring: Klaus Löwitsch; Helga Sommerfeld; Roger Fritz
- Cinematography: Hans-Peter Sickert
- Edited by: Elke Riemann
- Production company: Iduna Film Produktiongesellschaft
- Release date: 10 October 1968
- Running time: 94 minutes
- Country: West Germany
- Language: German

Till the Happy End (German: Bis zum Happy-End) is a 1968 West German drama film directed by Theodor Kotulla and starring Klaus Löwitsch, Helga Sommerfeld and Roger Fritz. Shot in Agfacolor, it was filmed on location in Bonn and Munich. It was part of the New German Cinema movement.

== Cast ==
- Beatrix Ost as Frieda
- Klaus Löwitsch as Arnold
- Christof Hege as Peter
- Helga Sommerfeld as Vera
- Roger Fritz as Paul
- Liane Hielscher as Constanze
- Walter Ladengast as Großvater
- Enno Patalas as Pfarrer
- Christof Wackernagel as Assistent im Fotogeschäft
- Erika Wackernagel as Brigitte
- Christian Ziewer as Tramper

== Bibliography ==
- Bock, Hans-Michael; Bergfelder, Tim (2009). The Concise CineGraph. Encyclopedia of German Cinema. Berghahn Books.
- Rentschler, Eric (1984). West German Film in the Course of Time: Reflections on the Twenty Years Since Oberhausen. Redgrave Publishing Company.
