= Larry Rapp =

American actor

- Born: February 20, 1948 (age 78)
- Occupation: Actor
- Years active: 1982–1990

Larry Rapp (born February 20, 1948) is an American actor. He is perhaps best known for playing Fat Moe in the 1984 film Once Upon a Time in America.

== Filmography ==
Film
Year	Film	Role
1982	Dear Mr. Wonderful	Arnold
1984	Once Upon a Time in America	Morris "Fat Moe" Gelly
1985	Turk 182	Football Fan (uncredited)
1985	Half Nelson	Assistant Director (uncredited)
1990	Betsy's Wedding	Man Outside Restaurant (uncredited)
