= Jürgen Draeger =

German actor

- Born: 2 August 1940; Landsberg an der Warthe, Germany
- Died: 4 December 2020 (aged 80); Berlin, Germany
- Occupations: Actor, singer
- Years active: 1963–1995 (film & TV)

Jürgen Draeger (1940–2020) was a German singer and film and television actor. He appeared in a number of supporting roles in West German television over several decades.

== Selected filmography ==
- Polizeirevier Davidswache (1964)
- 4 Schlüssel (1965)
- When Night Falls on the Reeperbahn (1967)
- The Death of a Double (1967)
- L'Astragale (1968)
- Jet Generation (1968)
- Sugar Bread and Whip (1968)
- Hannibal Brooks (1969)
- Come to Vienna, I'll Show You Something! (1970)
- Liebling, sei nicht albern! (1970)
- Strange City (1972)
- The Third Generation (1979)
- Berlin Alexanderplatz (1980, TV series)
- Lili Marleen (1981)
- Die Story (1984)
- Alpha City (1985)

== Bibliography ==
- Tichler, Andreas. Die Chronik der Zdf-Hitparade: Die Ära Dieter Thomas Heck von 1969–1984. Stadl Media, 2020.
