= Peter Strohm =

- Starring: Klaus Löwitsch
- Country of origin: Germany
- No. of seasons: 5
- No. of episodes: 63

Production
- Running time: 50 min.

Original release
- Release: 1989 – 1996

Peter Strohm was a German crime television series, produced between 1989 and 1996.

== Plot ==
At the beginning of the series, Peter Strohm is the head of the Special Organized Crime Commission in Hamburg. After quitting his job, he continues to work as a private investigator. His investigative methods often border on the illegal, which repeatedly gets him into trouble. He's also a macho man who loves fast cars and women. The series is set in Hamburg, Peter Strohm's hometown, but also in Switzerland, the Netherlands, Austria, Croatia, Italy, the GDR, and the Caribbean.

== See also ==
- List of German television series
