= Strange City (film) =

1972 film

- Directed by: Rudolf Thome
- Written by: Max Zihlmann
- Produced by: Rudolf Thome
- Starring: Roger Fritz; Karin Thome; Peter Moland
- Cinematography: Martin Schäfer
- Edited by: Heidi Genée; Ursula Götz
- Production company: Rudolf Thome Filmproduktion
- Distributed by: Karina Filmverleih
- Release date: 9 June 1972
- Running time: 106 minutes
- Country: West Germany
- Language: German

Strange City (German: Fremde Stadt) is a 1972 West German thriller film directed by Rudolf Thome and starring Roger Fritz, Karin Thome and Peter Moland. It was shot on location around Munich. Unusually for the time, when colour film was the norm, the film was shot in monochrome. It was not a success at the box office.

== Synopsis ==
Philipp Kramer commits a bank robbery in Düsseldorf and then heads to Munich where he plans to launder the proceeds with the help his ex-wife. However a gang of crooks are soon on his tail, as is a very persistent detective.

== Cast ==
- Roger Fritz as Philipp Kramer/Franz Lerchenfeld
- Karin Thome as Sybille Lerchenfeld
- Peter Moland as Fischer
- Christian Friedel as Schrott
- Werner Umberg as Ossi Renz
- Eva Kinsky as Millie
- Raffael Jovine as Kind
- Georg Marischka as Trimborn
- Stefan Abendroth as Zimmerkellner
- Eva Pampuch as Zimmermädchen
- Dorle Fischer as Sprechstundenhilfe
- Rudolf Nahodil as Kneipenwirt
- Martin Sperr as Schmalohr
- Sonja Lindorf as Franziska
- Hans Noever as Franziskas Freund
- Gretl Zeppel as Hemdenverkäuferin
- Willy Schöllhorn as Taxifahrer
- Thomas Stürzer as Hotelmanager
- Helmut Deisböck as Rezeptionist
- Eric Nussbaum as Verkäufer bei Cartier
- Bernd Büttner as Herr Hubertus
- Jürgen Draeger as Man in Pub

== Bibliography ==
- Bock, Hans-Michael & Bergfelder, Tim. The Concise CineGraph. Encyclopedia of German Cinema. Berghahn Books, 2009.
- Cowie, Peter. International Film Guide: 1973. Tantivy Press, 1973.
