= Désirée Nosbusch =

Luxembourgish actress

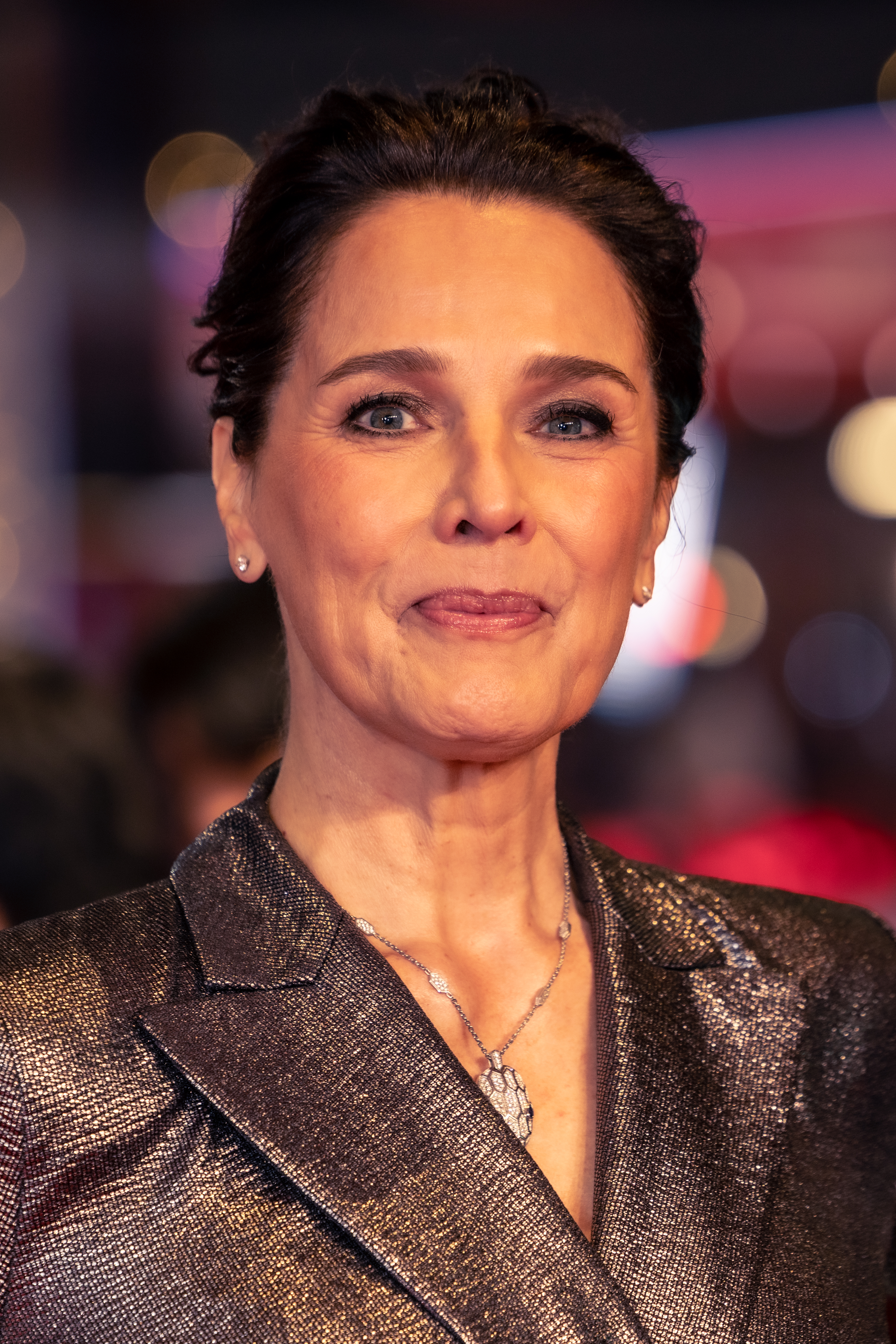
- Nosbusch in 2025
- Born: 14 January 1965 (age 61); Esch-sur-Alzette, Luxembourg
- Other name: Désirée Becker
- Occupations: Actress, singer and television presenter
- Spouses: Harald Kloser (m. 1991; div. 2002) Mehmet Kurtuluş (m. 2005; div. 2013) Tom Bierbaumer (m. 2018)
- Children: 2

Désirée Nosbusch (born 14 January 1965) also known as Désirée Becker, is a Luxembourgish actress and television presenter. She was the host of the Eurovision Song Contest 1984.

== Early and personal life ==
Nosbusch was born in Esch-sur-Alzette, Luxembourg to a Luxembourgish father, Albert Nosbusch, and an Italian mother, Rosa Piccoli. She speaks Luxembourgish, German, French, English, Italian and Spanish.

From 1991 to 2002, Nosbusch was married to Harald Kloser, with whom she had two children. She was later married to Mehmet Kurtuluş. She has been married to Tom Alexander Bierbaumer since 2018.

== Career ==
Nosbusch has acted in both French-language and German-language films and television productions since her mid-teens. She was a member of the youth drama group at Lycée Hubert Clément in Esch-sur-Alzette.

At twelve years old, she started working at Radio Luxembourg, and then did a show with Anke Engelke on ARD. At 16, she held the leading role of the German film After Midnight.

She appeared in some Italian-language TV miniseries. She presented the Eurovision Song Contest 1984 in Luxembourg, and hosted a kids' version of the game show Ruck Zuck called "Kinder Ruck Zuck".

Nosbusch is also a singer. In 1984, she recorded a duet with Austrian singer Falco, "Kann es Liebe sein?".

In 2001, she directed her first short film, Ice Cream Sundae. In 2014, she directed the film Succès Fox about the actor Fernand Fox.

In 2021, she launched the production of the feature film Poison, an adaptation of Lot Vekemans' play, starring Tim Roth and Trine Dyrholm.

In 2024, Nosbusch was one of the hosts of the Luxembourg Song Contest, the national final to select Luxembourg's first Eurovision Song Contest entry after an absence of 31 years. She was also the spokesperson for the Luxembourgish national jury in the Grand Final.

== Publications ==
- Nosbusch, Désirée (2022). Endlich noch nicht angekommen (in German). Ullstein eBooks. ASIN B09KYHZQPK.

== Selected filmography ==
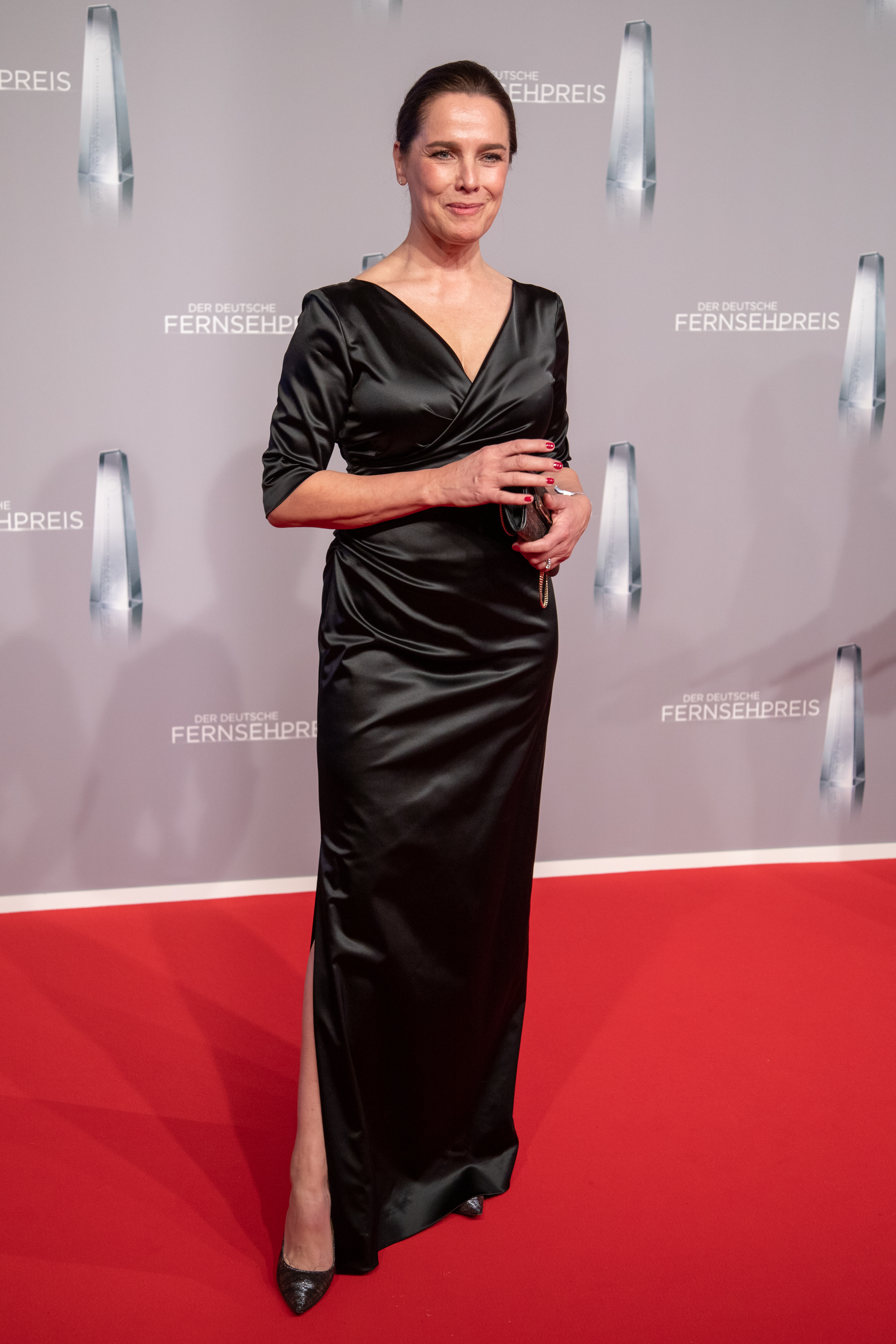
Nosbusch at the German television awards in 2019

- After Midnight (1981, directed by Wolf Gremm)
- Der Fan (1982, directed by Eckhart Schmidt)
- The Abduction of the Sabine Women (1983, TV film, directed by Rolf von Sydow)
- Sing Sing (1983, directed by Sergio Corbucci)
- Questo e Quello (1983, directed by Sergio Corbucci)
- Good Morning, Babylon (1987, directed by Paolo and Vittorio Taviani)
- A.D.A.M. (1988, directed by Herbert Ballmann)
- A Wopbopaloobop A Lopbamboom (1989, directed by Andy Bausch)
- Jean Galmot, aventurier (1990, directed by Alain Maline)
- La Femme fardée (1990, directed by José Pinheiro)
- Ex & Hopp (1991, TV film, directed by Andy Bausch)
- Piazza di Spagna (1992, TV miniseries, directed by Florestano Vancini)
- Felipe ha gli occhi azzurri 2 (1993, TV miniseries, directed by Gianfranco Albano and Felice Farina)
- Böses Blut (1993, TV film, directed by Dagmar Damek)
- The Way to Dusty Death (1995, TV film, directed by Geoffrey Reeve)
- Opernball (1998, TV film, directed by Urs Egger)
- Amico mio (1998, TV series, directed by Paolo Poeti)
- Contaminated Man (2000, directed by Anthony Hickox)
- High Explosive (2001, directed by Timothy Bond)
- Hostile Takeover (2001, directed by Carl Schenkel)
- The Code of Life (2002, directed by Miguel Alexandre)
- The Secret of St. Ambrose (2006, TV film, directed by Michael Wenning)
- The Cursed Treasure (2007, TV film, directed by Diethard Küster)
- Avalanche (2008, TV film, directed by Jörg Lühdorff)
- De Superjhemp retörns (2018, directed by Félix Koch)
- Bad Banks (2018, TV series)
- Capitani (2019, TV series)
- Der Irland-Krimi (since 2019, TV series, 8 episodes)
- Confessions of Felix Krull (2021, directed by Detlev Buck)

== See also ==
- List of Eurovision Song Contest presenters

Preceded by (Germany) Marlene Charell	Eurovision Song Contest presenter 1984	Succeeded by (Sweden) Lill Lindfors
