= Die Fahrt nach Bamsdorf =

1956 film

- Directed by: Konrad Petzold
- Written by: Konrad Petzold
- Cinematography: Erich Gusko
- Edited by: Ursula Kahlbaum
- Music by: Heinz-Friedel Heddenhausen
- Release date: 1956
- Running time: 39 Minutes
- Country: East Germany
- Language: German

Die Fahrt nach Bamsdorf (German pronunciation: [diː ˈfaːɐ̯t nax ˈbamsdɔʁf]) is an East German film. It was released in 1956. Its total run time is 39 minutes. The film made its TV premiere in Finland on October 6, 1963.

Cast
Actor	Character
Erika Müller-Fürstenau	Mutter
Charlotte Küter	Oma
Bernd Kuss	Toni
Peter Schmidt	Kalus
Petra Kyburg	Rita
Klaus Böhme	Rolf
Günter Wolf	Stippel
Hans-Joachim Pfeil	Michel
Sylvia Hunger	Bärbel
Claudia Seidel	Reni
Fredy Barten	Kontrolleur
Senta Cordel	Ältere Frau
Rolf Ripperger	Knipser
Siegfried Kosmowski	Freddy
Berthold Kaeske	Hütejunge
Bärbel Böthke	Brombeermädchen
