= Hundertwasser's Rainy Day =

1972 film

- Directed by: Peter Schamoni
- Produced by: Peter Schamoni
- Starring: Friedensreich Hundertwasser
- Production companies: Peter Schamoni Filmproduktion; Argos Films
- Distributed by: Peter Schamoni Filmproduktion
- Release date: 1972
- Running time: 43 minutes
- Country: West Germany
- Language: German

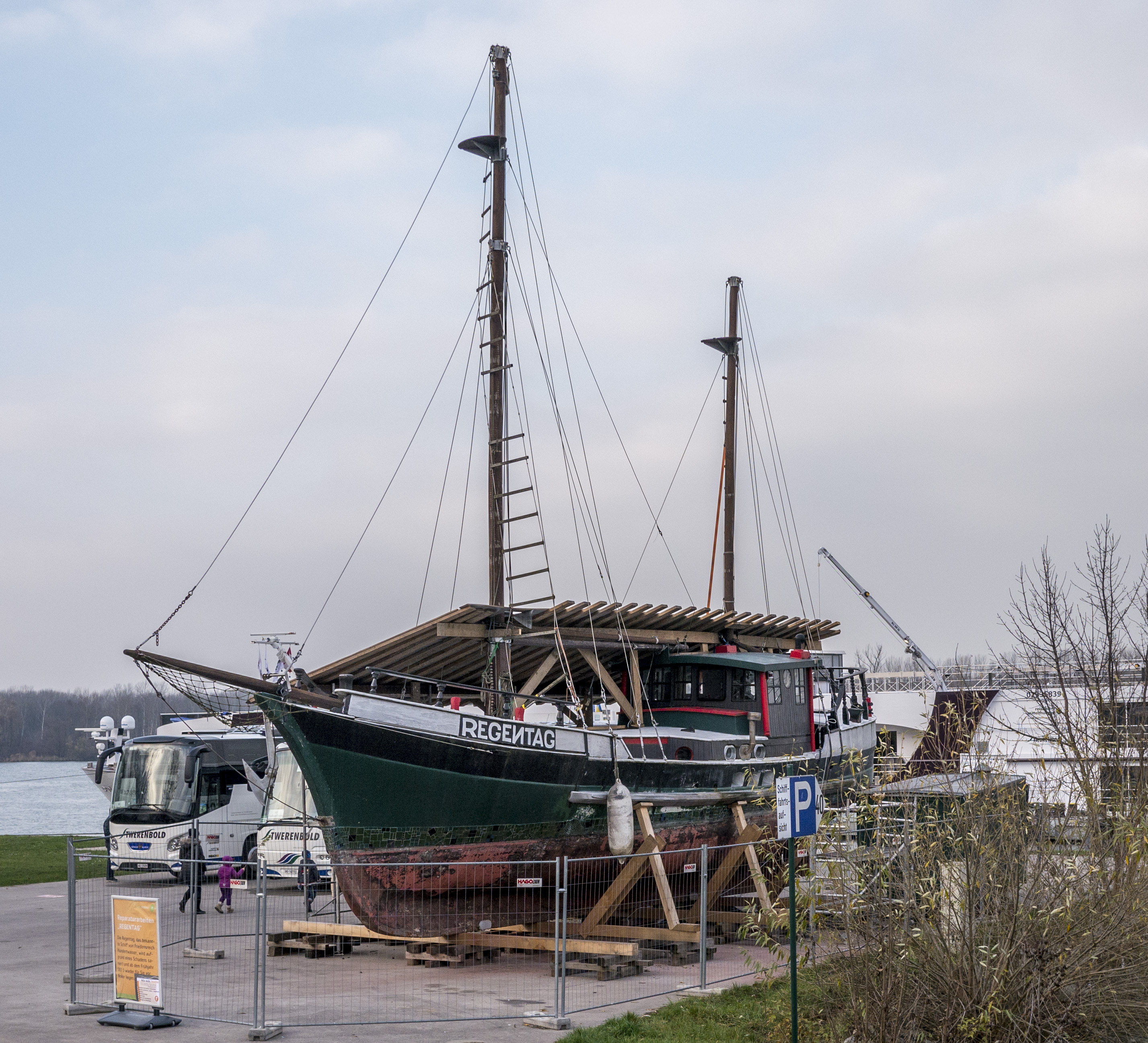
Tulln Hundertwasser, Rainy Day

Hundertwasser's Rainy Day (German: Hundertwassers Regentag) is a 1972 West German short documentary film about artist Friedensreich Hundertwasser rebuilding an old wooden ship called Regentag (Rainy Day). Directed by Peter Schamoni, it was nominated for an Academy Award for Best Documentary Short.
