= Enno Patalas =

German film historian and collector (1929–2018)

- Born: October 15, 1929; Quakenbrück, Germany
- Died: August 20, 2018 (aged 88); Munich, Germany
- Known for: Geschichte des Films
- Scientific career
- Fields: Film history
- Workplaces: Munich Film Museum

Enno Patalas (15 October 1929, in Quakenbrück – 7 August 2018, in Munich) was a German film historian, collector, and expert film preservationist. A former head of the Munich Film Museum (1973–1994), his restorations include films such as Metropolis, M – Eine Stadt sucht einen Mörder and Die Nibelungen, all directed by Fritz Lang. Patalas also restored the film The Battleship Potemkin for viewing at the Berlin Film Festival in 2005.

He, along with director Ulrich Gregor, wrote the influential film history book Geschichte des Films (History of Film).

== Filmography ==
| Year | Title | Role | Notes |
|---|---|---|---|
| 1968 | Till the Happy End | Pfarrer | |
| 1974 | The Enigma of Kaspar Hauser | Pastor Fuhrmann | |
| 1983 | Der Platzanweiser – Porträt eines Kinomanen | Enno Patalas | |
| 1984 | Der Havarist | Der Herr aus New York | |
| 1985 | Feel the Motion | | (final film role) |
