= Peter Schamoni =

German film director (1934–2011)

- Born: 27 March 1934; Berlin, Germany
- Died: 14 June 2011 (aged 77); Munich, Germany
- Occupations: Film director, producer, screenwriter
- Years active: 1957–2011

Peter Schamoni (27 March 1934 – 14 June 2011) was a German film director, producer, and screenwriter. He directed 35 films between 1957 and 2011. His 1966 film No Shooting Time for Foxes was entered into the 16th Berlin International Film Festival, where it won the Jury Grand Prix. Two years later he was a member of the jury at the 18th Berlin International Film Festival. In 1972, his film Hundertwasser's Rainy Day was nominated for the Academy Award for Best Documentary Short.

== Selected filmography ==
- Brutality in Stone (1961) (co-director: Alexander Kluge) (Short documentary)
- No Shooting Time for Foxes (1966)
- Next Year, Same Time (directed by Ulrich Schamoni, 1967) (Producer)
- Go for It, Baby (directed by May Spils, 1968) (Producer)
- Your Caresses (1969) (co-director: Herbert Vesely)
- We Two (1970)
- Hundertwasser's Rainy Day (1971) (Documentary)
- Potato Fritz (1976)
- Spring Symphony (1983)
- Boundaries of Time: Caspar David Friedrich (1986) (Documentary)
- Schloß Königswald (1988)
- Max Ernst: Mein Vagabundieren – Meine Unruhe (1991) (Documentary)
- Majestät brauchen Sonne (1999) (Documentary)
