= Hans Noever =

German film director

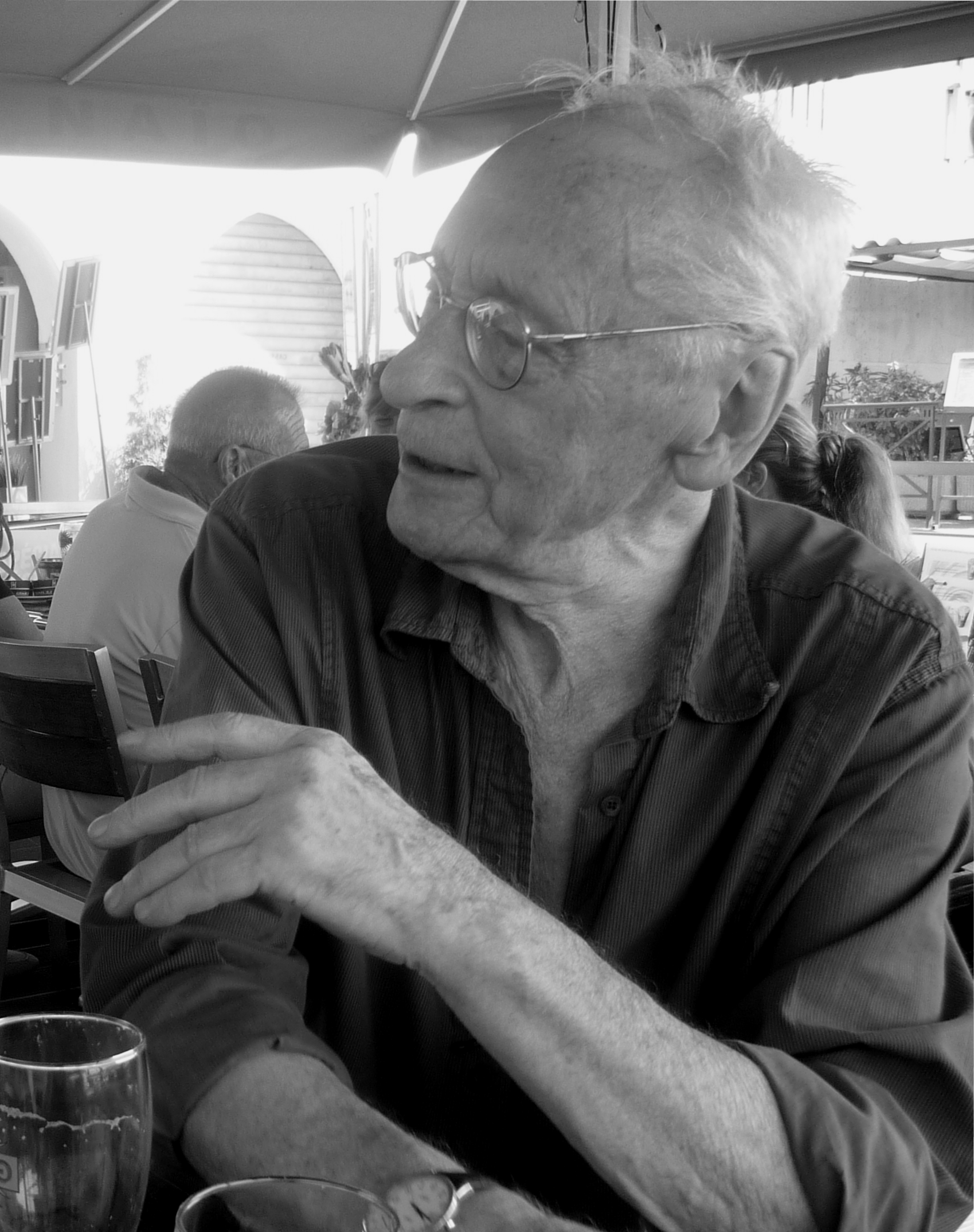
- Born: 10 May 1928 (age 98); Krefeld, Germany
- Occupations: Film director screenwriter actor
- Years active: 1967–2002

Hans Noever (born 10 May 1928) is a German writer, film director, screenwriter and actor. He directed thirteen films between 1973 and 1986. His 1980 film Der Preis fürs Überleben was entered into the 30th Berlin International Film Festival.

== Selected filmography ==
- The Smooth Career (dir. Haro Senft, 1967)
- Strange City (1972)
- Zahltag (1973)
- The Woman Across the Way (1978)
- The Night with Chandler (1979)
- Der Preis fürs Überleben (1980)
- Total vereist (1981)
- Wings of Night (1982)
- Gefahr für die Liebe – AIDS (1985)
- Lockwood Desert, Nevada (1986)
- Reporter (1989, TV series)
- Das Sahara-Projekt (1993, TV miniseries)
