= Der Fan =

- Theatrical release poster
- Directed by: Eckhart Schmidt
- Written by: Eckhart Schmidt
- Produced by: Barbara Moorse; Martin Moszkowicz
- Starring: Désirée Nosbusch; Bodo Staiger; Joachim Fuchsberger
- Cinematography: Bernd Heinl
- Edited by: Patricia Rommel; Eckhart Schmidt
- Music by: Rheingold
- Production company: Barbara Moorse Workshop
- Distributed by: Scotia International Filmverleih
- Release date: 4 June 1982 (West Germany)
- Running time: 92 minutes
- Country: West Germany
- Language: German

Der Fan (transl. The Fan) is a 1982 West German horror thriller film directed by Eckhart Schmidt. The film follows a disturbed teenage girl's obsessive love for a pop singer named R who, after meeting her, eventually reveals that he does not love her back, leading to disastrous consequences.

An uncut and restored version was released by Mondo Macabro on DVD and Blu-ray in 2015.

== Plot ==
Simone loves a new wave-style pop singer known only as R and does nothing else but listen to his music and write him fan letters. She does not eat, she does not sleep, and she starts skipping class. Every day she waits at the local post office in hopes that a letter from R has come for her. This fixation on R has consumed her entire persona, and she has internalized all her passions into a lifeless shell. When Simone finally meets R at an autograph session outside a television studio, she freezes up and faints.

R instantly takes a liking to her, inviting her into his dressing room and to the rehearsal of his show. Much to his entourage's dismay, he leaves without revealing his next move and takes Simone back to a friend's apartment to which he has the keys. After having sex with her, R tells Simone he will leave, crushing her fantasies of a life with him. She bludgeons him to death with a statue, then carves up his body and places his dismembered parts in the freezer. She then cooks and eats his body piece by piece. When only his bones are left, she grinds them into ashes and scatters them outside the television studio.

A bulletin reporting the mysterious disappearance of R emerges on the news just as a shaven-headed Simone returns to her parents. She writes him a final fan letter, stating that he will always be a part of her, and that she missed her period.

== Production ==
The film received funding from the Bayerische Filmförderung and the Filmförderungsanstalt (FFA). Director Eckhart Schmidt later said that after the FFA initially rejected the project, he revised the story so that its events were presented as a dream in order to secure financing.

Désirée Nosbusch later said that she had been assured before filming that very little of her body would be shown, but that nude images from the production were subsequently published without her knowledge. She said she felt humiliated by the experience, although she and Schmidt later reconciled.

Filmed under the working title Trance, the production took place in Ulm and Munich.

== Release ==
Der Fan premiered at the Europa cinema in Stuttgart on 4 June 1982.

In 2026, Fun City Editions completed a new 4K restoration of Der Fan from the original 35 mm camera negative, which stored the film's original stereo soundtrack from the original German theatrical release in 1982. The restored version opened at the Metrograph in New York City on 28 August, marking the film's first official theatrical release in the United States. It subsequently received additional theatrical bookings in the country.

=== Home media ===
The film's home-video release was placed on West Germany's list of media harmful to minors in January 1983, restricting its advertising and distribution to adults. It was removed from the list in 2003.

In Germany, the film was released on DVD in 2001 with German 5.1 and stereo audio tracks, interviews and a trailer. The film was released on Blu-ray in 2014, and then in a limited edition DVD/Blu-ray combo pack in 2016. In 2020, the film was released on Blu-ray again with a bonus film, Brainsmasher, included as an extra.

In Japan, the film was released on DVD in 2002 and Blu-ray in 2016, with the latter containing original German and English audio, as well as Japanese subtitles.

In the United Kingdom, the film was released on DVD in 2008, with English and German audio tracks available but no subtitles.

In the United States, Mondo Macabro released Der Fan in 2015 on Blu-ray and DVD. The release included a brand new high-definition transfer, German and English audio tracks, English subtitles, and an interview with director Eckhart Schmidt.

Fun City Editions announced a Blu-ray edition of the restoration for early 2027.

== Reception ==
During the films initial release in Germany, reviewers were critical of several aspects of the film. Writing for Die Zeit in June 1982, a reviewer criticised the film's opening and its parallels between political leadership cults and pop-star fandom, but praised the cold intensity and fascination of several later sequences. Filmdienst criticised the film's portrayal of obsessive fandom, arguing that its characterisation and social commentary were unconvincing and that it suffered from weaknesses in direction.

In 2010, the Deutsches Historisches Museum included Der Fan in its retrospective Punk, Pop, Rock: Die Neue Deutsche Welle und das Kino, examining the relationship between West German cinema and the Neue Deutsche Welle music movement. The museum highlighted the controversy surrounding the film's nudity and the casting of Désirée Nosbusch, herself a teenage television personality, as an obsessive fan.

Retrospective reviews have generally emphasized the film's psychological and sexual themes. Vice praised Schmidt's handling of the film's psychosexual tension and interpreted the relationship between Simone and R as reflecting themes of celebrity worship, propaganda and authoritarianism. Mondo Digital described the film as a slow-building psychological horror whose later developments have helped it acquire a cult following, drawing comparisons with Audition.

In 2025, the British Film Institute included Der Fan in its list of "10 great German horror films".

== See also ==
- Cannibalism in popular culture
- Perfect Blue
