= Der tapfere Schulschwänzer =

1967 film

- Directed by: Winfried Junge
- Release date: 1967
- Country: East Germany
- Language: German

Der tapfere Schulschwänzer is an East German film. It was released in 1967.
