= Roger Fritz =

German actor (1936–2021)

Roger Fritz (22 September 1936 – 26 November 2021) was a German actor, director, producer and photographer, perhaps best known for Cross of Iron, and his work with Rainer Werner Fassbinder in Querelle, Lili Marleen and Berlin Alexanderplatz.

Roger Fritz was born on 22 September 1936 in Mannheim, Baden, Germany. He was married to the actress, Helga Anders (1948–1986), from 1968 to 1974, when they divorced. They had one child, Leslie Fritz, who is an assistant director.

== Selected filmography ==
Director

- Girls, Girls (1967)
- Erotik auf der Schulbank (1968), Anthology film, segment Sybille
- Rabbit in the Pit (1969)
- The Brutes (1970)
- Motiv Liebe (1972, TV series)
- Frankfurt: The Face of a City (1981)

Actor

- ...und noch frech dazu! (1960, directed by Rolf von Sydow) - Michael
- Officer Factory (1960, directed by Frank Wisbar) - Fähnrich Andreas
- Jet Generation (1968, directed by Eckhart Schmidt) - Raoul Malsen
- Sugar Bread and Whip (1968, directed by Marran Gosov) - Roger
- Till the Happy End (1968, directed by Theodor Kotulla) - Paul
- Carnal Circuit (1969, directed by Alberto De Martino) - Giulio Lamberti
- Lovemaker (1969, directed by Ugo Liberatore) - Klaus
- Kompanie der Knallköppe (1971, directed by Rolf Olsen) - Heinz von Kattnig
- Strange City (1972, directed by Rudolf Thome) - Philipp Kramer / Franz Lerchenfeld
- Nessuno deve sapere (1972, TV miniseries, directed by Mario Landi) - Pietro Rusconi
- Cross of Iron (1977, directed by Sam Peckinpah) - Leutnant (Lt.) Triebig
- Despair (1978, directed by Rainer Werner Fassbinder) - Inspector Braun
- Berlin Alexanderplatz (1980, TV miniseries, directed by Rainer Werner Fassbinder) - Herbert Virchow
- Lili Marleen (1981, directed by Rainer Werner Fassbinder) - Kauffmann
- Querelle (1982, directed by Rainer Werner Fassbinder) - Marcellin
- Ich bin dein Killer (1982, directed by Jochen Richter) - Manager Didi
- Anna's Mother (1984, directed by Burkhard Driest) - Micha
- Die Story (1984, directed by Eckhart Schmidt) - Franz
- Der Havarist (1984, directed by Wolf-Eckart Bühler)
- Mama Mia – Don't Panic (1984, directed by Dieter Pröttel)
- Ich schenk dir die Sterne (1991, directed by Jörg Graser)
- Daniel – Der Zauberer (2004, directed by Ulli Lommel) - Producer (final film role)

Producer

- Jet Generation (1968, directed by Eckhart Schmidt)
- Madame Bovary (1969, directed by Hans Schott-Schöbinger)
