= Eckhart Schmidt =

German film director, producer and writer (1938–2024)

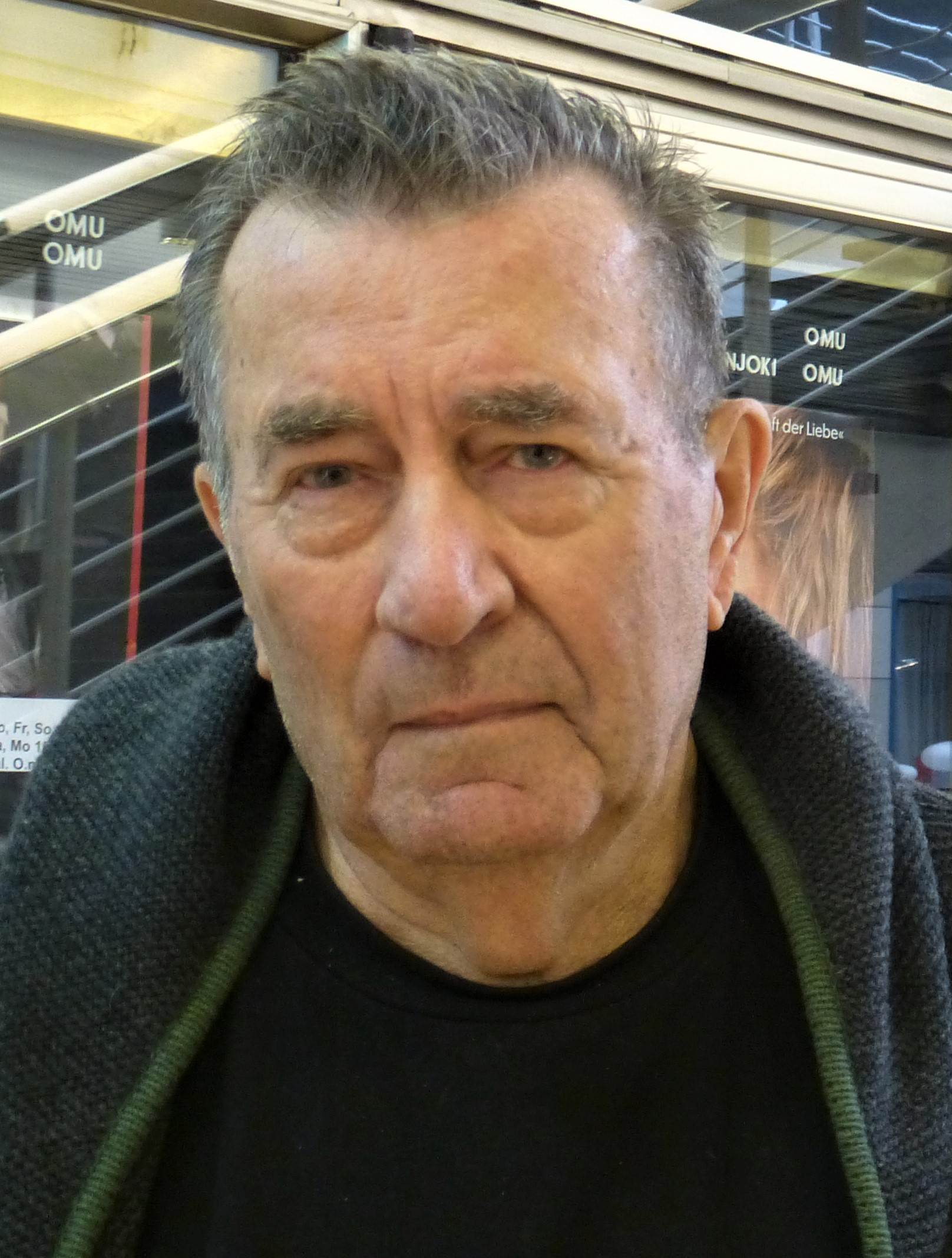
- Schmidt in 2020
- Born: 31 October 1938; Mährisch-Stenberg, Germany (now Šternberk, Czech Republic)
- Died: 24 October 2024 (aged 85); Munich, Bavaria, Germany
- Other name: Raoul Sternberg
- Occupations: Film director; producer; writer; photographer
- Years active: 1957–2024
- Known for: Der Fan

Eckhart Schmidt (31 October 1938 – 24 October 2024) was a German film director, producer, writer and photographer.

In 1982 he directed the film Der Fan, with Désirée Nosbusch in the lead role, which became a cult film in Germany and worldwide. The film is an adaptation from his novel of the same title.

== Life and career ==
In the beginning of his career Schmidt worked as a film critic for the newspaper Süddeutsche Zeitung, for the monthly magazine Film and for the Bayerischer Rundfunk television channel.

He started making films in the sixties and, after the success of Der Fan (1982) he made more than ten feature films in Germany.

In the nineties Schmidt made three feature films in Italy, influenced by Italian directors such as Valerio Zurlini, Michelangelo Antonioni, Luchino Visconti, Francesco Rosi, Federico Fellini etc.

In the early 2000s Schmidt started shooting his feature films in high definition, which were all filmed in Los Angeles.

While living in Rome in 2016, Schmidt made a collection of nine feature films under the title ROMAN CYCLE, which he brought from the cinema to the Blu-ray release.

While making feature films, he also directed and produced more than eighty documentary films on topics varying from the Myth of Hollywood, Italian Cinema, Classical Music and Cities, including Los Angeles and Las Vegas.

In 1989, in cooperation with NHK and Sony, Schmidt was the artistic director of the first major HDTV production in the world of Richard Wagner's The Ring of the Nibelung. He made more than twenty documentaries about opera stars, composers, conductors, opera productions and opera houses such as the Los Angeles Opera.

In the seventies Schmidt began a collaboration with Joachim Fuchsberger for numerous TV variety shows. This partnership lasted for fifteen years.

Schmidt's literary activities began in the seventies as a founder and publisher of the punk magazine S!A!U! He had the opportunity to work with – among others – Rainer Werner Fassbinder, Herbert Achternbusch, Werner Schroeter, David Byrne, Devo and Patti Smith.

In the following years Schmidt continued to write and publish novels and poetry. The focus of his works centers on young women and their hopes, anxieties and fears. His poetry is accompanied by his works as a photographer.

In the 2011 Schmidt developed a new creative format, FOTOVISION, a combination of poetry, photography and music.

Schmidt lived and worked in Rome, Palermo, Los Angeles and from 2016, Munich. He died there on 24 October 2024, at the age of 85.

== Filmography ==
=== Short films ===
- Nachmittags (1964)
- Die Flucht (1965)
- Nachtblau (1991)
- Zwischenmusik (1995)

=== Feature films ===
- Girls, Girls, directed by Roger Fritz (1967)
- Jet Generation (1968)
- Erotik auf der Schulbank (1968), Segment Fantasie
- Männer sind zum Lieben da (1970)
- Der Fan (1982)
- Das Gold der Liebe (1983)
- Die Story (1984)
- Loft (1985)
- Alpha City (1985)
- Die Küken kommen (1985), as Raoul Sternberg
- Das Wunder (1985)
- Wie treu ist Nik? (1986)
- Undine (1992)
- E. T. A. Hoffmanns Der Sandmann (1993)
- Broken Hearts (1996)
- Küsse, Bisse (1996)
- Internet Love (2000)
- Girls – Mädchen – Ragazze (2000)
- 24/7 – Sunset Boulevard (2002)
- Sunset Motel (2003)
- Hollywood Fling: Diary of a Serial Killer (2010), as Raoul Sternberg
- Love and Death in the Afternoon (2017)
- Princess – Voices from Hell (2017)
- My Most Beautiful Summer (2017)
- Stella (2017)
- Stella Reloaded (2017)
- Angels Flight (2017)
- It's me (2017)
- Loving Valeria (2017)
- Amor sacro, Amor profano (2017)
- Mitologia 1 (2018)
- Mitologia 2 (2018)
- Colour of Love (2018)
- The Girl and the Octopus (2018)
- La Musa (2018)
- La Terza Faccia (2018)
- Abbundanza (2018)
- What Dreams may Come (2018)
- Solitudine 1 (2018)
- Solitudine 2 (2018)
- First Kiss and all ... (2019)
- Love's Places (2019)
- The Beast and the Beauty (2019)
- A Little Piece of Horror (2019)
- Noir after Noon (2020)
- Teatro del Sole (2020)
- Paradise Noir (2020)
- Solitudine Donna (2020)
- Solitudine Poeta (2020)
- Palermo.Gente. (2020)
- Trittico della Morte (2020)
- Generation Z – Da war ein Himmel (2020)
- Hallo, Leute! (2020)
- Ragazze dei Fiori (2020)
- Dance, Salome! (2021)
- TreCamerone 1 (2021)
- TreCamerone 2 (2021)
- TreCamerone 3 (2021)
- Venezia.Lido. (2021)
- Angelo (2021)
- Where is Italo Tedesco? (2021)
- Day by Day – A digital Diary (2021)
- Day by Day 2 – A digital Diary (2021)
- Girotondo d'amore (2021)
- To be (2021)
- Obsessions (2021)
- Alla Bellezza (2021)
- La Bella Amazzone (2021)
- Update Amore (2021)
- Die schönste Zeit meines Lebens (2021)
- La mia bella Romana (2021)
- Il Cuore del Leone (2021)
- Garten der Engel (2021)
- Mädchen.München. (2021)
- Day by Day 3 (2021)
- Day by Day 4 (2021)
- Day by Day 5 (2021)
- Day by Day 6 (2021)
- Venezia – Seasons of Love (2021)
- The Demon's Kiss (2021)
- Chi è la più bella? (2022)
- La Noia – Ach, diese Langeweile (2022)
- Un pomeriggio a Roma (2022)
- Ghosting (2022)
- Kisses and all ... (2022)
- Amor Veneziano (2022)
- Medusa (2022)
- L’amor che move il sole (2022)
- I quattro canti della vita (2022)
- Palermo.Amor. (2022)
- Day by Day 7 (2022)
- Kriemhild (2022)

=== Cinematographic adaptation of the operas ===
- Der Ring des Nibelungen (1990)
- Der Fliegende Holländer (1991)
- Der Prinz von Homburg (1994)

=== Documentaries ===
- Douglas Sirk – Über Stars (1980)
- Neue Welle ’82 – Rabiate Langeweile (1982)
- From UFA to Hollywood – Douglas Sirk remembers (1991)
- Der Garderobier – Karlheinz Stempel erzählt (1993)
- Sawallisch (1993)
- Epstein in Hollywood – Julius J. Epstein Talks (1994)
- Christa Ludwig – Der Abschied (1995)
- Schumann-Hampson-Sawallisch (1996)
- Kundry (1996)
- Hollywood Dreamers (1997)
- Black Hollywood (1997)
- Wu-Thang Clan: This Shit is from the Heart (1997)
- Sunset Boulevard – 27 Meilen Amerika (1997)
- Hollywood, Germany (1997)
- Freiheit in Hollywood – Rudolph S. Joseph über Douglas Sirk und G. W. Pabst (1997)
- Der Klassik-Kaiser (1997)
- Karl Haas – Abenteuer Musik (1998)
- Walter Haupt – Der Film (1999)
- View and Vision: The Architectural Photography of Julius Shulman (1999)
- Mythos Hollywood (1999)
- Gottfried Pilz – Vision und Faszination (1999)
- Vom Überleben – Die Geschichte der Mania Hartmayer-Breuer (2000)
- Lost Angeles – Eine Stadt zwischen Traum und Trauma (2000)
- Las Vegas – Die erste Stadt des 21. Jahrhunderts (2000)
- Kurt Moll – Ein Mann, ein Bass (2000)
- Hollywood Boulevard – Die Hauptstrasse der Traumfabrik (2000)
- Besuch bei Tippi Hedren (2000)
- Besuch bei Don Murray (2000)
- Besuch bei Bud Boetticher (2000)
- Besuch bei Rod Steiger (2001)
- Besuch bei Ray Bradbury (2001)
- Besuch bei James Ellroy (2001)
- California Classic (2001)
- Inge Borkh – Es singt aus mir (2002)
- Wolfgang Sawallisch – Ein Leben für die Musik (2002)
- Young Hollywood – Die Traumfabrik erfindet sich neu (2002)
- Die Mafia-Prinzessin – Susan Bermans Las Vegas Testament (2002)
- Francesco Rosi – Momente der Wahrheit (2002)
- Federico Fellini – Mit den Augen der Anderen (2003)
- Die Welt des Claude Chabrol (2003)
- Motel California (2003)
- Hubert Selby Jr. – Last Exit to L. A. (2003)
- Musen, Macht und Glamour – Die Welt der Maximilianstrasse (2004)
- Männer in Trenchcoat, Frauen im Pelz (2004)
- Hollywood Legenden (2004)
- Hitlers letzte Tage – Der Film ‚Der Untergang‘ (2005)
- Sena Jurinac – Jedes Ding hat seine Zeit (2005)
- Die Meistersinger von München (2005)
- Filmlegenden. Deutsch (2005)
- Silent Hollywood: Cult, Stars, Scandals (2005)
- Mythos Mozart – Musik für die Welt (2006)
- Jenseits von Hollywood – Das Kino des Otto Preminger (2006)
- Hollywoods Oper – Eine Oper für Los Angeles (2006)
- Jerry Lewis – König der Komödianten (2006)
- Jane Russell – Der Star aus dem Heu (2006)
- Fred Zinnemann – Der Mann, der ‚High Noon‘ machte (2007)
- Tatort Oper – Wie Filmemacher Oper machen (2007)
- Fernsehgeschichte(n). Deutsch (2007)
- Joachim Fuchsberger erzählt ... (2007)
- Glamour vs. Paparazzi (2008)
- Hildegard Behrens – Ausdruck und Schönheit (2008)
- Hollywood Gangster (2008)
- Heimat – Deine Filme: Der Traum vom Paradies (2008)
- Heimat – Deine Filme: Stars, Spass und Wirklichkeit (2008)
- Der Regisseur Uli Edel – Phantasie und Fakten (2009)
- Western-Legenden – Made in Hollywood (2009)
- Ruth Leuwerik erzählt ... (2009)
- Margot Hielscher erzählt ... (2009)
- Glanz und Elend in Hollywood – Natalie Wood (2009)
- Faszinierende Frauen, Faszinierende Stimmen (2009)
- Verbotene Musik (2009)
- Marilyn Monroe – Ich möchte geliebt werden (2010)
- Marilyn Monroe – Tod einer Ikone (2010)
- Mulholland Drive – Ein Hollywood Mythos (2010)
- Mythos Metropolis (2010)
- Percy Adlon erzählt ... (2010)
- Tony Curtis erzählt ... (2010)
- Elke Sommer erzählt ... (2010)
- Bernd Eichinger erzählt ... (2011)
- Hollywood Skandals (2011)
- Hollywoods Walk of Fame (2011)
- The Last Graffiti Show (2012)
- Stardust Hollywood – Sternenstaub und Götterwelten (2013)
- Hollywood Rebells (2013)
- Cinema Italiano – Momenti della Verità (2014)
- Helmut Dietl erzählt ... (2015)
- Made in Hollywood: Hitchcocks Blondinen (2016)
- Made in Hollywood: The World of Raoul Walsh (2017)
- Made in Hollywood: The World of Budd Boetticher (2017)
- Made in Hollywood: The World of William Wellman (2017)
- Sonja Ziemann erzählt ... (2017)
- Peter Kraus erzählt ... (2017)
- Los Angeles narrates ... (2017)
- Karin Michalke: Beste Zeit auf der Alm (2017)
- Julie Taymor: Shakespeare's Kino (2017)
- Harold Nebenzal erzählt ... (2017)
- Artur Brauner erzählt ... (2017)
- Robert Sigl erzählt ... (2017)
- Carroll Baker: vom Baby Doll zur Lady Glamour (2017)
- F. Scott Fitzgerald: Seine Sekretärin Frances Kroll Ring erzählt ... (2017)
- Ludwig I. – Italienische Elegie (2018)

=== Fotovision ===
- Fotovision: Photographie, Poesie, Musik (2011)
- Motel Girls (2012)
- All about Girls (2013)

== Books ==
- Der Fan – Tagebuch einer Sechzehnjährigen, Droemer Knaur, München, 1982, ISBN 978-3426024522
- Das Gold der Liebe, Droemer Knaur, München, 1983, ISBN 978-3426024539
- Die Story, Droemer Knaur, München, 1984, ISBN 3-426-02455-1
- Das Tagebuch des Feuerpferds, Dieve Verlag, 1988, ISBN 978-3927131088
- Die Einsamkeit des Eisbären und andere faszinierende Geschichten (= Geheimnisvolle Tierwelt), Bastei Luebbe Verlagsgruppe, Köln, 1989, ISBN 3-404-63204-4
- Der Bayerische Filmpreis '94, '95 und '96; Olzog – Aktuell GmbH, 1999, ISBN 3-7892-7393-7
- Window Girls – Fotobuch, Belleville, 2008, ISBN 978-3936298598
- Mulholland Drive – Opening Scenes: Fotobuch, Belleville, 2009, ISBN 978-3936298826
- ROMA/AMOR – Fotobuch, Belleville, 2010, ISBN 978-3936298154
- Hotel/Minorella – Tagebuch einer 16-Jährigen (Zwei Romane), ES Publishing, München, 2011, ISBN 978-3000351549, as Raoul Sternberg
- Bad Girls Are Good Girls – A Poetry album, ES Publishing, München, 2013, ISBN 978-3000436949
- Niemals allein, für immer einsam – Generation Y, ES Publishing, München, 2013, ISBN 978-3000439179
- NASS – Tagebuch einer 16-Jährigen, ES Publishing, München, 2014, ISBN 978-3000442186, as Raoul Sternberg
- Corridos – Erzählungen, ES Publishing, München, 2014, ISBN 978-3000361180, as Raoul Sternberg
- Love and Hate in L. A., Belleville, 2014 ISBN 978-3943157789
- Hollywood Girl, ES Publishing, München, 2016, ISBN 978-3000529146
- Amore Verticale, ES Publishing, München, 2017, ISBN 978-3000558283
- La La Land Stories, ES Publishing, München, 2017, ISBN 978-3000570841
- Stichworte, ES Publishing, München, 2018, ISBN 978-3000590849
- Pomeriggio a Roma, ES Publishing, 2018, ISBN 978-3000590856
- Motel Girls – Gedichte und Fotografien, 2018, ISBN 978-3943157000
- Erster Kuss und so ..., 2019, ISBN 978-3982058009
- Gefängnis Zoo, 2019, ISBN 978-3982058016
- BlumenMädchen, ES Publishing, 2020, ISBN 978-3-9820580-2-3
- Küsse.Bisse, ES Publishing, 2021, ISBN 978-3-9820580-3-0
