= 20th Locarno Film Festival =

Film festival in Locarno, Switzerland

- Location: Locarno, Switzerland
- Founded: 1946
- Artistic director: Sandro Bianconi; Freddy Buache
- Festival date: Opening: 22 July 1967; Closing: 31 July 1967
- Website: Locarno Film Festival

Locarno Film Festival
- 21st 19th

The 20th Locarno Film Festival was held from 22 July to 31 July 1967 in Locarno, Switzerland. Thirteen feature films premiered at the festival. Following the previous year's change, the festival continued its non-competitive, no-prize format. However, the gathered international critics voted to award Entranced Earth directed by Glauber Rocha best picture.

== Official Sections ==
The following films were screened in these sections:

=== Main Program ===
==== Feature Films ====
English Title	Original Title	Director(s)	Year	Production Country
We Still Kill the Old Way	A Ciascuno Il Suo	Elio Petri	1967	Italy
The Defeat	A Derrota	Mario Fiorani	1967	Brazil
Next Year, Same Time	Alle Jahre Wieder	Ulrich Schamoni	1967	Germany
Father	Apa	Istvan Szabo	1966	Hungary
Devil's Angels		Daniel Haller	1967	USA
Face to Face	Face A Face	Robert Manthoulis		Greece
Kane		Yuko Asano	1967	Japan
The Climax	L'immorale	Pietro Germi	1967	Italy
The Unknown Man of Shandigor	L'Inconnu De Shandigor	Jean-Louis Roy	1967	Switzerland
The Harvest	La Cosecha	Marcos Madanes	1967	Argentina
The Moon with Teeth	La Lune Avec Les Dents	Michel Soutter		Switzerland
The Crazy Night of the Tanning	La Notte Pazza Del Conigliaccio	Alfredo Angeli	1967	Italy
The Grand Dadais	Le Grand Dadais	Pierre Granier-Deferre	1967	France
The Last Adventure	Les Aventuriers	Robert Enrico	1967	France
Marat/Sade	Marat-Sade	Peter Brook	1967	Great Britain
Martyrs of Love	Mucednici Lasky	Jan Němec	1966	Czech Republic
Tales of the Ninja	忍者武芸帳	Nagisa Ōshima		Japan
Miraculous Virgin	Panna Zazracnica	Stefan Uher	1966	Czech Republic
The Dream	San	Purisa Djordjevic	1966	Yugoslavia
Sons And Daughters		Jerry Stoll		USA
Cipher	Szyfry	Wojciek J. Has	1966	Poland
Entranced Earth	Terra Em Transe	Glauber Rocha	1967	Brazil
The Flim-Flam Man		Irvin Kershner	1967	USA
Military and Peace	Vojna I Mir	Sergueï Bondartchouck	1967	Russia

==== Shorts ====
Main / Short Films Program
Original Title	English Title	Director(s)	Production Country
1 +1 = 3		Zdenko Gasparovic, Branko Ranibtovic	Switzerland, Yugoslavia
750.00.00		Alexis Grivas, Vanguelis Iliopoulos	Greece
A Kind Of Seeing		Edward Mc Connell	Great Britain
Behind The Spacemen		William Jersey	USA
Bilder Zur Odyssee	Pictures of Odyssey	Luitbert von Haebler	Germany
Charpentier Du Ciel	Sky Carpenter	Don Owen	Canada
Chicoree		Fredi M. Murer	Switzerland
Coda		Marc Pauly	France
Czar Kòlek	Charm	Kazimierz Urbànski	Poland
Do Leicka Na Cekanou	To Leicka on Cekanou	Jiri Brdecka	Czech Republic
Dodge City		Jeff Dell	USA
Fragment		Jean-Daniel Verhaeghe	France
Hounted House Cleaning			USA
Klatki	Cages	Miroslaw Kijowicz	Poland
La Folle Passion	The Crazy Passion	Anne Tesgot	France
Mere Et Fils	Mother and Son	Jan Nemec	Netherlands
Ombres Et Mirages	Shadows and Mirages	Moritz De Hadeln	Switzerland
Paris Sous La Lune	Paris under the Moon	F. Warin	France
Precision		Georges Dufaux	Canada
Proc Se Usmivas, Mono Liso?	We Try to Usmives, Smooth Monkey?	Jiri Brdecka	Czech Republic
Rail		Geoffrey Jones	Great Britain
Reflections		Neel Black	USA
Rodzina Czlowiecza	Family Family	Wladyslaw Slesicki	Poland
Sonnenstern, Le Moralunaire		Ernest Ansorge, Dr. Alfred Bader	Switzerland
Sur Le Vif	On the Spot	Guy Chalon, Gérard Gozlan	France
Tamako	Boyfriend	Keiko Yamanaka	Japan
Through The Eyes Of A Painter		Shri Hussai	India
Ultra Je T'Aime	Ultra I Love you	Patrick Ledoux	Belgium
Un Musee A L'Ombre Des Bouleaux	A Museum in the Shade of the Birches	Claude B. Levenson, Stanley Miesegaes	Switzerland
Un Prisonnier Exemplaire	An Exemplary Prisoner	Maurice Frydland	France
Watch The Butterfly			USA

=== Out of Competition (Fuori Concorso) ===
==== Feature Films Out of Program ====
Original Title	English Title	Director(s)	Year	Production Country
Navrat Ztraceneo Syna	The Return of the Prodigal Son	Evald Schorm	1966	Czech Republic
Neznost'	Unlucky	El'er Ismuhamedov	1967	Russia
Romance Prokridlovku	Romance Pro Wing	Otakar Vávra	1967	Czech Republic

==== Short Films Out of Program ====
Original Title	English Title	Director(s)	Year	Production Country
2 + 2 = 5		Hassan Dalboul		Tunisia
Becarac		Ztlatko Bourek		Yugoslavia
Il Signor Rossi Compera L'Automobile	Mr. Rossi Bothers the Car	Bruno Bozzetto		Italy

=== Special Sections ===
CINEMA E Gioventù - TV Movies - Young Directors of RAI / TV (Italy)
Original Title	English Title	Director(s)	Year	Production Country
Celentano, Torno Sui Miei Passi	Celentano, I Go Back to My Steps	Vincenzo Gamma		Italy
I Figli Degli Industriali	The Children of Industrialists	Gianni Serra		Italy
I Giovani, Il Cinema E La Violenza	Young People, Cinema and Violence	Paolo Gazzara		Italy
Tutti Vanno, Io Rimango	Everyone Goes, I Stay	Filippo De Luigi		Italy
Cinema E Gioventù - TV Movies
Francesco D'Assisi	Francis of Assisi	Liliana Cavani	1966	Italy
Louis Ii De Baviere	T	Frédéric Rossif		France
War Game		Peter Watkins	1965	Great Britain
Conference C.i.d.a.lc.
Le Mani Sulla Città	Hands on the City	Francesco Rosi	1963	Italy
Les 400 Coups	The 400 Blows	François Truffaut	1959	France
Los Olvidados		Luis Buñuel	1950	Mexico
Tribute To Soviet Cinematography On the Occasion of the Fiftieth Anniversary of the October Revolution
Arsenal		Alexander Dovzhenko	1929	Russia
Banya		Serge Youtkévitch	1962	Russia
Chapayev	Chapyev	Sergei Vasiliev, Georgy Vasiliev	1934	Russia
Chelovek S Kinoapparatom	A Man with a Film Apparatus	Dziga Vertov	1929	Russia
Deputat Baltiki	Deputy of the Baltic	Josif Heifits, Alexander Zarkhi	1937	Russia
Kommunist	Communist	Youly Raizman	1958	Russia
Mat		Mark Donskoï	1956	Russia
Pervyi Uchitel	The First Teacher	Andrei Mikhalkov-Kontchalovsky	1965	Russia
Pyshka		Mihail Romm	1934	Russia
Sorok Pervyi	The Forty-First	Yakov Protazanov	1927	Russia
Vernost	Faithfulness	Pyotr Todorovsky	1965	Russia
Weliki Poworot		S. Gourov	1957	Russia

== Official Awards ==
=== FIPRESCI Jury ===
- International Critics Award: ENTRANCED EARTH by Glauber Rocha
- Swiss Critics Award: THE RETURN OF THE PRODIGAL SON by Evald Schorm, ENTRANCED EARTH by Glauber Roch

=== Youth Jury, feature films ===
- Youth Jury Award, feature films: ENTRANCED EARTH by Glauber Rocha
- Special Jury Prize, feature films: FATHER by Istvan Szabo
- Youth Jury Mention, feature films: THE RETURN OF THE PRODIGAL SON by Evald Schorm, MUCEDNICI LASKY by Jan Némec, MARAT-SADE by Peter Brook
- Recommendation of the Youth Jury, feature films: L’INCONNU DE SHANDIGOR by Jena-Louis Roy,SAN by Purisa Djordjevic,FACE A FACE by Robert Manthoulis

=== Youth Jury, shortfilms ===
- Youth Jury Mention, short films: IL SIGNOR ROSSI COMPERA L’AUTOMOBILE by Bruno Bozzetto, CHICOREE by Fredi M. Murer, MERE ET FILS by Jan Némec
