= 19th Locarno Film Festival =

Film festival in Locarno, Switzerland

- Location: Locarno, Switzerland
- Founded: 1946
- Artistic director: Sandro Bianconi
- Festival date: Opening: 23 July 1966; Closing: 31 July 1966
- Website: Locarno Film Festival

Locarno Film Festival
- 20th 18th

The 19th Locarno Film Festival was held from 23 July to 31 July 1966, in Locarno, Switzerland. This year was the first festival after the departure of long-time festival director Vincio Berretta. There was speculation that Berretta's departure was due to recurring accusations that he was too "left-wing", as he let in films from China, Russia, and the Eastern Bloc to the festival long before other Western film festivals began to, along with the desire for more Hollywood productions in the festival.

No official awards were given out this year, but the independent Youth Jury awarded Courage for Every Day directed by Ewald Schorm the grand prize.

== Official sections ==
The following films were screened in these sections:

=== Main Program ===
==== Feature films In competition ====
| Original Title | English Title | Director(s) | Year | Production Country |
|---|---|---|---|---|
| Ai No Kawari | Thirst for Love | Izen Kurahara | 1966 | Japan |
| Bloko | Block | Ado Kyrou | 1965 | Greece |
| Chevssurskaja Ballada | | S. Managadze | 1965 | Russia |
| Devojka | Girl | Purisa Djordjevic | 1965 | Yugoslavia |
| Duminica La Ora 6 | Sunday at 6 O'clock | Lucian Pintille | 1965 | Romania |
| Es | It | Ulrich Schamoni | 1966 | Germany |
| Fumo Di Londra | Smoke Over London | Alberto Sordi | 1966 | Italy |
| Gyerekbetegsekeg | Childhood Illnesses | Ferenc Kardos, Janos Rosza | 1965 | Hungary |
| Io, Io, Io &...E Gli Altri | Me, Me, Me... and the Others | Alessandro Blasetti | 1966 | Italy |
| It Happened Here | | Kevin Brownlow, Andrew Mollo | 1965 | Great Britain |
| Kazdy Den Odvahu | Courage for Every Day | Ewald Schorm | 1964 | Czech Republic |
| Kym Sa Skonci Tato Noc | Before This Night Is Over | Ivan Passer, Peter Solan | 1965 | Czech Republic |
| La Ligne De Demarcation | Line of Demarcation | Claude Chabrol | 1966 | France |
| Les Coeurs Verts | Naked Hearts | Edouard Luntz | 1966 | France |
| Made In Italy | | Nanni Loy | 1965 | Italy |
| Morgan, A Suitable Case For Treatment | | Karel Reisz | 1966 | Great Britain |
| Pingwin | Penguin | Jerzi Stefan Stawinski | 1965 | Poland |
| Siavacch A Persepolis | Siyavosh at Persepolis | Férydoun Rahnéma | 1966 | Iran |
| Teni Zabytyh Predokov | Shadows of Forgotten Ancestors | Serguei Paradjanov | 1964 | Russia |
| Tero Nadir Pare | Beyond Thirteen Rivers | Barin Saha | 1962 | India |
| Three Hats For Lisa | | Sidney Hayers | 1965 | Great Britain |
| Ukamau | | Jorge Sanjinés | 1966 | Bolivia |
| Un Homme Et Une Femme | A Man and a Woman | Claude Lelouch | 1966 | France |
| 四谷怪談 | Yotsuya Kaidan | Shirō Toyoda | 1966 | Japan |

==== Shorts ====
Main / Short Films Program
| Original Title | English Title | Director(s) | Year | Production Country |
|---|---|---|---|---|
| A +B = Boum! | A + B = Boom! | Gérard Vallet | | Switzerland |
| Am Rande | On the Edge | Hans Jürgen Preibe | | Germany |
| Antoine Et Cleopatre | Antoine and Cleopatre | Francis Reusser | | Switzerland |
| Carla 66 | | Jean-François Hauduroy | | France |
| Elegia | Elegy | Zoltan Huszarik | | Hungary |
| Erase Una Vez | Erase Once | Pedro Chaska, Héctor Ríos | | Chile |
| Fadni Odpoledne | Afternoon | Ivan Passer | | Czech Republic |
| Kalwaria | Calvary | J. Hoffman, E. Skorzewsky | | Poland |
| Kesonci | | Bakir Tanovis | | Yugoslavia |
| Kwartecik | Quartecik | Edward Sturlis | | Poland |
| Lapicque | | François Reichenbach | | France |
| Le Dictionnaire De Joachim | Joachim's Dictionary | Walerian Borowczyk | | France |
| Le Panier A Viande | The Meat Basket | Jacqueline Veuve, Yves Yersin | | Switzerland |
| Les Batisseurs Du Temps | Time Builders | Georges Pessis | | Israel |
| Les Quatre Filsaymon | The Four Sons Aymon | Patrick Ledoux | | Belgium |
| Lidice | | Pavel Hasa | | Czech Republic |
| Revolucion | Revolution | Jorge Sanjinés, Oscar Soria | 1963 | Bolivia |
| Rosalie | | Walerian Borowczyk | | France |
| Strelbichte | Shooting | Ivan Andonov | | Bulgaria |
| Sztandar | Banner | Miroslaw Kijowicz | | Poland |
| Umberto Mauro | | David Neves | | Brazil |
| Un Jeu Simple | A Simple Game | Gilles Groulx | | Canada |
| Zid | Wall | Ante Zaninovik | | Yugoslavia |

=== Out of Program ===
Off -Program Films
| Kata A Korkodiyl | Said a Korkodiyl | Vera Smikova | 1965 | Czech Republic |
| Kdo Chce Zabit Jessii | Who Wants to Kill Jessie? | Václav Vorlíček | 1966 | Czech Republic |
| La Guerre Est Finie | The War Is Over | Alain Resnais | 1966 | France |
| Manuela | | Humberto Solás | 1966 | Cuba |

=== Special Sections ===
Information (Feature Films)
| Original Title | English Title | Director(s) | Year | Production Country |
|---|---|---|---|---|
| Astataïon Ou Le Festin Des Morts | Astataïon or the Feast of the Dead | Fernand Dansereau | 1965 | Canada |
| Eroe Vagabondo | Wanderer Hero | Walter Santesso | 1966 | Italy |
| Oj, Oj, Oj | | Torbjorn Axelman | 1966 | Sudan |
| Peer Gynt | Formerly Peer | David Bradley | 1942 | United States |
| Szegenylegenyek | The Round-Up | Miklos Jancso | 1966 | Hungary |
| Tiempo De Morir | Time to Die | Arturo Ripstein | 1966 | Mexico |

=== Tribute To G. W. Pabst ===
Tribute To G. W. Pabst (1885-1967)
| Abwege/Begierde | Abbey/Desire | G. W. Pabst | 1928 | Germany |
| Das Tageuch Einer Verlorenen | The Diary of a Lost | G. W. Pabst | 1929 | Germany |
| Der Schatz | The Treasure | G. W. Pabst | 1923 | Germany |
| Die Freudlose Gasse | The Joyless Alley | G. W. Pabst | 1925 | Germany |
| Die Liebe Der Jeanne Ney | The Love of Jeanne Ney | G. W. Pabst | 1927 | Germany |
| Die Weisse Hölle Von Piz-Palü | The White Hell of Piz-Palü | Arnold Fanck, G. W. Pabst | 1929 | Germany |
| Don Quichotte | Don Quixote | G. W. Pabst | 1933 | France, Great Britain |
| Dreigroschenoper | Triadop | G. W. Pabst | 1931 | United States, Germany |
| Du Haut En Bas | From Top to Bottom | G. W. Pabst | 1933 | France |
| Geheimnisse Einer Seele | Secrets of a Soul | G. W. Pabst | 1926 | Germany |
| Kameradschaft | Camaraderie | G. W. Pabst | 1931 | Germany |
| L'Atlantide | Atlantis | G. W. Pabst | 1932 | France |
| L'Opera De Quat'Sous | The Opera of Quat'Sous | G. W. Pabst | 1931 | United States, Germany |
| Westfront 1918 | Western Front 1918 | G. W. Pabst | 1930 | Germany |

== Awards ==
=== Youth Jury ===
- Youth Jury Award, feature films: COURAGE FOR EVERY DAY by Ewald Schorm
- Youth Jury special award, feature films: MORGAN, A SUITABLE CASE FOR TREATMENT by Karel Reisz
- Youth Jury Mention, feature films: WHO WANTS TO KILL JESSIE? by Vaclav Vorlicek, IT by Ultich Schamoni, THE WAR IS OVER by Alain Resnais
- Youth Jury award, short films: FADNI ODPOLEDNE by Ivan Passer
- Youth Jury Mention, short films: KWARTECIK Edward Sturlis,REVOLUCION by Oscar Soria and Jorge Sanjinés,ERASE UNA VEZ by Pedro Chaska and Hector Rios,ROSALIE by Walerian Borowczyk
- Youth Jury Recommendation, short films: LE PANIER A VIANDE by Jacqueline Veuve and Yves Yersin,ANTOINE ET CLEOPATRE by Francis Reusser
- Positif Magazine Award: AI NO KAWARI by Izen Kurahara
- Foreign Critic’s Award: SZEGENYLEGENYEK by Miklos Jancso
