= Annelie =

Annelie is a female given name. Notable people with the name include:

- Annelie Botes (1957–2024), South African writer
- Annelie Ehrhardt (born 1950), German athlete who competed in hurdling
- Annelie Enochson (born 1953), Swedish Christian Democratic politician and architect
- Annelie Johansson (born 1978), Swedish long-distance runner
- Annelie Hastig Olsson (born 1974), Swedish politician
- Annelie Lotriet (born 1960), South African politician, currently MP with the Democratic Alliance and Shadow Minister of Arts and Culture
- Annelie Minny (born 1986), international cricketer for South Africa national women's cricket team
- Annelie Pompe (born 1980), adventurer and athlete from Mölndal, Sweden

== See also ==
- Annelie (film), a 1941 German film directed by Josef von Báky
- Anneli
