= Ernst Jacobi =

German actor (1933–2022)

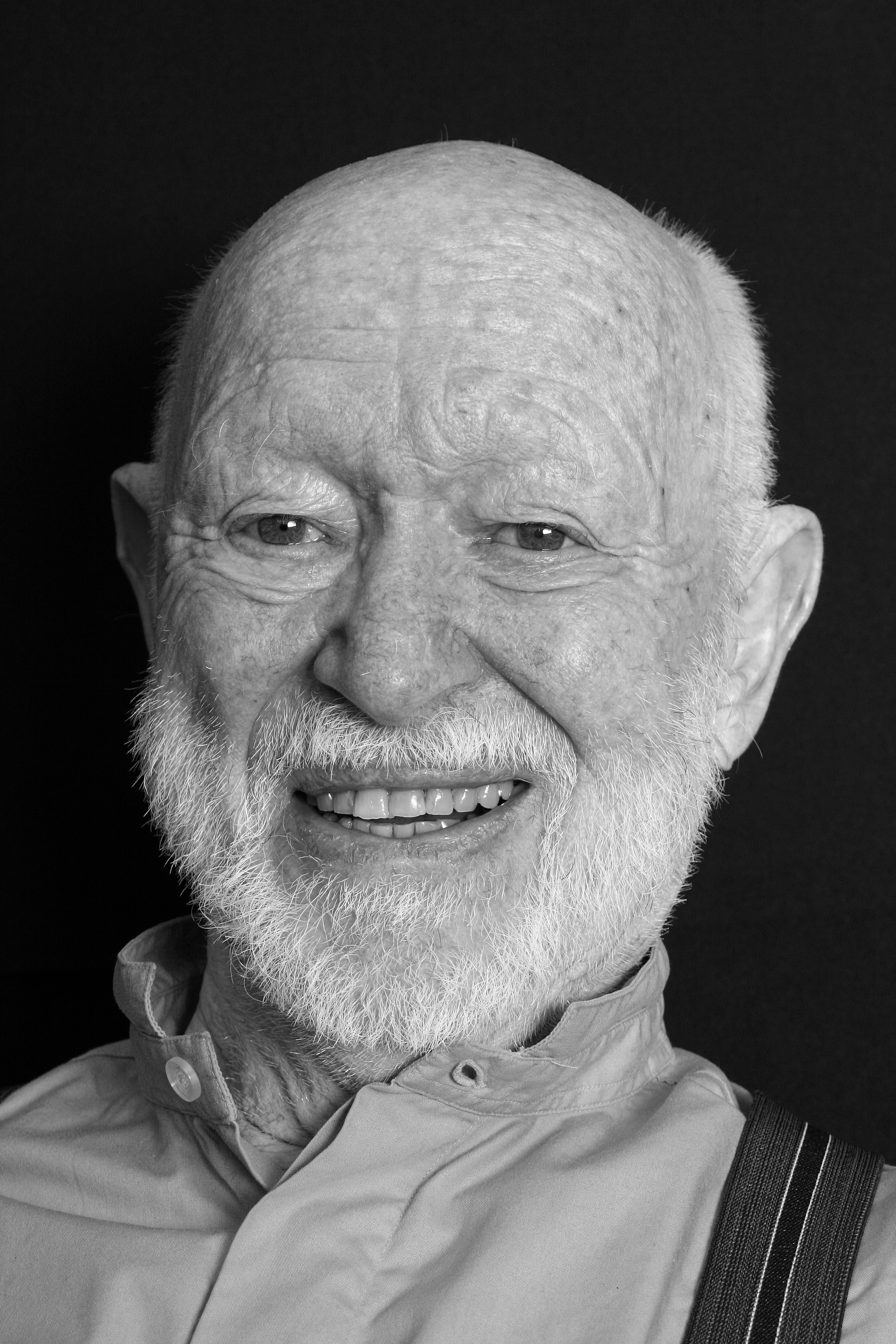
- in 2018
- Born: Ernst Gerhard Ludwig Jacobi-Scherbening; 11 July 1933; Berlin, Germany
- Died: 23 June 2022 (aged 88); Vienna, Austria
- Occupation: Actor
- Years active: 1957–2017

Ernst Gerhard Ludwig Jacobi-Scherbening, professionally called Ernst Jacobi ([ɛʁnst ˈjaːkɔbiː]; 11 July 1933 – 23 June 2022), was a German actor. He was known for serious character roles, especially in the 1979 film The Tin Drum (Die Blechtrommel), as Hans in Germany, Pale Mother (1980), as Adolf Hitler in Hamsun (1996), and as the narrator in The White Ribbon (2009). He appeared in over 200 television productions and worked at the Burgtheater in Vienna from 1977 to 1987, and at the Schauspielhaus Zürich from 1987 to 1992. In 1975 he won the Berliner Kunstpreis for his portrayal of Alexander März in the television film Das Leben des schizophrenen Dichters Alexander März.

== Early life and education ==
Ernst Gerhard Ludwig Jacobi-Scherbening was born in Berlin on 11 July 1933. His father was an academic and his mother worked for the Reichsluftfahrtministerium. His parents divorced shortly after his birth, and he lived with his mother and a step-sister (born 1930). In 1939, his mother moved to Norway, and he lived with his father's sister in a Protestant pastor's household where he was raised rigidly. He was a member of the Jungvolk of the Hitlerjugend. He met his mother and sister only after World War II in Berlin. At age 15, he joined the children's choir of the RIAS. After completing school with the Abitur in 1951, he trained to be an actor at the Max-Reinhardt-Schule Berlin until 1953. In the 1960s, he studied at the Stage d'été sur le mime in Paris and London with Jacques Lecoq.

== Career ==
=== Theatre ===
Jacobi began his theatre career in Berlin, engaged at the Hebbel-Theater from 1951. He moved to the Theater am Kurfürstendamm, the Tribüne and the Schillertheater in Berlin. He then played at the Deutsches Schauspielhaus in Hamburg, and the Münchner Kammerspiele. He worked at the Burgtheater in Vienna from 1977 to 1987, and at the Schauspielhaus Zürich from 1987 to 1992.

=== Film ===
In 1957, Jacobi had a small role in the Hans Quest romantic comedy film The Big Chance (Die große Chance), opposite Walter Giller, Gardy Granass and Michael Cramer. In 1959 he appeared in Gerd Oswald's The Day the Rains Came (Am Tag als der Regen kam), a crime film featuring Mario Adorf, Gert Fröbe and Christian Wolff in the main roles. In 1966 he had a minor role in Ulrich Schamoni 's Es, a film about a real estate agent and an architectural draughtswoman and a concealed pregnancy and abortion. Critically acclaimed, it was selected as West Germany's official submission to the 38th Academy Awards for Best Foreign Language Film, and was entered into the 1966 Cannes Film Festival.

In 1979, Jacobi played the role of Gauleiter Löbsack alongside David Bennent, Mario Adorf and Berta Drews in Volker Schlöndorff's black comedy war drama The Tin Drum (Die Blechtrommel) (1979). The film was lauded by the critics, winning the Palme d'Or at the 1979 Cannes Film Festival, and the Best Foreign Language Film at the 1980 Academy Awards. The following year, Jacobi had a lead role playing Hans opposite Eva Mattes (as Lene) in the Helma Sanders-Brahms-directed drama film Germany Pale Mother, set in Nazi Germany. Critically acclaimed, the film won the Grand Prix at the Créteil International Women's Film Festival and was nominated for the Golden Berlin Bear at the 30th Berlin International Film Festival. In 2014 it was restored by the British Film Institute, who hailed it as a "feminist classic", writing that the "nuanced counterbalancing of Hans' and Lene's war experiences recalls the feminist commitment to exploring the distortion wrought by fascism as much on male as female psyches and bodies" and a "restored sequence charting Lene's sympathetic encounter with Soviet soldiers underlines Sanders-Brahms' political rooting in a West German feminism that was in turn indebted to the post-1968 student left."

In 1995, Jacobi appeared in Leidulv Risan's Pakten, a Norwegian crime comedy which starred Robert Mitchum and Cliff Robertson in the lead roles. The following year, he portrayed Adolf Hitler in another Scandinavian production, Hamsun, a biopic about the Norwegian author Knut Hamsun. The author Charles P. Mitchell wrote in his book about portrayals of the leader in film that Jacobi "makes an excellent first impression in the role, dressed in a simple military uniform".

=== Television and voice work ===
Jacobi played more than 200 roles on television, including crime series such as Derrick and Tatort. He had his last role in Polizeiruf 110 in 2017. In 1965 he appeared in Hans Lietzau's Die Chinesische Mauer (The Great Wall of China), a television film which was produced by Südwestfunk. In 1975, Jacobi was awarded the Berliner Kunstpreis for his portrayal of Alexander März in the television film Das Leben des schizophrenen Dichters Alexander März.

Since the 1950s, Jacobi also worked as a voice actor for film synchronisations and audio books. One of his early assignments was the German voice of Peter Pan in the 1953 Disney film of the same name, later he also voiced Christopher Lloyd as Doc Brown in the Back to the Future films. In 2009 he narrated Michael Haneke's critically acclaimed The White Ribbon (Das weiße Band), a black-and-white drama film which darkly depicts life in a northern German village just before World War I. Jacobi narrates from the perspective of the main character, a teacher at a local school, as an old man many years after the events of the film.

== Personal life ==
Jacobi lived in Munich and spent his last years in seclusion. He died in Vienna on 23 June 2022, at the age of 88.

== Films ==
- The Big Chance (1957), as Tommy Reichmann
- The Day the Rains Came (1959), as Fritz
- Nachruf auf Jürgen Trahnke (1962, TV film), as Jürgen Trahnke
- The Chinese Wall (1965, TV film), as The Mute Son
- Es (1966), as Bookseller
- Count Oederland (1968, TV film), as The Murderer
- Bauern, Bonzen und Bomben (1973, TV miniseries), as Tredup
- The Last Days of Gomorrah (1974, TV film), as Plutonius
- Tadellöser & Wolff (1975, TV film), as The Narrator
- Derrick – Season 2, Episode 6: "Paddenberg" (1975, TV), as Gottfried Ehring
- Das Leben des schizophrenen Dichters Alexander März (1975, TV film), as Alexander März
- The Tin Drum (1979), as Löbsack
- The Murderer (1979), as Frans
- The Great Runaway (1979, TV miniseries), as Mr. Daubmann
- Germany, Pale Mother (1980), as Hans
- Frau Jenny Treibel (1982, TV film), as Professor Willibald Schmidt
- Vom Webstuhl zur Weltmacht (1983, TV miniseries), as Jakob Fugger
- Eine geschlossene Gesellschaft (1987, TV film), as Bernhard Hürfeld
- Success (1991), as Dr. Siegbert Geier
- Pakten (1995), as Leonard Haas
- Roula (1995), as Sievers
- Hamsun (1996), as Adolf Hitler
- The White Ribbon (2009), as the narrator
