= The Day the Rains Came (film) =

1959 film

- Directed by: Gerd Oswald
- Written by: Heinz Oskar Wuttig; Gerd Oswald; Will Berthold
- Produced by: Artur Brauner; Wolf Brauner
- Starring: Mario Adorf; Christian Wolff; Gert Fröbe; Elke Sommer
- Cinematography: Karl Löb
- Edited by: Heinz Haber; Brigitte Fredersdorf
- Music by: Martin Böttcher
- Production company: Alfa Film
- Distributed by: Bavaria Film
- Release date: 24 November 1959
- Running time: 88 minutes
- Country: West Germany
- Language: German

The Day the Rains Came (German: Am Tag als der Regen kam) is a 1959 West German crime film directed by Gerd Oswald and starring Mario Adorf, Christian Wolff, Gert Fröbe and Elke Sommer. It is named after song "Am Tag als der Regen kam" by Dalida, which was a big hit of the year; then it was customary to release a film named after the hit songs of the moment.

The film's sets were designed by the art director Paul Markwitz and Hans Jürgen Kiebach. It was shot at the Bavaria Studios in Munich and on location in West Berlin.

== Cast ==
- Mario Adorf as Werner Maurer
- Christian Wolff as Robert
- Gert Fröbe as Dr. Albert Maurer
- Corny Collins as Inge Zimmermann
- Elke Sommer as Ellen
- Claus Wilcke as Rudi
- Ernst Jacobi as Fritz
- Gert Günther Hoffmann as Willi
- Wolf Richards as Otto
- Uwe Gauditz as Professor
- Horst Naumann as Kriminalassistent Thiel
- Ulla Moritz as Bardame im Splendid
- Harry Hertzsch
- Arno Paulsen as Textilkaufmann Grossmann
- Herbert Weissbach as Rummelplatzpächter Streichan

== Bibliography ==
- Spicer, Andrew. Historical Dictionary of Film Noir. Scarecrow Press, 2010.
