= Shadows of the Past =

Shadows of the Past may refer to:

- Shadows of the Past (album), an album by Sentenced
- Shadows of the Past (1922 film), a German silent film
- Shadows of the Past (1936 film), an Austrian drama film
- Shadows of the Past (1991 film), a Canadian suspense thriller TV film
- Shadows of the Past (telenovela) (La sombra del pasado), a Mexican telenovela
