= The Last Rebel (disambiguation) =

The Last Rebel is a 1993 album by Lynyrd Skynyrd.

The Last Rebel may also refer to:

- The Last Rebel (1918 film)
- The Last Rebel (1958 film), a Mexican western film
- The Last Rebel (1971 film), an American Technicolor Western film
