= The Strange Night =

1967 film

- Film poster
- Directed by: Alfredo Angeli
- Written by: Alfredo Angeli; Marco Guglielmi; Giulio Paradisi; Bruno Rasia
- Produced by: Alvaro Mancori
- Starring: Sandra Milo
- Cinematography: Marcello Gatti
- Edited by: Giulio Paradisi
- Music by: Benedetto Ghiglia
- Release date: 13 April 1967
- Running time: 113 minutes
- Country: Italy
- Language: Italian

The Strange Night (Italian: La notte pazza del conigliaccio) is a 1967 Italian film directed by Alfredo Angeli and stars Sandra Milo in the lead role. It was entered into the 17th Berlin International Film Festival.

== Cast ==
- Sandra Milo as Debora
- Enrico Maria Salerno
- Giulio Platone
- Lidia Alfonsi
- Massimo Serato
- Evi Maltagliati
- Ettore Manni
- Antonella Steni
- Giorgio Capecchi
- Elvira Cortese
- Annie Gorassini
- Adriano Micantoni
- Mirella Pamphili
