= Luise Ullrich =

Austrian actress

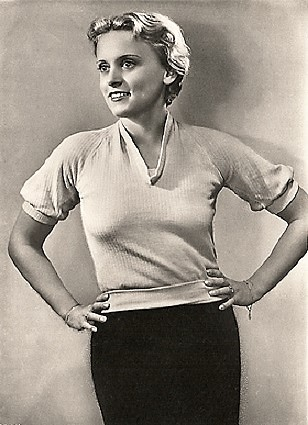
- Luise Ullrich, by Yva
- Born: 31 October 1910; Vienna, Austria-Hungary (now Austria)
- Died: 21 January 1985 (aged 74); Munich, West Germany (now Germany)
- Occupation: Actress
- Years active: 1932–1981

Luise Ullrich (31 October 1910 – 21 January 1985) was an Austrian actress.

== Life ==
She was born in Vienna. While still a teenager, she got a stage contract. In late 1932, Ullrich played opposite Werner Krauss in "Rauhnacht" in Berlin. In 1933, she performed with Hans Jaray in Leise flehen meine Lieder (Lover Divine, in English). During one of her performances, she was spotted by actor and filmmaker Luis Trenker, who cast her in the leading role of Erika in Der Rebell (1932). It launched her film career, as she moved to higher-profile roles. Louis B. Mayer offered her a contract at MGM in 1938, which Louise declined. By 1941, for Annelie, she earned for the film studio Ufa the then record sum of 6.5 million Reichsmark and garnered Ullrich the Coppa Volpi award in Venice. She won the Volpi Cup for Best Actress at the 1941 Venice Film Festival. In South America, she met her future husband, Count Wulf Dietrich zu Castell, director of Munich-Riem airport.

After a string of films, she began appearing on TV in the 1960s. In 1973, she published her memoirs. She spent most of her remaining years writing and painting. She appeared in nearly 50 films between 1932 and 1981. She died of cancer in 1985, aged 74.

== Filmography ==
Year	Title	Role	Notes
1932	The Rebel	Erika Rieder	
1933	Liebelei	Mitzi Schlager	
1933	Homecoming to Happiness	Liesl Pichler	
1933	Gently My Songs Entreat	Emmi Passenter	
1933	Glück im Schloß	Anny	
1934	Between Two Hearts	Ulla Georgius	
1934	The Fugitive from Chicago	Steffie Dux	
1934	Stupid Mama	Heidie Burkhardt	
1935	Regine	Regine	
1935	Suburban Cabaret	Mizzi Ebeseder, seine Braut	
1935	Lessons in Love	Sophie Bruninger	
1935	Victoria	Viktoria	
1936	Shadows of the Past	Betty Gall + Helene Gall	
1937	Don't Promise Me Anything	Monika	
1938	I Love You	Fotografin Eva	
1938	The Day After the Divorce	Bettina Romberg	
1940	Liebesschule	Hanni Weber, Sekretärin	
1941	Annelie	Annelie Dörensen	
1942	The Rainer Case	Prinzessin Henriette von Battenstein	
1944	Nora	Nora Helmer	
1945	Kamerad Hedwig	Hedwig	
1949	Keepers of the Night	Cornelie	
1949	The Trip to Marrakesh	Liliane	
1953	Don't Forget Love	Anna Kienzel	
1954	Regina Amstetten	Regina Amstetten	
1954	A Woman of Today	Toni Bender	
1954	The Great Test	Helma Krauss	
1955	I Know What I'm Living For	Maria Pfluger	
1955	Sarajevo	Herzogin Sophie Hohenberg	
1956	The First Day of Spring	Dolly	
1957	Die liebe Familie	Betty Lang	
1957	All Roads Lead Home	Tilla Haidt	
1958	Ist Mama nicht fabelhaft?	Sabine Meinrad	
1960	Ein Student ging vorbei	Bettina	
1960	Until Money Departs You	Lisbeth Grapsch	
1961	Frau Irene Besser	Irene Besser	
1961	The Shadows Grow Longer	Frau Diethelm	
1972-1973	Eight Hours Don't Make a Day	Oma Krüger	TV series
