= 21st Locarno Film Festival =

Film festival in Locarno, Switzerland

- Location: Locarno, Switzerland
- Founded: 1946
- Awards: Golden Leopard: The Visionaries directed by Maurizio Ponzi
- Artistic director: Freddy Buache; Sandro Bianconi
- Festival date: Opening: 26 September 1968; Closing: 6 October 1968
- Website: Locarno Film Festival

Locarno Film Festival
- 22nd 20th

The 21st Locarno Film Festival was held from 26 September to 6 October 1968 in Locarno, Switzerland.

There was fight on the festival jury this year. Due to the invasion of Czechoslovakia by Warsaw Pact countries, Czech director and jury member Jiri Menzel refused to vote on films from Warsaw Pact countries as he felt he could not fairly evaluate them. As a result, the five person jury voted to ask the distributors of films from the Soviet Union, Hungary and East Germany to remove them from competition at the festival.

However, after the vote, two jury members, Michel Cournot and Alexander J. Seiler, thought this was too extreme and threatened to resign, while jury members Puriša Đorđević and André Delvaux sided with Mezel. The result was the selection of an entirely new jury, pulled from the youth jury, and all films were again considered in the competition.

Also, like at other festivals this year, student protesters briefly interrupted the festival during the last night, but ultimately did not stop the festival for long.

The festival's top prize, the Golden Leopard, was awarded to The Visionaries directed by Maurizio Ponzi.

== Official Sections ==
The following films were screened in these sections:

=== Main Program ===
Main Program / Feature Films In Competition

| Original Title | English Title | Director(s) | Year | Production Country |
|---|---|---|---|---|
| Anichti Epistoli | Open Letter | Georges Stamboulopoulos | 1967 | Greece |
| Cara A Cara | Face to Face | Júlio Bressane | 1967 | Brazil |
| Eine Ehe | A Marriage | H.R. Strobel | 1968 | Germany |
| El Periodista Turner | The Turner Journalist | Oscar Menendez | 1967 | Mexico |
| Eltavozzott Nap/Cati | The Girl | Marta Meszaros | 1968 | Hungary |
| Fantabulous | Fantabulous Inc. | Sergio Spina | 1967 | Italia |
| Grazie Zia | Come Play with Me | Salvatore Samperi | 1968 | Italia |
| Haschisch | Hashish | Michel Soutter | 1968 | Switzerland |
| Head | Dope | Sheldon Rochlin, Diane Rochlin | 1968 | USA |
| I Visionari | The Visionaries | Maurizio Ponzi | 1968 | Italia |
| Il Gatto Selvaggio | The Wild Cat | Andrea Frezza | 1968 | Italia |
| Leben Zu Zweit | Life in Pairs | Hermann Zscoche | 1968 | East Germany |
| Medding El Az Ember | How Long Does Man Live? | Judit Elek | 1967 | Hungary |
| Mokhtar | | Ben Aicha Sadok | 1968 | Tunisia |
| Money-Money | | José Varela | | France |
| No Tears For Ananse | | Sam Aryeetey | 1968 | Ghana |
| Osennie Svadjby | Autumn Weddings | Boris Yashin | 1967 | Russia |
| Revolution | | Jack O'Connel | 1968 | USA |
| Sasayaki No Joe | Whispering Joe | Koichi Saito | 1968 | Japan |
| Soukroma Vichrice | Windstorm | Hynek Bočan | 1967 | Czech Republic |
| Yellow Submarine | | George Dunning | 1968 | Great Britain |
| Tute Cabrero | Eeny, Meeny, Miny, Mo | Juan José Jusid | 1968 | Argentina |
| Viagem Au Fim Do Mundo | Voyage to the End of the World | Fernando Campos | 1968 | Brazil |

Main Program / Short Films In Competition

| Original Title | English Title | Director(s) | Year | Production Country |
|---|---|---|---|---|
| Archeologia | Archeology | Andrzej Brzozowski | | Poland |
| Ares Contre Atlas | Ares Against Atlas | Manuel Otéro | | France |
| Automate | | Christian Liardet | | Switzerland |
| Breakfast | | William Sachs | | Great Britain |
| Dans L'Amphitheatre | In the Amphitheater | Jan Werber | | Israel |
| Das Schlüsselkind | The Key Child | Helmut Pfandler | | Austria |
| Embassas | | Ivan Andonov | | Bulgaria |
| Faithful Departed | | Kieran Hickey | | Iceland |
| Flesh | | Stephen Weeks | | Great Britain |
| God Respects Us When We Work, But Loves Us When We Dance | | Les Blank | | USA |
| Hanno Detto Il Tuo Nome | They Said your Name | Gianni Aringoli, Claudio Sestrieri | | Italia |
| Historia Naturae | History of Nature | Jan Švankmajer | | Czech Republic |
| Hobby | | Daniel Szczechura | | Poland |
| Impressions Living | | Daniel Fahri | | Switzerland |
| Irreversione | | Germano Olivotto, Gaetano Pesce | | Italia |
| Koncertissimo | Concertissimo | Jozsef Gemes | | Hungary |
| Le Retour D'Un Aventurier | The Return of an Adventurer | Mustapha Alassane | | Nigeria |
| Les Corbeaux | The Crows | Gisèle Ansorge, Ernest Ansorge | | Switzerland |
| Les Moghuls | | Aruna Vasudev | | India |
| Madur Of Verksmidja | Madur of Workshop | Thorgeir Thorgeirsson | | Iceland |
| Monsieur Jean-Claude Vaucherin | SONSERY Jean-Claude Vauline | Pascal Aubier | | France |
| Notturno De Göldi | Night De Göldi | Carlos Frederico | | Brazil |
| Now | | Cammell Hudson, Brown John | | Great Britain |
| O Rupama I Cepovima | About Holes and Cepos | Ante Zaninovik | | Yugoslavia |
| Od 3 Do 22 (Zena) | From 3 to 22 (a Woman) | Krešo Golik | | Yugoslavia |
| Ouverture | Opening | | | Hungary |
| Pas De Deux | No Two | Norman McLaren | | Canada |
| Poslije Podne | P.m | Lordan Zafranović | | Yugoslavia |
| Soto | | Ivan Croce | | Venezuela |
| Spindrift | | Oxley Hughan, Geoffrey Scott | | New Zealand |
| Stairs | | Gene Beuth | | USA |
| Tolerancija | Tolerance | Zlato Grgic, Branko Ranitovic | | Yugoslavia |
| Underground New York | | Gideon Bachman | | USA |
| Unete Pueblo | Unete Town | Oscar Menendez | | Mexico |
| Univers | Universe | Manuel Otéro | | France |

=== Out of Competition (Fuori Concorso) ===
Main Program / Feature Films Out of Competition

| Original Title | English Title | Director(s) | Year | Production Country |
|---|---|---|---|---|
| Capitu | Get it | Paulo César Saraceni | 1968 | Brazil |
| Chronik der Anna Magdalena Bach | The Chronicle of Anna Magdalena Bach | Danièle Huillet, Jean-Marie Straub | 1968 | Germany |
| Escalation | Escalation | Roberto Faenza | 1968 | Italia |
| La hora de los hornos | The Hour of the Furnaces | Fernando Solanas | 1968 | Argentina |
| Les Gauloises bleues | Les Gauloises bleues | Michel Cournot | 1968 | France |
| Rozmarné léto | Capricious Summer | Jiri Menzel | 1968 | Czech Republic |
| Un soir, un train | One Night... A Train | André Delvaux | 1968 | Belgium |

Main Program / Short Films Out of Competition

| Original Title | English Title | Director(s) | Year | Production Country |
|---|---|---|---|---|
| Publicitoc | | Jean Daniel Bloesch | | Switzerland |
| The Sailor And The Devil | | Richard Williams | | Great Britain |

=== Special Sections ===
Feature Films Out of Competition
| Original Title | English Title | Director(s) | Year | Production Country |
|---|---|---|---|---|
| La Otra Ciudad | The Other City | Checo Vejar | 1967 | Mexico |
| Les Petits Soldats | Little Soldiers | | | |
| Liebe Und So Weiter | Love and so on | Georges Moorse | 1968 | Germany |
| Monterrey Pop | | Don Alan Pennebaker | 1968 | USA |
| Vali | | Sheldon Rochlin | 1967 | USA |
Short Films Out of Competition
| Fleur Carnivore | Carnivorous Flower | Etats généraux du cinéma | | France |

==== Tribute To Satyajit Ray ====
Tribute To Satyajit Ray
| Original Title | English Title | Director | Year | Production Country |
|---|---|---|---|---|
| Aparajito | Untreated | Satyajit Ray | 1956 | India |
| Apur Sansar | | Satyajit Ray | 1959 | India |
| Charulata | | Satyajit Ray | 1964 | India |
| Devi | | Satyajit Ray | 1960 | India |
| Jalshagar | Jalasagar | Satyajit Ray | 1958 | India |
| Mahanagar | | Satyajit Ray | 1963 | India |
| Paras Pathar | Paras Stone | Satyajit Ray | 1957 | India |
| Pather Panchali | | Satyajit Ray | 1955 | India |
| Rabindranath Tagore | | Satyajit Ray | 1961 | India |
| Teen Kanya | | Satyajit Ray | 1961 | India |

== Official Awards ==
=== Youth Jury ===
- Golden Leopard, feature films: The Visionaries directed by Maurizio Ponzi
- Silver Leopard, jury special award, feature films: HOW LONG DOES MAN LIVE? by Judit Elek
- Silver Leopard for the best first feature, feature films: OSENNIE SVADJBY by Boris Yashin
- Mention, short films: LES CORBEAUX by Gisèle Ansorge and Ernest Ansorge, OD 3 DO 22 (ZENA) by Kreso Golik
- Mention, feature films: YELLOW SUBMARINE by George Dunning
- Golden Leopard, short films: O RUPAMA I CEPOVIMA by Ante Zaninovik
- Silver Leopard for the Best film of the Third World, feature films: VIAGEM AU FIM DO MUNDO by Fernando Campos
