= We Two (1970 film) =

1970 film

- Directed by: Ulrich Schamoni
- Written by: Ulrich Schamoni
- Produced by: Peter Genée
- Starring: Sabine Sinjen; Christoph Bantzer; Corny Collins
- Cinematography: Michael Ballhaus
- Edited by: Heidi Genée
- Music by: Xhol Caravan
- Production company: Terra Film
- Distributed by: Constantin Film
- Release date: 30 January 1970
- Running time: 88 minutes
- Country: West Germany
- Language: German

We Two (German: Wir – zwei) is a 1970 West German drama film directed by Ulrich Schamoni and starring Sabine Sinjen, Christoph Bantzer and Corny Collins. It was shot in West Berlin. The film was made in Eastmancolor with cinematography by Michael Ballhaus.

== Cast ==
- Sabine Sinjen as Hella Meyer
- Christoph Bantzer as Andreas
- Corny Collins as Marlies
- Ulrich Schamoni as Willy Meyer
- Ulrike Schamoni as Ulrike Meyer
- Käte Jaenicke as Käthe
- Herbert Weissbach as Dr. Weisshappel
- Rainer-Christian Mehring as Festredner
- Rolf Eden as R.S. Eden
- Horst Tomayer as Horst Tomayer
- Blandine Ebinger as Mutter Flemming
- Dagmar Kotschenreuther as Blumenverkäuferin
- Peter Schamoni as Pfarrer

== Bibliography ==
- Bock, Hans-Michael & Bergfelder, Tim. The Concise CineGraph. Encyclopedia of German Cinema. Berghahn Books, 2009.
- Hammer, Tad Bentley . International Film Prizes: An Encyclopedia. Garland, 1991.
