= Precocious Youth =

1957 film

- Directed by: Josef von Báky
- Written by: C. Bloehmer (novel); Gerda Corbett; Peter Heim (novel); Heinz Oskar Wuttig
- Produced by: Artur Brauner; Horst Wendlandt
- Starring: Heidi Brühl; Christian Doermer; Christian Wolff; Peter Kraus; Sabine Sinjen
- Cinematography: Karl Löb
- Edited by: Walter Wischniewsky
- Music by: Georg Haentzschel
- Production company: CCC Film
- Distributed by: Europa-Filmverleih
- Release date: 17 October 1957
- Running time: 91 minutes
- Country: West Germany
- Language: German

Precocious Youth (German: Die Frühreifen) is a 1957 West German drama film directed by Josef von Báky and starring Heidi Brühl, Christian Doermer and Christian Wolff.

The film's sets were designed by Emil Hasler and Paul Markwitz.

== Cast ==
- Heidi Brühl as Inge
- Christian Doermer as Wolfgang
- Christian Wolff as Freddy
- Jochen Brockmann as Vikar Englert
- Paul Esser as Herr Messmann
- Richard Häussler as Herr Rau
- Ilse Fürstenberg as Frau Messmann
- Peter Kraus as Guenther
- Sabine Sinjen as Hannelore
- Harald Dietl as Heini
- Harry Wüstenhagen as Abteilungsleiter Hennig
- Jürgen Graf as Butzi
- Cathrin Heyer as Helga
- Claus Peter Lüttgen as Jochen
- Peter Nijinskij as Jonny
- Walter Koch as Kalle
- Adalbert Gausche as Josef Andretzki

== Bibliography ==
- Bock, Hans-Michael & Bergfelder, Tim. The Concise CineGraph. Encyclopedia of German Cinema. Berghahn Books, 2009.
- Hake, Sabine. German National Cinema. Routledge, 2002.
