= Christoph Bantzer =

German television actor

Christoph Bantzer (born 4 January 1936 in Marburg) is a German television actor.

== Life and work ==
Christoph Bantzer born on 4 January 1936 in Marburg in a family of artists (both father and grandfather were painters). His younger brother Claus Bantzer is a musician and composer.

Bantzer studied acting at the Berlin University of the Arts.

His focus is the theater spectacle; he played in many important German-language theaters, such as Schiller Theater, Zürich playhouse or the Burgtheater. From 1972 to 1977 he was a member of Christoph Bantzer Deutsches Schauspielhaus in Hamburg. Since 1985 - the beginning of Jürgen Flimm's directorship - Bantzer belongs to the Thalia Theater in Hamburg.

In addition to his theater engagements, Bantzer works with many films, mainly these are television productions. As speaker, he can be heard on an audio book series and also in dubbed films.

== Selected filmography ==
- The Doctor's Dilemma (1963, TV play), as Louis Dubedat
- Death of a Salesman (1968, TV play), as Biff Loman
- We Two (1970), as Andreas
- The Woman in White (1971, TV miniseries), as Walter Hartright
- Die Dämonen (1977, TV miniseries), as Nikolai Stavrogin
- Heinrich Heine (1978, TV film), as Heinrich Heine
- Mozart (1982, TV miniseries), as Mozart
- Wer zu spät kommt – Das Politbüro erlebt die deutsche Revolution (1990, TV film), as Egon Krenz
- Funny Games (1997), as Fred
