= Sabine Sinjen =

German actress (1942–1995)

- Born: 18 August 1942; Itzehoe, Germany
- Died: 18 May 1995 (aged 52); Berlin, Germany
- Occupation: Actress
- Years active: 1957–1994
- Spouse: Peter Beauvais (1963-1984) (divorced)

Sabine Sinjen (18 August 1942 – 18 May 1995) was a German film actress. She appeared in more than 50 films between 1957 and 1994. Sinjen was married to television director Peter Beauvais from 1963 to 1984.

She appeared as one of 28 women under the banner We've had abortions! (Wir haben abgetrieben!) on the cover page of the West German magazine Stern on 6 June 1971. In that issue, 374 women publicly stated that they had had pregnancies terminated, which at that time was illegal.

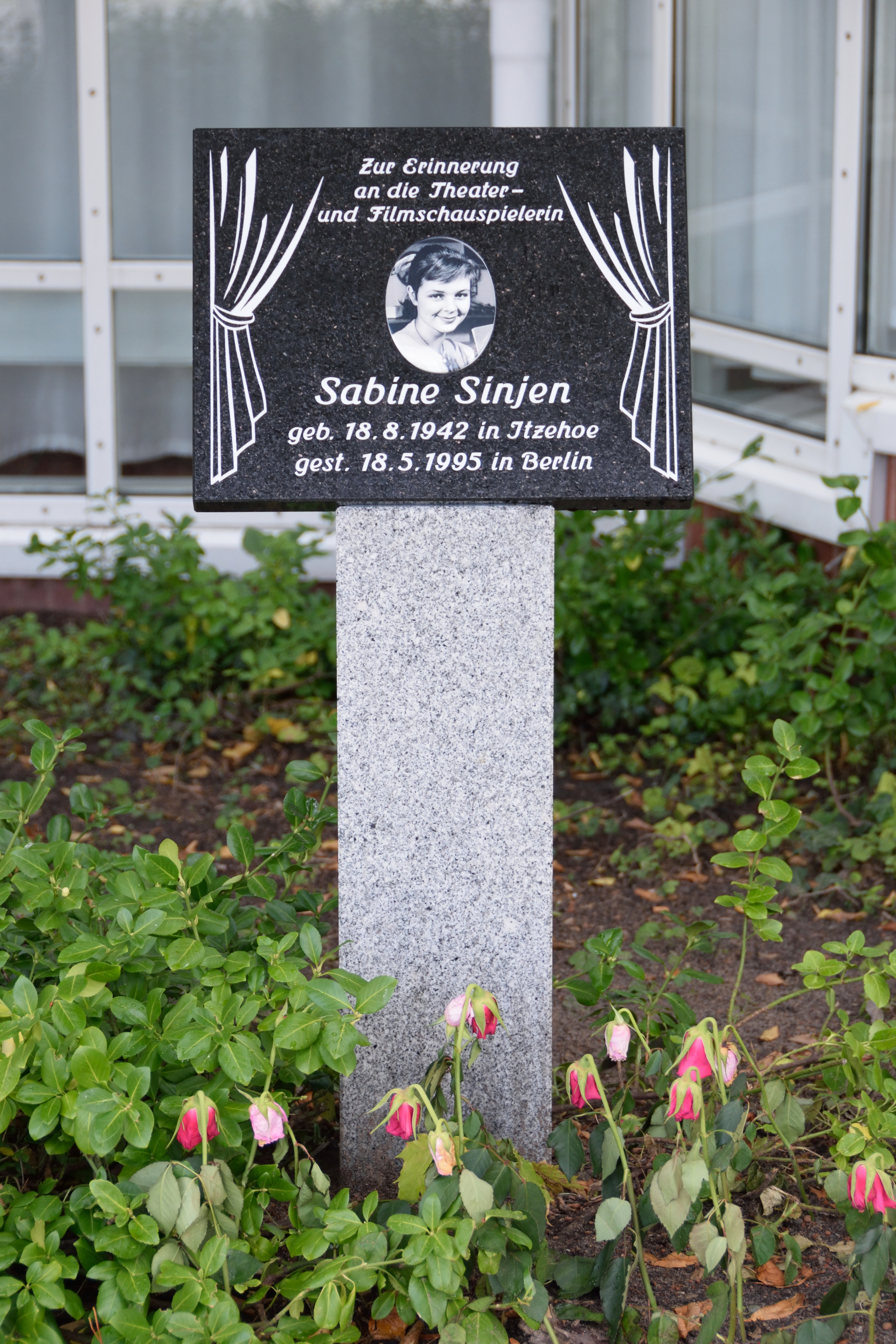
Memorial to Sabine Sinjen at the ItzehoeTheater

== Selected filmography ==
- Precocious Youth (1957), as Hannelore
- Schmutziger Engel (1958), as Ruth
- Mädchen in Uniform (1958), as Ilse von Westhagen
- Stefanie (1958), as Stefanie Gonthar
- Marili (1959), as Marili
- Old Heidelberg (1959), as Käthi
- A Glass of Water (1960), as Abigail
- Stefanie in Rio (1960), as Stefanie Gonthar
- Sabine und die 100 Männer (1960), as Sabine Lorenz
- The Wild Duck (1961, TV film), as Hedvig Ekdal
- Napoleon II, the Eagle (1961), as Archduchess Sophie
- The Vinegar Tree (1961, TV film), as Leone
- Im sechsten Stock (1961), as Thérèse
- The Forester's Daughter (1962), as Christel
- Alle meine Tiere (1962–1963, TV series, 9 episodes), as Bärbel Hofer
- Les Tontons flingueurs (1963), as Patricia
- The Pirates of the Mississippi (1963), as Evelyn
- It (1966), as Hilke
- Next Year, Same Time (1967), as Inge Deitert
- The Rats (1969, TV film), as Pauline
- We Two (1970), Hella Meyer
- Tatort: Kressin und der tote Mann im Fleet (1971, TV series episode), as Ulrike
- Der Kommissar: Grau-roter Morgen (1971, TV series episode), as Sybille Laresser
- Angel in the Pawnshop (1971, TV film), as Lizzie Shaw
- Griseldis (1974, TV film), as Griseldis von Ronach
- Phantasten (1979, TV film), as Julia Sollier
- Boundaries of Time: Caspar David Friedrich (1986), as Caroline Friedrich
