= Karl Weber (art director) =

German art director

- Born: 20 December 1897; Berlin, German Empire
- Died: 1965 (aged 67–68); West Germany
- Occupation: Art director
- Years active: 1929–1965 (film)

Karl Weber (1897-1965) was a German art director. He frequently worked alongside Erich Zander designing film sets.

== Filmography ==
- Napoleon at Saint Helena (1929)
- The Opera Ball (1931)
- Ariane (1931)
- Adventures in the Engadin (1932)
- The Tsar's Diamond (1932)
- Melo (1932)
- The Dreamy Mouth (1932)
- Spies at Work (1933)
- The Old and the Young King (1935)
- Forget Me Not (1935)
- If It Were Not for Music (1935)
- A Night of Change (1935)
- Demon of the Himalayas (1935)
- Martha (1936)
- Intermezzo (1936)
- Three Girls Around Schubert (1936)
- Family Parade (1936)
- The Beggar Student (1936)
- His Best Friend (1937)
- Don't Promise Me Anything (1937)
- To New Shores (1937)
- Two Women (1938)
- Adventure in Love (1938)
- The Great and the Little Love (1938)
- Red Orchids (1938)
- The Day After the Divorce (1938)
- I Love You (1938)
- Yvette (1938)
- A Hopeless Case (1939)
- Wibbel the Tailor (1939)
- Beloved Augustin (1940)
- Nanette (1940)
- Casanova heiratet (1940)
- Our Miss Doctor (1940)
- Der Weg zu Isabel (1940)
- Much Ado About Nixi (1942)
- Melody of a Great City (1943)
- Vienna 1910 (1943)
- Es lebe die Liebe (1944)
- Es fing so harmlos an (1944)
- Leuchtende Schatten (1945)
- Verlobte Leute (1950)
- Miracles Still Happen (1951)
- Homesick for You (1952)
- The Merry Vineyard (1952)
- Southern Nights (1953)
- Hit Parade (1953)
- Clivia (1954)
- Roses from the South (1954)
- Die Försterbuben (1955)
- You Can No Longer Remain Silent (1955)
- The Immenhof Girls (1955)
- Like Once Lili Marleen (1956)
- Junger Mann, der alles kann (1957)
- Doctor Bertram (1957)
- Meine 99 Bräute (1958)
- Du bist wunderbar (1959)
- The Hero of My Dreams (1960)

== Bibliography ==
- Giesen, Rolf. Nazi Propaganda Films: A History and Filmography. McFarland, 2003.
