= Court Martial (1959 film) =

1959 film

- Film poster
- Directed by: Kurt Meisel
- Written by: Will Berthold; Heinz Oskar Wuttig
- Produced by: Gero Wecker
- Starring: Karlheinz Böhm; Christian Wolff; Hans Nielsen
- Cinematography: Georg Krause
- Edited by: Wolfgang Wehrum
- Music by: Werner Eisbrenner
- Production company: Arca-Filmproduktion
- Distributed by: Neue Filmverleih
- Release date: April 1959
- Running time: 84 minutes
- Country: West Germany
- Language: German

Court Martial (German: Kriegsgericht) is a 1959 West German war drama film directed by Kurt Meisel and starring Karlheinz Böhm, Christian Wolff and Hans Nielsen. It was entered into the 1959 Cannes Film Festival. The film's sets were designed by the art director Ernst H. Albrecht.

== Cast ==
- Karlheinz Böhm as Oberleutnant Düren
- Christian Wolff as Fähnrich Stahmer
- Klaus Kammer as Maat Klaus Hinze
- Hans Nielsen as Dr. Wilhelmi, Defense Lawyer
- Charles Régnier as Schorn, Vorsitzender des Kriegsgerichtes (as Charles Regnier)
- Werner Peters as Brenner, Kriegsgerichtsrat
- Carl Wery as Stahmer sen.
- Herbert Tiede as Paulsen, Kapitän zur See
- Raidar Müller-Elmau as Koch, Brenners Adjutant (as Raidar Müller)
- Martin Benrath as Funk-Offizier Maiers
- Reinhard Kolldehoff as Feldwebel
- Berta Drews as Frau Willmers
- Edith Hancke as Frl. Wehner
- Horst Naumann
- Robert Meyn as Admiral Zirler

== Bibliography ==
- Bock, Hans-Michael; Bergfelder, Tim, eds. (2009). The Concise Cinegraph: Encyclopaedia of German Cinema. New York: Berghahn Books. ISBN 978-1-57181-655-9.
