= Rainer Penkert =

German actor

Rainer Penkert (23 June 1921 – 11 April 2012, in Munich) was a German actor.

== Selected filmography ==
- Our Miss Doctor (1940) - Bierlinger, Primaner
- Menschen in Gottes Hand (1948) - Karl Renken
- Anonymous Letters (1949) - Axel Brackmann
- The Cuckoos (1949) - Hanno Gersdorf
- Der fallende Stern (1950) - von Aster
- Heart's Desire (1951) - Richard Sturm
- Toxi (1952) - Robert Peters
- A Heart Plays False (1953) - Dr. Neumeister
- 08/15 (1954) - Leutnant Weldermann
- 08/15 – Part 2 (1955) - Oberleutnant Weldermann
- Urlaub auf Ehrenwort (1955) - Sanitätsgefreiter Hagen
- We're All Necessary (1956)
- Kitty and the Great Big World (1956) - Hopkins
- Embajadores en el infierno (1956) - Obermayer
- Der Etappenhase (1957) - Leutnant Hans Dierkens
- Nature Girl and the Slaver (1957) - Funker
- Stefanie (1958) - Hannes Gonthar
- Wir Wunderkinder (1958) - Cabaret artist (uncredited)
- The Rest Is Silence (1959) - Major Horace
- Kapetan Lesi (1960) - Ahmet Lesi
- The Avenger (1960) - Cinematographer
- Stefanie in Rio (1960) - Hannes Gonthar
- The Revolt of the Slaves (1960) - Massimo
- Beloved Impostor (1961) - Schiffszahlmeister
- The Longest Day (1962) - Leutnant Fritz Theen (uncredited)
- He Can't Stop Doing It (1962) - Lord Gilbert Darroway
- Morituri (1965) - Milkereit
- The Heathens of Kummerow (1967) - Grambauer / Narrator
- Peter und Sabine (1968) - Herr Miller
- Madame and Her Niece (1969) - Jochen Reiter
- Cardillac (1969)
- What Have You Done to Solange? (1972) - Mr. Leach, the headmaster
- Hausfrauen-Report 3.Teil - Alle Jahre wieder-wenn aus blutjungen Mädchen blutjunge Hausfrauen werden (1972) - Dr. Richard Bronner
- Paper Tiger (1975) - Army Colonel
- Es muss nicht immer Kaviar sein (1977, TV miniseries) - Lovejoy
- Das Spinnennetz (1989) - Von Badewitz
