= Annelie (film) =

1941 film

- Directed by: Josef von Báky
- Written by: Thea von Harbou
- Based on: Annelie by Walter Lieck
- Produced by: Eberhard Schmidt
- Starring: Luise Ullrich; Werner Krauss; Käthe Haack
- Cinematography: Werner Krien
- Edited by: Walter Wischniewsky
- Music by: Georg Haentzschel
- Production company: UFA
- Distributed by: UFA
- Release date: 9 September 1941
- Running time: 92 minutes
- Country: Germany
- Language: German

Annelie is a 1941 German historical comedy drama film directed by Josef von Báky and starring Luise Ullrich, Werner Krauss and Käthe Haack. It was shot at the Babelsberg and Tempelhof Studios in Berlin and on location around Königsberg in East Prussia. The film's sets were designed by the art director Emil Hasler. It was based on a play of the same title by Walter Lieck. It was screened at the 1941 Venice Film Festival.

== Cast ==
- Luise Ullrich as Annelie Dörensen
- Werner Krauss as Katasteramtsrat Reinhold Dörensen
- Käthe Haack as Seine Frau
- Karl Ludwig Diehl as Dr. Martin Laborious
- Albert Hehn as Reinhold Laborious, Sohn
- John Pauls-Harding as Gerhard Laborious - Sohn
- Axel von Ambesser as Georg
- Johannes Schütz as Rudi Laborious, Sohn
- Eduard von Winterstein as Sanitätsrat Heberlein
- Josefine Dora as Hebamme
- Ilse Fürstenberg as Hausmädchen Ida
- Claude Farell as Ballettschülerin Helene
- Ursula Herking as Kellnerin bei Ballveranstaltung
- Agnes Windeck as Schwester Martha

== Bibliography ==
- Bock, Hans-Michael & Bergfelder, Tim. The Concise CineGraph. Encyclopedia of German Cinema. Berghahn Books, 2009.
- Giesen, Rolf. Nazi Propaganda Films: A History and Filmography. McFarland, 2003.
- Goble, Alan. The Complete Index to Literary Sources in Film. Walter de Gruyter, 1999.
- Klaus, Ulrich J. Deutsche Tonfilme: Jahrgang 1941. Klaus-Archiv, 2006.
