= The Great Test =

1954 film directed by Rudolf Jugert

- Directed by: Rudolf Jugert
- Written by: Gerda Corbett; Margarete Hohoff
- Produced by: Fritz Anton; Luggi Waldleitner
- Starring: Luise Ullrich; Hans Söhnker; Karin Dor
- Cinematography: Werner Krien
- Music by: Friedrich Meyer
- Production company: Roxy Film
- Distributed by: Constantin Film
- Release date: 20 December 1954
- Running time: 92 minutes
- Country: West Germany
- Language: German

The Great Test (German: Ihre große Prüfung) is a 1954 West German drama film directed by Rudolf Jugert and starring Luise Ullrich, Hans Söhnker and Karin Dor. It was shot at the Spandau Studios in West Berlin and on location around the city. The film's sets were designed by the art director Gabriel Pellon.

== Synopsis ==
A female teacher with modern methods take over a rebellious school class. In time she finds romance with the father of one of the students.

== Cast ==
- Luise Ullrich as Helma Krauss
- Hans Söhnker as Dr. Clausen
- Karin Dor as Elena Clausen
- Hans Leibelt as Direktor
- Ernst Schröder as Dr. Rottach
- Ingeborg Morawski as Fräulein Hellgiebel
- Ernst Waldow as Prof. Renard
- Werner Stock as Dietz
- Irina Garden as Turnlehrerin
- Alfred Balthoff as Ministerialrat
- Willi Rose as Pedell
- Arno Paulsen as Stadtrat Ermer
- Hilde von Stolz as Frau Ermer
- Paul Bösiger as Martin Bruck
- Michael Chevalier as Andreas Lang
- Horst Köppen as Fred Bleyer
- Wolfgang Völz as Mops Möller
- Claus Jurichs as Hans Andringer
- Götz George as Peter Behrend
- Maria Sebaldt as Lotte Ermer
- Nina von Porembsky as Otti Ermer
- Susanne Jany as Liese Beer
- Sonia Sorel as Klassenprimus
- Ewald Wenck as Gemüsehändler
- Eva Bubat
- Erich Dunskus
- Stanislav Ledinek
- Erna Sellmer
- Egon Vogel

== Bibliography ==
- Bock, Hans-Michael; Bergfelder, Tim, eds. (2009). The Concise Cinegraph: Encyclopaedia of German Cinema. New York: Berghahn Books. ISBN 978-1-57181-655-9.
