= Heinrich Jonen =

German film producer (1901–1960)

Bruno Duday
- Born: 15 June 1901; Cologne, German Empire
- Died: 1 December 1960 (aged 59); Neuhaus, Bavaria, West Germany
- Occupation: Producer
- Years active: 1934-1960 (film)

Heinrich Jonen (1901–1960) was a German film producer. Jonen controlled his own company Meteor Film, but did much of his work for large studios. During the Nazi era he headed production at Tobis Film and Berlin Film. In the late 1950s he was placed in charge of production at the re-founded UFA company.

== Selected filmography ==
- Don't Promise Me Anything (1937)
- I Love You (1938)
- Yvette (1938)
- Renate in the Quartet (1939)
- We Danced Around the World (1939)
- Trenck the Pandur (1940)
- Bismarck (1940)
- The Star of Rio (1940)
- Her Other Self (1941)
- Melody of a Great City (1943)
- Wedding Night in Paradise (1950)
- When a Woman Loves (1950)
- A Heidelberg Romance (1951)
- Desires (1952)
- Fritz and Friederike (1952)
- Captain Bay-Bay (1953)
- Jonny Saves Nebrador (1953)
- I Was an Ugly Girl (1955)
- Stresemann (1957)
- Stefanie (1958)
- Stefanie in Rio (1960)

== Bibliography ==
- Giesen, Rolf. Nazi Propaganda Films: A History and Filmography. McFarland, 2003.
