= The Blonde from Peking =

- Directed by: Nicolas Gessner
- Written by: Nicolas Gessner; Richard Brehm
- Starring: Mireille Darc; Giorgia Moll
- Cinematography: Yves Mirkine
- Music by: François de Roubaix
- Release date: 1967
- Language: French

The Blonde from Peking (French: La Blonde de Pékin, Italian: La bionda di Pechino, German: Die Blonde von Peking, also known as Peking Blonde) is a 1967 French-Italian-German adventure film written and directed by Nicolas Gessner. It is loosely based on the 1966 novel You Have Yourself a Deal by James Hadley Chase.

== Plot ==
An amnesic young woman is found fainted on a bench. A tattoo identifies her as Erica Olsen, ex-companion of a Chinese scientist who holds atomic secrets.

== Cast ==
- Mireille Darc as Erika Olsen / Christine Olsen
- Claudio Brook as Garland / Gandler
- Giorgia Moll as Jinny / Nurse Peggy
- Edward G. Robinson as Douglas
- Pascale Roberts as Monica Davis
- Carl Studer as Captain Hardy
- Jean-Jacques Delbo as Olsen
- Valéry Inkijinoff as Fang O Kung
- Yves Elliot as Jackson
- Tony Young as Yen Hay Sun
- Guido Celano as De Luca
- Joe Warfield as Doctor
- Philippe March as Bijoutier
- Françoise Brion as Erika Olsen #2
- Hellmut Lange as Malik
- Werner Schwier as Smernoff
