= Pakten =

1995 Norwegian film

- Release date: 1995
- Country: Norway
- Language: Norwegian

Pakten (English title: Waiting for Sunset (USA) or The Sunset Boys) is a 1995 Norwegian film directed by Leidulv Risan.

It made headlines in Norway as it was the first Norwegian film to star several respected Hollywood stars, namely veteran actors Robert Mitchum (whose mother was Norwegian), and Cliff Robertson. It also boasted some of the biggest acting names from Sweden (Erland Josephson), Germany (Hanna Schygulla and Ernst Jacobi), Austria (Nadja Tiller) and Norway.

It was directed and co-written by Leidulv Risan and shot on location in Oslo (Norway) and the German cities of Cologne and Heidelberg.

Its budget of 5,000,000 USD was above average for a Norwegian movie at the time.

The movie received mainly fair reviews although many seemed to agree that the Nazi-subplot was too melodramatic and got in the way of its feel-good nature.

== Plot ==
Aging Norwegian doctor Carl (Espen Skjønberg) collapses in an Oslo street, and awakens in the hospital. To his great surprise he finds himself surrounded by his old buddies Ernest (Mitchum), Ted (Robertson) and August (Josephson). Taking matters into their own hands, they "kidnap" the dying Carl and embark on an emotional journey back to Heidelberg, where they met studying medicine before World War II. Their plan is to fulfill Carl's final wish but they soon find their cheerful trip overshadowed as they reveal a plot dating back to the pre-war Nazi era.

== Cast ==
- Robert Mitchum as Ernest Bogan
- Cliff Robertson as Ted Roth
- Erland Josephson as August Lind
- Espen Skjønberg as Carl Berner
- Hanna Schygulla as Eva Loehwe
- Nadja Tiller as Gertrude Boman
- Trine Pallesen as Nina
- Bodil Kjer as Marianne Haas
- Ingrid van Bergen as Wenche Haas
- Ernst Jacobi as Leonard Haas
- Ulrich Wildgruber as Reverend Berger
- Kai Wiesinger as Fritz Becker
- Joachim Kemmer as Johannes Christof
- Ellen Horn as Nurse
- Oliver Nägele as Paul Zeppelin
- Sven Nordin as Dr. Sunde
- Armin Rohde
