= The Cuckoos (1949 film) =

1949 film directed by Hans Deppe

- Directed by: Hans Deppe
- Written by: Marta Moyland; Robert A. Stemmle
- Starring: Ina Halley; Rainer Penkert; Carsta Löck
- Cinematography: Robert Baberske; Walter Roßkopf
- Edited by: Lisa Thiemann
- Music by: Ernst Roters
- Production company: DEFA
- Distributed by: Progress Film (East Germany)
- Release date: 8 April 1949
- Running time: 93 minutes
- Country: Germany
- Language: German

The Cuckoos (German: Die Kuckucks) is a 1949 German comedy drama film directed by Hans Deppe and starring Ina Halley, Rainer Penkert and Carsta Löck. It was shot at the Babelsberg Studios in East Berlin. The film was made in the Soviet Zone, in what would soon become East Germany. The film's sets were designed by the art director Wilhelm Vorwerg.

== Cast ==
- Ina Halley as Inge Kuckert
- Rainer Penkert as Hanno Gersdorf
- Günther Güssefeldt as Heinz Krüger
- Aribert Wäscher as Eberhard Schultz
- Carsta Löck as Wanda Merian - Kunstgewerblerin
- Hans Neie as Rolf Kuckert
- Gertrud Wolle as Frau Poehler - die Wirtin
- Marlise Ludwig as Frau Bissig
- Heinz Schröder as Max Kuckert
- Nils-Peter Mahlau as Manfred Kuckert - Genannt Moritz
- Regine Fischer as Evchen Kuckert
- Thomas Dunskus as Erwin - Maurerlehrling
- Knut Hartwig as Meister Miericke
- Günther Klapp as Klaus - Tischlerlehrling
- Michael Klein-Chevalier as Heini - Klemplerlehrling
- Klaus Deppe as Ferdinand - Schlosserlehrling
- Horst Günter Fiegler as Egon - Radiomechanikerlehrling
- Elly Burgmer as Jugendfürsorgerin
- Liselotte Lieck as Dame in der Leihbibliothek
- Erich Dunskus as Maurer
- Karl Hannemann as Wirt der 'Goldenen Traube'
- Albert Johannes as Leiter der Jugendfürsorge
- Otto Matthies as Oberkellner
- Hans Joachim Schölermann as Schimkat
- Walter Strasen as Polizist
- Maria Grünfeld as Frau Nobel
- Hilde Sonntag as Frau Pinselig
- Isolde Laugs as Frau Zottel
- Eleonore Tappert as Frau Dickbein
- Johannes Bergfeldt as Herr Hahn
- Nora Boltenhagen as Stenotypistin
- Käthe Jöken-König as Krügers Wirtin
- Fritz Bohnstedt as Maurer
- Maria Hofen
- Hans Deppe
- Herbert Weissbach
- Willi Wietfeldt
- Georg Helge
- Ingrid Pankow
- Gerda Müller
- Siegfried Andrich
- Meta Rodrich

== Bibliography ==
- Karl, Lars & Skopal, Pavel. Cinema in Service of the State: Perspectives on Film Culture in the GDR and Czechoslovakia, 1945–1960. Berghahn Books, 2015.
- Pinkert, Anke. Film and Memory in East Germany. Indiana University Press, 2008.
