= Werner Schwier =

German actor (1921–1982)

Werner Schwier (born 28 May 1921 in Stadthagen; died 3 May 1982 in Munich) was a German actor, voice actor, and television presenter.

== Career ==
Werner Schwier made a name for himself in silent films on German television. On 14 May 1961 to September 1965, he presented 65 episodes of Hessischer Rundfunk and produced the series Es darf gelacht werden (It is permitted to laugh). The show was a 45 minutes long evening program of the ARD. During the broadcast, three complete short films would be shown. He also had two silent film stars on the show as guests, Buster Keaton in 1962 and Harold Lloyd in 1963.

In the manner of a small film show of the times of the silent films, Schwier presented in a checkered suit, assisted by Konrad Elfers on the Piano and Géza Janós on violin. Before each short film, he would say "I present now, the symbol---assuming the operator approves.", this was followed by a flying bowler hat on screen, to mark the start of the show.

Silent films played only a role on Schwier's afternoon show, which showed only the funny material of the era of silent films. He obtained, with the show, viewers ratings over 80 percent. Schwier added presentation with appropriate dry-humour to the shows, that was not as chaotic as his English counterpart Bob Monkhouse in 1966 with Mad Movies or the later Vater der Klamotte with the corny jokes of Hanns Dieter Hüsch.

After the decline of silent films, Schwier also worked as a supporting actor in films, such as Es (1966), Mädchen, Mädchen (1967), 24 Hour Lover (1968) or Beware of Schwarzenbeck (1979). He was also a guest on the programme Kennen Sie Kino? mit Hellmut Lange.

== Filmography ==
Year	Title	Role	Notes
1957	Charlie Chaplins Lachparade	Himself - Host	
1965	Diamonds Are Brittle	Dr. Worms	
1966	Es	Angler	
1967	Mädchen, Mädchen		
1967	Wilder Reiter GmbH	Partyguest	Uncredited
1967	Next Year, Same Time	Werner	
1967	The Blonde from Peking	Smernoff	
1968	Jet Generation	Hotel portier	
1968	24 Hour Lover	Doctor	
1969	April - April	Smily	
1970	Heureux qui comme Ulysse...	Automobilistes	
1970	Der gelbe Koffer	Lucas	
1974	Con la música a otra parte	Lucas	
1975	Mein Onkel Theodor oder Wie man viel Geld im Schlaf verdient	Landrat	
1979	Beware of Schwarzenbeck	Ramirez	

== Websites ==
- Werner Schwier at IMDb
- Es darf gelacht werden at IMDb
- Quellen zur Filmgeschichte, Book 47 (21. November 1968 - 2. Januar 1969)
- Werner Schwier on Synchrondatenbank.de
- History for Sale - Buster Keaton und Werner Schwier auf einem Autogrammfoto
