= Käte Jaenicke =

German actress (1923–2002)

- Käte Jaenicke headshot
- Born: 2 March 1923; Free City of Danzig
- Died: 1 November 2002 (aged 79); Munich, Germany
- Occupation: Actress
- Years active: 1954-1975

Käte Jaenicke (22 March 1923 – 1 November 2002) was a German theater and film actress. She appeared in more than ninety films from 1954 to 1975.

== Personal life ==
She was in a relationship with writer Aras Ören, and had a daughter Anja Jaenicke (born 9 October 1963 in Berlin) who became an actress. Kate Jaenicke spent her twilight years in a Munich nursing home and died there on 1 November 2002 at 79 years of age. Her final resting place is in the Munich East Cemetery.

== Filmography ==
Year	Title	Role	Notes
1959	Peter schiesst den Vogel ab		Uncredited
1959	The Blue Sea and You		
1959	Marili	Köchin	
1960	The Last Pedestrian		
1960	Willy the Private Detective		
1961	Our House in Cameroon	Elli Dörfler	
1962	Escape from East Berlin	Rosa	
1962–1963	Alle meine Tiere	Lenchen	TV series
1970	Hotel by the Hour	Mrs. Jennewein	
1970	We Two	Käthe	
1970	That Can't Shake Our Willi!	Mizzi Buntje	
1975	By Hook or by Crook		
1978	Holocaust	Mrs. Lowy	TV miniseries
1979	The Tin Drum	Mother Truczinski	
1985	Abschied in Berlin	Grandmother	TV film
1985	Angry Harvest	Anna	
1989	Gummibärchen küßt man nicht	Gundula	
