= Stefanie in Rio =

1960 film

- Directed by: Curtis Bernhardt
- Written by: Emil Burri; Gitta von Cetto; Johanna Sibelius; Eberhard Keindorff
- Produced by: Artur Brauner; Heinrich Jonen
- Starring: Carlos Thompson; Sabine Sinjen; Andréa Parisy
- Cinematography: Klaus von Rautenfeld
- Edited by: Carl Otto Bartning
- Music by: Norbert Schultze
- Production companies: CCC Film; UFA
- Distributed by: UFA
- Release date: 20 September 1960
- Running time: 89 minutes
- Country: West Germany
- Language: German

Stefanie in Rio is a 1960 West German romantic comedy film directed by Curtis Bernhardt and starring Carlos Thompson, Sabine Sinjen and Andréa Parisy. It is a sequel to the 1958 film Stefanie. It was shot at the Spandau and Tempelhof Studios and on location in Rio de Janeiro. The film's sets were designed by the art director Wolf Englert and Ernst Richter.

== Cast ==
- Carlos Thompson as Pablo Guala
- Sabine Sinjen as Stefanie 'Steffie' Gonthar
- Andréa Parisy as Isabella Sampaio
- Françoise Rosay as Mutter Leonora Guala
- Peter Vogel as Andreas 'Andi' Gonthar
- Geronimo Meynier as Diego
- Rainer Penkert as Hannes Gonthar
- Carl Wery as Pfarrer Don Nicolo
- Herbert Weissbach as Zimmerkellner
- Ewald Wenck as Taxler

== Bibliography ==
- Bock, Hans-Michael & Bergfelder, Tim. The Concise CineGraph. Encyclopedia of German Cinema. Berghahn Books, 2009.
