= The Two of Us (1967 film) =

- Directed by: Claude Berri
- Written by: Claude Berri; Gérard Brach; Michel Rivelin
- Produced by: Paul Cadéac; André Hunebelle
- Starring: Michel Simon; Charles Denner
- Cinematography: Jean Penzer
- Edited by: Denise Charvein; Sophie Coussein
- Music by: Georges Delerue
- Distributed by: Valoria
- Release date: June 1967
- Running time: 87 minutes
- Country: France
- Language: French

The Two of Us (French: Le vieil homme et l'enfant) is a 1967 French comedy-drama film. It starred Michel Simon, Charles Denner and Alain Cohen, and was the first film Claude Berri directed. The film was entered into the 17th Berlin International Film Festival, where Michel Simon won the Silver Bear for Best Actor award.

== Plot ==
Claude (Alain Cohen) is an 8-year-old Jewish boy living in France during the Nazi occupation. To reduce the chance that he would be sent to Auschwitz or a similar fate, his parents send him to live with a farm family, the elderly parents of Catholic friends of his parents. (In reality, many French urban Jews made similar choices for their children.) The elderly couple honestly think that the boy has been sent to live with them because Paris is dangerous; it never crosses their mind that Claude is a Jew.

Claude is given a new last name (Longuet), is taught a few things about Catholic ritual, such as the Lord's Prayer, and most important, is told to never let anyone see his circumcised penis (in France, generally only Jews and Muslims are circumcised); thus Claude's strange prudishness at bath time. Otherwise, he plays well the part of boy grateful to be safe in the countryside, building a warm relationship with Pépé (played by veteran character actor Michel Simon) and Mémé (Luce Fabiole), his simple and likeable surrogate grandparents. They form a strong and mutually affectionate bond.

There is a fly in the ointment; Claude's willing protectors share in the prejudices common to their time and place, anti-Semitism included. They believe World War II to be the fault of Jews, communists, Freemasons, and worst of all, the British who can never be trusted. Pépé considers Marshal Philippe Pétain, the puppet leader ruling France under Germany's thumb, a hero. Pépé attempts to pass his anti-Semitic convictions on to the boy. The boy plays along with the old man, teasing him about his prejudices but never revealing the truth about himself.

The film is based on Berri's own experience during the war.

== Cast ==
- Michel Simon - Pépé
- Alain Cohen - Claude
- Charles Denner - Claude's Father
- Luce Fabiole - Mémé
- Roger Carel - Victor
- Paul Préboist - Maxime
- Jacqueline Rouillard - Teacher
- Aline Bertrand - Raymonde
- Sylvine Delannoy - Suzanne

== Home media ==
A DVD (region 1) was released in 2007.
