= 9th Venice International Film Festival (void) =

Italian film festival in 1941

"9th" (void) Venice International Film Festival
- Location: Venice, Italy
- Founded: 1932
- Festival date: 30 August – 14 September 1941
- Website: Website

The "9th" annual (void) Venice International Film Festival was held from 30 August to 14 September 1941. Together with the 1940 and 1942 it is 'considered void- as if they did not happen', as the events were carried out in places far away from the Lido, and very few countries participated due to World War II, with an absolute monopoly of institutions and directors that were members of the fascist Rome-Berlin axis. Additionally, a strong fascist political meddling from the Italian fascist government under Benito Mussolini had led to Italy experiencing a period of cultural depression oppressed by fascist propaganda.

== Jury ==
- Giuseppe Volpi di Misurata (Presidente), Italy
- Olaf Andersson (Sweden)
- László (IV) Balogh (Hungary)
- Dahl (Finland)
- Derichsweiler (Bohemia)
- Jeager (Norway)
- Eitel Monaco (Italy)
- Naef (Switzerland)
- Mihai Puscariu (Romania)
- Soriano (Spain)
- Jan Van der Hayden (Belgium)
- Van der Vegte (Netherlands)
- Wilhelm (Danmark)

== In Competition ==
English title	Original title	Director(s)	Production country
Honeysuckle	Madreselva	Luis César Amadori	Argentina
Closed Door	Puerta cerrada	John Alton, Luis Saslavsky	Argentina
—N/a	Lettre de Anverse (short film)	Jan Vanderheyden	Belgium
Nocturnal Butterfly	Noční motýl	František Čáp	Czechoslovakia
Flames	Lángok	László Kalmár	Hungary

== Awards ==
The following awards were given at the festival:

- Coppa della Biennale
  - Zavaros éjszaka (1940)
- Coppa Mussolini per il miglior film straniero
  - Ohm Krüger (1941)
- Coppa Mussolini per il miglior film italiano
  - La corona di ferro (1941)
- Coppa della Biennale
  - I mariti - Tempesta d'amore (1941)
- Coppa della Biennale
  - Marianela (1940)
- Coppa della Biennale
  - Die mißbrauchten Liebesbriefe (1940)
- Coppa Volpi per la migliore interpretazione femminile
  - Luise Ullrich (Annelie) (1941)
- Coppa Volpi per la migliore interpretazione maschile
  - Ermete Zacconi (Don Buonaparte) (1941)
- Medaglia d'oro della Biennale per la migliore regia
  - Georg Wilhelm Pabst (Komödianten) (1941)
- Medaglia d'oro
  - I Pini di Roma
- Targa di segnalazione
  - Nocturnal Butterfly (1941)
- Targa di segnalazione
  - Bastard (1940)
