= 17th Berlin International Film Festival =

1967 film festival in West Berlin, Germany

- Location: West Berlin, Germany
- Founded: 1951
- Awards: Golden Bear: Le Départ
- Festival date: 23 June – 4 July 1967
- Website: Website

Berlin International Film Festival chronology
- 18th 16th

The 17th annual Berlin International Film Festival was held from 23 June to 4 July 1967.

The Golden Bear was awarded to Le Départ directed by Jerzy Skolimowski.

== Jury ==
The following people were announced as being on the jury for the festival:

- Thorold Dickinson, British filmmaker and producer - Jury President
- Rüdiger von Hirschberg, West-German producer
- Knud Leif Thomsen, Danish filmmaker
- Michel Aubriant, French journalist and writer
- Sashadhar Mukerjee, Indian producer
- Aleksandar Petrović, Yugoslavian filmmaker
- Willard Van Dyke, American filmmaker and photographer
- Manfred Delling, West-German journalist and writer

== Official Sections ==
=== Main Competition ===
The following films were in competition for the Golden Bear award:

English Title	Original Title	Director(s)	Production Country
The ABC of Love	El ABC del amor	Rodolfo Kuhn, Eduardo Coutinho and Helvio Soto	Argentina, Brazil, Chile
A Gangstergirl	Het gangstermeisje	Frans Weisz	Netherlands
The Collector	La Collectionneuse	Éric Rohmer	France
Le Départ		Jerzy Skolimowski	Belgium
The Dream	Сан	Mladomir Puriša Đorđević	Yugoslavia
Fleá Ceoil		Louis Marcus	Ireland
Here's Your Life	Här har du ditt liv	Jan Troell	Sweden
Life's Just Great	Livet är stenkul	Jan Halldoff	Sweden
Liv		Pål Løkkeberg	Norway
Lost Spring	惜春	Noboru Nakamura	Japan
Next Year, Same Time	Alle Jahre wieder	Ulrich Schamoni	West Germany
Paranoia		Adriaan Ditvoorst	Netherlands
The Rats Woke Up	Buđenje pacova	Živojin Pavlović	Yugoslavia
The Seventh Floor	Il fischio al naso	Ugo Tognazzi	Italy
The Strange Night	La notte pazza del conigliaccio	Alfredo Angeli	Italy
Story of Barbara	Historien om Barbara	Palle Kjærulff-Schmidt	Denmark
Tattoo	Tätowierung	Johannes Schaaf	West Germany
Through the Eyes of a Painter		M. F. Husain	India
The Two of Us	Le vieil homme et l'enfant	Claude Berri	France
Vortex, the Face of Medusa	Το πρόσωπο της Μέδουσας	Nikos Koundouros	Greece, United Kingdom
The Wall	Le mur	Serge Roullet	France
The Whisperers		Bryan Forbes	United Kingdom

== Official Awards ==
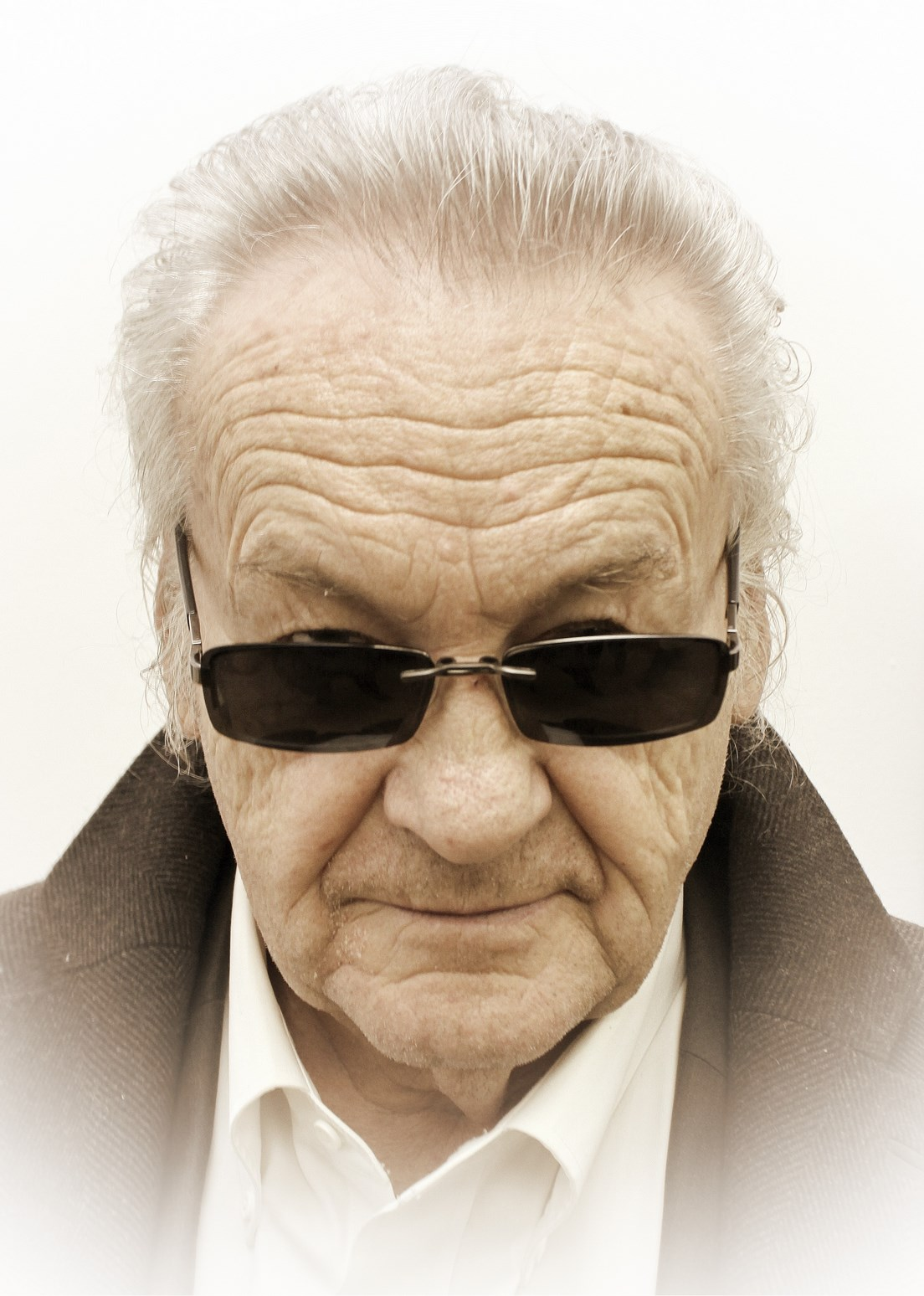
Jerzy Skolimowski, winner of the Golden Bear at the event

The following prizes were awarded by the Jury:

- Golden Bear: Le Départ by Jerzy Skolimowski
- Silver Bear for Best Director: Živojin Pavlović for The Rats Woke Up
- Silver Bear for Best Actress: Edith Evans for The Whisperers
- Silver Bear for Best Actor: Michel Simon for The Two of Us
- Silver Bear Extraordinary Jury Prize:
  - Michael Lentz for Next Year, Same Time
  - Éric Rohmer for La Collectionneuse

== Independent Awards ==
=== Youth Film Award ===
- Best Feature Film Suitable for Young People: La Collectionneuse by Éric Rohmer

=== FIPRESCI Award ===
- Next Year, Same Time by Ulrich Schamoni

=== Interfilm Award ===
- Here's Your Life by Jan Troell
- The Two of Us by Claude Berri
  - Honorable Mention: The Whisperers by Bryan Forbes

=== OCIC Award ===
- The Whisperers by Bryan Forbes

=== C.I.C.A.E. Award ===
- Here's Your Life by Jan Troell

=== C.I.D.A.L.C. Award ===
- Here's Your Life by Jan Troell

=== C.I.D.A.L.C. Gandhi Award ===
- The Two of Us by Claude Berri

=== UNICRIT Award ===
- Le départ by Jerzy Skolimowski
