= I Love You (1938 film) =

1938 film

- Directed by: Herbert Selpin
- Written by: Roman Niewiarowicz (play); Karl Bachmann; Herbert Selpin; Viktor de Kowa; Felix von Eckardt
- Produced by: Heinrich Jonen
- Starring: Viktor de Kowa; Luise Ullrich; Olga Limburg
- Cinematography: Friedl Behn-Grund
- Edited by: Lena Neumann
- Music by: Werner Bochmann
- Production company: Meteor Film
- Distributed by: Tobis Film
- Release date: 22 July 1938
- Running time: 84 minutes
- Country: Germany
- Language: German

I Love You (German: Ich liebe dich) is a 1938 German romantic comedy film directed by Herbert Selpin and starring Viktor de Kowa, Luise Ullrich and Olga Limburg. It was shot at the Johannisthal Studios in Berlin. The film's sets were designed by the art directors Karl Weber and Erich Zander. It is in the style of a screwball comedy, inspired by the story of Adam and Eve.

== Cast ==
- Viktor de Kowa as Amerikaner Percy
- Luise Ullrich as Fotografin Eva
- Olga Limburg as Evas Tante
- Joachim Rake as Percys Freund Max
- Herbert Weissbach as Percys Freund Günther
- Arthur Reinhardt as Vagabund spielender Freund
- Helmut Heyne as Vagabund spielender Freund
- Lothar Devaal as Vagabund spielender Freund
- Max Harry Ernst as Tänzer beim Kostümball

== Bibliography ==
- Klaus, Ulrich J. Deutsche Tonfilme: Jahrgang 1938. Klaus-Archiv, 1988.
- Niven, Bill, Hitler and Film: The Führer's Hidden Passion. Yale University Press, 2018.
- Rentschler, Eric. The Ministry of Illusion: Nazi Cinema and Its Afterlife. Harvard University Press, 1996.
