= Don't Promise Me Anything =

1937 film

- Directed by: Wolfgang Liebeneiner
- Written by: Bernd Hofmann; Thea von Harbou
- Based on: Don't Promise Me Anything by Charlotte Rissmann
- Produced by: Herbert Engelsing; Heinrich Jonen
- Starring: Luise Ullrich; Viktor de Kowa; Heinrich George; Hubert von Meyerinck
- Cinematography: Friedl Behn-Grund; Georg Bruckbauer
- Edited by: Walter von Bonhorst
- Music by: Georg Haentzschel
- Production company: Terra Film
- Distributed by: Terra Film
- Release date: 20 August 1937
- Running time: 104 minutes
- Country: Nazi Germany
- Language: German

Don't Promise Me Anything (German: Versprich mir nichts!) is a 1937 German comedy film directed by Wolfgang Liebeneiner and starring Luise Ullrich, Viktor de Kowa and Heinrich George. It was partly shot at the Grunewald Studios in Berlin. The film's sets were designed by the art directors Karl Weber and Erich Zander. The Berlin premiere took place at the Gloria-Palast. In 1950 Liebeneiner remade the film as When a Woman Loves with Hilde Krahl and Johannes Heesters in the lead roles.

== Synopsis ==
A perfectionist but talented artist is reluctant to sell his paintings, but because they need the money his wife sells them without his knowledge and claims to be the artist herself. However, when she is commissioned to paint a mural she turns to her husband for help.

== Cast ==
- Luise Ullrich as Monika
- Viktor de Kowa as Maler Martin Pratt
- Heinrich George as Kunsthändler Felder
- Hubert von Meyerinck as Dr. Elk
- Will Dohm as Konsul Brenkow
- Charlott Daudert as Vera Brenkow
- Hans Hermann Schaufuß as Hausbesitzer Herr Lemke
- Wilhelm P. Krüger as Der Gasmann
- Maria Wanck as Fräulein Klette, Felders Sekräterin
- Leopold von Ledebur as Präsident der Akademie
- Erich Dunskus as Gläubiger #1
- Margot Erbst as Maria, Mädchen bei Pratt
- Maria Loja as Frau Lemke
- Hans Meyer-Hanno as Gläubiger
- Karl-Heinz Reppert as Gläubiger
- Walter Vollmann as Diener bei Felder

== Reception ==
Writing for Night and Day in 1937, Graham Greene gave the film a negative review, describing the film as "unconvincing", and with "the added disadvantage of being [] unfit[] for irrational behaviour". The only point of interest for Greene was the costume and acting of Will Dohm which worryingly evoked German militarism.

== Bibliography ==
- Klaus, Ulrich J. Deutsche Tonfilme: Jahrgang 1937. Klaus-Archiv, 1988.
