= The Day After the Divorce =

1938 film directed by Paul Verhoeven

- Directed by: Paul Verhoeven
- Written by: Wilhelm Ehlers; Wolf Neumeister; Paul Verhoeven
- Based on: The Day After the Divorce by Karl Bachmann
- Produced by: Gerhard Staab
- Starring: Luise Ullrich; Johannes Riemann; Hans Söhnker; Hilde Hildebrand
- Cinematography: Friedl Behn-Grund
- Edited by: Walter von Bonhorst
- Music by: Walter Kollo
- Production companies: Meteor Film; Tobis Film
- Distributed by: Tobis Film
- Release date: 9 September 1938
- Running time: 90 minutes
- Country: Germany
- Language: German

The Day After the Divorce (German: Der Tag nach der Scheidung) is a 1938 German comedy film directed by Paul Verhoeven and starring Luise Ullrich, Johannes Riemann, Hans Söhnker and Hilde Hildebrand. It was shot at the Johannisthal Studios in Berlin. The film's sets were designed by the art directors Karl Weber and Erich Zander.

== Synopsis ==
Feeling that his wife doesn't appreciate him enough Georg Romberg gets a divorce from Bettina, his eye caught by the cabaret singer Susi Lang. Bettina still harbours feelings for Georg so when she runs into the aircraft engineer, Julian who is about to fly off to Batavia, she decides to use him to make her ex-husband jealous. Throughout the day after their divorce Georg and Bettina keep being thrust together. Just as Georg realises he was wrong to leave her for the unreliable Susi, Bettina agrees to accepts Julian's offer to accompany her abroad. Then Georg turns up at her apartment as she is packing her luggage to depart.

== Cast ==
- Luise Ullrich as Bettina Romberg
- Johannes Riemann as Georg Romberg
- Hans Söhnker as Julian Bork, Sportflieger
- Hilde Hildebrand as Susi Lang
- Käthe Haack as Sabine, Bettinas Haushälterin
- Arthur Schröder as Eddy, Operettenbuffo
- Ewald Wenck as Rehwagen, Zeichner bei Romberg
- Werner Pledath as Dr. Merkel, Rombergs Rechtsanwalt
- Wilfried Seyferth as Max Pleschke, Angestellter bei Romberg
- Gerhard Dammann as Der Gerichtsdiener
- Ursula Herking as Die Kellnerin
- Gustav Püttjer as Der Hausknecht
- Ernst Legal as Der Wirt
- Hans Nerking as Der Brautvater
- Heinrich Marlow as Konsul Faber
- Ferenc Bókay as Der Bräutigam
- Gerda Maria Berlit as Die Braut
- Carl Jönsson as Der Gerichtsvorsitzende
- Paul Hildebrandt as Bettinas Rechtsanwalt
- Paul Verhoeven as Der Mechaniker bei Bork
- Michael von Newlinsky as Ein Kellner
- Angelo Ferrari as Ein Gast im Yachtclub
- Käthe Jöken-König as Die Sekretärin bei Georg Romberg

== Bibliography ==
- Bock, Hans-Michael. Die Tobis 1928-1945: eine kommentierte Filmografie. Edition Text + Kritik, 2003.
- Klaus, Ulrich J. Deutsche Tonfilme: Jahrgang 1938. Klaus-Archiv, 1988.
- Nash, Jay Robert & Ross, Stanley Ralph. The Motion Picture Guide: Volumes 1-10. Cinebooks, 1986.
