= Carlos Thompson =

Argentine actor (1923–1990)

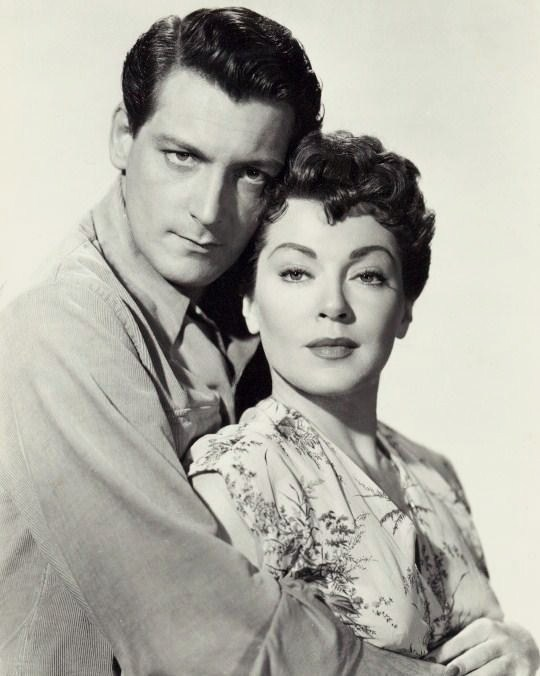
- Thompson and Lana Turner in Flame and the Flesh (1954)
- Born: Juan Carlos Mundin Schaffter; 7 June 1923; Buenos Aires, Argentina
- Died: 10 October 1990 (aged 67); Buenos Aires, Argentina
- Years active: 1950s and 60s
- Spouse: Lilli Palmer (m. 1957; died 1986)

Juan Carlos Mundin-Schaffter, known as Carlos Thompson, (7 June 1923 – 10 October 1990) was an Argentine actor.

== Career ==
Of German and Swiss descent, he played leading roles on stage and in films in Argentina. He went to Hollywood in the 1950s and was typically cast as a European womanizer. His Hollywood films include Flame and the Flesh (1954) with Lana Turner and Pier Angeli, Valley of the Kings (1954), with Robert Taylor and Eleanor Parker, Magic Fire (1955) in which he played Franz Liszt, opposite Yvonne De Carlo, Rita Gam, and Valentina Cortese.

He moved to Europe and appeared in a large number of German films. He was chiefly known to English speakers for his appearance as Carlos Varela in the 1963 ITC Entertainment series The Sentimental Agent. In the late 1960s, Thompson left acting to become a writer and TV producer.

His first success on the European book market was The Assassination of Winston Churchill (1969), a refutation of allegations by David Irving (Accident. The Death of General Sikorski, 1967) and the German playwright Rolf Hochhuth (Soldiers, premiered in the UK in 1968, London) that war time premier Winston Churchill had a part in the death of Polish General Władysław Sikorski, who perished in an air plane crash at Gibraltar on July 4, 1943, allegedly due to sabotage.

== Personal life ==
Thompson married German-born actress Lilli Palmer shortly after her divorce from Rex Harrison in 1957. They remained married until her death in 1986.

Before his marriage to Palmer, Thompson had a relationship with Mexican actress María Félix. They met in Argentina in 1952 during the filming of Luis César Amadori's La pasión desnuda. The relationship was reportedly serious to the point that they became engaged to be married, and Félix even called for her son Enrique Álvarez Félix to meet his potential stepfather. However, during filming, Félix received a call from director Emilio Fernández to offer her the leading role in The Rapture, which Félix accepted, telling Thompson that after filming of La pasión desnuda ended she would return to Mexico to promote the film and announce their future marriage. However, once in Mexico, Felix canceled the wedding days before it would take place, stating that she concluded that the only thing that united her to Thompson was a mere physical attraction and not true love, before marrying The Rapture's leading man Jorge Negrete.

== Death ==
Four years after his wife's death, Thompson died by suicide in Buenos Aires by a gunshot to his head.

== Partial filmography ==
- ...Y mañana serán hombres (1939)
- Fragata Sarmiento (1941)
- Viaje sin regreso (1946)
- Los verdes paraísos (1947)
- Los pulpos (1948)
- La trampa (1949)
- The Crime of Oribe (1950) as Oribe
- Abuso de confianza (1950)
- An Almost Merry Widow (1950)
- The Unwanted (1951)
- Emergency Ward (1952)
- La de los ojos color del tiempo (1952)
- The Tunnel (1952) as Juan Pablo Castel
- The Lady of the Camellias (1953) as Armand Duval
- La pasión desnuda (1953) as Pablo Valdes
- Fort Algiers (1953) as Jeff
- Flame and the Flesh (1954) as Nino
- Valley of the Kings (1954) as Philip Mercedes
- Magic Fire (1956) as Franz Liszt
- Thunderstorm (1956) as Diego Martinez
- Between Time and Eternity (1956) as Manuel
- Goodbye, Franziska (1957) as Stefan Roloff
- The Spessart Inn (1958) as Räuberhauptmann
- I Was All His (1958) as Nikolei Stein
- The Last Rebel (1958) as Joaquin Murrieta
- Raw Wind in Eden (1958) as Wally Drucker
- Stefanie (1958) as Architekt Pablo Guala
- Eva (1959) as Mr. Dott
- The Merry War of Captain Pedro (1959) as Pedro Bastiano, Hauptmann
- Adorable Arabella (1959) as Robert Beaumaris
- Mistress of the World (1960) as Peter Lundström
- The Hero of My Dreams (1960) as Robert Moutier
- Stefanie in Rio (1960) as Pablo Guala
- Big Request Concert (1960) as René von Geldern
- The Last of Mrs. Cheyney (1961) as Artur Dilling
- Aurora Marriage Bureau (1962) as Christinow Tomkin
- The Constant Wife (1962) as Bernard Somerset
- The Gypsy Baron (1962) as Sandor von Barinkay
- A Holiday Like Never Before (1963) as John Valera
- The Sentimental Agent (1963, TV Series UK.) as Carlos Varela
- La Vie de château (1966) as Klopstock (final film role)
