= Marili =

1959 film by Josef von Báky

- Directed by: Josef von Báky
- Written by: István Zágon (play Marika); Emil Burri; Johannes Mario Simmel
- Produced by: Artur Brauner; Fritz Klotsch
- Starring: Sabine Sinjen; Paul Hubschmid; Helmuth Lohner
- Cinematography: Werner Krien; Göran Strindberg
- Edited by: Walter Wischniewsky
- Music by: Georg Haentzschel
- Production company: CCC Film
- Distributed by: Gloria Film
- Release date: 27 November 1959
- Running time: 96 minutes
- Country: West Germany
- Language: German

Marili is a 1959 West German romantic comedy film directed by Josef von Báky and starring Sabine Sinjen, Paul Hubschmid and Helmuth Lohner.

It was shot at the Spandau Studios in Berlin and on location at Berchtesgaden in Bavaria. The film's sets were designed by the art directors Albrecht Hennings and Erich Kettelhut. It was made in Eastmancolor.

== Cast ==
- Sabine Sinjen as Marili
- Paul Hubschmid as Robert Orban
- Helmuth Lohner as Peter Markwart
- Hanne Wieder as Ella Roland
- Ernst Schröder as Waldemar Heller
- Leonard Steckel as Ludwig Ostertag
- Ursula Gütschow as Englischlehrerin
- Käte Jaenicke as Köchin
- Hilde Schönborn as Schneiderin
- Erich Dunskus as Bühnenportier
- Maria Axt as Kesse Dame
- Helmut Ahner as Mixer
- Annie Pauker as 1. Tischdame
- Inge Kühl as 2. Tischdame
- Rudolf Vogel as Berthold Glubb

== Reception ==
A review in the Lexikon des internationales Films stated: "A comedy attempt that seeks to parody the success of the film Stefanie (1959); however, the director's irony remains vague and fades into banality."

Cinema considered that the film was a "completely banal My Fair Lady rip-off."

== See also ==
- Marika (1938)

== Bibliography ==
- Hans-Michael Bock and Tim Bergfelder. The Concise Cinegraph: An Encyclopedia of German Cinema. Berghahn Books, 2009.
