= Anneli =

Female given name

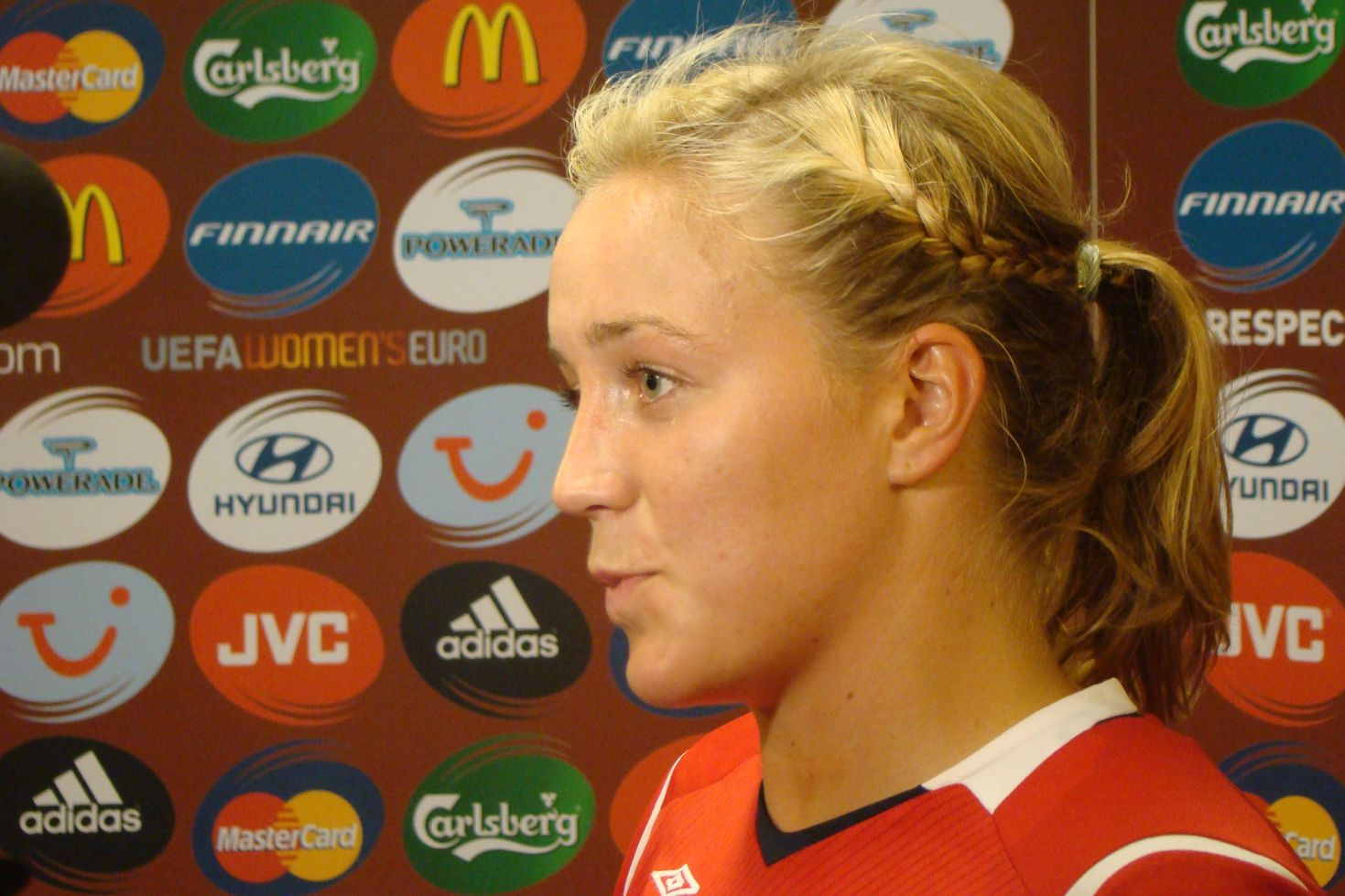
Anneli Giske, Norwegian footballer

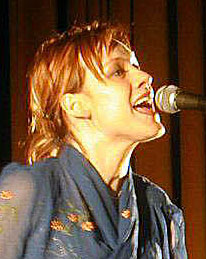
Anneli Drecker, Norwegian singer

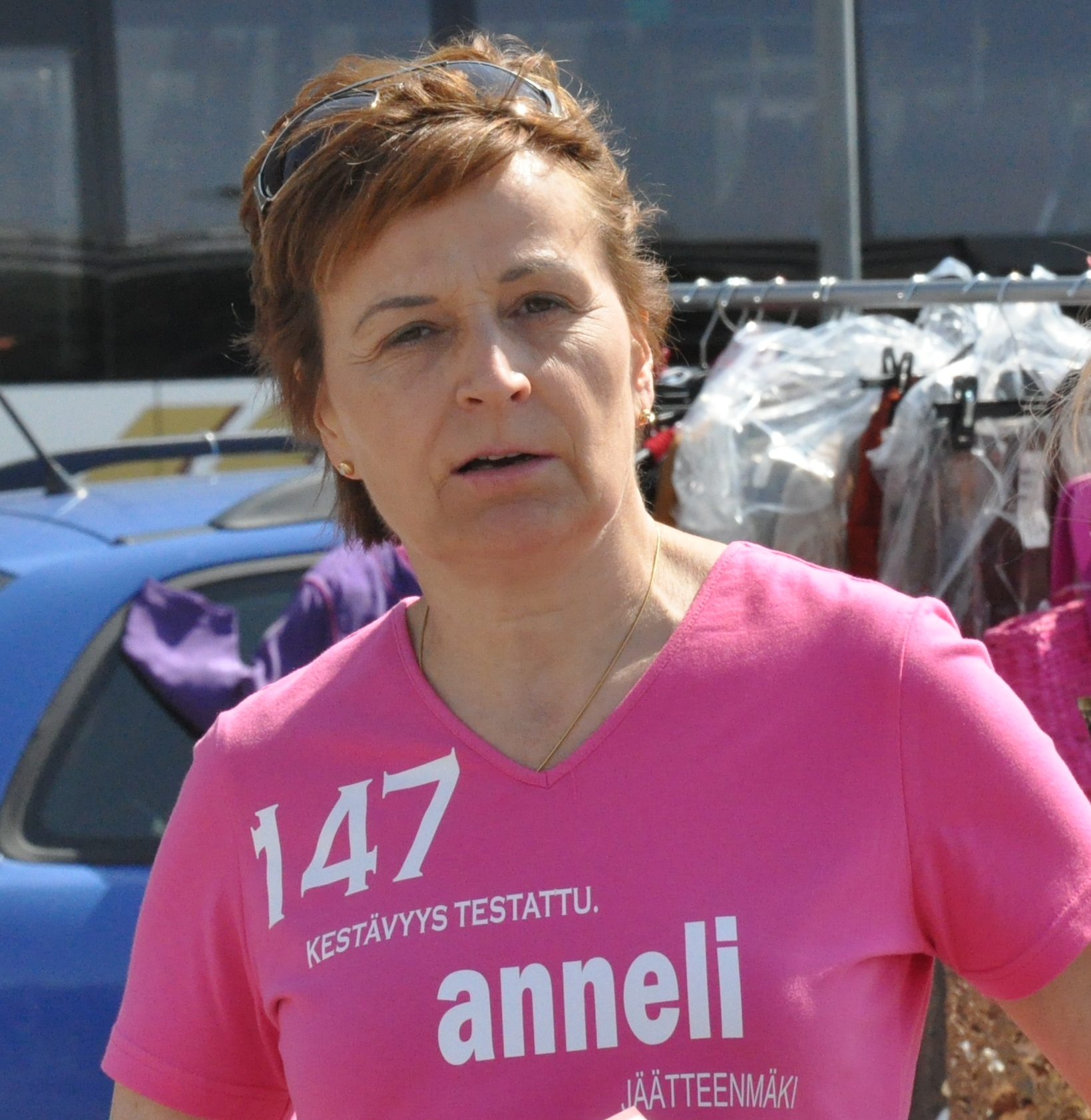
Anneli Jäätteenmäki, the first female Prime Minister of Finland

Anneli is a female given name common in Finland, Sweden, Estonia and Norway. It originated as a variation of the name Anna. It is listed by the Finnish Population Register Centre as one of the top 10 most popular female given names ever.

Country	Number of people who have this name	Nameday	References
Finland	140,000	Dec 9th	
Sweden	27,000	April 21st	
Estonia	3,500	July 26th	
Norway	600	?	

== Notable people ==
Some notable people who have this name include:

- Anneli Ahven (born 1972), Estonian film producer
- Anneli Alderton (1982–2006), English murder victim
- Anneli Alhanko (born 1953), Swedish ballet dancer and actress
- Anneli Björkling (born 1952), Finnish model
- Anneli Drecker (born 1969), German-Norwegian singer
- Anneli Drummond-Hay (1937–2022), English show jumper
- Anneli Giske (born 1985), Norwegian footballer
- Anneli Haaranen (1934–2020), Finnish swimmer
- Anneli Jäätteenmäki (born 1955), the first female prime minister of Finland
- Anneli Jordahl (born 1960), Swedish author and journalist
- Anneli Lambing (born 1968), Estonian badminton player
- Anneli Magnusson (born 1968), Swedish Eurodance artist better known by her stagename Pandora
- Anneli Maley (born 1998), Australian basketball player
- Anneli Martini (born 1948), Swedish actress
- Anneli Ott (born 1976), Estonian politician
- Annely Peebo (born 1971), Estonian opera singer
- Anneli Saaristo (born 1949), Finnish singer and actress
- Anneli Särnblad (born 1968), Swedish politician

== See also ==
- Annelie
