= Stefanie (film) =

1958 film

- Directed by: Josef von Báky
- Written by: Emil Burri; Johannes Mario Simmel; Gitta von Cetto (novel)
- Produced by: Heinrich Jonen
- Starring: Carlos Thompson; Sabine Sinjen; Rainer Penkert; Mady Rahl
- Cinematography: Günther Anders
- Edited by: Carl Otto Bartning
- Music by: Georg Haentzschel
- Production company: UFA
- Distributed by: UFA
- Release date: 23 October 1958
- Running time: 95 minutes
- Country: West Germany
- Language: German

Stefanie is a 1958 West German comedy film directed by Josef von Báky and starring Carlos Thompson, Sabine Sinjen and Rainer Penkert. It was followed by a 1960 sequel Stefanie in Rio.

== Cast ==
- Sabine Sinjen as Stefanie Gonthar
- Carlos Thompson as Architekt Pablo Guala
- Rainer Penkert as Hannes Gonthar
- Peter Vogel as Andreas Gonthar
- Mady Rahl as Sonja
- Elisabeth Flickenschildt as Wirtschafterin Frau Hantke
- Lore Hartling as Pablos Schwester Blanca Guala
- Christiane Maybach as Gabriele
- Gisela Fackeldey as Verkäuferin
- Fritz Eberth as Zwei-Meter-Türhüter
- Benno Hoffmann as Herr "Großer Bär"
- Veronika Götz as Dicke Emma
- Wolfgang Kühne as Lehrer
- Hilde Volk as Lehrerin Frl. Borsig
- Anneliese Würtz as Frau Mohrendiek
- Helmuth Lohner (uncredited)

== Bibliography ==
- Davidson, John & Hake, Sabine. Framing the Fifties: Cinema in a Divided Germany. Berghahn Books, 2007.
