= Languid Kisses, Wet Caresses =

- Directed by: Alfredo Angeli
- Written by: Alfredo Angeli; Bernardino Zapponi
- Starring: Gigi Proietti; Giovanna Ralli
- Cinematography: Giuliano Giustini
- Music by: Guido & Maurizio De Angelis
- Release date: 1976
- Language: Italian

Languid Kisses, Wet Caresses (Italian: Languidi baci... perfide carezze) is a 1976 Italian comedy film directed by Alfredo Angeli.

== Cast ==
- Gigi Proietti as Orfeo Scardamazzi
- Giovanna Ralli as Elena
- Elisa Cegani as Clorinda
- Cristiano Censi as Fabio
- Maria Los as Elettra
- Nerina Montagnani as The Maid
- Giacomo Rizzo as The Policeman

== See also ==
- List of Italian films of 1976
