= The Last Rebel (1958 film) =

1958 film

- Directed by: Miguel Contreras Torres
- Written by: Miguel Contreras Torres
- Starring: Carlos Thompson, Ariadna Welter, Rodolfo Acosta
- Production company: Hispano Continental Films
- Release date: 1958
- Country: Mexico

The Last Rebel (Spanish: El último rebelde) is a 1958 Mexican western film directed and written by Miguel Contreras Torres. It stars Carlos Thompson as Joaquin Murrieta, Ariadna Welter and Rodolfo Acosta. The film was produced by Hispano Continental Films.
