= Shadows of the Past (1936 film) =

- Luise Ullrich in a scene from the film
- Directed by: Werner Hochbaum
- Written by: Karl Buda; Georg C. Klaren; Walter von Hollander
- Produced by: Ernst Neubach
- Starring: Luise Ullrich; Gustav Diessl; Lucie Höflich
- Cinematography: Georg Bruckbauer
- Edited by: Else Baum
- Music by: Anton Profes
- Production company: Donau-Film
- Distributed by: Tobis-Sascha Film
- Release date: 17 July 1936
- Running time: 77 minutes
- Country: Austria
- Language: German

Shadows of the Past (German: Schatten der Vergangenheit) is a 1936 Austrian drama film directed by Werner Hochbaum and starring Luise Ullrich, Gustav Diessl and Lucie Höflich.

The film's sets were designed by Hans Ledersteger.

== Cast ==
- Luise Ullrich as Betty Gall/Helene Gall
- Gustav Diessl as Dr. Hellwig
- Lucie Höflich as Anna
- Oskar Sima as Semmelweich
- Anton Pointner as Emil
- Tibor Halmay as Hayduk
- Rudolf Carl as Inspizient
- Gretel Berndt as Anita Roller
- Albert Heine as Gefängnisdirektor
- Richard Waldemar as Janos
- Mihail Xantho as Untersuchungsrichter
- Robert Valberg as Arzt
- Mizzi Griebl as Garderobenfrau
- Hella Kolniak
- Karin Mairlechner
- Else Pircher
- Oskar Pouché
- Ernst Pröckl
- Grete Wachter
- Das Wiener Boheme-Quartett as Singers

== Bibliography ==
- Bock, Hans-Michael & Bergfelder, Tim. The Concise Cinegraph: Encyclopaedia of German Cinema. Berghahn Books, 2009.
