= Next Year, Same Time =

1967 film

- Film poster
- Directed by: Ulrich Schamoni
- Written by: Ulrich Schamoni; Michael Lentz
- Produced by: Peter Schamoni
- Starring: Ulla Jacobsson; Sabine Sinjen; Johannes Schaaf
- Cinematography: Wolfgang Treu
- Edited by: Heidi Genée
- Music by: Hans Posegga
- Production company: Peter Schamoni Film
- Distributed by: Constantin Film
- Release date: 5 July 1967
- Running time: 87 minutes
- Country: West Germany
- Language: German

Next Year, Same Time (German: Alle Jahre wieder) is a 1967 West German drama film directed by Ulrich Schamoni and starring Ulla Jacobsson, Sabine Sinjen, Johannes Schaaf. The film won three German Film Awards. It was entered into the 17th Berlin International Film Festival where it won the Silver Bear Extraordinary Jury Prize.

== Cast ==
- Ulla Jacobsson as Lore Lücke
- Sabine Sinjen as Inge Deitert
- Hans Dieter Schwarze as Hannes Lücke
- Johannes Schaaf as Spezie
- Hans Posegga as Dr. Meneke
- Hertha Burmeister as Mother of Hannes
- Werner Schwier as Werner
- Lutz Arenz as Lutz
- Helmut Ludwig as Gerd
- Peter Sabinski as Peter
- Harald Zimmer as Harald
- Helmut Müller as Helmut

== Bibliography ==
- Hake, Sabine. German National Cinema. Routledge, 2002.
