= Annelie Pompe =

Swedish freediver and mountaineer (born 1981)

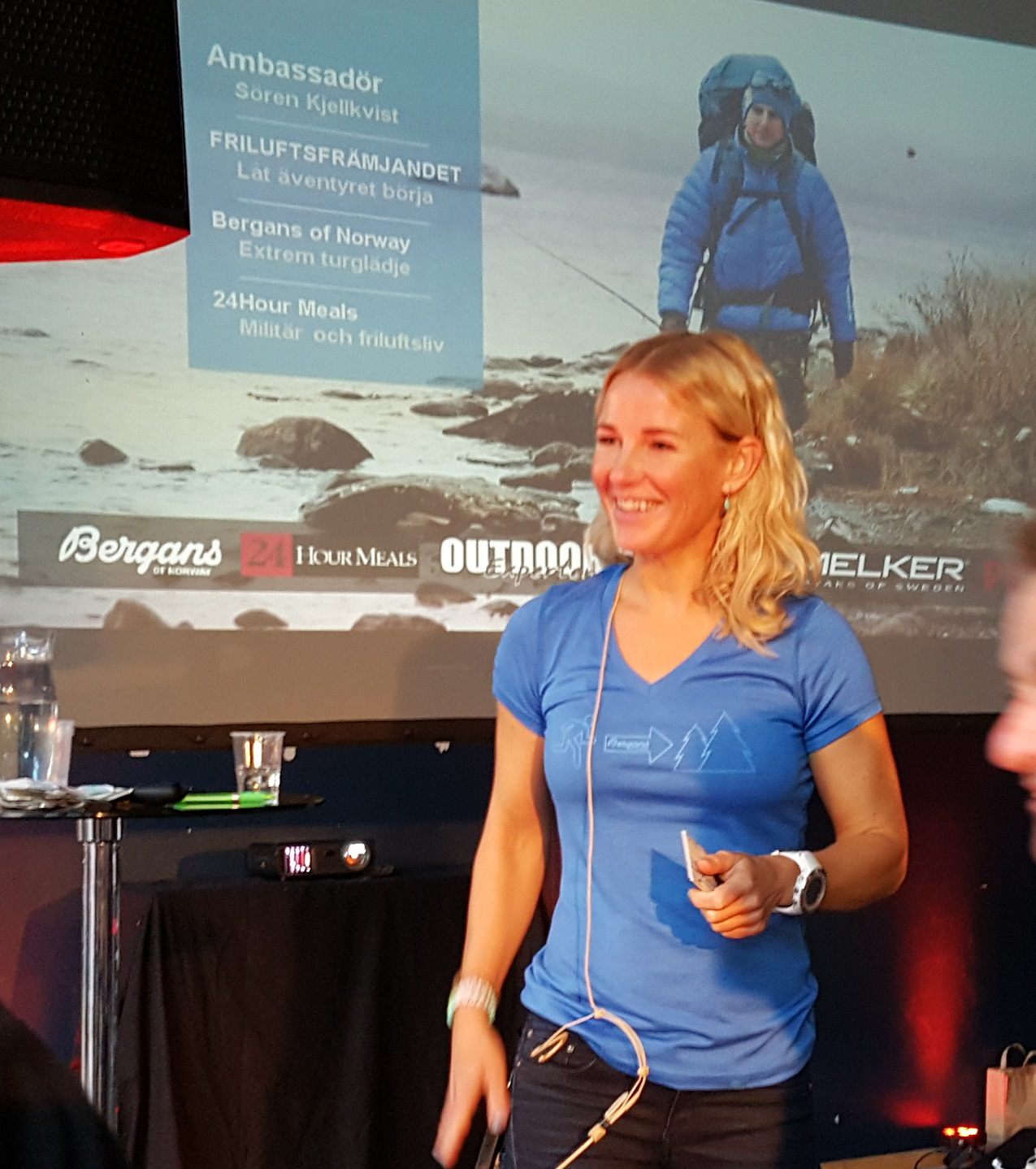
- After a speech in Gothenburg, Sweden, 2016
- Born: 25 February 1981 (age 45); Sweden
- Occupations: writer, photographer, personal trainer, motivational speaker
- Known for: freediving variable weight female world record 2010, summiteer with supplemental oxygen mt. Everest

Annelie Pompe (born 1981) is an adventurer and athlete from Gothenburg, Sweden. She grew up close to the sea and attributes this as being important to her interest in free diving. She is a professional adventurer, helicopter pilot, speaker, and writer about her adventures.

== Freediving ==
Despite considering herself a poor swimmer, Annelie Pompe is known for her achievements in competitive freediving. Pompe began her journey into freediving after she received her scuba certification. Within a few years, she realized that she liked diving into the water without equipment. On 5 October 2010 she broke the world record in variable weight freediving, with a dive down to 126 meters. She also claimed one individual silver medal and one team silver medal in the AIDA world championships. She also holds the Swedish record for the deepest freedive without using fins (CNF), 72 meters below the surface.

== Mountaineering ==
Pompe has been sport climbing since she was 13 years old. In May 2011, she climbed Mount Everest as the first Swedish woman to summit from the north side. Despite marketing her attempt as a climb without oxygen, she did end up using bottled oxygen in order to make the summit. She has climbed all seven Seven Summits (including Puncak Jaya, and the last one Mount Vinson in January 2016).
