= Annelie Botes =

South African writer (1957–2024)

Annelie Botes (born Annelie Basson; 28 June 1957 – 12 December 2024) was a South African writer in the Afrikaans language.

== Life and career ==
Annelie Basson was born on a farm near Grootfontein near the village of Uniondale (Cape Province). She held a teaching degree in music (piano) from the University of South Africa (1986).

She is the author of fifty short stories and novels published in magazines Huisgenoot, Sarie and Rooi Rose. She wrote a regular column in Volksblad and Die Burger.

In November 2010, in an interview with the newspaper Rapport, she caused controversy by declaring that she did not like black people or understand them. Following the statements, the newspaper Die Burger decided to withdraw her column. She refused to retract her remarks and to condemn them. She added that it was "perhaps unfair" to put all black people in the same category.

Botes died on 12 December 2024, at the age of 67.

== Awards ==
- 2010 K Sello Duiker Memorial Literary Award for Thula-thula

== Works ==
- Tabernakel, (2010)
- Thula-thula, (2009)- prix K Sello Duikerde la littérature sud-africaine 2010
  - Thula-Thula (English ed.). Tafelberg. 1 May 2011. ISBN 978-0-624-05373-6.
- Trousseaukis, (2008)
- Sabbatsreis, (2007)
- Broodsonde, (2006)
- Raaiselkind, (2001).
  - Riddle Child. Penguin Books Limited. 3 October 2012. ISBN 978-0-14-352712-1.
- Klawervier, (1997, 2004) - Prix ATKV.
  - Mountain Of Lost Dreams. Penguin Books Limited. 1 October 2012. ISBN 978-0-14-352943-9.
  - Berg der verlorenen Träume (2002)
  - Klavertje Vier.
- Trippel Sewe, (1995, 2007)
