= It (1966 film) =

1966 film

- Directed by: Ulrich Schamoni
- Written by: Ulrich Schamoni
- Produced by: Horst Manfred Adloff
- Starring: Sabine Sinjen
- Cinematography: Gérard Vandenberg
- Edited by: Heidi Genée
- Production company: Horst Manfred Adloff Produktion
- Distributed by: Atlas Film
- Release date: 17 March 1966
- Running time: 86 minutes
- Country: West Germany
- Language: German

It (German: Es) is a 1966 West German film directed by Ulrich Schamoni and starring Sabine Sinjen and Bruno Dietrich.

It was chosen as West Germany's official submission to the 38th Academy Awards for Best Foreign Language Film, but did not manage to receive a nomination. It was also entered into the 1966 Cannes Film Festival.

== Plot ==
The film tells the story of a young couple, a real estate agent and an architectural draughtswoman, and the marriage crisis resulting from a concealed pregnancy and abortion.

== Cast ==
- Sabine Sinjen as Hilke
- Bruno Dietrich as Manfred
- Horst Manfred Adloff as Manfred's boss
- Bernhard Minetti as A customer
- Harry Gillmann as Hilke's father
- Inge Herbrecht as Hilke's mother
- Werner Schwier as Sport fisher
- Ulrike Ulrich as Hilke's Friend
- Tilla Durieux as Old woman from East Germany
- Marcel Marceau
- Ernst Jacobi as the bookseller
