= Alfredo Angeli =

Italian film director and screenwriter

- Born: 7 August 1927; Livorno
- Died: 25 November 2005 (aged 78); Rome
- Occupations: film director, screenwriter

Alfredo Angeli (7 August 1927 in Livorno – 25 November 2005 in Rome) was an Italian director and screenwriter.

Born in Livorno, Angeli entered the cinema industry in 1958, being the assistant director of Luigi Zampa in The City Stands Trial; after having collaborated with, among others, Camillo Mastrocinque and Vittorio Cottafavi, in the early 1960s he started working as a director of commercial, and between the 1960s and the 1990s he directed over 3,000 commercials. He made his feature film directorial debut in 1967, with the satirical The Strange Night, which was entered into the 17th Berlin International Film Festival. In 1981 he directed a RAI TV-series of great success, Benedetta & Company.

== Filmography ==
- 1967: The Strange Night
- 1976: Languid Kisses, Wet Caresses
- 1983: Benedetta & Company (TV)
- 1984: L'addio a Enrico Berlinguer (Co-director)
- 1997: Con rabbia e con amore
- 1999: Giochi pericolosi (TV)
- 2001: Un altro mondo è possibile
