= Christian Wolff (actor) =

German actor

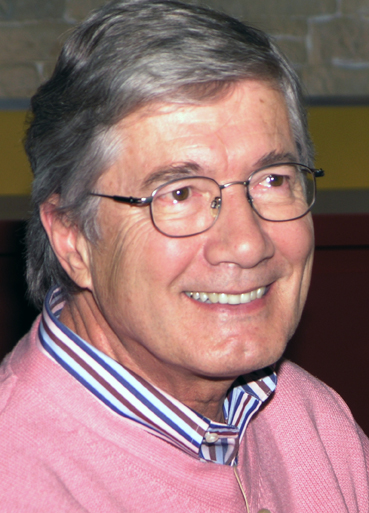
- Born: 11 March 1938 (age 88); Berlin, Germany
- Occupation: Actor
- Years active: 1957–present

Christian Wolff (born 11 March 1938) is a German film actor. He has appeared in more than 100 films and television shows since 1957.

== Selected filmography ==
- Precocious Youth (1957)
- Court Martial (1959)
- Old Heidelberg (1959)
- The Blue Moth (1959)
- Crime After School (1959)
- Carnival Confession (1960)
- Final Accord (1960)
- Via Mala (1961)
- Lana, Queen of the Amazons (1964)
- Die Schlüssel (1965, TV miniseries)
- Rheinsberg (1967)
- Sie nannten ihn Krambambuli (1972)
- Derrick - Season 4, Episode 08: "Via Bangkok" (1977)
- Lady Audley's Secret (1978, TV film)
- Derrick - Season 10, Episode 3: "Geheimnisse einer Nacht" (1983)
- Forsthaus Falkenau (1989-2006; TV series)
