= Ulrich Schamoni =

German film director (1939–1998)

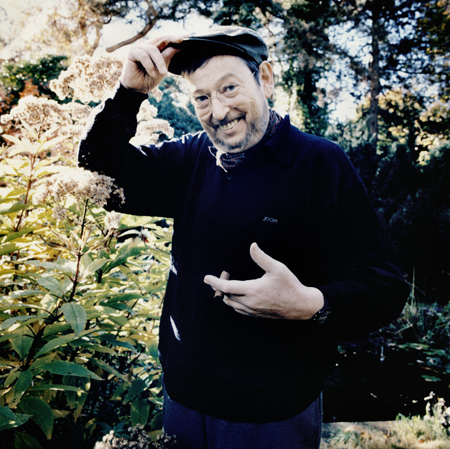
Ulrich Schamoni 1997

Ulrich Schamoni (9 November 1939 – 9 March 1998) was a German film director, screenwriter, actor and media proprietor.

== Biography ==
Schamoni began his career as an assistant director, among others for William Dieterle. He was a signatory of the Oberhausen Manifesto in 1962. His first feature film, It (1966), won five German Film Awards. His 1967 film Next Year, Same Time won the Silver Bear Extraordinary Jury Prize at the 17th Berlin International Film Festival.

He was the brother of Peter Schamoni, also a film director and producer.

Ulrich Schamoni died on the March 9, 1998 in Berlin as a result of a cancer illness and was buried at the Waldfriedhof Zehlendorf in that city's Zehlendorf district.

== Selected filmography ==
- 1966: It
- 1967: Next Year, Same Time
- 1968: Quartett im Bett
- 1970: We Two
- 1971: Eins
- 1973: Chapeau Claque
- 1979: The Dream House
- 1985: Alles Paletti (as actor)
- 2011: Farewell to the Frogs (final film, edited by his daughter Ulrike)
