= List of West German films of 1968 =

List of films produced in West Germany in 1968

List of West German films of 1968. Feature films produced and distributed in West Germany in 1968.

== 1968 ==
Title	Director	Cast	Genre	Notes
24 Hour Lover	Marran Gosov	Harald Leipnitz, Herbert Bötticher, Brigitte Skay, Claudia Wedekind, Monika Lundi, Renate Roland	Comedy	a.k.a. Twenty-Four Hour Lover a.k.a. The Sex Adventures of a Single Man
24 Hours in the Life of a Woman	Dominique Delouche	Danielle Darrieux, Robert Hoffmann	Drama	a.k.a. Twenty-Four Hours in the Life of a Woman. French-West German co-production
Ein Abschiedsbrief	Werner Schlechte	Doris Schade, Otto Mächtlinger, Fred Maire	Crime	a.k.a. Affaire vous concernant
The Accident	Peter Beauvais	Manuel Galiana, José Luis Gómez	Drama	
Adam 2	Jan Lenica	—N/a	Animated film	
Altaich	Karlheinz Bieber	Michl Lang, Beppo Brem, Rudolf Rhomberg, Ilse Steppat, Robert Meyn, Barbara Schöne, Claus Ringer	Comedy	
Always Trouble with the Teachers	Harald Vock	Roy Black, Uschi Glas, Georg Thomalla	Comedy	
Andrea the Nympho	Hans Schott-Schöbinger	Dagmar Lassander, Arthur Brauss, Hans von Borsody, Joachim Hansen, Herbert Fux	Softcore	
Angel Baby	Marran Gosov	Gila von Weitershausen, Hans Clarin, Christof Wackernagel	Comedy	a.k.a. Engelchen
Angelique and the Sultan	Bernard Borderie	Michèle Mercier, Robert Hossein, Jean-Claude Pascal, Helmuth Schneider, Bruno Dietrich	Adventure	French-Italian-West German co-production
Anna Böckler	Robert A. Stemmle	Heinz Weiss	Crime, Docudrama	
Another Man's Wife and a Husband Under the Bed	Oswald Döpke	Paul Dahlke, Karin Eickelbaum, Michael Degen	Comedy	a.k.a. Die fremde Frau und der Mann unterm Bett
Antonia	Klaus Kirschner	Brigitte Horney	Fantasy	
Artists Under the Big Top: Perplexed	Alexander Kluge	Hannelore Hoger, Klaus Schwarzkopf, Alfred Edel	Drama	a.k.a. Artists in the Big Top: Perplexed. Winner of Golden Lion at Venice Film Festival
At the Gate of Heaven	Franz Josef Wild	Peter Pasetti, Paola Loew	Drama	a.k.a. Ein Schweigen am Himmel a.k.a. Ein Schweigen vom Himmel
Die Aufgabe	Karlheinz Bieber	Hannelore Schroth, Inge Langen	Drama	
Die aufrichtige Lügnerin	Trude Kolman	Herbert Bötticher, Karin Eickelbaum, Hans Korte	Crime comedy	a.k.a. The Honest Liar a.k.a. A Shot in the Dark
Der Auftrag	Gustav Burmester	Karin Anselm, Werner Bruhns, Katharina Brauren	Cold War spy film	
Babeck	Wolfgang Becker	Curd Jürgens, Senta Berger, Helmuth Lohner, Cordula Trantow, Charles Régnier	Mystery thriller	
Bahnwärter Thiel	Werner Völger	Heinz Baumann, Eva Kotthaus	Drama	a.k.a. Lineman Thiel a.k.a. Flagman Thiel a.k.a. Signalman Thiel
The Basement	Imo Moszkowicz	Harald Leipnitz, Ernst Stankovski, Franziska Oehme	Drama	a.k.a. Tiefparterre
The Battle of Lobositz	Franz Peter Wirth	Bruno Ganz, Harald Leipnitz, Ernst Fritz Fürbringer, Werner Kreindl, Heinz Weiss	Drama	
Die Begnadigung	Otto Tausig	Werner Kreindl, Boris Mattèrn, Kurt Nachmann	Drama	Based on the Halsman murder case
Bel Ami	Helmut Käutner	Helmut Griem, Violetta Ferrari, Erika Pluhar, Dagmar Altrichter	Comedy	
Berliner Antigone	Rainer Wolffhardt	Donata Höffer, Dieter Borsche, Ilse Steppat	Drama, War	
Berliner Blockade	Rudolf Jugert	Dieter Borsche, Hans Hinrich, Hilde Körber, Gisela Fackeldey	Docudrama	a.k.a. Berlin Blockade
Das Berliner Zimmer	Korbinian Köberle	Walter Fein, Xenia Pörtner, Klaus Höhne	Drama	
Beyond Control	Helmut Förnbacher	William Berger, Helga Anders, Giorgia Moll	Crime	a.k.a. What a Way to Die a.k.a. Freckles. West German-Italian co-production
The Bird Seller	Joachim Hess	Peter Minich, Lucia Popp, Renate Holm, Ernst Schütz, Theo Lingen	Musical	a.k.a. Der Vogelhändler
The Blood of Fu Manchu	Jesús Franco	Christopher Lee, Richard Greene, Götz George, Loni von Friedl	Thriller	British-Spanish-West German co-production
The Blue Straw Hat	Hans Dieter Schwarze	Hannelore Elsner, Annemarie Düringer, Peter Weck, Claus Biederstaedt	Comedy	
Bombenwalzer	Kurt Wilhelm	Gerhard Riedmann, Hans von Borsody, Ernst Stankovski, Beppo Brem	Musical	
Break the Power of the Manipulators	Helke Sander	Christian Ziewer	Documentary	a.k.a. Brecht die Macht der Manipulateure. West German-Finnish co-production
The Bridegroom, the Actress, and the Pimp	Straub–Huillet	Rainer Werner Fassbinder, Hanna Schygulla, Irm Hermann, Peer Raben	Short	a.k.a. The Bridegroom, the Comedienne and the Pimp
Ein Bürger von Calais	Oswald Döpke	Carl Lange, Günter Strack, Erika Pluhar	Drama	
Candle Light	Ferry Olsen	Peter Weck, Loni von Friedl, Franz Stoss	Musical	a.k.a. By Candlelight
Carl Schurz	Rudolf Nussgruber	Udo Vioff, Christian Rode, Günter Strack	Biography, History	
The Castle	Rudolf Noelte	Maximilian Schell, Cordula Trantow, Helmut Qualtinger	Drama	
Castle of the Creeping Flesh	Adrian Hoven	Janine Reynaud, Howard Vernon, Michel Lemoine	Horror	a.k.a. Im Schloß der blutigen Begierde
The Cat Has Nine Lives	Ula Stöckl	Liane Hielscher	Drama	a.k.a. The Cat Has 9 Lives
The Chronicle of Anna Magdalena Bach	Straub–Huillet	Gustav Leonhardt, Christiane Lang	Biography, Music	Entered into the 18th Berlin International Film Festival
The Class	Wolfgang Staudte	Heinz Meier, Herbert Fux, Lotte Ledl, Ida Ehre, Stanislav Ledinek	Drama	
The Colonel's Nieces	Erwin C. Dietrich	Kai Fischer, Tamara Baroni, Heidrun Hankammer	Softcore	a.k.a. Guess Who's Coming for Breakfast. Swiss-West German-Italian co-production
Commandos	Armando Crispino	Lee Van Cleef, Joachim Fuchsberger, Götz George, Heinz Reincke	War	Italian-West German co-production
Count Oederland	Rolf Hädrich	Bernhard Wicki, Nicole Heesters, Ernst Jacobi, Agnes Fink, Hans Caninenberg	Drama	a.k.a. Graf Öderland
Darling Caroline	Denys de La Patellière	France Anglade, Gert Fröbe, Karin Dor, Vittorio De Sica, Charles Aznavour, Jean-Claude Brialy, Bernard Blier	Drama	French-West German-Italian co-production
Death and Diamonds	Harald Reinl	George Nader, Heinz Weiss, Carl Möhner, Claus Holm	Thriller	Jerry Cotton film. West German-Italian co-production
Death in the Red Jaguar	Harald Reinl	George Nader, Heinz Weiss, Carl Lange, Grit Boettcher	Thriller	Jerry Cotton film. West German-Italian co-production
Death of a Salesman	Gerhard Klingenberg	Heinz Rühmann, Christoph Bantzer, Käthe Gold	Drama	
Der deutsche Meister	Rolf von Sydow	Stefan Wigger, Horst Bollmann	Comedy, Sport	a.k.a. The German Champion
Difference of Opinion	Rolf von Sydow	Wolfgang Preiss, Klaus Schwarzkopf	Drama	a.k.a. Meinungsverschiedenheiten
Dirty Hands	Franz Peter Wirth	Carl Raddatz, Christoph Bantzer, Sonja Sutter	Drama	
The Doctor of St. Pauli	Rolf Olsen	Curd Jürgens, Dieter Borsche, Heinz Reincke, Fritz Wepper	Crime	
The Duck Rings at Half Past Seven	Rolf Thiele	Heinz Rühmann, Charles Régnier, Hertha Feiler	Comedy	a.k.a. The Duck Rings at 7:30. West German-Italian co-production
Duell um Aimée	Ottokar Runze	Violetta Ferrari, Günther Ungeheuer, Fred Haltiner	Musical	
Die Einladung	Heinz Schimmelpfennig	Walter Jokisch, Martin Lüttge, Elisabeth Kuhlmann, Renate Grosser, Barbara Nüsse, Holger Hagen	Drama	
Ein ehrenwerter Herr	Wolfgang Liebeneiner	Heinz Bennent, Alexander Kerst	Crime	a.k.a. Un grand honnête homme
Der Eine und der Andere	Tom Toelle	Vadim Glowna, Iskandar Morawiecz	Drama	
Einer fehlt beim Kurkonzert	Jürgen Roland	Hans Putz, Lale Andersen, Jürgen Draeger, Ralf Wolter	Crime	
Emma Hamilton	Christian-Jaque	Michèle Mercier, Richard Johnson, John Mills, Nadja Tiller, Harald Leipnitz, Gisela Uhlen, Boy Gobert, Dieter Borsche	Biography	French-Italian-West German-American co-production
Endkampf	Rainer Erler	Gustl Bayrhammer, Ruth Drexel	War	
Entire Days in the Trees	Tom Toelle	Roma Bahn, Heinz Bennent, Ulli Philipp	Drama	a.k.a. Whole Days in the Trees
Die Entwaffnung	Lutz Büscher	Stefan Wigger, Uta Hallant, Wolfgang Reichmann	Drama	
Eine etwas sonderbare Dame	Karlheinz Bieber	Brigitte Horney, Eva Pflug, Harald Leipnitz, Ilse Steppat, Monika Peitsch, Christian Doermer, Dieter Borsche	Comedy	a.k.a. The Curious Savage
The Exchange	Oscar Fritz Schuh	Heinz Ehrenfreund, Lola Müthel, Ruth Niehaus, Hubert Suschka	Drama	a.k.a. The Trade a.k.a. Der Tausch. West German-Austrian co-production
Der Fall Petkov	Wolfgang Werner	Ullrich Haupt, Wolfgang Preiss, Reinhard Kolldehoff	Docudrama	a.k.a. The Trial of Nikola D. Petkov
Der Fall Wera Sassulitsch	Wolfgang Schleif	Ulli Philipp, Karl Michael Vogler, Raimund Harmstorf	History, Docudrama	a.k.a. The Case of Vera Zasulich
Feierabend	Hans Dieter Schwarze	Hermann Günther, Hans-Joachim Zenke, Erhart Stettner	Drama	
Der Feldmarschall	Hermann Kutscher	Bernhard Wicki, Anaid Iplicjian, Michael Heltau	Drama	Austrian-West German co-production
Feldwebel Schmid	Nathan Jariv	Karl Michael Vogler, Helmut Förnbacher, Richard Münch	War	
Flachsmann the Educator	Rolf von Sydow	Wolfgang Preiss, Claus Biederstaedt	Comedy	
Françoise et Udo	Pierre Koralnik	Françoise Hardy, Udo Jürgens	Musical	a.k.a. Françoise & Udo. French-West German co-production
The Game of Love and Chance	Hans-Reinhard Müller	Gerlinde Locker, Matthias Fuchs, Hans Clarin, Friedrich Joloff	Comedy	a.k.a. Das Spiel von Liebe und Zufall
Gäste aus Deutschland	Karl Heinz Deickert	Irmgard Först, Charles Moulin, René Berthier	Drama	
Go for It, Baby	May Spils	Werner Enke, Uschi Glas, Henry van Lyck	Comedy	a.k.a. Zur Sache, Schätzchen
God's Police Patrol	Hubert Frank	Günther Neutze, Leon Askin, Günther Stoll, Anthony Steel, Tania Béryl	Crime	Austrian-West German co-production
Gold für Montevasall	Thomas Engel	Walter Giller	Comedy, Sport	
The Gorilla of Soho	Alfred Vohrer	Horst Tappert, Uschi Glas, Uwe Friedrichsen, Hubert von Meyerinck, Herbert Fux	Mystery thriller	a.k.a. Gorilla Gang a.k.a. Ape Creature. Based on Edgar Wallace
Der Griller	George Moorse	Rolf Zacher, Franziska Oehme, Angelika Bender	Drama	a.k.a. The Griller
Heartbreak House	Kurt Meisel	Siegfried Lowitz, Margot Trooger, Ulli Philipp, Ursula Lingen, Axel von Ambesser, Kurt Meisel	Comedy	a.k.a. Haus Herzenstod
Heimlichkeiten	Wolfgang Staudte	Karl Michael Vogler, Reinhild Solf, Apostol Karamitev	Drama	a.k.a. Little Secrets. West German-Bulgarian co-production.
Henry VIII and His Wives	Heinz Schirk	Hans Dieter Zeidler, Karin Anselm, Christine Wodetzky, Monika Peitsch, Hannelore Schroth	Drama, Biography, History	a.k.a. Royal Gambit
Hinter den Wänden	Claus Landsittel	Horst Tappert, Jürgen Thormann, Monika Madras, Benno Sterzenbach	Drama	a.k.a. Les Murs
Der Holledauer Schimmel	Kurt Wilhelm	Gerlinde Locker, Gerhard Riedmann, Monika Dahlberg, Gerhart Lippert, Gustl Bayrhammer, Alexander Golling, Michl Lang	Comedy	
Home and the Heart	Rolf von Sydow	Uwe Friedrichsen, Claudia Wedekind, Alexander Golling, Herbert Bötticher	Drama	a.k.a. Heim und Herd
The Hound of Blackwood Castle	Alfred Vohrer	Heinz Drache, Karin Baal, Horst Tappert, Siegfried Schürenberg, Agnes Windeck, Hans Söhnker	Mystery thriller	a.k.a. The Horror of Blackwood Castle. Based on Edgar Wallace
The Iceman Cometh	Günter Gräwert	Günther Lüders, Götz George, Heinz Theo Branding, Rudolf Forster, William Ray, Walter Jokisch	Drama	a.k.a. Der Eismann kommt
Ich stehe zur Verfügung	Heinrich Koch	Siegfried Lowitz, Benno Sterzenbach	Drama	
Der ldiot	Rolf von Sydow	Gerd Baltus, Karin Hübner, Klaus Schwarzkopf	Drama	
Im Banne des Unheimlichen	Alfred Vohrer	Joachim Fuchsberger, Wolfgang Kieling, Siw Mattson, Pinkas Braun, Hubert von Meyerinck	Mystery thriller	a.k.a. The Zombie Walks a.k.a. The Hand of Power. Based on Edgar Wallace
Das imaginäre Leben des Straßenkehrers Auguste G.	Eberhard Itzenplitz	Traugott Buhre, Verena Buss, Xenia Pörtner, Udo Vioff	Drama	a.k.a. La vie imaginaire de l'éboueur Auguste G.
Immer nur Mordgeschichten	Wilhelm Semmelroth	Sieghardt Rupp, Krista Keller	Thriller	a.k.a. Ashes to Ashes
Iphigenie auf Tauris	Hans Hartleb	Inge Langen, Peter Pasetti, Hermann Treusch	Drama	a.k.a. Iphigenia in Tauris
Irretrievable	Falk Harnack	Karin Hübner, Lothar Blumhagen, Solveig Thomas, Lil Dagover	Drama	a.k.a. Beyond Recall a.k.a. No Way Back
Jet Generation	Eckhart Schmidt	Dginn Moeller, Roger Fritz, Jürgen Draeger	Crime	
Johannes durch den Wald	Günter Gräwert	Klaus-Hagen Latwesen, Ilse Pagé	Docudrama	a.k.a. Johannes durch den Wald – Die wahre Geschichte vom Räuberhauptmann Schinderhannes
Die Jubilarin	Paul Vasil	Rosemarie Fendel, Benno Sterzenbach, Claus Ringer	Comedy	
Justice for Selwyn	Jiří Weiss	Rudolf Hrušínský, Klaus Schwarzkopf	Comedy	Czechoslovak-West German co-production
Die Katze	Karl Fruchtmann	Donata Höffer, Ralf Schermuly, Siegfried Wischnewski	Drama	
Kidnap – Die Entführung des Lindbergh-Babys	Helmut Ashley	Rolf Becker, Norbert Kappen, Albert Lieven, Paul Dahlke, Dieter Borsche, Hellmut Lange, Günther Ungeheuer	Docudrama, Crime	
The Killer Likes Candy	Maurice Cloche	Kerwin Mathews, Bruno Cremer, Werner Peters, Lukas Ammann, Sieghardt Rupp, Gordon Mitchell	Thriller	French-Italian-West German co-production
Kimper & Co.	Rainer Wolffhardt	Stefan Wigger	Drama	
Kinder des Schattens	Günter Gräwert	Siegfried Rauch, Doris Kunstmann	Comedy	
Die Kinder von Geltenhausen	Gerd Oelschlegel	Marion Martienzen	Drama	a.k.a. Ping Pong
Kirschen für Rom	Korbinian Köberle	Peter Schütte, Monika Peitsch, Klaus Schwarzkopf	Comedy	
Knüpfe das Netz nach dem Fisch	Rüdiger Graf	Hannelore Elsner, Ullrich Haupt, Franziskus Abgottspon	Drama	
Kolportage	Wilhelm Semmelroth	Sonja Ziemann, Lukas Ammann, Fritz Wepper, Christiane Krüger	Comedy	
Komm nur, mein liebstes Vögelein	Rolf Thiele	Gerd Baltus, Christiane Rücker, Maria Brockerhoff, Barbara Capell, Inken Sommer, Inge Marschall, Sybil Danning	Sex comedy	West German-Italian co-production
Kommissar X – Drei blaue Panther	Gianfranco Parolini	Tony Kendall, Brad Harris	Eurospy thriller	a.k.a. Kill, Panther, Kill! Kommissar X film. West German-Italian co-production
Kraft des Gesetzes	Rolf Hädrich	Max Eckard	Drama	
Eine Krankheit genannt Leben	Max Friedmann	Peter Mosbacher, Loni von Friedl, Paul Edwin Roth, Erik Schumann	Drama	a.k.a. Zeno's Conscience
Die Landstreicher	Peter Dörre	Peter Minich, Elfriede Ott, Heinz Erhardt, Helge Rosvaenge, Elfie Mayerhofer	Musical	a.k.a. The Vagabonds. Austrian-West German co-production
The Last Mercenary	Mel Welles	Ray Danton, Pascale Petit, Günther Stoll, Carl Möhner	Action	West German-Spanish-Italian co-production
The Last Roman	Robert Siodmak	Laurence Harvey, Orson Welles, Sylva Koscina, Honor Blackman, Harriet Andersson, Robert Hoffmann, Michael Dunn, Friedrich von Ledebur	Epic	a.k.a. The Fight for Rome a.k.a. A Struggle for Rome. West German-Italian-Romanian co-production
Last Words	Werner Herzog		Short	
Lebeck	Johannes Schaaf	Heinz Meier, Christian Wolff, Christine Wodetzky	Drama	
Liebe und so weiter	George Moorse	Vera Tschechowa, Vadim Glowna, Rolf Zacher	Drama	a.k.a. Love and So Forth
Liliomfi	Karlheinz Bieber	Gundolf Willer, Maria Brockerhoff, Ulli Philipp, Eva Pflug, Robert Meyn, Rudolf Rhomberg, Ilse Steppat	Comedy	
Little Vampire	Roland Klick	Renate Roland, Sieghardt Rupp, Jürgen Jung	Thriller	a.k.a. Bübchen
The Long Day of Inspector Blomfield	Rudolf Zehetgruber	Götz George, Anthony Steel, Werner Pochath, Siegfried Wischnewski, Ingeborg Schöner	Crime	
Madame Bovary	Hans Dieter Schwarze	Elfriede Irrall, Dietmar Schönherr, Günter Strack	Drama	
Madame Caillaux	Werner Schlechte	Barbara Rütting, Dieter Borsche	Docudrama	
Madame Legros	Michael Kehlmann	Elfriede Kuzmany, Gerd Baltus, Walter Rilla, Horst Niendorf, Elisabeth Neumann-Viertel	Drama	
Madame Sans-Gêne	Günter Gräwert	Louise Martini, Klaus Schwarzkopf, Günter Strack, Peter Weck, Arno Assmann, Rudolf Schündler	Musical	
The Magnificent Tony Carrera	José Antonio de la Loma	Thomas Hunter, Gila von Weitershausen, Fernando Sancho	Crime	Spanish-Italian-West German co-production
Ein Mann namens Harry Brent	Peter Beauvais	Brigitte Grothum, Günther Ungeheuer, Wolfgang Preiss, Gert Haucke, Dirk Dautzenberg	Mystery thriller	a.k.a. A Man Called Harry Brent
Marionettes, Inc.	Gedeon Kovács	Günther Ungeheuer, Herbert Fleischmann, Kathrin Ackermann	Science fiction	a.k.a. Ich auf Bestellung
Match	Wolfgang Becker	Götz George, Loni von Friedl	Comedy	
Mathilde Möhring	Claus Peter Witt	Cornelia Froboess, Ernst Jacobi, Edda Seippel	Drama	
A Matrimony	Hans Rolf Strobel, Heinrich Tichawsky	Heidi Stroh, Peter Graaf	Drama	
The Mayor of Zalamea	Oswald Döpke	Paul Dahlke, Wolfgang Büttner, Kornelia Boje, Michael Degen, Gerd Baltus	Drama	
The Memorandum	Wilm ten Haaf	Hans Caninenberg, Hannelore Elsner, Klaus Höhne	Comedy	a.k.a. Die Benachrichtigung
The Merchant of Venice	Otto Schenk	Fritz Kortner, Sabine Sinjen, Max Eckard, Folker Bohnet, Gertraud Jesserer, Peter Vogel, Boy Gobert, Karl Paryla	Drama	West German-Austrian co-production
Die mexikanische Revolution	Jürgen Goslar	Konrad Georg, Erik Schumann, Horst Niendorf, Ernst Fritz Fürbringer, Claus Biederstaedt	History	a.k.a. The Mexican Revolution
Miracle of Love	Franz Josef Gottlieb	Oswalt Kolle, Wilfried Gössler, Biggi Freyer, Katarina Haertel, Régis Vallée	Anthology, Docudrama	a.k.a. Oswalt Kolle: Das Wunder der Liebe
Miss Julie	Fritz Umgelter	Luitgard Im, Werner Kreindl	Drama	a.k.a. Fräulein Julie
Das Missverständliche im Leben des Herrn Knöbel	Eberhard Itzenplitz	Hans Helmut Dickow	Drama	
The Moment to Kill	Giuliano Carnimeo	George Hilton, Loni von Friedl, Horst Frank, Walt Barnes, Rudolf Schündler	Western	Italian-West German co-production
Moment's Caress	August Rieger	Angelica Ott, Erik Schumann, Sieghardt Rupp, Christiane Rücker, Rainer Basedow, Claus Ringer, Herbert Fux	Crime	a.k.a. Engel der Sünde a.k.a. 69 Liebesspiele
Money to Burn	Karlheinz Bieber	Karl-Georg Saebisch, Joachim Teege, Barbara Schöne, Rudolf Rhomberg	Crime comedy	a.k.a. Die seltsamen Ansichten des Mr. Eliot
The Month of the Falling Leaves	Dietrich Haugk	Ernst Fritz Fürbringer, Kornelia Boje, Lucie Mannheim, Karl Lieffen	Thriller	
Mord in Frankfurt	Rolf Hädrich	Václav Voska, Joachim Ansorge, Monika Lundi, Karl-Heinz von Hassel, Dirk Dautzenberg	Drama	
Mördergesellschaft	Jan Ellrich	Walter Giller, Robert Meyn, Hannelore Elsner, Lucie Mannheim, Rosl Schäfer	Crime comedy	a.k.a. Les Assassins associés
Morning's at Seven	Kurt Hoffmann	Gerlinde Locker, Peter Arens, Werner Hinz, Agnes Windeck, Diana Körner, Rolf Zacher	Comedy	
Die Mühle von Sanssouci	Erich Neureuther	Paul Esser, Uwe-Jens Pape, Karin Anselm, Dunja Rajter, Peter Capell	Musical	
Nachtcafé	Thomas Fantl	Heinz Bennent, Elisabeth Orth	Drama	a.k.a. Appelez-moi Rose
Napoleon in New Orleans	Wilm ten Haaf	Ilse Ritter, Peter Mosbacher, Karl-Maria Schley	Crime comedy	
Nationalkomitee "Freies Deutschland"	Georg Tressler	Carl Lange	War, Docudrama	a.k.a. The National Committee for a Free Germany
Negresco	Klaus Lemke	Ira von Fürstenberg, Gérard Blain, Paul Hubschmid	Thriller	a.k.a. My Bed Is Not for Sleeping
The New Life Style	Jerzy Macc	Horst Tappert, Renate von Holt, Charlotte Kerr	Drama	a.k.a. Heißer Sand auf Sylt
Novemberverbrecher	Carlheinz Caspari	Otto Graf, Ernst Fritz Fürbringer, Rudolf Rohlinger	Docudrama, War	
Of Mice and Men	Rolf Hädrich	Wolfgang Reichmann, Peer Schmidt, Ingmar Zeisberg, Hans Clarin, Hellmut Lange, Theodor Wonja Michael	Drama	a.k.a. Von Mäusen und Menschen
Orpheus und Eurydike	Václav Kašlík	Waldemar Kmentt, Ingeborg Hallstein	Opera	a.k.a. Orfeo ed Euridice. West German-Austrian co-production
Der Partyphotograph	Hans Dieter Bove	Rolf Zacher, Werner Finck, Barbara Valentin	Comedy	a.k.a. Der Partyfotograf
Peter und Sabine	August Rieger	Ilona Grübel, Ingeborg Schöner, Heinz Sonnbichler, Barbara Capell, Jan Koester, Claus Ringer, Maria Sebaldt, Hans Dieter Schwarze	Drama	
Phoebus	Werner Schlechte	Heinz Moog	Crime comedy	a.k.a. Phoebus oder Die Aalbucht
Pickwick	Rudolph Cartier	Erwin Wohlfahrt, Martha Mödl, Peter Kraus	Musical	
Pole Poppenspäler	Günther Anders	Walter Richter, Werner Schumacher, Ilona Grübel, Gerda Gmelin, Gerda-Maria Jürgens	Drama	a.k.a. Paul the Puppeteer
Professor Columbus	Rainer Erler	Rudolf Platte, Jeroen Krabbé	Comedy	West German-Dutch co-production
Prüfung eines Lehrers	Eberhard Itzenplitz	Richard Münch, Christine Ostermayer, Doris Schade, Christian Doermer	Drama	
Quartett im Bett	Ulrich Schamoni	Insterburg & Co. (with Karl Dall), Jacob Sisters, Andrea Rau, Rainer Basedow, Werner Finck	Comedy	
Radhapura – Endstation der Verdammten	Hans Albin, Paolo Bianchini	George Nader, Carl Möhner, Gordon Mitchell	Adventure	West German-Italian co-production
Rebus	Nino Zanchin	Ann-Margret, Laurence Harvey, Ivan Desny, Camilla Horn	Crime	a.k.a. Appointment in Beirut. Italian-Spanish-West German co-production
Der Reformator	Rudolf Jugert	Christian Rode, Hermann Schomberg, Ernst Fritz Fürbringer, Lukas Ammann, Dieter Borsche, Andrea Dahmen	Biography	a.k.a. Der Reformator – Martin Luther
Die Reisegesellschaft	Eberhard Itzenplitz	Anna Tardi, Walter Rilla, Gisela Trowe, Herbert Fleischmann, Heinz Schubert, Elisabeth Wiedemann, Herbert Bötticher	Drama, War	a.k.a. Boule de Suif
Richard II	Franz Josef Wild	Hannes Messemer, Ernst Fritz Fürbringer, Paul Verhoeven, Uta Sax, Marianne Hoppe, Hellmut Lange, Gerhard Riedmann	Drama	
Romeo und Jeanette	Karl Peter Biltz	Monika Peitsch, Knut Hinz	Drama	a.k.a. Romeo & Jeanette
Sabina Englender	Rainer Wolffhardt	Karin Anselm	Drama	
Ein Sarg für Mr. Holloway	Harald Vock	Eric Pohlmann, Uwe Friedrichsen, Wolfgang Völz, Katrin Schaake, Günther Neutze, Friedrich Joloff	Crime	
Schichtwechsel	Hans Dieter Schwarze	Klaus Grünberg, Hermann Günther, Angela Winkler	Drama	
Schinderhannes	Franz Peter Wirth	Hans Dieter Zeidler	Adventure	
Schloß in den Wolken	Michael Kehlmann	Ernst Stankovski, Stefan Behrens, Ursula Schult, Kitty Speiser	Comedy	
Die schwarze Sonne	Falk Harnack	Friedhelm Ptok, Christine Ostermayer	War	
Der Senator	Günter Gräwert	Siegfried Wischnewski, Dieter Borsche, Eric Pohlmann, Claus Holm	Docudrama	a.k.a. Der Senator – Joseph McCarthy
Separate Tables	Franz Josef Wild	Elfriede Kuzmany, Günther Ungeheuer	Drama	a.k.a. An Einzeltischen
Septembergewitter	Rainer Wolffhardt	Martin Lüttge, Ulli Lommel, Eva Brumby, Renate Grosser, Tilli Breidenbach	Drama	a.k.a. September Storm
The Shooting Party	Gerhard Klingenberg	Karin Baal, Erich Schellow, Heinrich Schweiger, Hermann Schomberg, Andrea Jonasson	Drama	a.k.a. Tragödie auf der Jagd
Sich selbst der Nächste	Michael Kehlmann	Eva Katharina Schultz, Alexander Kerst	Drama	a.k.a. Are You by Yourself?
Signs of Life	Werner Herzog	Peter Brogle, Wolfgang Reichmann	Drama, War	Won the Jury Grand Prix at Berlin
Sin with a Discount	Rudolf Lubowski	Claus Holm, Rolf Wanka, Adrian Hoven	Crime	
Sir Roger Casement	Hermann Kugelstadt	Heinz Weiss	History, Biography	
Der Snob	Hans Schweikart	Heinz Drache, Brigitte Grothum, Hans Caninenberg, Werner Hinz, Louise Martini	Comedy	
So eine Liebe	Jiří Bělka	Monika Peitsch, Bruno Dietrich, Wolfgang Liebeneiner	Drama	a.k.a. That Kind of Love
So Much Naked Tenderness	Günter Hendel	Erika Remberg, Doris Arden	Crime	
Der Sog	Theo Mezger	Edith Schultze-Westrum, Peter Ehrlich	Drama	
Die Söhne	Volker Vogeler	Rolf Becker, Wolfgang Forester, Hans-Joachim Schmiedel, Heidi Stroh, Walter Kohut, Willy Semmelrogge	Drama	
Staatsexamen	Hellmuth Matiasek	Bruno Dietrich, Donata Höffer, Alf Marholm, Jutta Lampe, Wolfram Weniger, Hartmut Becker	Drama	a.k.a. Farewell in June
Die Stimme im Glas	Wolf Vollmar	Günther Lüders, Louise Martini, Günther Jerschke	Fantasy	a.k.a. La voce nel bicchiere
The Story of Vasco	Heinz Schirk	Horst Bollmann, Heidelinde Weis, Werner Hinz, Christian Wolff, Rudolf Forster	Drama, War	
Street Acquaintances of St. Pauli	Werner Klingler	Rainer Brandt, Reinhard Kolldehoff, Dagmar Lassander, Günther Stoll	Crime	
Succubus	Jesús Franco	Janine Reynaud, Jack Taylor, Howard Vernon	Horror	
Sugar Bread and Whip	Marran Gosov	Helga Anders, Roger Fritz, Harald Leipnitz, Monika Lundi	Crime	
Summer of the Seventeenth Doll	Korbinian Köberle	Siegfried Wischnewski, Herbert Fleischmann, Hannelore Schroth, Rosl Schäfer, Christiane Schröder, Lucie Mannheim	Drama	a.k.a. Summer of the 17th Doll
The Sweet Time of Kalimagdora	Leopold Lahola	Rüdiger Bahr, Monika Zinnenberg, Gisela Hahn, Magda Vásáryová	Fantasy	
Take Off Your Clothes, Doll	Ákos Ráthonyi	Astrid Frank, Elisabeth Volkmann, Anke Syring, Christiane Rücker, Christine Schuberth	Drama	
Tamara	Hansjürgen Pohland	Petrus Schloemp, Wolfgang Preiss, Barbara Rütting	Crime	
Tea Party	Rainer Wolffhardt	Max Eckard, Ingrid Andree	Drama	
The Tenth Man	Ludwig Cremer	Ulli Philipp, Michael Degen, Leonard Steckel, Walter Rilla, Alfred Balthoff	Drama	a.k.a. The 10th Man
They Came to Rob Las Vegas	Antonio Isasi-Isasmendi	Gary Lockwood, Elke Sommer, Lee J. Cobb, Jack Palance	Crime thriller	Spanish-Italian-French-West German co-production
This Thing Called Love	Walter Kausch	Claus Biederstaedt, Gerlinde Locker, Robert Meyn, Gunnar Möller	Comedy	a.k.a. Was man so die Liebe nennt
This Woman for Example	Heinz von Cramer	Erika Pluhar, Miriam Spoerri, Gunther Malzacher, Claus Biederstaedt	Drama	a.k.a. Destroy, She Said
Till the Happy End	Theodor Kotulla	Klaus Löwitsch, Beatrix Ost, Roger Fritz, Helga Sommerfeld	Drama	a.k.a. Until the Happy End
Tod für bunte Laternen	Edward Rothe	Luitgard Im, Udo Vioff, Hubert Suschka	Drama	
Tower of Screaming Virgins	Franz Antel	Teri Tordai, Jean Piat, Uschi Glas, Véronique Vendell, Jacques Herlin	Drama	West German-French-Italian co-production
Tramp	Peter Lilienthal	Vadim Glowna, Franciszek Pieczka	Drama	a.k.a. Tramp or The Only and Incomparable Lenny Jacobsen
The Tukhachevsky Case	Rudolf Jugert	Helmut Wildt, Paul Edwin Roth, Pinkas Braun	Docudrama	a.k.a. Der Fall Tuchatschewskij
Twelfth Night	Ludwig Cremer	Johanna von Koczian, Erika Pluhar, Martin Benrath, Theo Lingen	Comedy	
Die Unbekannte aus der Seine	Michael Kehlmann	Walter Kohut, Hertha Martin, Eric Pohlmann, Hans Clarin	Drama	
Der Unbestechliche	Gerhard Klingenberg	Ernst Stankovski, Loni von Friedl, Romuald Pekny, Ida Ehre	Comedy	
Under Two Dictators	Paul May	Margot Trooger, Andrea Dahmen, Lis Verhoeven	War, Biography	a.k.a. Prisoner of Stalin and Hitler
Der Urlaub	Herbert Ballmann	Stefan Behrens, Benno Sterzenbach	Drama	
The Valley of Death	Harald Reinl	Lex Barker, Pierre Brice, Karin Dor, Rik Battaglia, Ralf Wolter	Western	Based on Karl May. West German-Yugoslav co-production
Das Veilchen	Wolfgang Glück	Fritz Schulz, Elfriede Kuzmany	Comedy	a.k.a. The Violet
Versetzung	Tom Toelle	Heinz Meier, Alexander May, Ralf Gregan, Eva Brumby	Drama	
Vier Stunden von Elbe 1	Eberhard Fechner	Helga Feddersen, Carsta Löck, Klaus Höhne	Drama	
A Village Romeo and Juliet	Willi Schmidt	Loni von Friedl, Matthias Fuchs, Carl Lange	Drama	a.k.a. Romeo und Julia auf dem Dorfe
Warum ist Frau B. glücklich?	Erika Runge		Documentary	
Wenn die kleinen Veilchen blühen	Hermann Lanske	Johannes Heesters, Theo Lingen, Thomas Fritsch, Peter Kraus, Marianne Schönauer	Musical	a.k.a. Wild Violets a.k.a. When the Little Violets Bloom. West German-Austrian co-production
Wie ein Hirschberger Dänisch lernte	Rolf Busch	Josef Schaper, Bertel Lauring, Lars Lunøe, Erik Paaske, Emil Hass Christensen, Ebba With, Povl Wøldike, Karen Lykkehus, Tove Bang, Rigmor Hvidtfeldt, Arthur Jensen, Ove Sprogøe, Lene Tiemroth	Drama, War	
Die Wilde	Gerhard Klingenberg	Cornelia Froboess	Drama	a.k.a. La Sauvage
With Oak Leaves and Fig Leaf	Franz-Josef Spieker	Werner Enke, Eric Pohlmann, Birke Bruck, Rainer Basedow	Comedy	
Wo man sich trifft	Thomas Fantl	Karin Hübner, Christiane Krüger, Heinz Peter Scholz, Paul Neuhaus, Rolf Zacher	Drama	
Zeit der halben Herzen	Peter Beauvais	Karl Michael Vogler, Nicole Heesters	Drama	a.k.a. A Cold Heart
Zu Hause	Karl Heinz Deickert	Dorothea Wieck, Günter Strack, Liane Hielscher	Drama	
Zum Teufel mit der Penne	Werner Jacobs	Hansi Kraus, Theo Lingen, Rudolf Schündler, Peter Alexander, Heintje	Comedy	Die Lümmel von der ersten Bank film series
Zur Hölle mit den Paukern	Werner Jacobs	Hansi Kraus, Theo Lingen, Rudolf Schündler, Georg Thomalla, Uschi Glas	Comedy	Die Lümmel von der ersten Bank film series

== See also ==
- List of Austrian films of 1968
- List of East German films of 1968

== Bibliography ==
- Bergfelder, Tim. International Adventures: German Popular Cinema and European Co-Productions in the 1960s. Berghahn Books, 2005.
