= Dead Body on Broadway =

1969 film

- Directed by: Harald Reinl
- Written by: Rolf Schulz; Christa Stern
- Produced by: Heinz Willeg
- Starring: George Nader; Heinz Weiss; Heidy Bohlen
- Cinematography: Heinz Hölscher
- Edited by: Gisela Haller
- Music by: Peter Thomas
- Production companies: Allianz Filmproduktion; Terra Film
- Distributed by: Constantin Film
- Release date: 26 March 1969
- Running time: 89 minutes
- Country: West Germany
- Language: German

Dead Body on Broadway (German: Todesschüsse am Broadway) is a 1969 German thriller film directed by Harald Reinl and starring George Nader, Heinz Weiss and Heidy Bohlen. It is the final entry in the series of films portraying FBI agent Jerry Cotton.

The film's sets were designed by the art director Ernst H. Albrecht. It was shot at the Tempelhof Studios in Berlin.

== Plot ==
Cotton is called in to investigate a crime on Broadway because an FBI agent has died while working undercover. Before his demise he concealed the booty from a recent huge robbery in an unknown location. All of the culprits are arrested by the FBI but the main villain, Costello, is soon broken free by a hitherto rivaling gang. His new accomplices presume he knows the location of the booty and he tries to live up to their expectations. The demised agent's girlfriend, Cindy, realizes she needs protection. Jerry Cotton obliges and stops at nothing to catch Costello.

== Cast ==
- George Nader as Jerry Cotton
- Heinz Weiss as Phil Decker
- Heidy Bohlen as Cindy Holden
- Miha Baloh as Joe Costello
- Michaela May as Alice Davis
- Horst Naumann as Woody Davis
- Konrad Georg as Mr. Ross
- Herbert Fux as Butler Robin
- Manfred Reddemann as Hairy
- Karl-Heinz Thomas as Dick
- Ulli Kinalzik as Freddy

== Bibliography ==
- Blake, Matt; Deal, David (2004). The Eurospy Guide. Baltimore: Luminary Press. ISBN 978-1-887664-52-3.
