= The Trap Snaps Shut at Midnight =

1966 film

- Directed by: Harald Philipp
- Written by: Fred Denger; Kurt Nachmann
- Produced by: Heinz Willeg
- Starring: George Nader; Horst Frank; Heinz Weiss
- Cinematography: Helmut Meewes
- Edited by: Alfred Srp
- Music by: Peter Thomas
- Production companies: Allianz Filmproduktion; Constantin Film
- Distributed by: Constantin Film
- Release date: 4 March 1966
- Running time: 85 minutes
- Country: West Germany
- Language: German

The Trap Snaps Shut at Midnight (German: Um Null Uhr schnappt die Falle zu) is a 1966 West German thriller film directed by Harald Philipp and starring George Nader, Horst Frank and Heinz Weiss. It is the fourth film in the Jerry Cotton series.

== Plot ==
A truck delivering nitroglycerin is turned away from a mining area when an accident occurs. Two criminals, Lew Hutton and Fat Krusky, are waiting at a local diner to steal the truck, believing it to be empty. Hutton pulls over because the truck is driving sluggishly, and when the find the canisters of nitroglycerin, Krusky runs off. Later, Hutton uses the truck in Manhattan for a bogus accident which is a cover for a jewelry store robbery, committed by his accomplice, Maureen. The NYPD cordons off the area because of the warning notices on the truck, but when the head of the chemical company that owns the truck, Dr. Smeat, arrives, they discover the 20 canisters of nitroglycerin have been removed. The NYPD decides to call in the FBI. Jerry Cotton is called assigned to the case, but suggests to the department chief, Mr. High, that Phil Decker be placed in charge of the investigation. They are told by Dr. Smeat that the nitroglycerin must be kept cool, and that it's packed in ice, but they only have about 30 hours before it becomes unstable.

The gangster Larry Link hears about the robbery and has Krusky tortured, but without getting any information. Maureen appears at Link's headquarters and offers to help him find the nitroglycerin for payment. Maureen tells Link that Hutton got his information about where to hijack the truck from Dr. Smeat's secretary, Ruth Warren. Link sends his goons to Ruth's apartment to find out where Hutton is hiding. Cotton and Decker discover the connection between Warren and Hutton, and go to interview Warren. They find her being held by Link's men, and a fight ensues. Freed, Warren tells Cotton and Decker where to find Hutton: at his mother's pinball arcade.

Cotton promises Hutton protection from Link if he surrenders the canisters. Hutton agrees but Link and his men are already at the hiding place, and Cotton is knocked out. When Cotton comes to, Hutton is dead and Link is in possession of the nitroglycerin. Link then informs the FBI he wants one million dollars for the canisters, otherwise he will let one of them explode somewhere in Manhattan. He calls a NYC newspaper with the information about the missing nitroglycerin to put pressure on the government and embarrass the FBI. This causes a panic in Manhattan.

Cotton trails one of Link's henchmen and discovers they have one of the canisters hanging from The Manhattan Bridge. He manages to stop the goon from setting off the nitroglycerin. Dr. Smeat shows up to help cool down the canister.

Link decides to kidnap Dr. Smeat to pressure the FBI further. The FBI decides to pay the ransom as a trap. A briefcase containing the money is handed over to Maureen, who escapes in a taxi. She takes the money to Link's accomplices, while Link stays with the canisters and maintains contact over the radio. Link hears radio interference and has his men search the briefcase. When they find the tracking device, Cotton and Decker bust in. Link hears this over his radio and decides to set off the nitroglycerin, but Dr. Smeat yells their location (the Pennsylvania Express) over the radio to Cotton before Link can knock Dr. Smeat out. Cotton races to the railway and is able to kill Link before time is up. The FBI countdown clock stops at 0:07 minutes before the canisters get too warm.

Jerry is granted a well-deserved vacation, but his boss has him called out over the airport's PA system because of another urgent case.

== Cast ==
- George Nader as Jerry Cotton
- Horst Frank as Larry Link
- Heinz Weiss as Phil Decker
- Richard Münch as Mr. High
- Dominique Wilms as Maureen
- Allen Pinson as Harry
- Alexander Allerson as Husky
- Monika Grimm as Ruth Warren
- Helga Schlack as Helen Culver
- Ricky Cooper as Pal
- Werner Abrolat as Krot

== Bibliography ==
- Blake, Matt; Deal, David (2004). The Eurospy Guide. Baltimore: Luminary Press. ISBN 978-1-887664-52-3.
