= Jerry Cotton (film) =

2010 film

- Directed by: Philipp Stennert; Cyrill Boss
- Starring: Christian Tramitz; Christian Ulmen; Mónica Cruz
- Release date: 2010
- Country: Germany
- Language: German

Logo

Jerry Cotton is a 2010 German action comedy film directed by Philipp Stennert and Cyrill Boss and starring Christian Tramitz, Christian Ulmen and Mónica Cruz. It is a reboot of the Jerry Cotton series of films. FBI agent Jerry Cotton fights crime in New York City. On December 17 and 26 2012 it was shown on HBO Asia in Original German language with English subtitles.

== Plot ==
In NYC, FBI agent and workaholic Jerry Cotton is in a warehouse, restrained with chains on a conveyer belt and rolling toward an industrial pound cutter, while his partner is tied up and suspended upside down from the high ceiling. They had previously tracked down a gang that had kidnapped a financier's young daughter. Cotton is able to cut the chains with the cutter, take down most of the gang, and save the girl from a fall from a catwalk, but his partner crashes down to the ground. Even though he hasn't slept for over 49 hours, he drops by a crime scene on his way home to sleep. A man was found shot dead in the waterbed of a luxury apartment, and Jerry recognizes the dead man as his old adversary Sammy Serrano. Serrano was an important figure in the New York underworld and outsourced many jobs to third parties, which meant that he himself remained unrecognized - which is why he was called the Puppet Master . Cotton pursued him years ago because of a famous heist known as the United States Union Gold Robbery, but the charges were dismissed due to lack of evidence. It was the only case Cotton lost.

Interested in solving the puppeteer murder quickly, Cotton follows a lead to the Cristallo bar. Unfortunately, he cannot investigate in his usual lone wolf style because the head of the department, Mr. High, assigns a new colleague, Phil Decker. Decker is an untalented newbie, fresh from the Academy, and is an immature fan of Jerry Cotton. But Decker's father is a senator, so High has little choice. Decker proceeds to create an elaborate and subtle plan to infiltrate the Cristallo, which Cotton proceeds to ignore. Now without 72 hours sleep, Cotton befriends the female member of the gang, Malena, and manages to gain the trust of a gang of gangsters led by the German-born gangster boss Klaus Schmidt. Cotton is then entrusted with an important courier service. But this soon turns out to be a trap - the address is his injured past partner's apartment. Cotton arrives just as his former partner fall from the window onto an FBI SUV parked below. Cotton is seen by the arriving agents and ends up being the main suspect in his former partner's murder, with a fake file in the apartment that shows Cotton suspected of murdering Sammy Serrano.

The FBI brings in a female internal investigator, a former partner of Cotton's named Daryl Zanuck, who is convinced Cotton is guilty. The entire FBI, especially its boss Mr. High and the internal affairs investigator Daryl Zanuck, turn against Jerry Cotton and search the city for him. Decker suspects Cotton in innocent, but he's immediately put on suspension by High. Cotton sees one of the gang leaving the Cristallo and follows her to the Hotel Alabama. Cotton tries to find out from the front desk about who in the gang is checked in, but the desk clerk sees Cotton's wanted poster faxed to the hotel and tries to shoot Cotton with a shotgun.

Now without 105 hours sleep, Cotton begins to lose confidence and he seeks help from Phil Decker, who is about to leave the FBI office. Phil Decker sees a chance to redeem himself and help the FBI investigate. Decker helps Cotton infiltrate the Hotel Alabama by dressing himself in an atrocious disguise of a fake Asian lounge singer, with Cotton hidden in a travel trunk. Zanuck arrives with her people before Decker and Cotton get to the elevator and, suspecting something, confronts Decker - as she leans against the trunk. Decker launches into a terrible rendition of "Stop! In the Name of Love". This convinces Zanuck that Decker is actually a bad entertainer.

Cotton and Decker are checked into the room next to the gang and run surveillance with a bug planted in the room. They discover the gang is plotting a heist code-named "Baby Jane." They are preparing to follow the gang when Zanuck and her crew arrive, having realized Decker was the lounge singer and had smuggled Cotton into the hotel. A gunfight ensues in the hotel stairway, and when Cotton and Decker are about to be handcuffed, Cotton grabs a housekeeping laundry cart filled with pillows, pushes it through the bannister, then grabs Decker and jumps. Cotton and Decker follow the cart eight floors down, their fall broken by the pillows.

Cotton is now without 112 hours sleep. He and Decker are able to follow the gang to a bar known also as "The Dead End" because paroled felons frequent there - many having been arrested by Cotton. They narrowly escape pursuing parolees bent on revenge and discover the gang is about to execute Malena, accusing her of leading Cotton to them. Cotton and Decker are also captured, and as they are about to be shot by dozens of parolees, Cotton distracts them enough for Malena slip aside and to shut off the lights. Cotton and Decker escape, with the parolees hot on their trail, until they are able to trick the bad guys into shooting up two mannequins disguised as them. The mannequins fall out a window into a garbage truck below, making the parolees think Cotton is finally dead.

Walking down a dark alley in their underwear, a red 1967 Jaguar drives up to them quickly. It's Malena, seeking Cotton's help so she can get her share of the loot from the heist in exchange for leading Cotton and Decker to the gang. Without her, the gang needs an alarm expert, and there's only one other available as good as her - a Ukrainian named Vasily Doronjovsky. The three subdue Doronjovsky and Decker creates a disguise to look like the Ukrainian. Decker then joins the gang disguised as Doronjovsky with an earpiece so Malena can talk him through cracking the alarm system. The gang - with Cotton and Malena following - travel down tunnels under the NY Port Authority customs storage. After they gain entry once Decker shuts down the alarm, they proceed to a bricked up part of the tunnel. One of the gang sprays chemicals on the bricks . . . and they turn out to be the gold blocks from the United States Union Gold Robbery, previously hidden by Serrano.

Malena tricks Cotton, now without 118 hours sleep, by handcuffing him to a pipe so she can get her share of the gold. After loading the gold into trunks of cars already cleared by customs for the late Serrano, the gang discover Decker is in disguise. But as they are about to shoot him, gun fire rings out as Decker is saved by Malena.

Malena gets away and, after getting out of the handcuffs, Cotton joins Decker in the customs warehouse where they find the dead gang piled into the back of a Rolls-Royce. Someone starts shooting at them, and taking cover behind a statue podium, they discover that Zanuck has been the one who murdered the Serrano and taken over his position as the puppet master. This allowed her to frame Cotton, secretly complete Serrano's plan, and get her hands on the stolen gold.

Trapped, Cotton and Decker finally work together as a team and are able to take down Zanuck through coordination. The story ends with Cotton rehabilitated, and he and Decker full partners, although Decker is still clearly untalented.

== Cast ==
- Christian Tramitz as Jerry Cotton
- Christian Ulmen as Phil Decker / Wasilij
- Mónica Cruz as Malena
- Christiane Paul as Daryl D. Zanuck
- Heino Ferch as Klaus Schmidt
- Joram Voelklein as Johnny Rocco
- Jürgen Tarrach as Ruby
- Jaymes Butler as Sunny Dollar
- Janek Rieke as Ted Conroy
- Herbert Knaup as Mr. High
- Moritz Bleibtreu as Sammy Serrano
- Manou Lubowski as Steve Dillaggio
- Tim Sikyea as Zerookaah
- Lara-Isabelle Rentinck as June Clark
- Anna Julia Kapfelsperger as Peggy Martin
- Günther Kaufmann as Joe Brandenburg

== Production ==
With the success of the OSS 117 spoofs starring Jean Dujardin, such as OSS 117: Cairo, Nest of Spies, German directors Philipp Stennert and Cyrill Boss decided to resurrect Germany's 1960's thriller hero Jerry Cotton in a similar satire.

Unlike OSS 117, this film moves the Bastei Lübbe character to modern times. Nevertheless, the film contains various allusions and cross-references to the originals. For example, the red Jaguar E-Type makes an appearance, Cotton uses his original Smith & Wesson revolver, and numerous names from the original films and paperback novels are used (such as Steve Dillaggio, John Flybert, and Joe Brandenburg).

The Cristallo bar, where Jerry Cotton goes undercover, appears in the second Cotton film, Manhattan Night of Murder (1965), as the bowling alley of a criminal named Christallo . In Mr. High's office there is also a picture of George Nader, the American star of the sixties film series. Jerry's new Jaguar XKR has the license plate JC 1954 - the year in which the first novel was published. The original "Jerry Cotton March" by Peter Thomas can also be heard in several scenes.

Just like the original films from the sixties, Jerry Cotton was shot in Berlin and Hamburg. Stylized New York skylines and the New York Harbor were created using CGI. Only the helicopter flights over the city and various car rides were shot at original locations in New York.

The name of the head of the FBI supervisory authority, Daryl Zanuck, is a reference to the film producer and screenwriter Darryl F. Zanuck.
