= Franz Xaver Lederle =

German cinematographer

- Born: 18 February 1931; Mindelheim, Bavaria, Germany
- Other name: Franz X. Lederle
- Occupation: Cinematographer
- Years active: 1957–2008 (film & TV)

Franz Xaver Lederle (born 1931) is a German cinematographer. He shot several entries in the Jerry Cotton series of films for Constantin Film during the 1960s.

== Selected filmography ==
- The Puzzle of the Red Orchid (1962)
- The World Revolves Around You (1964)
- The Fountain of Love (1966)
- Die Rechnung – eiskalt serviert (1966)
- Murderers Club of Brooklyn (1967)
- When Night Falls on the Reeperbahn (1967)
- Death and Diamonds (1968)
- Succubus (1968)
- Death in the Red Jaguar (1968)
- The Doctor of St. Pauli (1968)
- When Sweet Moonlight Is Sleeping in the Hills (1969)
- That Can't Shake Our Willi! (1970)
- The Priest of St. Pauli (1970)
- Rudi, Behave! (1971)
- Bloody Friday (1972)
- Cry of the Black Wolves (1972)
- Trouble with Trixie (1972)
- Old Barge, Young Love (1973)
- No Gold for a Dead Diver (1974)
- Three Bavarians in Bangkok (1976)
- Vanessa (1977)
- Three Swedes in Upper Bavaria (1977)
- Love Hotel in Tyrol (1978)
- She's 19 and Ready (1979)
- Cola, Candy, Chocolate (1979)
- Starke Zeiten (1988)
- Hochwürden erbt das Paradies (1993, TV film)

== Bibliography ==
- Bergfelder, Tim (2005) [2004]. International Adventures: German Popular Cinema and European Co-Productions in the 1960s. New York: Berghahn Books. ISBN 978-1-57181-539-2.
