= The Priest of St. Pauli =

1970 film

- German film poster
- German: Der Pfarrer von St. Pauli
- Directed by: Rolf Olsen
- Written by: Rolf Olsen
- Produced by: Heinz Willeg
- Starring: Curd Jürgens; Heinz Reincke; Corny Collins
- Cinematography: Franz Xaver Lederle
- Edited by: Renate Willeg
- Music by: Erwin Halletz
- Production companies: Allianz Filmproduktion; Terra Film
- Distributed by: Constantin Film
- Release date: 18 August 1970
- Running time: 103 minutes
- Country: West Germany
- Language: German

The Priest of St. Pauli (German: Der Pfarrer von St. Pauli) is a 1970 West German drama film directed by Rolf Olsen and starring Curd Jürgens. Two years earlier they had made the similarly-themed The Doctor of St. Pauli together.

== Plot ==
A former submarine commander turned priest tends to the inhabitants of St. Pauli, the red light district of Hamburg.

== Cast ==
- Curd Jürgens as Pfarrer Konrad Johannsen
- Heinz Reincke as Titus Kleinwiehe, Messner
- Barbara Lass as Dagmar
- Corny Collins as Ingrid Brahms
- Dieter Borsche as Pastor Tönning
- Günther Stoll as Barbesitzer Heino Docke
- Horst Naumann as Willy Krekel
- Carl Lange as Monsignore
- Werner Bruhns as Clemens Bossum, Detective Chief Inspector
- Walter Buschhoff as Importeur Carl Ostro
- Hans Hessling as Dr. Paul Meerkatz
- Christian Engelmann as Jörg Ostro
- Christine Diersch as Hilde Leonhard, friend of Jörg Ostro
- Georg Hartmann as Jan Poppenbüll, mayor
- Helga Feddersen as Tine Poppenbüll
- Klaus-Hagen Latwesen as Holger Rudbool
- Jean-Pierre Bonin as Luigi Moretti
- Jürgen Lier as Mario Scala
- Ilse Peternell as Solveig
- Wolfgang Condrus as Holger
