= Heinz Willeg =

German film producer (1918–1991)

- Born: 16 September 1918; Berlin, German Empire
- Died: 13 February 1991 (aged 72); Luneburg, Lower Saxony, Germany
- Occupation: Producer
- Years active: 1949–1987 (film)

Heinz Willeg (September 16, 1918 – February 13, 1991) was a German film producer. During the 1960s he produced a number of crime and thriller films including the Jerry Cotton series starring George Nader.

== Selected filmography ==
- The Bird Seller (1953)
- On the Reeperbahn at Half Past Midnight (1954)
- Love Is Forever (1954)
- The Happy Village (1955)
- Charley's Aunt (1956)
- Vater sein dagegen sehr (1957)
- Spring in Berlin (1957)
- Black Forest Cherry Schnapps (1958)
- Peter Voss, Thief of Millions (1958)
- The Copper (1958)
- Two Hearts in May (1958)
- The Muzzle (1958)
- Roses for the Prosecutor (1959)
- When the Heath Is in Bloom (1960)
- The Young Sinner (1960)
- The Avenger (1960)
- The Last Witness (1960)
- Three Men in a Boat (1961)
- The Gypsy Baron (1962)
- The Threepenny Opera (1963)
- The Monster of London City (1964)
- The Shoot (1964)
- The Phantom of Soho (1964)
- The Last Tomahawk (1965)
- Tread Softly (1965)
- Manhattan Night of Murder (1965)
- The Trap Snaps Shut at Midnight (1966)
- Die Rechnung – eiskalt serviert (1966)
- Murderers Club of Brooklyn (1967)
- When Night Falls on the Reeperbahn (1967)
- Death and Diamonds (1968)
- Death in the Red Jaguar (1968)
- Dead Body on Broadway (1969)
- Charley's Uncle (1969)
- On the Reeperbahn at Half Past Midnight (1969)
- That Can't Shake Our Willi! (1970)
- The Priest of St. Pauli (1970)
- Hotel by the Hour (1970)
- Jailbreak in Hamburg (1971)
- Twenty Girls and the Teachers (1971)
- The Heath Is Green (1972)

== Bibliography ==
- Peter Cowie & Derek Elley. World Filmography: 1967. Fairleigh Dickinson University Press, 1977.
