= The Puzzle of the Red Orchid =

1962 film

- Film poster
- Directed by: Helmut Ashley
- Written by: Edgar Wallace; Egon Eis
- Produced by: Horst Wendlandt
- Starring: Christopher Lee; Adrian Hoven; Marisa Mell
- Cinematography: Franz Xaver Lederle
- Edited by: Herbert Taschner
- Music by: Peter Thomas
- Production company: Rialto Film
- Distributed by: Constantin Film
- Release date: 1 March 1962
- Running time: 84 minutes
- Country: West Germany
- Language: German

The Puzzle of the Red Orchid (German: Das Rätsel der roten Orchidee, also known as The Secret of the Red Orchid) is a 1962 West German black-and-white crime film directed by Helmut Ashley and starring Christopher Lee, Adrian Hoven, and Marisa Mell.

The film was part of Rialto Film's long-running series of Edgar Wallace adaptations. It was made at the Wandsbek Studios in Hamburg with location shooting in London and around the harbor at Cuxhaven.

== Cast ==
- Christopher Lee as Captain Allerman
- Adrian Hoven as Inspector Weston
- Marisa Mell as Lilian Ranger
- Pinkas Braun as Edwin
- Christiane Nielsen as Cora Minelli
- Eric Pohlmann as Kerkie Minelli
- Fritz Rasp as Tanner
- Wolfgang Büttner as Chief Inspector Tetley
- Herbert A.E. Böhme as Oberst Drood
- Günther Jerschke as Mr. Shelby
- Sigrid von Richthofen as Mrs. Moore
- Hans Paetsch as Lord Arlington
- Edgar Wenzel as Babyface
- Klaus Kinski as Steve
- Eddi Arent as Parker

== Reception ==
The FSK gave the film a rating of "12 and older" and found it not appropriate for screenings on public holidays. The film went on mass release on 1 March 1962.
