= Die Rechnung – eiskalt serviert =

1966 film

Tip Not Included
- German: Die Rechnung – eiskalt serviert
- Directed by: Helmut Ashley
- Written by: George Hurdalek
- Produced by: Heinz Willeg
- Starring: George Nader; Yvonne Monlaur; Heinz Weiss
- Cinematography: Franz Xaver Lederle
- Edited by: Alfred Srp
- Music by: Peter Thomas
- Production companies: Allianz Filmproduktion; Constantin Film
- Distributed by: Constantin Film
- Release date: 25 August 1966
- Running time: 85 minutes
- Country: West Germany
- Language: German

Die Rechnung – eiskalt serviert, or Tip Not Included in English, is a 1966 West German thriller film directed by Helmut Ashley and starring George Nader, Yvonne Monlaur, and Heinz Weiss. It is the fourth film in the Jerry Cotton series.

== Plot ==
An elaborate bank robbery takes place and the gangsters succeed although the FBI had been warned. The bank president dies of a heart attack. Jerry Cotton, who is considered accountable for this major failure, loses his badge over this. Being the man he is, Cotton doesn't let the evil-doers forget that he has unfinished business with them. He catches even the last one although he must jump onto a flying helicopter in order to get him.

== Cast ==
- George Nader as Jerry Cotton
- Heinz Weiss as Phil Decker
- Richard Münch as Mr. High
- Yvonne Monlaur as Violet
- Horst Tappert as Charles Anderson
- Ullrich Haupt as George Davis
- Walter Rilla as John M. Clark
- Helga Schlack as Helen
- Christian Doermer as Tommy Wheeler
- Birke Bruck as Mary
- Arthur Brauss as Billiboy
- Axel Scholtz as Happy
- Ilija Ivezić as Caruso
- Rainer Brandt as Stanley

== Bibliography ==
- Blake, Matt; Deal, David (2004). The Eurospy Guide. Baltimore: Luminary Press. ISBN 978-1-887664-52-3.
