= Death in the Red Jaguar =

1968 film

- German film poster
- German: Der Tod im roten Jaguar
- Directed by: Harald Reinl
- Screenplay by: Herbert Reinecker
- Based on: Jerry Cotton
- Produced by: Heinz Willeg
- Starring: George Nader; Heinz Weiss; Grit Boettcher
- Cinematography: Franz Xaver Lederle
- Edited by: Hermann Haller
- Music by: Peter Thomas
- Production companies: Constantin Film; Allianz Film; Cineproduzioni Associate S.r.l.
- Distributed by: Constantin Film
- Release date: 15 August 1968 (West Germany)
- Running time: 91 minutes
- Countries: West Germany; Italy

Death in the Red Jaguar (German: Der Tod im roten Jaguar) is a 1968 West German thriller film directed by Harald Reinl and starring George Nader, Heinz Weiss, and Daniela Surina. It is the sixth in the Jerry Cotton series of films.

It was shot at the Tempelhof Studios in Berlin and on location in San Francisco. The film's sets were designed by the art director Ernst H. Albrecht.

== Plot ==
The FBI agent tackles an organization of assassins who kill to order.

== Cast ==
- George Nader as Jerry Cotton
- Heinz Weiss as Phil Decker
- Daniela Surina as Ria Payne
- Friedrich Schütter as Mr. Clark
- Carl Lange as Dr. Saunders
- Giuliano Raffaelli as Francis Gordon
- Herbert Stass as Sam Parker
- Grit Boettcher as Linda Carp
- Gert Haucke as Kit Davis
- Karin Schröder as Ann Gordon
- Kurt Jaggberg as Peter Carp
- Robert Fuller as Charlie

== Release ==
Death in the Red Jaguar was released in West Germany on 15 August 1968.
