= Friedrich Schütter =

German actor (1921–1995)

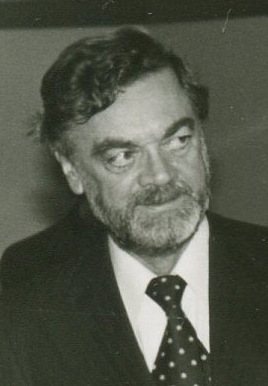
- Born: 4 January 1921; Düsseldorf, Germany
- Died: 17 September 1995 (aged 74); Hamburg, Germany
- Occupation(s): Film actor Television actor
- Years active: 1954–1994
- Relatives: David Schütter (grandson)

Friedrich Schütter (1921–1995) was a German film and television actor. He was the German dubbing voice of Lorne Greene.

== Selected filmography ==
- Operation Sleeping Bag (1955)
- The Heart of St. Pauli (1957)
- Doctor Crippen Lives (1958)
- The Crimson Circle (1960)
- The Counterfeit Traitor (1962)
- When Night Falls on the Reeperbahn (1967)
- Death in the Red Jaguar (1968)
- The Doctor of St. Pauli (1968)
- On the Reeperbahn at Half Past Midnight (1969)
- Das Millionenspiel (1970)
- Tatort: Reifezeugnis (1979)

== Television appearances ==
- Maximilian von Mexiko
- Sir Roger Casement
