= Escape to Berlin =

1961 film

- Directed by: Will Tremper
- Written by: Will Tremper
- Based on: Komm mit nach Berlin by Will Tremper
- Produced by: Will Tremper
- Starring: Christian Doermer; Susanne Korda; Narziss Sokatscheff
- Cinematography: Günter Haase; Gerd von Bonin
- Edited by: Will Tremper
- Music by: Peter Thomas
- Production companies: Stun Film; Will Tremper Filmproduktion
- Distributed by: Constantin Film
- Release date: 17 March 1961
- Running time: 104 minutes
- Country: West Germany
- Language: German

Escape to Berlin (German: Flucht nach Berlin) is a 1961 West German thriller film directed by Will Tremper and starring Christian Doermer, Susanne Korda and Narziss Sokatscheff. Location shooting took place around Wannsee in West Berlin and near to Bad Hersfeld. It was shot just before the construction of the Berlin Wall.

== Synopsis ==
A young farmer living in East Germany unsuccessfully resists programme of collectivisation and then chooses to flee to the democratic West Germany.

== Cast ==
- Christian Doermer as Claus Baade
- Susanne Korda as Doris Lange
- Narziss Sokatscheff as Hermann Gueden
- Ralf Gregan as Streckenwärter der ostzonalen Reichsbahn
- Joe Hembus as Badegast im Strandbad Wannsee
- Reinhold Timm as Vopo auf Motorrad
- Wittigo von Einsiedel as Stasi-Scherge mit Spitzbart

== Bibliography ==
- Bock, Hans-Michael & Bergfelder, Tim. The Concise CineGraph. Encyclopedia of German Cinema. Berghahn Books, 2009.
- Hake, Sabine. German National Cinema. Routledge, 2002.
- Rother, Rainer (ed.) German Film: From the Archives of the Deutsche Kinemathek. Hatje Cantz Verlag, 2024.
