= Manhattan Night of Murder =

1965 film

- Directed by: Harald Philipp
- Written by: Fred Denger; Kurt Nachmann
- Produced by: Heinz Willeg
- Starring: George Nader; Monika Grimm; Heinz Weiss
- Cinematography: Walter Tuch
- Edited by: Alfred Srp
- Music by: Peter Thomas
- Production companies: Allianz Filmproduktion; Constantin Film
- Distributed by: Constantin Film
- Release date: 26 November 1965
- Running time: 91 minutes
- Country: West Germany
- Language: German

Manhattan Night of Murder (German: Mordnacht in Manhattan) is a 1965 German thriller film directed by Harald Philipp and starring George Nader, Heinz Weiss and Monika Grimm. It is the second of the Jerry Cotton series of films, depicting the adventures of an FBI agent.

== Plot ==
A gang of extortionists murder owners of small businesses in case they refuse to pay for protection. After they have killed one of their victims, Jerry Cotton gets assigned to take care of this matter.

== Cast ==
- George Nader as Jerry Cotton
- Heinz Weiss as Phil Decker
- Richard Münch as Mr. High
- Monika Grimm as Sally
- Slobodan Dimitrijevic as Alec Korsky
- Silvia Solar as Wilma de Loy
- Peter Kuiper as Bob
- Siegurd Fitzek as Patrick
- Allen Pinson as Jenkins
- Elke Neidhardt as Sophie Latimore
- Henri Cogan as Bruce
- Willy Semmelrogge as Doc
- Paul Muller as Dewey
- Uwe Reichmeister as Billy

== Bibliography ==
- Blake, Matt; Deal, David (2004). The Eurospy Guide. Baltimore: Luminary Press. ISBN 978-1-887664-52-3.
