= That Can't Shake Our Willi! =

1970 film

- Directed by: Rolf Olsen
- Written by: Rolf Olsen
- Produced by: Heinz Willeg
- Starring: Heinz Erhardt; Ruth Stephan; Günther Jerschke
- Cinematography: Franz Xaver Lederle
- Edited by: Renate Willeg
- Music by: Erwin Halletz
- Production companies: Allianz Filmproduktion; Terra Film
- Distributed by: Constantin Film
- Release date: 26 November 1970
- Running time: 85 minutes
- Country: West Germany
- Language: German

That Can't Shake Our Willi! (German: Das kann doch unsren Willi nicht erschüttern) is a 1970 German comedy film directed by Rolf Olsen and starring Heinz Erhardt, Ruth Stephan, and Günther Jerschke. It is a sequel to the film What Is the Matter with Willi?. It was followed in 1971 by a third film Our Willi Is the Best, made with Erhard returning as Willi. The final film Willi Manages The Whole Thing was released in 1972.

The film's sets were designed by the art director Ernst H. Albrecht.

== Synopsis ==
When Sieglinde Hirsekorn and her neighbour Mizzi Buntje meet while shopping, Mizzi brags about her planned holiday in Italy as she does not expect her neighbours to be able to afford travelling there. But, provoked by this, Sieglinde Hirsekorn claims that she and her family had decided to travel to Italy long before the neighbours did. Now she has to get her husband to agree on the holiday. Of course they travel to the same place as the neighbours do and the competitiveness of the families doesn't stop on vacation.

== Cast ==
- Heinz Erhardt as Willi Alfons Hirsekorn
- Ruth Stephan as Sieglinde Hirsekorn
- Günther Jerschke as Heimo Buntje
- Käte Jaenicke as 'Mizzi' Buntje
- Hans Terofal as Luitbert
- Irina von Bentheim as 'Lotti' Hirsekorn
- Nicolai von Bentheim as 'Kuno' Hirsekorn
- Angelika Baumgart as Petra Buntje
- Klaus-Hagen Latwesen as Herbert
- Almut Berg as Clementine
