= Walter Buschhoff =

German actor (1923–2010)

- Born: 8 July 1923; Worms, Rhineland, Germany
- Died: 7 December 2010 (aged 87); Munich, Bavaria, Germany
- Occupation: Actor
- Years active: 1956-2006 (film & TV)

Walter Buschhoff (1923–2010) was a German stage, film and television actor. He was married to the actress Maria Körber.

== Selected filmography ==
- IA in Oberbayern (1956) - Dr. Hans von Spörling
- Heiße Ernte (1956) - Oskar Blume
- Saison in Oberbayern (1956) - Paul
- Vater, unser bestes Stück (1957) - Ferruccio
- Two Bavarians in the Harem (1957) - Halim Pascha (uncredited)
- Der Schinderhannes (1958) - Iltis Jakob
- Two Times Adam, One Time Eve (1959) - Matti
- Kein Mann zum Heiraten (1959) - Sizilianer
- The Miracle of Father Malachia (1961) - Cop Pohl
- Life Begins at Eight (1962) - Willibald Barthels
- Dicke Luft (1962) - Prokurist
- The Endless Night (1963) - Ernst Kramer
- The House in Karp Lane (1965) - Krauthammer
- The Swedish Girl (1965) - Georg
- Who Wants to Sleep? (1965) - Doctor
- The Fountain of Love (1966) - Wirt, the Innkeeper
- Once a Greek (1966) - Dolder
- Scarabea: How Much Land Does a Man Need? (1969) - Herr bach
- The Brazen Women of Balzac (1969) - Phileas Leuwenstam
- Köpfchen in das Wasser, Schwänzchen in die Höh’ (1969)
- Help, I Love Twins (1969) - Busebius
- Ehepaar sucht gleichgesinntes (1969) - Staatsanwalt
- Hotel by the Hour (1970) - Lucas Freund
- Heintje - Mein bester Freund (1970) - Herr Hartmann
- The Priest of St. Pauli (1970) - Generaldirektor Carl Ostro
- Das haut den stärksten Zwilling um (1971) - Peter's Boss
- Wintermärchen (1971) - First Lieutenant
- The New Adventures of Vidocq (1971, TV series) - Le docteur
- Bloody Friday (1972) - Walter Lotzmann
- The Stuff That Dreams Are Made Of (1972) - Kuschke
- Around the World with Fanny Hill (1974) - William
- Die Angst ist ein zweiter Schatten (1975)
- Vortex (1976) - Le docteur Ruth
- L'éducation amoureuse de Valentin (1976) - Le directeur de l'hôtel
- Anita Drögemöller und die Ruhe an der Ruhr (1976) - Don Alfonso
- Silence in the Forest (1976) - Sensburg
- Didi Drives Me Crazy (1986) - German Minister
- Non-Stop Trouble with the Experts (1988) - Otto von Ludwig
- Plaza Real (1988) - Weisse
- Wer zweimal lügt (1993) - Franz Huebner
- Rudy, the Racing Pig (1995) - Professor Kurt

== Bibliography ==
- Goble, Alan. The Complete Index to Literary Sources in Film. Walter de Gruyter, 1999.
