= The Fountain of Love =

1966 film

- Directed by: Ernst Hofbauer
- Written by: Walter Schneider
- Produced by: Karl Spiehs
- Starring: Hans-Jürgen Bäumler; Sieghardt Rupp; Eddi Arent; Ann Smyrner
- Cinematography: Franz Xaver Lederle
- Edited by: Gretl Girinec
- Music by: Claudius Alzner
- Production company: Intercontinental Produktion
- Distributed by: Constantin Film
- Release date: 21 January 1966
- Running time: 83 minutes
- Country: Austria
- Language: German

The Fountain of Love (German: Die Liebesquelle) is a 1966 Austrian comedy film directed by Ernst Hofbauer and starring Hans-Jürgen Bäumler, Sieghardt Rupp, Eddi Arent and Ann Smyrner. Much of the film was shot on location in Bulgaria. The film's sets were designed by the art director Wolf Witzemann.

== Synopsis ==
In an effort to boost tourism, the leaders Swedish mountain village invent a legend claiming that bathing in their local spring grants men exceptional virility and women irresistible beauty. The scheme backfires when a visiting journalist's report brings swarms of tourists to the town, just as the mayor has temporarily blocked the fountain to hide the deception from a government inspection. In a final twist the spring is discovered to be a genuine aphrodisiac, leading the Minister of Tourism to nationalise the lucrative site for the state.

== Cast ==
- Hans-Jürgen Bäumler as Leif
- Sieghardt Rupp as Nils Hansen
- Eddi Arent as Alwin Knobbe
- Ann Smyrner as Stina
- Hartmut Hinrichs as Carl
- Christa Linder as Britta
- Christiane Rücker as Grit
- Marianne Schönauer as Frau von Weyden
- Balduin Baas as Druggist
- Helga Marlo as Caroline
- Walter Buschhoff as Wirt, the Innkeeper
- Ellen Umlauf as Teacher
- Werner Abrolat as John
- Emily Reuer as Frieda
- Herbert Tiede as Pastor
- Karin Field as Victoria
- Dimitar Panov as Lars Pogge

== Bibliography ==
- Von Dassanowsky, Robert. Austrian Cinema: A History. McFarland, 2005.
