= When Night Falls on the Reeperbahn =

- German film poster
- German: Wenn es Nacht wird auf der Reeperbah
- Directed by: Rolf Olsen
- Written by: Rolf Olsen
- Produced by: Heinz Willeg
- Starring: Erik Schumann; Fritz Wepper; Konrad Georg
- Cinematography: Franz Xaver Lederle
- Edited by: Renate Willeg
- Music by: Erwin Halletz
- Production company: Allianz Filmproduktion
- Distributed by: Constantin Film
- Release date: 12 October 1967
- Running time: 98 minutes
- Country: West Germany
- Language: German

When Night Falls on the Reeperbahn (German: Wenn es Nacht wird auf der Reeperbahn) is a 1967 West German crime film directed by Rolf Olsen and starring Erik Schumann, Fritz Wepper and Konrad Georg. It was shot at the Tempelhof Studios in Berlin and on location around Hamburg. The role played by Konrad Georg was modelled on a similar one he played in the television series Kommissar Freytag.

The film was a commercial success and over the next few years Olsen directed several further Hamburg-set crime films, many of them starring Curd Jürgens.

== Cast ==
- Erik Schumann as Danny Sonntag
- Fritz Wepper as Till Voss
- Marianne Hoffmann as Lotti Norkus
- Jürgen Draeger as Feuer-Hotte
- Konrad Georg as Hauptkommissar Zinner
- Marlies Dräger as Karin
- Heinz Reincke as Uwe Wagenknecht
- Herbert Tiede as Wilhelm Voss, general manager
- Karl Lieffen as Karlchen Dincke
- Tanja Gruber as Pinky Schön
- Willi Rose as Mumps
- Gabriele Scharon as Margot
- Friedrich Schütter as Dr. Buding
- Rudolf Schündler as Hanns Henningsen, manager
- Brigitte Schacht as Brigitte Trautmann
- Frank Nossack as Volker
- Joachim Richert as Frank
- Günter Lüdke as Jens Paulsen, commissioner
- Dieter Wagner as Manfred Nagel, director
- Erni Mangold as Wanda
- Günter Glaser as Papadopoulos
- Horst Hesslein as Bouncer at Puff
- Rolf Olsen as Arzt
- Alexander Paris as Jürgen
- Marina Ried as Marthe Henningsen
- Hans Waldherr as Raufbold in Nachtclub
- Verena Wiet as Sybille Voss
