= Tread Softly (1965 film) =

1965 film

Tready Softly
- Directed by: Harald Philipp
- Written by: George Hurdalek
- Produced by: Heinz Willeg
- Starring: George Nader; Horst Frank; Sylvia Pascal
- Cinematography: Albert Benitz
- Edited by: Klaus Dudenhöfer
- Music by: Peter Thomas
- Production companies: Allianz Filmproduktion; Constantin Film
- Distributed by: Constantin Film
- Release date: 6 May 1965
- Running time: 89 minutes
- Country: West Germany
- Language: German

Tready Softly/The Violin Case Murders (German title:Schüsse aus dem Geigenkasten) is a 1965 German thriller film directed by Fritz Umgelter and starring George Nader, Heinz Weiss and Sylvia Pascal. It is the first in the Jerry Cotton series of films.

== Plot ==
A group of men murder two people in Pasadena, then rob a safe of a large amount of cash. Later the same men arrive at an isolated farm house near Chicago, kill the occupants, and retrieve a stash of (very light) gold bars.

As the same gun was used in both cases, FBI director John High takes over the investigation, and assigns it to agents Jerry Cotton and his sidekick Phil Decker. High reveals that he had received phone calls from a woman calling herself Mary Springfield, who was concerned that her sister was involved with a gangster. The movements of the sister match well with the two crimes and High believes there is a connection.

Cotton locates Mary Springfield and follows her. Unfortunately the villains run her over in their car, and Cotton is unable to prevent her death. She is, however, able to reveal that the gang in planning a final heist, and to direct him to a bowling alley near Grand Central Station. Realising that time is short, Cotton persuades High that they must act immediately.

That same evening, Cotton, posing as an alcoholic ex-servicemen named Jimmy Logan, visits the bowling alley and soon confirms that the gang (Latschek, Percy, Sniff and Babe) are all employees there. He instigates a fight with the gang members and beats them up, impressing their boss Christallo. Despite the fact that it is the evening before their last job, Christallo lets Logan (Cotton) join the gang. Meanwhile the brains of the operation, Kilborne, is making last minute preparations for the final robbery.

The gang members don't trust Cotton, but he manages to get a coded message to Decker, who then arranges a fake news alert stating that Logan (alias Cotton) is wanted for the crimes committed by the gang. This reassures Christallo, who orders Cotton to drive Kitty, Mary's sister, to the airport. On the way, he tells her that Mary has been killed by Christallo's men and she reveals where the gang plans to strike next.

The villains prepare an explosion in a school to distract from the robbery. Cotton and Kitty arrive at the school and, while Kitty helps to evacuate the children, Cotton moves the bomb - although he cannot prevent a controlled explosion. The gang break into an adjacent flat, murder the occupants, and remove the valuables they find there.

As the criminals escape across the rooftops, Cotton sets out in pursuit. It is unclear at this stage whether the gang members trust Cotton or not, but Percy brings him to the gang's hideout in Brooklyn. Cotton then reveals his true identity and tries to arrest Percy, but the other gang members overpower and capture him.

Kilborne tells Cotton to phone High and pass on false information about the gang's planned escape, but instead he quickly gives the address of the Brooklyn hideout, before beating up the whole gang and escaping. Fed up with Christallo's incompetence, Kilborne shoots him dead, and the rest of the gang members leave the hideout and go into hiding.

High realises that all three crimes have one thing in common, a connection to his old friend Edward Hamilton. High confronts Hamilton, who agrees that a lot of relevant information is in his possession, but denies any involvement in the crimes. As Cotton and Decker arrive to arrest Hamilton, Kilborne turns up at the house and kidnaps him. Cotton realises that Kilborne is Hamilton's son-in-law, and now plans to escape from New York using Hamilton's boat.

As Kilborne goes to pick up his confederates, Cotton and Decker pursue him in a speedboat. Cotton gets aboard Hamilton's boat and overpowers Kilborne, while Decker goes after the rest of the gang, who are waiting onshore. As the villains force Decker back into the sea, Cotton calls in reinforcements and is transported to the scene by helicopter. The remaining gang members are captured (or killed), and Cotton calls High to confirm Hamilton's innocence.

== Cast ==
- George Nader ... Jerry Cotton
- Heinz Weiss ... Phil Decker
- Richard Münch ... Mr. High
- Sylvia Pascal ... Kitty Springfield
- Helga Schlack ... Helen
- Helmut Förnbacher ... Percy
- Philippe Guégan ... Sniff
- Hans E. Schons ... Christallo
- Hans Waldherr ... Babe
- Heidi Leupolt ... Mary Springfield
- Franz Rudnick ... Dr. Jim Kilborne
- Robert Rathke ... Latschek

== Bibliography ==
- Blake, Matt; Deal, David (2004). The Eurospy Guide. Baltimore: Luminary Press. ISBN 978-1-887664-52-3.
