= Murderers Club of Brooklyn =

1967 film

- Scene from a film
- German: Der Mörderclub von Brooklyn
- Directed by: Werner Jacobs
- Written by: Manfred R. Köhler; Herbert Reinecker
- Produced by: Heinz Willeg
- Starring: George Nader; Heinz Weiss; Karel Stepanek
- Cinematography: Franz Xaver Lederle
- Edited by: Alfred Srp
- Music by: Peter Thomas
- Production company: Allianz Filmproduktion
- Distributed by: Constantin Film
- Release date: 17 March 1967
- Running time: 96 minutes
- Country: West Germany
- Language: German

Murderers Club of Brooklyn (German: Der Mörderclub von Brooklyn) is a 1967 German thriller film directed by Werner Jacobs and starring George Nader, Heinz Weiss, and Karel Stepanek. It is the fifth in the Jerry Cotton series of films. The film was shot at the Wandsbek Studios. Location shooting took place in Hamburg and New York City.

== Plot ==
A gang of kidnappers is specialized in abducting children of top managers. Jerry Cotton's mission is to save the children and to arrest the gangsters. His first attempts backfire. One of the abducted kids gets killed and then Jerry's colleague Phil is taken hostage. Before he succeeds, Jerry has to discover the criminals have a secret partner on the inside.

== Cast ==
- George Nader as Jerry Cotton
- Heinz Weiss as Phil Decker
- Helmut Förnbacher as Bryan Dyers
- Karel Štěpánek as Dyers
- Helga Anders as Edna Cormick
- Helmut Kircher as Burnie Johnson
- Heinz Reincke as Sam
- Helmuth Rudolph as Mr. Johnson
- Dagmar Lassander as Jean Dyers
- Wolfgang Weiser as Harry Long
