= Herbert Tiede =

- Born: 3 March 1915; Osnabrück, Kingdom of Prussia, German Empire
- Died: 12 January 1987 (aged 71); Munich, Bavaria, West Germany
- Occupation: Actor
- Years active: 1943–1975

Herbert Tiede (3 March 1915 – 12 January 1987) was a German actor. He appeared in more than one hundred films from 1943 to 1975.

== Filmography ==
Year	Title	Role	Notes
1943	Titanic	2nd Officer Lightoller	Uncredited
1947	Jan und die Schwindlerin	Peter Remmers	
1949	Love '47	Schwiegersohn des Obersts	
1958	… und nichts als die Wahrheit	Dr. Peter Bernburger	
1959	The Shepherd from Trutzberg	Korbin von Puechstein	
1959	Rommel Calls Cairo	Col. Robertson	
1959	Court Martial	Capt. Paulsen	
1959	Morgen wirst du um mich weinen	Dr. Korss	
1959	Ein Tag, der nie zu Ende geht	Inspektor O'Brien	
1960	Carnival Confession	Merzbecher	
1960	Until Money Departs You	Fritz Hassen	
1960	Das schwarze Schaf	Police Inspector Graven	
1960	The Last Witness	Dr. Heinz Stephans Anwalt	
1962	The Parallel Street	Gremiumsmitglied Nr. 5	
1964	Destination Death	Inspektor Ernst Sobotka	
1966	The Fountain of Love	Pastor	
1967	When Night Falls on the Reeperbahn	Generaldirektor Wilhelm Voss	
1970	Wie ein Blitz	Lawyer John Mills	2 episodes
1972	Lo chiameremo Andrea		
1973	Old Barge, Young Love	Generaldirektor Bockmann	
1976	Anita Drögemöller und die Ruhe an der Ruhr		
1976	Shir Khofteh		
1977	The Expulsion from Paradise	Minor Role	
1979	Zwei tolle Käfer räumen auf		
