= The Last Witness (1960 film) =

1960 film directed by Wolfgang Staudte

- Film poster
- Directed by: Wolfgang Staudte
- Written by: Thomas Keck; Robert A. Stemmle; Maximilian Vernberg
- Produced by: Kurt Ulrich; Heinz Willeg
- Starring: Martin Held; Hanns Lothar; Ellen Schwiers
- Cinematography: Ekkehard Kyrath
- Edited by: Wolfgang Wehrum
- Music by: Werner Eisbrenner
- Production company: Kurt Ulrich Filmproduktion
- Distributed by: Europa-Filmverleih
- Release date: 30 December 1960
- Running time: 102 minutes
- Country: West Germany
- Language: German

The Last Witness (German: Der Letzte Zeuge) is a 1960 West German crime film directed by Wolfgang Staudte and starring Martin Held, Hanns Lothar and Ellen Schwiers. It was entered into the 1961 Cannes Film Festival. It was shot at the Spandau Studios in Berlin. The film's sets were designed by the art director Hans Kuhnert.

== Cast ==
- Martin Held as Direktor Werner Rameil
- Hanns Lothar as Lawyer Dr. Fox
- Ellen Schwiers as Ingrid Bernhardy
- Jürgen Goslar as Dr. Heinz Stephan
- Adelheid Seeck as Gerda Rameil
- Werner Hinz as Landgerichtsrat Ricker
- Lore Hartling as Assessorin Ebeling
- Siegfried Wischnewski as Kriminalinspektor Gerhuf
- Harald Juhnke as Kriminalsekretär Wenzel
- Otto Graf as Anwalt Dr. Beyer
- Albert Bessler as Dr. Hollberg
- Lucie Mannheim as Frau Bernhardy
- Hans Hessling as Vorsitzender des Schwurgerichts
- Hellmut Grube as Prosecutor Thalmann
- Rudi Schmitt as Amtsgerichtsrat Glänzer
- Herbert Tiede as Dr. Heinz Stephan's Lawyer
- Blandine Ebinger as Gymnastiklehrerin

== Bibliography ==
- Goble, Alan. The Complete Index to Literary Sources in Film. Walter de Gruyter, 1999.
