= Death and Diamonds (film) =

1968 film

- Directed by: Harald Reinl
- Written by: Gustav H. Lübbe (novel); Rolf Schulz; Christa Stern
- Produced by: Heinz Willeg
- Starring: George Nader; Carl Möhner; Heinz Weiss
- Cinematography: Franz Xaver Lederle
- Edited by: Hermann Haller
- Music by: Peter Thomas
- Production company: Allianz Filmproduktion
- Distributed by: Constantin Film
- Release date: 23 February 1968
- Running time: 91 minutes
- Country: West Germany
- Language: German

Death and Diamonds (German: Dynamit in grüner Seide) is a 1968 German thriller film directed by Harald Reinl and starring George Nader, Carl Möhner, and Heinz Weiss. It is the seventh in the Jerry Cotton series of films about an FBI agent.

It was shot at the Tempelhof Studios in Berlin. The film's sets were designed by the art director Ernst H. Albrecht. Location shooting took place in Los Angeles, Berlin and the Dalmatian coast.

== Plot ==
Jerry Cotton goes undercover to take out a criminal organisation including its bosses. Disguised as a British specialist for alarm systems he joins the gang which has a preference for diamonds. Taking part in their current activities he tries to get to their leaders. Although he works as prudently as he can he arouses suspicion and becomes a target himself.

== Cast ==
- George Nader as Jerry Cotton
- Carl Möhner as Bloom
- Silvia Solar as Lana
- Heinz Weiss as Phil Decker
- Claus Holm as Butt Lancaster
- Günther Schramm as Tackley
- Marlies Draeger as Mabel
- Karl-Heinz Fiege as Santon
- Dieter Eppler as Tomasio
- Käthe Haack as Mrs. Cotton
- Horst Niendorf as FBI director
- Rainer Basedow as Fat
- Claus Tinney as Rick Trevor
- Hansi Waldherr as Tommie

== Bibliography ==
- Blake, Matt; Deal, David (2004). The Eurospy Guide. Baltimore: Luminary Press. ISBN 978-1-887664-52-3.
