= Günther Jerschke =

German actor (1921–1997)

- Born: 8 October 1921; Breslau, Silesia, Germany
- Died: 6 May 1997 (aged 75); Hamburg, Germany
- Occupation: Actor
- Years active: 1938-1996

Günther Jerschke (1921–1997) was a German actor.

== Selected filmography ==
- Pour le Mérite (1938) - Adjutant des Kommandeurs der Flieger
- Maya of the Seven Veils (1951)
- Kommen Sie am Ersten (1951) - Inspizient
- Under the Thousand Lanterns (1952) - Metzler
- Toxi (1952)
- Der Weg zu Dir (1952)
- Fight of the Tertia (1952) - Dr. Grau
- Dreaming Lips (1953) - Sekretär
- The Singing Hotel (1953)
- The Private Secretary (1953)
- Wedding in Transit (1953) - Reiseteilnehmer
- Men at a Dangerous Age (1954) - Butz (Butzinzky, Sekretär)
- The Man of My Life (1954)
- Three from Variety (1954)
- Three Days Confined to Barracks (1955) - Musketier Sanftmut
- Zu Befehl, Frau Feldwebel (1956) - Krischke
- Nina (1956) - Leutnant Sergejeff
- Confessions of Felix Krull (1957) - 2. Polizeibeamter
- Doctor Crippen Lives (1958) - Gendarm
- The Daughter of Hamburg (1958)
- Bühne frei für Marika (1958)
- Der Schinderhannes (1958) - Welscher Jockel
- The Man Who Sold Himself (1959) - Dr. Zerbst
- Crime After School (1959) - Verteidiger Dr. Baumriss
- Of Course, the Motorists (1959) - 1. LKW-Fahrer (uncredited)
- Der Frosch mit der Maske (1959) - Newsreader on Radio (voice, uncredited)
- The Buddenbrooks (1959, part 1, 2) - Kandidat Modersohn
- Salem Aleikum (1959) - Ali Ben Ali
- Triplets on Board (1959) - Reinwald - Fernsehreporter
- Until Hell Is Frozen (1961) - Gellert
- The Dead Eyes of London (1961) - Polizeiarzt (German version) / Coroner (English version) (uncredited)
- The Forger of London (1961) - Rechtsanwalt Radlow / Radio-Kommentator (voice, uncredited)
- Our House in Cameroon (1961) - Herr Biermann (uncredited)
- The Liar (1961) - Inspektor
- The Puzzle of the Red Orchid (1962) - Mr. Shelby
- Encounter in Salzburg (1964) - Direktor Wechsel
- Polizeirevier Davidswache (1964) - Nörgler (uncredited)
- Diamonds Are Brittle (1965)
- Die Rechnung – eiskalt serviert (1966) - Chuck (voice, uncredited)
- Love Thy Neighbour (1967)
- The Heathens of Kummerow (1967) - Niemeier
- Angels of the Street (1969) - Rechtsanwalt Quassel (voice, uncredited)
- That Can't Shake Our Willi! (1970) - Heimo Buntje
- St. Pauli Report (1971) - Oskar
- The Eddie Chapman Story (1971, TV film) - Mr. J.
- Die Stadt im Tal (1975, TV film) - Praetorius
