= Only the Wind =

1961 film

- Directed by: Fritz Umgelter
- Screenplay by: Fritz Umgelter
- Produced by: Rob McCarthy
- Starring: Freddy Quinn; Gustav Knuth; Cordula Trantow; Heinz Weiss; Maureen Toal
- Cinematography: Kurt Grigoleit
- Edited by: Heinz Haber
- Music by: Lotar Olias
- Production company: Melodie Film
- Distributed by: Casino Film Exchange; UFA Film Hansa; Film Jewels
- Release date: September 29, 1961 (West Germany)
- Running time: 87 minutes
- Country: West Germany
- Language: English

Only the Wind is a 1961 West German crime film directed and written by Fritz Umgelter and starring Freddy Quinn, Gustav Knuth and Heinz Weiss. The film is a crime drama film set off the western Irish coast.

== Cast ==
- Freddy Quinn as Mike
- Gustav Knuth as Sean O'Connor
- Cordula Trantow as Eileen O'Connor
- Heinz Weiss as Jack Johnston
- Maureen Toal as Mrs. Collins
- Georg Lehn as Nicholas
- Gudrun Schmidt as Dinah
- Helmut Oeser as Roger
- Gottfried Herbe as Tim O'Connor
- Dorit Amann as Celia
- Georg Hartmann as Finn
- Hans E. Schons as Paddy MacPhail
- Walter Wilz as Angus
