= Richard Münch (actor) =

German actor (1916–1987)

- Born: Richard Heinrich Ludwig Münch; 10 January 1916; Giessen, Hesse, Germany
- Died: 6 June 1987 (aged 71); Málaga, Andalusia, Spain
- Other names: Richard Muench; Richard Munch
- Occupation: Actor
- Years active: 1951–1987
- Spouse: Ella Büchi

Richard Heinrich Ludwig Münch (10 January 1916 – 6 June 1987) was a German actor, best known for portraying Alfred Jodl in Patton (1970). He also portrayed General Erich Marcks in The Longest Day (1962).

== Selected filmography ==
- Der Verlorene (1951) – Criminal Inspector No. 1 (uncredited)
- Zwei blaue Augen (1955) – Schneider, Ingenieur
- Doctor Crippen Lives (1958) – Reverend Bennet
- Nasser Asphalt (1958) – Dr. Wolf
- Restless Night (1958) – Kriegsgerichtsrat
- Frau im besten Mannesalter (1959) – Herr Wegner, Director of the "Imperial"
- Stalingrad: Dogs, Do You Want to Live Forever? (1959) – Oberstleutnant Kesselbach
- Crime After School (1959) – Oberst Dr. König
- Heaven, Love and Twine (1960) – Major Knorr
- Pichler's Books Are Not in Order (1961)
- The Miracle of Father Malachia (1961) – Dr. Erwin Glass
- Redhead (1962) – Joachim
- The Longest Day (1962) – Gen. Erich Marcks
- The Inn on the River (1962) – Dr. Collins
- Mark of the Tortoise (1964) – Mario Orlandi di Alsconi
- The Visit (1964) – Teacher
- The Train (1964) – Gen. Von Lubitz
- Jerry Cotton 1: Manhattan Night of Murder (1965) – Mr. High
- Who Wants to Sleep? (1965) – Walter Morten
- Jerry Cotton 2: Tread Softly (1965) – Mr. High
- Hocuspocus (1966) – Gerichtspräsident
- Jerry Cotton 3: Die Rechnung – eiskalt serviert (1966) – Mr. High
- Killer's Carnival (1966) – Professor Alden (Frame story)
- Call Girls of Frankfurt (1966) – Dr. Freytag
- Jerry Cotton 4: The Trap Snaps Shut at Midnight (1966) – Mr. High
- The Pipes (1966) – Lord Edward
- Jerry Cotton 5: Murderers Club of Brooklyn (1967) – Mr. High
- Hot Pavements of Cologne (1967) – Public Prosecutor Dr. Rolf Stauffer
- The Bridge at Remagen (1969) – Feldmarschall Von Sturmer
- Sir Basil Zaharoff – Makler des Todes (1969, TV film) – Basil Zaharoff
- Patton (1970) – Colonel General Alfred Jodl
- Der Kommissar: Dr. Meinhardts trauriges Ende (1970, TV series episode) – Dr. Bibeina
- Maximilian von Mexiko (1970, TV film) – Kardinal
- Perahim – die zweite Chance (1974, TV film) – Bogini
- Lobster: Stirb! (1976, TV series episode) – Ernst Brühl
- Derrick: Kalkutta (1976, TV series episode) – Konsistorialrat
- Group Portrait with a Lady (1977) – Hubert Gruyten
- The Old Fox: Bumerang (1978, TV series episode) – Dr. Kargus
- Die seltsamen Begegnungen des Prof. Taratonga (1978, TV film) – Prof. Tarantoga
- Der ganz normale Wahnsinn (1979, TV series) – Jungblut, Verleger
- The Old Fox: Der Tote im Wagen (1983, TV series episode) – Dr. Dannhaus
- The Holcroft Covenant (1985) – Oberst
- Target (1985) – Colonel
- Das Totenreich (1986, TV film) – Tyge Enslev
- Derrick: Der Charme der Bahamas (1986, TV series episode) – Richard Haber
- Of Pure Blood (1986, TV film) – Dr. Bamberg
- Sommer in Lesmona (1987, TV miniseries) – Consul Lürmann
- Le grand secret (1989, TV miniseries) – Prof. Bahanba
