= Heinz Weiss =

German actor

- Born: 12 June 1921; Stuttgart, Germany
- Died: 20 November 2010 (aged 89); Grünwald, Germany
- Occupation: Actor
- Years active: 1958–1999

Heinz Weiss (12 June 1921 – 20 November 2010) was a German film actor.

Weiss is best known for playing the role of Phil Decker in the Jerry Cotton series of films and the role of Captain Heinz Hansen in Das Traumschiff. He also played the character "Kramer" in the iconic World War II film The Great Escape (1963). He himself had served in German military, the Wehrmacht, during World War II.

He died on 20 November 2010 in Grünwald near Munich.

== Filmography ==
=== Film ===
Year	Title	Role	Notes
1958	Wenn die Conny mit dem Peter	Schmidt - gymnastics teacher	
1960	Strafbataillon 999	Lieutenant Obermeier	
1960	Brandenburg Division	Dörner	
1960	Big Request Concert	Stefan	
1961	The Green Archer	John Bellamy / John Wood / The Green Bowman	
1961	Only the Wind	Jack Johnston	
1961	Blind Justice	prosecutor	
1961	Auf Wiedersehen	Steve O'Hara	
1963	The Great Escape	Kramer	
1965	Tread Softly	Phil Decker	
1965	Mordnacht in Manhattan	Phil Decker	
1966	The Trap Snaps Shut at Midnight	Phil Decker	
1966	Die Rechnung – eiskalt serviert	Phil Decker	
1967	Murderers Club of Brooklyn	Phil Decker	
1968	Death and Diamonds	Phil Decker	
1968	Death in the Red Jaguar	Phil Decker	
1969	Dead Body on Broadway	Phil Decker	
1970	Immer bei Vollmond	Commissar Mallet	
1975	Die Brücke von Zupanja	Surgeon Major	
1981	Confused Feelings	M. Keller	
1982	The Roaring Forties	Joss	
1982	Doctor Faustus	Jonathan Leverkühn	
1984	The Little Drummer Girl	Red Cross	
1985	Le transfuge		

=== Television ===
Year	Title	Role	Notes
1959	As Far as My Feet Will Carry Me	Clemens Forell	TV miniseries
1964	Flug in Gefahr	Pilot	
1968	Sir Roger Casement	Roger Casement	
1971–1973	Graf Luckner	Capitain Luckner	39 episodes
1978	Wallenstein	Zierotin	TV miniseries
1981	Berlin Tunnel 21	Heppner	
1983–1999	Das Traumschiff	Captain Heinz Hansen	25 episodes (final appearance)
