= Beyond Control (film) =

1968 film

- Directed by: Helmut Förnbacher
- Written by: Helmut Förnbacher; Pietro Liberatori; Charly Niessen; Martin Roda-Becher
- Produced by: Martin Hellstern; Peter Hellstern; Ernst Steinlechner
- Starring: William Berger; Helga Anders; Giorgia Moll
- Cinematography: Igor Luther
- Edited by: Clara Fabry
- Music by: Charly Niessen
- Production company: Rinco Film
- Distributed by: Alpha-Filmverleih
- Release date: 9 October 1968
- Running time: 90 minutes
- Countries: Italy; West Germany
- Language: German

Beyond Control (German: Sommersprossen) is a 1968 Italian-West-German crime film directed by Helmut Förnbacher and starring William Berger, Förnbacher, Helga Anders and Giorgia Moll. It also featured the Nazi era film star Willy Birgel in one of two films he appeared in tied to the New German Cinema. Location shooting took place around Basel and Muttenz. The film's sets were designed by the art director Guy Sheppard.

== Synopsis ==
In 1934 a pair of German bank robbers escape over the border into Switzerland where they go on commit a series of Bonnie and Clyde style raids and meet up with a couple of local woman who admire their glamorous lifestyle.

== Cast ==
- William Berger as Velte
- Helmut Förnbacher as Sandweg
- Helga Anders as Monika
- Giorgia Moll as Brigitte
- Willy Birgel as Public Prosecutor
- Benno Hoffmann as Rich man
- Grit Boettcher as Christine
- Harald Dietl as Supervisor

== Bibliography ==
- Eppenberger, Beni & Stapfer, Daniel. Mädchen, Machos und Moneten: die unglaubliche Geschichte des Schweizer Kinounternehmers Erwin C. Dietrich. Verlag Scharfe Stiefel, 2006.
- Reimer, Robert C. & Reimer, Carol J. The A to Z of German Cinema. Scarecrow Press, 2010.
