= Carl Lange (actor) =

German actor (1909–1999)

- Born: 30 October 1909; Flensburg, Germany
- Died: 23 June 1999 (aged 89); Ostfildern, Germany
- Occupation: Actor
- Years active: 1954–1985

Carl (or Karl) Lange (30 October 1909 – 23 June 1999) was a German film actor. He appeared in more than 70 films between 1954 and 1985. He was born in Flensburg, Germany and died in Ostfildern, Germany.

== Partial filmography ==
- Ernst Thälmann (1954) - Zweiter Arbeiter
- Der Stern von Afrika (1957) - Hauptmann Krusenberg
- The Devil Strikes at Night (1957) - Major Thomas Wollenberg
- Doctor Crippen Lives (1958) - Aristide Coq
- Grabenplatz 17 (1958) - Harald Flint
- Der Schinderhannes (1958) - Priester
- Christine (1958) - (uncredited)
- Stalingrad: Dogs, Do You Want to Live Forever? (1959) - General von Seydlitz
- Der Frosch mit der Maske (1959) - John Bennet
- The Forests Sing Forever (1959) - Mr. von Gall
- Darkness Fell on Gotenhafen (1960) - Kapitän Zahn
- Mistress of the World (1960) - Berakov
- Headquarters State Secret (1960) - Hauptmann Reßler, Abwehr-Offizier
- The Inheritance of Bjorndal (1960) - Mr. von Gall
- Die Brücke des Schicksals (1960) - Chefredakteur
- Officer Factory (1960) - Generalmajor Modersohn
- Bankraub in der Rue Latour (1961) - Regisseur Bergström
- Girl from Hong Kong (1961) - Knut Ohlsen
- Barbara (1961) - Amtmann Heyde
- The Carpet of Horror (1962) - Colonel Gregory
- In the Matter of J. Robert Oppenheimer (1964, TV Movie) - Gordon Gray
- Der Prozeß Carl von O. (1964, TV Movie) - Heinz Jäger
- Mark of the Tortoise (1964) - Crantor
- Der Hexer (1964) - Reverend Hopkins
- The Last Tomahawk (1965) - Colonel Munroe
- Code Name: Jaguar (1965) - Vassili Golochenko
- Duel at Sundown (1965) - Pastor
- The Desperado Trail (1965) - Gouverneur
- Creature with the Blue Hand (1967) - Dr. Albert Mangrove
- The Blood Demon (1967) - Anatol
- Midsummer Night (1967) - Arne
- Death in the Red Jaguar (1968) - Dr. Saunders
- Perrak (1970) - Police President
- The Priest of St. Pauli (1970) - Monsignore
- Holidays in Tyrol (1971) - Konsul Kersten
- The Captain (1971) - Victor Anderson
- Cry of the Black Wolves (1972) - Nicholas Morse
- Hubertus Castle (1973) - Graf Egge
- Der Stechlin (1975, TV Mini-Series) - Graf Barby
- Derrick (1977, Season 4, Episode 3: "Eine Nacht im Oktober") - Prosecutor Dr. Meyers
- Die Buddenbrooks (1979, TV Mini-Series) - Leberecht Kröger
- Derrick (1984, Season 11, Episode 3: "Manuels Pfleger") - Herr Färber
