= Sir Roger Casement (miniseries) =

1968 West German miniseries

- Genre: Historical drama
- Written by: Helmut Andics; Werner Murawski
- Directed by: Hermann Kugelstadt
- Starring: Heinz Weiss; Kurt Hübner; Fritz Haneke
- No. of episodes: 2 episodes

Production
- Running time: 180 minutes
- Production company: Aurora Television Produktion

Original release
- Network: ZDF
- Release: 26 September – 27 September 1968

The Tragedy of Sir Roger Casement is a 1968 West German television miniseries starring Heinz Weiss. The series depicts the efforts of the historical figure Sir Roger Casement to seek German aid for Irish independence during the First World War and his attempts to form an Irish Brigade of prisoners of war. The series is three hours long and shot in black and white.

== Cast ==
- Heinz Weiss ... Sir Roger Casement
- Kurt Hübner ... Devoy
- Hans W. Hamacher ... Redmond
- Fritz Haneke ... MacNeill
- Hans Schellbach ... Connolly
- Hans Timmermann ... McGarrity
- Almuth Ullerich ... Mary
- Hans Putz ... Doyle
- Thomas Braut ... Christensen
- Hans Paetsch ... Grey
- Richard Lauffen ... Findley
- Friedrich Schütter ... Thomson
- Dieter Groest ... Papen
- Viktor Warsitz ... Graf Oberndorff
- Otto Preuss ... Isendahl
