= Birke Bruck =

German actress

Birke Bruck is a German film and television actress.

== Selected filmography ==
- William Tell (1960)
- Die Rechnung – eiskalt serviert (1966)
- With Oak Leaves and Fig Leaf (1968)
- On the Reeperbahn at Half Past Midnight (1969)
- A.S. (1995–1998, TV series)
- The Hardship Test (1998)
