= Heinz Werner Höber =

German writer (1931–1996)

Heinz Werner Höber (1931 in Bärenstein – 15 May 1996) was a prolific pulp fiction author who produced novels about the fictitious FBI-agent Jerry Cotton and eventually sued his publisher because he felt he had been entitled to receive royalties.

== Early life ==
Like Karl May, Heinz Werner Höber was born in Saxony. He also had in common with Karl May that he had been born into a rather poor family. His father introduced him to the works of Karl May in order to give him an incentive to improve his reading skills. Consequently, the young Heinz Werner Höber started writing early his own Wild West stories, dreaming about having a career like Karl May, who had finally escaped poverty for good once he had published his famous tales about the fictional Wild West pioneer Old Shatterhand and the Native American Winnetou. After the war, Heinz Werner Höber befriended a Russian officer and on his way to West Germany he had the opportunity to visit the Karl May museum in Radebeul. According to "Der Mann, der Jerry Cotton war" ("The man who had been Jerry Cotton") the museum had been closed down for an unknown period of time, but the administrator gave him a sightseeing tour anyway after his Russian friend had emphasised that he carried a gun. But before Höber became a published writer he accomplished his school education.

== Career ==
After some futile attempts to thrive as an actor, a comedian or a playwright he started writing pulp fiction. That was when many Germans read pulp fiction on a regular basis because there was only one TV programme.

Höber gained the attention of Gustav Lübbe (of Bastei Lübbe publishing) when he was looking for somebody who could deliver new adventures of Jerry Cotton. The first author of Jerry Cotton had grown tired of his creation and of writing pulp fiction in general. Höber became his successor and led Jerry Cotton to new heights.

He worked diligently on the new stories and, driven by his ambitions to walk in the footsteps of Karl May, he performed a lot of research on the FBI and on New York. He also invented an American Indian sidekick called Zeerokah for Jerry Cotton. But as opposite to Karl May he didn't reach any fame because allegedly the G-man Jerry Cotton wrote all his tales himself.

Höber received only an all-inclusive fee for each novel, not considering the amplitude of the publisher's profit. So Heinz Werner Höber followed his cherished idol Karl May another time by meeting his own publisher in court. He demanded recognition as the main author of Jerry Cotton and a significant part of the profit.

He was neither the actual creator of Jerry Cotton nor at any time the only author of the series. Although he was considered to probably be most productive and certainly most committed of the about 100 writers. He had also never been promised to be named or to receive royalties. Therefore, the trial did not make him rich but ruined him.

Still, he eventually reached a high profile, published books under his real name and won the highly accredited Glauser Award.
