= Horst Niendorf =

German actor (1926–1999)

- Born: Horst Hermann Heinrich Niendorf; 28 June 1926; Piesteritz, Germany
- Died: 17 June 1999 (aged 72); Xàbia, Spain
- Occupation: Actor
- Years active: 1951–1996

Horst Hermann Heinrich Niendorf (28 June 1926 – 17 June 1999) was a German actor. He appeared in more than ninety films from 1951 to 1996.

== Selected filmography ==
Year	Title	Role	Notes
1952	Turtledove General Delivery		
1965	Die letzten Drei der Albatros		
1968	Death and Diamonds		
1977	Grete Minde		
