= Helmut Förnbacher =

Swiss actor, director, and screenwriter

- Born: 26 January 1936 (age 90); Basel, Switzerland
- Occupations: Actor, film director, screenwriter
- Years active: 1959–present

Helmut Förnbacher (born 26 January 1936) is a Swiss actor, film director and screenwriter. He has appeared in more than 70 films and television shows since 1959. He starred in the 1976 film The Sudden Loneliness of Konrad Steiner, which was entered into the 26th Berlin International Film Festival.

== Selected filmography ==
- Hinter den sieben Gleisen (1959), as Paul Eberhard
- Stage Fright (1960), as Thomas Crusius
- Tread Softly (1965), as Percy
- No Shooting Time for Foxes (1966), as the main character
- Murderers Club of Brooklyn (1967), as Bryan Dyers
- St. Pauli Between Night and Morning (1967), as Helmut
- Beyond Control (1968, director), as Kurt Sandweg
- Köpfchen in das Wasser, Schwänzchen in die Höh’ (1969, director), as Berger
- Love, Vampire Style (1970, director)
- The Moonstone (1974, TV film), as Godfrey Ablewhite
- The Sudden Loneliness of Konrad Steiner (1976), as Peter
- Akte Grüninger (2013), as Valentin Keel
