= Jerry Cotton =

- First appearance: "Ich suchte den Gangster-Chef" (I Sought the Gang Boss, 1954)
- Created by: Delfried Kaufmann
- Portrayed by: George Nader (1965–69); Christian Tramitz (2007)

In-universe information
- Gender: Male
- Occupation: FBI Agent
- Affiliation: Phil Decker
- Nationality: American

Jerry Cotton is the title character of a series of German-language pulp crime novels. The novels have been penned by many different writers in German-speaking countries and in Finland through eight decades of publication.

== Overview ==
The novels center around the adventures of FBI agent Jerry Cotton, which take place in and around New York City. It was created by Delfried Kaufmann. In 1954 the first novel appeared as no. 68: "Ich suchte den Gangster-Chef" ("I Sought the Gang Boss") in the series Bastei Kriminalroman. The pseudonym "Jerry Cotton" was developed in 1956 and the first novella with this name on the front page appeared with the title "Ich jagte den Diamanten-Hai" ("I hunted the Diamond Shark"). In 2014, the series reached the 3000th issue, "Goodbye New York!". In 2022, it reached the 3400th issue, "Bloody Legacy". The series sold approximately 930 million copies.

In Finnish versions of Jerry Cotton, he is said to have been born and raised on a farm in Harpersville, Connecticut. There is also some reference to his father having been a blacksmith or Jerry himself having been a blacksmith's apprentice before joining the police academy.

A group of over 100 authors write for the series, sold in many kiosks and over newsagents. Rolf Kalmuczak, who was a major author behind the series, wrote for it as "Stefan Wolf".

In addition to Cotton, major figures in the series include his partner Phil Decker, FBI-chief John D. High, veteran agent Neville, Annie Geraldo, Zeerookah, June Clark, Roby O'Hara, Myrna, Windermeere and his Smith & Wesson, a 38 Caliber Smith & Wesson Special. Jerry Cotton drives a red Jaguar E-type, built in 1966.

Several Jerry Cotton novels were adapted as radio plays.

One of the few official FBI pages in German states that Jerry Cotton indeed is a fictional agent and therefore it does not make sense to write fan letters to him.

== Authors ==
Notable authors who confirmed writing for the Jerry Cotton series include:

- Heinz Werner Höber
- Thomas Jeier (= Christopher Ross)
- Rolf Kalmuczak
- Walter Appel
- Martin Barkawitz
- Horst Friedrichs
- Friedrich Jankuba
- Delfried Kaufmann
- Jorg Layes
- Helmut Rellergert
- Friedrich Tenkrat
- Manfred Weinland

== Jerry Cotton films ==
Starting in the 1960s, a series of eight films based on the Cotton novels were made, the first four in black-and-white, the last four in color. The character of Jerry Cotton was played by American actor George Nader, and his companion Phil Decker was played by the German actor Heinz Weiß. The director of the films was Harald Reinl. The film's music was composed by Peter Thomas including the "Jerry Cotton March", that also was released on a soundtrack-single. In the 1990s the soundtracks of the movies were re-released on CDs.

- Tread Softly (1965)
- Manhattan Night of Murder (1965)
- Tip Not Included (1966)
- The Trap Snaps Shut at Midnight (1966)
- Murderers Club of Brooklyn (1967)
- Death in the Red Jaguar (1968)
- Death and Diamonds (1968)
- Dead Body on Broadway (1969)

In 2007, Constantin Film AG and Rat Pack Filmproduktion released a new German feature film titled Jerry Cotton, directed by Cyrill Boss and Philipp Stennert, starring Christian Tramitz as the protagonist, Christian Ulmen as Phil Decker, Mónica Cruz as the leading lady and Christiane Paul, Heino Ferch and Moritz Bleibtreu as their counterparts. The film met general expectations by gaining a lot of new attention for Jerry Cotton and the classic series of novels.

== See also ==
- FBI portrayal in media
