= Monika Grimm =

German singer and actress (born 1940)

Monika Grimm (born 18 May 1940, in Schönfels bei Zwickau) is a German pop singer and actress.
