= Christian Ulmen =

German television presenter and actor

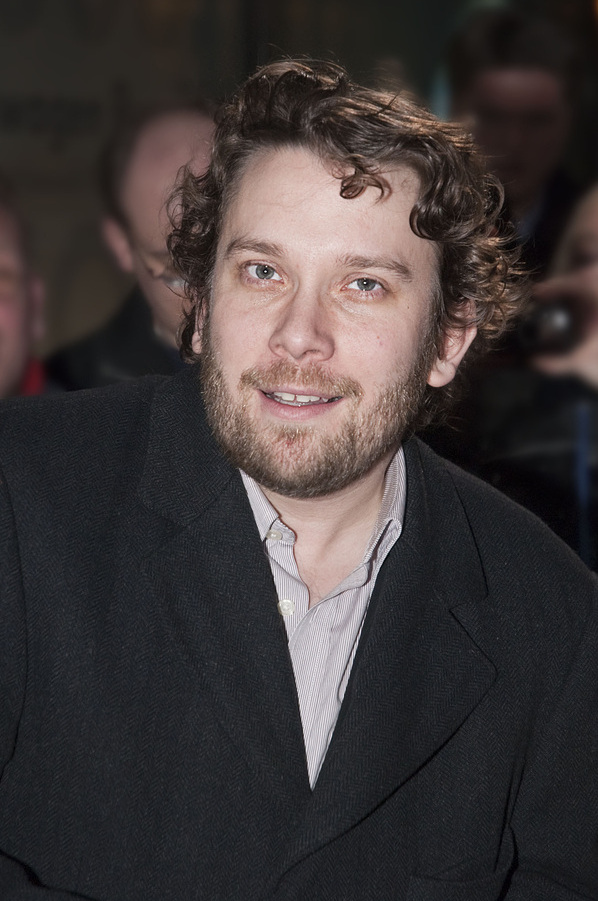
- Ulmen in 2008
- Born: 22 September 1975 (age 51); Neuwied, West Germany
- Occupations: Actor, entertainer, presenter
- Spouses: Huberta Ulmen (m. 2005; div. 2010) Collien Fernandes (m. 2011; div. 2026)
- Children: 2

Christian Ulmen (born 22 September 1975) is a German television presenter, actor, entertainer, voice actor, narrator, filmmaker and businessman.

== Career ==
From 2013 to 2021, Ulmen and Nora Tschirner played a team of investigators who also happen to be a couple, in the Weimar-based episodes of the Tatort series.

== Personal life ==
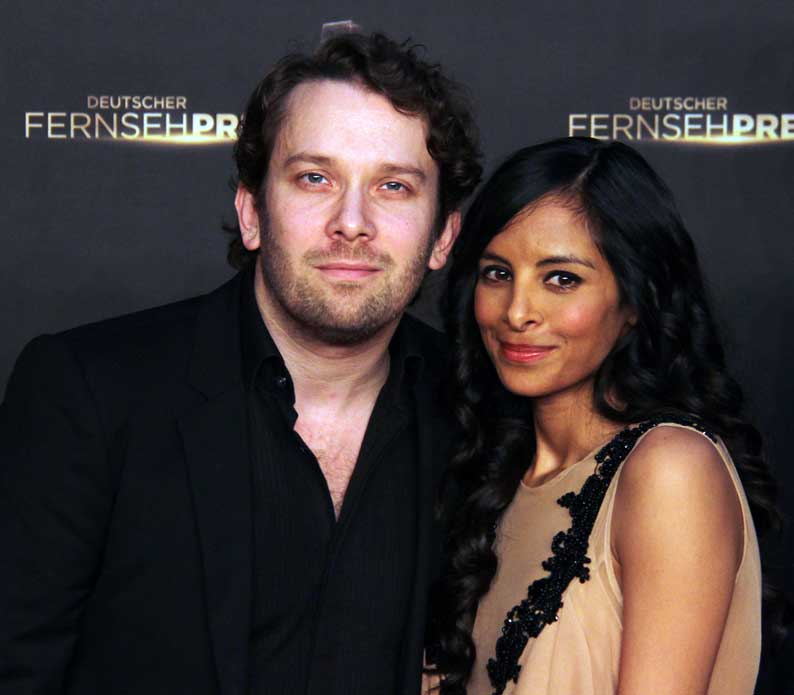
Ulmen with his ex-wife Collien Fernandes in 2012

Ulmen met his first wife Huberta in 1999 and they eventually married in 2005. They have a son together, but divorced in 2010. In August 2010, Ulmen met Collien Fernandes and the couple married on 22 June 2011. They welcomed their daughter in April 2012. In September 2025, the couple announced their separation, and in March 2026, their divorce.

In March 2026, Der Spiegel reported that Fernandes had filed a complaint against Ulmen with the district court in Palma, alleging, among other things, identity theft, public defamation, and assault. He is alleged to have created fake social media accounts in her name over the course of several years to distribute fake nude photos and videos of her; she felt "virtually raped". Ulmen hired media lawyer Christian Schertz to take legal action against Der Spiegel. Schertz considers the reporting unlawful because it spreads "untrue facts based on a one-sided account". Without commenting on the validity of the allegations in this specific case, Federal Minister of Justice Stefanie Hubig, in response to the publication of the allegations against Ulmen, spoke out about existing gaps in criminal liability and called for harsher punishment for perpetrators of digital violence.

== Selected filmography ==
- Berlin Blues (2003), as Herr Lehmann
- The Fisherman and His Wife (2005), as Otto
- Atomised (2006), as Michael Djerzinski
- FC Venus (2006), as Paul
- Dr. Psycho (2007–2008, TV series, 14 episodes), as Dr. Max Munzl
- Schade um das schöne Geld (2008, TV film), as Bruno Karras
- Men in the City (2009), as Günther Stobanski
- Jerry Cotton (2010), as Phil Decker
- Hochzeitspolka (2010), as Frieder Schulz
- Vater Morgana (2010), as Lutz Stielike
- Jonas (2011), as Jonas
- Don't You Believe It! (2012), as Georg
- Tatort (since 2013, TV series, 9 episodes), as Kommissar Lessing
- Everything Is Love (2014), as Viktor
- Beck's Last Summer (2015), as Robert Beck
- Macho Man (2015), as Daniel Hagenberger

== Audiobooks (excerpt) ==
- 2010 (Audible): Douglas Adams: Per Anhalter durch die Galaxis (The Hitchhiker’s Guide to the Galaxy), publisher: der Hörverlag, ISBN 978-3867173698
- 2011: Ian McEwan: Psychopolis, publisher: Diogenes Hörbuch, ISBN 978-3257800777
