= Constantin Film =

German film production company

Constantin Film AG
- Type: Subsidiary (Aktiengesellschaft)
- Industry: Film production
- Founded: 1 April 1950; 76 years ago, Frankfurt, West Germany (Original Constantin); 1978; 48 years ago (New Constantin)
- Founder: Waldfried Barthel; Preben Philipsen
- Defunct: 1977; 49 years ago (Original Constantin)
- Fate: Bankruptcy (Original Constantin)
- Headquarters: Munich, Germany
- Key people: Martin Moszkowicz; Bernd Eichinger (d. 2011); Oliver Berben
- Revenue: €267 million (2017)
- Number of employees: 829 (December 2017)
- Parent: Highlight Communications
- Divisions: Constantin Television; Constantin Entertainment; Constantin Music; Constantin Digital Media; Constantin Animation
- Subsidiaries: Moovie; Mythos Film Produktions GmbH & Co. KG; Rat Pack Filmproduktion; Hager Moss Film; Olga Film; Alpenrot; Mister Smith Entertainment (minority stake)
- Website: constantin.film

Constantin Film AG is a German film production and distribution company based in Munich. The company, which belongs to Swiss media conglomerate Highlight Communications AG, is a large independent German maker and distributor of productions.

As of 2019, Constantin had released 36 of the 100 most successful German films of the previous 20 years, including four of the top five: Manitou's Shoe, Traumschiff Surprise – Periode 1, Fack ju Göhte and Fack ju Göhte 2. The Fack ju Göhte trilogy was concluded in 2017 with Fack ju Göhte 3, becoming the most successful German film series of all time.

Internationally, Constantin Film is best known for the commercially successful Resident Evil film franchise, which had earned US$1.2 billion worldwide by May 2017 and was also known as the highest-grossing film series based on a video game. More recently, TV series include Shadowhunters, which won four People's Choice Awards in 2018, and the live-action Resident Evil television series. Constantin has also been involved in 20th Century Fox and Marvel Studios's Fantastic Four film franchise. Other productions include bestseller adaptation The Silence and video game adaptation Monster Hunter.

In October 2021, Constantin films formed a partnership with Upgrade Productions, which aims to develop and produce quality local-language productions for a worldwide audience, in collaboration with Bron Releasing, which became its sales and distribution arm.

== Original Constantin ==
Constantin Filmverleih GmbH was founded in West Germany on 1 April 1950 by Preben Philipsen and Waldfried Barthel, who would later become the head of publicity for the company. It was originally the country's national distributor of films produced by Columbia Pictures and United Artists. Throughout the 1950s, Constantin distributed both popular and art-house films from several nations as well as medium-budgeted domestic films.

Constantin's popularity grew through the late 1950s to the 1960s by not only distributing popular films but creating its own in-house talent roster of contract players (Joachim Fuchsberger, Heinz Drache), directors and producers (Wolf C. Hartwig), as well as co-financing international co-production films shot in Italy, such as the Clint Eastwood spaghetti westerns, the films of Harry Alan Towers and others using their own stable of stars. Constantin also had great success with their Jerry Cotton film series, though projected film series of Sherlock Holmes, Jules Maigret and Perry Rhodan only had one entry.

Constantin Filmverleih was renamed to Constantin Film GmbH on 21 September 1964, and on 1 July 1965, Bertelsmann Publishing became the majority shareholder of Constantin. They attempted to increase output without increasing investment that resulted in the demise of many of the studio's popular film series, investment in sex films, and a stronger emphasis on releasing films from other nations rather than shooting their own. Bertelsmann sold its shares in 1969. The "old" Constantin Film GmbH was eventually declared bankrupt in October 1977.

== New Constantin ==
Founded in 1978 by Bernd Eichinger, with Bernd Schaefers, as Neue Constantin Film after acquiring the assets of the bankrupt "old" Constantin Film GmbH the previous year, Constantin Film developed into the first German film distributor with its own production company in just six years, with production activities extending to the international market. In 1986, the Kirch Group (at the time Europe's biggest film and TV license traders) acquired a minority stake in Neue Constantin Film. Eichinger retained one of the company's leading executives and a major shareholder to his death in 2011. In 1990, the company, along with Regency Enterprises and Cinergi Pictures had started a venture, The Summit Group, its stake was sold off in 1994 and became Summit Entertainment.

In the following years, Constantin Film fixed its position on the international movie market by establishing various production subsidiaries across Europe in 1996. At the end of the 1990s, Constantin Film acquired majority stakes in the film production companies Olga Film GmbH, Engram Pictures and MOOVIE GmbH.

In August 1999, EM.TV & Merchandising acquired a 25% stake in Constantin Film alongside its 51% stake in Olga Film, marking EM.TV's entry into the feature film business and increasing their family entertainment business.

A month later in September 1999, the company then went public on the German stock market as Constantin Film AG. Deutsche Börse placed the Constantin Film share on the selection index Nemax 50 in March 2000. In 2000, the company partnered with American producer Propaganda Films to start ProCon Films, the venture was quickly dissolved in October 2001.

Constantin Film AG founded Rat Pack Filmproduktion GmbH with producer Christian Becker and his team in 2001. The Swiss Highlight Communications AG (a strategy and finance holding with the operative segments of film and sports and event marketing) acquired 23 percent of the capital stock of Constantin Film AG from Kirch Beteiligungs GmbH und Co. KG and from diversified holdings for the first time in 2002. In 2003, the board of Constantin Film AG embarked on a new strategic path for the company: the traditional business areas of production and distribution were expanded to include the three areas of license trading, home entertainment exploitation and increased TV service production (especially TV entertainment). Constantin Film AG also acquired 61 percent of the shares in KirchMedia Entertainment GmbH (now renamed Constantin Entertainment GmbH), one of the market leaders in German show and entertainment production. The stake was increased to 100 percent in 2005.

At the end of 2009, the listing of Constantin Film AG expired; all the shares were transferred to Highlight Communications after a squeeze-out. As of 7 October 2009, Constantin Film was no longer listed at the Frankfurter Börse.

In September 2012, Constantin Film increased its international production efforts by joining forces with Scandinavian film & television producer and former ZDF Enterprises executive Peter Nadermann to establish a new German film & television production subsidiary based in Colonge that would expand Constantin Film's international production base and strengthen its portfolio of high-quality television programming and feature films entitled Nadcon Film, the new subsidiary Nadcon Film had been specifically created to develop and produce high-end international drama, crime series, and the "Nordic Noir" genre for the international and German markets with Peter Nadermann serving as MD of the new subsidiary.

In January 2017 Bernhard Burgener was appointed chairman of the supervisory board, with Martin Moszkowicz as chairman of the executive board. In this capacity, Moszkowicz is responsible for the company's film business, including worldwide production and distribution, world sales, marketing and publicity as well as corporate communication and legal affairs.

Oliver Berben joined the Constantin Film AG Managing Board on 1 January 2017. The newly-created division TV, Entertainment and Digital Media concentrates the development and manufacture of all national and international productions of the company that are not intended for cinema exploitation. Berben founded the MOOVIE GmbH in 1996, which became a subsidiary of Constantin Film AG in 1999.

In June 2018, Constantin Film had announced that they had acquired Munich-based drama television production company Hager Moss Film.

In January 2019, Berben assumed the position of "managing director production" of Constantin Film Production GmbH, at the same time continuing his work as a producer. On 28 January 2019, Constantin Film had sold a 49% stake in its Colonge-based German film & television production subsidiary Nadcon Film to ZDF Enterprises, the commercial & production/distribution division of German broadcasting network ZDF

On 12 October 2021, former Disney Plus and Netflix executive Matt Brodlie and former president of Sierra/Affinity Jonathan Kier co-founded Upgrade Productions, based in Los Angeles. The new company also formed a partnership with Bron Releasing, aiming to develop and produce quality local-language productions for a worldwide audience. It would finance projects in Eastern Europe, Latin America, and Japan. In November 2021, Bron appointed Kier as president of Bron sales, marketing and distribution arm

In October 2021, the Writers Guild of America West advised its members not to work for the company due it not being a signatory to the 2020 Minimum Basic Agreement. However, the company said that it had paid all WGA fringe payments, which had been accepted by the WGA.

In July 2023, Netflix and Constantin signed an exclusive long-term partnership.

=== Productions ===
The most successful license titles and internal or co-productions in Germany include (in terms of numbers of viewers) The Never Ending Story (approx. 5 million), The Name of the Rose (5.9 million), The House of the Spirits (nearly 4 million), Dances With Wolves (nearly 6.8 million), Seven (more than 2.8 million), The Sixth Sense (more than 4 million), Maybe... Maybe Not (more than 6.6 million), Werner – Beinhart! (more than 4.9 million), Rossini (more than 3.2 million), Ballermann 6 (more than 2.4 million), Asterix & Obelix vs. Caesar (nearly 3.6 million), Werner – Volles Rooäää!!! (nearly 2.8 million), American Pie (more than 6 million viewers, the biggest film of 2000), Downfall (more than 4.6 million viewers. Oscar-nominated), Perfume: The Story of a Murderer (nearly 5.6 million), The Baader-Meinhof Complex (more than 2.4 million), Manitou's Shoe (the second-most successful German film ever with more than 11.7 million viewers), Dreamship Surprise – Period 1 (9 million), Lissi and the Wild Emperor (more than 2.2 million), Vicky the Viking (nearly 5 million), Nowhere in Africa (1.66 million viewers. Oscar winner for "Best Foreign Language Film" in 2003), The Wave (more than 2.5 Mio), Hui Buh (more than 2 million), The White Massai (more than 2.2. million), Männersache (1.8 million), Horst Schlämmer – Isch kandidiere! (1.35 million), Wedding Fever in Campobello (1.3 million), Pope Joan (2.3 million), the Wild Chicks series (3.2 million), Girls on Top (nearly 1.8 million), Turkish for Beginners (2.4 million), Suck me Shakespeer (7.3 million) and the international self-production Resident Evil (3.6 million viewers), which developed into a successful international franchise.

== Filmographies ==
=== List of content produced by The Original Constantin Film ===
- The Goddess of Rio Beni (1950)
- The Guilt of Doctor Homma (1951)
- Veronika the Maid (1951)
- Gangsterpremiere (1951)
- Im Banne der Madonna (1951)
- My Friend the Thief (1951)
- Hello Porter (1952)
- My Wife Is Being Stupid (1952)
- Ideal Woman Sought (1952)
- Rose of the Mountain (1952)
- Die Fiakermilli (1953)
- Josef the Chaste (1953)
- Das war unser Rommel (1953)
- The Charming Young Lady (1953)
- The Daughter of the Regiment (1953)
- Hooray, It's a Boy! (1953)
- The Great Test (1954)
- Rose-Girl Resli (1954)
- Love Is Forever (1954)
- The Seven Dresses of Katrin (1954)
- Der schweigende Engel (1954)
- The Beginning Was Sin (1954)
- The Beautiful Miller (1954)
- Verliebte Leute (1954)
- The Ambassador's Wife (1955)
- Doctor Solm (1955)
- Love Without Illusions (1955)
- Sacred Lie (1955)
- Son Without a Home (1955)
- The Priest from Kirchfeld (1955)
- Wenn der Vater mit dem Sohne (1955)
- I Was an Ugly Girl (1955)
- Love Is Just a Fairytale (1955)
- When the Alpine Roses Bloom (1955)
- My Leopold (1955)
- Roman einer Siebzehnjährigen (1955)
- Yes, Yes, Love in Tyrol (1955)
- Charley's Aunt (1956)
- Crown Prince Rudolph's Last Love (1956)
- Studentin Helene Willfüer (1956)
- Die Fischerin vom Bodensee (1956)
- Der Glockengießer von Tirol (1956)
- Wenn Poldi ins Manöver zieht (1956)
- Was die Schwalbe sang (1956)
- Johannisnacht (1956)
- Die Christel von der Post (1956)
- As Long as the Roses Bloom (1956)
- Like Once Lili Marleen (1956)
- My Husband's Getting Married Today (1956)
- The Beggar Student (1956)
- Flucht in die Tropennacht (1957)
- Die Lindenwirtin vom Donaustrand (1957)
- Kleiner Mann – ganz groß (1957)
- Die Unschuld vom Lande (1957)
- Salzburg Stories (1957)
- The Fox of Paris (1957)
- The Girl Without Pyjamas (1957)
- The Last Ones Shall Be First (1957)
- Different from You and Me (1957)
- The Count of Luxemburg (1957)
- The Daring Swimmer (1957)
- The Legs of Dolores (1957)
- Die Prinzessin von St. Wolfgang (1957)
- The Twins from Zillertal (1957)
- Gruß und Kuß vom Tegernsee (1957)
- Wetterleuchten um Maria (1957)
- Für zwei Groschen Zärtlichkeit (1957)
- And Lead Us Not Into Temptation (1957)
- Girls of the Night (1958)
- The Green Devils of Monte Cassino (1958)
- Il bacio del sole (Don Vesuvio) (1958)
- Aren't We Wonderful? (1958)
- The Spessart Inn (1958)
- The Csardas King (1958)
- Mein Mädchen ist ein Postillion (1958)
- Wenn die Conny mit dem Peter (1958)
- My Sweetheart Is from Tyrol (1958)
- U 47 – Kapitänleutnant Prien (1958)
- Gräfin Mariza (1958)
- A Song Goes Round the World (1958)
- I'll Carry You in My Arms (1958)
- The Man Who Couldn't Say No (1958)
- When She Starts, Look Out (1958)
- Here I Am, Here I Stay (1959)
- The Angel Who Pawned Her Harp (1959)
- For the First Time (1959)
- Mandolins and Moonlight (1959)
- The Treasure of San Teresa (1959)
- Der Frosch mit der Maske (1959)
- Ich bin kein Casanova (1959)
- Ja, so ein Mädchen mit sechzehn (1959)
- Mein Schatz komm mit ans blaue Meer (1959)
- The Merry War of Captain Pedro (1959)
- Freddy unter fremden Sternen (1959)
- Kein Mann zum Heiraten (1959)
- The Beautiful Adventure (1959)
- The Crimson Circle (1960)
- We Will Never Part (1960)
- Stage Fright (1960)
- Yes, Women are Dangerous (1960)
- My Niece Doesn't Do That (1960)
- Conny and Peter Make Music (1960)
- The Terrible People (1960)
- Do Not Send Your Wife to Italy (1960)
- Until Money Departs You (1960)
- Mal drunter – mal drüber (1960)
- Gauner-Serenade (1960)
- Die Brücke des Schicksals (1960)
- The White Horse Inn (1960)
- The Haunted Castle (1960)
- The Red Hand (1960)
- Agatha, Stop That Murdering! (1960)
- Escape to Berlin (1961)
- The Forger of London (1961)
- The Green Archer (1961)
- Mariandl (1961)
- The Strange Countess (1961)
- World in My Pocket (1961)
- The Inn on the River (1962)
- When the Music Plays at Wörthersee (1962)
- The Sweet Life of Count Bobby (1962)
- Terror After Midnight (1962)
- Mariandl's Homecoming (1962)
- The Invisible Dr. Mabuse (1962)
- The Merry Widow (1962)
- Sherlock Holmes and the Deadly Necklace (1962)
- Snow White and the Seven Jugglers (1962)
- Death Drums Along the River (1963)
- The Model Boy (1963)
- Homesick for St. Pauli (1963)
- Love Has to Be Learned (1963)
- Charley's Aunt (1963)
- The White Spider (1963)
- Golden Goddess of Rio Beni (1964)
- A Fistful of Dollars (1964)
- Bullets Don't Argue (1964)
- The Curse of the Hidden Vault (1964)
- The Inn on Dartmoor (1964)
- Massacre at Marble City (1964)
- Traitor's Gate (1964)
- Freddy, Tiere, Sensationen (1964)
- Tim Frazer (1964)
- The World Revolves Around You (1964)
- Black Eagle of Santa Fe (1965)
- Manhattan Night of Murder (1965)
- The Last Tomahawk (1965)
- Seven Hours of Gunfire (1965)
- Tread Softly (1965)
- The Face of Fu Manchu (1965)
- In Bed by Eight (1965)
- For a Few Dollars More (1965)
- Heidi (1965)
- The Oil Prince (1965)
- Old Surehand (1965)
- Red Dragon (1965)
- The Sinister Monk (1965)
- Trunk to Cairo (1965)
- Circus of Fear (1966)
- Liselotte of the Palatinate (1966)
- The Trap Snaps Shut at Midnight (1966)
- Tip Not Included (1966)
- The Pipes (1966)
- The Fountain of Love (1966)
- The Brides of Fu Manchu (1966)
- Requiem for a Secret Agent (1966)
- Maigret and His Greatest Case (1966)
- The Good, the Bad and the Ugly (1966)
- The Trygon Factor (1966)
- Murderers Club of Brooklyn (1967)
- When Ludwig Goes on Manoeuvres (1967)
- The Vengeance of Fu Manchu (1967)
- A Handful of Heroes (1967)
- Creature with the Blue Hand (1967)
- Next Year, Same Time (1967)
- Five Golden Dragons (1967)
- Mission Stardust (1967)
- Desert Commandos (1967)
- A Degree of Murder (1967)
- Grand Slam (1967)
- The Blood Demon (1967)
- The Great Happiness (1967)
- The Peking Medallion (1967)
- The College Girl Murders (1967)
- When Night Falls on the Reeperbahn (1967)
- The House of 1,000 Dolls (1967)
- Man, Pride and Vengeance (1967)
- The Heathens of Kummerow (1967)
- Lust for Love (1967)
- The Smooth Career (1967)
- Darling Caroline (1968)
- Death and Diamonds (1968)
- The Hound of Blackwood Castle (1968)
- Emma Hamilton (1968)
- Death in the Red Jaguar (1968)
- The Blood of Fu Manchu (1968)
- Helga and Michael (1968)
- Angel Baby (1968)
- The Duck Rings at Half Past Seven (1968)
- The Long Day of Inspector Blomfield (1968)
- Morning's at Seven (1968)
- Sugar Bread and Whip (1968)
- Therese and Isabelle (1968)
- 24 Hour Lover (1968)
- Up the Establishment (1969)
- Double Face (1969)
- House of Pleasure (1969)
- When Sweet Moonlight Is Sleeping in the Hills (1969)
- The Man with the Glass Eye (1969)
- On the Reeperbahn at Half Past Midnight (1969)
- Dorian Gray (1970)
- The Bird with the Crystal Plumage (1970)
- We Two (1970)
- That Can't Shake Our Willi! (1970)
- The Captain (1971)
- Holiday Report (1971)
- Jailbreak in Hamburg (1971)
- My Father, the Ape and I (1971)
- Love Is Only a Word (1971)
- Office Girls (1971)
- Twenty Girls and the Teachers (1971)
- The Deadly Avenger of Soho (1972)
- Nurse Report (1972)
- Cry of the Black Wolves (1972)
- Blue Blooms the Gentian (1973)
- The Twins from Immenhof (1973)
- The Girl from Hong Kong (1973)
- The East Frisian Report (1973)
- The Bloody Vultures of Alaska (1973)
- The Countess Died of Laughter (1973)
- Old Barge, Young Love (1973)
- Spring in Immenhof (1974)
- Sabine (1974)
- Only the Wind Knows the Answer (1974)
- The Hunter of Fall (1974)
- Der Lord von Barmbeck (1974)
- Wer stirbt schon gerne unter Palmen (1974)
- When Mother Went on Strike (1974)
- End of the Game (1975)
- The Maddest Car in the World (1975)
- The Secret Carrier (1975)
- To the Bitter End (1975)
- Der Edelweißkönig (1975)
- The Last Word (1975)
- Schulmädchen-Report 9 (1975)
- Crime After School (1975)
- Hugs and Other Things (1975)
- The Mimosa Wants to Blossom Too (1976)
- Dear Fatherland Be at Peace (1976)
- Three Bavarians in Bangkok (1976)
- Anita Drögemöller und die Ruhe an der Ruhr (1976)
- Everyone Dies Alone (1976)
- Queen Kong (1976)
- The Clown (1976)
- Rosemary's Daughter (1976)
- Silence in the Forest (1976)
- The Elixirs of the Devil (1976)
- To the Devil a Daughter (1976)
- MitGift (1976)
- Cross of Iron (1977)
- Schulmädchen-Report 11. (1977)
- Maiden's War (1977)
- Waldrausch (1977)
- Johnny West (1977)

=== List of content produced by New Constantin Film ===
- Autumn Sonata (1978)
- Schulmädchen-Report 12. (1978)
- The Greatest Battle (1978)
- The Fifth Commandment (1978)
- The Man in the Rushes (1978)
- The Uranium Conspiracy (1978)
- Breakthrough (1979)
- It Can Only Get Worse (1979)
- Goetz von Berlichingen of the Iron Hand (1979)
- Sunnyboy und Sugarbaby (1979)
- Tales from the Vienna Woods (1979)
- Womanlight (1979)
- Christiane F. – We Children from Bahnhof Zoo (1982)
- Gib Gas – Ich will Spass (1983)
- The Roaring Fifties (1983)
- The NeverEnding Story (1984)
- The Name of the Rose (1986)
- Last Exit to Brooklyn (1989)
- Werner – Beinhart! (1990)
- The House of the Spirits (1993, co-produced with Costa do Castelo)
- The Fantastic Four (1994, unreleased)
- Der Bewegte Mann (1994)
- The Superwife (1996)
- Werner: Eat My Dust!!! (1996)
- Smilla's Sense of Snow (1997)
- Werner – Volles Rooäää!!! (1999)
- Ants in the Pants (2000)
- Der Schuh des Manitu (Manitou's Shoe, 2001)
- Bandits (2001)
- Emil and the Detectives (2001)
- Mädchen, Mädchen (2001)
- Resident Evil (2002)
- Wrong Turn (2003)
- Werner – Gekotzt wird später! (2003)
- Mädchen, Mädchen 2 – Loft oder Liebe (2004)
- Resident Evil: Apocalypse (2004)
- Downfall (German: Der Untergang) (2004)
- Fantastic Four (2005)
- The Dark (2005)
- Before the Fall (2005)
- Wild Chicks (2005)
- Perfume: The Story of a Murderer (German: Das Parfüm – Die Geschichte eines Mörders) (2006)
- Fantastic Four: Rise of the Silver Surfer (2007)
- Resident Evil: Extinction (2007)
- Wild Chicks in Love (2007)
- Wrong Turn 2: Dead End (2007)
- Pornorama (2007)
- The Baader-Meinhof Complex (German: Der Baader Meinhof Komplex) (2008)
- The Wave (2008)
- The Crocodiles (2009)
- Pandorum (2009)
- The Wild Chicks and Life (2009)
- Pope Joan (German: Die Päpstin) (2009)
- Resident Evil: Afterlife (2010)
- Time You Change (Biographical drama) (2010)
- Animals United (2010)
- The Crocodiles Strike Back (2010)
- We Are the Night (2010)
- Paranormal Activity 3 (2011)
- The Three Musketeers (2011)
- The Crocodiles: All for One (2011)
- Werner – Eiskalt! (2011)
- Resident Evil: Retribution (2012)
- Famous Five (2012)
- Heiter bis Wolkig (Fair to Cloudy, 2012)
- Tarzan (2013)
- The Mortal Instruments: City of Bones (2013)
- 3096 Days (2013)
- Fack ju Göhte (2013)
- Pompeii (2014)
- Love, Rosie (2014)
- Wrecked (2014)
- Fantastic Four (2015)
- Fack ju Göhte 2 (2015)
- Look Who's Back (2015)
- Shadowhunters (2016)
- Gut zu Vögeln (2016)
- Resident Evil: The Final Chapter (2016)
- Timm Thaler oder Das verkaufte Lachen (2017)
- Tigergirl (2017)
- Axolotl Overkill (2017)
- Teenosaurus Rex (2017)
- Windstorm 3: Windstorm and the Wild Horses (2017)
- Grießnockerlaffäre (2017)
- Tigermilch (2017)
- Godless Youth (2017)
- Fack ju Göhte 3 (2017)
- This Crazy Heart (2017)
- Only God Can Judge Me (2018)
- Fünf Freunde und das Tal der Dinosaurier (2018)
- Verpiss Dich, Schneewittchen! (2018)
- Sauerkrautkoma (2018)
- Asphaltgorillas (2018)
- How About Adolf? (2018)
- Eine ganz heiße Nummer 2.0 (2019)
- Leberkäsjunkie (2019)
- Die drei !!! (2019)
- Windstorm 4: Ari's Arrival (2019)
- Cherry Blossoms and Demons (2019)
- The Collini Case (2019)
- Polar (2019)
- Berlin, Berlin (2019)
- The Silence (2019)
- The Perfect Secret (2019)
- Haven – Above Sky (2020)
- Dragon Rider (2020)
- Black Beauty (2020)
- Monster Hunter (2020)
- Contra (2020)
- Wrong Turn (2021)
- Tides (2021)
- Resident Evil: Welcome to Raccoon City (2021)
- Mia and Me: The Hero of Centopia (2022)
- Sky Racers (2023)
- Boy Kills World (2024)
- September 5 (2024)
- In the Lost Lands (2025)
- The Fantastic Four: First Steps (2025, uncredited)
- Regretting You (2025)
- Good Luck, Have Fun, Don't Die (2026)
- Psycho Killer (2026)
- Resident Evil (2026)
- Beware Boiúna (2026)
