= Peter Thomas (composer) =

German composer and arranger (1925–2020)

- Born: 1 December 1925; Breslau, Silesia, Weimar Germany
- Died: 17 May 2020 (aged 94); Lugano, Switzerland
- Occupations: Composer of film scores; Bandleader
- Organizations: Peter Thomas Sound Orchestra

Peter Thomas (1 December 1925 – 17 May 2020) was a German composer and arranger with an active career of more than 50 years. He was known for his TV and film soundtracks such as Raumpatrouille, the Edgar Wallace movies film series, and the Jerry Cotton film series.

== Life ==
Thomas was born in Breslau, Silesia. In the 1950s, he played as a musician for the RIAS broadcaster, typically live.

The restored Brandenburg Gate in Berlin was re-opened in 2002 with a live performance of the main theme of the Raumpatrouille soundtrack.

In his directorial debut, Confessions of a Dangerous Mind (2002), actor George Clooney used three tracks of Peter Thomas' music originally composed for Edgar Wallace movies of the 1960s (in their original mono versions). The 1990s avant-garde band Mr. Bungle performed his piece "Love In Space" on several dates of their 1995/1996 tour for Disco Volante. UK Plunderphonics and avant-garde band, The Perrinormal, name Peter Thomas as one of their main influences, alongside John Barry and Lalo Schifrin.

For some of his exceptional scores, Thomas used a self-developed musical instrument called "ThoWiephon", today being exhibited in the Deutsches Museum in Munich, placed near the famous Theremin. It has been used in many movies.

Peter Thomas died on 17 May 2020 in Lugano.

== Films ==
- Moonwolf (Zurück aus dem Weltall, 1959)
- Escape to Berlin (Flucht nach Berlin, 1961)
- The Strange Countess (Die seltsame Gräfin, 1961)
- The Puzzle of the Red Orchid (Das Rätsel der roten Orchidee, 1961)
- Only a Woman (Ich bin auch nur eine Frau, 1962)
- The Door with Seven Locks (Die Tür mit den sieben Schlössern, 1962)
- The Endless Night (Die endlose Nacht, 1963)
- An Alibi for Death (Ein Alibi zerbricht, 1963)
- The White Spider (Die weiße Spinne, 1963)
- The Squeaker (Der Zinker, 1963)
- The Indian Scarf (Das Indische Tuch, 1963)
- Stop Train 349 (Verspätung in Marienborn, 1964)
- Room 13 (Zimmer 13, 1964)
- The Ringer (Der Hexer, 1964)
- Traitor's Gate (Das Verrätertor, 1964)
- Uncle Tom's Cabin (Onkel Toms Hütte, 1965)
- The Last Tomahawk (Der letzte Mohikaner, 1965)
- Tread Softly / Operation Hurricane: Friday Noon (Schüsse aus dem Geigenkasten, 1965)
- Manhattan Night of Murder (Mordnacht in Manhattan, 1965)
- Winnetou and Old Firehand / Thunder at the Border (Winnetou und sein Freund Old Firehand, 1966 – Karl May film)
- The Trap Snaps Shut at Midnight (Um null Uhr schnappt die Falle zu, 1966)
- Playgirl (1966)
- Congress of Love (Der Kongreß amüsiert sich, 1966)
- The Hunchback of Soho (Der Bucklige von Soho, 1966)
- The Trygon Factor (Das Geheimnis der weißen Nonne, 1966)
- The Blood Demon / Castle of the Walking Dead / Pendulum / The Snake Pit and the Pendulum / The Snake Pit / The Torture Chamber of Dr. Sadism / The Torture Room (Die Schlangengrube und das Pendel, 1967 – all titles used for one and the same movie)
- Jack of Diamonds (Der Diamantenprinz, 1967)
- Murderers Club of Brooklyn (Der Mörderclub von Brooklyn, 1967)
- The Zombie Walks (Im Banne des Unheimlichen, 1967)
- The Hound of Blackwood Castle (Der Hund von Blackwood Castle, 1968)
- The Man with the Glass Eye (Der Mann mit dem Glasauge, 1968)
- Van de Velde: The Perfect Marriage (Van de Velde: Die vollkommene Ehe, 1968)
- Death and Diamonds (Dynamit in grüner Seide, 1968)
- The Gorilla of Soho (Der Gorilla von Soho, 1968)
- Babeck (1968, TV miniseries)
- Every Night of the Week (Van de Velde: Das Leben zu zweit – Sexualität in der Ehe, 1969)
- Hotel Royal (1969, TV film)
- Seventeen and Anxious (O Happy Day, 1970)
- The Females (Die Weibchen (1970)
- Under the Roofs of St. Pauli (1970)
- Chariots of the Gods (Erinnerungen an die Zukunft, 1970)
- Swedish Sin (Nach Stockholm der Liebe wegen, 1970)
- Angels with Burnt Wings (1970)
- Holiday Report (1971)
- Office Girls (1971)
- Our Willi Is the Best (Unser Willi ist der Beste, 1971)
- The Body in the Thames (Die Tote aus der Themse, 1971)
- The Big Boss 1971 (Die Todesfaust des Cheng Li, 1973)
- The Stuff That Dreams Are Made Of (Der Stoff, aus dem die Träume sind, 1972)
- Three Men in the Snow (Drei Männer im Schnee, 1974)
- Embassy of the Gods / Miracle of the Gods (Botschaft der Götter, 1976)
- Breakthrough (Steiner – Das eiserne Kreuz, 2. Teil, 1979)
