= Phil Decker =

- Jerry Cotton character
- Created by: Jerry Cotton (various authors including Rolf Kalmuczak & Heinz Werner Höber
- Portrayed by: Heinz Weiss (1965-69); Christian Ulmen (2007)

In-universe information
- Gender: Male
- Occupation: FBI Agent
- Affiliation: Jerry Cotton
- Nationality: American

Phil Decker is a fictional character in Heinz Werner Höber's Jerry Cotton novels. He is Cotton's sidekick and a fellow FBI agent.

Subsequently, he appeared in the films Manhattan Night of Murder (1965), Tread Softly (1965) and six other films starring George Nader as Jerry Cotton. In all these films he was portrayed by Heinz Weiss.

In 2010's ironic revival film Jerry Cotton he was played by the comedian Christian Ulmen.
