= Karl Spiehs =

Austrian film producer (1931–2022)

- Born: 20 February 1931; Ternitz, Austria
- Died: 27 January 2022 (aged 90)
- Occupation: Film producer
- Years active: 1961–2017

Karl Spiehs (20 February 1931 – 27 January 2022) was an Austrian film producer. He produced more than 160 films and television shows from 1961 to 2017. He was born in Blindendorf-Dunkelstein, Neunkirchen District, Austria.

Spiehs died on 27 January 2022, at the age of 90.

== Selected filmography ==
- Our Crazy Aunts (1961)
- Dance with Me Into the Morning (1962)
- And So to Bed (1963)
- With Best Regards (1963)
- Our Crazy Nieces (1963)
- Don't Fool with Me (1963)
- Is Geraldine an Angel? (1963)
- I Learned It from Father (1964)
- Our Crazy Aunts in the South Seas (1964)
- The Last Ride to Santa Cruz (1964)
- The World Revolves Around You (1964)
- The Fountain of Love (1966)
- Killer's Carnival (1966)
- Target for Killing (1966)
- Maigret and His Greatest Case (1966)
- Congress of Love (1966)
- How to Seduce a Playboy (1966)
- Blood at Sundown (1966)
- Hot Pavements of Cologne (1967)
- Always Trouble with the Teachers (1968)
- Help, I Love Twins (1969)
- Our Doctor is the Best (1969)
- When You're With Me (1970)
- When the Mad Aunts Arrive (1970)
- Aunt Trude from Buxtehude (1971)
- The Mad Aunts Strike Out (1971)
- Who Laughs Last, Laughs Best (1971)
- Rudi, Behave! (1971)
- The Reverend Turns a Blind Eye (1971)
- Bloody Friday (1972)
- Always Trouble with the Reverend (1972)
- Meine Tochter – Deine Tochter (1972)
- Cry of the Black Wolves (1972)
- Crazy – Completely Mad (1973)
- The Bloody Vultures of Alaska (1973)
- Trouble with Trixie (1973)
- Julia (1974)
- Alpine Glow in Dirndlrock (1974)
- Everyone Dies Alone (1976)
- Three Bavarians in Bangkok (1976)
- The Fruit is Ripe (1977)
- Three Swedes in Upper Bavaria (1977)
- Vanessa (1977)
- Popcorn and Ice Cream (1978)
- She's 19 and Ready (1979)
- Cola, Candy, Chocolate (1979)
- Devil Hunter (1980)
- Sadomania (1981)
- Bloody Moon (1981)
- Banana Joe (1982)
- Die Supernasen (1983)
- Sunshine Reggae in Ibiza (1983)
- Lethal Obsession (1987)
- Starke Zeiten (1988)
- Silence Like Glass (1989)
- Gummibärchen küßt man nicht (1989)
- Ein Schloß am Wörthersee (1990–1992, TV series)
- Fiorile (1993)
