= Willy Harlander =

German actor (1931–2000)

- Born: 30 April 1931; Regensburg, Bavaria, Germany
- Died: 20 April 2000 (aged 68); Munich, Bavaria, Germany
- Occupation: Actor
- Years active: 1960-2000 (film & TV)

Willy Harlander (1931–2000) was a German film and television actor. A regular on West German television, he also appeared in several Bavarian sex comedies during the 1970s.

== Filmography ==
Year	Title	Role	Notes
1960	My Schoolfriend	Briefträger, der Dr. Dorn seine Post bringt	Uncredited
1961	Der Hochtourist	Sepp Rainthaler	
1961	Les honneurs de la guerre	Hermann	
1967	A Degree of Murder		Uncredited
1967	Kurzer Prozess	Polizeibeamter Janisch	
1970	Student of the Bedroom	Möbelpacker	Uncredited
1970	The Sex Nest	Josef	
1971	Schulmädchen-Report - part 2	Taschner	Uncredited
1972	Don't Get Angry	Ratzig, Automechaniker	
1973	Schulmädchen-Report - part 5	Werner Kessler	Uncredited
1973	Blue Blooms the Gentian	Gamsler	Uncredited
1973	Was Schulmädchen verschweigen	Wimmer - Postmeister	Uncredited
1973	Crazy – Completely Mad	Einbrecher	Uncredited
1973	Geh, zieh dein Dirndl aus	Florian	Uncredited
1974	Alpine Glow in Dirndlrock	Sepp Ploderer	
1974	Zwei Rebläuse auf dem Weg zur Loreley	Sepp Brunnhöfer	
1974	Stolen Heaven	Revierinspektor	
1976	Three Bavarians in Bangkok	Sepp Ploderer	
1977	Lady Dracula	Taxifahrer	Uncredited
1977	Three Swedes in Upper Bavaria	1. Bayer	
1977	Die Jugendstreiche des Knaben Karl	Wirt	
1981	Lili Marleen	Prosel	
1982	Piratensender Power Play	Richter	
1982	Meister Eder und sein Pumuckl	'Schorsch' Bernbacher	
1984	Early Snow in Munich	Poldner	
1985	Die Einsteiger	Tankstellenpächter	
1989	Rosalie Goes Shopping	Rosalie's Father	
1991	Success	Lechner	
1992	Schtonk!	Bavarian customs officer	

== Bibliography ==
- Joachim Hess. Tatort A-Z: 40 Jahre Tatort - Referenzbuch mit Glossar 1970 - 2012. Epubli, 2012.
