= The Mad Aunts Strike Out =

1971 film

- Directed by: Franz Josef Gottlieb
- Written by: Erich Tomek
- Produced by: Karl Spiehs; Walter Traut
- Starring: Rudi Carrell; Ilja Richter; Mascha Gonska
- Cinematography: Heinz Hölscher
- Edited by: Traude Krappl-Maass
- Music by: Erwin Halletz
- Production companies: Divina-Film; Lisa Film
- Distributed by: Gloria Film
- Release date: 24 September 1971
- Running time: 95 minutes
- Country: West Germany
- Language: German

The Mad Aunts Strike Out (German: Die tollen Tanten schlagen zu) is a 1971 West German comedy film directed by Franz Josef Gottlieb and starring Rudi Carrell, Ilja Richter, and Mascha Gonska. It is part of a series of cross-dressing comedies inspired by Charley's Aunt and Some Like It Hot.

The film's sets were designed by Eberhard Schröder.

== Cast ==
- Rudi Carrell as Rudi Carnera
- Ilja Richter as Andy Braus
- Mascha Gonska as Eva Wiedemann
- Theo Lingen as Dr. Theo Schatz
- Hans Kraus as Hans Müller
- Gunther Philipp as Bruno Kargel
- Trude Herr as Trude Moll
- Klaus Wildbolz as Manfred Böll
- Elisabeth Krogh as Margit Wiedemann
- Margot Mahler as Guggi
- Jacques Herlin as Eddy Stubenrauch
- Gretl Schörg as Irene Wiedemann
- Hans Terofal
- Jane Tilden
- Marion Forster
- Bueno De Mesquita
- Daniel Gérard as Sänger
- Peter Orloff as Sänger
- Wolfgang as Sänger

== Bibliography ==
- Bock, Hans-Michael; Bergfelder, Tim, eds. (2009). The Concise Cinegraph: Encyclopaedia of German Cinema. New York: Berghahn Books. ISBN 978-1-57181-655-9.
