= Angelica Ott =

German actress

- Born: 14 June 1944 (age 81); Schwiebus, Prussia, Germany
- Other name: Angelika Ott
- Occupation: Actress
- Years active: 1966-1973 (film)

Angelica Ott (born 1944) is a former German film actress. She was married to the film producer Karl Spiehs and most of her performances were in films made by his company Lisa Film.

== Selected filmography ==
- Blood at Sundown (1966)
- Dollar of Fire (1966)
- Hot Pavements of Cologne (1967)
- The Seven Red Berets (1969)
- Help, I Love Twins (1969)
- When You're With Me (1970)
- Hotel by the Hour (1970)
- Aunt Trude from Buxtehude (1971)
- Rudi, Behave! (1971)
- Cry of the Black Wolves (1972)
- Crazy – Completely Mad (1973)
- The Bloody Vultures of Alaska (1973)

== Bibliography ==
- Peter Cowie & Derek Elley. World Filmography: 1967. Fairleigh Dickinson University Press, 1977.
