= Tante Trude aus Buxtehude =

1971 film

- Ilja Richter and Mascha Gonska
- Directed by: Franz Josef Gottlieb
- Written by: Erich Tomek
- Produced by: Karl Spiehs; Walter Traut
- Starring: Rudi Carrell; Ilja Richter; Theo Lingen
- Cinematography: Heinz Hölscher
- Edited by: Traude Krappl-Maass
- Music by: Gerhard Heinz
- Production companies: Divina Film; Lisa Film
- Distributed by: Gloria Film
- Release date: 15 April 1971
- Running time: 87 minutes
- Country: West Germany
- Language: German

Tante Trude aus Buxtehude ("Aunt Trude from Buxtehude") is a 1971 West German comedy film directed by Franz Josef Gottlieb and starring Rudi Carrell, Ilja Richter and Theo Lingen. It was one of several German films in the wake of the 1959 film Some Like It Hot that used cross-dressing as a comic theme.

The film's sets were designed by Eberhard Schröder. Some of the film was shot in the Austrian city of Salzburg. It features a number of songs performed by leading German Schlager music singers of the era.

== Synopsis ==
On her 21st birthday Gerda, a young student, is summoned by a solicitor who informs her that she has inherited one million Marks from a deceased aunt and will be presented with a suitcase later that day. When the suitcase is delivered to her apartment, Gerda and her friends Morits, Rudi and Karin are disappointed to find it does not contain the money, but a heap of old fashioned identical granny dresses, all looking the same. So she asks her friend Moritz, a gawky wannabe detective to sell them on to at least get some gain from her 'inheritance'. After Moritz trots off with the old dresses to sell them to a shop, the porter who previously delivered the case with the dresses comes back stating he had forgotten to deliver a letter which was part of the inheritance. The letter reveals that Gerda is indeed the beneficiary of the said inheritance, but to avoid any inheritance tax the money was placed in a bank deposit box in Austria and the key to that box sewn in one of these ten identical dresses.

Unknowingly of the events Moritz has already found the key and thoughtlessly put it in his pocket.

When he returns with the money he got for the dresses, the friends reveal the whole mess and all descend on the shop the dresses were sold to. However, the owner of the shop has already sold them on to a fashion store owner in Kitzbühel, Austria. So the friends rush off to Austria and try to locate the buyers of the dress who all reside in the castle hotel. They include an arrogant film star, a bad tempered mid aged woman with a dog, a lady who works at the hotel and the slightly gawky Bruno. The chase is on, partially in disguise, which causes lots of errors and confusion, to locate and to check every single dress without being too obvious. Nevertheless a thief learns about the inheritance and wants to grab it for himself. When the thief threatens the friends and demands the key, Moritz unknowingly hands him the real deposit box key which he had dismissed for being just some random key. The criminal heads off ready to claim the inheritance.

In the end Rudi, as well as the hotel director and a dim witted hotel page crossdress up as the deceased aunt Trude and appear at the bank directors office.

== Cast ==
- Rudi Carrell as Rudi
- Ilja Richter as Moritz
- Chris Roberts as Toni Hinteregger
- Theo Lingen as Pauli
- Elisabeth Krogh as Gerda Börner
- Mascha Gonska as Karin
- Alexander Grill as Sepp
- Doris Kirchner as Mrs. Geier
- Angelica Ott as Ricki
- Ann Smyrner as Loni Martell
- Raoul Retzer as Oskar
- Herbert Fux as Harry, the hotel thief
- Hans Terofal as Franz
- Rudolf Schündler as notary
- Ulrich Beiger as bank director
- Rainer Basedow as Bruno
- Edgar Wenzel as men with suitcase
- Jochen Busse as clothier
- Ralf Wolter as the caretaker
- Gunther Philipp as Dr. Leid, psychiatrist
- Toni Sailer as skiing world champion
- Dorothea Carrera as secretary
- Manuela as Sängerin
- Werner Abrolat as Mr. Preissen
- Ramona as singer in the 'Tenne'
- Bueno De Mesquita as Bueno

== See also ==
- Tante Jutta aus Kalkutta (1953)
- Tante Wanda aus Uganda (1957)

== Bibliography ==
- Bock, Hans-Michael; Bergfelder, Tim, eds. (2009). The Concise Cinegraph: Encyclopaedia of German Cinema. New York: Berghahn Books. ISBN 978-1-57181-655-9.
