= Three Swedes in Upper Bavaria =

- Directed by: Sigi Rothemund
- Written by: Erich Tomek; Sigi Rothemund
- Produced by: Karl Spiehs; Ilse Kubaschewski
- Starring: Gianni Garko; Alexander Grill; Beate Hasenau
- Cinematography: Franz Xaver Lederle
- Edited by: Mimi Werkmann; Eva Zeyn
- Music by: Gerhard Heinz
- Production companies: Lisa Film; Divina Film
- Release date: 7 October 1977
- Running time: 93 minutes
- Country: West Germany
- Language: German

Three Swedes in Upper Bavaria (German: Drei Schwedinnen in Oberbayern) is a 1977 West German sex comedy film directed by Sigi Rothemund and starring Gianni Garko, Alexander Grill and Beate Hasenau. It was shot in Munich and on location in the Austrian Tyrol.

== Synopsis ==
The owner of a struggling Bavarian hotel decides to import three attractive Swedish girls to help out, and they manage to save the business.

== Cast ==
- Gianni Garko as Otto Gruber
- Alexander Grill as Alois
- Beate Hasenau as Olga Gruber
- Inge Fock as Birgit
- Anika Egger as Ulla
- Ann Lündell as Vivi
- Herbert Fux as priest
- Rosl Mayr as Josefa
- Willy Harlander as first Bavarian
- Peter Traxler as husband
- Wolfgang Katzer as Max
- Walter Klinger as Toni
- Herta Worell as wife
- Werner Röglin as veterinarian Schorschi
- Renate Hess as Isolde
- Willy Schultes as second Bavarian
- Claudia Mehringer as Barbara
- Jacques Herlin as Müller-Meyerfall
- Gerd Deutschmann as third Bavarian
- Marie Luise Lusewitz as Hildegard

== Bibliography ==
- Bock, Hans-Michael & Bergfelder, Tim. The Concise CineGraph. Encyclopedia of German Cinema. Berghahn Books, 2009.
