= When the Mad Aunts Arrive =

1970 film

- Directed by: Franz Josef Gottlieb
- Written by: Kurt Nachmann; August Rieger
- Produced by: Ilse Kubaschewski
- Starring: Rudi Carrell; Ilja Richter; Chris Roberts
- Cinematography: Heinz Hölscher
- Edited by: Christine Brandt; Traude Krappl-Maass
- Music by: Gerhard Heinz; Werner Twardy
- Production companies: Divina-Film; Lisa Film
- Distributed by: Constantin Film
- Release date: 6 August 1970
- Running time: 95 minutes
- Country: West Germany
- Language: German

When the Mad Aunts Arrive (German: Wenn die tollen Tanten kommen) is a 1970 West German musical comedy film directed by Franz Josef Gottlieb and starring Rudi Carrell, Ilja Richter, and Chris Roberts. It is one of the films of the era inspired by the cross-dressing plot of Charley's Aunt.

The film was shot on location in Munich and the Wörthersee in Austria. The film's sets were designed by Eberhard Schröder.

== Synopsis ==
Two men end up at a Carinthian hotel resort disguised as females. This leads to confusion in their romantic pursuit of women.

== Cast ==
- Rudi Carrell as Rudi
- Ilja Richter as Paul Förster
- Chris Roberts as André
- Andrea Rau as Bronja
- Christian Anders as Christian
- Katja Weigmann as Eva Winter
- Ingrid Back as Fritzi
- Ulli König as Uschi
- Gaby König as Muschi
- Doris Kirchner as Frau Himmelreich
- Rainer Basedow as Inspektor Grassinger
- Raoul Retzer as Beppo
- Jochen Busse as Ted Cocci
- Alexander Grill as Kellner
- Hubert von Meyerinck as Mr. Storz
- Gunther Philipp as Poldi
- Graham Bonney as himself
- Kurt Stadel as himself

== Bibliography ==
- Bock, Hans-Michael; Bergfelder, Tim, eds. (2009). The Concise Cinegraph: Encyclopaedia of German Cinema. New York: Berghahn Books. ISBN 978-1-57181-655-9.
