= When You're With Me =

1970 film

When You're with Me
- Directed by: Franz Josef Gottlieb
- Written by: Kurt Nachmann; Rolf Olsen
- Produced by: Karl Spiehs
- Starring: Roy Black; Lex Barker; Zienia Merton
- Cinematography: Klaus Werner
- Edited by: Traude Krappl-Maass
- Music by: Werner Twardy
- Production companies: Divina-Film; Lisa Film
- Distributed by: Gloria Film
- Release date: 14 August 1970
- Running time: 101 minutes
- Country: West Germany
- Language: German

When You're with Me (German: Wenn du bei mir bist) is a 1970 West German film romance directed by Franz Josef Gottlieb and starring Roy Black, Lex Barker, and Zienia Merton.

Filming took place in international settings including several airports. Location filming was done in West Germany as well as Bangkok and Colombo.

== Cast ==
- Roy Black as Chris Bergen
- Lex Barker as Kapitän Hannes Schneider
- Zienia Merton as Princess Tamani
- Eddi Arent as Tobby Kirsch
- Angelica Ott as Angelika John
- Peter Carsten as Joe Falk
- Diana Körner as Susi
- Doris Kirchner as Ajutia
- Corinna Genest as Molly
- Rainer Basedow as Paul
- Hansi Linder as Tamani's friend
- Alexander Grill as Lucky
- Elfie Pertramer as Mrs. Sedlmayr
- Ilse Peternell
- Katja Weigmann as Stewardess
- Margot Mahler as Tobby's Fiancee
- Harry Raymon as Handelsattache
- Elisabeth Karg as Frau Kessler

== Bibliography ==
- Bock, Hans-Michael; Bergfelder, Tim, eds. (2009). The Concise Cinegraph: Encyclopaedia of German Cinema. New York: Berghahn Books. ISBN 978-1-57181-655-9.
