= Three Bavarians in Bangkok =

- Directed by: Sigi Rothemund
- Written by: Erich Tomek
- Produced by: Erich Tomek; Otto Retzer; Karl Spiehs
- Starring: Franz Muxeneder; Willy Harlander; Marie Ekorre
- Cinematography: Franz Xaver Lederle
- Edited by: Eva Zeyn
- Music by: Gerhard Heinz
- Production company: Lisa Film
- Distributed by: Constantin Film
- Release date: 17 February 1976
- Running time: 85 minutes
- Country: West Germany
- Language: German

Three Bavarians in Bangkok (German: Drei Bayern in Bangkok) is a 1976 West German comedy film directed by Sigi Rothemund and starring Franz Muxeneder, Willy Harlander and Marie Ekorre. It was part of the tradition of Bavarian sex comedies, which increasingly utilised more exotic settings.

== Synopsis ==
Three Bavarians travel to Bangkok, allegedly planning to start exporting German beer there. In fact, two of them, the village mayor and a friend of him, the village brewer, only have holiday plans in Thailand, and want to get involved with attractive Thai girls. And all that at tax payer's expense! The village priest sees through their plans and accompanies them. When it comes clear that the priest has a look-alike in Bangkok who is a local pickpocket, who is wanted by the mafia, things get troubled.

== Cast ==
- Franz Muxeneder as Pfarrer & Fred Greifmann
- Willy Harlander as Sepp Ploderer
- Marie Ekorre as Vroni
- Gina Janssen as Emma
- Nancy Lee Galloway as Olga
- Jürgen Schilling as Toni Huber
- Gerry Thiele as Florian
- Werner Röglin as Egi Kühl
- Grit Castell as Frau Löffler
- Uschi Stiegelmaier as Zenzi

== Bibliography ==
- Terri Ginsberg & Andrea Mensch. A Companion to German Cinema. John Wiley & Sons, 2012.
