= Gonska =

Gonska is a German surname of Slavic origin. Notable people with the surname include:

- Mascha Gonska (born 1952), German film actress
- Nadine Gonska (born 1990), German sprinter
