= Who Laughs Last, Laughs Best =

1971 film

- DVD cover
- German: Wer zuletzt lacht, lacht am besten
- Directed by: Harald Reinl
- Written by: Klaus E. R. von Schwarze; Kurt Nachmann
- Produced by: Karl Spiehs; Walter Traut
- Starring: Roy Black; Uschi Glas; Theo Lingen
- Cinematography: Heinz Hölscher
- Edited by: Jutta Neumann
- Music by: Werner Twardy
- Production companies: Lisa Film; Divina-Film
- Distributed by: Gloria Film
- Release date: 9 February 1971
- Running time: 85 minutes
- Country: West Germany
- Language: German

Who Laughs Last, Laughs Best (German: Wer zuletzt lacht, lacht am besten) is a 1971 West German musical comedy film directed by Harald Reinl and starring Roy Black, Uschi Glas, and Theo Lingen.

== Cast ==
- Roy Black as Robby Mertens
- Uschi Glas as Sabine Frobenius
- Theo Lingen as Theo Frobenius
- Ilja Richter as Andy
- Siegfried Schürenberg as General Pusch
- Elke Aberle as Tina
- Raoul Retzer as Leopold
- Ulrich Beiger as Richard Mertens
- Elisabeth Felchner as Dunja
- Brigitte Stein as Claudia
- Margot Mahler as Inge Neuhaus
- Ursula Reit as Margot Krüglein
- Hansi Linder as Senta
- Peter Weck as Bernd Ander
- Eddi Arent as Archibald Krüglein
