= The Yellow Snake =

1926 novel

- 1928 edition
- Author: Edgar Wallace
- Language: English
- Genre: Crime
- Publisher: Hodder & Stoughton
- Publication date: 1926
- Publication place: United Kingdom
- Media type: Print

The Yellow Snake is a 1926 thriller novel by the British writer Edgar Wallace.

It provided the basis for the 1963 West German film The Curse of the Yellow Snake directed by Franz Josef Gottlieb and starring Joachim Fuchsberger, Brigitte Grothum. It was made as part of a long-running series of Wallace adaptations during the decade.

== Bibliography ==
- Bergfelder, Tim. International Adventures: German Popular Cinema and European Co-Productions in the 1960s. Berghahn Books, 2005.
- Goble, Alan. The Complete Index to Literary Sources in Film. Walter de Gruyter, 1999.
