= Hot Pavements of Cologne =

1967 film

- Directed by: Ernst Hofbauer
- Written by: Claus Tinney; Ernst Hofbauer; Karl Michael Heinze
- Produced by: Erich Tomek; Karl Spiehs
- Starring: Richard Münch; Walter Kohut; Arthur Brauss
- Cinematography: Hans Jura
- Edited by: Ilse Wilken
- Music by: Claudius Alzner
- Production company: Lisa Film
- Distributed by: Gloria Film
- Release date: 31 August 1967
- Running time: 90 minutes
- Country: West Germany
- Language: German

Hot Pavements of Cologne (German: Heisses Pflaster Köln) is a 1967 West German crime film directed by Ernst Hofbauer and starring Richard Münch, Walter Kohut and Arthur Brauss. The film's sets were designed by the art director Karl Schneider. Location shooting took place around Cologne.

== Cast ==
- Richard Münch as Public Prosecutor Dr. Rolf Stauffer
- Walter Kohut as Poldi
- Arthur Brauss as Paul Keil
- Beate Hasenau as Betty
- Angelica Ott as Mady
- Doris Kunstmann as Susanne
- Klaramaria Skala as Lore Stauffer
- Claus Ringer as Ernst Stauffer
- Klaus Löwitsch as Willy
- Rainer Basedow as Helmut
- Claus Tinney as Freddy
- Monika Zinnenberg as Vera
- Doris Arden as Lissy
- Monika Rasky as Marion
- Lisa Helwig as Tantchen
- Dirk Dautzenberg as Alfons Schulz
- Eric Pohlmann as Benno Trooger
- Christine Schuberth as Prostituierte
- Jos Hartmann as Gustav Keil
- Jacques Bézard as Emil
- Herbert Fux as Stefan
- Günther Ungeheuer as Landgerichtsrat
- Petra Schürmann as Fernsehansagerin

== Bibliography ==
- Peter Cowie & Derek Elley. World Filmography: 1967. Fairleigh Dickinson University Press, 1977.
