= Ilja Richter =

German actor and television presenter (born 1952)

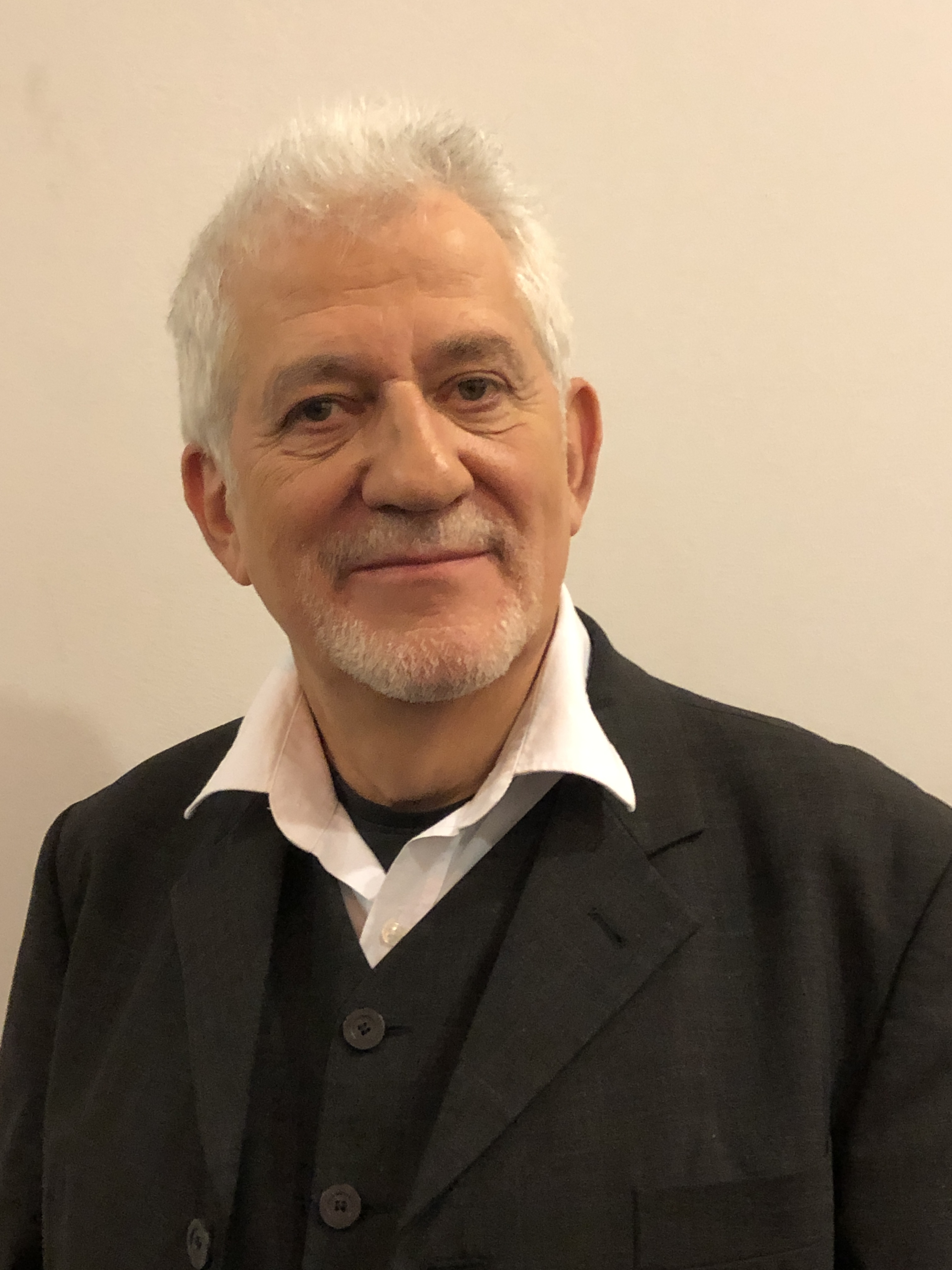
Richter in 2019

Ilja Richter (born 24 November 1952) is a German actor, voice actor, television presenter, singer, theatre director and author, best known as the presenter of the ZDF show Disco.

== Life ==
Richter was born in East Berlin to Georg and Eva Richter. Georg was a Communist, who named Ilja after the Russian journalist Ilya Ehrenburg, and Eva was a Jew who survived the Third Reich under a fake Aryan identity. Georg spent nine and a half years in concentration camps during the Third Reich.

After the family was in political difficulties in East Germany, they moved to West Berlin in 1953. There, the Richters leased a restaurant. In 1955, Ilja's sister Janina was born, and in 1959 they moved to Cologne. There, too, the Richters ran a restaurant, but moved back in 1960 to West Berlin, where they opened a guesthouse.

Eva, a former actress, brought Ilja to the Sender Freies Berlin (Radio Free Berlin) for an audition. Ilja's acting career began at the age of nine. As a teenager he starred in the series Till, the Boy Next Door as Albert. In the 1970s, Richter became famous in West-Germany as television presenter of Disco, a music show filmed before a young live audience in which he also performed in sketches.

As an actor, he played several roles in films and in theatre. He starred in several comedy movies alongside Rudi Carrell. As a voice actor, his most prominent role was lending his colourful, peppy voice to Timon from The Lion King. He also provided the German voices of Mike Wazowski in Monsters, Inc., Spot/Scott in Teacher's Pet (TV series), the title character of Count Duckula and Dave in The Penguins of Madagascar. One of his records is a German adaptation of Tiny Tim's Tiptoe Through the Tulips.

Richter wrote several books. He dated the singer Marianne Rosenberg from 1975 to 1978. From 1995 to 1997 he was married to singer Stephanie von Falkenhausen. He lives in Berlin with his longtime companion Barbara Ferun, and has one child, Kolja.

== Filmography ==
=== Film ===
- 1962: So toll wie anno dazumal
- 1963: Piccadilly Zero Hour 12
- 1969: I'm an Elephant, Madame
- 1970: When the Mad Aunts Arrive
- 1970: Who Laughs Last, Laughs Best
- 1970: Unsere Pauker gehen in die Luft
- 1970: Musik, Musik – da wackelt die Penne
- 1971: Das haut den stärksten Zwilling um
- 1971: Hilfe, die Verwandten kommen
- 1971: The Mad Aunts Strike Out
- 1971: Die Kompanie der Knallköppe
- 1971: Wenn mein Schätzchen auf die Pauke haut
- 1971: Aunt Trude from Buxtehude
- 1972: Betragen ungenügend!
- 1973: Blue Blooms the Gentian
- 1973: Das Wandern ist Herrn Müllers Lust
- 1983: The Roaring Fifties
- 1996: One More Kiss and He's Dead!
- 1998: Drei Chinesen mit dem Kontrabass
- 2007: My Führer – The Really Truest Truth about Adolf Hitler

=== Television ===
- 1963: Schwarz auf Weiß
- 1965: Die Schneekönigin
- 1967/1968: Till, der Junge von nebenan
- 1969: Tony's Freunde
- 1980: Bühne frei für Kolowitz (based on Enter Laughing)
- 1980: Hollywood, ich komme
- 1985: Ausgeträumt
- 1985: Drei Damen vom Grill
- 1985: Mein Freund Harvey
- 1992: Sylter Geschichten
- 1992: Treff am Alex
- 1997: Wenn der Präsident zweimal klingelt
- 1999: Cologne's Finest 2
- 1999: Im Namen des Gesetzes: "Freitag der 13"
- 1999: Tatort: Blinde Karriere
- 1999: SOKO 5113: "Fauler Zauber"
- 1999: Spuk im Reich der Schatten
- 2000: Tatort: "Mauer des Schweigens"
- 2000: Spuk im Reich der Schatten
- 2002: SOKO Kitzbühel: "Ein tiefer Fall"
- 2002: Herz in Flammen
- 2003: Körner und Köter
- 2003: Schlosshotel Orth
- 2005: Princess Undercover
- 2005: Ein Hund, zwei Koffer und die ganz große Liebe
- 2005: Liebe süß, sauer
- 2005: In aller Freundschaft
- 2006: Ich leih mir eine Familie
- 2006/2007: Pocoyo (voice)
- 2007: Die ProSieben Märchenstunde: "Dornröschen: Ab durch die Hecke"
- 2008: Tierärztin Dr. Mertens
- 2008: 4 Singles
- 2009: Romeo und Jutta
- 2009: Klick ins Herz
- 2010: Forsthaus Falkenau
- 2010: Notruf Hafenkante

== Awards ==
- 1975: Bravo Otto in Gold
- 1977: Goldene Kamera
- 2005: Curt-Goetz-Ring
- 2010: Deutscher Hörbuchpreis

== Songs ==
- 1961 – "Schokolade, Pfefferminz, saure Drops"
- 1961 – "Lausbubentwist"
- 1961 – "Ich möchte am Broadway Blümchen pflücken"
- 1969 – "Tip-Tap in die Tulpen"
- 1970 – "Ich hol' dir gerne vom Himmel die Sterne"
- 1972 – "Eine Goldmedaille für deine Supertaille"
- 1977 – "Tip-Tap in die Tulpen" (new version)
- 1979 – "Liebe im Büro"
- 1984 – "Liebeslied"

== Books ==
- Star-Szene '77. 1000 Top-Stars presented by Ilja Richter, Verlagsgesellschaft für Nachschlagewerke, Taunusstein 1977.
- Eva Richter, Ilja Richter: Der deutsche Jude. In: Bibliothek der deutschen Werte. Droemer Knaur 2766 satire, Munich 1993. ISBN 3-426-02766-6.
- Ilja Richter, Harald Martenstein: Meine Story. dtv 2001, ISBN 3-423-20436-2 (original title: Spot aus! Licht an! – Meine Story. Hoffmann and Campe, Hamburg 1999, ISBN 3-455-11277-3).
- Ilja Richter, Viola Roggenkamp: Meine Mamme with an essay about Jews born in Germany after the Holocaust and their heritage, Fischer 16740. Frankfurt am Main 2005. ISBN 978-3-596-16740-1.
- Ilja Richter, Erich Rauschenbach (illustrator): Bruno – Von Bären und Menschen. Boje, Cologne 2007. ISBN 978-3-414-82047-1.
- Du kannst nicht immer 60 sein. Mit einem Lächeln älter werden. Riva, Munich 2013, ISBN 978-3-86883-294-5.
- Ilja Richter: Nehmen Sie’s persönlich: Porträts von Menschen, die mich prägten. With photos of Joseph Gallus Rittenberg, Elsinor Verlag, Coesfeld 2022, ISBN 978-3-942788-70-0.
