= Karl Dall =

German comedian (1941–2020)

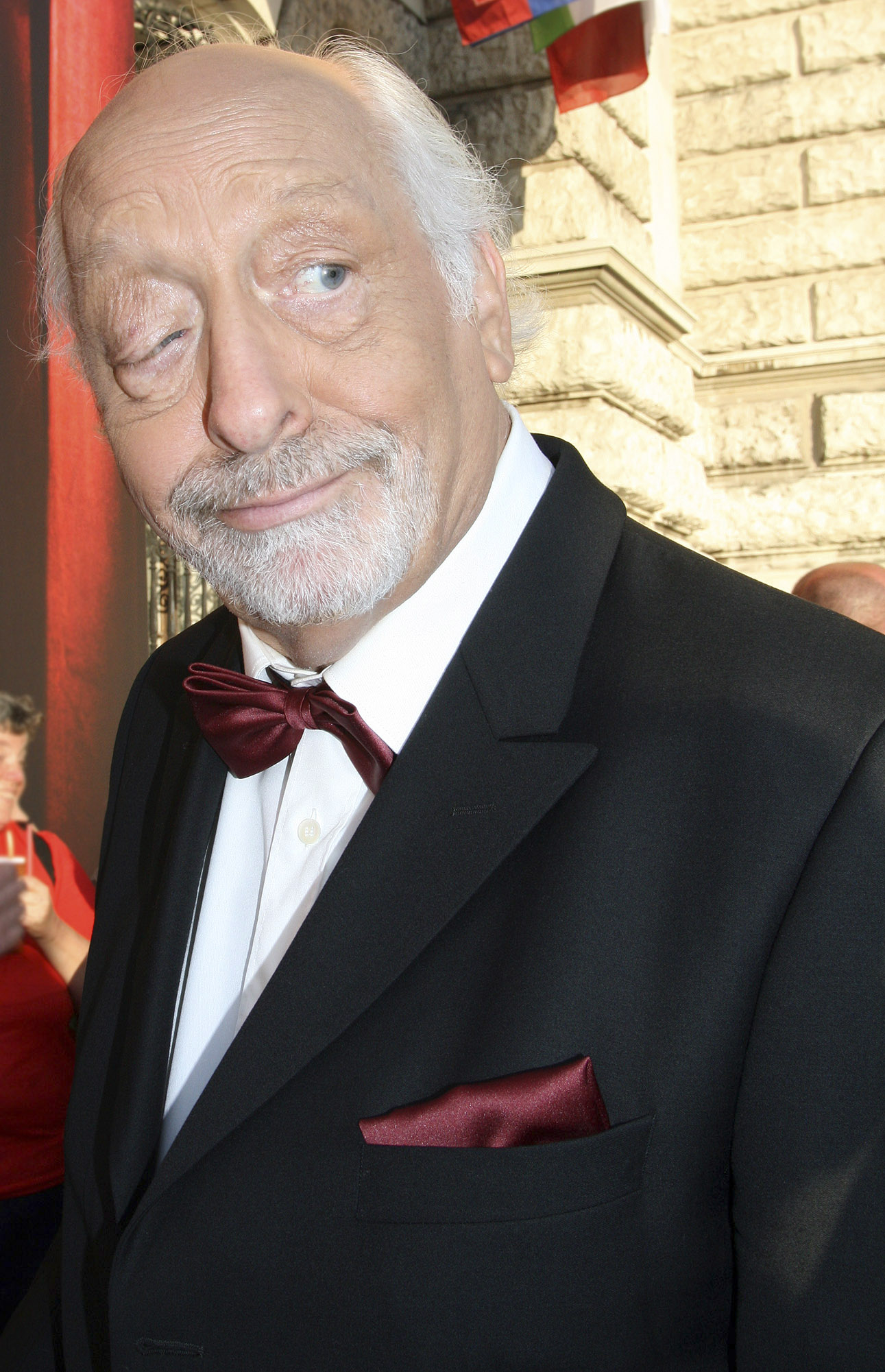
- Dall in 2009
- Born: Karl Bernhard Dall; 1 February 1941; Emden, Lower Saxony, Germany
- Died: 23 November 2020 (aged 79)
- Occupations: Comedian; singer; TV presenter
- Spouse: Barbara (m. 1971)
- Children: 1
- Website: karldall.de

Karl Bernhard Dall (German: [kaʁl ˈdal], 1 February 1941 – 23 November 2020) was a German comedian, singer, and television presenter. His distinctive 'hanging' eye was caused by a congenital ptosis.

== Family ==
Karl Dall was born in Emden, the son of a school rector and a teacher. Karl Dall had two sisters and a brother. He lived in Hamburg-Eppendorf. Dall married his wife Barbara in 1971. They had one daughter, Janina, who works as a stuntwoman in Canada.

== Career ==
Karl Dall left school after the 10th grade and accomplished an apprenticeship as a typesetter in a print shop in the town of Leer, East Frisia.

Together with Ingo Insterburg, Jürgen Barz and Peter Ehlebracht, he founded in 1967 the comedy group Insterburg & Co. of which he was a member until it ceased to exist in the 1970s. Moreover, he created the TV show Musikladen for Radio Bremen and had since then worked for television broadcasters.

From 1983 until 1990, Dall used to appear in the hidden camera comedy show Verstehen Sie Spaß?, playing for example a chaotic film presenter or a telephone prankster.

In the German radio broadcast of Radio Luxemburg (RTL), he presented his own comedy show and was also among the first TV presenters of television channel RTLplus. There, he had his own talkshow named Dall-As which was aired from 19 January 1985 until the end of 1991. The concept was to irritate and provoke the guests. On 4 January 1992, he continued this show at the rivalling television channel Sat.1 as Jux und Dallerei.

From 1991 until 1993, Dall presented the game show Koffer Hoffer on television channel Tele 5. In this show, lost luggage, of which the owner could not be identified anymore, was auctioned to the candidates. Later, he was member of the initial ensemble of the comedy show 7 Tage, 7 Köpfe. The spontaneous Dall left the show after a few years due to differences of opinion with Rudi Carrell who always scheduled his shows meticulously.

In September 2006, Dall's autobiography Auge zu und durch was published.

On 23 October 2020, precisely a month before his untimely death, Dall evaluated his participation as the lead in the upcoming theater-farce WIN=WIN about social distancing during the COVID-19 pandemic. According to its author-producer Roger Steinmann, he seemed fit and eager, "having read the entire play within five hours".

Dall died on 23 November 2020, having suffered a stroke twelve days earlier.

== Filmography ==
- 1963: Apache Gold
- 1964: Freddy in the Wild West
- 1967: Hotel Clausewitz
- 1968: Quartett im Bett
- 1969: Charley's Uncle
- 1970: Student of the Bedroom
- 1970: Hänsel und Gretel verliefen sich im Wald
- 1974: Chapeau Claque
- 1980: Panic Time
- 1983: Gib Gas – Ich will Spass
- 1983: Das verrückte Strandhotel a.k.a. Dirndljagd am Kilimandscharo
- 1983: Sunshine Reggae auf Ibiza
- 1984: Ein irres Feeling
- 1985: Drei und eine halbe Portion
- 1988: Starke Zeiten
- 1989: Die Senkrechtstarter
- 1999: Hans im Glück
- 2001: König der Winde (Short)
- 2003: In Search of an Impotent Man
- 2006: Die ProSieben Märchenstunde: Rotkäppchen – Wege zum Glück (TV film)
- 2008: African Race – Die verrückte Jagd nach dem Marakunda (TV film)

== Awards ==
- 1994: Preis der beleidigten Zuschauer (literally "Award of the offended viewers")
- 1999: Deutscher Comedypreis Ehrenpreis für sein Lebenswerk (honorary award for his lifetime achievements)
