= Starke Zeiten =

1988 film

- Directed by: Klaudi Fröhlich; Rolf Olsen; Otto Retzer; Sigi Rothemund; Helmut Fischer
- Produced by: Karl Spiehs; Luggi Waldleitner
- Starring: Michael Winslow; Rudi Carrell; Karl Dall; Helmut Fischer; Wolfgang Fierek; Ottfried Fischer; Margit Geissler; Julia Kent; Zachi Noy; Dey Young; David Hasselhoff
- Cinematography: Heinz Hölscher; Franz Xaver Lederle
- Edited by: Ute Albrecht
- Release date: 12 May 1988
- Country: West Germany
- Language: German

Starke Zeiten is a 1988 West German comedy film directed by Klaudi Fröhlich, Rolf Olsen, Otto Retzer, Sigi Rothemund and Helmut Fischer. The film was produced by Karl Spiehs and Luggi Waldleitner.

== Cast ==
- Michael Winslow as Mike
- Rudi Carrell as Rudi
- Karl Dall as Scheich Abdallha
- Helmut Fischer as Monaco Franzze
- Wolfgang Fierek as Peter
- Ottfried Fischer as Willi
- Margit Geissler as Lilo
- Julia Kent as Cary Cowfield
- Hans-Joachim Kulenkampff as Hans-Joachim Jennings
- Zachi Noy neighbour of Lilo
- Dey Young as Jessica Norman
- David Hasselhoff as David
- Tatjana Simic as Christa
- Marijke Amado as Frau Drolliger
