= Gib Gas – Ich will Spass =

1983 German film

- Directed by: Wolfgang Büld
- Written by: Wolfgang Büld, Georg Seitz, Peter Zemann
- Produced by: Georg Seitz, Hans Weth
- Starring: Nena; Markus Mörl; Endrick Gerber; Peter Lengauer; Karl Dall; Cornelia Kraus; Horst Pasderski; Helga Tolle; Gernot Duda
- Edited by: Peter Fratzscher
- Music by: Extrabreit, Morgenrot, Markus Mörl, Nena
- Release date: 3 February 1983
- Running time: 91 minutes
- Country: West Germany
- Language: German
- Budget: 1.2 million Deutsch mark

Gib Gas – Ich will Spass (German for "Step on the gas – I want fun") is a 1983 film which helped to launch the career of the German pop singer Nena, although it took its title from the lyrics of her co-star Markus Mörl's 1982 hit single Ich will Spass. Following the success of Nena's song "99 Luftballons" (which is not featured in the film), it was dubbed into English and released in the USA under the title Hangin' Out.

== Plot ==
High school student Robby joins his new classmates in a Munich school, where he meets extrovert Tina and falls in love with her. Tina, however, only has eyes for Tino (Endrick Gerber), a carny with a mullet and a car. While Robby tries in vain to conquer Tina's heart, she already has other plans: she wants to drop out of school and run away with Tino. Tino, however, drives off without Tina. In order to catch up with him, Tina, without explaining her motives, charms Robby to "step on the gas" and on Robby's scooter, Tina and Robby give chase. Over the course of their pursuit they come to like each other more and more.

In an old hut they eventually kiss, and Tina realises that she has fallen in love with Robby. At the same time, however, Robby finally becomes aware that they have only been riding around in pursuit of Tino and leaves. Tina finds Robby on the train to Venice, where the finale is set. In Venice Tina doesn't want anything to do with Tino, who falls into the water and Robby goes to his rescue. Neither can swim, however, and so Tino is pulled out by a girl on a passing boat whilst Tina saves Robby.

== Cast ==
- Nena as Tina
- Markus Mörl as Robby
- Enny Gerber as Tino
- Peter Lengauer as Andy
- Karl Dall as Truck Driver
- Wolfgang Büld as Forster
- Extrabreit as Die Phantastischen 5

== Music ==
Gib Gas – Ich will Spass showcases the music of its two main stars, Nena and Markus Mörl, who had an affair during the making of the film.

The film features 6 tracks by Nena's eponymous band, including their first German release and breakthrough hit "Nur geträumt" (1982), its B-side "Ganz oben" and "Leuchtturm" which went on to become a top 10 hit in Germany on two separate occasions (1983 and 2003).

The film also includes Nena and Markus's "exclusive" version of his German top 5 hit "Kleine Taschenlampe brenn'", the female sections of which were sung in the original by Andrea-Maria Schneider. Markus and Nena performed the song live at the 2002 concert marking 20 years since the release of "Nur geträumt"

== Reviews ==
Contemporary reviews of the film were damning.

In Der Tagesspiegel Carla Rhode wrote, "I would also have liked to have had fun but all that stayed with me were Nena and Markus and the director Wolfgang Büld being completely guilty of a lame entertainment dud. What was it meant to be? A story about runaways, a hit movie or just a few fairly unimaginative scenes to somehow accommodate a handful of numbers by Nena and Markus?"

For the Berliner Morgenpost Peter Müller wrote, "The film material was not new, only the times different, the context changing. And so Wolfgang Büld's Gib Gas – Ich will Spass could have been filmed twenty years ago, perhaps with Peter Alexander and Cornelia Froboess singing 'In love, engaged, married'. This little movie is of unqualified irrelevance."

And no more complimentary was Otto Heuer, in the Rheinische Post, opining, "And now that five and twenty years in the life of pop industry insights have passed, this attempt at a revival of that now blissfully transfigured genre turns out to have been convincingly stillborn."

Nevertheless, the film was a box office success in Germany where 256,000 people saw it during its first four weeks of release. It finished as the 13th most successful film in Germany in 1983 with in excess of 1.5 million people seeing it. However Nena very quickly distanced herself from the movie. In a May 1984 interview with New Musical Express, at the peak of her international fame from the global success of "99 Luftballons", she said, "Don't talk about this fucking film. I hate it – it follows me wherever we go." In another interview at the same time, Nena explained that she, "thought it would be a good thing to make our music a little popular 'cause at the time we weren't successful at all. So I did it, and the result was that we made this movie successful, and not the other way."
