= Lisa Film =

German film company

Lisa Film is a German film production company. Founded in Munich in 1964 by Paul Löwinger, it was named after his wife Elisabeth. In 1967 Karl Spiehs joined the company and took over production, eventually taking sole control. The company concentrated on commercial cinema and produced westerns, comedies and thrillers, often for distribution by major firms Gloria Film and Constantin Film. In the 1970s it was active in the boom in sex comedy films.

In 2017, the life's work of Karl Spiehs and Lisa Film was honored by the Filmarchiv Austria, which, in addition to organizing a one-week retrospective in Vienna's Metro cinema, also published a special volume in the "Film History Austria" series entitled "Wörthersee & Exploitation". Postmodernism changes the view of pop culture phenomena.

== Selected filmography ==
- Blood at Sundown (1966)
- Hot Pavements of Cologne (1967)
- Always Trouble with the Teachers (1968)
- The Young Tigers of Hong Kong (1969)
- Our Doctor is the Best (1969)
- Help, I Love Twins (1969)
- When You're With Me (1970)
- When the Mad Aunts Arrive (1970)
- The Mad Aunts Strike Out (1970)
- Who Laughs Last, Laughs Best (1971)
- Aunt Trude from Buxtehude (1971)
- Rudi, Behave! (1971)
- My Daughter, Your Daughter (1972)
- Cry of the Black Wolves (1972)
- Bloody Friday (1972)
- Trouble with Trixie (1972)
- Blue Blooms the Gentian (1973)
- The Bloody Vultures of Alaska (1973)
- No Sin on the Alpine Pastures (1974)
- Alpine Glow in Dirndlrock (1974)
- Three Bavarians in Bangkok (1976)
- Three Swedes in Upper Bavaria (1977)
- Popcorn and Ice Cream (1978)
- Love Hotel in Tyrol (1978)
- Cola, Candy, Chocolate (1979)
- Contamination (1980)
- Beautiful and Wild on Ibiza (1980)
- Sunshine Reggae in Ibiza (1983)
- Ein Schloß am Wörthersee (1990–1993, TV series)
- Almenrausch und Pulverschnee (1993, TV series)
- Hochwürden erbt das Paradies (1993, TV film)
- Peter und Paul (1994–1998, TV series)

== Bibliography ==
- Terri Ginsberg & Andrea Mensch. A Companion to German Cinema. John Wiley & Sons, 2012.
