= Heinrich Schweiger =

Austrian actor (1931–2009)

- Schweiger as Schubert in the 1953 film Franz Schubert – Ein Leben in zwei Sätzen
- Born: 23 July 1931; Vienna, Austria
- Died: 14 July 2009 (aged 77); Salzburg, Austria
- Occupation: Actor
- Years active: 1949–2009
- Spouse: Ursula Stenzel (1983–2009)

Heinrich Schweiger (23 July 1931 – 14 July 2009) was an Austrian film and stage actor who played leading roles at the Burgtheater on the Ring beginning in 1949. Among the plays in which he starred were Schiller's Don Carlos, Shakespeare's Othello and Richard III and Kurt Weill's The Threepenny Opera.

The actor's last roles were in Wallenstein, Franz Lehár's Das Land des Lächelns and in an ORF TV series.

== Biography ==
After studying at the Max Reinhardt Seminar, Schweiger debuted at the Burgtheater at the age of 18. His breakthrough role came at the age of 22 in Arthur Schnitzler's Komtesse Mizzi.

He had roles in the 1960s at the Freien Volksbühne in Berlin under Erwin Piscator and the city's Theater am Kurfürstendamm under Leonard Steckel. In the 1970s he played at the Thalia Theater in Hamburg under Boy Gobert.

Schweiger also took on the roles of the devil and mammon for 12 years in Jedermann at the Salzburg Festival and had guest roles at the Akademietheater and the Perchtoldsdorf Summer Festival.

The actor also had roles in the TV series Kommisar Rex and Ringstraßenpalais, in the films Franz Schubert – ein Leben in zwei Sätzen and Der Bockerer, and worked with the Austrian filmmaker Franz Antel.

Schweiger successfully portrayed a variety of characters with leading roles in world literature and at the same time been at home in Vienna coffee-house literature.

Schweiger married former MEP and current Vienna first district leader Ursula Stenzel in 1983. It was his third marriage. He died after suffering circulatory failure and a cerebral haemorrhage.

An amateur photographer, Schweiger released the photobook Images of an Actor, which was a collection of photographs started in 1983.

== Awards ==
- Kammerschauspieler
- Kainz Medal
- Austrian Cross of Honour for Science and Art, 1st class
- Gold Medal of Vienna
- Honorary membership of the Burgtheater
- Honorary title of Professor (2003)

== Filmography ==
=== 1950s ===
- A Night in Venice (a.k.a. Komm in die Gondel) (1953) as Enrico
- Franz Schubert (1953) as Franz Schubert
- Das Licht der Liebe (1954) as Paul Zeller
- The Beautiful Adventure (a.k.a. Das schöne Abenteuer) (1959) as César

=== 1960s ===
- Jedermann (1961) as The Devil
- Becket oder Die Ehre Gottes (1962, TV Movie) as The King
- Deutschland – deine Sternchen (a.k.a. Die ihre Haut zu Markte tragen) (1962, Austria) as Klamm
- Elf Jahre und ein Tag (a.k.a. Eleven Years and One Day, International: English title) (1963) as Stumpf
- Professor Bernhardi (1964, TV Movie) as Hofrat Dr. Winkler
- Der rasende Reporter – Egon Erwin Kisch (a.k.a. Der rasende Reporter (West Germany: short title)) (1967, TV Movie) as Egon Erwin Kisch
- Postlagernd Opernball – Die Affäre Redl (1967, TV Movie) as Egon Erwin Kisch
- The Shooting Party (1968, TV Movie) as Count Alexei
- Frau Wirtin hat auch einen Grafen (a.k.a. Sexy Susan Sins Again (UK: dubbed version) (US) a.k.a. A fogadósnénak is van egy (Hungary) a.k.a. Oui à l'amour, non à la guerre (France) a.k.a. Susanna... ed i suoi dolci vizi alla corte del re (Italy)) (1968) as Napoleon
- Frau Wirtin hat auch eine Nichte (a.k.a. House of Pleasure (UK) (US: video title) a.k.a. Il trionfo della casta Susanna (Italy)) (1969) as Napoleon Bonaparte

=== 1970s ===
- Das Bastardzeichen (a.k.a. Bend Sinister (International: English title)) (1970, TV Movie) as Paduk
- Jedermann (1970, TV Movie) as Mammon
- Ein gebildeter Hausknecht (1970, TV Movie) as Knitsch
- Change (1971, TV Movie) as Antoine
- Trotta (1971) as Vater Kovacs
- Die heilige Johanna (1971, TV Movie) as Archbishop of Rheims
- Die Abenteuer des braven Soldaten Schwejk (1972, TV Series) as Bretschneider
- Sie nannten ihn Krambambuli (a.k.a. Was geschah auf Schloß Wildberg?) (1972) as Revierinspektor Bröschl
- Kinderarzt Dr. Fröhlich (1972) as Professor Rodenburg
- À la guerre comme à la guerre (a.k.a. Le eccitanti guerre di Adeline (Italy) a.k.a. War Is Hell (US) a.k.a. War Is War (International: English title) a.k.a. Wie bitte werde ich ein Held? (West Germany)) (1972) as Pavel
- My Daughter, Your Daughter (1972) as Polizeihauptmann Rausch
- Cry of the Black Wolves (1972) as Sam Jenkins
- Briefe von gestern (1972, TV Movie) as Josef Uhlier
- Blue Blooms the Gentian (1973) as Hans-Karl 'Hazy' Morton
- Crazy – Completely Mad (a.k.a. Rudi, laß das Mausen sein) (1973) as Abdullah
- Dream City (1973) as Mr. Gautsch
- Zwei im siebenten Himmel (a.k.a. Two in Seventh Heaven) (1974) as Oskar Ritz
- Verurteilt 1910 (1974, TV Movie) as Max Winter
- Stayover in Tyrol (1974, TV Movie) as Strupp
- Tatort (1975–1987, TV Series) as Peischl / Enzo Neumeier / Königsmann / Tornay
- Bomber & Paganini (1976) as Mr. Dobermann
- Die Elixiere des Teufels (a.k.a. The Elixirs of the Devil) (1976) as the Pope
- The Man in the Rushes (1978) as Mostbaumer
- Job (1978, TV Mini-Series) as Sameschkin
- Iphigenia auf Tauris (1978, TV Movie)
- Die großen Sebastians (1979, TV Movie) as General Zadok

=== 1980s ===
- Georg Friedrich Händels Auferstehung (1980, TV Movie)
- Ringstraßenpalais (1981–1983, TV Series) as Eduard Baumann
- Jägerschlacht (a.k.a. Der Rächer vom Schallerhof) (1982) as J.B. Mayer
- Ein Kleid von Dior (1982, TV Movie) as Peter Wallace
- Milionite na Privalov (a.k.a. Милионите на Привалов (Bulgaria: Bulgarian title) a.k.a. Privalov's Millions (Europe: English title)) (1983, TV Series)
- The Devil's Lieutenant (1984, TV Movie) as Colonel Imstadt
- Flucht ohne Ende (1985, TV Movie) as Iwan
- Echo Park (1985) as August's father
- Erdsegen (a.k.a. Blessings of the Earth (US)) (1986, TV Movie) as Dr. von Stein
- The Madonna Man (1987) as Arthur / Otto Weigand
- Heiteres Bezirksgericht (1988, TV Series)

=== 1990s ===
- Die Kaffeehaus-Clique (1990, TV Movie)
- Strauss Dynasty (1991, TV Mini-Series)
- The Mixer (1992, TV Series)
- Kommissar Rex (1994–2005, TV Series) as Bruno Walter / Bruno Landovsky
- The Broken Jug (1995, TV Movie)
- Ein Richter zum Küssen (1995, TV Movie)
- Der Bockerer 2 (1996) as Major Franz Nowotny
- The Unfish (1997) as Herr Fink
- Die Schuld der Liebe (1997) as Dr. Bredow
- Schlosshotel Orth (1999, TV Series)

=== 2000s ===
- Der Bockerer III – Die Brücke von Andau (2000) as Oberst Novotny
- Edelweiss (2001, TV Movie) as Erich Dorfmeister
- Ein Hund kam in die Küche (2002, TV Movie) as Vater Blum
- Der Bockerer IV – Prager Frühling (2003) as Novotny
- Der Winzerkönig (2006, TV Series) as Eudard Stickler (final appearance)
