= Christine Schuberth =

Austrian actress (born 1944)

- Born: 11 February 1944 (age 82); Vienna, Nazi Germany
- Occupation: Actress
- Years active: 1965- (film & TV)

Christine Schuberth (born 1944) is an Austrian film and television actress.

== Selected filmography ==
- Hot Pavements of Cologne (1967)
- Take Off Your Clothes, Doll (1968)
- Sin with a Discount (1968)
- Hugo, the Woman Chaser (1969)
- King, Queen, Knave (1972)
- Sunshine Reggae in Ibiza (1983)
- Ein Schloß am Wörthersee (1990–1993, TV series)

== Bibliography ==
- Gerard Garrett. The films of David Niven. LSP Books, 1975.
