= The Bloody Vultures of Alaska =

1973 film

- German film poster
- German: Die blutigen Geier von Alaska
- Directed by: Harald Reinl
- Written by: Kurt Nachmann
- Produced by: Günter Sturm; Karl Spiehs
- Starring: Doug McClure; Harald Leipnitz; Angelica Ott
- Cinematography: Heinz Hölscher
- Edited by: Eva Zeyn
- Music by: Bruno Nicolai
- Production companies: Jadran Film; Lisa Film
- Distributed by: Constantin Film
- Release date: 6 October 1973
- Running time: 95 minutes
- Countries: West Germany; Yugoslavia
- Language: German

The Bloody Vultures of Alaska (German: Die blutigen Geier von Alaska) is a 1973 German Western film directed by Harald Reinl and starring Doug McClure, Harald Leipnitz and Angelica Ott. It was made as a co-production between West Germany and Yugoslavia. The film's sets were designed by the art director Željko Senečić. Location shooting took place around Dachstein in Austria and the Plitvice Lakes and Dubrovnik in Yugoslavia. It is set in Alaska during the Klondike Gold Rush.

== Cast ==
- Doug McClure as Don Rutland
- Harald Leipnitz as Mark Monty
- Angelica Ott as Betty
- Roberto Blanco as Ham-A-Ham
- Kristina Nel as Rose Cotton
- Klaus Löwitsch as Lapporte
- Kurt Bülau as Sanders
- Ivan Štimac as Billy Sanders
- Miha Baloh as Buffins
- Fahro Konjhodžić
- Branko Špoljar as Doc
- Vladimir Krstulović
- Mirko Boman as Shat
- Ilija Ivezić as Frank Fox
- Voyo Goric as Achua-hua
- Heinz Reincke as Capt'n Brandy
