= Rainer Basedow =

German film, television, and voice actor (1938–2022)

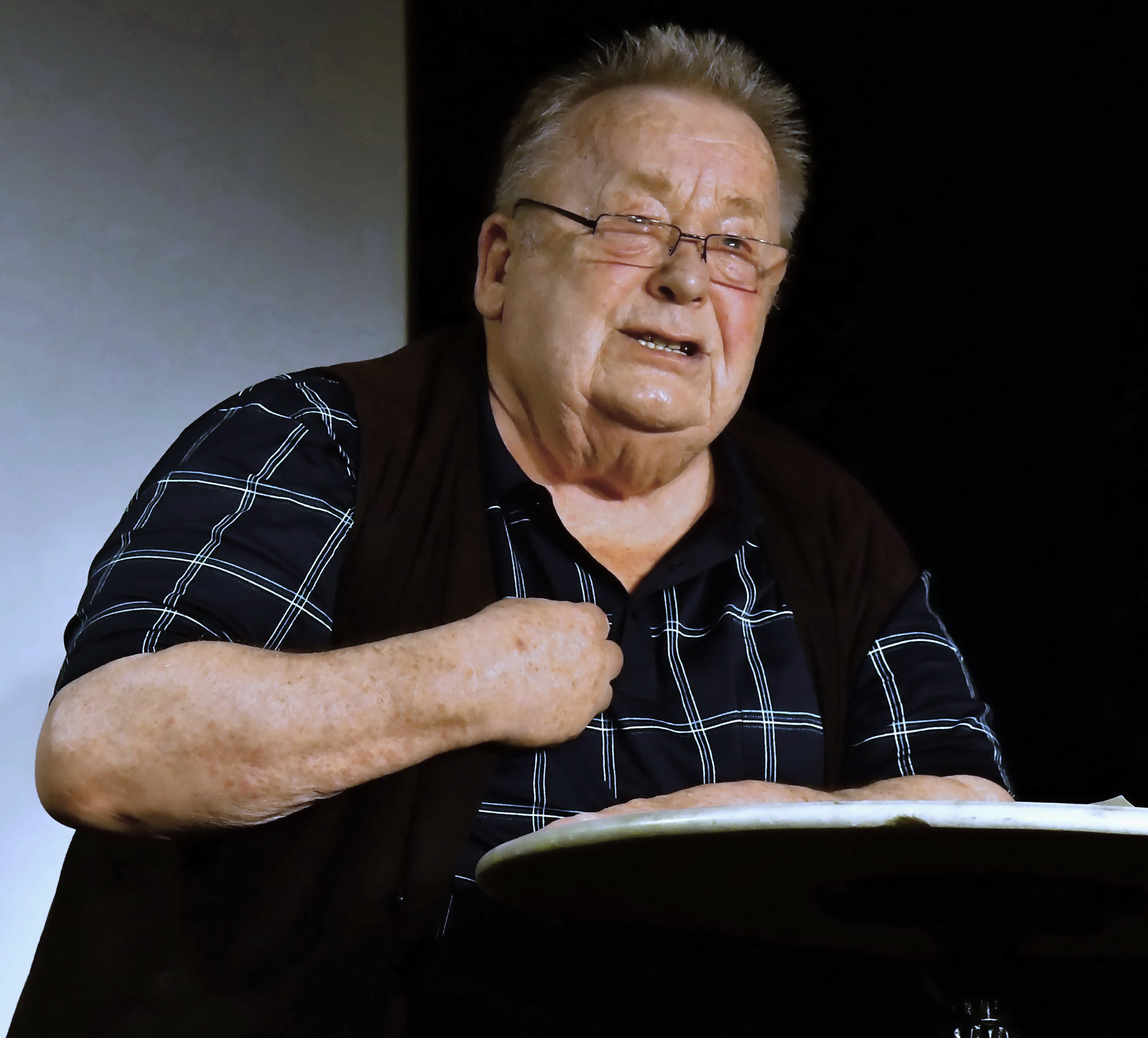
- Born: 20 May 1938; Mühlhausen, Saxony, Prussia, Germany (now Thuringia, Germany)
- Died: 15 May 2022 (aged 83); Salzburg, Salzburg, Austria
- Occupation: Actor
- Spouse: Mathilde Basedow (m. 1971)
- Children: 4

Rainer Basedow (20 May 1938 – 15 May 2022) was a German film, television, and voice actor. He is known for having provided the voice of Pumbaa in the German dub of The Lion King franchise, up until his replacement with Jürgen Kluckert in The Lion Guard. He also dubbed John Belushi as Jake Blues in The Blues Brothers and Ron Donachie as Sergeant Harley in The Jungle Book.

== Biography ==
Born in Mühlhausen, Saxony (now Thuringia), Basedow graduated from high school in Magdeburg in 1956. As he was not allowed to study in East Germany due to "political unreliability", he fled to West Germany in 1956. He studied to be a teacher, German and sports at the Pädagogische Hochschule Braunschweig. He went then for a half year to an acting school in Munich. In 1961, he found his first leading role in the Beckett play Waiting for Godot in a small theatre at the Siegestor. Followed by engagements in Bern, Düsseldorf, at the Schaubühne am Halleschen Ufer, and again in Munich. From 1962, he played at the Münchner Volkstheater.

In 1968, he played a police officer in the cult film Go for It, Baby. Basedow played the Sergeant Dimpfelmoser in the 1974 children's film The Robber Hotzenplotz, based on the fictional character The Robber Hotzenplotz, at the side of Gert Fröbe and Josef Meinrad. Basedow's Dimpfelmoser had a lasting impact on the portrayal of this character, for example on puppet stages. From 1976 to 1995, he was a permanent member of the Münchner Lach- und Schießgesellschaft. Dieter Hildebrandt's television cabaret Scheibenwischer hired him for several editions. Basedow was seen on television in Derrick, Tatort, Der Alte, Der Bulle von Tölz and Küstenwache.

He was married to Mathilde, whom he met on a set, since 1971. The couple had four children.

== Death ==
Basedow died on 15 May 2022 in Salzburg, at the age of 83.

== Selected filmography ==
- Wilder Reiter GmbH (1967)
- Trace of a Girl (1967)
- Hot Pavements of Cologne (1967)
- Jet Generation (1968)
- With Oak Leaves and Fig Leaf (1968)
- Go for It, Baby (1968)
- Death and Diamonds (1968)
- Quartett im Bett (1968)
- Let It All Hang Out (1969)
- Angels of the Street (1969)
- Why Did I Ever Say Yes Twice? (1969)
- Kuckucksei im Gangsternest (1969)
- Love, Vampire Style (1970)
- When the Mad Aunts Arrive (1970)
- When You're With Me (1970)
- Aunt Trude from Buxtehude (1971)
- The Eddie Chapman Story (1971, TV film)
- Tiger Gang (1971)
- Ore di terrore / Kreuzfahrt des Grauens (1971)
- Four Times That Night (1971)
- My Daughter, Your Daughter (1972)
- The Deadly Avenger of Soho (1972)
- The Stuff That Dreams Are Made Of (1972)
- Three Men in the Snow (1974)
- The Robber Hotzenplotz (1974)
- Lina Braake (1975)
- The Clown (1976)
- Potato Fritz (1976)
- Caipiranha (1998)

== General and cited references ==
- Goble, Alan (1999). The Complete Index to Literary Sources in Film. London: Walter de Gruyter. ISBN 978-3-11-095194-3. OCLC 868959494.
