= Harald Reinl =

Austrian film director (1908–1986)

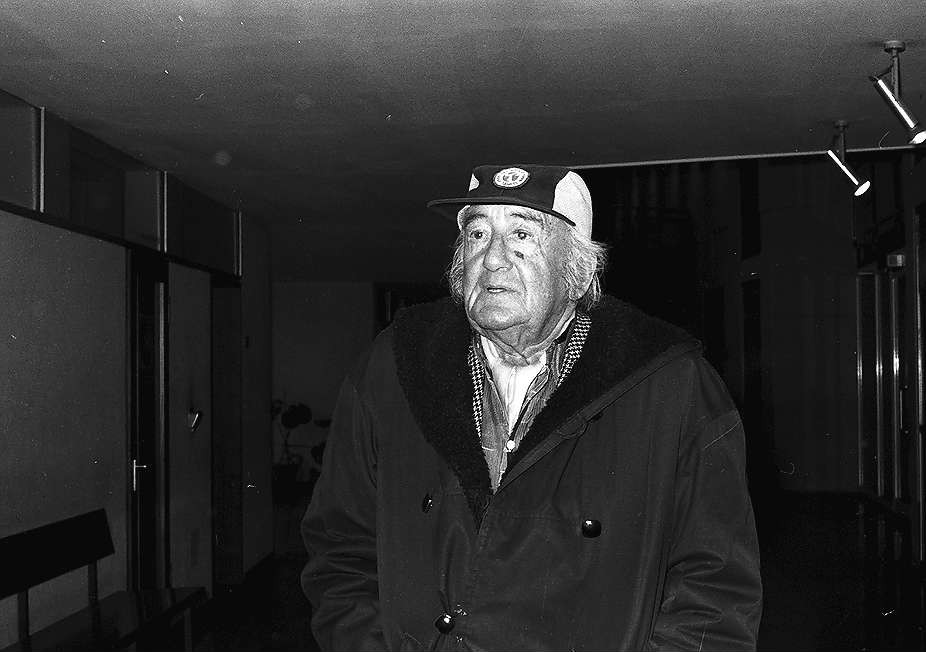
- Reinl in 1985
- Born: 8 July 1908; Bad Ischl, Salzburg, Austria-Hungary
- Died: 9 October 1986 (aged 78); Puerto de la Cruz, Spain
- Cause of death: Stabbing
- Years active: 1937 – 1986
- Spouse(s): Corinna Frank (1946-50; divorced); Karin Dor (1954-68; divorced) (1 child); Daniela Delis (1976-1986; his death)
- Children: 1

Harald Reinl (8 July 1908 – 9 October 1986) was an Austrian film director. He is known for the films he made based on Edgar Wallace and Karl May books (see Karl May movies and Edgar Wallace movies) and also made mountain films, Heimatfilms, German war films and entries in such popular German film series as Dr. Mabuse, Jerry Cotton and Kommissar X. His directing output includes more than 60 titles. With his Edgar Wallace and Karl May adaptations, Reinl advanced to become one of the most successful directors in German cinema in the 1960s: with the four Karl May films he made between 1962 and 1965 alone, Reinl reached 32 million viewers.

== Career ==
A talented filmmaker in terms of his craft and an almost infallible sense of the audience's taste, which he always catered to, Reinl became one of the most successful directors of post-war West German cinema. Even though his orientation was always a commercial one and he rarely created anything artistically significant, his films left their mark on the most diverse genres of the German-language cinematic landscape.

Reinl began his career as an extra in the mountain films of Arnold Fanck. He worked as screenwriter on the film Tiefland directed by and starring Leni Riefenstahl. Reinl's first movie as director was the mountain film Mountain Crystal (1949). He was Oscar nominated for his documentary feature Chariots of the Gods (1970).

By the 1970s, he had semi-retired to the Canary Islands. In 1986, in his Tenerife retirement home, he was stabbed to death by Daniela Maria Delis, his alcoholic wife and a former actress from Czechoslovakia.

== Filmography ==
=== Director ===
- Wilde Wasser (1937, short)
- Osterskitour in Tirol (1939)
- Mountain Crystal (1949)
- Gesetz ohne Gnade (1950)
- Night on Mont Blanc (1951)
- The Crucifix Carver of Ammergau (1952)
- Behind Monastery Walls (1952)
- The Monastery's Hunter (1953)
- Rose-Girl Resli (1954)
- The Silent Angel (1954)
- As Long as You Live (1955)
- The Twins from Zillertal (1957)
- Almenrausch and Edelweiss (1957)
- The Green Devils of Monte Cassino (1958)
- U 47 – Kapitänleutnant Prien (1958)
- Romarei, das Mädchen mit den grünen Augen (1958)
- Der Frosch mit der Maske (1959)
- Paradise for Sailors (1959)
- We Will Never Part (1960)
- The Terrible People (1960)
- The Forger of London (1961)
- The Return of Dr. Mabuse (1961)
- The Invisible Dr. Mabuse (1962)
- The Carpet of Horror (1962)
- Treasure of Silver Lake (1962)
- The White Spider (1963)
- The Strangler of Blackmoor Castle (1963)
- Room 13 (1964)
- Apache Gold (1963)
- Last of the Renegades (1964)
- The Last Tomahawk (1965)
- The Desperado Trail (1965)
- The Sinister Monk (1965)
- Die Nibelungen, Teil 1 - Siegfried (1966)
- Die Nibelungen, Teil 2 - Kriemhilds Rache (1967)
- The Blood Demon (1967)
- The Valley of Death (1968)
- Death and Diamonds (1968)
- Death in the Red Jaguar (1968)
- Pepe, der Paukerschreck (1969)
- Dr. Fabian: Laughing Is the Best Medicine (1969)
- Dead Body on Broadway (1969)
- We'll Take Care of the Teachers (1970)
- Chariots of the Gods (1970)
- Tiger Gang (1971)
- Who Laughs Last, Laughs Best (1971)
- Holidays in Tyrol (1971)
- Sie liebten sich einen Sommer (1972)
- Cry of the Black Wolves (1972)
- The Heath is Green (1972)
- The Bloody Vultures of Alaska (1973)
- Hubertus Castle (1973)
- No Gold for a Dead Diver (1974)
- The Hunter of Fall (1974)
- Crazy Jungle Adventure (1982)
