= Hotel by the Hour =

1970 film

- Directed by: Rolf Olsen
- Written by: Rolf Olsen
- Produced by: Heinz Willeg
- Starring: Curd Jürgens; Andrea Rau
- Cinematography: Heinz Hölscher
- Edited by: Renate Wille
- Music by: Erwin Halletz
- Production companies: Parnass Film; Terra Film
- Distributed by: Constantin Film
- Release date: 9 April 1970
- Running time: 95 minutes
- Country: West Germany
- Language: German

Hotel by the Hour (German title: Das Stundenhotel von St. Pauli) is a 1970 West German crime film directed by Rolf Olsen and starring Curd Jürgens, Andrea Rau, and Corny Collins. It is set in the red-light district of St. Pauli in Hamburg. A Stundenhotel is a hotel where rooms are let by the hour, similar to Japanese love hotels.

The film's sets were designed by the art director Ernst H. Albrecht.

== Cast ==
- Curd Jürgens as Kommissar Canisius
- Andrea Rau as Hannelore Zibulka
- Corny Collins as Nora Benoni
- Rudolf Schündler as Oskar Jennewein
- Michael Maien as Karl Swarowski
- Brigitte Mira as Rose Schuh
- Monika Hielscher as Anna
- Heinrich Gies as Paul Rehschopf
- Robert Wolfgang Schnell as Walter Stooth
- Laurence Bien as Jürgen Möbisch
- Konrad Georg as Police Commissioner Dr. Marschall
- Paul Albert Krumm as Sigi Krulich
- Walter Buschhoff as Lucas Freund
- Gine Magnol as Inge Bauer
- Marlies Petersen as Erna Machunze
- Friedrich Siemers as Herbert Dreegen
- Ilse Peternell as Beate Dreegen
- Thomas Fischer as K. H. Killian
- Angelica Ott as Marion
- Gerd Frickhöffer as Adolf von Batelnigg
- Yvonne Ten Hoff as Heidi Strauss
- Klaus-Hagen Latwesen as Rolf Hogerth
- Manfred Tümmler as Peter Canisius
- Manfred Spies as Kretschmann
- Dieter Wagner as Egon Gold
- Käte Jaenicke
- Ulli Kinalzik as Franz
- Gustl Meyer-Fuerst as Bill

== Bibliography ==
- Bock, Hans-Michael; Bergfelder, Tim, eds. (2009). The Concise Cinegraph: Encyclopaedia of German Cinema. New York: Berghahn Books. ISBN 978-1-57181-655-9.
