= Erich Tomek =

Austrian screenwriter (1930–2025)

- Born: 1 June 1930; Vienna, Austria
- Died: 18 April 2025 (aged 94); Vienna, Austria
- Occupations: Production manager, producer, screenwriter
- Years active: 1965–2012

Erich Tomek (1 June 1930 – 18 April 2025) was an Austrian screenwriter, film producer and production manager.

Tomek died on 18 April 2025, at the age of 94.

== Selected filmography ==
- Hot Pavements of Cologne (1967)
- Aunt Trude from Buxtehude (1971)
- The Mad Aunts Strike Out (1971)
- Rudi, Behave! (1971)
- The Reverend Turns a Blind Eye (1971)
- My Daughter, Your Daughter (1972)
- Crazy – Completely Mad (1973)
- Blue Blooms the Gentian (1973)
- Alpine Glow in Dirndlrock (1974)
- Three Bavarians in Bangkok (1976)
- Three Swedes in Upper Bavaria (1977)
- Popcorn and Ice Cream (1979)
- Cola, Candy, Chocolate (1979)
- Bloody Moon (1981)
- Die Supernasen (1983)
- Sunshine Reggae in Ibiza (1983)
- Hochwürden erbt das Paradies (1993, TV film)
- Die Rosenkönigin (2007, TV film)

== Bibliography ==
- Roman Schliesser & Leo Moser. Die Supernase: Karl Spiehs und seine Filme. Ueberreuter, 2006.
