= The Curse of the Yellow Snake =

1963 film

- Directed by: Franz Josef Gottlieb
- Written by: Janne Furch; Franz Josef Gottlieb
- Based on: The Yellow Snake by Edgar Wallace
- Produced by: Artur Brauner; Wolf Brauner
- Starring: Joachim Fuchsberger; Brigitte Grothum; Pinkas Braun
- Cinematography: Siegfried Hold
- Edited by: Walter Wischniewsky
- Music by: Raimund Rosenberger
- Production company: CCC Film
- Distributed by: Constantin Film
- Release date: 22 February 1963
- Running time: 98 minutes
- Country: West Germany
- Language: German

The Curse of the Yellow Snake (German: Der Fluch der gelben Schlange) is a 1963 West German crime thriller film directed by Franz Josef Gottlieb and starring Joachim Fuchsberger, Brigitte Grothum and Pinkas Braun. It is based on the 1926 novel The Yellow Snake by Edgar Wallace. It was made as part of a series of films based on Wallace's work, made either by CCC Film or the rival Rialto.

It was shot at the Spandau Studios in West Berlin and on location in London. The film's sets were designed by the art directors Hans Jürgen Kiebach and Ernst Schomer.

== Cast ==
- Joachim Fuchsberger as Clifford Lynn
- Brigitte Grothum as Joan Bray
- Pinkas Braun as Fing-Su / St. Clay
- Doris Kirchner as Mabel Narth
- Werner Peters as Stephan Narth
- Charles Regnier as Major Spedwell
- Claus Holm as Inspektor Frazer
- Fritz Tillmann as Joe Bray
- Eddi Arent as Samuel Carter
- Zeev Berlinsky as Straßenkehrer

== Bibliography ==
- Bergfelder, Tim. International Adventures: German Popular Cinema and European Co-Productions in the 1960s. Berghahn Books, 2005.
