= Cry of the Black Wolves =

1972 film

- German film poster
- German: Der Schrei der schwarzen Wölfe
- Directed by: Harald Reinl
- Written by: Kurt Nachmann; Rolf Olsen
- Based on: The Son of the Wolf by Jack London
- Produced by: Karl Spiehs
- Starring: Ron Ely; Raimund Harmstorf; Gila von Weitershausen
- Cinematography: Franz Xaver Lederle
- Edited by: Eva Zeyn
- Music by: Gerhard Heinz
- Production company: Lisa Film
- Distributed by: Constantin Film
- Release date: 4 October 1972
- Running time: 89 minutes
- Country: West Germany
- Language: German

The Cry of the Black Wolves (German: Der Schrei der schwarzen Wölfe) is a 1972 West German western adventure film directed by Harald Reinl and starring Ron Ely, Raimund Harmstorf, and Gila von Weitershausen.

The film's sets were designed by the art director Rolf Zehetbauer. Location shooting took place in Austrian Tyrol.

== Cast ==
- Ron Ely as Bill Robinson
- Raimund Harmstorf as Jack Harper
- Gila von Weitershausen as Frona Williams
- Arthur Brauss as Tornado Kid
- Angelica Ott as Betty Tayler
- Jean-Claude Hoffmann as Jimmy
- Hans Terofal as Stumpey
- Catharina Conti as Akaena
- Carl Lange as Nicholas Morse
- Alexander Grill as Forester
- Dan van Husen as Joe
- Heinrich Schweiger as Sam Jenkins
- Kurt Bülau as Ray Murdock
- Tony Berger as Mike Williams
- Günter Clemens as Tom Lafferty
- Karin Lorson as Sara
- Untine Fröhlich as Polly
