= My Daughter, Your Daughter =

1972 film

- Directed by: Werner Jacobs
- Written by: Erich Tomek
- Starring: Chris Roberts; Georg Thomalla; Peter Weck
- Cinematography: Heinz Hölscher
- Edited by: Traude Krappl-Maass
- Music by: Werner Twardy
- Production companies: Divina Film; Lisa Film
- Distributed by: Gloria Film
- Release date: 20 July 1972
- Running time: 86 minutes
- Country: West Germany
- Language: German

My Daughter, Your Daughter (German: Meine Tochter – Deine Tochter) is a 1972 West German comedy film directed by Werner Jacobs and starring Chris Roberts, Georg Thomalla and Peter Weck. Location shooting took place in Carinthia, particularly around the Wörthersee.

== Synopsis ==
A teacher at a German school is persuaded to impersonate the father of the caretaker's daughter visiting from America, leading to a series of complications.

== Cast ==
- Chris Roberts as Rick Roland
- Georg Thomalla as Studienrat Dr. Oskar Sommer
- Peter Weck as Studienrat Staub
- Catharina Conti as Lisbeth Sommer
- Hans Kraus as Edi Rausch
- Ralf Wolter as Bibo
- Silvia Reize as Betty Snell
- Gretl Schörg as Schuldirektorin Regina Körner
- Heinrich Schweiger as Polizeihauptmann Rausch
- Rainer Basedow as Rolf
- Kurt Nachmann as Schulrat Weber
- Erich Kleiber as Bassist
- Gila von Weitershausen as Hella Mattes
- Heinz Reincke as Schuldiener Oskar Sommer

== Bibliography ==
- Bock, Hans-Michael & Bergfelder, Tim. The Concise CineGraph. Encyclopedia of German Cinema. Berghahn Books, 2009.
