= Walter Traut =

Austrian film producer (1907–1979)

- Born: 19 September 1907; Innsbruck, Austria
- Died: 9 September 1979 (aged 71); Munich, Bavaria, West Germany
- Occupations: Producer, Production manager
- Years active: 1930–1972 (film)

Walter Traut (1907–1979) was an Austrian film producer and production manager.

== Selected filmography ==
- The White Hell of Pitz Palu (1950)
- Behind Monastery Walls (1952)
- Ave Maria (1953)
- Where the Ancient Forests Rustle (1956)
- Fruit in the Neighbour's Garden (1956)
- The Doctor of Stalingrad (1958)
- The Domestic Tyrant (1959)
- Faust (1960)
- Aunt Trude from Buxtehude (1971)
- The Mad Aunts Strike Out (1971)
- Holidays in Tyrol (1971)
- Who Laughs Last, Laughs Best (1971)
- Don't Get Angry (1972)

== Bibliography ==
- Giesen, Rolf. Nazi Propaganda Films: A History and Filmography. McFarland, 2003.
