= Crazy – Completely Mad =

1973 film

- Rudi Carrell and Monika Lundi
- Directed by: Franz Josef Gottlieb
- Written by: Harald Vock
- Produced by: Erich Tomek
- Starring: Rudi Carrell; Cornelia Froboess; Monika Lundi
- Cinematography: Heinz Hölscher
- Edited by: Traude Krappl-Maass
- Music by: Gerhard Heinz
- Production company: Lisa Film
- Distributed by: Constantin Film
- Release date: 30 May 1973
- Running time: 95 minutes
- Country: West Germany
- Language: German

Crazy – Completely Mad (German: Crazy – total verrückt) is a 1973 West German comedy film directed by Franz Josef Gottlieb, starring Rudi Carrell, Cornelia Froboess, and Monika Lundi.

== Plot ==
Robert lives comfortably in a big mansion and luxury, all financed by his rich uncle in Brazil whom he made believe he studied medicine and that he is a successful married doctor who runs his own hospital. For 20 years the lie had gone unnoticed by his uncle until he intends to visit his nephew in Germany. In an attempt to ward off his uncle's visit Robert claims to be busy with a famous science professor from the eastern European state of Bosnatia, but to no avail. Uncle Bill now wants to meet the professor too. Robert's friends, solicitor Alex and Elke organise some actors to play Robert's wife and the said professor, respectively. Once the uncle arrives with his beautiful daughter Daila, who was rather unattractive as a child, Robert immediately regrets having claimed he was married. But not only has he a problem, but Oskar the actor a.k.a. the professor, also has a much bigger problem with a sick Arabian sheikh needing medical help. Even worse, the bosnatian secret service believe the professor has fled his country and attempt to bring him back. A chaotic cat-and-mouse chase ensues.

== Cast ==
- Rudi Carrell as Robert Wagner
- Cornelia Froboess as Erna Schuster
- Monika Lundi as Daila
- Horst Janson as Alex Ross
- Angelica Ott as Elke
- Heinz Reincke as Major Karloff
- Heinrich Schweiger as Abdullah
- Alexander Grill as Wasslow
- Hans Kraus as Polizist
- Edd Stavjanik as Botschafter
- Ellen Umlauf as Dame
- Ulrich Beiger as Arzt
- Mogens von Gadow as Scheich
- Jaime de Mora y Aragón as Onkel Bill
- Georg Thomalla as Oskar Müller

== Bibliography ==
- Bock, Hans-Michael; Bergfelder, Tim, eds. (2009). The Concise Cinegraph: Encyclopaedia of German Cinema. New York: Berghahn Books. ISBN 978-1-57181-655-9.
