= Chris Roberts (singer) =

German schlager singer and actor

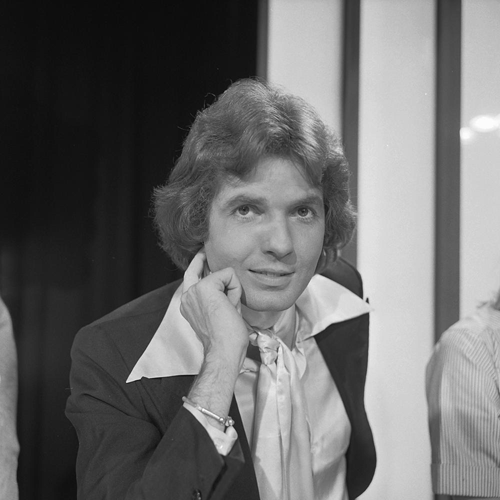
- Roberts in 1976

Background information
- Born: Christian Franz Klusáček; 13 March 1944; Munich, Germany
- Died: 2 July 2017 (aged 73)
- Occupation: Singer

Chris Roberts (born Christian Franz Klusáček; 13 March 1944 – 2 July 2017) was a German schlager singer and actor. He was born in Munich-Schwabing and was married to the singer and actress Claudia Roberts; they often performed on stage together.

== Biography ==
Roberts was most popular as a singer in Germany in the 1970s; he charted there with 24 songs between 1968 and 1980. He also acted in a number of films during that time. He represented Luxembourg as a part of a sextet in the Eurovision Song Contest 1985 in which they sang "Children, Kinder, Enfants". They earned 37 points and attained 13th position. Roberts' first two singles, "Baby's Gone" and "Welchen Weg soll ich gehen", were released under the artist name Chris Robert.

== Death ==
Chris Roberts died after suffering lung cancer on 2 July 2017. He was survived by his wife Claudia Roberts.

== Discography ==
Albums

- 1970: Die Maschen der Mädchen
- 1971: Unsere Pauker geh'n in die Luft (soundtrack; Wencke Myhre & Chris Roberts)
- 1971: Chris Roberts
- 1971: Verliebt in die Liebe
- 1971: Zum Verlieben
- 1972: Hab' Sonne im Herzen
- 1972: Die großen Erfolge
- 1972: Verliebt in die Liebe
- 1972: Die Maschen der Mädchen
- 1972: Love me
- 1973: Wenn jeder Tag ein Sonntag wär' (Chris Roberts & Ireen Sheer)
- 1973: Hab' ich dir heute schon gesagt, daß ich dich liebe
- 1973: Eine Freude vertreibt 100 Sorgen
- 1973: Unser Wunschkonzert mit Chris Roberts
- 1973: Meine Lieblingslieder
- 1973: Chris Roberts
- 1974: Ein paar schöne Stunden
- 1974: Dezember
- 1974: Fröhliche Weihnachtszeit
- 1975: Du kannst nicht immer 17 sein
- 1975: Ich mach ein glückliches Mädchen aus dir
- 1976: Du wirst wieder tanzen geh'n
- 1976: Herzlichst Chris Roberts
- 1976: Kommst Du zu mir heute Abend
- 1977: Treffpunkt Stars
- 1977: Die Goldenen Super 20
- 1977: Die großen Erfolge
- 1977: Wann liegen wir uns wieder in den Armen (Barbara)
- 1978: Star-Discothek
- 1978: Du bist mein Mädchen
- 1978: 10 Jahre Chris Roberts Erfolge
- 1978: CR
- 1980: Chris & Friends
- 1980: Denk daran, ich brauche Dich
- 1980: Das Star Album
- 1981: Ich bin verliebt in die Liebe
- 1982: Ausgewählte Goldstücke: Chris Roberts
- 1984: Hautnah
- 1986: Star Gala
- 1990: Golden Stars
- 1992: Die Maschen der Mädchen
- 1993: Meine grossen Erfolge
- 1994: Hinter den Wolken ist immer Sonnenschein
- 1994: Claudia & Chris Roberts und die Glückskinder: Traumluftballon
- 1995: Star Gala Chris Roberts – Ich bin verliebt in die Liebe
- 1995: Meine schönsten Erfolge
- 1995: Star Gold – Die großen Erfolge
- 1995: Hinter den Wolken ist immer Sonnenschein
- 1996: 30 Jahre Chris Roberts – Diese wunderbaren Jahre
- 1997: Du kannst nicht immer 17 sein
- 1997: Claudia & Chris Roberts: Vergiß die Liebe nicht!
- 1998: Best of Chris Roberts
- 2000: Seine großen Erfolge
- 2000: Schlager Rendezvous
- 2000: Meine größten Erfolge
- 2000: Ich bin verliebt in die Liebe (CD)
- 2000: Dezember (CD)
- 2000: Meine grössten Erfolge (2CD)
- 2002: Momente
- 2002: Du kannst nicht immer 17 sein (CD)
- 2003: Chris Roberts
- 2004: Von allem das Beste
- 2004: Ich bin verliebt in die Liebe (CD)
- 2005: Nur das Allerbeste
- 2006: Du kannst nicht immer siebzehn sein
- 2007: Ein Mädchen nach Mass (Chris & Claudia Roberts)
- 2007: Seine schönsten Lieder (3CD)
- 2008: Schlagerjuwelen – Seine großen Erfolge
- 2009: Star Edition
- 2009: Das Beste aus 40 Jahre Hitparade

== Filmography ==
- 1970: When the Mad Aunts Are Coming
- 1970: Unsere Pauker gehen in die Luft
- 1970: Musik, Musik – da wackelt die Penne
- 1971: ...und sowas nennt sich Show
- 1971: ...und heute heißt es Show
- 1971: Aunt Trude from Buxtehude
- 1971: Rudi, Behave!
- 1971: The Reverend Turns a Blind Eye
- 1972: Don't Get Angry
- 1972: My Daughter, Your Daughter
- 1972: Always Trouble with the Reverend
- 1972: Von uns für Sie (TV series)
- 1973: Wenn jeder Tag ein Sonntag wär
- 1976: Jetzt geht die Party richtig los
- 1977: Plattenküche – Episode #1.7 (TV)
- 1979: Da kommt was auf uns zu
- 1983: Sunshine Reggae in Ibiza

== Awards ==
- 1970: Goldene Europa
- 1971: Goldene Europa
- 1971: Bravo Otto – Gold
- 1972: Bravo Otto – Gold (begin of year)
- 1972: Bravo Otto – Silver (end of year)
- 1975: Goldene Europa
- 1981: Goldene Stimmgabel
- 1984: Goldene Stimmgabel
- 1985: Goldene Stimmgabel
