= Beate Hasenau =

German actress and voice actress

- Born: 15 April 1936; Frankfurt, German Reich
- Died: 1 October 2003 (aged 67); Hamburg, Germany
- Occupation: Actress
- Years active: 1957-2001 (film & TV)

Beate Hasenau (April 15, 1936 – October 1, 2003) was a German film and television actress. She also worked frequently as a voice actress.

== Selected filmography ==
- Jack and Jenny (1963)
- The Sky Is Blue (1964, TV film)
- Hot Pavements of Cologne (1967)
- The Gorilla of Soho (1968)
- Lady & the Tramp (1975)
- Everyone Dies Alone (1976)
- Three Swedes in Upper Bavaria (1977)
- The Little Mermaid (1990)

== Bibliography ==
- Peter Cowie & Derek Elley. World Filmography: 1967. Fairleigh Dickinson University Press, 1977.
