= Doris Kirchner =

Austrian actress

- Born: 3 May 1930; Graz, Austria
- Died: 26 March 2015 (aged 84); Ahrensburg, Germany
- Occupation: Actress
- Years active: 1950–1971 (film and television)

Doris Kirchner (3 May 1930 – 26 March 2015) was an Austrian stage, film and television actress. Kirchner died in Ahrensburg, Germany on 26 March 2015, at the age of 84.

== Selected filmography ==
- Fanfare of Marriage (1953)
- Arlette Conquers Paris (1953)
- I and You (1953)
- The Faithful Hussar (1954)
- The Seven Dresses of Katrin (1954)
- The False Adam (1955)
- My Leopold (1955)
- Yes, Yes, Love in Tyrol (1955)
- My Children and I (1955)
- Stopover in Orly (1955)
- The Hunter from Roteck (1956)
- Where the Lark Sings (1956)
- Scandal in Bad Ischl (1957)
- The Forester's Daughter (1962)
- The Secret of the Black Widow (1963)
- The Curse of the Yellow Snake (1963)
- When You're With Me (1970)
- When the Mad Aunts Arrive (1970)
- Aunt Trude from Buxtehude (1971)
- Rudi, Behave! (1971)

== Bibliography ==
- Popa, Dorin. O.W. Fischer: seine Filme, sein Leben. Wilhelm Heyne, 1989.
