= Gerhard Heinz =

Austrian composer and pianist

- Born: 9 September 1927 (age 98); Vienna, Austria
- Occupations: Composer and pianist
- Years active: 1957-2003 (film & TV)

Gerhard Heinz (born 9 September 1927) is an Austrian composer and pianist. He has worked on more than a hundred film scores during his career, including many sex comedies of the 1970s and various softcore erotic films.

== Selected filmography ==
- No Kissing Under Water (1962)
- Help, I Love Twins (1969)
- When the Mad Aunts Arrive (1970)
- Rudi, Behave! (1971)
- The Reverend Turns a Blind Eye (1971)
- My Father, the Ape and I (1971)
- Aunt Trude from Buxtehude (1971)
- Einer spinnt immer (1971)
- Always Trouble with the Reverend (1972)
- Soft Shoulders, Sharp Curves (1972)
- The Merry Quartet from the Filling Station (1972)
- Trouble with Trixie (1972)
- Cry of the Black Wolves (1972)
- Don't Get Angry (1972)
- Crazy – Completely Mad (1973)
- Blue Blooms the Gentian (1973)
- No Sin on the Alpine Pastures (1974)
- Alpine Glow in Dirndlrock (1974)
- Julia (1974)
- The Maddest Car in the World (1975)
- Everyone Dies Alone (1976)
- Three Bavarians in Bangkok (1976)
- Vanessa (1977)
- The Fruit Is Ripe (1977)
- Three Swedes in Upper Bavaria (1977)
- Popcorn and Ice Cream (1978)
- Love Hotel in Tyrol (1978)
- She's 19 and Ready (1979)
- Cola, Candy, Chocolate (1979)
- Bloody Moon (1981)
- Catherine Chérie (1982)
- Sunshine Reggae in Ibiza (1983)
- Die Supernasen (1983)

== Bibliography ==
- Kristopher Spencer. Film and Television Scores, 1950-1979: A Critical Survey by Genre. McFarland, 2014.
