= Rudi, Behave! =

1971 film

- Gunther Philipp and Rudi Carrell
- Directed by: Franz Josef Gottlieb
- Written by: Erich Tomek
- Starring: Rudi Carrell; Chris Roberts; Heidi Hansen
- Cinematography: Franz Xaver Lederle
- Edited by: Karin Vietinghoff
- Music by: Gerhard Heinz
- Production company: Lisa Film
- Distributed by: Constantin Film
- Release date: 18 November 1971
- Running time: 88 minutes
- Country: West Germany
- Language: German

Rudi, Behave! (German: Rudi, benimm dich!) is a 1971 West German comedy film directed by Franz Josef Gottlieb and starring Rudi Carrell, Chris Roberts and Heidi Hansen.

It was partly shot at Lake Wörthersee in the Austrian state of Carinthia.

== Cast ==
- Rudi Carrell as Rudi Carnel
- Chris Roberts as Chris
- Heidi Hansen as Doris
- Ernst H. Hilbich as Friedrich Schiller
- Angelica Ott as Andrea
- Hans Kraus as Hansi
- Doris Kirchner as Olga
- Hans Terofal as Balduin
- Lotte Ledl as Luise Schiller
- Raoul Retzer as Pförtner
- Pit Krüger as Oskar
- Myriam Dreifuss as Frau mit Baby
- Heinz Eckner as Rezeptionist Schlosshotel
- Gunther Philipp as Sebastian Hill
- Hans Waldherr as Iwan
- Georg Bucher as Gepäckträger vom Schlosshotel
- Anita Hegerland as Anita - Rudis Nichte

== Bibliography ==
- Manfred Hobsch. Liebe, Tanz und 1000 Schlagerfilme. Schwarzkopf & Schwarzkopf, 1998.
