= Heinz Hölscher =

German cinematographer (1925–2021)

- Born: 9 October 1925; Munich, Bavaria, Germany
- Died: 7 May 2021 (aged 95); Munich, Germany
- Occupation: Cinematographer
- Years active: 1949–1998 (film & TV)

Heinz Hölscher (9 October 1925 – 7 May 2021) was a German cinematographer.

== Selected filmography ==
- Two People (1952)
- Sarajevo (1955)
- I Know What I'm Living For (1955)
- Rübezahl (1957)
- The Girl with the Cat's Eyes (1958)
- The Blue Sea and You (1959)
- A Thousand Stars Aglitter (1959)
- Nick Knatterton’s Adventure (1959)
- Brandenburg Division (1960)
- I Learned That in Paris (1960)
- Two Among Millions (1961)
- The Transport (1961)
- The Green Archer (1961)
- Her Most Beautiful Day (1962)
- Only a Woman (1962)
- The Oil Prince (1965)
- Congress of Love (1966)
- Maigret and His Greatest Case (1966)
- Winnetou and the Crossbreed (1966)
- Morning's at Seven (1968)
- Dead Body on Broadway (1969)
- Hotel by the Hour (1970)
- When the Mad Aunts Arrive (1970)
- Student of the Bedroom (1970)
- Who Laughs Last, Laughs Best (1971)
- The Mad Aunts Strike Out (1971)
- The Reverend Turns a Blind Eye (1971)
- Aunt Trude from Buxtehude (1971)
- Don't Get Angry (1972)
- Always Trouble with the Reverend (1972)
- My Daughter, Your Daughter (1972)
- Crazy – Completely Mad (1973)
- Blue Blooms the Gentian (1973)
- The Bloody Vultures of Alaska (1973)
- Alpine Glow in Dirndlrock (1974)
- No Sin on the Alpine Pastures (1974)
- Naked Massacre (1976)
- Everyone Dies Alone (1976)
- The Man in Pyjamas (1981)
- Starke Zeiten (1988)

== Bibliography ==
- Bergfelder, Tim. International Adventures: German Popular Cinema and European Co-Productions in the 1960s. Berghahn Books, 2005.
