= Blue Blooms the Gentian =

1973 film

- German film poster
- German: Blau blüht der Enzian
- Directed by: Franz Antel
- Written by: Kurt Nachmann
- Produced by: Erich Tomek
- Starring: Ilja Richter; Catharina Conti; Hansi Kraus
- Cinematography: Heinz Hölscher
- Edited by: Eva Zeyn
- Music by: Gerhard Heinz
- Production company: Lisa Film
- Distributed by: Constantin Film
- Release date: 13 April 1973
- Running time: 85 minutes
- Country: West Germany
- Language: German

Blue Blooms the Gentian (German: Blau blüht der Enzian) is a 1973 West German musical comedy film directed by Franz Antel and starring Ilja Richter, Catharina Conti and Hansi Kraus.

The film's sets were designed by the art director Robert Fabiankovich. Location shooting took place in the winter sports resort of Kitzbühel.

== Cast ==
- Ilja Richter as Pinky
- Catharina Conti as Lilo
- Hansi Kraus as Stefan Grossmann
- Hans Terofal as Paul Haselmeier
- Jutta Speidel as Kuni
- Alexander Grill as waitress
- Ellen Umlauf as Fräulein Bracke
- Evi Kent as Fräulein Wenzel
- Jacques Herlin as Alfons Ponelli
- Sascha Hehn as Max
- Margot Mahler as Amanda Ponelli
- Heinrich Schweiger as Hans-Karl 'Hazy' Morton
- Eddi Arent as Dr. Überlein
- Heino as himself
- Jürgen Marcus as himself
- Bata Illic as himself
- Chris Andrews as himself
- Nicki Doff as himself
- Grit Castell as Woman at graduation ceremony
- Willy Harlander as Gamsler
- Maja Hoppe as Hotel Management Student
- Otto Retzer as Ronnie
- Annemarie Wiese a Hotel Management Student
