= Sigi Rothemund =

German film director (1944–2024)

- Born: 14 March 1944
- Died: 13 January 2024 (aged 79)
- Occupation: Director
- Years active: 1964–2016

Siegfried Rothemund (14 March 1944 – 13 January 2024) was a German film director. He directed more than ninety films since 1964. He is the father of Marc Rothemund who is also a film director. Rothemund was married to the actress Margit Geissler whom he had a daughter with, Dany Babette Rothemund. Sigi Rothemund died on 13 January 2024, at the age of 79.

== Selected filmography ==
Films and Miniseries

Year	Title	Name	Notes
1974	Alpine Glow in Dirndlrock	Siggi Götz	
1974	Julia	Sigi Rothemund	
1976	Three Bavarians in Bangkok	Siggi Götz	
1977	Three Swedes in Upper Bavaria	Siggi Götz	
1977	The Fruit is Ripe	Siggi Götz	
1979	Cola, Candy, Chocolate	Siggi Götz	
1979	Timm Thaler	Sigi Rothemund	TV miniseries, based on Timm Thaler
1980	Beautiful and Wild on Ibiza	Siggi Götz	
1981	Piratensender Powerplay	Siggi Götz	
1981	Silas	Sigi Rothemund	TV miniseries, based on a novel by Cecil Bødker
1982	Drei gegen Hollywood	Sigi Rothemund	TV film, based on Once in a Lifetime
1982	Danny's Dream	Sigi Rothemund	TV film, based on a novel by Hans Frick
1982	Jack Holborn	Sigi Rothemund	TV miniseries, based on a novel by Leon Garfield
1985	Jenseits der Morgenröte	Sigi Rothemund	TV miniseries
1985	Die Einsteiger	Siggi Götz	
1987	The War of the Oxen	Sigi Rothemund	TV miniseries, based on The War of the Oxen
1988	Starke Zeiten	Siggi Götz	Anthology film
1989	Affäre Nachtfrost	Sigi Rothemund	TV film, based on a novel by Stefan Murr
1990	Das Haus am Watt	Sigi Rothemund	TV film
1990	Der Eindringling	Sigi Rothemund	TV film
1995	Tödliches Erbe	Sigi Rothemund	TV film
1996	Ehebruch – Eine teuflische Falle	Sigi Rothemund	TV film
1996	Nach uns die Sintflut	Sigi Rothemund	TV film
1997	The Deep End	Sigi Rothemund	TV film, based on the novel The Deep End by Joy Fielding
1997	Life Penalty	Sigi Rothemund	TV film, based on the novel Life Penalty by Joy Fielding
1998	Frau zu sein bedarf es wenig	Sigi Rothemund	TV film, based on a novel by Hera Lind
1998	The Final Game	Sigi Rothemund	TV film
1998	Vorübergehend verstorben	Sigi Rothemund	TV film, based on a novel by Norbert Klugmann and Peter Mathews
2000	Der Superbulle und die Halbstarken	Sigi Rothemund	TV film
2002	Maximum Speed	Sigi Rothemund	TV film
2004	Stripped	Sigi Rothemund	TV film, based on the novel The Cave by Anne McLean Matthews
2011	The Gold Quest: A Journey to Panama	Sigi Rothemund	TV film
2012	Grandma Rules	Sigi Rothemund	TV film

Television series (as Sigi Rothemund)

Year	Title	Episodes
1982	Das kann ja heiter werden	3 episodes
1985	Ein Heim für Tiere	4 episodes
1987–1991	Hafendetektiv	6 episodes
1989–1991	Peter Strohm	6 episodes
1992	Der Millionenerbe	2 episodes
1992–1993	Die Männer vom K3	3 episodes
1994	Praxis Bülowbogen	11 episodes
1994–1995	Alles außer Mord	5 episodes
1995	The Old Fox	1 episode: Türkische Spezialitäten
1998–2001	Der Clown	14 episodes
2000	Die Motorrad-Cops – Hart am Limit	3 episodes
2001	Bronski & Bernstein	3 episodes
2002–2019	Donna Leon	24 episodes
2003–2005	Alarm für Cobra 11 – Einsatz für Team 2	4 episodes
2005–2007	Ein Fall für den Fuchs	4 episodes
2006	Commissario Laurenti	2 episodes
2008	Plötzlich Papa – Einspruch abgelehnt!	3 episodes
2009	Kommissar LaBréa	1 episode: Tod an der Bastille
2011–2015	Engel der Gerechtigkeit	4 episodes
2016	Kreuzfahrt ins Glück	1 episode
