= Marie Ekorre =

Swedish actress and model

- Born: 11 December 1952 (age 73); Ludvika, Sweden
- Occupation: Actress
- Years active: 1971-1976 (film)

Marie Ekorre (born 11 December 1952) is a former Swedish film actress and glamour model. During the 1970s, she starred in a number of German and Swedish sex comedies. She was Penthouse magazine's Penthouse Pet (i.e. the centerfold) for its March 1974 issue.

== Selected filmography ==
- Lockfågeln (1971)
- Love Bavarian Style (1973)
- Nøglehullet/The Keyhole (1974)
- Around the World with Fanny Hill (1974)
- Private Pleasures (1976)
- Three Bavarians in Bangkok (1976)

== Bibliography ==
- Tom Milne. The Time Out Film Guide. Longman, 1989.
