= Alpine Glow in Dirndlrock =

1974 film by Sigi Rothemund

- Directed by: Sigi Rothemund
- Written by: Erich Tomek
- Produced by: Karl Spiehs
- Starring: Elisabeth Volkmann; Rinaldo Talamonti; Catharina Conti
- Cinematography: Heinz Hölscher
- Edited by: Eva Zeyn
- Music by: Gerhard Heinz
- Production company: Lisa Film
- Distributed by: Constantin Film
- Release date: 21 March 1974
- Running time: 87 minutes
- Country: West Germany
- Language: German

Alpine Glow in Dirndlrock (German: Alpenglühn im Dirndlrock) is a 1974 West German sex comedy film directed by Sigi Rothemund and starring Elisabeth Volkmann, Rinaldo Talamonti, and Catharina Conti. It is also known as Stop It – I Like It.

== Plot ==
An idyllic village called Vogelbrunn, which lies in the depths of Bavaria, is facing bankruptcy, due to the decline of tourism in the village. To fix the problem, Mayor Sepp Ploderer comes up with the idea to make the village a market town, which means that Vogelbrunn will receive generous government funding. However, not only does the village need seven more citizens to be declared a market town, but the next census is only ten months away. To speed up the process, Mayor Ploderer offers cash rewards for abundant blessings of children, going against the protest of the local priest and Hedda, the chairwoman of the recently founded Society for Morality and Decency, who both consider this idea to be morally reprehensible. Despite their protests, the village board is in agreement with the mayor's plan.

Italian Roberto Ravioli, who is passing through the country, reaches Vogelbrunn and is not only instantly attracted to the village women but he and the village men have sex with all of them. A census enumerator named Spaletti arrives to examine the village. However, his stay is very hectic. He is poorly treated at a hotel, he accidentally crashes through a window of a woman who is in the middle of a mud bath (after seeing a couple have sex) and other many issues.

Later, the prude and strict Hedda is forced to go to the village sauna with the other village girls, who are playfully enjoying their time in a sexual way. One of the village men replaces the sign on the entrance to the alternatingly "women only" and "men only" sauna, leading Roberto and his friend to mistakenly believe it is the men's turn to use the sauna. When both men enter, they are surprised to see the all the completely naked women playing in the pool, but Roberto jumps in to join the fun anyway. Roberto's friend goes into the steam room, which causes Hedda to shriek in horror and escape completely naked. After seeing Roberto playing with the women and seeing more men entering the sauna, a panicked Hedda runs off into a work staff room to find something to cover herself up. Spaletti comes into the room but Hedda, in a panicked state, slaps him and runs away. Spaletti chases after Hedda, who knocks him out with a pan from the kitchen window. As Hedda decides what to do next, she hears voices and hides inside a wicker basket, which is carried out to a funeral home by two workers. When the coast is clear, Hedda climbs up the stairs, only to see another man in the hallway. Hedda pretends to be a statue to avoid embarrassment but she sneezes, scaring off the man. Hedda hides in another room, which turns out to have two coffins. She tries to leave but quickly goes back in because a priest and two other men enter the room. As the men talk about what to do with the coffins, one of the men is asked to open one and is shocked to find the naked Hedda inside. Hedda runs off and is able to find a long black dress and convince the men she is there to view coffins, then manages to escape.

A few months later, due to Roberto and the other men in the village having had sex with all the women in the village, there are six pregnancies, meaning that the village will still fall short of the mandatory population number. With the goal seemingly out of reach, Vogelbrunn receives the saving news that one of the girls, who was impregnated by Roberto, will give birth to twins.

== Cast ==
- Elisabeth Volkmann as Hedda
- Rinaldo Talamonti as Roberto Ravioli
- Catharina Conti as Moni
- Jürgen Feindt as Spaletti
- Ulrike Butz as Rosl Ploderer
- Elisabeth Felchner as Vroni
- Jörg Nagel as Toni
- Erich Padalewski as Count
- Werner Röglin as Wilhelm Röstli
- Puppa Armbruster as Kathi Ploderer
- Gerhard Deutschmann as Florian
- Erika Blumberger as Mathilde Ploderer
- Willy Harlander as Sepp Ploderer
- Hans Terofal as Alter Kogler
- Doris Delaas as Kurgast, Moorbad
- Helmut Gauer as Der Pfarrer
- Eva Gross as Roswitha
- Carlamaria Heim as Emma
- Achim Neumann as Otto
- Gisela Schwartz as Susi
- Gerry Thiele as Oskar Stups
- Erich Tomek as Diener

== Bibliography ==
- Limbacher, James L. (1983). Sexuality in World Cinema. Vol. 2. Metuchen, NJ: Scarecrow Press. ISBN 978-0-8108-1609-1.
