= Alexander Grill =

Austrian actor (1938–2009)

- Born: 30 June 1938; Graz, Nazi Germany
- Died: 22 May 2009 (aged 70); Vienna, Austria
- Occupation: Film actor
- Years active: 1962–1999

Alexander Grill (30 June 1938 – 22 May 2009) was an Austrian film actor.

== Selected filmography ==
- When You're With Me (1970)
- When the Mad Aunts Arrive (1970)
- Aunt Trude from Buxtehude (1971)
- The Reverend Turns a Blind Eye (1971)
- Cry of the Black Wolves (1972)
- Love Bavarian Style (1973)
- Blue Blooms the Gentian (1973)
- Crazy - Completely Mad (1973)
- Spring in Immenhof (1974)
- No Sin on the Alpine Pastures (1974)
- Schwarzwaldfahrt aus Liebeskummer (1974)
- Three Swedes in Upper Bavaria (1977)
- Popcorn and Ice Cream (1978)
- Dracula Blows His Cool (1979)
