= Jochen Busse =

German television actor

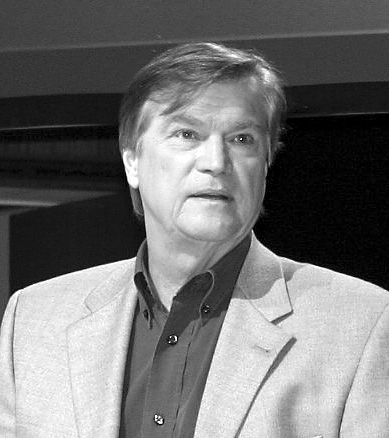
- Born: 28 January 1941 (age 85); Iserlohn, Germany
- Occupation: actor
- Years active: 1960–

Jochen Busse (born 28 January 1941) is a German television actor.

He began work as a stage actor at the Kammerspiele in Munich in 1960 and made his TV debut the same year. He has made 80 appearances in television since 1960. Jochen Busse was a member of the Münchner Lach- und Schießgesellschaft. In 1993 he appeared in the Austrian set comedy series Hochwürden erbt das Paradies. From 1996 until 2005 he was the host of the German Friday night comedy show 7 Tage, 7 Köpfe.

He is separated from his fourth wife.

== Selected filmography ==
- Ellenbogenspiele (1969)
- The Young Tigers of Hong Kong (1969)
- 11 Uhr 20 (1970, TV miniseries)
- Perrak (1970)
- When the Mad Aunts Arrive (1970)
- Angels with Burnt Wings (1970)
- Aunt Trude from Buxtehude (1971)
- Trouble with Trixie (1972)
- The Expulsion from Paradise (1977)
- Kehraus (1983)
- The Wannsee Conference (1984)
