= Trouble with Trixie =

1972 film

- Directed by: Franz Josef Gottlieb
- Written by: Fritz Eckhardt (book); Kurt Nachmann (book)
- Starring: Uschi Glas; Peter Weck; Fritz Eckhardt
- Cinematography: Franz Xaver Lederle
- Edited by: Traude Krappl-Maass
- Music by: Gerhard Heinz
- Production company: Lisa Film
- Distributed by: Terra Film
- Release date: 19 October 1972
- Running time: 89 minutes
- Country: West Germany
- Language: German

Trouble with Trixie (German: Trubel um Trixie) is a 1972 West German comedy film directed by Franz Josef Gottlieb and starring Uschi Glas, Peter Weck, and Fritz Eckhardt.

== Synopsis ==
A young woman is sent by an American company to spy on a German toy manufacturer.

== Cast ==
- Uschi Glas as Trixie Schneider
- Peter Weck as Teddy Wiesinger
- Fritz Eckhardt as Wiesinger sen.
- Hans Terofal as Schiffskapitän
- Karl Tischlinger as Portier
- Claudia Butenuth as Holzapfel
- Konrad Georg as Mr. Brown
- Raoul Retzer as Zugführer
- Gerhart Lippert as Ronald
- Herbert Fux as Polizist
- Kurt Nachmann as Otto
- Franz Stoss as Doctor Weinzierl
- Jean-Claude Hoffmann
- Ernst H. Hilbich as Röslein
- Heidrun Hankammer as Mr. Browns Sekretärin
- Jochen Busse as Schabernag

== Bibliography ==
- Schliesser, Roman; Moser, Leo, eds. (2006). Die Supernase: Karl Spiehs und seine Filme (in German). Vienna: Ueberreuter. ISBN 978-3-8000-7228-6.
