= Mascha Gonska =

German actress

- Born: 19 November 1952 (age 73); La Ferté Bernard, France
- Occupation: Actress
- Years active: 1969-

Mascha Gonska (born 19 November 1952) is a German film actress. She was born in France to Polish parents.

== Selected filmography ==
- Herzblatt oder Wie sag ich’s meiner Tochter? (1969), as "Herzblatt"
- The Sex Nest (1970), as Luise Zibell
- Unsere Pauker gehen in die Luft (1970), as Gaby
- Musik, Musik – da wackelt die Penne (1970), as Inge Kainz
- Twenty Girls and the Teachers (1971), as Trixie
- My Father, the Ape and I (1971), as Biggi Hansen
- Und Jimmy ging zum Regenbogen (1971), as Bianca
- Aunt Trude from Buxtehude (1971), as Karin
- The Mad Aunts Strike Out (1971), as Eva Wiedemann
- Die Kompanie der Knallköppe (1971), as Beatrice
- Hau drauf, Kleiner (1974), as Caroline
- Der kleine Doktor: Die Notbremse (1974, TV series episode), as Jeanette
- The Infernal Trio (1974), as Catherine Schmidt
- Ardéchois cœur fidèle (1974, TV miniseries), as Angéline
- Derrick: Tod am Bahngleis (1975, TV series episode), as Hannelore Greiser
- Parapsycho – Spectrum of Fear (1975), as Mascha
- Derrick: Kamillas junger Freund (1975, TV series episode), as Marlies
- Derrick: Alarm auf Revier 12 (1975, TV series episode), as Lona Ross
- Geburtstage: Bitte laut klopfen (1976, TV series episode), as Hanne
- Lobster: Das Kind (1976, TV series episode)
- Tea for Three (1976)
- Halbe-Halbe (1977), as Eva Hauff
- Derrick: Ein Hinterhalt (1978, TV series episode), as Maria
- Kneuss (1978), as Agnes
- Sechs Millionen: Die neue Armut der Familie S. (1978, TV series episode)
- The Old Fox: Pensionstod (1979, TV series episode), as Nana Dorakis
- Wer anderen eine Grube gräbt (1979, TV anthology film), as Mrs. Mansell
- The American Success Company (1980), as Greta
- Les Chevaux du soleil (1980, TV series), as Angèle

== Bibliography ==
- Goble, Alan. The Complete Index to Literary Sources in Film. Walter de Gruyter, 1999.
