= Sunshine Reggae in Ibiza =

1983 film

- Italian theatrical release poster by Enzo Sciotti
- Directed by: Franz Marischka
- Written by: Erich Tomek
- Produced by: Erich Tomek
- Starring: Karl Dall; Olivia Pascal; Chris Roberts
- Cinematography: Fritz Baader; Siegfried Gundel
- Edited by: Susan Berthel-Ying; Claudia Wutz
- Music by: Gerhard Heinz
- Production company: Lisa Film
- Release date: 11 November 1983
- Running time: 86 minutes
- Country: West Germany
- Language: German

Sunshine Reggae in Ibiza (German: Sunshine Reggae auf Ibiza) is a 1983 West German comedy film directed by Franz Marischka and starring Karl Dall, Olivia Pascal, and Chris Roberts.

== Cast ==
- Karl Dall as Karl / Excellency Gobroukin
- Olivia Pascal as Christa
- Chris Roberts as 'Uncle' Bernie
- Jacqueline Elber as Barbara
- Bea Fiedler as Rita
- John Jürgens as Frankie
- Alexander Gittinger as Slowly
- Gudrun Velisek as Gudrun
- Isa Haller as Linda Lu
- Christine Schuberth as Renate
- Olli Maier as Gottlieb
- Werner Böhm as Harald
- Helga Feddersen as Suleika
- Angelica Böck as Mädchen in Regentonne
- Julia Kent as Mutter mit Baby
- Carmen Lentz as Strandhase
- Marie Luise Lusewitz as Woman leaving train in Oldenburg
- Hans Werner Olm as Postbote
- Otto Retzer as Passagier in Oldenburg

== Bibliography ==
- Schulz, Daniela (2014) [2012]. Wenn die Musik spielt...: Der deutsche Schlagerfilm der 1950er bis 1970er Jahre (in German). Bielefeld: Transcript Verlag. ISBN 978-3-8394-1882-6.
