= Student of the Bedroom =

- Directed by: Michael Verhoeven
- Written by: Finn Søeborg (novel); Volker Vogeler
- Produced by: Rob Houwer
- Starring: Christof Wackernagel; Gila von Weitershausen; Hannelore Elsner
- Cinematography: Heinz Hölscher
- Edited by: Jane Seitz
- Music by: Axel Linstädt
- Production company: Houwer-Film
- Distributed by: Constantin Film
- Release date: 2 January 1970
- Running time: 83 minutes
- Country: West Germany
- Language: German

Student of the Bedroom (German: Der Bettenstudent oder Was mach' ich mit den Mädchen?) is a 1970 West German comedy film directed by Michael Verhoeven and starring Christof Wackernagel, Gila von Weitershausen and Hannelore Elsner.

== Main cast ==
- Christof Wackernagel as Christof Müller
- Gila von Weitershausen as Nicci Krüger
- Hannelore Elsner as Brigitte
- Karl Dall as Sportsfreund
- Henry van Lyck as Justus von Liebig
- Stella Adorf as Fee
- Henri Henrion as Peter
- Melanie Horeschowsky as Frau Mehlwald
- Alfons Teuber as Herr Mehlwald
- Ludwig Schmid-Wildy as Vorgesetzter
- Gustl Bayrhammer as Herr Krüger

== Bibliography ==
- Reimer, Robert C. & Reimer, Carol J. The A to Z of German Cinema. Scarecrow Press, 2010.
