= Popcorn and Ice Cream =

1978 film by Franz Josef Gottlieb

- Directed by: Franz Josef Gottlieb
- Written by: Erich Tomek
- Starring: Benny; Olivia Pascal; Zachi Noy
- Cinematography: Vlada Majic
- Edited by: Gisela Haller; Georgia von Pawelsz
- Music by: Gerhard Heinz
- Production companies: Lisa Film; Barthonia Film
- Distributed by: Residenz Film
- Release date: 6 October 1978
- Running time: 94 minutes
- Country: West Germany
- Language: German

Popcorn and Ice Cream (German: Popcorn und Himbeereis) is a 1978 West German sex comedy film directed by Franz Josef Gottlieb and starring Benny, Olivia Pascal and Zachi Noy.

== Cast ==
- Benny as Bobby Hansen
- Olivia Pascal as Vivi Berger
- Zachi Noy as Jonny
- Gesa Thoma as Bea
- Alexander Grill as Hotelchef Alexander
- Bea Fiedler as Policewoman Sandra
- Karl Heinz Maslo as Bob Fischer
- Margarethe Kuske as Hotelchefin
- Walter Kraus as Otto Bronzky
- Ursula Buchfellner as Yvonne
- Erwin Neuwirth as Falschparker
- Christine Zierl as Pamela
- Rosl Mayr as Old Woman
- Hermann Killmeyer as Koch
- Otto Prem as Grobian
- Herbert Fux as Priest

== Bibliography ==
- Annette Miersch. Schulmädchen-Report: der deutsche Sexfilm der 70er Jahre. Bertz, 2003.
