= Franz Josef Gottlieb =

Austrian film director (1930–2006)

- Born: 1 November 1930; Semmering, Austria
- Died: 23 July 2006 (aged 75); Verden an der Aller, Germany
- Occupations: Film director, screenwriter
- Years active: 1959–2005

Franz Josef Gottlieb (1 November 1930 – 23 July 2006) was an Austrian film director and screenwriter. He directed 60 films between 1959 and 2005. He also directed the children's series Ravioli in 1983; it aired on ZDF in 1984. He was born in Semmering, Austria and died in Verden an der Aller, Germany of a brain tumor, at age 75.

== Selected filmography ==
- Mikosch of the Secret Service (co-director Franz Marischka, 1959)
- My Niece Doesn't Do That (1960)
- Season in Salzburg (1961)
- The Forester's Daughter (1962)
- The Curse of the Yellow Snake (1963)
- The Black Abbot (1963)
- The Secret of the Black Widow (1963)
- The Seventh Victim (1964)
- The Curse of the Hidden Vault (1964)
- The Phantom of Soho (1964)
- Wild Kurdistan (1965)
- Kingdom of the Silver Lion (1965)
- A Holiday with Piroschka (1965)
- Spy Today, Die Tomorrow (1967)
- Klassenkeile (1969)
- When You're With Me (1970)
- When the Mad Aunts Arrive (1970)
- Aunt Trude from Buxtehude (1971)
- Wir hau'n den Hauswirt in die Pfanne (1971)
- Hilfe, die Verwandten kommen (1971)
- The Mad Aunts Strike Out (1971)
- Rudi, Behave! (1971)
- Trouble with Trixie (1972)
- Crazy - Completely Mad (1973)
- No Sin on the Alpine Pastures (1974)
- The Secret Carrier (1975)
- Lady Dracula (1977)
- Popcorn and Ice Cream (1978)
- She's 19 and Ready (1979)
- Mandara (1983, TV miniseries)
- A Slip of the Disc (1987, TV film)
- Death Stone (1987)
- Three Crazy Jerks (1987)
- A Touch of Danger (1988, TV film)
- Kartoffeln mit Stippe (1990, TV miniseries)
- Die Liebe eines Priesters (2005, TV film)
