= Ilse Kubaschewski =

German film producer

- Born: 18 August 1907; Berlin, German Empire
- Died: 30 October 2001 (aged 94); Munich, Germany
- Other name: Ilse Kramp
- Occupation: Producer

Ilse Kubaschewski (1907–2001) was a German film producer. She became one of the prominent figures in the post-war West German film industry after setting up the distribution company Gloria Film in 1949.

== Bibliography ==
- Bergfelder, Tim. International Adventures: German Popular Cinema and European Co-Productions in the 1960s. Berghahn Books, 2005.
