= Gloria Film =

German film company

Gloria Film was a West German film production and distribution company. It was established in 1949 by Ilse Kubaschewski. An earlier, unconnected company of the same name had existed during the silent era in Germany, and had been absorbed into UFA in the 1920s. During the 1930s an Austrian production company also called itself Gloria.

The company was set up by Kubaschewski, a cinema-owner, who had noted that re-releases of Nazi-era films, particularly those made by UFA were easily outgrossing foreign film imports and post-war realist rubble films. Initially her company specialised in acquiring the rights to classic German films, but gradually she began co-funding new films with production companies. In 1953 she set up Divina Film, her own production company.

Her initial films re-used many of the stars of Nazi-era cinema such as Zarah Leander, Marika Rokk and Kristina Söderbaum but newer stars such as Ruth Leuwerik, Maria Schell and Sonja Ziemann also appeared. Many of the company's films were Heimatfilm and melodramas that were aimed at a primarily female audience. Kubaschewski felt she understood the tastes of the average German housewife, and during the 1950s and early 1960s her judgement proved to be astute.

Later Gloria lost its prominence in the mid-1960s as audiences began to change, with the rise of new genres such as the series of Edgar Wallace thrillers and Karl May westerns that attracted a younger, male audience that other companies such as Rialto and Constantin catered for. The company experimented with sex comedies such as Angelique.

== Bibliography ==
- Bergfelder, Tim. International Adventures: German Popular Cinema and European Co-Productions in the 1960s. Berghahn Books, 2005.
