= Rudi Carrell =

Dutch entertainer (1934–2006)

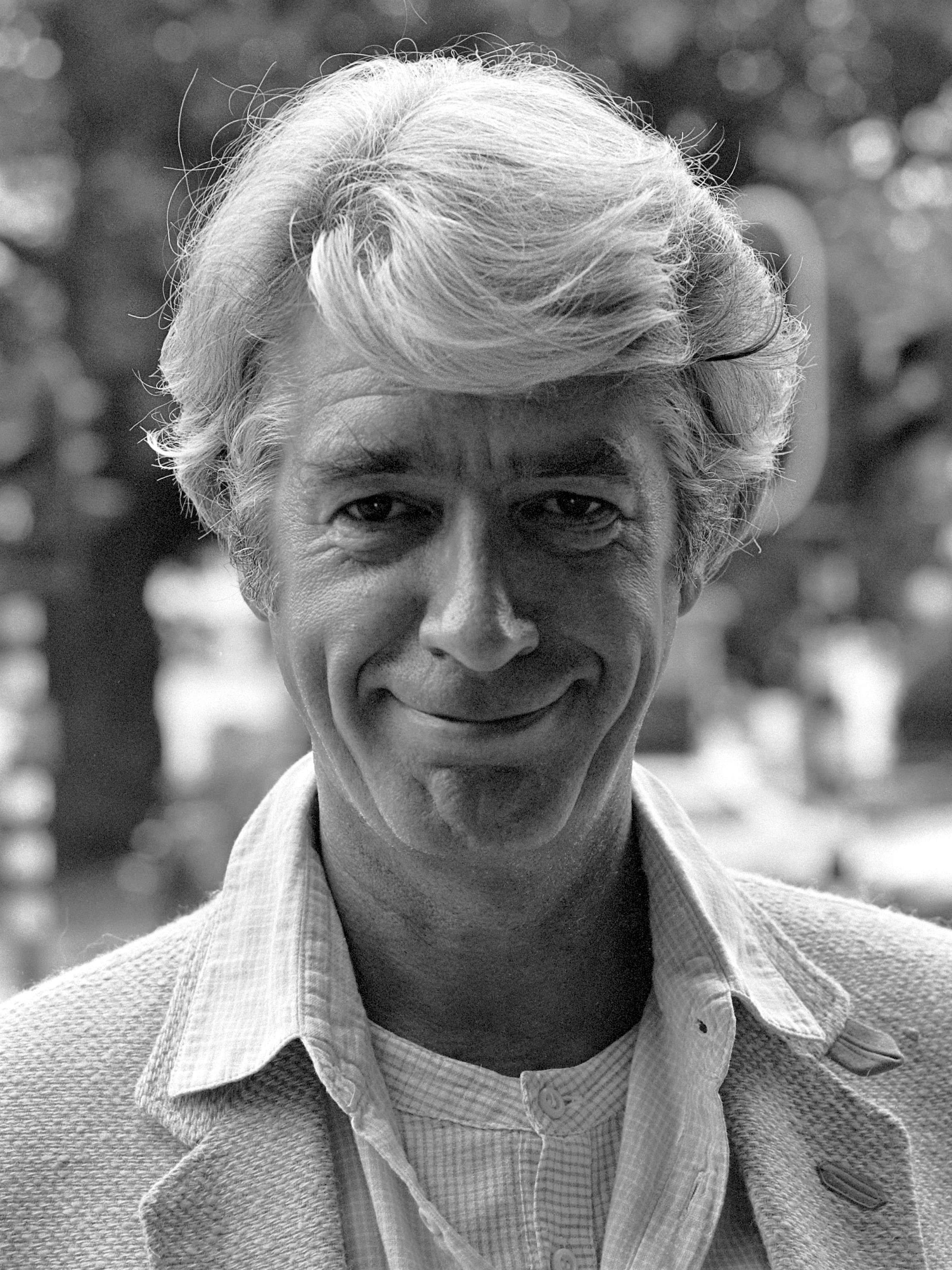
- Carrell in 1980
- Born: Rudolf Wijbrand Kesselaar; 19 December 1934; Alkmaar, Netherlands
- Died: 7 July 2006 (aged 71); Bremen, Germany
- Occupation: Entertainer
- Years active: 1951–2006

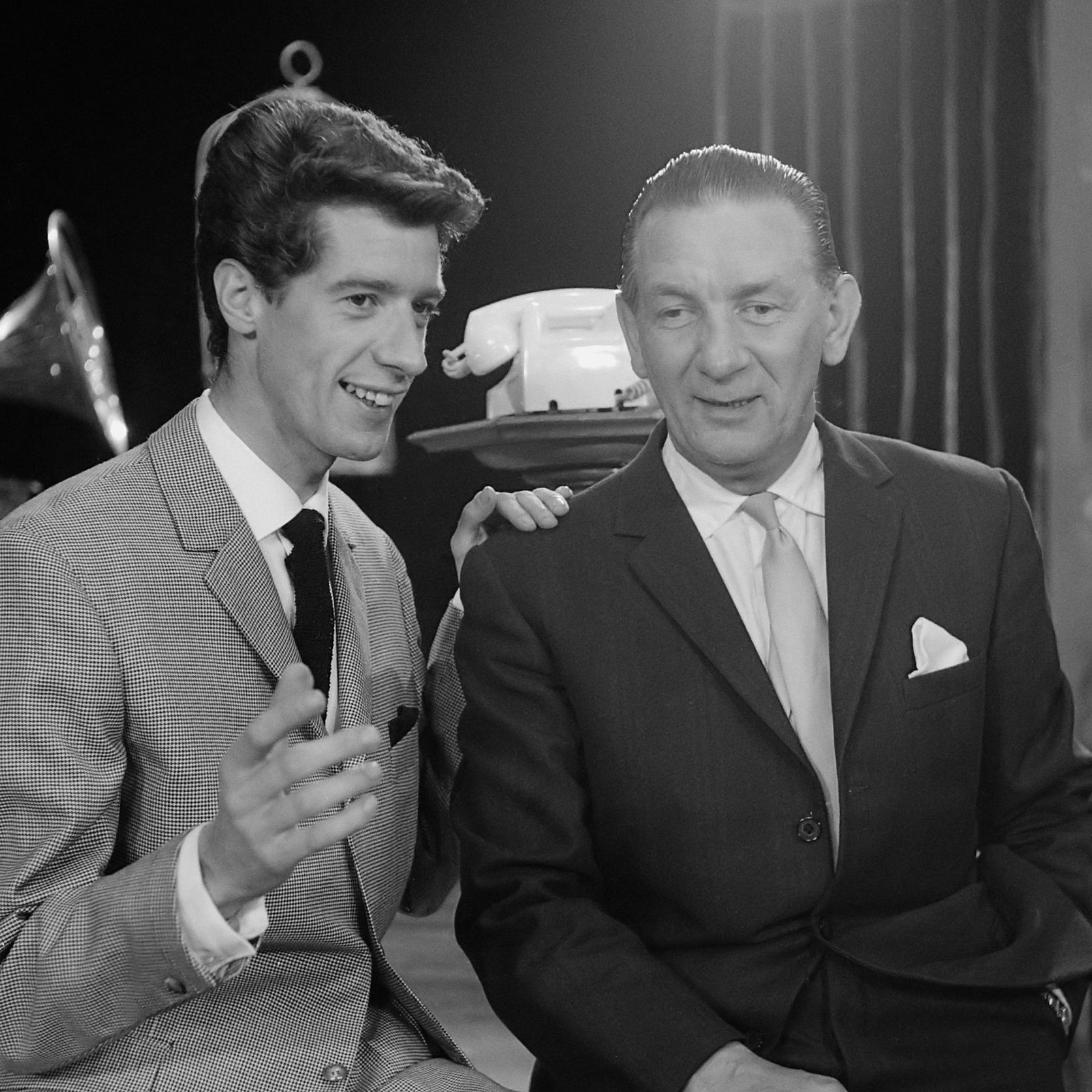
Carrell with his father in 1960

Rudi Carrell (born Rudolf Wijbrand Kesselaar; 19 December 1934 – 7 July 2006) was a Dutch entertainer. Along with famous entertainers such as Johannes Heesters and Linda de Mol, he was one of the most successful Dutch personalities active in Germany.

He worked as a television entertainer and hosted his own show; the Rudi Carrell Show ran first in the Netherlands, and then for many years in Germany. As a singer he had a number of hits, including a Dutch version of "A Windmill in Old Amsterdam", and acted in several movies. He also recorded several songs in German.

== Singing career ==
Carrell performing at the Eurovision Song Contest 1960 final

Carrell represented the Netherlands at the Eurovision Song Contest 1960 with the song "Wat een geluk" ("What luck"). He finished 12th out of 13, scoring just two points.

== Television career ==
=== Rudi Carrell Show ===
Carrell (left; centre) in 1964

The Rudi Carrell Show was commissioned by VARA in 1961 and was a big success for Carrell. He moved the show to Das Erste for a short while in 1965, before taking it back to the Netherlands for one more year in 1967. The show was then recommissioned permanently by Das Erste, lasting until 1973. The Rudi Carrell Show was aired about three times a year with a variety of well-known guests, including Sandie Shaw, Petula Clark, Tony Marshall and Peggy March.

The show included a similar concept to Star Search or Pop Idol and brought many well-known German pop stars and actors to prominence, such as Alexis and Mark Keller. It also featured comedy sketches and international guests.

Carrell was slated to become the new host of ZDF game show Der goldene Schuß, but he declined. Vico Torriani eventually took over the show.

His show was also popular in some non-German-speaking European countries, such as Slovenia and Croatia.

=== Am laufenden Band ===
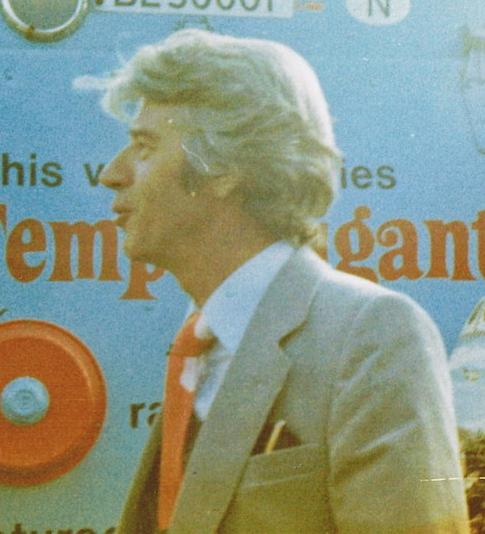
Carrell in 1976

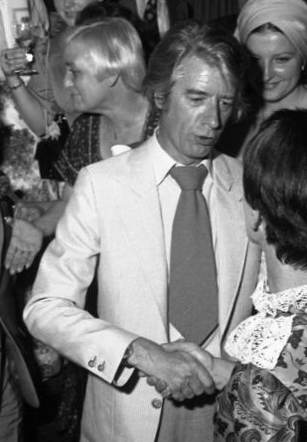
Carrell in 1977

The Rudi Carrell Show ended in 1973 when he premiered Am laufenden Band, loosely based on a Dutch show Eén van de Acht. The show was broadcast monthly and became one of Germany's most-watched game shows of the 1970s, ending in 1979.

The show was exported to the United Kingdom, where it was known as The Generation Game.

=== 1980s ===
Carrell in 1985

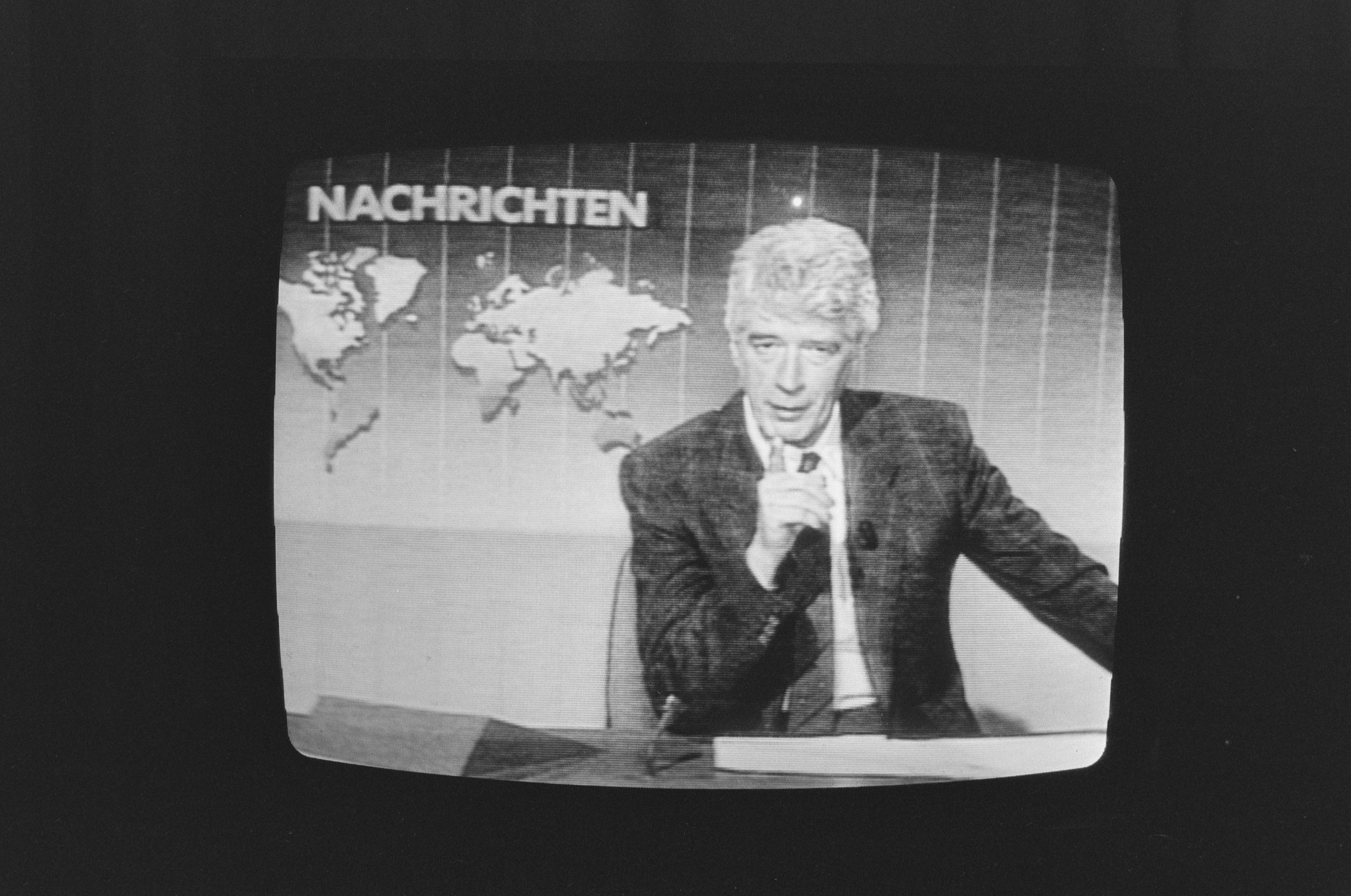
Carrell hosting Rudis Tagesshow in 1987

In 1981, Carrell premiered Rudis Tagesshow, a 30-minute weekly Saturday night sketch show based on the British Not the Nine O'Clock News (a comedic spoof of Germany's Tagesschau, similar to its source material satirising the BBC Nine O'Clock News).

On 11 November 1983, Carrell premiered De 1, 2, 3 Show, a twelve-episode series based on the Spanish game show Un, dos, tres... responda otra vez. This was a success, and Das Erste premiered a German version called Die verflixte 7 on 7 April 1984, which lasted until 5 December 1987.

Carrell had less success with Unter dem Regenbogen, a variety game show more similar to the British interpretation of Am laufenden Band. The first episode went out on 31 December 1983. Carrell believed the show was better aired on weekdays, yet he did not have time in the schedules since Rudis Tagesshow was still on the air. The show was canned after airing only one of its five planned episodes.

In 1987, Carrell caused a diplomatic rift between Germany and Iran on Rudis Tagesshow with a sketch in which veiled women threw their undergarments at someone dressed like Iran's Supreme Leader Ayatollah Khomeini. The Iranian government responded by expelling two German diplomats and permanently closing the Goethe Institute in Tehran. Rudis Tagesshow ended in 1989.

On 9 October 1987, he premiered Herzblatt, a show based on The Dating Game on Das Erste and the Austrian ORF, which had been turned down by Günther Jauch. He stayed with the show until 1993, when he was succeeded by Rainhard Fendrich.

On 5 March 1988, he hosted a revival of Die Rudi Carrell Show with the subtitle Laß dich überraschen. This iteration of the show had a format similar to Surprise Surprise and attracted up to 17 million viewers. From 1990, it was aired as a lead-in to the Eurovision Song Contest, which Carrell had participated in thirty years previously.

=== RTL ===
Carrell moved to RTL in 1992, ending Die Rudi Carrell Show, to host Die Post geht ab!, a revival of Am laufenden Band with the cooperation of Deutsche Bundespost.

Die Post geht ab! ended after one series, but Carrell would have more success on RTL with 7 Tage, 7 Köpfe, a satirical panel show which Carrell hosted until his retirement in 2002.

== Death ==
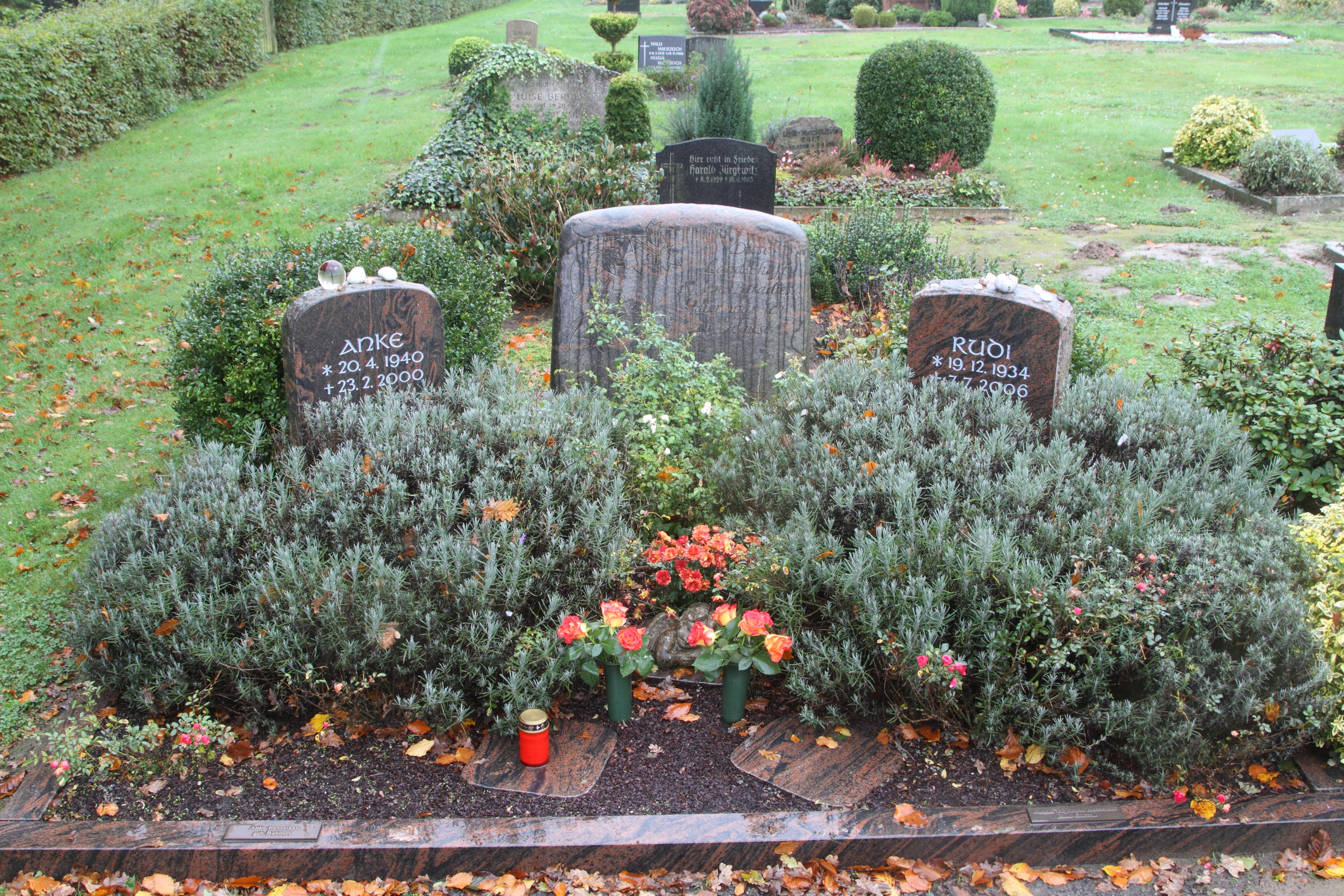
Carrell's grave in Berlin

In an interview in November 2005, Carrell confirmed to the magazine Bunte that he was suffering from lung cancer. He died on 7 July 2006 in Bremen, Germany, aged 71.

== Literature ==
- Carrell, Rudi (1979). Gib mir mein Fahrrad wieder [Give me my bike back] (in German). Wien/München/Zürich/Innsbruck: Molden Verlag. ISBN 978-3-21700-981-3.
- Schiweck, Ingo; von Osterhausen, Hans-Jürgen; Schult, Susanne (2005). "Lass dich überraschen": Niederländische Unterhaltungskünstler in Deutschland nach 1945 ["Let yourself be surprised": Dutch entertainers in Germany after 1945] (in German). Münster: Agenda. ISBN 978-3-89688-255-4.
- Schult, Susanne (2000). Rudi Carrell: das Image eines Stars in der Geschichte des deutschen Fernsehens [Rudi Carrell: the image of a star in the history of German television] (in German). Osnabrück: Der Andere Verlag. ISBN 978-3-93436-687-9.

Awards and achievements
Preceded by Teddy Scholten with "Een beetje"	Netherlands in the Eurovision Song Contest; 1960	Succeeded by Greetje Kauffeld with "Wat een dag"
