= A Burlesque on Carmen =

1915 film

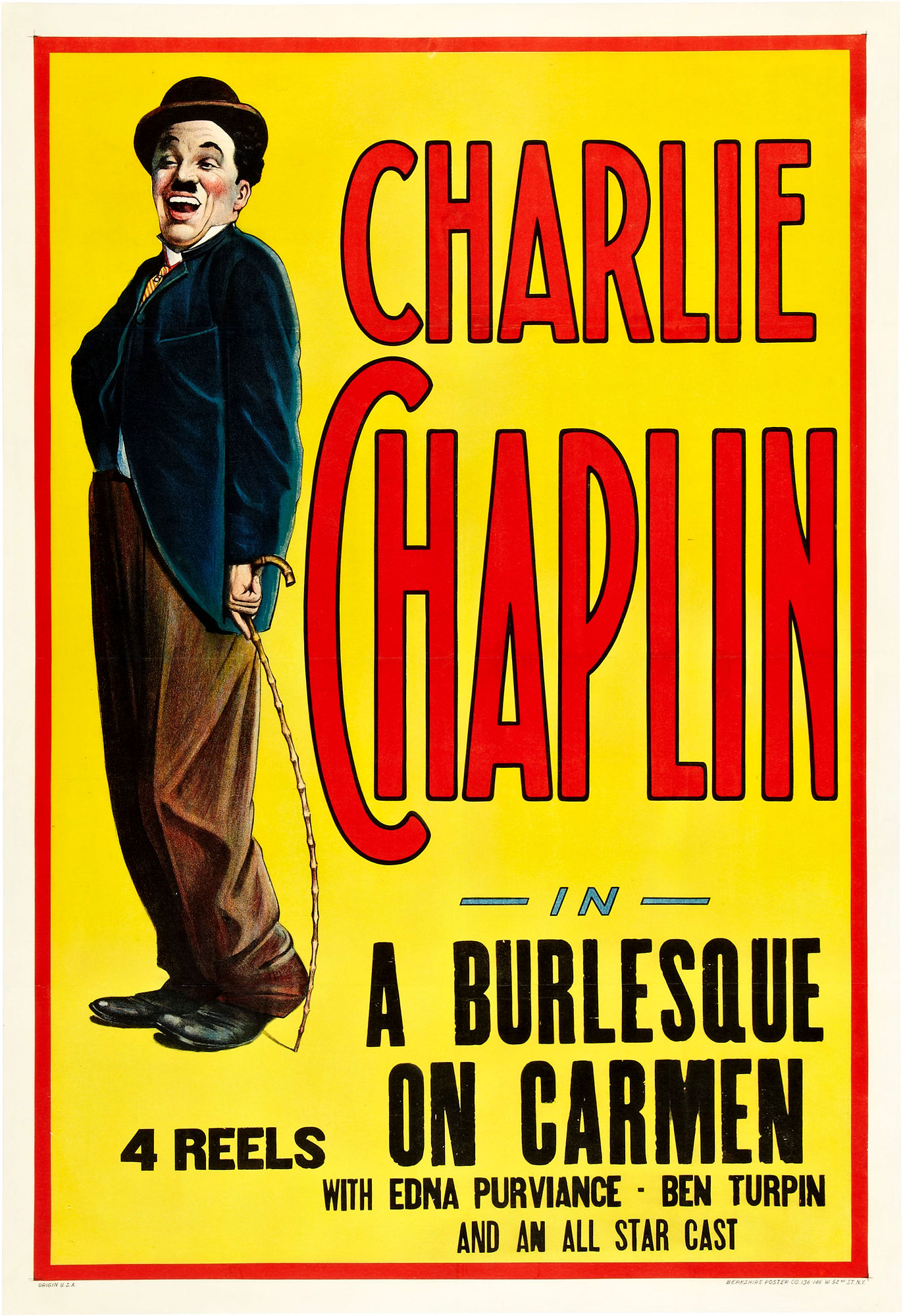
- Film poster
- Directed by: Charlie Chaplin
- Written by: Prosper Mérimée; Charlie Chaplin
- Produced by: Jess Robbins; George K. Spoor
- Starring: Charlie Chaplin; Jack Henderson; Edna Purviance; Leo White
- Cinematography: Roland Totheroh
- Edited by: Charlie Chaplin
- Music by: Hugo Riesenfeld
- Production company: Essanay Studios
- Distributed by: General Film Company
- Release date: December 18, 1915
- Running time: 31 minutes (1915); 44 minutes (1928 sound reissue)
- Country: United States
- Languages: Silent (English intertitles)

A Burlesque on Carmen is a 1915 film and Charlie Chaplin's thirteenth for Essanay Studios, originally released as Carmen on December 18, 1915. Chaplin played the leading man and Edna Purviance played Carmen. The film is a parody of Cecil B. DeMille's Carmen 1915, which was itself an interpretation of the popular novella Carmen by Prosper Mérimée.

Chaplin's original version was a tightly paced two-reeler, but in 1916 after he had moved to Mutual, Essanay reworked the film into a four-reel version called A Burlesque on Carmen, or Charlie Chaplin's Burlesque on Carmen, adding discarded footage and new scenes involving a subplot about a gypsy character played by Ben Turpin. This longer version was deeply flawed in pacing and continuity, and not representative of Chaplin's initial conception. Chaplin sued Essanay but failed to stop the distribution of the longer version; Essanay's tampering with this and other of his films contributed significantly to Chaplin's bitterness about his time there. The presence of Essanay's badly redone version is likely the reason that A Burlesque on Carmen is among the least known of Chaplin's early works. Historian Ted Okuda calls the two-reel original version the best film of Chaplin's Essanay period, but derides the longer version as the worst.

Further reissues followed, for instance a synchronized sound version in 1928 by Quality Amusement Corporation. It was re-edited from the 1916 Essanay reissue, with a newly shot introduction written by newspaper columnist Duke Bakrak. This version, with rewritten title cards, poor sequencing, and "fuzzy" in appearance from generation loss, can be found today on some budget home video releases. Film preservationist David Shepard studied Chaplin's court transcripts and other evidence to more closely reproduce the original Chaplin cut. This version was released on DVD by Image Entertainment in 1999 and has since been restored a second time in HD.

== Plot ==
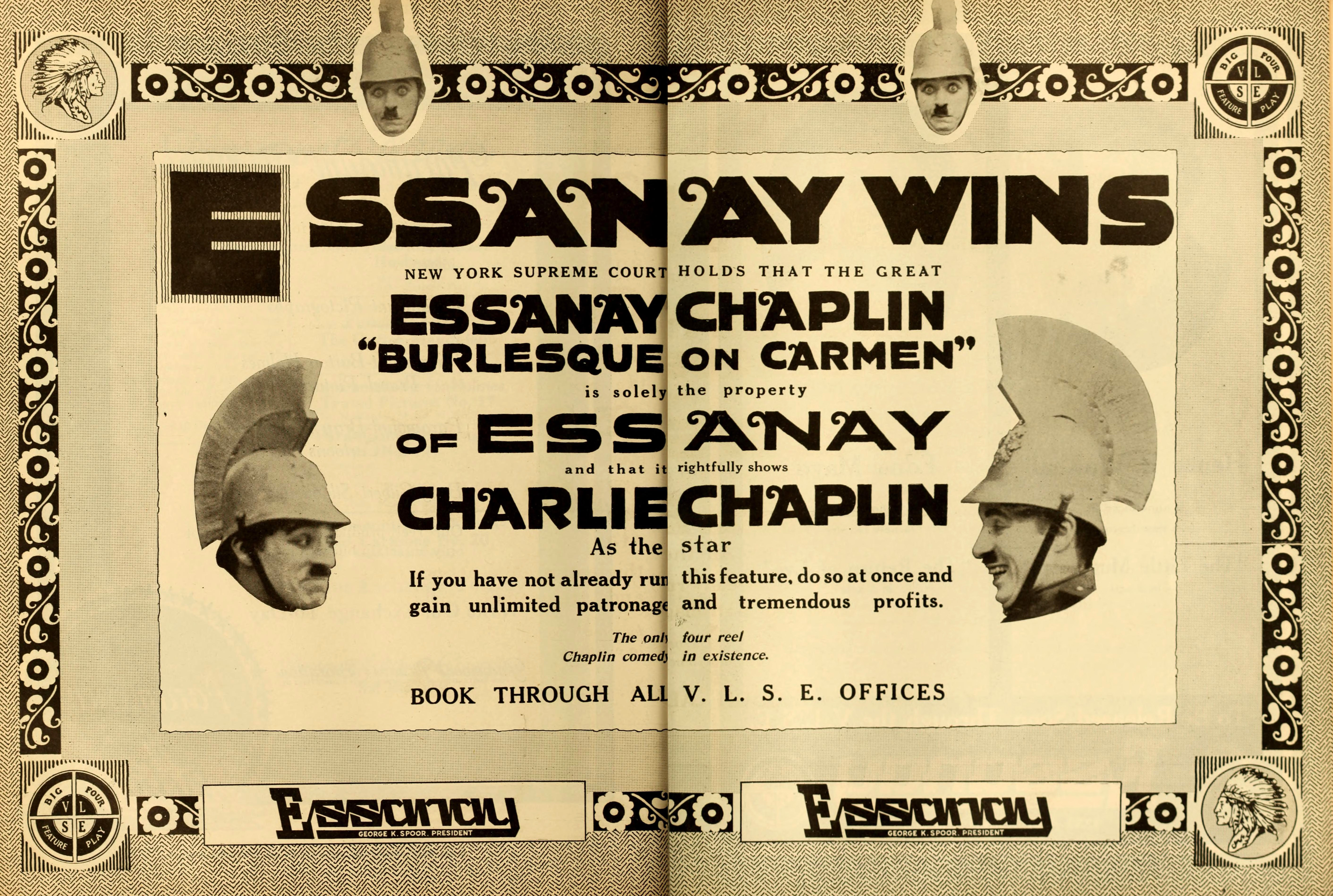
1916 advertisement

Carmen, a gypsy seductress is sent to convince Darn Hosiery, the goofy officer in charge of guarding one of the entrances to the city of Sevilla, to allow a smuggling run. She first tries to bribe him but he takes the money and refused to let the smuggled goods in.

She then invites him to Lillas Pastia's inn where she seduces him. After a fight at the tobacco factory where Carmen works, he has to arrest her but later lets her escape. At Lillas Pastia's inn, he kills an officer who is also in love with her and has to go into hiding and he joins the gang of smugglers.

Carmen meets the famous toreador Escamillo and falls in love with him. She accompanies him to a bullfight but Darn Hosiery waits for her and when she tells him that she no longer loves him, he stabs her to death. But it is not for real, Chaplin shows that the knife was fake and both smile at the camera.

== Cast ==
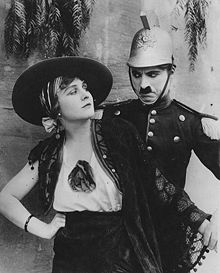
Purviance and Chaplin

- Charlie Chaplin - Darn Hosiery
- Edna Purviance - Carmen
- Ben Turpin - Remendados, the Smuggler (only in reworked 1916 version)
- Jack Henderson - Lillas Pastia
- Leo White - Morales, Officer of the Guard
- John Rand - Escamillo the Toreador
- May White - Frasquita
- Bud Jamison - Soldier of the Guard
- Lawrence A. Bowes - Gypsy
- Frank J. Coleman - Soldier

== Background ==
The story of Carmen was very popular in the 1910s, and two films under this title were released earlier in 1915. One was directed by Raoul Walsh, in which stage actress Theda Bara played Carmen, and the other by Cecil B. DeMille, in which the part was played by opera star Geraldine Farrar. DeMille's film received positive reviews but Chaplin thought it was ripe for parody.

== Production ==
In his sequencing, Chaplin followed closely the structure of the DeMille production, using very similar sets and costumes, and he used Riesenfeld's music. At the end, Chaplin indulges in an early example of breaking the fourth wall, turning to the camera to show laughingly that his character had not really killed Carmen. The film was released as a two-reeler at the end of 1915, when Chaplin's contract with Essanay Studios was up. After he had left, the studio added two reels' worth of non-Chaplin material and re-released the film in 1916.

== Music ==
A Burlesque on Carmen, as produced in 1999 by David Shepard.

David Shepard's 1999 restoration was released with a Robert Israel score, based on Bizet's music. A score was commissioned from Timothy Brock by Teatro de la Zarzuela de Madrid, and released in 2013 by the Cineteca di Bologna and Lobster Films for their Chaplin Essanay Project restoration. Brock also based his score on the opera by Bizet, but performed in a 1920s style. Both versions have been released numerous times on home video.

== Reception ==
In reviewing the four-reel version of this film that Essanay released in April 1916, four months after Chaplin's contract had expired with the studio, Julian Johnson of Photoplay panned the lengthy re-release of this comedy. Johnson declared, "In two reels this would be a characteristic Chaplin uproar. Four reels is watering the cream."
