= Girls in Trouble =

1971 German film

- German: Paragraph 218 – Wir haben abgetrieben, Herr Staatsanwalt
- Directed by: Eberhard Schröder; Rob Houwer
- Written by: Günther Heller
- Produced by: Rob Houwer
- Starring: Astrid Frank; Petra Verena Milchert; Doris Arden; Sybil Danning; Renate Kasché
- Cinematography: Klaus Werner
- Edited by: Ursula Goetz-Dickopp; Ingeborg Taschner; Sophie Mikorey
- Production companies: Rob Houwer Film & TV
- Release date: 2 September 1971
- Running time: 83 minutes
- Country: West Germany
- Language: German

Girls in Trouble (German: Paragraph 218 - Wir haben abgetrieben, Herr Staatsanwalt) is a 1971 West German film directed by Rob Houwer and Eberhard Schröder. It addresses the practice of abortion in West German society and caused a scandal in connection with the reform debate on the criminalization of abortion.

== Plot ==
Nine stories of female protagonists are used to address the discussion surrounding paragraph 218 of the Criminal Code on abortion and to question it in the context of the sexual revolution. According to the then version of Section 218 of the Criminal Code, "a woman who kills her unborn child or allows it to be killed by another person" was punished with imprisonment of up to five years.

One setting involves a criminal trial against a desperate girl who has fallen into the hands of an abortionist. A flashback shows Miss Breuer's story. After finding a job in a Munich laundromat, Klaus twice rescues her from drunks. When she finally becomes pregnant with his child, she seeks out a quack who performs the abortion on the kitchen table. When the girl collapses at home, her landlady calls a doctor.

Thirteen-year-old Gabi is raped by two boys. When her doctor tells her that Section 218 of the German Criminal Code prohibits him from performing an abortion, she travels to Sweden.

In another scenario, the mayor's daughter is denied the pill and barely survives the subsequent abortion.

Back in the courtroom, the judge learns that his own wife has also had an abortion.

== Cast ==
- Astrid Frank as Ulla
- Petra Verena Milchert
- Doris Arden
- Sybil Danning as Frau des Richters
- Renate Kasché
- Josef Fröhlich
- Josef Moosholzer
- Michel Jacot
- Enzi Fuchs as Krankenschwester
- Wolf Ackva
- Alexandra Bogojevic
- Rosl Mayr as Kurpfuscherin

== Release and reception ==
The Lexikon des internationales Films considered the movie to be an "educational film" that capitalized on the debate surrounding reforms of Paragraph 218, which prohibits abortion. The nine vignettes are intended to clarify "how it comes about and why a woman dares to take this final step"; however, the magazine said the film speculates on the voyeurism of conservative viewers. Features such as inserted "expert opinions" serve to give the film a "serious character."

A Frankfurter Rundschau review dated 25 August 1971 described the film as a "morally strained collection of outdated fictional and documentary scenes that fall far short of the current state of discussion."

The film was released in the US in 1975 as Girls in Trouble on a double bill with Working Girls. It made $2 million.
