= Carmen (1915 Cecil B. DeMille film) =

1915 film

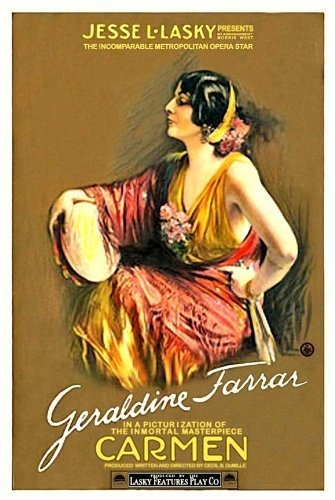
- Film poster
- Directed by: Cecil B. DeMille
- Written by: William C. deMille
- Based on: Carmen by Prosper Mérimée
- Produced by: Jesse L. Lasky; Cecil B. DeMille
- Starring: Geraldine Farrar
- Cinematography: Alvin Wyckoff
- Edited by: Anne Bauchens; Cecil B. DeMille
- Music by: Hugo Riesenfeld; Samuel L. Rothafel
- Production company: Lasky Feature Play Company
- Distributed by: Paramount Pictures
- Release dates: October 31, 1915; November 1, 1915 (general release)
- Running time: 65 minutes (4512 feet: 5 reels); 57 minutes (edited 1918 re-release)
- Country: United States
- Language: English intertitles
- Budget: $23,429
- Box office: $147,599

Carmen

Carmen is a 1915 American silent drama film directed by Cecil B. DeMille. The film is based on the novella Carmen by Prosper Mérimée. The existing versions of this film appear to be from the re-edited 1918 re-release.

== Plot ==
A group of smugglers are trying to enter Spain, but Don José, an officer of the law, refuses to accept a bribe, so they hatch a plot to seduce him using a gypsy girl; Carmen. Don José becomes obsessed with her and kills a fellow officer who disrespects Carmen causing him to flee and join the smugglers. He soon finds out Carmen is leaving to go to Seville and he secretly follows her. While there she gets married and enraged Don kills her and then himself.

== Cast ==
- Geraldine Farrar as Carmen
- Wallace Reid as Don José
- Pedro de Cordoba as Escamillo
- Horace B. Carpenter as Pastia
- William Elmer as Morales
- Jeanie Macpherson as Gypsy girl
- Anita King as Gypsy girl
- Milton Brown as Garcia
- Tex Driscoll
- Raymond Hatton as Spectator at Bullfight (uncredited)

== Production ==
DeMille had intended to film a musical version of Georges Bizet's opera Carmen; however, its libretto was under copyright, so DeMille instructed his screenwriter brother William to base his scenario on the public domain novella Carmen by Prosper Mérimée. The novella's Carmen was more wilful and manipulative than the opera version.

Composer Hugo Riesenfeld arranged the orchestral score, his first of many for film, which was based on that of Bizet's opera. It was performed at the premiere and other prestigious screenings. There have been two restorations of Riesenfeld's score: the first was by Gillian Anderson, recorded with the London Philharmonic Orchestra in 1996. Timothy Brock recorded the second in 1997 with the Olympia Chamber Orchestra. Both recordings have accompanied various releases of the restored film on home video.

== Reception ==
Carmen was praised as a "triumph of superb acting and magnificent scenery" in Motion Picture Magazine. "No small share of this artistic success is due to Mr. Wallace Reid's sympathetic interpretation of Don José," they added. "The 'Carmen' film will, in its own way, stand alongside 'The Birth of a Nation' as an epochmaker," Photoplay said in their review. One of their few complaints was on the film's faithfulness to Carmen's character of the Mérimée story.

The New-York Tribune described it as "The most interesting example of the new art of the photoplay. Miss Farrar's personality is admirably suited to the screen, and her facial expression was excellent." "Geraldine Farrar's 'Carmen' makes as dramatic an appeal to the eye as her voice ever did to the ear," said The San Francisco Call & Post, "The resolution of Geraldine Farrar, the beautiful and gifted star, to employ her talents in the attaining of success in the films is one of the greatest steps in advancing the dignity of the motion pictures. Miss Farrar's 'Carmen' in the films is the greatest triumph the motion picture has yet achieved over the speaking stage."

Geraldine Farrar came in fourth place in the 1916 "Screen Masterpiece" contest held by Motion Picture Magazine for her performance as Carmen, with 17,900 votes. She was the highest ranking actress and was behind Francis X. Bushman in Graustark, Henry B. Walthall in The Birth of a Nation, and the number one winner, Earle Williams, in The Christian. Theda Bara's performance of the same role received 9,150 votes.

=== Canadian controversy ===
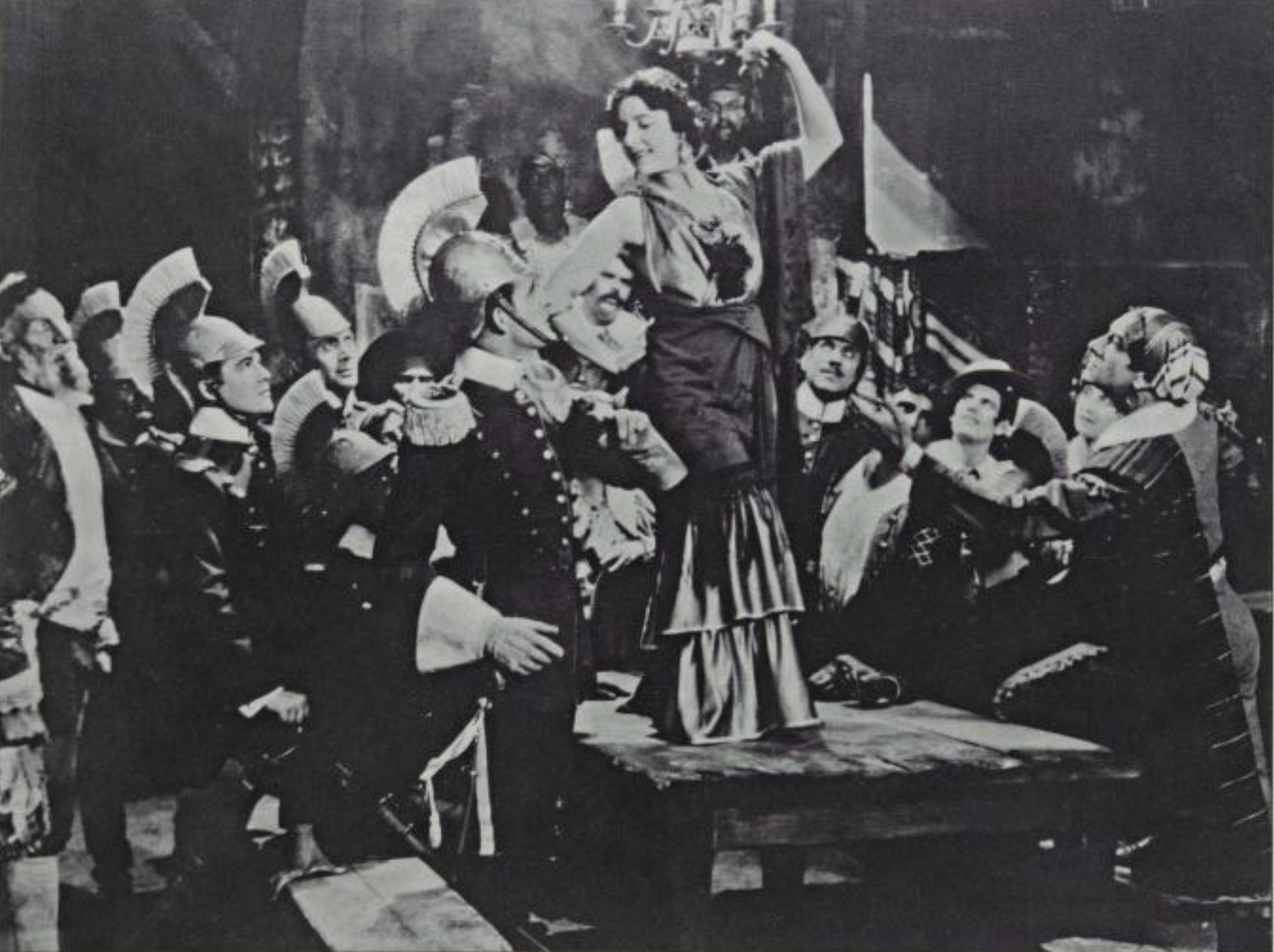
Scene from Carmen.

The film was released during the early years of World War I when allied countries, including the British Commonwealth, were at war with Germany. Biographer and film critic Edward Wagenknecht reports that a contretemps briefly clouded Farrar’s screen debut in Carmen. Farrar, while in Canada—a Commonwealth country—had made public comments that were interpreted by some Canadians as pro-German. Farrar, an American by birth and a Bostonian by upbringing, had forged many personal and professional friendships on the continent of Europe during her operatic career. Among her intimate admirers were members of the German imperial family. The United States was not at war with Germany, and as such “Farrar did not think it necessary to join in the crusade of hate then raging.”

Paramount movie producer Jesse L. Lasky, alarmed at the prospect of losing market shares among nationalistic movie patrons in Canada, took steps to correct it. Wagenknecht writes:

Lasky gravely assured his Canadian customers that Farrar had been paid outright for her work in Carmen and would receive no profits from [ticket sales], after which, one may hope, they could view it with a clear conscience…

== Preservation ==
Complete prints of Carmen are held by the George Eastman Museum, Gosfilmofond, the Museum of Modern Art and the BFI. The MoMA and Eastman prints are on 35 mm film.

== See also ==
- Carmen, (1915) a lost film adaption directed by Raoul Walsh
- A Burlesque on Carmen (1915) parody by Charlie Chaplin
- The House That Shadows Built (1931) promotional film released by Paramount
