= Rabe v. Washington =

- Supreme Court of the United States

Argued February 29, 1972 Decided March 20, 1972
- Full case name: William Rabe v. State of Washington
- Citations: 405 U.S. 313 (more) 92 S. Ct. 993; 31 L. Ed. 2d 258

Case history
- Prior: State v. Rabe, 79 Wash. 2d 254, 484 P.2d 917 (Wash. 1971).

Holding
- A state may not criminally punish a drive-in theater manager for violating an obscenity law if the statute has not given fair notice that the location of the theater was an element of the offense.

Court membership
- Chief Justice Warren E. Burger Associate Justices William O. Douglas · William J. Brennan Jr. Potter Stewart · Byron White; Thurgood Marshall · Harry Blackmun; Lewis F. Powell Jr. · William Rehnquist

Case opinions
- Per curiam
- Concurrence: Burger, joined by Rehnquist

Laws applied
- U.S. Const. amends. I, VI, XIV

Rabe v. Washington, 405 U.S. 313 (1972), was a decision by the United States Supreme Court involving the application of obscenity laws and criminal procedure to the states. On 29 August 1968, William Rabe, the manager of a drive-in movie theater in Richland, Washington, was arrested on obscenity charges for showing the film Carmen, Baby. Due to First Amendment concerns, the local court convicted Rabe not on the basis that the film as a whole was obscene, but that exhibiting it in a drive-in theater was. The Supreme Court reversed the conviction holding that the citizens of Washington had no notice under the Sixth Amendment that the place where a film was shown was an element of the offense.

== Obscenity law ==
The First Amendment puts protection for expressive content in terms that are both sweeping and absolute: "Congress shall make no law... abridging the freedom of speech, or of the press" Despite this broad protection, the roots of U.S. attempts to legally suppress obscenity extend back to the English common law offense of obscene libel and censorship of stage plays by the Master of the Revels.

American definitions of obscene material were variable and sporadic until 1879, when the test adopted in the English case Regina v. Hicklin (1868) was used in the prosecution of D. M. Bennett. This test regarded all material tending "to deprave and corrupt those whose minds are open to such immoral influences" as obscene, regardless of its artistic or literary merit. This same test was adopted by the United States Supreme Court in Rosen v. United States, 161 U.S. 29 (1896). Under this test, works such as Honoré de Balzac's Contes Drolatiques, Gustave Flaubert's Madame Bovary, James Joyce's Ulysses, (Note: Joyce's work is famously oblique, which one commenter said "made an obscenity judgement a feat of imagination." Even New York Society for the Suppression of Vice Executive Secretary John S. Sumner, who filed the complaint, perhaps understandably missed "the most scandalous aspect" of the passage on which the book was found obscene: that Leopold Bloom is masturbating while watching Gerty McDowell on the beach: "O sweety all your little white I made me do we too naughty darling.") and D. H. Lawrence's Lady Chatterley's Lover had all been subject to suppression under the federal Comstock Laws.

In the 1957 case Roth v. United States 354 U.S. 476 the Supreme Court created a new, stricter definition of obscene material as media where "...to the average person, applying contemporary community standards, the dominant theme of the material, taken as a whole, appeals to prurient interest." This definition repudiated the former practice of finding the most shocking passages and presenting them out of context. The new definition led to much confusion, however, over what terms such as "contemporary community standards" meant in practice.

In 1966, a trio of cases (Memoirs v. Massachusetts 383 U.S. 413, Ginzburg v. United States 383 U.S. 463 (1966), and Mishkin v. New York 383 U.S. 502 (1966)) provided the Court with an opportunity to create more clarity on these points. These three cases resulted in no less than fourteen separate opinions so that lower courts were left in even greater confusion on what constituted obscenity. Justice Harlan even wrote in dissent that: "...no person, not even the most learned judge, much less a layman, is capable of knowing in advance... whether certain material comes within the area of "obscenity" as that term is confused by the Court today."

== Prior history ==
The movie Carmen, Baby was an American-German-Yugoslav romantic drama based on Prosper Mérimée's novella Carmen. The film's director Radley Metzger had begun his film career importing titillating films from Europe. Metzger's new film "...walk[ed] a fine line by keeping his films suggestive but not descending fully into explicit hard-core content." The Supreme Court would later note it contained: "sexually frank scenes but no instances of sexual consummation are explicitly portrayed."

Carmen, Baby was playing at the Park Y Drive-In on 28 August 1968 while a city police officer watched from outside the fence. The following night, the officer returned to watch "almost the entire film" in company with the city attorney. Rabe was arrested and two reels of the film were seized as evidence. In Richland District Justice Court (Note: In the Washington State court system, District Courts generally dealt with misdemeanors, infractions and small-claims cases.) he was convicted of "wrongfully and unlawfully caus[ing] to be exhibited an obscene, indecent and immoral show." He appealed to the Benton County Superior Court (Note: Superior Courts were trial courts of general jurisdiction rather than appellate courts but were also the first step in appealing misdemeanors.) and a second trial was held. Rabe argued that under Roth, he could only be convicted if the film as a whole was devoid of artistic merit. The Superior Court did not find the picture was obscene in its entirety but instead that, "Individual portions or scenes of the movie ... are obscene and to passing motorists or persons and residents outside the theatre those individual scenes become a movie by themselves." The statute Rabe was convicted of violating made it a gross misdemeanor to distribute "any...motion picture film...which is obscene" but made no mention of the time or place being a factor in the offense. (Note: Revised Code of Washington 9.68.010 read at the time: "Every person who -- (1) Having knowledge of the contents thereof shall exhibit, sell, distribute, display for sale or distribution, or having knowledge of the contents thereof shall have in his possession with the intent to sell or distribute any book, magazine, pamphlet, comic book, newspaper, writing, photograph, motion picture film, phonograph record, tape or wire recording, picture, drawing, figure, image, or any object or thing which is obscene; or (2) Having knowledge of the contents thereof shall cause to be performed or exhibited, or shall engage in the performance or exhibition of any show, act, play, dance or motion picture which is obscene; Shall be guilty of a gross misdemeanor.")

Rabe appealed his conviction, eventually to the Washington Supreme Court. He argued that the trial courts had used an incorrect definition of obscenity. Rabe argued that Roth required the courts to consider the movie as a whole and that the lower courts should not have ruled that scenes taken out of context were obscene to those outside the theater.

The Washington Supreme Court began by saying that they were as confused about what constituted obscenity as anyone else: "...our resolution of the challenge must necessarily be guided by the United States Supreme Court's troubled and often confusing explication of what expression constitutes obscenity and what expression is entitled to the protective liberties of the federal constitution's First Amendment. Unfortunately, that court's attempt in Roth to define obscenity vel non (Note: Latin for "or not". Refers to an issue that a court wishes to indicate is in doubt.) has continued to disappoint and confuse the courts, commentators and community alike." They then concluded that, if the film had been seen only by consenting adults in a regular theater it was not wholly devoid of redeeming value and would probably not be obscene. Since the Park Y Drive-In Theater's screen had twelve to fifteen homes and a major street within viewing distance, however, the Court found that it was obscene for those who had "lurid images" inflicted into the normal course of their daily lives. Rabe's conviction was therefore affirmed.

== Decision ==
The Supreme Court's opinion was delivered as a per curiam one; meaning that it was the opinion of the Court acting as a collective body and not one Justice's opinion. Chief Justice Warren Burger authored a concurrence opinion, joined by Justice William Rehnquist. The majority opinion avoided the obscenity issue, instead accepting the Washington Supreme Court's determination that the film did not meet the Roth definition of obscene. The Court noted that neither context nor location were part of the crime Rabe supposedly committed: "[Rabe's] conviction was thus affirmed under a statute with a meaning quite different from the one he was charged with violating." Rabe had no notice that showing the same film in an indoor theater was permissible but that showing it in a drive-in was not. Burger's concurrence agreed on this question but indicated that such outdoor showings might be considered public nuisances. The Court therefore reversed his conviction.

== Effects of decision ==
This judgment became part of the common law doctrine that the Sixth Amendment applies to the states. It extended the holding of In re Oliver, 333 U.S. 257 (1948) that the right to notice in the Sixth Amendment of accusations protected defendants in state criminal courts.

Burger's point on public nuisances was later an issue in Erznoznik v. City of Jacksonville 422 U.S. 205 (1975).

The Court's decision avoided the obscenity issues that had been briefed by the parties. Enforcement of obscenity laws therefore continued to be erratic or abandoned completely. Attempts to clarify the Roth standard would have to wait until Miller v. California 413 U.S. 15 (1973) and Paris Adult Theatre I v. Slaton 413 U.S. 49 (1973).

The laws of Washington State were later revised to define "erotic material" instead of obscene media and to generally limit penalties to persons who distributed that type of material to minors.

== See also ==
- List of United States Supreme Court cases, volume 405
- List of United States Supreme Court cases
