= Christiane Rücker =

German actress

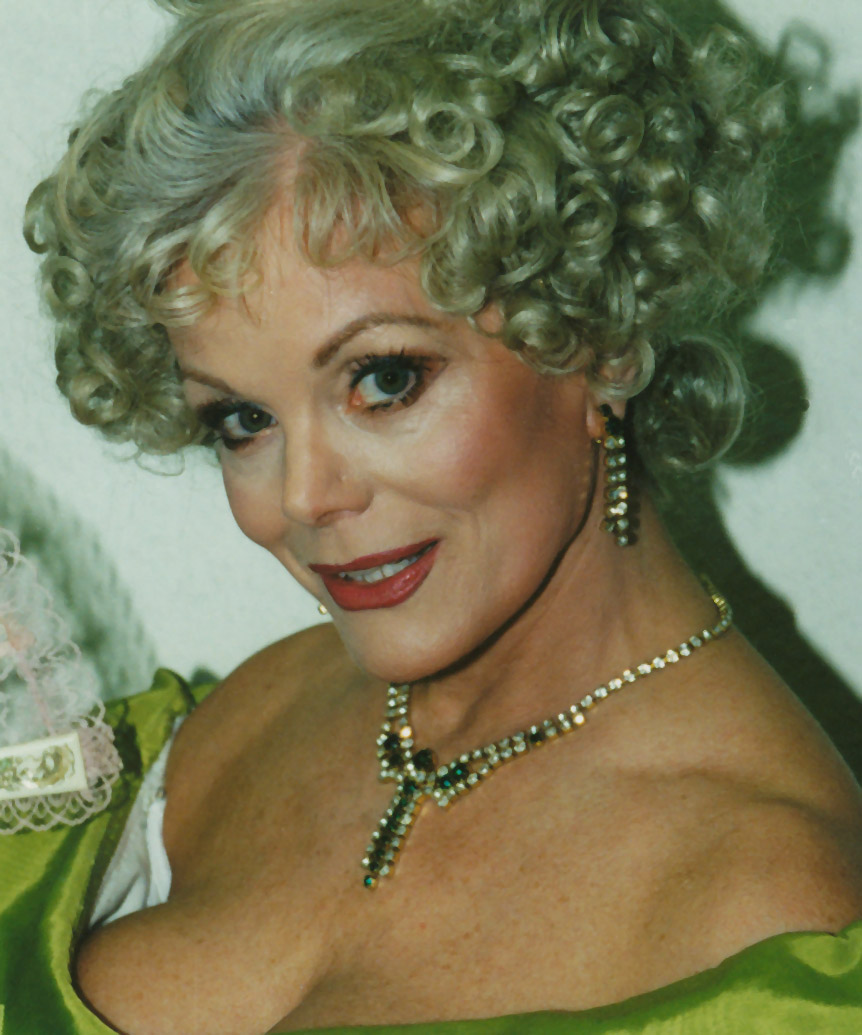
- Born: 12 June 1944 (age 81); Schertendorf, Lower Silesia, Germany
- Occupation: Actress
- Years active: 1964–present

Christiane Rücker (born 12 June 1944) is a German actress.

== Selected filmography ==
- Holiday in St. Tropez (1964)
- The Fountain of Love (1966)
- How to Seduce a Playboy (1966)
- The Blood Demon (1967)
- Carmen, Baby (1967)
- Take Off Your Clothes, Doll (1968)
- The Doctor of St. Pauli (1968)
- Frankenstein's Castle of Freaks (1974)
- The Unicorn (1978)
- Kottan ermittelt (1978–1983, TV series)

== Bibliography ==
- Christina Gerhardt & Marco Abel. Celluloid Revolt: German Screen Cultures and the Long 1968. Boydell & Brewer, 2019.
