= Black Market of Love =

1966 film

- Directed by: Ernst Hofbauer
- Written by: Ernst Hofbauer
- Produced by: Erwin C. Dietrich
- Starring: Uta Levka; Astrid Frank; Claus Tinney
- Cinematography: Andreas Demmer; Günther Knuth
- Music by: Frank Valdor
- Production company: Urania Film
- Distributed by: Team-Film
- Release date: 29 July 1966
- Running time: 83 minutes
- Country: West Germany
- Language: German

Black Market of Love (German: Schwarzer Markt der Liebe) is a 1966 West German crime film directed by Ernst Hofbauer and starring Uta Levka, Astrid Frank and Claus Tinney.

== Synopsis ==
The plot centers around a white slavery ring operating out of the Italian port of Genoa. Advertisements promising work as dancers lure young German women to Genoa, from where they are trafficked overseas.

== Cast ==
- Uta Levka as Uta
- Astrid Frank as Astrid
- Manfred Meurer as Exzellenz
- Karin Field as Rosanna
- Claus Tinney as Harald von Groepen
- Tilly Lauenstein as Countess
- Rolf Eden as Rolf
- Elio Manni as Flip
- Karl Gretler as Charly
- Omero Antonutti as Lemaire
- Christine Dass as Antoinette
- Rico Peter as Landlord
- Karin Glier as Mary
- Jochen Rock
- Li Hardes as Birgit
- Helga Schwartz as Anne

== Bibliography ==
- Eppenberger, Benedikt; Stapfer, Daniel (2006). Mädchen, Machos und Moneten – Die unglaubliche Geschichte des Schweizer Kinounternehmers Erwin C. Dietrich. Zürich: Verlag Scharfe Stiefel. ISBN 978-3-033-00960-8.
