= Rolf Eden =

German actor (1930–2022)

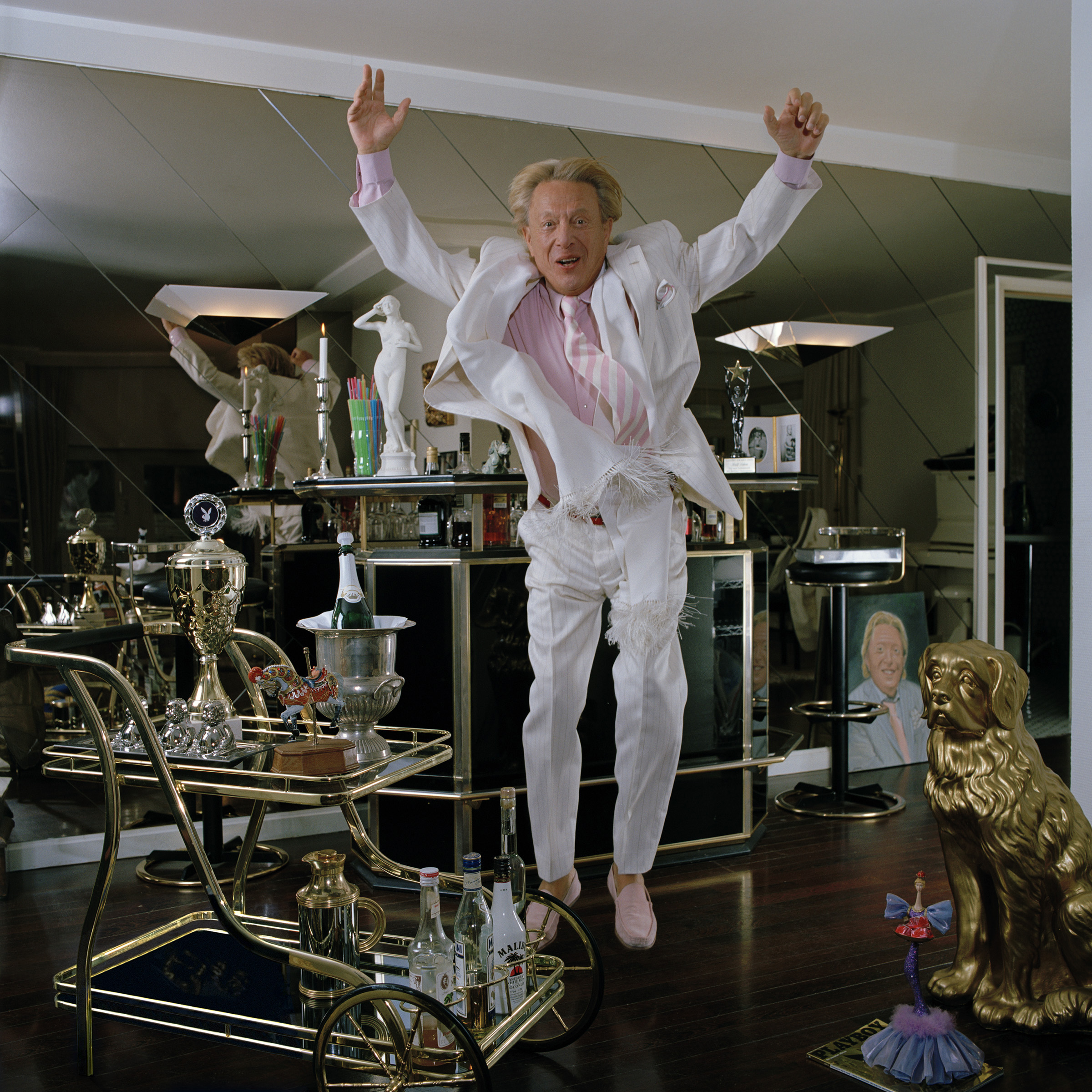
- Rolf Eden in 2017
- Born: 6 February 1930; Berlin, Germany
- Died: 11 August 2022 (aged 92); Berlin, Germany
- Occupation: Actor
- Years active: 1959–2016 (film)

Rolf Eden (1930–2022) was a German actor who appeared in cinema and television. A character actor, he appeared in a number of post-war films in supporting roles. He was also noted as an international celebrity playboy, notorious for the number of partners he had.

== Selected filmography ==
- Morgen wirst du um mich weinen (1959)
- The Testament of Dr. Mabuse (1962)
- The Seventh Victim (1964)
- Black Market of Love (1966)
- Hotel Clausewitz (1967)
- St. Pauli Between Night and Morning (1967)
- Death and Diamonds (1968)
- Schamlos (1968)
- We Two (1970)
- Soft Shoulders, Sharp Curves (1972)
- Casa d'appuntamento 1972)
- The Uranium Conspiracy 1978)
- Three Lederhosen in St. Tropez (1980)
- Red Love (1982)

== Bibliography ==
- Almond, Marc. In Search of the Pleasure Palace: Disreputable Travels. Pan Macmillan, 2005.
- Boyer, Dominic. The Life Informatic: Newsmaking in the Digital Era. Cornell University Press, 2013.
