= Take Off Your Clothes, Doll =

- Directed by: Ákos Ráthonyi
- Written by: Pierre Amant
- Produced by: Georges C. Stilly
- Starring: Anke Syring; Astrid Frank; Christiane Rücker
- Cinematography: Klaus von Rautenfeld
- Music by: Lothar Brandner
- Production company: TOP-FILM München
- Distributed by: Gloria Film
- Release date: 19 July 1968
- Running time: 86 minutes
- Country: West Germany
- Language: German

Take Off Your Clothes, Doll (German: Zieh dich aus, Puppe) is a 1968 West German comedy drama film directed by Ákos Ráthonyi and starring Anke Syring, Astrid Frank and Christiane Rücker.

== Synopsis ==
A young woman from a wealthy background runs away from her parents' home to live with her boyfriend. However, when he discovers that her father has cut her off financially, he loses any interest to continue their relationship and abandons her. She ends up working in a rough strip club before she is eventually rescued.

== Cast ==
- Anke Syring as Sylvia
- Astrid Frank as Marianne
- Christiane Rücker as Liane
- Gaby Gasser as Rita
- Linda Caroll as Jessica
- Petra Mood as Andrea
- Elisabeth Volkmann as Diana
- Christine Schuberth as Christine
- Annemarie Wendl as Garderobiere
- Felix Franchy as Micky
- Michael Berger as Johannes
- Michael Maien as Horst
- Günter Stahl as Lorenz
- Otto Stern as Direktor
- Arthur Binder as Krautkopf
- Wolfram Schaerf as Vater
- Gustaf Dennert as Schmall
- Walter Kraus as a taxi driver

== Bibliography ==
- Eppenberger, Beni & Stapfer, Daniel. Mädchen, Machos und Moneten: die unglaubliche Geschichte des Schweizer Kinounternehmers Erwin C. Dietrich. Verlag Scharfe Stiefel, 2006.
