= Astrid Frank =

German actress (born 1945)

- Born: 8 August 1945 (age 80); Berlin, Germany
- Other name: Eike Pulver
- Occupation: Actress
- Years active: 1950–1985 (film & TV)

Astrid Frank (born 1945) is a retired German film and television actress. She starred in number of sex comedies during the 1970s.

== Selected filmography ==
- The True Jacob (1960)
- A Woman for Life (1960)
- Charley's Aunt (1963)
- The Gentlemen (1965)
- Black Market of Love (1966)
- Take Off Your Clothes, Doll (1968)
- All About Women (1969)
- Salto Mortale (1969, TV series)
- La Horse (1970)
- The Bordello (1971)
- Holiday Report (1971)
- Girls in Trouble (1971)
- Au Pair Girls (1972)
- The Disciplined Woman (1972)
- The Associate (1979)

== Bibliography ==
- Harvey Fenton & David Flint. Ten Years of Terror: British Horror Films of the 1970s. FAB, 2001.
