= Hugo Riesenfeld =

Austrian-American composer (1879–1939)

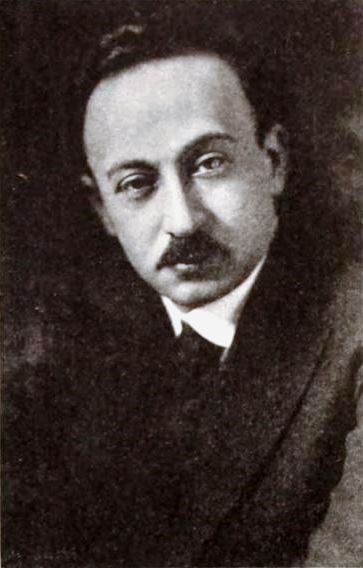
- Riesenfeld in 1920
- Born: January 26, 1879; Vienna, Austria-Hungary
- Died: September 10, 1939 (aged 60); Los Angeles, California, United States
- Education: Gesellschaft der Musikfreunde
- Occupations: violinist, conductor, composer
- Known for: film scoring
- Spouse: Mabel Gertrude Dunning
- Children: Janet Alcoriza
- Awards: Oscar nominations for Musical Director and Best Music for Make a Wish (1937)

Hugo Riesenfeld (January 26, 1879 – September 10, 1939) was an Austrian-American composer. As a film director, he began to write his own orchestral compositions for silent films in 1917, and co-created modern production techniques where film scoring serves an integral part of the action. Riesenfeld composed about 100 film scores in his career.

His most successful compositions were for Cecil B. DeMille's Joan the Woman (1917), The Ten Commandments (1923) and The King of Kings (1927); D. W. Griffith's Abraham Lincoln (1930); and the original scores to F. W. Murnau's Sunrise: A Song of Two Humans (1927) and Tabu (1931).

== Life and work ==
Born in Vienna, Riesenfeld's musical career began at the age of seven with a violin study at the Conservatory of the Gesellschaft der Musikfreunde in his city of birth, where he graduated at the age of 17 in piano, violin and composition degrees. He briefly played in the Vienna Philharmonic. By the end of the 19th century, he was playing with Arnold Schoenberg, Arthur Bodanzky, and Edward Falck in a local string quartet.

In 1907, Riesenfeld emigrated to New York City, where he worked until 1911 as concert-master for Oscar Hammerstein's Manhattan Opera Company. He served three seasons as conductor of musical comedy companies for Klaw & Erlanger, followed by a stint as concertmaster and conductor at the Century Opera. He did his first work in film when he conducted the accompaniment for Jesse L. Lasky's production of Carmen (1915).

Samuel Lionel Rothafel—later known as "Roxy" Rothafel—hired Riesenfeld in 1916 as conductor of, successively, the Rialto, the Rivoli, and the Criterion theatres until 1925, introducing the practice of long-run resident film musicians. These cinemas were among the first where runs of longer than a week became commonplace. In 1923, an article about Riesenfeld stated, "occasionally ten weeks the same piece with undiminished force – so knows he his audience" in a New York City article wrote the Viennese magazines about Riesenfeld. "He says, know the audience and know what you must show him, ever the secret of success at the theater and cinema." [...] "just customize and know what's there and what 'draws'."

== Phonofilm and Red Seal Pictures ==
On 15 April 1923, with inventor Lee de Forest, Riesenfeld co-presented a show at the Rivoli Theater in New York City of 18 short films made in the Phonofilm sound-on-film process.

In 1923, Riesenfeld formed The Red Seal Pictures Corporation, partnered with Edwin Miles Fadiman, Dr. Lee deForest, and Max Fleischer to distribute American and foreign films through their chain of 36 theaters that extended as far as Cleveland, Ohio. In May 1926, Max Fleischer began producing a series of sound versions of their popular "Bouncing Ball" Song CarTunes, using the Lee de Forest Phonofilm sound-on-film process. Red Seal Pictures Corporation filed for bankruptcy in late 1926; shortly afterward, the DeForest Phonofilm Corporation filed for bankruptcy in September 1927.

== Movie theaters and live orchestras ==
Most large movie theaters in the U.S. had their own orchestras for silent film accompaniment, with smaller theaters having just a theatre organ, photoplayer or piano. The musicians often relied on an already existing repertoire of opera and excerpts from other compositions. Riesenfeld began as one of the first to write original compositions for films. As an example, the "Brother's Theme" was a mainstay of the 1926 release of Beau Geste (published by Robbins-Engel Inc.).

Next to Albert William Ketèlbey and Ernö Rapée, Riesenfeld was a pioneer of modern, high-quality production of music. He also co-founded the cinema library music—topical collections of music for silent film orchestra and musicians also. "Mr. Riesenfeld puts much emphasis on the music in the movies", in an article about Riesenfeld and film music. "Orchestra with organ varies in its two large theatres. His organist gets $250 a week, 70 orchestra musicians are well-paid because the lowest wage is 70 dollars a week. [...] Of course, the business costs in America are quite different than ours. Mr. Riesenfeld explains that he must have a dose of 50,000 dollars per week to reach its expenses and to this purpose otherwise it zahle weekly 120,000 spectators as he. [...] News always appear in the first week in its theatres. [...] "Mr. Riesenfeld paid up to 6000 dollars a week for the presentation rights for a good movie."

When he wrote the music for the Western movie The Covered Wagon (1923), Riesenfeld was one of the most frequently employed film composers in Hollywood. From 1928 to 1930, he was general music director of United Artists. After that time, Riesenfeld worked mostly for independent productions.

Away from the film industry, he was orchestra conductor of the Los Angeles Symphony and as a composer in the classical sector. He composed the ballet Chopin's Dances (1905), the comic opera Merry Martyr (1913), the musical Betty Be Good (1921), Children's Suite (1928) and overtures, orchestral music, and songs.

During the years of 1924 and 1926, he conducted the Naumburg Orchestral Concerts, in the Naumburg Bandshell, Central Park, in the summer series.

== Illness and death ==
Riesenfeld died in 1939 in Los Angeles after a severe illness. His daughter Janet starred in some Mexican movies as a dancer and actress under the pseudonym Raquel Rojas and Janet Alcorzia and later became a screenwriter.

== Filmography ==
A selection of film compositions, unless otherwise noted:

- 1915: Carmen (as conductor) directed by Raoul Walsh
- 1917: Joan the Woman directed by Cecil B. DeMille
- 1918: A Christmas Fantasy (producer, director) short film
- 1919: Sahara directed by Arthur Rosson
- 1920: Humoresque directed by Frank Borzage
- 1921: La Tosca (new composition) directed by Edward José
- 1921: Reputation directed by Stuart Paton
- 1923: The Ten Commandments directed by Cecil B. DeMille
- 1923: The Covered Wagon directed by James Cruze
- 1923: The Hunchback of Notre Dame directed by Wallace Worsley
- 1925: Beggar on Horseback directed by James Cruze
- 1925: The Wanderer directed by Raoul Walsh
- 1926: The Volga Boatman directed by Cecil B. DeMille
- 1926: Old Ironsides directed by James Cruze
- 1926: Beau Geste directed by Herbert Brenon
- 1926: The Sorrows of Satan directed by D. W. Griffith
- 1927: Chang directed by Merian C. Cooper and Ernest B. Schoedsack
- 1927: Sunrise: A Song of Two Humans directed by F. W. Murnau
- 1927: The Cat and the Canary directed by Paul Leni
- 1927: The King of Kings directed by Cecil B. DeMille
- 1927: Uncle Tom's Cabin directed Harry A. Polard
- 1927: Old San Francisco directed by Alan Crosland
- 1928: The Battle of the Sexes directed by D. W. Griffith)
- 1928: The Cavalier directed by Irvin Willat
- 1928: The Awakening directed by Victor Fleming
- 1928: Two Lovers directed by Fred Niblo
- 1928: Looping the Loop directed by Arthur Robison
- 1929: Lucky Boy directed by Norman Taurog and Charles C. Wilson
- 1929: Condemned directed by Wesley Ruggles
- 1929: Bulldog Drummond directed by F. Richard Jones
- 1929: The Iron Mask directed by Allan Dwan
- 1929: Eternal Love directed by Ernst Lubitsch
- 1929: Coquette directed by Sam Taylor
- 1930: Abraham Lincoln directed by D. W. Griffith
- 1930: Hell's Angels (Höllenflieger) directed by Howard Hughes
- 1931: Tabu directed by F. W. Murnau
- 1932: White Zombie directed by Victor Halperin
- 1933: The Wandering Jew directed by Maurice Elvey
- 1934: The President Vanishes directed by William Wellman
- 1934: Little Men directed by Phil Rosen
- 1935: The Phantom Empire (serial) directed by Otto Brower and B. Reeves Eason
- 1935: Hard Rock Harrigan (music arranger) directed by David Howard
- 1936: Robinson Crusoe of Clipper Island (serial) directed by Ray Taylor and Mack V. Wright
- 1936: Daniel Boone (stock music) directed by David Howard
- 1937: The Painted Stallion (serial) directed by Alan James, Ray Taylor, and William Witney
- 1937: Make a Wish (music department) directed by Kurt Neumann
- 1938: Tarzan's Revenge directed by D. Ross Lederman
- 1938: Wide Open Faces directed by Kurt Neumann

Posthumous works:

- 1940: The Return of Frank James (stock music) directed by Fritz Lang
- 2003: The Making of 'The Last Man' (short documentary) directed by Luciano Berriatúa

Awards:

- 1938: Oscar nomination for best score for Make a Wish
