= Venus in Furs (1969 Dallamano film) =

- Directed by: Massimo Dallamano
- Written by: Inge Hilger; Fabio Massimo
- Produced by: Alfredo Leone (uncredited)
- Starring: Laura Antonelli; Régis Vallée; Werner Pochath
- Cinematography: Sergio D'Offizi
- Music by: Gian Franco Reverberi
- Release date: 1969
- Country: Italy

Venus in Furs (Italian: Venere in pelliccia) (also known as Devil in the Flesh) is a 1969 Italian erotic drama film directed by Massimo Dallamano. Based on the novel Venus in Furs by Leopold von Sacher-Masoch, the film was first released in 1969 in Germany under the title Venus im Pelz. In Italy, the film did not pass the censorship examination because of the sex scenes deemed too rough and all attempts to overcome the censorship's remarks, with various cut versions, were unsuccessful.

The film was eventually released in 1973 under the title Venere nuda, but even this cut version was confiscated after a few days for contempt of decency. In 1975, the film was finally released in Italian cinemas under the title Le malizie di Venere, in a heavily censored version which was altered by a new editing and by the introduction of new scenes filmed by Paolo Heusch, which turned the film plot into a giallo. The new title was a specific reference to lead actress Laura Antonelli's box-office success in Malizia (1973).

== Synopsis ==
Based on the infamous novel by Leopold Sacher-Masoch, the film follows the perverted passions of a young couple as Severin watches the beautiful Wanda writhing naked amongst furs. Being a peeping tom triggers a whirlpool of emotions due to a childhood episode which punishes voyeurism with pain.

== Cast ==
- Laura Antonelli: Wanda de Dunaieff
- Régis Vallée: Severin
- Loren Ewing: Bruno
- Renate Kasché: Gracia
- Werner Pochath: Manfred
- Mady Rahl: Helga
- Giacomo Furia: Lawyer
