= The Doctor of St. Pauli =

1968 film

- German film poster
- German: Der Arzt von St. Pauli
- Directed by: Rolf Olsen
- Written by: Rolf Olsen
- Starring: Curd Jürgens; Horst Naumann; Christiane Rücker
- Cinematography: Franz Xaver Lederle
- Edited by: Renate Willeg
- Music by: Erwin Halletz
- Production company: Terra Film
- Distributed by: Constantin Film
- Release date: 20 September 1968
- Running time: 101 minutes
- Country: West Germany
- Language: German

The Doctor of St. Pauli (German: Der Arzt von St. Pauli) is a 1968 West German crime film directed by Rolf Olsen and starring Curd Jürgens, Horst Naumann, and Christiane Rücker.

== Plot ==
In St Pauli, the red light district of Hamburg, a sympathetic Doctor helps treat the poor of the area. His villainous brother, by contrast, is associated with the rich and criminal.

== Partial cast ==
- Curd Jürgens as Dr. Jan Diffring
- Dieter Borsche as Pfarrer Feddersen
- Horst Naumann as Dr. Klaus Diffring
- Christiane Rücker as Margot Rau
- Heinz Reincke as Willi Nippes
- Marianne Hoffmann as Karin Steffen
- Fritz Wepper as Hein Jungermann
- Monika Zinnenberg as Gerda Heske
- Friedrich Schütter as Siegfried Gersum
- Suzanne Roquette as Elisabeth Langhoff
- Michael Conti as Helmut Weiher
- Astrid Fournell as Bärbel Harms
- Hans W. Hamacher as Kriminalrat Janson
- Claus Tinney as Partygast
- Carlo Liebmann as Lutz
- Karin-Ute Warstat as Ingrid Castell
- Peter Bach as Harry
- Manfred Reddemann as Benno
- Wolfgang Zerlett
- Ursula Dietz
- Britt Lindberg as Edeltraut
