= Carmen, Baby =

1967 film by Radley Metzger

- Theatrical release poster
- Directed by: Radley Metzger
- Screenplay by: Jesse Vogel
- Based on: Carmen by Prosper Mérimée
- Produced by: Radley Metzger
- Starring: Uta Levka; Claude Ringer; Carl Möhner; Barbara Valentin; Walter Wilz; Christiane Rücker
- Cinematography: Hans Jura
- Edited by: Humphrey Wood
- Music by: Daniel Hart
- Production company: Amsterdam Film Corporation
- Distributed by: Audubon Films (United States); Constantin Film (West Germany)
- Release dates: October 10, 1967 (United States); May 24, 1968 (West Germany)
- Running time: 97 minutes
- Countries: United States; West Germany; Yugoslavia
- Language: English
- Box office: $4.2 million (US/Canada rentals)

Carmen, Baby is a 1967 erotic drama film produced and directed by Radley Metzger, based on the 1845 novella Carmen by Prosper Mérimée.

== Premise ==
A liberated woman tempts a local police officer into a romantic entanglement with tragic consequences.

== Cast ==
- Uta Levka as Carmen
- Claude Ringer as José
- Barbara Valentin as Dolores
- Walter Wilz as Baby Lucas
- Christiane Rücker as Misty
- Art Brauss as Garcia
- Doris Arden as Darcy
- Michael Münzer as the magistrate
- Carl Möhner as Medicio

== Reception ==
Carmen, Baby, according to one reviewer, was the beginning of Metzger's successful style in his later films: that is, adapting "a literary classic in a gorgeous European locale with high polish and a goodly helping of sophisticated sex and seduction." Film critic Jesse Vogel noted that the film is an example of Metzger's signature style, "cool, classy, distant, with a distinctively European sensibility". According to Gary Morris of Bright Lights Film Journal, Carmen was "well played" by Uta Levka; lighting and camerawork by Hans Jura was "first-rate". The New York Times wrote that the film had "a rather classy look" and that the performers were "attractive" and the setting "beautiful".

== Legal issues ==
In the case of Rabe v. Washington, 405 U.S. 313 (1972), the Supreme Court of the United States decided that the manager of a drive-in movie theater could not be charged with obscenity for showing the film which was not wholly determined to be obscene, but only parts were, holding that the citizens of Washington State had no notice under the Sixth Amendment that the place where a film was shown was an element of the offense.

== Popular culture ==
Wally Lamb mentioned the bottle dance scene from Carmen, Baby in his 2016 book I'll Take You There.

== Notes ==
According to Steve Gallagher of Filmmaker, Radley Metzger's films, including those made during the Golden Age of Porn (1969–1984), are noted for their "lavish design, witty screenplays, and a penchant for the unusual camera angle". Clare Simpson of WhatCulture noted that his films were "highly artistic—and often cerebral ... and often featured gorgeous cinematography". Film and audio works by Metzger have been added to the permanent collection of the Museum of Modern Art (MoMA) in New York City.
