= All About Women (1969 film) =

- Directed by: Claude Pierson
- Written by: Huguette Boisvert; Claude Pierson
- Starring: Marlène Alexandre; Astrid Frank; Marie-Christine Auferil
- Cinematography: Jean-Jacques Tarbès
- Edited by: François Ceppi
- Music by: José Berghmans
- Production company: Pierson Productions
- Distributed by: Étoile Distribution
- Release date: 3 June 1969
- Running time: 82 minutes
- Countries: Canada; France
- Language: French

All About Women (French: À propos de la femme) is a 1969 French-Canadian drama film directed by Claude Pierson and starring Marlène Alexandre, Astrid Frank and Marie-Christine Auferil.

== Cast ==
- Marlène Alexandre as Sophie
- Astrid Frank as Joelle
- Marie-Christine Auferil as Martine
- Jean Perrin as Pascal
- Robert Piquet as Henri
- Philippe Delmar as Didier
- Marcel Portier as Le père
- Alexandre Mincer as Bob
- Jean-Loup Wolff as Gérard
- Malisa Longo as L'amie de Joëlle sur la plage
- Sonia Boisvenu
- Nadine Boyer-Vidal
- Marie Diaz
- Christine Haydar
- Gisèle Sornin
- Viviana Vanni

== Bibliography ==
- Michel Larouche & François Baby. L'aventure du cinéma québécois en France. XYZ, 1996.
