= Black Pearl (film) =

1934 Polish film

Czarna perła
- Directed by: Michał Waszyński
- Written by: Eugeniusz Bodo; Anatol Stern
- Music by: Henryk Wars
- Production company: Urania Film
- Release date: 20 December 1934
- Running time: 75 minutes
- Country: Poland
- Languages: Polish; French; Tahitian

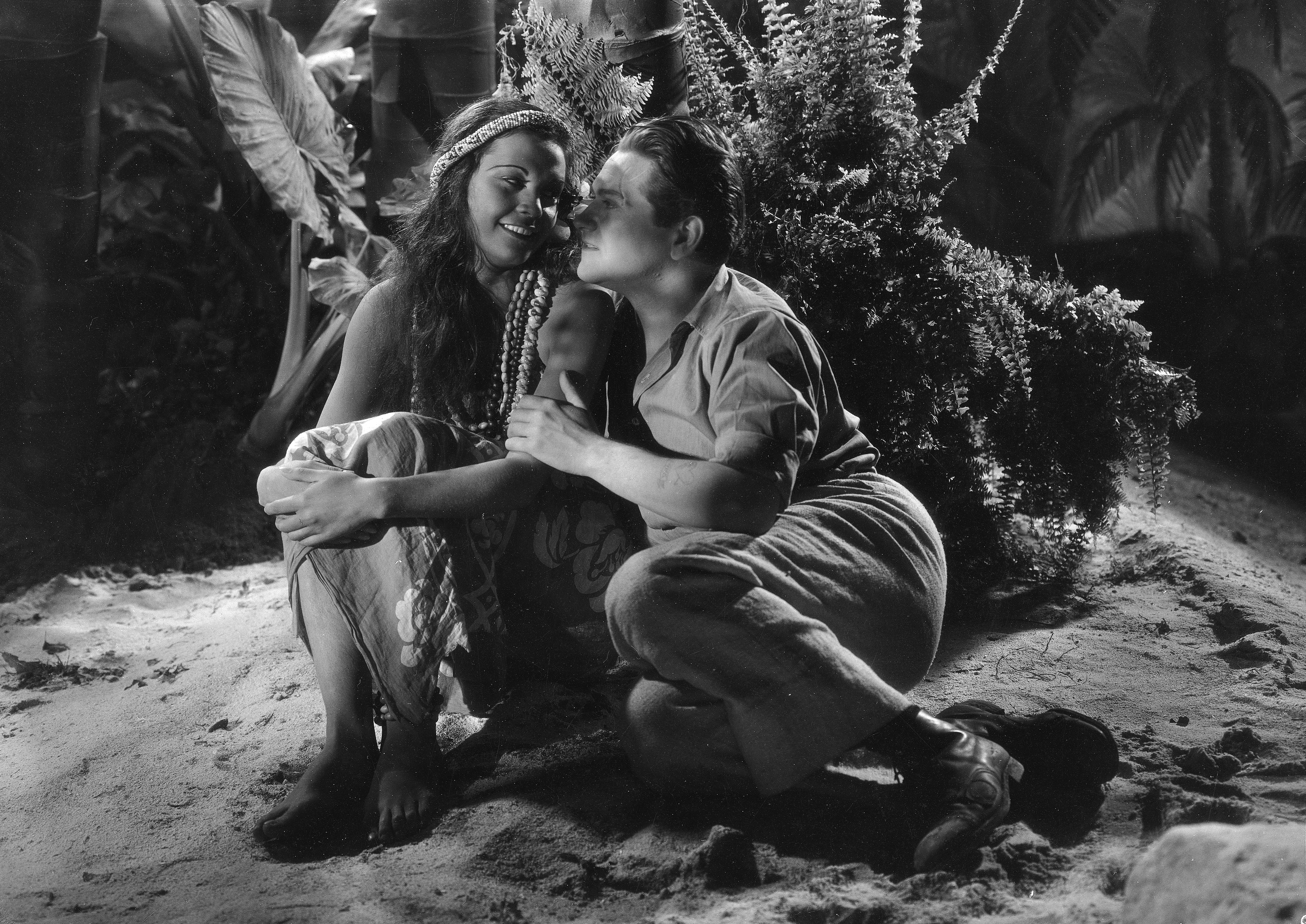
Reri as Moana and Eugeniusz Bodo as Stefan in a scene of Black Pearl

Black Pearl (Polish: Czarna perła) is a 1934 Polish romantic crime drama directed by Michał Waszyński. Produced by Urania Film, it stars Reri and Eugeniusz Bodo.

== Plot ==
Stefan, a Polish sailor, gets into a bar fight on the exotic island of Tahiti. The injured Pole is attended to by Moana, a young Tahitian woman. The young people fall in love and swear fidelity to each other. They decide to go to Poland together. When the time comes to leave, Stefan, driven by greed, steals the "sacred pearls" from a local cave. On returning to Poland, he sets up his own successful business. For profit, he makes deals with criminals and starts an affair with Rene, the wife of one of the partners, causing a lot of suffering to his Moana. The Tahitian woman feels that she will lose her beloved because she does not behave like a white woman. However, when Stefan falls victim to a robbery attack, she comes to his aid, shielding him with her own body from the bandit's bullet.

== Cast ==
- Reri as Moana
- Eugeniusz Bodo as Stefan Nadolski
- Lena Żelichowska as Rena Torn
- Michał Znicz as Krzysztof
- Antoni Różycki as Grzeszczyński, gang leader
- Franciszek Brodniewicz as Torn
- Henryk Rzętkowski as Antoni
