= Renate Kasché =

German actress (born 1945)

- Born: 1945 (age 80–81); Germany
- Occupation: Actress

Renate Kasché (also credited as Renate Cash) is a German actress known for such films as A Black Veil for Lisa, Josefine Mutzenbacher, Lady Frankenstein and Devil in the Flesh.

== Filmography ==
Year	Title	Role	Notes
1961	Wie einst im Mai	Ballet rat	TV film
1961	Davon träumen alle Mädchen	Uschi	
1962	Kohlhiesel's Daughters	Gritli	
1962–1963	Alle meine Tiere	Ruth Wegener	TV series
1963	Don Juan Comes Back From The War	Ice skater	TV film
1964	Tales of a Young Scamp	Ännchen Thoma	
1964	Hütet eure Töchter!	Christa	Anthology film
1964	Das Kriminalmuseum – Gesucht: Reisebegleiter	Flower girl	TV series episode
1964	Der Seitensprung		TV film
1964	Frau Luna	Stella	TV film
1965	Aunt Frieda	Ännchen Thoma	
1966	Onkel Filser – Allerneueste Lausbubengeschichten	Ännchen Schultheiß	
1966	Hallucination Generation	Lise	
1967	Valentin Katajews chirurgische Eingriffe in das Seelenleben des Dr. Igor Igorowitsch	Alla	TV film
1968	A Black Veil for Lisa	Marianne	
1968	Rinaldo Rinaldini (a.k.a. La Kermesse des Brigands)	Aurelia	TV series
1968	Beyond the Law	Teacher (uncredited)	
1969	Venus in Furs (a.k.a. Devil in the Flesh)	Gracia	
1969	Ehepaar sucht gleichgesinntes	Judith Hellmann	
1969	Ludwig auf Freiersfüßen (Ludwig on the Lookout for a Wife)	Ännchen Schultheiß	
1970	Josefine Mutzenbacher	Zenzi	
1971	Die nackte Gräfin (The Naked Countess)	Helene	
1971	Josefine Mutzenbacher II – Meine 365 Liebhaber	Zenzi	
1971	Die gefälschte Göttin	Woman of the Port	TV film
1971	Office Girls	Jutta Bornstedt	
1971	Hausfrauen-Report (Housewives Report)	Frau Gassner	
1971	Ehemänner-Report	Susi	
1971	Paragraph 218 – Wir haben abgetrieben, Herr Staatsanwalt (In Trouble)		
1971	Lady Frankenstein	Julia Stack	
1972	Die Klosterschülerinnen	(uncredited)	
1972	Laß jucken, Kumpel	Lore Gärtner	
1972	Frankenstein '80	Redhead in the car (uncredited)	
1973	Eine Armee Gretchen (She Devils of the SS)	Ulrike von Menzinger	
1973	Hausfrauen-Report 5		
1973	Junge Mädchen mögen’s heiß, Hausfrauen noch heißer	Ingrid Wandel	
1974	Bohr weiter, Kumpel	Elsbeth Speckmeier	
1974	Laß jucken, Kumpel 3. Teil – Maloche, Bier und Bett	Lore Gärtner	
1977	Lass knacken Willy		
1977	Emanuelle in America	Redhead (uncredited)	
1978	Liebesgrüße aus der Lederhose 4: Die versaute Hochzeitsnacht	Josefa	
1978	Liebesgrüße aus der Lederhose 5: Teil: Die Bruchpiloten vom Königssee	Josefa Brummberger	
1979	Son of Hitler	Reporter	
