= So Much Naked Tenderness =

1968 film

- Directed by: Günter Hendel
- Written by: Günter Hendel
- Produced by: Günter Hendel
- Starring: Erika Remberg; Erich Fritze; Lutz Hochstraate
- Cinematography: Franz Vass
- Edited by: Jochen Hessel
- Music by: Walter Geiger; Günter Hendel
- Production company: Alpha Cinetel Produktion
- Release date: 5 July 1968
- Running time: 83 minutes
- Country: West Germany
- Language: German

So Much Naked Tenderness (German: So viel nackte Zärtlichkeit) is a 1968 West German crime drama film directed by Günter Hendel and starring Erika Remberg, Erich Fritze and Lutz Hochstraate.

== Cast ==
- Erika Remberg as Kitty
- Erich Fritze as Peter Kremer
- Lutz Hochstraate as Jochen
- Doris Arden as Eva
- Klaus Krüger
- Günter Hendel as Priest
- Johannes Buzalski as Jimmy

== Bibliography ==
- Cowie, Peter. World Filmography, 1968. Tantivy Press, 1977.
