= A Black Veil for Lisa =

- Italian: La morte non ha sesso
- Directed by: Massimo Dallamano
- Screenplay by: Giuseppe Belli; Vittoriano Petrilli; Massimo Dallamano; Audrey Nohra
- Story by: Giuseppe Belli
- Starring: John Mills; Luciana Paluzzi; Robert Hoffmann
- Cinematography: Angelo Lotti
- Edited by: Daniele Alabiso
- Music by: Giovanni Fusco; Gian Franco Reverberi; Richard Markowitz (U.S. cut)
- Production companies: Filmes Cinematografica; Pan Film; Top Film
- Distributed by: Titanus (Italy); Nora-Filmverleih (West Germany)
- Release date: September 1968 (Italy)
- Running time: 95 minutes 88 minutes (U.S. cut)
- Countries: Italy; West Germany

A Black Veil for Lisa (Italian: La morte non ha sesso, lit. 'Death has no sex') is a 1968 giallo film directed and co-written by Massimo Dallamano, and starring John Mills, Luciana Paluzzi, and Robert Hoffmann. The plot is about a narcotics detective (Mills) as he investigates a drug ring and hires a hitman (Hoffman) to kill his wife (Paluzzi), suspecting her involvement.

== Plot ==
Lisa Buloff is dressed in black, including a veil, attending a funeral for an unspecified deceased loved one.

Weeks earlier, Willie Zoll is at a bar, prepared to share information with Inspector Franz Buloff, the lead investigator in the Hamburg narcotics department for Interpol, about the major drug world target Harry Schouermann. However, as Zoll turns into an alley, he is fatally stabbed by an unknown assailant, leaving behind the murder weapon and a dime-store disguise. Buloff is frustrated, as Zoll was their best lead. Two other contract killings have silenced potential witnesses and whistleblowers just before they were set to provide information to the police. Buloff's boss, Ostermeyer, is angered and insists that Buloff find another lead.

Returning home, Buloff confronts his wife Lisa. Although she had previous connections with Schouermann, Buloff believed she was not involved in his criminal activities and married her. However, Buloff's paranoia leads him to control and dominate her, tracking her every move. He questions why she didn't answer the phone, and when he doubts her explanation of sleeping, she bitterly retorts that she was expecting him to suspect something. Later, as he pours himself a drink, Buloff finds Lisa in a nightdress, and they make love.

The next day, Buloff attempts to check on Lisa again, but she leaves the phone ringing and heads out. He interrogates a young woman, Marianne Loma, mistaking her momentarily for Lisa. Under the threat of false detainment, Marianne reveals information about Ursula Stein, who picked up a package for her boyfriend, Kurt Mueller, a target of the drug ring. Lisa arrives at the police station seeking money, and Buloff obliges. When he questions her about her activities, she politely refuses, citing his jealousy and workaholic tendencies. The police attempt to reach Mueller, but Schouermann's thugs beat Ursula and kidnap her.

Buloff consults his informant at the newsstand, nicknamed "The Rabbit," who mentions tulips being connected to the drug ring but avoids sharing information about Mueller due to fear. The hitman, Max Lindt, meets with his employer Olaf and reluctantly agrees to one more hired murder—Kurt Mueller. Buloff, finding a note from Lisa under a bouquet of tulips, discovers she left a restaurant early. Mueller is killed by Lindt at a post office box, leaving behind incriminating evidence.

Buloff interrogates Lisa, accusing her of involvement with the drug ring. In response, she counters with grievances about their home life. Lisa declares her intention to have an affair, leading to Buloff hitting her. Mueller is found alive by the police, and Buloff gets a break when he finds Lindt's lucky dollar at the crime scene. Buloff identifies Lindt in lobby footage at headquarters.

Buloff investigates a red Porsche linked to Lisa and confronts Lindt's friend, Eric Scheurer, at a funfair. Buloff intercepts a call from Scheurer to Lindt, determining Lindt's location. Buloff arrests Lindt at his hotel, and during the drive, he sees Lisa getting into a red Porsche but loses her in pursuit. Buloff coerces Lindt into a plan to kill Lisa in exchange for freedom.

Lisa's friend, Irini von Klaus, owns the red Porsche, leading Buloff to intervene when he discovers Lindt's plan. Buloff apologizes to Lisa, but she scolds him for his controlling behavior. The Rabbit provides more information on the tulips, but he is killed by Schouermann's enforcers. Buloff has Lisa stay at home while Lindt still believes the job is on.

Lindt, thinking the job is still active, shows up at Lisa's house, and they engage in an affair. Buloff is relieved that Lisa is unharmed when he returns home. However, he later confronts Lindt at an abandoned factory, and Lindt shamelessly reveals the affair. Buloff forces Lindt to proceed with the plan to kill Lisa.

Buloff writes a report on Schouermann, Lindt, and his own actions but protects Lisa by omitting details. When Buloff meets Lindt in the woods, Lindt slits Buloff's throat and stabs him, declaring Buloff will pay for his actions. Lisa, unaware of Buloff's fate, calls Schouermann for another meeting.

The police are dispatched to arrest Lindt, who runs into the woods and is shot dead in retaliation. Lisa meets Schouermann, who rejects her and reveals Buloff's involvement with Lindt. The episode concludes with Lisa at the funeral, where Ostermeyer hints at Buloff's corruption but does not confirm Lisa's involvement.

== Cast ==
- John Mills as Inspector Franz Buloff
- Luciana Paluzzi as Lisa Buloff
- Robert Hoffmann as Max Lindt
- Renate Kasché as Marianne
- Tullio Altamura as Ostermeyer
- Carlo Hintermann as Mansfeld
- Enzo Fiermonte as Siegert
- Loris Bazzocchi as Kruger
- Jimmy il Fenomeno as "Rabbit"
- Vanna Polverosi as Ursula
- Rodolfo Licari as Olaf
- Bernardino Solitari as Mueller
- Carlo Spadoni as Eric
- Robert Van Daalen as Dr. Gross

== Production ==
A Black Veil for Lisa was shot in 1968 in Hamburg under the working title Vicolo cieco ("Dead end"). Film scholar Roberto Curti described the style of the film as "remarkably different" from the typical Italian gialli of the period, and closer to American and German models of the style.

== Release ==
A Black Veil for Lisa was released in Italy in September 1968. was shown in Germany as Das Geheimnis der jungen Witwe (translation: Mystery of the Young Widow). in this country, it was promoted as Edgar Wallace-style krimi.

In the United States, distributor Commonwealth United re-edited the film from 95 minutes to 88 minutes, while replacing most of the original score with new music by Richard Markowitz.

It was also released as Showdown.

== Reception ==
From contemporary reviews, "Whit." of Variety described the film as an "okay programmer" and that "Massimo Dallamano's direction [...] is as sturdy as script, on which he also collabed, will permit, and color camera work by Angelo Lotti is particularly effective."

== Home media ==
The 88-minute U.S. cut was released on Blu-ray by Olive Films in October 2015.
