= Gian Franco Reverberi =

Italian composer and musician (1934–2024)

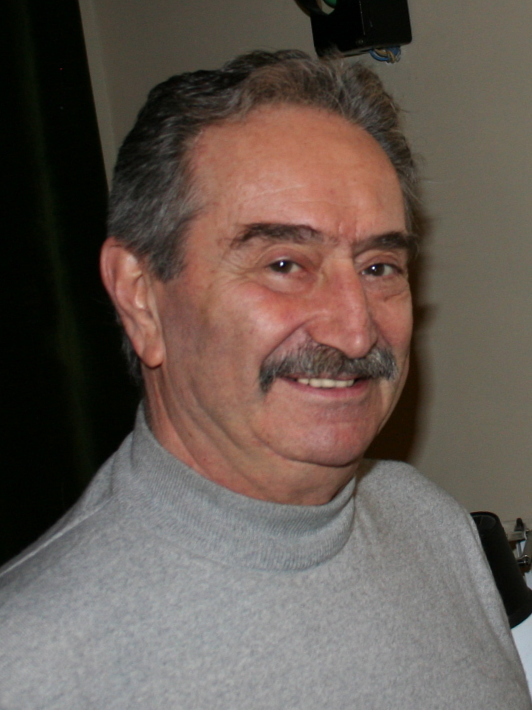
- Reverberi in 2008
- Born: 12 December 1934; Genoa, Kingdom of Italy
- Died: 8 January 2024 (aged 89); Genoa, Italy
- Occupations: Composer, musician
- Relatives: Gian Piero Reverberi (brother)

Gian Franco Reverberi (Italian pronunciation: [dʒaɱ ˈfraŋko reˈvɛrberi]; 12 December 1934 – 8 January 2024) was an Italian composer and musician. He worked mainly on the soundtracks for Spaghetti Westerns.

Reverberi was one of the first Italian rock music artists. He also worked with his brother Gian Piero on the song "Last Men Standing" (or "Il carico d'oro ") from the 1968 soundtrack of Django, Prepare a Coffin (Preparati la bara!) (one of many unofficial sequels to Django), which was sampled in Gnarls Barkley's hit "Crazy". Both brothers are listed as writers of the song.

Among his other credited film scores are Soldati e capelloni (1967), A Black Veil for Lisa (1968), Chimera (1968), ¡Viva América! (1969), Venus in Furs (1969), La ragazza del prete (1970), Black Turin (1972), Black Magic Rites (1973) and A Policewoman on the Porno Squad (1979). He also worked with Enzo Jannacci and Giorgio Gaber.

Reverberi died in Genoa on 8 January 2024, three weeks after his 89th birthday.
