= Uta Levka =

German actress (born 1942)

- Born: 26 May 1942 (age 84); Cottbus, Germany
- Occupation: Actress
- Years active: 1964–1971

Uta Levka (born 26 May 1942) is a former German film and television actress active during the 1960s and early 1970s. She was discovered by the actress Maria Schell while working at the Bavaria Studios in Munich and appeared in a succession of glamorous roles. She appeared in three of the popular Edgar Wallace adaptations of Rialto Film. She played the lead in the 1967 film Carmen, Baby.

== Selected filmography ==
- Girls Behind Bars (1965)
- The Sinister Monk (1965)
- The Hunchback of Soho (1966)
- Black Market of Love (1966)
- The Alley Cats (1966)
- Carmen, Baby (1967)
- Operation St. Peter's (1967)
- The Hound of Blackwood Castle (1968)
- Jet Generation (1968)
- De Sade (1969)
- The Oblong Box (1969)
- Scream and Scream Again (1970)

== Bibliography ==
- Cowie, Peter; Elley, Derek, eds. (1977). World Filmography: 1967. London: Tantivy Press. ISBN 978-0-498-01565-6.
