= Tabu: A Story of the South Seas =

1931 film

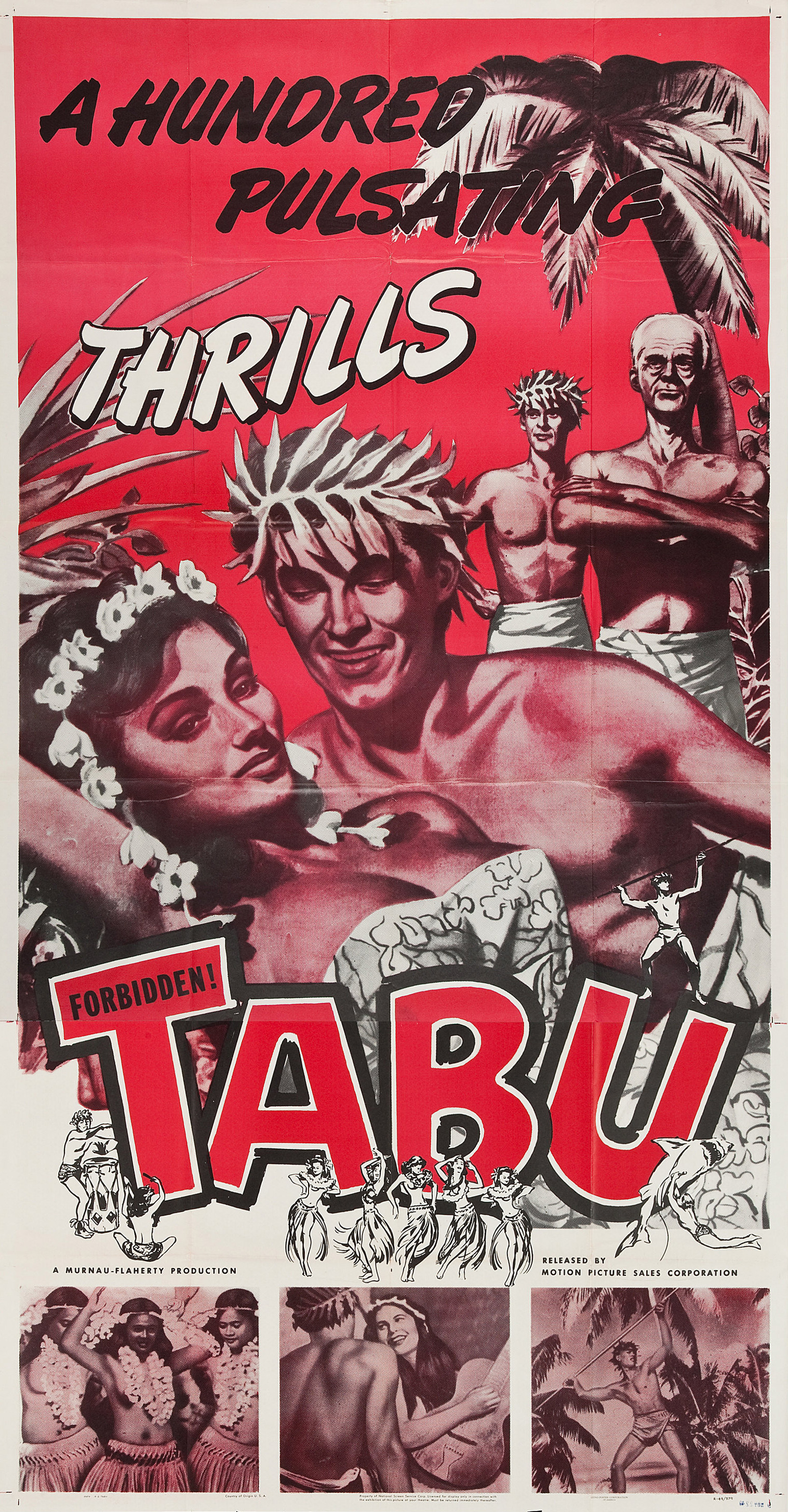
- Poster for 1949 U.S. theatrical re-release
- Directed by: F. W. Murnau
- Written by: F. W. Murnau; Robert J. Flaherty
- Produced by: David Flaherty; Robert J. Flaherty; F. W. Murnau
- Starring: Matahi; Anne Chevalier; Bill Brambridge
- Cinematography: Floyd Crosby
- Edited by: Arthur A. Brooks
- Music by: Hugo Riesenfeld
- Production company: Flaherty-Murnau Productions
- Distributed by: Paramount Pictures
- Release date: March 18, 1931
- Running time: 84 minutes
- Country: United States
- Languages: Sound (Synchronized); English Intertitles
- Budget: $150,000
- Box office: $472,000

Tabu: A Story of the South Seas (pronounced [ˈtapu]) is a 1931 American synchronized sound film directed by F. W. Murnau. While the film has no audible dialog, it was released with a synchronized musical score with sound effects using the Western Electric Sound System sound-on-film process. A docufiction, it is split into two chapters: The first, called "Paradise", depicts the lives of two lovers on a South Seas island until they are forced to escape the island when the girl is chosen as a holy maid to the gods. The second chapter, "Paradise Lost", depicts the couple's life on a colonised island and how they adapt to and are exploited by Western civilisation. The title comes from the Polynesian concept of tapu (spelled tabu in Tongan before 1943), from which is derived the English word "taboo".

The story was written by Robert J. Flaherty and Murnau; with the exception of the opening scene, the film was directed solely by Murnau. This was his last film; he died in a hospital after an automobile accident on March 11, 1931, a week before the film's premiere in New York City.

Cinematographer Floyd Crosby won an Academy Award for Best Cinematography for his work. In 1994, Tabu: A Story of the South Seas was selected for preservation in the United States National Film Registry by the Library of Congress as being "culturally, historically, or aesthetically significant".

== Plot ==
Aged emissary Hitu arrives by Western sailing ship to the island of Bora Bora, a small island in the South Pacific, on an important mission. He bears a message from the chief of Fanuma to the chief of Bora Bora: a maiden sacred to their gods has died and Reri has been given the great honour of replacing her because of her royal blood and virtue. From this point on, she is tabu: "man must not touch her or cast upon her the eye of desire" upon penalty of death. This is painful news to Reri and the young man Matahi, who love each other. Matahi cannot bear it. That night, he sneaks her off the ship, and the couple escape the island by outrigger canoe.

Eventually, they reach a French colony, half dead. They recover quickly, and Matahi becomes the community's most successful pearl diver. They are happy with their new life together. However, Matahi is unfamiliar with the concept of money, so he does not understand the bills and signs for drinks for everyone during a celebration.

The local policeman receives a notice from the French government announcing a reward for the return of the couple, but Matahi bribes him with his last pearl. Then, Hitu arrives on the island and sees Reri alone, informing her that she has three days to give herself up or Matahi will be put to death. Without telling Matahi of her meeting with Hitu, Reri decides they must flee once more. However, when Matahi goes to buy tickets on a schooner, the shopkeepers instead take the money as partial payment of his debt.

That night, Hitu returns with a spear. Reri first throws herself in front of the sleeping Matahi, then agrees to return to Bora Bora to save his life. When Matahi stirs, Reri pretends to be asleep. Matahi gets up and decides to get money by getting a pearl from a tabu region of the lagoon, a perilous place guarded by a shark that has already taken the life of one diver. While he is away, Reri writes a farewell note, and leaves with Hitu. Matahi manages to get a pearl while fending off the shark. When he returns, however, he finds the note. He swims after Hitu's boat. He manages to grab a rope trailing from the boat, unbeknownst to the sleeping Reri, but Hitu cuts it. Undaunted, Matahi continues swimming after them until he eventually tires and drowns.

== Cast ==
According to an intertitle at the beginning, "only native-born South Sea islanders appear in this picture with a few half-castes and Chinese".

- Matahi as The Boy
- Anne Chevalier as The Girl (as Reri)
- Bill Bambridge as The Policeman (as Jean)
- Hitu as The Old Warrior

== Production ==
=== Pre-production ===
Murnau was coming off two troubled Fox Studios productions, Four Devils (1928) and City Girl (1930), while Flaherty's Native American documentary Acoma the Sky City had been shut down. The two directors knew each other through Flaherty's brother David, and Murnau expressed a desire to make a film in Tahiti with Flaherty who had experience with the natives there. Murnau and Flaherty wrote a story called Turia and started their own production company, Flaherty-Murnau Productions. Turia was based on a legend Flaherty had heard while working on W. S. Van Dyke's White Shadows in the South Seas (1928) and contained many elements which would later evolve into Tabu: A Story of the South Seas.

Murnau visited Tahiti in May 1929 and was joined by Flaherty a month later to scout for locations on the nearby island of Bora Bora. While scouting, they found their leading lady, Anne Chevalier, in a local cocktail bar.

The production was originally supposed to be financed by a small production company called Colorart. By September, however, Murnau had only received $5,000 of the due money. After a series of telegrams asking for the rest of the money, Murnau got fed up and decided to fund it himself.

To cut costs, Murnau sent the Hollywood crew home and trained the natives to work as the crew. He also scrapped plans to shoot the film in colour and changed to black and white. The film's script was rewritten and the title was changed to Tabu: A Story of the South Seas to avoid potential legal issues with Colorart. This was the start of a poor working relationship between Flaherty and Murnau. Flaherty disliked the new script, feeling it was overly plotted and Westernized.

=== Production ===
Production began in January 1930, with Flaherty directing the opening scene of the film. This would be the only scene he directed. Flaherty began having technical problems, as his camera was causing the film to rip. He called in cinematographer Floyd Crosby for help and the rest of the film was shot by Crosby. Murnau, Flaherty, and Crosby were the only professional filmmakers working on Tabu: A Story of the South Seas; the rest of the crew was made up of local natives. Flaherty worked on the story with Murnau during production, but he was not the co-director as he originally thought he would be. He spent most of his time on the film working in the lab developing the film. Flaherty disliked Murnau immensely because of this and the arrogance and selfishness Murnau displayed during production.

=== Post-production ===
Production finished in October 1930. Flaherty had been living on only $40 a week and was broke by the end of the shoot. A couple of days after the wrap, Flaherty sold his share of the film to Murnau for $25,000. Returning to Los Angeles, Murnau spent the winter editing the film and used the last of his money to hire Hugo Riesenfeld for the music scoring. The distribution rights were sold to Paramount for five years for a sum of $75,000, which helped Murnau pay off Flaherty. He died in a car crash shortly before the film's premiere.

== Release and reception ==
The film had its premiere on March 18, 1931, a week after Murnau died, at New York's Central Park Theater. The film was not a box-office success upon release, grossing just $472,000 worldwide, which failed to recoup Murnau and Paramount's investment. At the 4th Academy Awards Floyd Crosby was awarded the Oscar for Best Cinematography.

The film is recognized by American Film Institute in these lists:

- 2002: AFI's 100 Years...100 Passions – Nominated

== Preservation status and restoration ==
The film's ownership reverted to Murnau's mother Ottilie Plumpe after distribution rights lapsed in the mid-1930s. The original negative was returned to Germany, where it was destroyed during World War II.

In 1940, Plumpe sold the worldwide distribution rights to Rowland and Samuel Brown. During World War II, the US government seized the film, believing it was owned by German citizens. The Brown brothers regained the film after the war and re-released the film in 1948, adding an alternate title sequence and cutting five minutes out of the film including content then deemed objectionable by the Production Code.

The re-release was not a success and in the 1960s Murnau's nieces, Ursula Plumpe and Eva Diekmann, bought back the rights. In 1973, a complete nitrate print of the 1931 release was discovered and screened at the American Film Institute. Floyd Crosby funded a preservation negative by the UCLA Film and Television Archive based on this print, to preserve the film for future generations.

== Home media ==
Tabu was released on region 1 DVD by Image Entertainment. This version runs 80 minutes 51 seconds. The disc also includes a commentary by film historian Janet Bergstrom; twenty minutes of outtakes; and a short film called Reri in New York.

Masters of Cinema released a Region 0 DVD in the UK and Ireland. This version of the film runs 82 minutes 14 seconds with PAL speed up (85 minutes 42 seconds (NTSC)). This version re-instates the footage cut by Paramount prior to the film's premiere, including shots of nudity. The DVD contains a commentary with R. Dixon Smith and Brad Stevens, as well as a booklet containing essays and the original stories Turia and Tabu by Flaherty and Murnau upon which the film is based.

It was restored for Blu-ray release in the UK as part of the Eureka Masters of Cinema Series (Spine No 61) and issued in June 2013. Included is a longer version than the Paramount 1931 release; an extensive 56-page booklet; a short program on Murnau's films; extensive clapperboard footage that has survived; and a short made at the time for UFA/Tobis release, Treibjagd in der Südsee (“Drift Hunting in the South Sea”).

== See also ==
- Docufiction
- List of docufiction films
