= Anne Chevalier =

American actress

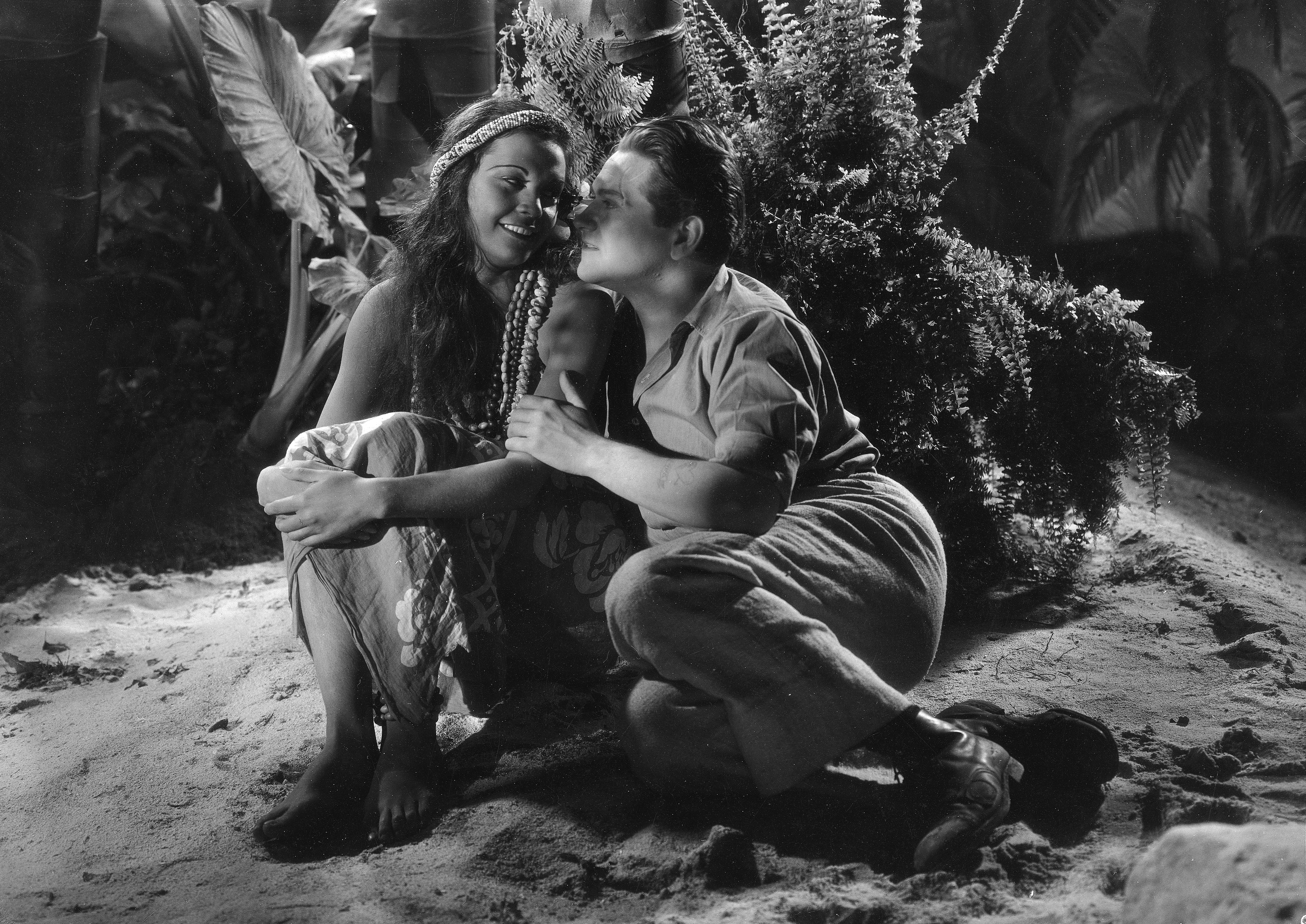
- Reri as Moana and Eugeniusz Bodo as Stefan in a scene of Black Pearl
- Born: 1912
- Died: 1977 (aged 64–65)
- Occupations: Actress; dancer; singer

Anne Chevalier (also known as Reri; 1912–1977) was a French-Tahitanian actress, singer and dancer.

== Early life ==
Anna Irma Ruahrei Chevalier, born in 1912, was the seventh child to a Frenchman Laurence Chevalier and his Polynesian wife. She received education from a Catholic girls' school at Papeete. At age 16, Chevalier was spotted by German director F.W. Murnau who was looking for a Polynesian girl to play the lead role in his silent film Tabu: A Story of the South Seas (1931), whose story revolved around the fate of a couple when the young girl Reri is to be offered as a sacred maiden to Gods.Tabu has been lauded as "one of the last of the great silent films". Chevalier went to the United States for promoting the film and spent nearly a year there, appearing in the 1931 Broadway show of Ziegfeld Follies and visiting several Hollywood studios. From there, she went to Europe for Tabu's premiere in Berlin and also performed at dance shows in Paris and Warsaw.

Chevalier's second film role was opposite Eugeniusz Bodo in the Polish romantic drama Black Pearl (1934). She played a Tahitian woman who marries a Polish sailor and becomes a dancing sensation in her quest to gain acceptance by her husband's society. Ohio's state censor banned the film, citing their policy against interracial marriage. Three years later, she made a brief appearance in John Ford's The Hurricane, another film set in the South Seas.

== Personal life ==
During her stay in Europe, Chevalier was romantically involved with her Black Pearl co-star Eugeniusz Bodo. Polish media even referred to her as his wife, but the couple soon separated and Chevalier returned to Tahiti. She died there in 1977.

== Filmography ==
- Tabu: A Story of the South Seas (1931)
- Black Pearl (1934)
- The Hurricane (1937)
