= Massimo Dallamano =

Italian director, cinematographer and screenwriter (1917–1976)

- Born: 17 April 1917; Milan, Lombardy, Italy
- Died: 4 November 1976 (aged 59); Rome, Lazio, Italy
- Other names: Max Dillman; Max Dillmann; Jack Dalmas
- Occupation(s): Film director, cinematographer, screenwriter

Massimo Dallamano (17 April 1917 – 4 November 1976) was an Italian cinematographer, film director, and screenwriter. He is best known for his work on Sergio Leone's Dollars Trilogy, and for directing several giallo and poliziotteschi films during the 1970s.

== Life and career ==
Born in Milan, Dallamano began in the 1940s as cameraman for documentaries and commercials, and after the war he became a cinematographer, specializing in adventure films.

In 1959, he co-directed the travel documentary Tierra mágica, which was nominated for the Golden Bear at the 9th Berlin International Film Festival. He was also active in Spanish cinema. He shot Francisco Rovira Beleta's film Los Tarantos, which was nominated for Best Foreign-Language Film at the 36th Academy Awards.

His best known work as a cinematographer were Sergio Leone's landmark Spaghetti Westerns A Fistful of Dollars (1964) and For a Few Dollars More (1965). Christopher Frayling notes Dallamano's contributions to those films' distinctive visual style, including the use of widescreen compositions and Renaissance-style lighting effects in close-ups.

In 1967, he made his narrative film directorial debut with another Spaghetti Western, Bandidos. He went on to direct a dozen more films, including poliziotteschi, giallo, horror, and erotic films. His films include A Black Veil for Lisa (1968) with Luciana Paluzzi and John Mills, Dorian Gray (1970) with Helmut Berger, What Have You Done to Solange? (1972), What Have They Done to Your Daughters? (1974), and The Cursed Medallion (1975).

Throughout his career, Dallamano was sometimes credited under the aliases Max Dillman (also spelled Dillmann) and Jack Dalmas.

== Death ==
Dallamano died at age 59 in a car accident, several months after the release of his film Colt 38 Special Squad (1976). His next film was intended to be Red Rings of Fear, which was ultimately directed by Alberto Negrin. Dallamano retained a posthumous screenwriting credit.

== Select filmography ==
Title	Year	Credited as			Notes	Ref(s)
Title	Year	Director	Screenwriter	Cinematographer	Notes	Ref(s)
Herod the Great	1959			Yes		
The Cossacks	1960			Yes		
Love and Larceny	1960			Yes		
Constantine and the Cross	1961			Yes		
Queen of the Nile	1961			Yes		
Pontius Pilate	1962			Yes		
Gunfight at Red Sands	1963			Yes		
Los Tarantos	1963			Yes		
A Fistful of Dollars	1964			Yes		
Bullets Don't Argue	1964			Yes		
For a Few Dollars More	1965			Yes		
The Mona Lisa Has Been Stolen	1966			Yes		
Bandidos	1967	Yes		Yes		
A Black Veil for Lisa	1968	Yes				
Venus in Furs	1969	Yes				
Dorian Gray	1970	Yes	Yes			
What Have You Done to Solange?	1972	Yes	Yes			
Super Bitch	1973	Yes	Yes			
What Have They Done to Your Daughters?	1974	Yes	Yes			
The Cursed Medallion	1975	Yes				
Colt 38 Special Squad	1976	Yes	Yes			
Red Rings of Fear	1978		Yes		Posthumous release	

== Sources ==
=== References ===
- Kinnard, Roy; Crnkovich, Tony (2017). Italian Sword and Sandal Films, 1908-1990. McFarland. ISBN 978-1476662916.
- Curti, Roberto (2013). Italian Crime Filmography, 1968-1980. McFarland. ISBN 978-0786469765.
- Curti, Roberto (2016). Tonino Valerii: The Films. McFarland. ISBN 978-1476626185.
- Curti, Roberto (2017). Italian Gothic Horror Films, 1970-1979. McFarland. ISBN 978-1476629605.
- Curti, Roberto (2022). Italian Giallo in Film and Television. McFarland. ISBN 978-1-4766-8248-8.
- Grant, Kevin (2011). Any Gun Can Play. Fab Press. ISBN 9781903254615.
