= Soft Shoulders, Sharp Curves =

1972 film

- Poster
- Directed by: Gabriel Axel; Richard R. Rimmel
- Written by: Reinhold Brandes
- Cinematography: Richard R. Rimmel
- Music by: Gerhard Heinz
- Distributed by: Contifilm
- Release date: 28 January 1972
- Running time: 88
- Country: West Germany
- Language: German

Soft Shoulders, Sharp Curves (German: Die Auto-Nummer – Sex auf Rädern) is an erotic, comedy film directed by Gabriel Axel and Richard R. Rimmel, and released in 1972.

== Cast ==
In alphabetical order

- Doris Arden
- Alla Beate
- Maud Maria Bluemel
- Rolf Eden
- Carl Heinz Eismann
- Sylvia Falk
- Walter Feuchtenberg
- Christian Fredersdorf
- Friedrich Karl Grund
- Fernando Gómez
- Joachim Hackethal
- Katharina Herberg
- Claudia Höll
- Michel Jacot
- Ulla Kopa
- Helge T. Larisch
- Hansi Lohmann
- Alexander Miller
- Gernot Möhner
- Peter Mühlen
- Felicitas Peters
- Karl-Heinz Peters
- Franz Schafheitlin
- Reinhold Scholtz
- Barbara Scott
- Ingeborg Steinbach
- Mogens von Gadow
- Michael von Harbach
- Karin Waas
- Margit Weinert
