= Claus Tinney =

German actor, screenwriter and film director

- Born: 1932 (age 93–94); East Prussia, Germany
- Occupations: Actor, writer, director
- Years active: 1966–2004 (film & TV)

Claus Tinney (born 1932 in Nidden) is a German actor, screenwriter and film director.

== Selected filmography ==
- Two Among Millions (1961)
- Black Market of Love (1966)
- Hot Pavements of Cologne (1967)
- The Doctor of St. Pauli (1968)
- Death and Diamonds (1968)
- Housewives on the Job (1972)
- The Disciplined Woman (1972)
- Nurse Report (1972)

== Bibliography ==
- Peter Cowie & Derek Elley. World Filmography: 1967. Fairleigh Dickinson University Press, 1977.
