= Lawrence A. Bowes =

American actor (1885–1955)

Lawrence A. Bowes (January 1, 1885 – June 5, 1955) was an American actor. He appeared in 22 films between 1915 and 1921.He was born in Newark, California, United States and died in Glendale, California.
