= Doris Arden =

German actress

- Born: 1946; Trostberg, Bavaria, Germany
- Died: before 2013
- Occupation: Actress
- Years active: 1967–1985 (film and television)

Doris Arden (born 1946, date of death unknown) was a German film and television actress. She also did a number of shoots as a glamour model. Arden is deceased.

== Selected filmography ==
- Carmen, Baby (1967)
- Hot Pavements of Cologne (1967)
- So Much Naked Tenderness (1968)
- Soft Shoulders, Sharp Curves (1972)
- Nurse Report (1972)

== Bibliography ==
- Peter Cowie & Derek Elley. World Filmography: 1967. Fairleigh Dickinson University Press, 1977.
