= Frank Valdor =

German bandleader

Frank Valdor (27 May 1937 – 5 August 2013) was one of the great German bandleaders having sold over 2.5 million records during the 1960s and 1970s. In particular, Valdor was popular for his instrumental arrangements intended to be played non-stop at parties. He has been called "King of Dynamic Party Sound". His discography consists of more than 80 LP's, 10 singles and 8 CD's. Valdor's record covers often have a "genius" graphical touch, where he is shown surrounded by scantily dressed women. His album King Size sold 25,000 copies in Finland and was awarded gold status.

Like James Last did Frank Valdor had also a period during the earlier 1970s, when he was a celebrated musician in Scandinavia. Mainly, but not exclusively, for those who at the time were older than 30 years old.

== Discography (Vinyl LP's only) ==
In alphabetical order, in this case is "Somerset" a record producer

- 16 Fantastic Golden Latin Hits 1978
- A gogo Discofoon * 7067
- Aktuell Somerset 718
- Big Band Hits – German Jukebok EP, Hippo 21001 *
- Classics for dancing Europa E 193
- Coctails for two Hippo 31003
- Dancing a la diskothek – Constanze
- Dancing and Dreaming – German Jukebox EP Hippo 21003 *
- Dancing at midnight – Hippo 41009
- Das große Stimmung Album – Philips H 72 AM 231
- Dreamy Violins – German Jukebox EP Hippo 24008 *
- Dynamic Man Somerset 740/741
- Dynamic Trumpet Party Somerset 734
- Fiesta Tijuana Somerset 665
- Frank Valdor Somerset, published 1973
- Frank Valdor’s tropic beat – Popular 21165
- Glenn Miller Story – German Jukebox EP Hippo 25010 *
- Goes Western Somerset 731
- Gogo Guitars Somerset 677
- Golden Memories – German Jukebox EP Hot-Six 605 **
- Goodtime Girls
- Great Latin Hits BASF BB22862-2
- Gute Laune a gogo – Happy Trumpet Party – Telefunken NT 276
- Hammond Hitparade Somerset 669
- Happy Rosamunde Somerset 715
- Happy Sax – German Jukebox EP Somerset AP-014 *
- Happy Saxophon a go go Somerset 674
- Happy Trumpet Party 2 – Telefunken
- Happy Trumpets – German Jukebox EP Somerset AP-016 *
- Hawaii Beach Party GrandPrix GP-10033
- Heute hau'n wir auf die Pauke Somerset 759
- Hey Mister Valdor! Somerset 760
- Hits a gogo Somerset 659
- Hits am laufenden Band RCA PPL 1-4167
- Hot Nights in Rio RCA PL 28305
- Im Popschrittmarsch Sonic 9091
- In Mexico Somerset 712
- Jede Menge Hits Somerset 661
- King of Dynamic Party Sound Somerset 716/717
- King Size 2 Somerset 773
- King Size Somerset 739
- La Montanara Somerset 787
- Live in Rio Somerset 746
- Mexican Beat Hippo 41005 ***
- Mexican Fiesta Grand Prix 10041
- Music for television, films and radio Europhon ELP 530
- Music für Verliebte Hippo 41009
- My Favourite Songs Somerset 780
- Non Stop Musical – German Jukebox EP Somerset AP-015 *
- Non-Stop Musicals Somerset 663
- Polka, Polka, Polka – mit der Schützenliesel Somerset 788
- Pop no Stomp – Constanze Somerset G 688
- Pop non stop Somerset 688
- Presents the Good Time Girls Somerset 769
- Remembering Glenn Miller – German Jukebox EP Hippo 22.004 *
- Rock Festival Somerset 783
- Rubber Boat Party Somerset 748
- Rythmus Ã gogo Somerset 698
- Scandinavian Party Somerset 764
- Schlager von Gestern im Rythmus von Heute Somerset 775
- Starportrait Somerset 766, 767
- Stereo, 28 trumpet hits Discofoon* 7507 131
- String of pearls Hippo 41004
- Surprise-partie 2 – Trianon c046-11396
- Swing And Sweet – German Jukebok EP Hippo 23006 *
- Tanz bis zum Umfallen Philips 88528DY
- Tanzparty a gogo – Hippo 31Â 004
- Tanzparty bei Frankie Europa E 184
- Trompeten Ã gogo 2 Somerset 742
- Trompeten Ã gogo Somerset 660
- Tropical Dancing RCA PPL1-4218
- Tropical evergreens – Bellaphone
- Tropicana – Center 17 023 ST
- Trumpets for Dancing Somerset 680
- Udo Jürgens Hits for dancing Somerset 699
- Unter südlicher Sonne Somerset 723
- Viva Mexico (Frank Valdor’s Tropic Beats), Grammoclub Ex Libris EL 12 013, Schweiz, LP 1965/1966
- Volkslieder aus aller Welt – Europa E 187
- Weekend party – Decca SLK 16Â 364
- Weekend Party Decca SLK 16 364-P
- Wir machen durch… Somerset 778
- Wodka á Gogo Somerset 691
- Wonderful World of Trumpets RCA PPL2-4084
- Wünscht Frohe Weihnacht RCA PPL1-4060
