= Carmen (novella) =

1845 novella by Prosper Mérimée

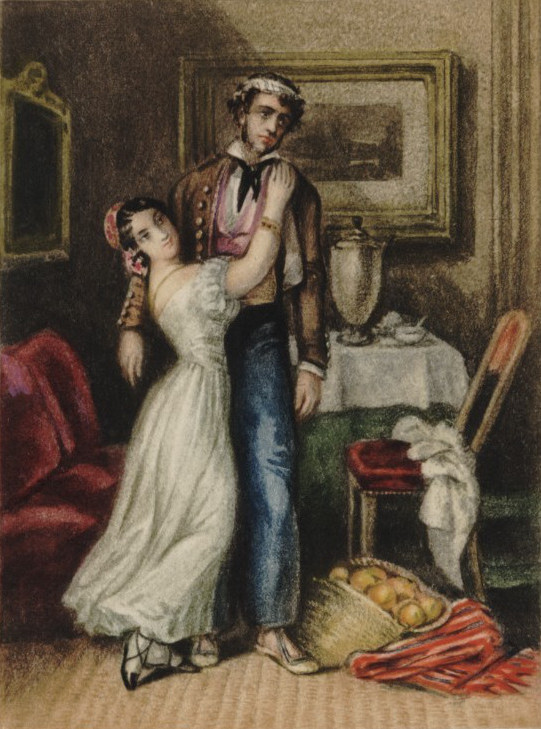
- Mérimée's own watercolor Carmen
- Author: Prosper Mérimée
- Language: French
- Genre: Novella
- Set in: Andalusia (Spain), 1830
- Publisher: Revue des deux Mondes (periodical, first three parts), Michel Lévy (book, full version)
- Publication date: 1845 (periodical), 1846 (book)
- Publication place: France
- OCLC: 7788215363
- Dewey Decimal: 843.7
- LC Class: PQ2362.C3 E5
- Text: Carmen at Wikisource

Carmen is a novella by Prosper Mérimée, written and first published in 1845. It has been adapted into a number of dramatic works, including the famous opera of the same name by Georges Bizet.

== Sources ==
According to a letter Mérimée wrote to the Countess of Montijo, (Note: The Countess's daughter would become the Empress Eugénie.) Carmen was inspired by a story she told him on his visit to Spain in 1830. He said, "It was about that ruffian from Málaga who had killed his mistress, who consecrated herself exclusively to the public. ... As I have been studying the Gypsies for some time, I have made my heroine a Gypsy." (Note: "Il s'agissait de ce jaque de Malaga qui avait tué sa maîtresse, laquelle se consacrait exclusivement au public. ... Comme j'étudie les bohémiens depuis quelque temps, j'ai fait mon heroïne bohémienne.")

An important source for the material on the Romani people (Gypsies, Gitanos) was George Borrow's book The Zincali (1841). Another source may have been the narrative poem The Gypsies (1824) by Alexander Pushkin, which Mérimée would later translate into French prose.

== Synopsis ==
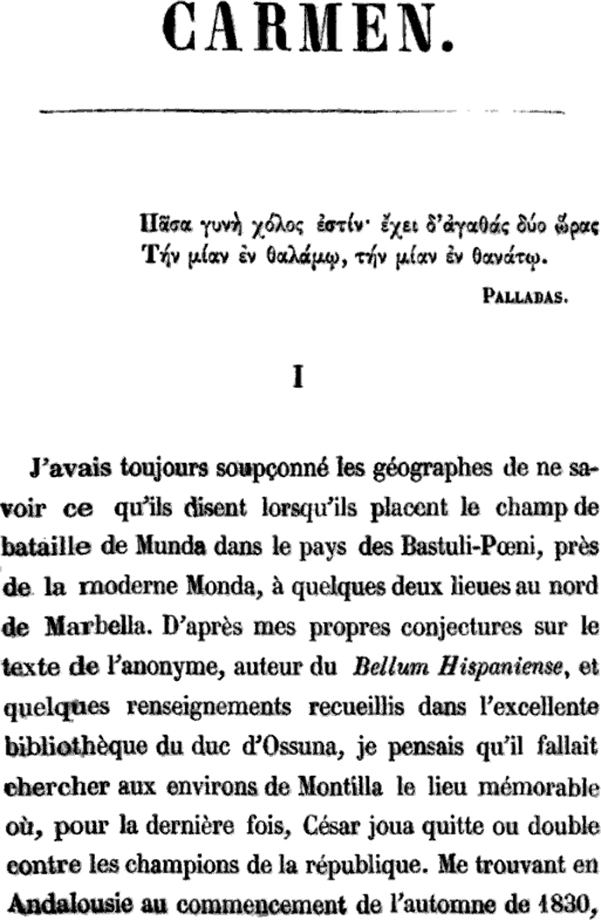
Opening page of the original book

The novella comprises four parts. Only the first three appeared in the original publication in the October 1, 1845, issue of the Revue des deux Mondes (Review of the Two Worlds); the fourth first appeared in the book publication in 1846. Mérimée tells the story as if it had really happened to him on his trip to Spain in 1830.

Part I

The work is prefaced by an untranslated quotation from the poet Palladas:

Πᾶσα γυνὴ χόλος ἐστίν· ἔχει δ᾽ δύω ὥρας, τὴν μίαν ἐν θαλάμῳ, τὴν μίαν ἐν θανάτῳ. (Every woman turns sour/Twice she has her hour/One is in bed/The other is dead).

For readers of Ancient Greek, this set the theme of the tale: a ferocious woman, sex, and death.

While searching for the site of the Battle of Munda in a lonely spot in Andalusia, the author meets a man whom his guide hints is a dangerous robber. Instead of fleeing, the author befriends the man by sharing cigars and food. They stay in the same primitive inn that night. The guide tells the author that the man is the robber known as Don José Navarro and leaves to turn him in, but the author warns Don José, who escapes.

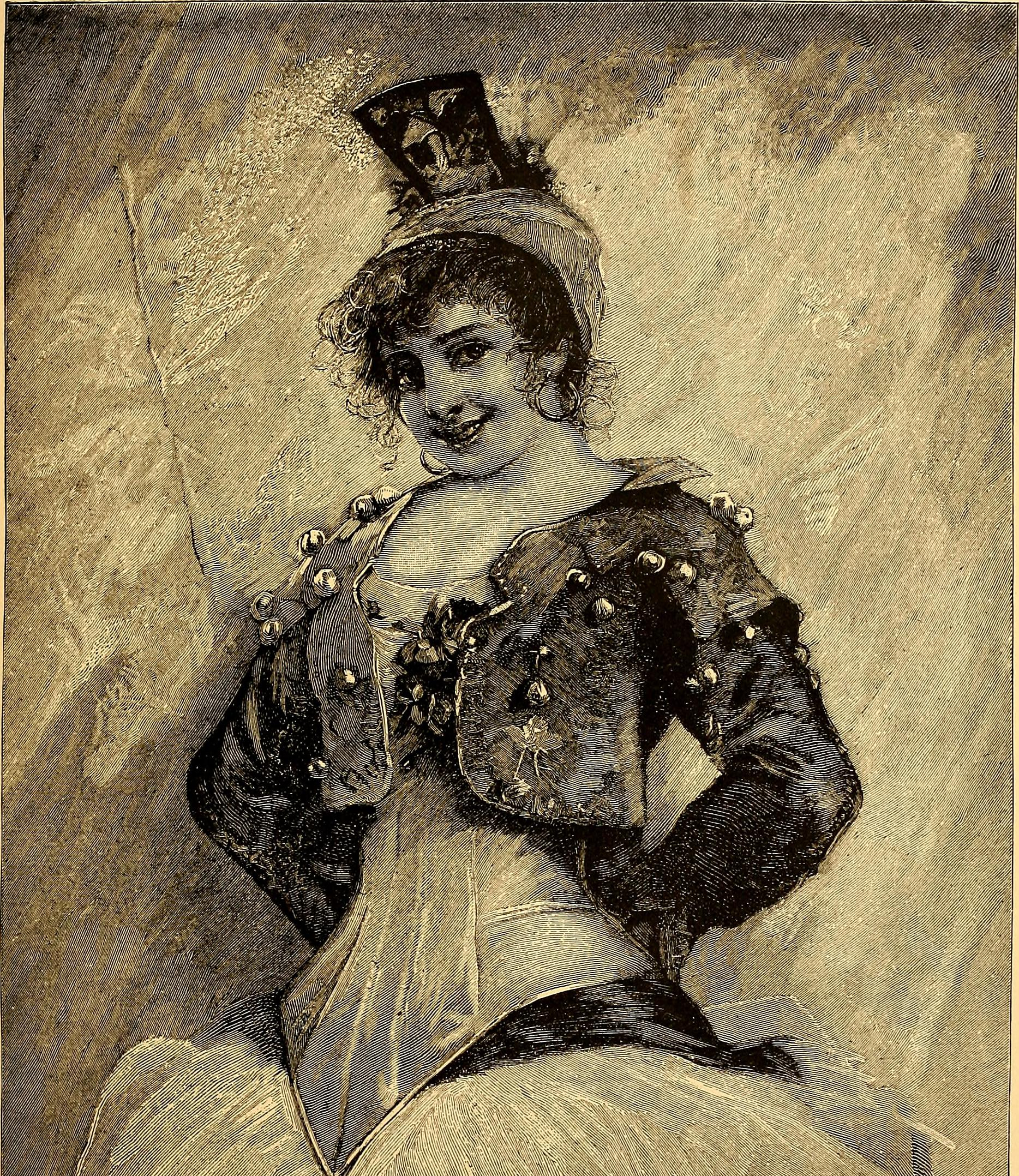
Illustration of Carmen (József Árpád Koppay, 1891)

Part II

Later, in Córdoba, the author meets Carmen, a beautiful Gitano (Romani) woman who is fascinated by his repeating watch. He goes to her home so she can tell his fortune, and she impresses him with her occult knowledge. They are interrupted by Don José, and although Carmen makes throat-cutting gestures, José escorts the author out. The author finds his watch is missing.

Some months later, again in Córdoba, a friend of the author's tells him that Don José Navarro is to be garrotted the next day. The author visits the prisoner and hears the story of his life.

Part III

The robber's real name is José Lizarrabengoa, and he is a Basque hidalgo from Navarre. He killed a man in a fight resulting from a game of paume (presumably some form of Basque pelota) and then fled. In Seville he joined a unit of dragoons, soldiers with police functions.

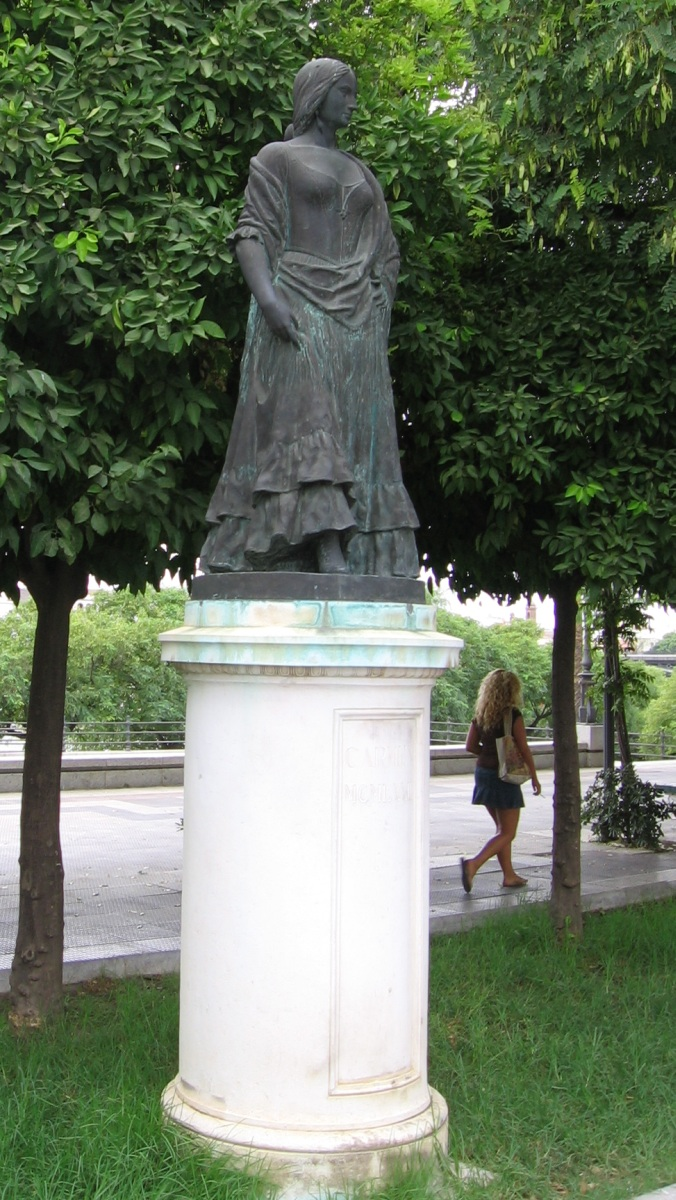
Statue of Carmen on the Paseo Alcalde Marqués de Contadero, Seville

One day he met Carmen, then working in the cigar factory he was guarding. As he alone in his unit ignored her, she teased him. A few hours later, he arrested her for cutting "x"s in a co-worker's face in a quarrel. She convinced him by speaking Basque that she was half Basque, and he let her go, for which he was imprisoned for a month and demoted. After his release, he encountered her again and she repaid him with a day of bliss, followed by another when he allowed her fellow smugglers to pass his post. He looked for her at the house of one of her Romani friends, but she entered with his lieutenant. In the ensuing fight, José killed the lieutenant. He fled to Carmen's outlaw band.

With the outlaws, he progressed from smuggling to robbery. He was sometimes with Carmen but suffered from jealousy as she used her attractions to further the band's enterprises; he also learned that she was married. After her husband joined the band, José provoked a knife fight with him and killed him. Carmen became José's wife. However, she told him she loved him less than before, and she became attracted to a successful young picador named Lucas. Mad with jealousy, José begged her to forsake other men and live with him; they could start an honest life in America. She said that she knew from omens that he was fated to kill her, but "Carmen will always be free," (Note: "Carmen sera toujours libre.") and as she now hated herself for having loved him, she would never give in to him. He stabbed her to death and then turned himself in to authorities. Don José ends his tale by saying that the Romani are to blame for the way they raised Carmen.

Part IV

This part consists of scholarly remarks on the Romani: their appearance, their customs, their conjectured history, and their language. According to Henri Martineau, editor of a collection of Mérimée's fiction, the etymologies at the end are "extremely suspect".

== Differences from Bizet's opera ==
The opera is based on Part III of the story and omits many elements, such as Carmen's husband. It greatly increases the role of other characters, such as the Dancaïre, (Note: Dancaire, an obsolete Germanía word for someone who gambles on someone else's behalf with that person's money—Dancaire in El delincuente español. El lenguaje : (estudio filológico, psicológico y sociológico) : con dos vocabularios jergales by Rafael Salillas.) who is only a minor character in the story; the Remendado, (Note: Man wearing patched clothes) who one page after he is introduced is wounded by soldiers and then shot by Carmen's husband to keep him from slowing the gang down; and Lucas (renamed Escamillo and promoted to matador), who is seen only in the bull ring in the story. The opera's female singing roles other than Carmen—Micaëla, Frasquita, and Mercédès—have no counterparts in the novella.

== See also ==
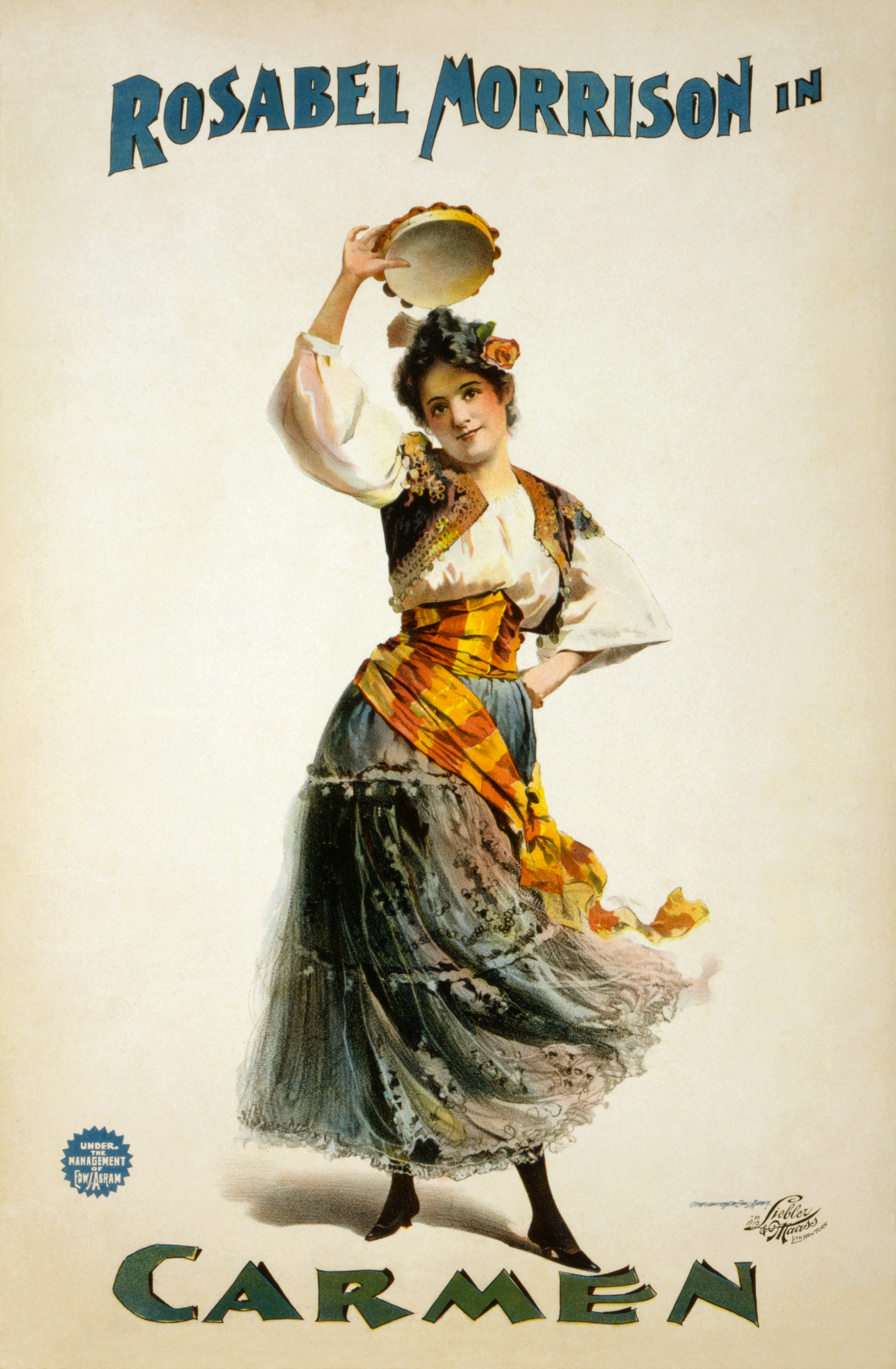
Rosabel Morrison's company toured with Theodore Kremer's dramatic adaptation of the novella (1896)

Other adaptations of the novella include the following:

- Carmen (1913 film)
- Carmen (1915 Cecil B. DeMille film)
- Carmen (1915 Raoul Walsh film)
- A Burlesque on Carmen (1915 film)
- Carmen (1918 film)
- Carmen (1926 film)
- Carmen (1931 film)
- Carmen (1942 film)
- Carmen (1943 film)
- Carmen (1953 film)
- Carmen Jones (1943 musical)
- Carmen Jones (1954 film)
- The Loves of Carmen (1927 film)
- The Loves of Carmen (1948 film)
- Carmen, Baby, 1967 film
- La Tragédie de Carmen, a 1983 film by Peter Brook
- Prénom Carmen, a 1983 film by Jean-Luc Godard
- Carmen, a 1983 film by Carlos Saura
- Carmen: A Hip Hopera (2001 film)
- Karmen Geï, a 2001 adaptation set in Senegal
- Carmen (2003 film)
- U-Carmen eKhayelitsha, a 2005 adaptation set in South Africa in the Khayelitsha district of Cape Town
- Carmen, a 2014 BBC radio adaptation of the novella starring Candis Nergaard as Carmen and William Ash as Don Jose.

== Notes and references ==
Notes

Sources

- Boynton, Susan (n.d.). "Bizet: Carmen – Prosper Mérimée's Novella, Carmen". www.columbia.edu.
- Briggs, A. D. P. (2008), "Did Carmen really come from Russia (with a little help from Turgenev)?", in Andrew, Joe; Offord Derek; Reid, Robert (eds.), Turgenev and Russian Culture: Essays to Honour Richard Peace, Rodopi, pp. 83–102, ISBN 978-90-420-2399-4
- Lejeune, Jean-François (August 2015). "Review: La Tragédie de Carmen". Opera News. 80 (2). Archived from the original on 2016-06-04.
- Robinson, Peter (1992). "Mérimée's Carmen". In McClary, Susan (ed.). Georges Bizet, Carmen. Cambridge University Press. p. 1. ISBN 0-521-39897-5.
