= Przylep, Lubusz Voivodeship =

Przylep
- District of Zielona Góra
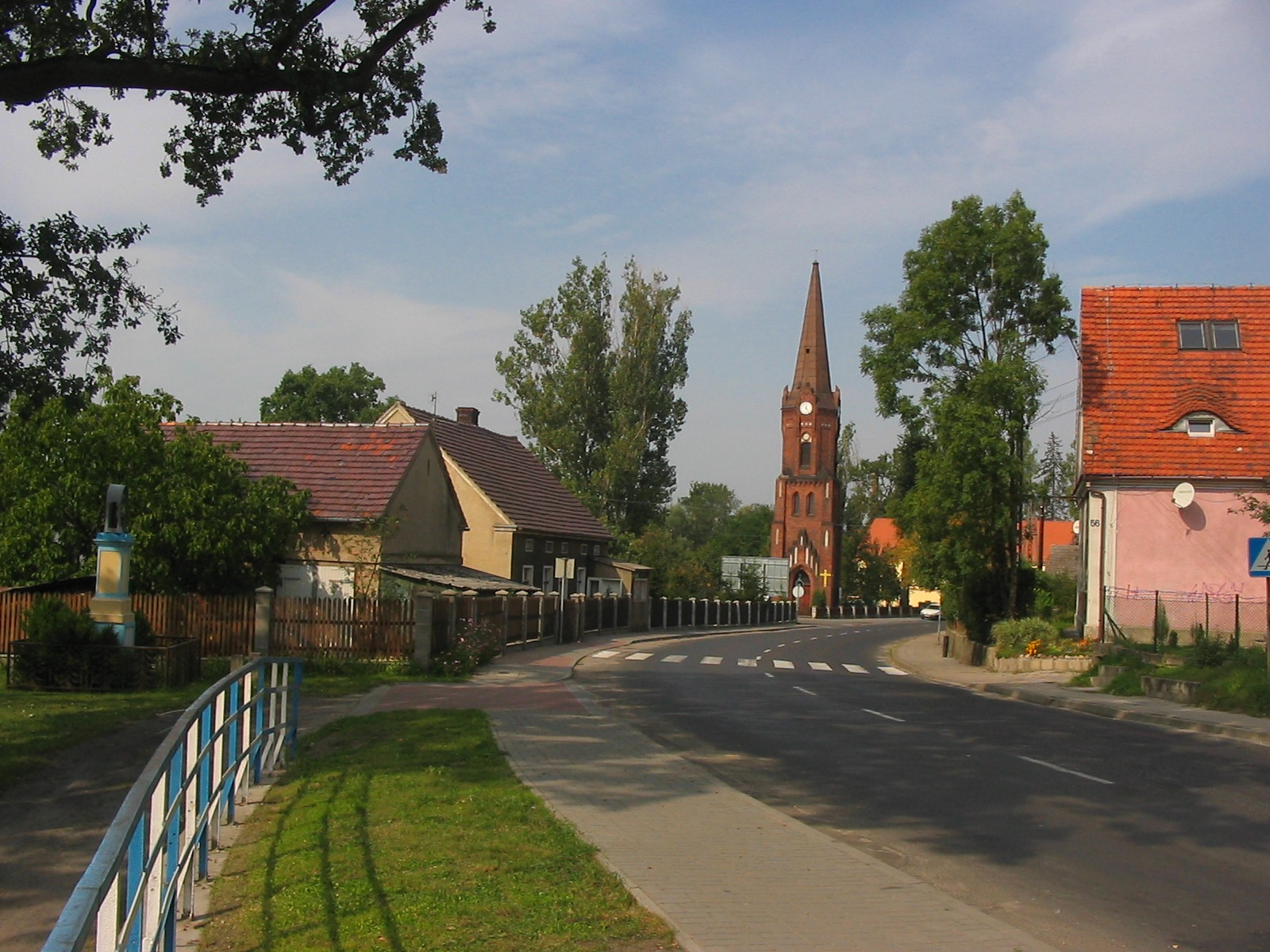
- A street in Przylep

- Location within Poland
- Coordinates: 51°58′12″N 15°26′58″E
- Country: Poland
- Voivodeship: Lubusz
- County: Zielona Góra County

Population
  - Total: 2,700
- Time zone: UTC+1 (CET)
  - Summer (DST): UTC+2 (CEST)
- Postal code: 66-015

Przylep [ˈpʂɨlɛp] is a district of the city of Zielona Góra, in western Poland, located in the northwestern part of the city. It was a separate village until 2014.

During World War II the Germans established and operated a subcamp of the Gross-Rosen concentration camp in the village, whose prisoners were Jews.
