= Carmen (1915 Raoul Walsh film) =

1915 film directed by Raoul Walsh

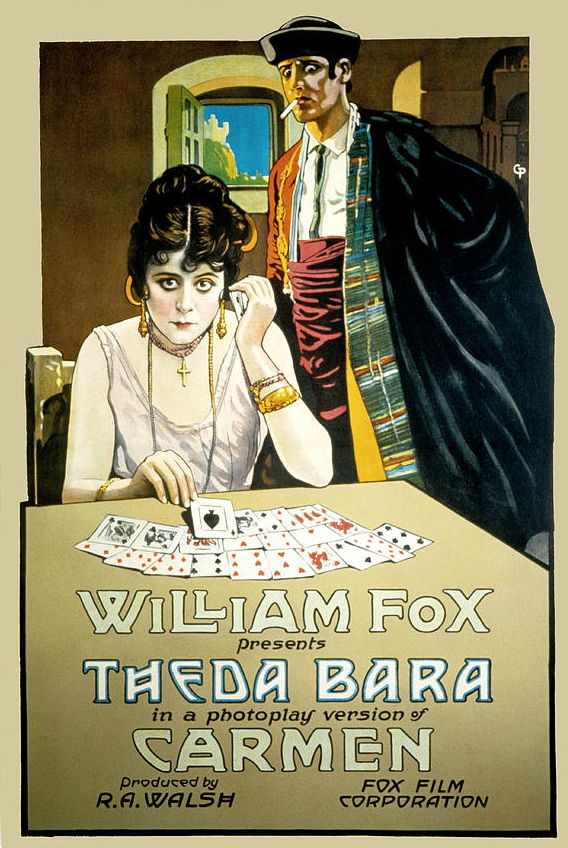
- Film poster
- Directed by: Raoul Walsh
- Written by: Raoul Walsh (scenario)
- Based on: Carmen by Prosper Mérimée
- Starring: Theda Bara; Einar Linden
- Cinematography: Georges Benoît; George Schneiderman
- Distributed by: Fox Film Corporation
- Release date: November 1, 1915
- Running time: 5 reels
- Country: United States
- Language: Silent with English intertitles
- Budget: $200,000

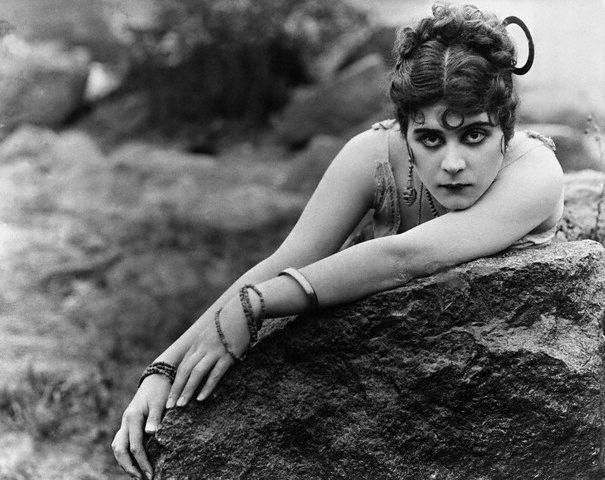
Theda Bara as Carmen

Carmen is a 1915 American silent drama film, written and directed by Raoul Walsh, which starred Theda Bara. It is based on the 1845 novella Carmen, the film was shot at the Fox Studio in Fort Lee, New Jersey.

== Cast ==
- Theda Bara as Carmen
- Einar Linden as Don Jose
- Carl Harbaugh as Escamillo
- James A. Marcus as Dancaire
- Emil De Varney as Captain Morales
- Elsie MacLeod as Michaela
- Fay Tunis as Carlotta
- Joseph P. Green

== Preservation ==
With no prints of Carmen located in any film archives, it is considered a lost film.

== See also ==
- List of lost films
- Carmen, surviving film adaption of Carmen also released in November 1915 directed by Cecil B. DeMille
- 1937 Fox vault fire
