= 1983 in German television =

This is a list of German television related events from 1983.

== Events ==
- 20 March - Hoffmann & Hoffmann are selected to represent Germany at the 1983 Eurovision Song Contest with their song "Rücksicht". They are selected to be the twenty-eighth German Eurovision entry during Ein Lied für München held at the BR Studios in Munich.
- 23 April - The 28th Eurovision Song Contest is held at the Rudi-Sedlmayer-Halle in Munich. Luxembourg wins the contest with the song "Si la vie est cadeau", performed by Corinne Hermès.

== Debuts ==
=== ARD ===
- 7 January – Kontakt bitte... (1983–1987)
- 13 January – Es ist angerichtet (1983)
- 24 January – 6 Richtige (1983)
- 2 March – Monaco Franze - Der ewige Stenz (1983)
- 5 April – Formel Eins (1983–1990)
- 10 April – Abenteuer Bundesrepublik (1983)
- 17 April – Schau ins Land (1983)
- 25 April – Selbst ist die Frau (1983)
- 27 June – Engel auf Rädern (1983)
- 14 July – Köberle kommt (1983)
- 25 July – Vom Webstuhl zur Weltmacht (1983)
- 19 October – Landluft (1983)
- 23 October – Rote Erde (1983)
- 31 December – Geschichten aus der Heimat (1983–1994)

=== ZDF ===
- 21 May – Deep Water (1983)
- 1 June – Wagen 106 (1983)
- 22 June – Konsul Möllers Erben (1983)
- 4 August – Der Paragraphenwirt (1983)
- 1 September – Unsere schönsten Jahre (1983–1985)
- 24 September – Gestern bei Müllers (1983)
- 2 October – Bettkantengeschichten (1983–1990)
- 3 November – Ich heirate eine Familie (1983–1986)
- 20 December – Weißblaue Geschichten (1983–2016)
- 24 December – Waldheimat (1983–1984)
- 25 December –
  - Nesthäkchen (1983)
  - Diese Drombuschs (1983–1994)
- 27 December – Zelleriesalat (1983)

=== DFF ===
- 9 January – Märkische Chronik (1983–1989)
- 20 September – Der Bastard (1983)
- 9 October – Martin Luther (1983)
- 28 October – Bühne frei (1983)
- 31 December – Ferienheim Bergkristall (1983–1989)

== Television shows ==
=== 1950s ===
- Tagesschau (1952–present)

=== 1960s ===
- heute (1963-present)

=== 1970s ===
- heute-journal (1978-present)
- Tagesthemen (1978-present)

=== 1980s ===
- Wetten, dass..? (1981-2014)

== Networks and services ==
=== Conversions and rebrandings ===
Old network name	New network name	Type	Conversion Date	Notes	Source
Hessisches Fernsehprogramm	Hessen Drei	Cable television	Unknown		
