= One (German TV channel) =

German free-to-air television channel

- Country: Germany
- Broadcast area: Germany
- Network: ARD
- Headquarters: Cologne, Germany

Programming
- Language: German
- Picture format: 1080p HDTV (downscaled to 720p for digital satellite and cable)

Ownership
- Sister channels: Das Erste; NDR Fernsehen; Tagesschau24; ARD-alpha

History
- Launched: 30 August 1997; 29 years ago
- Closed: January 1, 2027; 49 days' time
- Former names: EinsFestival (1997–2009); Einsfestival (2009–2016)

Links
- Website: one.ard.de

Availability

Terrestrial
- Digital terrestrial television: Varies on each location

Streaming media
- one.ard.de: Watch live (Germany only)

One (stylized as one) is a German free-to-air television channel owned and operated by the German public-broadcasting consortium ARD. Managed since October 2005 by Westdeutscher Rundfunk on behalf of ARD as a whole, the channel was launched (as EinsFestival) on 30 August 1997.

== History ==
On 29 July 2016, WDR announced that from early September 2016 Einsfestival became One and became a channel specifically aimed at viewers aged between 30 and 49. The channel's website, Twitter, and Facebook presences were updated on 1 September 2016, and the on-air rebrand took effect on 3 September 2016, starting with adoption of the new screen identification at 0.00 and ending with the final adjustment of all aspects of the channel's visual design at 10.00.

The rebrand was aimed at increasing awareness of the station as an entertainment channel, particularly among viewers under 30.

On 15 November 2022, One closed its SDTV feed across its cable and satellite feeds, which means it is now only available in HD.

In March 2026, it was announced that One will close in January 2027 as part of a consolidation of the digital channels among ARD and ZDF; its remit will be assumed by ZDFneo, which will be rebranded as Neo and become a joint venture of the two broadcasters.

== Content ==
One concentrates on entertainment, and the channel's content is very largely made up of repeat broadcasts of programmes already shown on other ARD channels, national and regional: this includes cinema and television films, drama series, documentaries, reports, magazines, and music programmes (especially rock and pop).

Since the 2004 Summer Olympics, ARD and ZDF have used their digital television channels (respectively, One and ZDFneo) to broadcast additional coverage of such sporting events as the Olympic Games and the UEFA European Football Championship. For example, during UEFA Euro 2008 and the 2010 FIFA World Cup these digital channels were used to provide coverage of different matches taking place simultaneously.

One also carries the semi-finals of the Eurovision Song Contest, as well as the final (which is also broadcast by ARD's principal channel, Das Erste).

- alfredissimo! (2017–present)
- Altes Geld (2017)
- Aus heiterem Himmel (2017–present)
- Bis in die Spitzen, German version of Cutting It (2011-2012, 2015)
- Bernard (2009-2010)
- Bobobobs (Die Bobobobs) (1997-2009)
- Boulevard Bio (2005-2007)
- Boj (Upcoming in 2021)
- Buffy the Vampire Slayer (Buffy – Im Bann der Dämonen) (2010-2011)
- Class (2017–present)
- Cleverman (2017–present)
- Clipster (2012-2013)
- coldmirror (2010–2016)
- Come Fly with Me (2017–present)
- Das Lachen der anderen (2015-2016)
- Dawson's Creek (2017–present)
- Die Story im Ersten (2010–present)
- Die Wiwaldi-Show (2012, 2015)
- Dittsche (2005–present)
- Doctor Doctor (The Heart Guy) (2018–present)
- Doctor Who (2016–present)
- Domian (2006-2009)
- Earth 2 (2009)
- Echo Music Prize (2009-2016)
- EINSWEITER (2008-2015)
- euromaxx (2010–present)
- Eurovision Song Contest (2006-2008, 2010–present)
- Fawlty Towers (2010-2011)
- Frikjent (Lifjord - Der Freispruch) (2017–present)
- extra 3 (2006–present)
- frauTV (2013, 2015–present)
- Graf Yoster (2004)
- Hier und heute (2015-2017)
- In aller Freundschaft (2003-2005)
- In the Club (In the Club - Schwanger und was dann?) (2016–present)
- Inas Nacht (2008–present)
- Ladies Night (2007–present)
- Les Petits Meurtres d'Agatha Christie (Agatha Christie: Mörderische Spiele) (2017–present)
- Little Britain (2016–present)
- Lindenstraße (2001–present)
- Love, Nina (2017–present)
- mannTV (2016)
- Meuchelbeck (2015)
- Miss Fisher's Murder Mysteries (Miss Fishers mysteriöse Mordfälle) (2016-2017)
- Mord mit Aussicht (2013–present)
- Murder, She Wrote (Mord ist ihr Hobby) (2012-2013)
- NightWash (2006-2007, 2009–present)
- Nuhr im Ersten (2009–present)
- Nurse Jackie (2016–present)
- Polizeiinspektion 1 (2004)
- Polizeiruf 110 (2001–present)
- PussyTerror TV (2015–present)
- Quarks & Caspers (2010–present)
- Quarks & Co. (2008–present)
- Salto Mortale (2004-2005, 2007-2008, 2017)
- Sensitive Skin (2017–present)
- Shaun the Sheep (Shaun das Schaf) (2008-2016)
- Shuffle (2016–present)
- Sturm der Liebe (2011–present)
- Tatort (2006–present)
- Top of the Pops: 1970s
- The Game (2015)
- The IT Crowd (2017–present)
- The Job Lot (2017–present)
- The Tonight Show Starring Jimmy Fallon (2016–2017)
- Threesome (2018)
- Torchwood (2017–present)
- Türkisch für Anfänger (2006–present)
- twentysomething (2013, 2016–present)
- Verbotene Liebe (2011-2013)
- Vorstadtweiber (2015–present)
- Uncle (2017–present)
- Zapp (2005-2008, 2011–2019)
- Zimmer frei! (2006-2009, 2011-2016)
- Zwei am großen See (2009, 2011, 2017)

== Broadcasting ==
SD broadcasting via satellite (Astra 19.2) stopped on 12 January 2021.

== High-definition feeds ==
From 21 to 24 March 2008 Einsfestival ran HDTV test broadcasts via satellite and digital cable (exclusively on Kabel BW). The first HD transmissiones came from the Internationale Funkausstellung Berlin. Between 22 December 2008 and 1 January 2009 Einsfestival again aired HD test shows. SD feed is due to end on 15 November 2022, with One HD remaining.

== Channel logos ==
Logo until April 2005

Logo until October 2005

Logo until September 2009

EinsFestival HD logo until September 2009

Logo until 2 September 2016

Einsfestival HD logo until 2 September 2016

One logo since 3 September 2016

One logo with slogan ("One for you")

One HD logo since 3 September 2016

== Audience share ==
=== Germany ===
	January	February	March	April	May	June	July	August	September	October	November	December	Annual average
2017	0.4%	0.5%	0.5%	0.5%	0.6%	0.6%	0.7%	0.6%	0.6%	0.6%	0.6%	0.7%	0.6%
2018	0.6%												
