= Julia Biedermann =

German television actress

- Born: 15 March 1967 (age 59); West Berlin, West Germany
- Occupation: Actress
- Years active: 1981–present

Julia Biedermann (born 15 March 1967) is a German television actress.

She has made many appearances mostly in television since 1981. In 1993 she appeared in the Austrian set comedy film Hochwürden erbt das Paradies.

== Selected filmography ==
- Manni, der Libero (1982, TV series)
- Mandara (1983, TV miniseries)
- Ich heirate eine Familie (1983–1986, TV series)
- Praxis Bülowbogen (1987–1990, TV series)
- A Touch of Danger (1988, TV film)
- Ein Schloß am Wörthersee (1990–1991, TV series)
- Der Landarzt (1992–1993, 1996, TV series)
- Hochwürden erbt das Paradies (1993, TV film)
- Blankenese (1994, TV series)
- Marienhof (1995, TV series)
