= Legend of a Gunfighter =

1964 film

- Directed by: Rolf Olsen
- Written by: Paul Clydeburn; Don Sharp
- Produced by: Kurt Ulrich
- Starring: Thomas Fritsch; Walter Giller; Judith Dornys; Gustav Knuth; Heidemarie Hatheyer; Peter Neusser; Ingrid van Bergen; Ron Randell; Rudolf Schündler
- Cinematography: Hanns Matula
- Edited by: Friedel Welsandt
- Music by: Erwin Halletz
- Production companies: Berolina Film; Wiener Stadthalle-Station Betriebs-und Produktionsgesellschaft
- Distributed by: Nora-Filmverleih (W.Germany); Bavaria Film (Austria)
- Release dates: 26 November 1964 (West Germany); December 1964 (Austria)
- Running time: 102 minutes
- Countries: West Germany; Austria
- Language: German

Legend of a Gunfighter (German: Heiss weht der Wind, lit. 'The Wind Blows Hot'; also known as Mein Freund Shorty, 'My Friend Shorty') is a 1964 Western film from West Germany. It stars Thomas Fritsch and was directed by Rolf Olsen. It was part of a boom in German westerns following the success of the Karl May series of adaptations.

It was co written by Don Sharp and co-starred Ron Randell. Both men were Australians. Location shooting took place in Croatia and Slovenia. The film's sets were designed by the art directors Willi Herrmann, Leo Metzenbauer and Otto Pischinger.

== Cast ==
- Thomas Fritsch as Chris Harper
- Gustav Knuth as Richard Bradley
- Judith Dornys as Meg Bradley
- Heidemarie Hatheyer as Ann Bradley
- Ingrid van Bergen as Linda
- Ilse Peternell
- Peter Neusser as Jack Bradley
- Rudolf Schündler as Rufus Harper
- Ron Randell as Al Nutting
- Walter Giller as Spike Sunday
- Demeter Bitenc
