= Peter Weck =

Austrian film director and actor

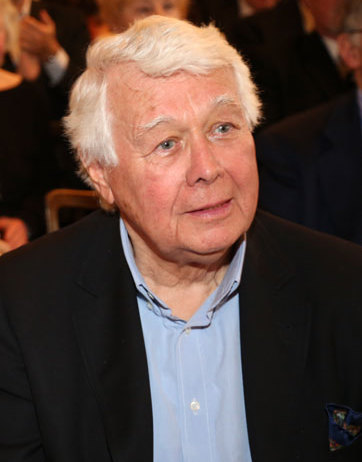
- Peter Weck in May 2013
- Born: 12 August 1930 (age 95); Vienna, Austria
- Occupations: Film actor Film director
- Years active: 1954 – present
- Spouse: Ingrid Muttone (m. 1967; died 2012)
- Children: two

Peter Weck (born 12 August 1930) is an Austrian film director and actor. In addition to his about 130 film and television acting credits between 1954 and 2015, he worked as a director on more than 50 productions between 1969 and 2007.

== Biography ==
Weck studied acting at the University of Music and Performing Arts Vienna and the Max Reinhardt Seminar. He made his film debut in 1954 and had a supporting role as Karl Ludwig of Austria in the 1955 historical drama Sissi (1955) with Romy Schneider. Weck found himself typecast in comedic and romantic roles in light entertainment films. He also appeared in a number of international film productions, as choir conductor Max Heller in the music film Almost Angels (1962) and as Romy Schneider's husband in Otto Premingers monumental drama The Cardinal (1963). In the 1980s, Weck had a leading role as the family father in the German television sitcom Ich heirate eine Familie (I Marry a Family).

Starting with the comedy film Help, I Love Twins, Weck also regularly worked as a film and television director until the 2000s. He directed his own sitcom Ich heirate eine Familie and a number of Tatort episodes. He was also successful as a stage director for a number of theatres which work together in the organization Vereinigte Bühnen Wien, co-founded by Weck in 1987. As a Theater manager in Vienna during the 1980s, he was responsible for the German-language premieres of the Andrew Lloyd Webber musicals Cats and The Phantom of the Opera. He also produced the original production of Elisabeth in 1992.

== Selected filmography ==
=== Actor ===
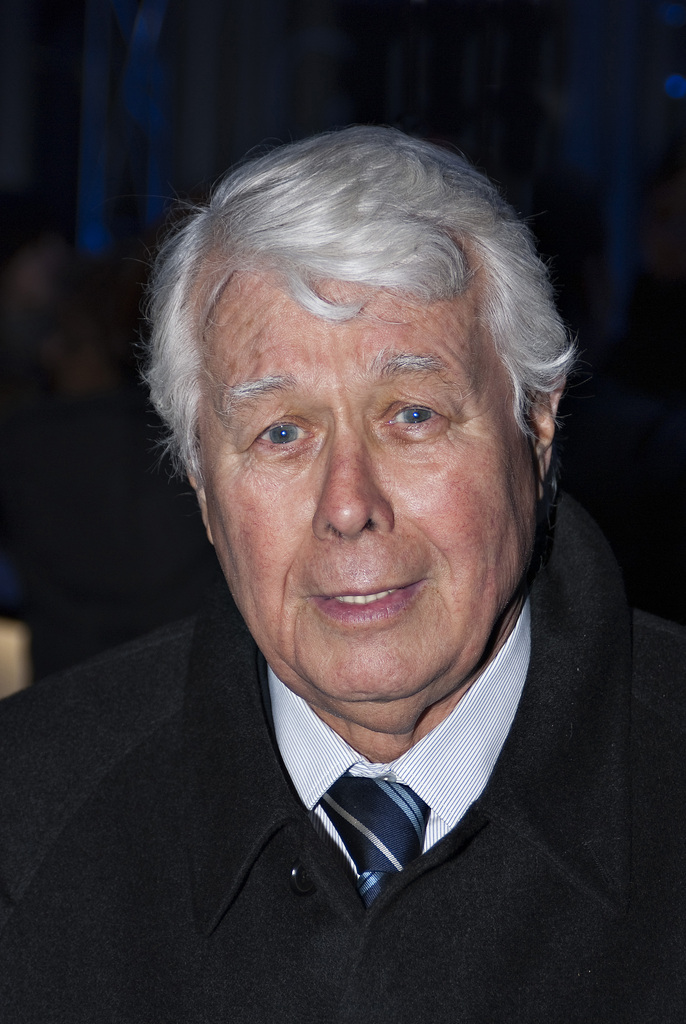
Peter Weck in 2009

- Victoria in Dover (1954)
- Sissi (1955)
- The Stolen Trousers (1956)
- Her Corporal (1956)
- One Should Be Twenty Again (1958)
- Paradise for Sailors (1959)
- Rendezvous in Vienna (1959)
- I Will Always Be Yours (1960)
- The Dream of Lieschen Mueller (1961)
- Mariandl (1961)
- Almost Angels (1962)
- Mariandl's Homecoming (1962)
- The Bird Seller (1962)
- The Bandit and the Princess (1962)
- The Forester's Daughter (1962)
- Leutnant Gustl (1963, TV film)
- Is Geraldine an Angel? (1963)
- The Cardinal (1963)
- Marry Me, Cherie (1964)
- When the Grapevines Bloom on the Danube (1965)
- Always Trouble with the Teachers (1968)
- Why Did I Ever Say Yes Twice? (1969)
- Our Doctor is the Best (1969)
- The Reverend Turns a Blind Eye (1971)
- Who Laughs Last, Laughs Best (1971)
- My Daughter, Your Daughter (1972)
- Trouble with Trixie (1972)
- Always Trouble with the Reverend (1972)
- Merry-Go-Round (1973)
- Ich heirate eine Familie (1983–1986, TV series)
- I Desire You (1995, TV film)
- Alte Liebe – Neues Glück (1996, TV film)
- Aimee & Jaguar (1999)
- Die Rosenkönigin (2007, TV film)
- Grandma Rules (2012, TV film)
- The 7th Dwarf (2014)

=== Director ===
- Help, I Love Twins (1969)
- Nachbarn sind zum Ärgern da (1970)
- Wenn mein Schätzchen auf die Pauke haut (1971)
- Don't Get Angry (1972)
- Kolportage (1980, TV film) — (based on Kolportage by Georg Kaiser)
- Ein Kleid von Dior (1982, TV film) — (based on Mrs. 'Arris Goes to Paris)
- Ich heirate eine Familie (1983–1986, TV series)
- I Desire You (1995, TV film)
- Alte Liebe – Neues Glück (1996, TV film) — (Remake of Der Hofrat Geiger and Mariandl)
- Die Rosenkönigin (2007, TV film)

== Decorations and awards ==
- 1980: Title of Professor (awarded by the Austrian Ministry of Education)
- 1984: Bambi Award
- 1984: Golden Camera Award for Best Director for Ich heirate eine Familie (I married a family)
- 1985: Golden Europe (Goldene Europa)
- 1985: Golden Camera Award in the category of Most Popular TV Series pair (1st place HÖRZU reader's choice) (with Thekla Carola Wied)
- 1985: Golden Medal of Honour for Services to the City of Vienna
- 1988: Telestar
- 1990: Bambi Award
- 1990: Title Kammerschauspieler
- 1990: Heinrich Abelé Award
- 1990: Golden Romy as Favoured series Star
- 1991: Karl Valentin Order
- 1991: Tourism Award of the Vienna Chamber of Commerce for the musical Cats
- 1992: Golden Europe
- 1992: Golden Rathausmann
- 1993: Austrian Decoration for Science and Art
- 1993: Year of the Gourmet
- 1993: Bacchus
- 1996: Germany International Musical Award for his outstanding service to the German-language musical
- 2000: Great Gold Medal for services to the province of Lower Austria
- 2001: Gold Medal of Vienna
- 2004: Grand Decoration of Honour in Silver for Services to the Republic of Austria (Grosses Silbernes Ehrenzeichen)
- 2005: Platinum Romy for lifetime achievement
- 2012: Crown of folk music for life work
