= Georg Thomalla =

German actor

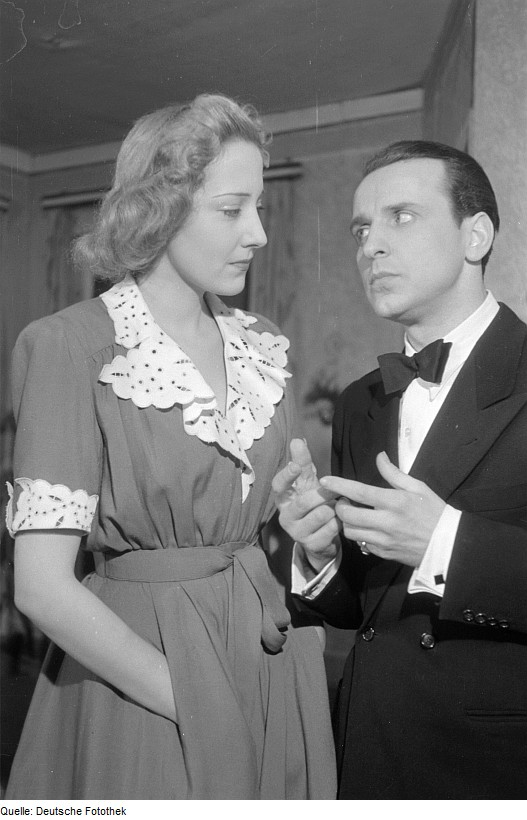
- 1946
- Born: Georg Valentin Thomalla; 14 February 1915; Kattowitz, Upper Silesia, German Empire
- Died: 25 August 1999 (aged 84); Starnberg, Bavaria, Germany
- Occupation: Actor

Georg Thomalla (14 February 1915 – 25 August 1999) was a German actor. He appeared in about one hundred fifty film and television productions between 1939 and 2000 and was widely known in Germany for his comedic roles.

Thomalla was well known in Germany as a voiceover artist, dubbing particularly comedians, such as Peter Sellers as Inspector Clouseau in the Pink Panther movies, and he was the standard German dubbing voice of Jack Lemmon from 1955 to 1998. Thomalla dubbed Lemmon as the second musician in Some Like It Hot, after having himself played the same role in the German comedy Fanfares of Love (1951), the direct predecessor to Some Like It Hot. Thomalla met Lemmon at the 1996 Berlin International Film Festival, where he gave a speech in Lemmon's honor.

He was awarded the German Federal Cross of Merit in 1985.

== Selected filmography ==
- Her First Experience (1939) - Otto
- Small Town Poet (1940) - Siegfried, Angestellter bei Emil
- Above All Else in the World (1941) - Uffz. Krause
- Jungens (1941) - Jochen Krafft
- Stukas (1941) - Unteroffizier Matz
- We Make Music (1942) - Franz Sperling
- The Crew of the Dora (1943) - Bordschütze Unteroffizier Fritz Mott
- Ein schöner Tag (1944)
- Nora (1944)
- Herr Sanders lebt gefährlich (1944) - Inspizient (uncredited)
- Der große Preis (1944) - Borchardt
- A Cheerful House (1944) - Mann mit Platz in der Schlange
- Tierarzt Dr. Vlimmen (1944) - Stallbursche
- Anna Alt (1945) - Heinz Wichert
- Heidesommer (1945)
- Die tolle Susanne (1945)
- Peter Voss, Thief of Millions (1946) - Max Egon Flipp
- Tell the Truth (1946) - Dr. Klimm - sein Rechtsanwalt
- King of Hearts (1947) - Leutnant
- By a Nose (1949) - Max, Mixer in der Kolibri-Bar
- Don't Play with Love (1949) - Peter
- Die seltsame Geschichte des Brandner Kaspar (1949) - Knospe
- Der große Fall (1949) - Fred
- Three Girls Spinning (1950) - Udo
- The Reluctant Maharaja (1950) - Attentäter
- One Night Apart (1950) - Bollmann
- Fanfares of Love (1951) - Peter
- Queen of the Night (1951) - Peter von Hazi
- Dark Eyes (1951) - McKing, Impresario
- A Very Big Child (1952) - Hans Hochberg
- My Wife Is Being Stupid (1952) - Conny Weber
- The Prince of Pappenheim (1952) - Charly Rosner
- The Chaste Libertine (1952) - Max Stieglitz
- Mikosch Comes In (1952) - Janos Nawratil
- Dancing Stars (1952) - Bob Gregorian
- The Uncle from America (1953) - Bodo Schmidt
- Lady's Choice (1953) - Max
- Fanfare of Marriage (1953) - Peter Schmidt
- The Charming Young Lady (1953) - Paul Norman
- It Was Always So Nice With You (1954) - Texter Karlchen Holler
- The Telephone Operator (1954) - Peter Lindner
- The Seven Dresses of Katrin (1954) - Graf Felix 'Lixi' Hohenstein
- Victoria and Her Hussar (1954)
- Secrets of the City (1955) - Paul Martinek
- As Long as There Are Pretty Girls (1955) - Ernst
- Request Concert (1955) - Willy Vogel
- Sky Without Stars (1955) - Willi Becker
- Mensch ärger' dich nicht! (1955)
- My Aunt, Your Aunt (1956) - Tommy Schneider
- Musikparade (1956) - Tommy
- Ein Mann muß nicht immer schön sein (1956) - Paul Späth
- A Piece of Heaven (1957) - Willi
- Victor and Victoria (1957) - Viktor Hempel
- Aunt Wanda from Uganda (1957) - Jonas Edelmuth
- Das Glück liegt auf der Straße (1957) - Tobby Zimmt
- Junger Mann, der alles kann (1957) - Karl Gerdes, Koch
- Ein Stück vom Himmel (1958) - Willi
- Scampolo (1958) - Andreas Michaels
- Ooh... diese Ferien (1958) - Max Petermann
- That Won't Keep a Sailor Down (1958) - Valdemar V. Olsen
- Das verbotene Paradies (1958) - Narrator (voice, uncredited)
- Die Sklavenkarawane (1958) - Hadschi Halef Omar
- Paprika (1959) - Paul
- Der Löwe von Babylon (1959) - Hadschi Halef Omar
- Lass mich am Sonntag nicht allein (1959) - Edi Gruber
- Juanito (1960) - Paddy
- The Haunted Castle (1960) - Onkel Max
- Pichler's Books Are Not in Order (1961) - Vittgers
- Adieu, Lebewohl, Goodbye (1961) - Luciano Moretti
- Komische Geschichten mit Georg Thomalla (1961–1971, TV Series) - Tommi
- The Dream of Lieschen Mueller (1961) - Reporter
- Ramona (1961) - Tom Kroll
- Nie hab ich nie gesagt (1962, TV Movie) - Herman
- The Bird Seller (1962) - Kurfürst August
- Snow White and the Seven Jugglers (1962) - Clown Lukas
- The Bandit and the Princess (1962) - Krummfinger Achilles
- The Forester's Daughter (1962) - Simmerl, Flickschneider
- With Best Regards (1963) - Ferdinand Blume, Lohnbuchhalter
- Bezauberndes Fräulein (1963, TV Movie) - Paul
- Tote zahlen keine Steuern (1963, TV Movie) - Marco Veccietti
- Casanova wider Willen (1964, TV Movie) - Max Stieglitz
- Gerechtigkeit in Worowogorsk (1964, TV Movie) - Defense Lawyer Kaljakin
- Der König mit dem Regenschirm (1964, TV Movie)
- Tales of a Young Scamp (1964) - Geheimrat
- Don't Tell Me Any Stories (1964) - Hugo Bach
- Weekend in Paradise (1965, TV Movie) - Regierungsrat Dittchen
- Unser Pauker (1965–1966, TV Series, 20 episodes) - Ulrich Schulz
- I Am Looking for a Man (1966) - Astrologe Neumann
- When Ludwig Goes on Manoeuvres (1967) - Hauptmann Stumpf
- Zur Hölle mit den Paukern (1968) - Kurt Nietnagel
- Always Trouble with the Teachers (1968) - Studienrat Dr. Schwabmann
- Our Doctor is the Best (1969) - Waldemar Kosel
- Herzblatt oder Wie sag ich’s meiner Tochter? (1969) - Paul Tillmann
- Help, I Love Twins (1969) - Uncle Fritz
- The Animals' Conference (1969) - The Lion (voice)
- Dornwittchen und Schneeröschen (1970) - Erzähler (voice)
- Hurra, unsere Eltern sind nicht da (1970) - Alois Wimmer
- Unsere Pauker gehen in die Luft (1970) - Oskar Weber / Harry Weber
- Nachbarn sind zum Ärgern da (1970) - Otto Sauser
- Hurray We Are Bachelors Again (1971) - Joachim Brinkmann
- Einer spinnt immer (1971) - Hugo Haase
- Holidays in Tyrol (1971) - Christian Meier
- The Reverend Turns a Blind Eye (1971) - Pfarrer Himmelreich
- Kinderarzt Dr. Fröhlich (1972) - Dr. Guido Zwiesel
- My Daughter, Your Daughter (1972) - Studienrat Dr. Oskar Sommer
- Always Trouble with the Reverend (1972) - Pfarrer Himmelreich
- Don't Get Angry (1972) - Ewald Fröhlich
- Crazy – Completely Mad (1973) - Oskar Müller
- Wenn jeder Tag ein Sonntag wär (1973) - Dr. Karl Maria Wegner
- Auch ich war nur ein mittelmäßiger Schüler (1974) - Prof. Dr. Fabian
- Der Tiefstapler (1978) - Christian Sturm
- Schimpo, was macht ein Aff' in Afrika? (1979)
- Kolportage (1980, TV Movie) - Barrenkrona
- Kintopp Kintopp (1981, TV Series) - Tommy Schnell
- Vater einer Tochter (1981, TV Movie) - Robert Stegemann
- Georg Thomallas Geschichten (1982, TV Series)
- Ein Abend mit Georg Thomalla (1982–1985, TV Series) - Peter Winter / Fred Paschke / Willi / Alexander Fischer / Manfred Freiwald / Tommy / Klaus Sommer
- Durchreise – Die Geschichte einer Firma (1985, TV Movie) - Max Salomon
- Ein Mann ist soeben erschossen worden (1985, TV Movie) - Comisario Ruíz
- Willi – Ein Aussteiger steigt ein (1990, TV Movie) - Willi Placzek
- Das Geld liegt auf der Bank (1990, TV Movie) - Gustav Kühne
- Kleiner Mann im großen Glück (1992, TV Movie) - Willi Platzek
- Lilien in der Bank (1996) - Wilhelm Willert

Television Series Episodes

- Polizeiinspektion 1: Der Schatten (1988) - Max Huber
- Meister Eder und sein Pumuckl: Eders Weihnachtsgeschenk (1988) - Preisslkofer
- Ein Schloß am Wörthersee: Ein Dinner für zwei (1990) - Harry Weber
- The Old Fox: Der amerikanische Onkel (1992) - Werner Lorenz
- Das Traumschiff: India and Maldives (1993) - Ewald Kolbus
- Klinik unter Palmen: Die Nächte der Kreolin (1998) - Walter Sobotzik
- At Your Own Risk: Ladendiebe (2000) - Jakob Landau

=== German-language Dubbing ===
- Jean Richard (Siméon), in It Can't Always Be Caviar (1961)
- Jean Richard (Siméon), in This Time It Must Be Caviar (1961)
- Walo Lüönd (Kriminalbeamter Hase), in The Invisible Dr. Mabuse (1962)
- Cliff Edwards in Pinocchio (1940 film) (1951 and 1971 dubs)
