= Our Doctor Is the Best =

Our Doctor is the Best
- Directed by: Harald Vock
- Written by: Kurt Nachmann
- Produced by: Günther Eulau; Karl Spiehs
- Starring: Roy Black; Helga Anders; Peter Weck
- Cinematography: Kurt Junek
- Edited by: Traude Krappl-Maass
- Music by: Werner Twardy
- Production companies: Divina-Film; Lisa Film
- Distributed by: Gloria Film
- Release date: 22 July 1969
- Running time: 85 minutes
- Country: West Germany
- Language: German

Our Doctor is the Best (German: Unser Doktor ist der Beste) is a 1969 West German comedy film directed by Harald Vock and starring Roy Black, Helga Anders and Peter Weck.

The film's sets were designed by the art director Karl Schneider.

== Plot ==
Young doctor Leonhard Somner, who just finished his degree starts an internship in the private hospital of its chief Professor Jansen. Initially, he is mistaken by Nurse Lonie as a repairman requested to repair the hospital's chief's private bathroom and ends up being late for his first day in work. The hospital chief is not impressed as he already has some prejudices against Dr. Somner, who unknowingly received help by a friend to secure the internship. The strict head nurse also tries to confuse him with his first diagnosis of little Wilma in the children's ward, but soon realises that Leonhard is quite knowledgeable in his field. Widowed car seller Waldemar Kosel sustains a concussion while demonstrating a car to the said Dr. Somner ends up in the same hospital. Meanwhile his underage daughter Monika has the time of her life, being home alone and with her friend Hotte they play all kinds of pranks on the ever unpopular choleric study councillor Zackgiebel, who lives in the same building as the kids. In hospital nurse Lonie and Dr. Sommer fall in love with each other, yet there is some jealousy when Dr. Sommer spends significant time with the hospital owner's wife - although nothing serious happens. Study councillor Zackgiebel informs Monika's strict aunt about her misdemeanors who is not impressed, as for a long time she is convinced that her brother-in-law cannot take proper care of his unruly daughter and wants custody of Monika. When a visit by the aunt is announced Monika and Hotte prepare a specially wet welcome for the aunt. Yet Dr Sommer, who promised Waldemar Kosel to keep an eye on his daughter while he is in hospital comes in just at the right time and can convince them, that any prank will make them more inclined to request sole custody for the aunt. Especially as she brought a child service worker in tow. with Leonhard's help they manage to clean the messy apartment up just in time and the visitors find a well behaved girl in a spic and span tidy apartment, making the study councillor Zackgiebel lose his credibility and her father retains custody. In hospital Loni makes up with Leonhard, but also manages to matchmake Waldemar Kosel with the strict head nurse Hildegart. Leonhard finds out why Professor Jansen has prejudices against him, but his friend who organised the internship with his aunt, a big benefactor of the hospital can clarify the situation and Leonhard's reputation is rehabilitated. Yet the children's ward he worked in was supposed to be closed down, in favour of turning the rooms into a lab. While the benefactor thinks that the Professor intended to extend the children's ward, the professor has to change his mind on the closure. but Monika, Hotte and their friends had meanwhile Co e up with their own plan to help Leonhard out of gratefulness and save the children's ward by pretending they all have the measles. The professor detects the deceit, yet is not angry. He then makes Leonhard the chief of the children's ward. Leonhard, Lonie and the children then go to the park and the film ends with them singing a sing and Leonhard and Lonie sharing a kiss.

== Cast ==
- Roy Black as Dr. Leonhard Sommer
- Helga Anders as Loni Vogt
- Peter Weck as Studienrat Zackgiebel
- Christiane Schmidtmer as Frau Janssen
- Joachim Hansen as Professor Frederik Janssen
- Corinna Genest as Oberschwester Hildegart
- Petra Esser as Monika Kosel
- Gerhard Acktun as Hotte
- Wilma Landkroon as Wilma
- Maria Brockerhoff as Freundin von Frau Janssen
- Gerhart Lippert as Dr. Walter Moll
- Max Mairich as Schuldirektor
- Edda Seippel as Eva-Maria Klarwein
- Käthe Haack as Alma Carisius
- Sissy Löwinger as Krankenschwester
- Helga Weigmann as Walters Freundin
- Karin Heske as Krankenschwester
- Karl-Heinz Peters as Patient mit Gipsbein
- Willy Schultes as Pförtner
- Klaus Hoeft as Lonis Freund
- Georg Thomalla as Waldemar Kosel
- Karl Spiehs as Polizist

== Bibliography ==
- Bock, Hans-Michael & Bergfelder, Tim. The Concise CineGraph. Encyclopedia of German Cinema. Berghahn Books, 2009.
