= Always Trouble with the Reverend =

- Directed by: Harald Vock
- Written by: Harald Vock
- Produced by: Karl Spiehs
- Starring: Georg Thomalla; Peter Weck; Chris Roberts
- Cinematography: Heinz Hölscher
- Edited by: Eva Zeyn
- Music by: Gerhard Heinz
- Production company: Divina-Film
- Distributed by: Gloria Film
- Release date: 12 October 1972
- Running time: 85 minutes
- Country: West Germany
- Language: German

Always Trouble with the Reverend (German: Immer Ärger mit Hochwürden) is a 1972 West German comedy film directed by Harald Vock and starring Georg Thomalla, Peter Weck and Chris Roberts. It is a sequel to the 1971 film The Reverend Turns a Blind Eye.

Like the previous film it was shot around Lake Wörthersee in Carinthia.

== Cast ==
- Georg Thomalla as Pfarrer Himmelreich
- Peter Weck as Thomas Springer
- Chris Roberts as Rainer Kurzmann
- Heidi Hansen as Beate Bessen
- Theo Lingen as Bischof
- Otto Schenk as Oskar
- Eddi Arent as Punchen
- Heinz Reincke as Alfred
- Carlos Werner
- Ossy Kolmann
- Kurt Nachmann as Kalweit
- Eva Garden as Mascha Weber
- Guido Wieland as Bürgermeister
- Erich Padalewski
- Gretl Löwinger
- Norbert Kammil

== Bibliography ==
- Hans-Michael Bock and Tim Bergfelder. The Concise Cinegraph: An Encyclopedia of German Cinema. Berghahn Books, 2009.
