= The Reverend Turns a Blind Eye =

- Directed by: Harald Vock
- Written by: Harald Vock
- Produced by: Günther Köpf; Erich Tomek
- Starring: Roy Black; Uschi Glas; Georg Thomalla
- Cinematography: Heinz Hölscher
- Edited by: Eva Zeyn
- Music by: Gerhard Heinz
- Production company: Divina-Film
- Distributed by: Gloria Film
- Release date: 26 November 1971
- Running time: 90 minutes
- Country: West Germany
- Language: German

The Reverend Turns a Blind Eye (German: Hochwürden drückt ein Auge zu) is a 1971 West German comedy film directed by Harald Vock and starring Roy Black, Uschi Glas and Georg Thomalla. It was followed by a 1972 sequel Always Trouble with the Reverend.

It was partly shot on location around Lake Wörthersee in the Austrian state of Carinthia.

== Synopsis ==
A well-meaning priest gets himself into a number of scrapes.

== Cast ==
- Roy Black as Michael Springer
- Uschi Glas as Barbara Jansen
- Georg Thomalla as Pfarrer Himmelreich
- Peter Weck as Thomas Springer
- Fritz Eckhardt as Bischof
- Heinz Reincke as Alfred
- Hans Tügel as Kapitän Jansen
- Elisabeth Felchner as Mathilde
- Erik Frey as Bürgermeister
- Alexander Grill as Bus-Chauffeur
- Elisabeth Stiepl as Frau Bürgermeister
- Guido Wieland as Jochen
- Norbert Kammil
- Johann Sklenka as Matrose
- Myriam Dreifuss as Röschen
- Felix Dvorak as Branmeister
- Rudi Carrell as Rudi Carnel
- Heidi Hansen as Doris
- Ernst H. Hilbich as Polizist
- Paul Klinger as Narrator
- Chris Roberts as Georg

== Bibliography ==
- Hans-Michael Bock and Tim Bergfelder. The Concise Cinegraph: An Encyclopedia of German Cinema. Berghahn Books, 2009.
