= Trace of a Girl =

1967 film

- Directed by: Gustav Ehmck
- Written by: Gustav Ehmck; Susanne Jordan; Egon Mann
- Produced by: Gustav Ehmck
- Starring: Thekla Carola Wied; Gunther Lagarde; Rainer Basedow
- Cinematography: Egon Mann
- Edited by: Jane Hempel
- Music by: Gunter Hampel
- Production company: Ehmck Film
- Distributed by: CS-Film
- Release date: 27 October 1967
- Running time: 79 minutes
- Country: West Germany
- Language: German

Trace of a Girl (German: Spur eines Mädchens) is a 1967 West German drama film directed by Gustav Ehmck and starring Thekla Carola Wied, Gunther Lagarde and Rainer Basedow.

The film won two German Film Awards.

== Cast ==
- Thekla Carola Wied as Hanna
- Gunther Lagarde as Peter
- Rainer Basedow as Landwirt
- Günter Seuren as Schriftsteller
- Hermann Hartmann as Father
- Birgit Füllenbach as Mother
- Charles Wilp as Fotograf

== Bibliography ==
- Peter Cowie & Derek Elley. World Filmography: 1967. Fairleigh Dickinson University Press, 1977.
