= Sylvia – Eine Klasse für sich =

- Starring: Uschi Glas
- Country of origin: Germany

Sylvia – Eine Klasse für sich (English: Sylvia - A League of Their Own) was a German family series, which was produced by Sat.1.

== Synopsis ==
The teacher Sylvia Waldmann is a popular teacher at Munich's Franz-Josef-Strauss-school (for the Oskar-von-Miller-Gymnasium is the backdrop). Specifically for this position, she moved to Munich. For the students, she is at school and personal problems, the first point of contact.

== Guest stars ==
- Thure Riefenstein
- Heinz Hoenig
- Horst Janson

== See also ==
- List of German television series
