= Ganz in Weiß =

Single by Roy Black
- A-side: "Ganz in Weiß"
- Released: 1965
- Label: Polydor
- Songwriters: Rolf Arland, Kurt Hertha

Roy Black singles chronology
"Du bist nicht allein" (1965)	"Ganz in Weiß" (1965)	"Leg Dein Herz in meine Hände" (1966)

Ganz in Weiß is a song written by Rolf Arland (music) and Kurt Hertha (lyrics) and recorded by Roy Black in 1965. He also recorded an English version I need you and an Italian version Grazie mille, both released in 1966

A 1966 Östen Warnerbring recording named En sommardröm charted at Svensktoppen between 6 August 1966- – 4 February 1967, and topped the chart.

== Charts ==
Chart (1966)	Peak position
Austria	1
Belgium (Flemish chart)	10
West Germany	1
