= Johanna Hohloch =

Austrian actress

- Born: 23 February 1964; Salzburg, Austria
- Occupation: actress

Johanna Hohloch (born 23 February 1964) is a television actress.

In 1993 she appeared in the Austrian comedy series Hochwürden erbt das Paradies.
