= Tony Wegas =

Austrian singer and actor

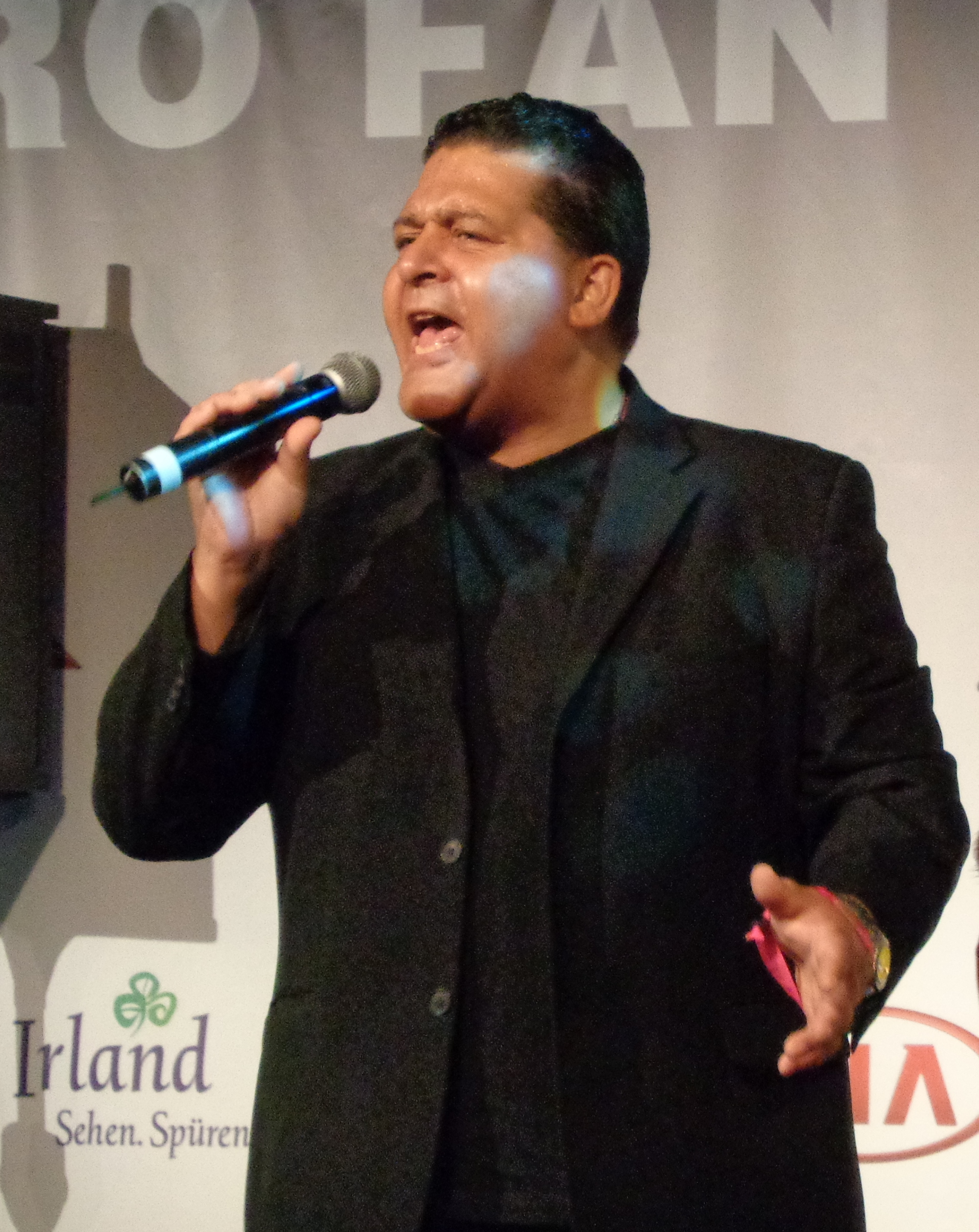
- Wegas performing at Euro Fan Cafe in Vienna, 2015.
- Born: Anton Hans Sarközi; 3 May 1965 (age 61); Oberschützen, Austria
- Occupations: Singer, actor
- Years active: 1990–present

Anton Hans Sarközi, known under his stage name Tony Wegas (born 3 May 1965 in Oberschützen), is an Austrian singer and television actor.

== Biography ==
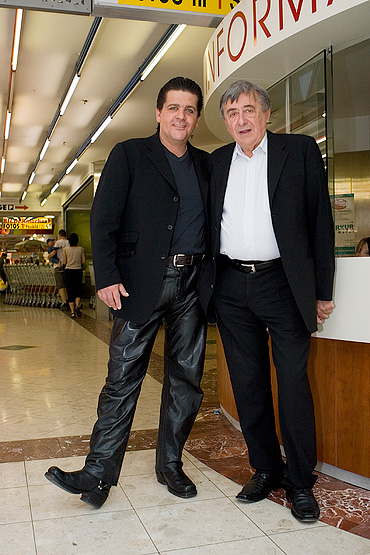
Wegas with entrepreneur Richard Lugner in May 2006

Wegas participated in "Ein Lied für Rom", the Austrian heat of the Eurovision Song Contest in 1991 with the song "Wunder dieser Welt". The song was placed second but Wegas was invited to represent Austria in 1992. He performed "Zusammen geh'n" in Malmö and despite being one of the favourites to win, he finished in tenth place. Austrian television decided to give him another chance in 1993 and he performed all of the songs in the national selection contest, "Veni Vidi Wegas". The winning song, "Maria Magdalena" came fourteenth in Millstreet.

After his Song Contest appearance, he became a regular cast member in the ORF show Tohuwabohu. In 1993 he appeared in the Austrian set comedy series Hochwürden erbt das Paradies.

In the following years Wegas had major problems with alcohol and other drugs and in 1997, he was sentenced to 30 months in prison. In 1999 he published a book about his life, rise and fall, Nüchtern betrachtet (Viewed soberly).

== Discography ==
=== Studio albums ===
List of studio albums, with selected details and peak chart positions
Title	Details	Peak chart positions
Title	Details	AUT
Feuerwerk / Durada Dschal	Released: August 1994; Label: EMI Austria GesmbH (830147 2); Formats: CD, CS	33
... Für Dich	Released: July 1995; Label: EMI Austria (7243 8 34112 2 1); Formats: CD, CS	33

=== Compilations ===
List of compilations, with selected details
Title	Details
The Very Best of Tony Wegas	Released: December 2004; Label: 7243 5 63482 2 6; Formats: CD

== Charted singles ==
List of singles as lead artist, with selected peak chart positions
Title	Year	Peak chart positions
Title	Year	AUT
"Zusammen geh'n"	1992	9
"Maria Magdalena"	1993	33

Preceded by Tony Wegas	Austria in the Eurovision Song Contest; 1993	Succeeded by Petra Frey
Preceded by Thomas Forstner	Austria in the Eurovision Song Contest; 1992	Succeeded by Tony Wegas
