= 6 Richtige =

- Starring: Benno Hoffmann
- Country of origin: West Germany
- No. of episodes: 26

Production
- Running time: 25

Original release
- Release: 1983 – 1984

6 Richtige was a West German sitcom about the life of family "Richtig". It was broadcast between 1983–1984.

== Cast ==
- Corinna Genest as Mother Richtig
- Tana Schanzara as Cleaner
- Benno Hoffmann as Grandpa Richtig
- Peter Nottmeier as Son Helmut Richtig
- Ellen Schulz as Daughter Barbara Richtig
- Horst A. Fechner as Father Richtig
- Dirk Saur as Son Gregor Richtig

== See also ==
- List of German television series
