= Wie gut, dass es Maria gibt =

- Starring: Thekla Carola Wied
- Country of origin: Germany
- No. of seasons: 2
- No. of episodes: 27

Production
- Running time: 45 minutes

Original release
- Release: 25 September 1990

Wie gut, dass es Maria gibt is a German television series.

== See also ==
- List of German television series
