= Theatre (novel) =

1937 novel by W. Somerset Maugham

- First edition (UK)
- Author: William Somerset Maugham
- Language: English
- Publisher: William Heinemann (UK); Doubleday Doran (US)
- Publication date: 1937
- Publication place: United Kingdom
- Media type: Print

Theatre is a novel by the British writer W. Somerset Maugham, first published in 1937 by William Heinemann (UK) and Doubleday Doran (US).

The novel describes a successful actress and her husband, a theatre manager; her life and career is disturbed by a stormy affair with a young accountant.

== Background ==
In the preface to a collected edition, Maugham writes that during the thirty years between the productions of his first play and his last play, he knew "a great number of distinguished actresses. Julia Lambert, the heroine of Theatre, is a portrait of none of them. I have taken a trait here and a trait there and sought to create a living person. Because I was not much affected by the glamour of the brilliant creatures I had known in the flesh I drew the creature of my fancy, I dare say, with a certain coolness. I think Julia is true to life.... I feel a great affection for her; I am not shocked by her naughtiness, nor scandalized by her absurdities...."

== Summary ==
Julia Lambert and Michael Gosselyn first meet when they are both in a theatre company in Liverpool; their relationship grows, and Julia suggests that he try theatre management, with her as leading lady. Michael proposes marriage. Michael, hired by an American manager, is then away for a year; his time in America is not a success. On his return, Julia and Michael marry.

During the First World War Michael is an officer, and regularly returns on leave. Julia is no longer in love with him. They have a baby, Roger.

Dolly de Vries, a rich widow who has a passion for the stage, and for Julia, finances Michael in theatre management. The play they choose, in which Michael is happy to have a small role, is successful; they produce more plays, and buy the lease of a theatre in London. During the next few years Michael becomes complacent, and a bore; Julia becomes rich and successful.

Tom Fennell, an articled clerk with a firm of accountants, is auditing the accounts of Michael's theatre. The couple invites him for a meal at home; Tom later sends flowers to Julia at the theatre, and invites her to tea at his flat. Unexpectedly, the meeting leads to passion. The affair develops, and she buys him presents. He is invited for a fortnight at Julia and Michael's country house; Tom gets on well with Roger, who is a similar age, and Julia is disappointed that Tom spends most of his time with him, not with her; afterwards she sends Tom an insulting letter, but later they make up.

When Roger tells Julia that he and Tom had a couple of girls at Tom's flat, she is disappointed that Roger has grown up. Joan Denver, Roger's seducer, wants to be an understudy in a play, and Julia appraises her, disguising her contempt. Tom takes Julia to see Avice Crichton, whom he knows, in a play: she is beginning her career, and Tom wants her to have a part in Julia's next play. Julia regards her as a pretty but talentless actress; angry that Avice is using Tom to advance her career, she maliciously agrees to have Avice in her play.

She realises how much she still loves Tom, and, performing in her current play, she "put into it now all the agony of her spirit". Michael afterwards says she acted badly, and they decide she should rest for a while; she spends the summer with her mother and aunt in Saint-Malo, France.

During rehearsals for their next play Nowadays in the autumn, Avice Crichton is not good. Julia, to keep her in the play, suggests to Michael that he should help her with her part.

Roger, back from a few weeks in Austria, talks with Julia, unclear about his future. He says he does not know reality, because he has lived in a world of his parents' make-believe; he thinks Julia is nothing apart from her acting.

On the afternoon of the first night of Nowadays Julia goes to Tom's flat, but realises she no longer cares for him. During the play, she outclasses Avice Crichton and kills her performance, ruining Avice's career. Michael thinks it is because he had flirted with Avice. Julia does not go to the first night party, but dines alone at The Berkeley, triumphant. She thinks that actors are real and others are the raw material. "Roger says we don't exist. Why, it's only we who do exist.... They say acting is only make-believe. That make-believe is the only reality."

== Adaptations ==
Theatre was adapted as a play of the same name by Guy Bolton; it was first seen at the Hudson Theatre in New York, and ran for 69 performances, from 12 November 1941 to 10 January 1942. It featured Cornelia Otis Skinner as Julia Lambert and Arthur Margetson as Michael Gosselyn. That adaptation has also been produced as Larger Than Life.

Adorable Julia, a German-language film of 1962 (original title Julia, du bist zauberhaft), was based on the play by Guy Bolton. It was directed by Alfred Weidenmann, and featured Lilli Palmer as Julia and Charles Boyer as Michael.

Teātris (1978), a Latvian film based on the novel, was directed by Jānis Streičs. It featured Vija Artmane as Julia and Gunārs Cilinskis as Michael.

Being Julia (2004), a film directed by István Szabó, was adapted by Ronald Harwood from the novel. It featured Annette Bening as Julia and Jeremy Irons as Michael.
