= Roy Black (singer) =

German singer and actor

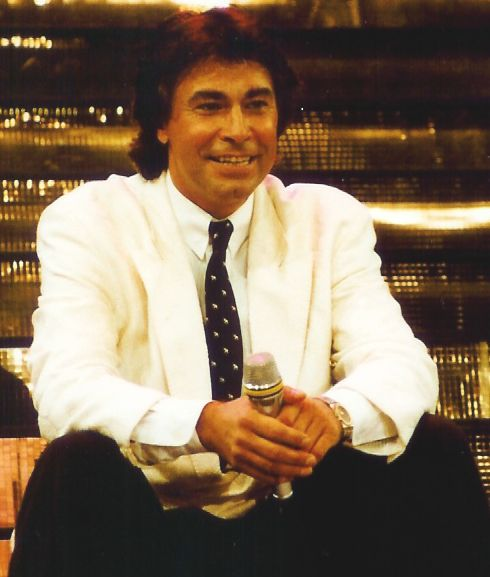

Background information
- Born: Gerhard Höllerich; 25 January 1943; Bobingen, Bavarian Swabia, Germany
- Died: 9 October 1991 (aged 48) Heldenstein, Bavaria, Germany
- Genres: Rock, schlager
- Occupations: Singer; actor
- Instrument: Vocals
- Years active: 1963–1991
- Formerly of: The Honky Tonks; Roy Black and His Cannons; Hans Bertram; Dieter Bohlen; Anita Hegerland

Gerhard Höllerich (25 January 1943 – 9 October 1991), known professionally as Roy Black, was a German schlager singer and actor, who appeared in several musical comedies and starred in the 1989 TV series, Ein Schloß am Wörthersee.

== Biography ==
Born in Bobingen, Bavarian Swabia, Germany, Black attended the Holbein Gymnasium in Augsburg and, aged 20, founded the rock and roll band Roy Black and His Cannons. His stage name derived from his black hair and his idol, Roy Orbison.

Roy Black and His Cannons achieved some local fame and were offered a recording contract with Polydor Records. However, his record producer Hans Bertram decided on a solo career for Black, and a switch to romantic songs for his protégé, a decision which soon led to nationwide fame. In 1966, his single "Ganz in Weiß"—a romantic song about marrying in white—sold in excess of one million copies by the end of 1967. His 1969 song "Dein schönstes Geschenk", sold one million copies by May 1970, having spent nine weeks at number one in the German chart.

From 1967, Black also took on roles in several musical comedy films, for example in the 1969 movie Help, I Love Twins opposite Uschi Glas.

In 1974, Black announced his engagement to model Silke Vagts (1945–2002), and the couple got married in Munich the same year. In 1976 their son Torsten was born. They divorced in 1985.

Six years later, Black died of heart failure in combination with an increased alcohol level, in Heldenstein near Mühldorf am Inn.

In 1996 the television film You Are Not Alone: The Roy Black Story was produced, starring Christoph Waltz as Roy Black.

There is a small monument to Black in Velden am Wörthersee, Austria. During the night of 18 September 2020 the monument, which had been renewed a few days earlier, was stolen by still unknown perpetrators. On 22 September 2020 the bust, which had been stolen, turned up in the garden of an inn in Velden.

== Discography ==
- 1966 - Roy Black
- 1967 - Roy Black 2
- 1968 - Ich denk' an Dich
- 1969 - Ich hab' Dich lieb
- 1969 - Concerto d'amour
- 1970 - Im Land der Lieder
- 1970 - Für Dich allein
- 1971 - Wo bist Du?
- 1971 - Eine Liebesgeschichte
- 1972 - Träume in Samt und Seele
- 1972 - Wunderbar ist die Welt
- 1973 - Grün ist die Heide
- 1973 - Hier und mit Dir
- 1974 - Roy Black und die Fischer-Chöre (with the Fischer-Chöre)
- 1976 - Liebe, wie sie Dir gefällt
- 1978 - Neue Lieder
- 1986 - Herzblut
- 1988 - Schwarz auf weiß
- 1989 - Ein Hauch von Sinnlichkeit
- 1990 - Zeit für Zärtlichkeit
- 1991 - Rosenzeit

== Awards ==
- 1966: Bravo Otto in silver
- 1967: Bravo Otto in gold
- 1968: Bravo Otto in gold
- 1968: Goldene Europa
- 1969: Bravo Otto in gold
- 1970: Bravo Otto in gold
- 1970: Goldene Europa
- 1971: Bravo Otto in silver
- 1971: Goldene Europa
- 1972: Bravo Otto in bronze
- 1972: Krawattenmann des Jahres
- 1980: Hermann-Löns-Medaille
- 1981: Goldene Stimmgabel
- 1984: Goldene Stimmgabel
- 1989: Goldene Stimmgabel
- 1990: Goldene Stimmgabel

== Selected filmography ==
- Paradies der flotten Sünder (1968), as Nick Dreamer
- Always Trouble with the Teachers (with Uschi Glas, 1968), as Peter Hartung
- Our Doctor is the Best (with Helga Anders, 1969), as Dr. Leonhard Sommer
- Help, I Love Twins (with Uschi Glas, 1969), as Andy Hard
- When You're With Me (with Zienia Merton, 1970), as Chris Bergen
- Who Laughs Last, Laughs Best (with Uschi Glas, 1971), as Robby Mertens
- Wenn mein Schätzchen auf die Pauke haut (with Uschi Glas, 1971), as Kristian Wernher
- The Reverend Turns a Blind Eye (with Uschi Glas, 1971), as Michael Springer
- Kinderarzt Dr. Fröhlich (with Heidi Hansen, 1972), as Dr. Hannes Fröhlich
- The Heath Is Green (with Monika Lundi, 1972), as Norbert
- Old Barge, Young Love (with Barbara Nielsen, 1973), as Mark Tanner
- Schwarzwaldfahrt aus Liebeskummer (with Barbara Nielsen and Heidi Hansen, 1974), as Hannes Cremer
- Ein Schloß am Wörthersee (1990–1991, TV series, 21 episodes), as Lennie Berger
