= Sissy Löwinger =

Austrian actress, director and theatre manager

- Born: Cäcilia Löwinger; 22 June 1941; Graz, Nazi Germany
- Died: 25 September 2011 (aged 70); Altlengbach, Austria
- Occupation(s): Actress, director, theatre manager
- Years active: 1960–2011
- Spouse(s): Rudi Grimas (?-1965) (divorced) 1 child Herbert Hisel (1969-1972) (divorced); Peter Rapp (1977-1985) (divorced); Peter Blechinger (2001-2011) (her death)

Sissy Löwinger (22 June 1941 – 25 September 2011) was an Austrian actress, director and theatre manager. She was the daughter of Austrian actors Liesl and Paul Löwinger. She worked in public relations and dramaturgy for the family theatre "Löwinger Bühne" together with her brother, Paul. Later she also directed plays. After her father's death she became manager of the theatre, again with her brother Paul. She directed and edited television comedies and also wrote eight plays. She appeared in the role of Walpurga in the Franz Josef Gottlieb directed German production of Saison in Salzburg (1961).

She was married to the very popular Austrian television presenter Peter Rapp, and later to Peter Blechinger, with whom she lived in a house in Neulengbach in Austria. Löwinger had a daughter from her first marriage.

Löwinger died on 25 September 2011 in Altlengbach, Lower Austria as a consequence of pulmonary embolism. She was 70.

== Director ==
- 1983: Ein Mann für zwei Frauen
- 1985: Der keusche Joseph

== Selected filmography ==
- Season in Salzburg (1951)
- Don't Fool with Me (1963)
- Das ist mein Wien (1965)
- Our Doctor is the Best (1969)
- Always Trouble with the Teachers (1968)
- Naughty Roommates (a.k.a. Wild, Willing & Sexy, 1969)
- House of Pleasure (1969)
- The Brazen Women of Balzac (a.k.a. Sex Is a Pleasure, 1969)
- Frau Wirtin treibt es jetzt noch toller (The Hostess Exceeds All Bounds, 1970)
- No Sin on the Alpine Pastures (1974)
