= No Sin on the Alpine Pastures (1974 film) =

1974 film by Franz Josef Gottlieb

- Directed by: Franz Josef Gottlieb
- Written by: Hubert Frank
- Produced by: Günther Eulau
- Starring: Alena Penz; Alexander Grill; Rinaldo Talamonti
- Cinematography: Heinz Hölscher
- Edited by: Christine Leyrer
- Music by: Gerhard Heinz
- Production company: Lisa Film
- Distributed by: Constantin Film
- Release date: 11 October 1974
- Running time: 81 minutes
- Country: West Germany
- Language: German

No Sin on the Alpine Pastures (German: Auf der Alm da gibt's koa Sünd) is a 1974 West German comedy film directed by Franz Josef Gottlieb and starring Alena Penz, Alexander Grill and Rinaldo Talamonti. It is part of the cycle of Bavarian sex comedies made during the era Location shooting took place in Austria.

== Cast ==
- Alena Penz as Sally
- Alexander Grill as Josef Sandler
- Rinaldo Talamonti as Tino
- Alexander Miller as Heiner
- Eva Garden as Claudia
- Sissy Löwinger as Anna Sandler
- Gerd Eichen as Sepp Huber, Wirt
- Erhard 'Bimbo' Weller as Emil
- Jürgen Schilling as Lois
- Walter Feuchtenberg as Prof. Solo
- Joanna Jung as Zenzi
- Elisabeth Felchner as Kuhhirtin
- Hans Terofal as Xaver, Gendarm
- Ulrich Beiger as Arzt
- Otto Retzer as Pferdekutscher
- Gerry Thiele as Apotheker
- Heinz Gerstl as Bursche auf Volksfest
- Walter Klinger as Franz
- Gudrun Velisek as Frau vom Sittlichkeitsverein

== Bibliography ==
- Gabriele Eichmanns & Yvonne Franke. Heimat Goes Mobile: Hybrid Forms of Home in Literature and Film. Cambridge Scholars Publishing, 2013.
