= Ich heirate eine Familie =

- Genre: comedy drama
- Created by: Curth Flatow
- Starring: Thekla Carola Wied; Peter Weck; Julia Biedermann; Timmo Niesner; Tarek Helmy; Maria Sebaldt; Herbert Bötticher; Bruni Löbel
- Country of origin: West Germany
- No. of seasons: 4
- No. of episodes: 14

Original release
- Network: ZDF
- Release: 3 November 1983 – 27 December 1987

Ich heirate eine Familie (I am marrying a family) is a television series that aired from 1983 to 1986 on German television network ZDF. 14 episodes were produced.

Curth Flatow wrote the screenplays, while all episodes were directed by Peter Weck. The show's music is composed by Alain Goraguer.

The divorced Angelika "Angie" Graf (Thekla Carola Wied) lives with her three children, teenage daughter Tanja (Julia Biedermann) and younger sons Markus and Tom, in West Berlin, where she runs a small children's boutique.

Her friends Sybille "Bille" (Maria Sebaldt) and Alfons Vonhoff (Herbert Bötticher) are convinced that Angie needs a new man in her life. Thus, they try to pair her off with Vienna-born commercial artist Werner Schumann (Peter Weck), a divorcee himself, who is watched over by his curious and jealous housekeeper Mrs. Raabe (Bruni Löbel).

Bille and Alfons' idea first does not work out when Werner unexpectedly shows up with his current girlfriend at the party they organize to bring Angie and Werner together.

However, Angie and Werner get to know each other and end up secretly dating, but Werner does not know about Angie's children at first.

The screenplay includes strong, ironic dialogues and ensures some slapstick, above all the character of Werner with his Viennesse charm is a pillar of the story.

In contrast to Schumanns' happy relationship is the dysfunctional marriage of Bille and Alfons.

Flatow processed autobiographical experiences in his script after himself marrying a woman with several children. The role of Werner was originally given to Harald Juhnke with Peter Weck only directing, but Juhnke's alcoholism caused the producers to cast Weck as leading character.
