= Help, I Love Twins =

1969 film

- Directed by: Peter Weck
- Written by: August Rieger
- Produced by: Karl Spiehs
- Starring: Roy Black; Uschi Glas; Eddi Arent
- Cinematography: Kurt Junek
- Edited by: Arnfried Heyne
- Music by: Gerhard Heinz; Werner Twardy
- Production companies: Divina-Film; Lisa Film
- Distributed by: Gloria Film
- Release date: 21 November 1969
- Running time: 84 minutes
- Country: West Germany
- Language: German

Help, I Love Twins (German: Hilfe, ich liebe Zwillinge) is a 1969 West German comedy film directed by Peter Weck and starring Roy Black, Uschi Glas, and Eddi Arent.

It was shot around Wörthersee in Austria.

== Synopsis ==
A budding photographer receives an assignment to photograph a top model while she on holiday. Confusingly, however, her twin sister works at the hotel where she is staying.

== Cast ==
- Roy Black as Andy
- Uschi Glas as Hanna / Renate
- Eddi Arent as Mr. Brown
- Ernst Stankovski as Ziborius
- Angelica Ott as Sheila Garrett
- Walter Buschhoff as Busebius
- Viktor Staal as Dr. Peters
- Alfred Böhm as Gendarm
- Johann Sklenka as Hieronymus Zipfl
- Renate Heuer as Susanne
- Dieter Kaiser as Klaus
- Georg Thomalla as Onkel Fritz

== Bibliography ==
- Bock, Hans-Michael; Bergfelder, Tim, eds. (2009). The Concise Cinegraph: Encyclopaedia of German Cinema. New York: Berghahn Books. ISBN 978-1-57181-655-9.
