= Full Hearts and Empty Pockets =

1964 film directed by Camillo Mastrocinque

- Directed by: Camillo Mastrocinque
- Written by: Franz Antel; Edoardo Anton; Kurt Nachmann; Otto Roskowitz
- Produced by: Franz Antel; Giuliano Simonetti
- Starring: Thomas Fritsch; Alexandra Stewart; Gino Cervi; Senta Berger
- Cinematography: Riccardo Pallottini
- Edited by: Adolf Schlyssleder
- Music by: Ennio Morricone
- Production companies: Geosfilm; Löwant-Film
- Distributed by: Bavaria Film
- Release date: 27 February 1964
- Running time: 88 minutes
- Countries: Italy; West Germany
- Language: German

Full Hearts and Empty Pockets (German: Volles Herz und leere Taschen, Italian: ...e la donna creò l'uomo) is a 1964 Italian-West German comedy film directed by Camillo Mastrocinque and starring Thomas Fritsch, Alexandra Stewart, Gino Cervi and Senta Berger. It was shot at the Bavaria Studios in Munich with some location shooting in Rome. The film's sets were designed by the art director Hertha Hareiter. It premiered at the Marmorhaus in West Berlin.

== Synopsis ==
Rik, a young German arrives penniless in Rome and enjoys a series of successes, both in business and with various attractive woman he enocunters.

== Cast ==
- Thomas Fritsch as Rik
- Alexandra Stewart as Laura
- Gino Cervi as Botta
- Senta Berger as Jane
- Linda Christian as Minelli
- Claudio Gora as Matarassi
- Françoise Rosay as Borgia
- Massimo Serato as Chefredakteur
- Helga Lehner as Sabine
- Margaret Rose Keil as Giulia
- Stelvio Rosi as Enzo Turco
- Dominique Boschero as Elga
- Odoardo Spadaro as Kutscher
- Silvana Jachino as la proprietaria della pensione
- Attilio Dottesio as il direttore dell'albergo
- Manfred Spies as Luigi

== Bibliography ==
- Bock, Hans-Michael & Bergfelder, Tim. The Concise CineGraph. Encyclopedia of German Cinema. Berghahn Books, 2009.
- Sciannameo, Franco. Reflections on the Music of Ennio Morricone: Fame and Legacy. Lexington Books, 2020.
