= Adorable Julia =

1962 film by Alfred Weidenmann

- Austrian theatrical release poster
- German: Julia, du bist zauberhaft
- Directed by: Alfred Weidenmann
- Screenplay by: Johanna Sibelius; Eberhard Keindorff; Guy Bolton (Note: French version); Marc-Gilbert Sauvajon; Pascal Jardin (Note: Dialogue; French version)
- Based on: Theatre by W. Somerset Maugham
- Produced by: Rudolf Stering; Alf Teichs
- Starring: Lilli Palmer; Charles Boyer; Jean Sorel; Jeanne Valérie; Charles Régnier; Ljuba Welitsch; Thomas Fritsch; Tilly Lauenstein
- Cinematography: Werner Krien
- Edited by: Renate Jelinek
- Music by: Rolf A. Wilhelm
- Production companies: Production de l'Etoile; Wiener Mundus-Film
- Distributed by: Constantin Film (West Germany); Société nouvelle de cinématographie (France)
- Release dates: May 1962 (Cannes); June 1962 (France); 10 August 1962 (West Germany)
- Running time: 97 minutes
- Countries: Austria; France
- Language: German

Adorable Julia (German: Julia, du bist zauberhaft, lit. 'Julia, You Are Magical') is a 1962 comedy film directed by Alfred Weidenmann from a screenplay by Johanna Sibelius and Eberhard Keindorff, based on the 1937 novel Theatre by W. Somerset Maugham. The film stars Lilli Palmer, Charles Boyer and Jean Sorel. It was entered into the 1962 Cannes Film Festival.

The sets were designed by art director Leo Metzenbauer. The film was partly shot on location in London. It was made with the backing of the German Constantin Film, which produced a number of Austrian films during the period.

== Cast ==
- Lilli Palmer as Julia Lambert
- Charles Boyer as Michael Grosselyn
- Jean Sorel as Tom Fennel
- Jeanne Valérie as Avice Crichton
- Ljuba Welitsch as Dolly de Fries
- Tilly Lauenstein as Evie, Julia's maid
- Charles Régnier as Lord Charles Tamerly
- Thomas Fritsch as Roger, Julia's son
- Herbert Fux as stage manager
- Hanna Ehrenstrasser as a long-legged girl
- Gustaf Elger as Stevenson, author
- Sylvia Lydi as Frl. Philipps, massagist
- Friedrich Neubauer as Sir Edwin, famous pianist
- Fritz Puchstein as Edwards, servant for the Gosselyns
- Herta Risawy as Margary, Michael's secretary
- Peter Schmidberger as Charly Dexter, Julia's stage partner
- Otto Schmöle as Albert, chauffeur for the Gosselyns
- Fritz Weiss as Mr. Robinson, banker
