= Uschi Glas =

German actress and singer

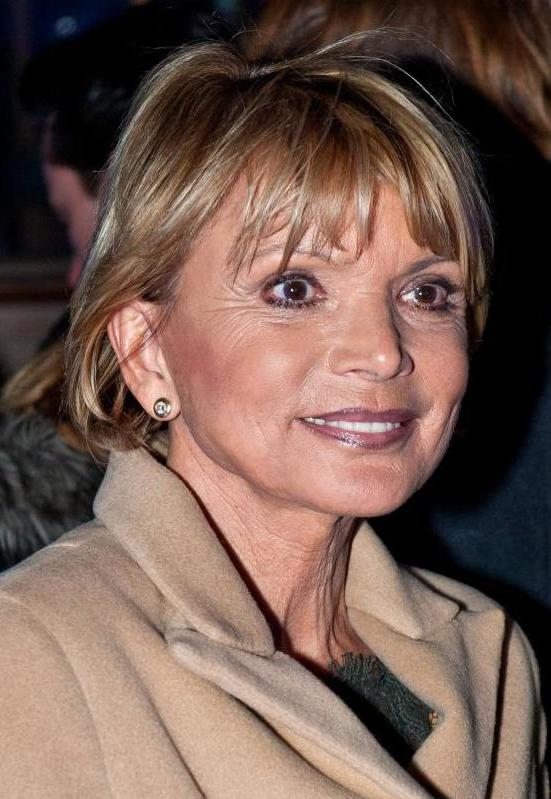
- Glas in 2012
- Born: Helga Ursula Glas; 2 March 1944 (age 82); Landau an der Isar, München–Oberbayern, Germany
- Occupations: Actress, singer
- Years active: 1965–present
- Spouses: Bernd Tewaag (m. 1981–2003) Dieter Hermann (m. 2005)

Helga Ursula "Uschi" Glas (German pronunciation: [ˈʊʃi ˈɡlaːs]; born 2 March 1944), sometimes credited as Ursula Glas, is a German actress in film, television, and on stage, and a singer.

== Biography ==
The youngest of 4 children, she was born in Landau an der Isar, Bavaria in 1944 to parents Christian Glas and Josefine Kratzer Glas. Her father was a member of the Nazi party since 1931, and a member of the Waffen SS since 1944.

She started appearing in films in 1965. Her breakthrough role was that of Barbara in the unconventional 1968 movie Go for It, Baby (Zur Sache, Schätzchen), which captured the spirit of the times in that it presented youthful protest against the German establishment and hinted at the loosening of morals in the wake of the sexual revolution. From then on, the tabloid press would refer to Glas frequently as Schätzchen (German pronunciation: [ˈʃɛt͡sçən]).

In the late '60s and early '70s, Glas appeared in many slapstick movies, notably in three films of the seven-part series (1967–72) Die Lümmel von der ersten Bank (The Brats on the Front Bench Row). She made five comedy films opposite singer Roy Black.

In the 1980s and 1990s Glas concentrated on her television work, appearing in a succession of TV series tailored to her person, playing, among other characters, a veterinarian in Tierärztin Christine (1993), an energetic businesswoman in Anna Maria – Eine Frau geht ihren Weg (Anna Maria - A Woman goes her Way, 1995-1996), and the ideal teacher in Sylvia – Eine Klasse für sich (Sylvia - A Class of her own, 1998-2000). She also appeared in many feature-length made-for-TV movies. In total, Glas appeared in more than 75 film and TV productions.

Glas was married to the film producer Bernd Tewaag from 1981 until their divorce in 2003; they had three children. In 2005, Glas married the business consultant Dieter Herrmann. She is now the step-mother to Sophie Hermann, a social media influencer and fashion designer who appears in the UK reality TV series Made in Chelsea.

In 2004, Glas published a memoir, Mit einem Lächeln (With a Smile).

== Selected filmography ==
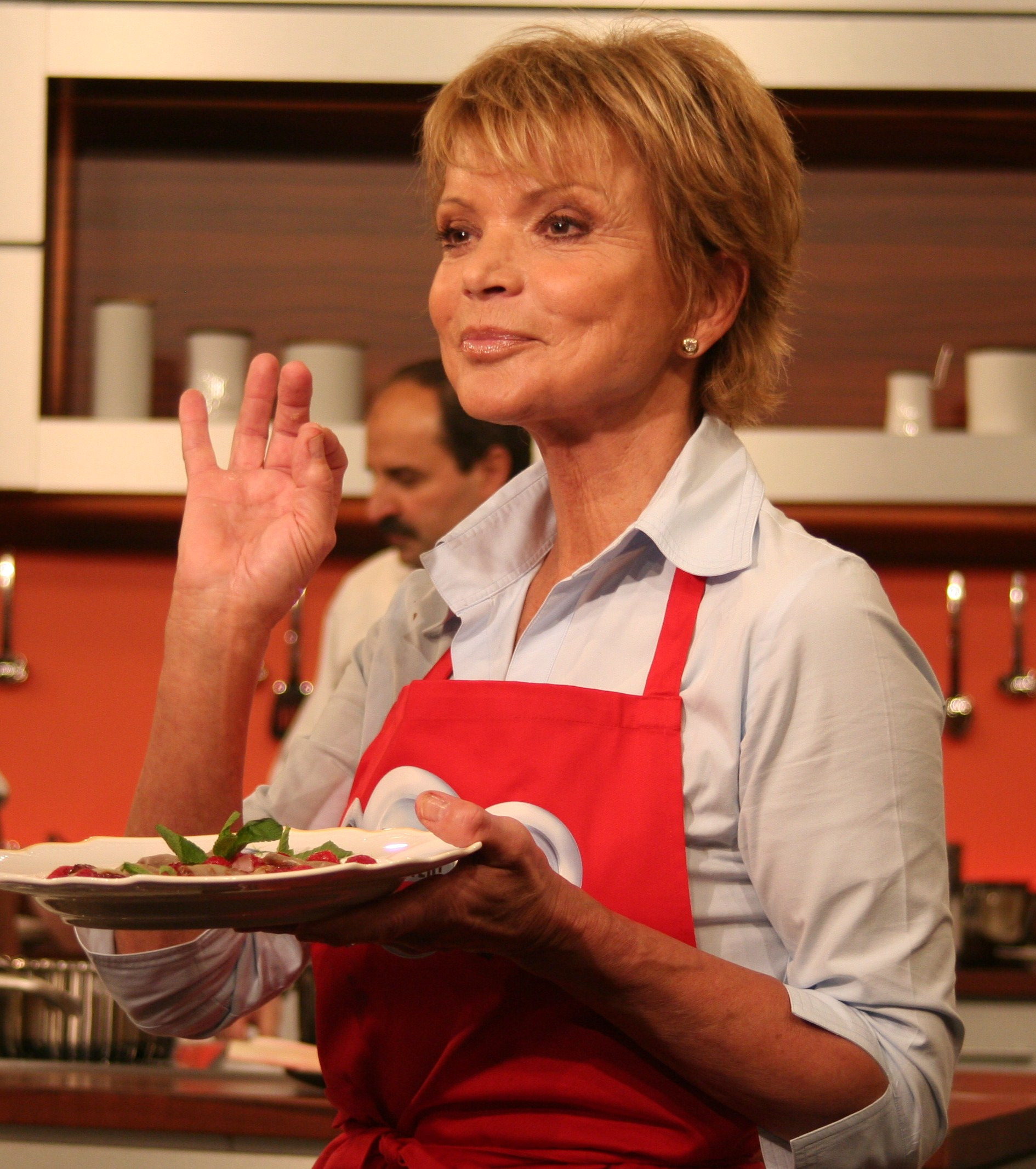
Glas in 2010

- The Sinister Monk (1965)
- Winnetou and the Crossbreed (1966)
- The College Girl Murders (1967)
- The Great Happiness (1967)
- Go for It, Baby (1968)
- The Gorilla of Soho (1968)
- Zur Hölle mit den Paukern (1968)
- Always Trouble with the Teachers (1968)
- Tower of Screaming Virgins (1968)
- Klassenkeile (1969)
- Pepe, der Paukerschreck (1969)
- That Guy Loves Me, Am I Supposed to Believe That? (1969)
- Help, I Love Twins (1969)
- We'll Take Care of the Teachers (1970)
- Hurra, unsere Eltern sind nicht da (1970)
- Die Feuerzangenbowle (1970)
- The Females (1970)
- Nachbarn sind zum Ärgern da (1970)
- The Body in the Thames (1971)
- Who Laughs Last, Laughs Best (1971)
- Wir hau'n den Hauswirt in die Pfanne (1971)
- Black Beauty (1971)
- Hilfe, die Verwandten kommen (1971)
- Wenn mein Schätzchen auf die Pauke haut (1971)
- Holidays in Tyrol (1971)
- The Reverend Turns a Blind Eye (1971)
- Seven Blood-Stained Orchids (1972)
- Don't Get Angry (1972)
- The Merry Quartet from the Filling Station (1972)
- Alleluja & Sartana are Sons... Sons of God (1972)
- Trouble with Trixie (1972)
- Le Tueur (1972)
- Der Kommissar, episode "Ein Mädchen nachts auf der Straße" (1973, TV)
- Ich denk' mich tritt ein Pferd (1975)
- Derrick, season 3, episode 3: "Angst" (1976, TV)
- Polizeiinspektion 1 (1977–1988, TV series)
- Waldrausch (1977)
- Die Kette (1977, TV film)
- The Old Fox, episode "Ein Koffer" (1978, TV)
- Unsere schönsten Jahre (1983–1985, TV series)
- Mama Mia – Don't Panic (1984)
- Zwei Münchner in Hamburg (1989–1993, TV series)
- Ein Schloß am Wörthersee (1991–1993, TV series)
- Veterinarian Christine (1993, TV film)
- Anna Maria – Eine Frau geht ihren Weg (1994–1997, TV series)
- Veterinarian Christine II: The Temptation (1995, TV film)
- Delayed Exposure (1997, TV film)
- Sylvia – Eine Klasse für sich (1998–2000, TV series)
- Zwei am großen See (2004–2006, TV series)
- Der Winzerkrieg (2011, TV film)
- Fack ju Göhte (2013)
- Fack ju Göhte 2 (2015)
- Fack ju Göhte 3 (2017)
- Club der einsamen Herzen (2019, TV film)

== Awards ==
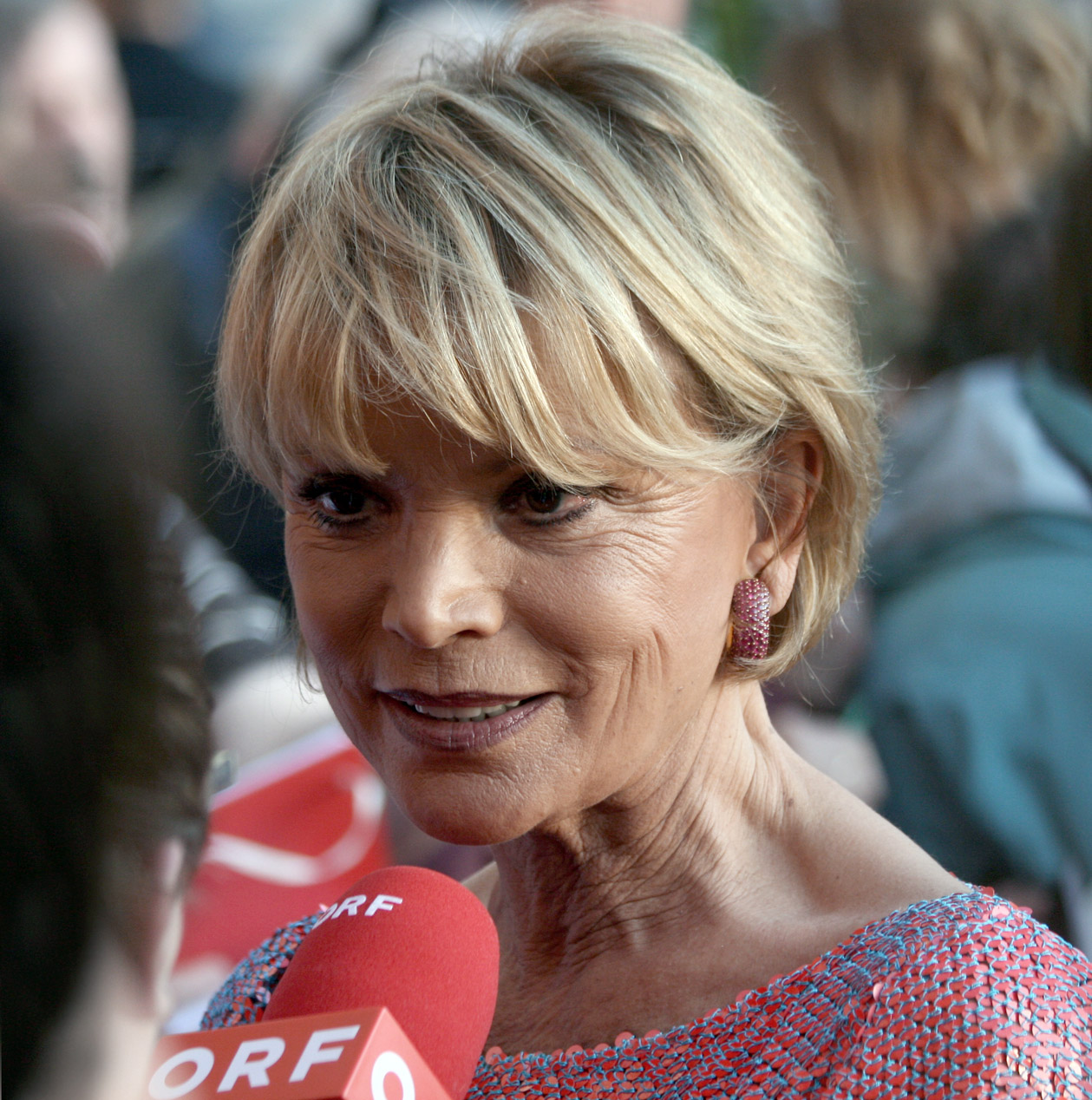
Glas in 2012

Film industry awards

- Bravo Otto in Bronze: 1967, 1976
- Bravo Otto in Silver: 1974, 1977
- Bravo Otto in Gold: 1969, 1970, 1971, 1972 (twice), 1973
- Bambi: 1969, 1990
- Romy: 1990 (as a Popular Actress), 1992 and 1993 (as a Favored Series Star)
- Goldene Kamera: 1984 (Best TV camera favorite female – 3rd place HÖRZU reader poll), 1990 (Most Popular Actress Series – 1st place HÖRZU reader poll), 1995 (Best Actress)
- Bavarian Television Award Honorary Award 1995
- Golden Gong 1997 and 1998

Other awards

- 1992: Bavarian Order of Merit
- 1997: Austrian Cross of Honor for Science and Art
- 1998: Merit Cross 1st Class of the Federal Republic of Germany (Verdienstkreuz 1. Klasse)
- 1999: Courage Award
- 2005: Brilliant Brisant for her social commitment
- 2008: Bavarian Beer Order
