= Anna Maria – Eine Frau geht ihren Weg =

- Also known as: Anna Maria – A Woman Follows Her Path
- Starring: Uschi Glas; Kevin Dawson; Saskia Preil; Eva Kotthaus; Toni Berger; Siegfried Lowitz; Christian Kohlund; Kathe Loaisa; Elisabeth Blonzen; Franjo Marincic; Matin Trattau; Mohand Ali-Yahia; Bastian Manuael; Barbara Dumba; Tatjana Blacher; Claus Brockmeyer; Reinhard Glemnitz; Ruth Hausmeister; Wilfried Pucher; Karin Rasenack; Christian Schmidt; Martin Semmelrogge; Volker Spahr; Josef Thalmeier; Klaus-Peter Thiele; Barbara Weinzier; Kurt Weinzierl; Monika Woytowicz; Hans Wyprächtiger
- Country of origin: Germany
- No. of seasons: 3
- No. of episodes: 33

Original release
- Network: Sat.1
- Release: 17 October 1994 – 13 January 1997

Anna Maria – Eine Frau geht ihren Weg (Anna Maria – A Woman Follows Her Path) was a German drama television series broadcast between 1994 and 1997 on Sat.1 in 29 episodes. Uschi Glas provided a summary by the series, and claimed to have written the screenplay. The series revolved around Uschi Glas, playing an energetic widow of a gravel pit owner Hannes Seeberger (Michael Degen) who is forced to bring up her children Patricia and Manuel alone and face bankruptcy with her husband's company.

== See also ==
- List of German television series
