= Renate Muhri =

German television actress (born 1951)

- Born: 24 July 1951 (age 74); Germany
- Occupation: actress
- Years active: 1977-

Renate Muhri (born 24 July 1951) is a German television actress.

She has made nearly 30 appearances mostly in television since 1977. In 1993 she appeared in the Austrian set comedy series Hochwürden erbt das Paradies. Her last performance was in Sommernachtstod in 2003.
