= Dracula Blows His Cool =

1979 West German film

- Poster for 1983 English-dubbed version
- Directed by: Carl Schenkel
- Written by: Erich Tomek
- Starring: Gianni Garko; Betty Vergès
- Cinematography: Heinz Hölscher
- Edited by: Jutta Hering
- Music by: Gerhard Heinz
- Production companies: Lisa-Film; Barthonia Film; P.E.I.A.C.
- Distributed by: Residenz Film
- Release date: 1979
- Running time: 93 minutes
- Country: West Germany
- Language: German

Graf Dracula in Oberbayern (English: Count Dracula in Upper Bavaria), also known as Dracula Blows His Cool, is a 1979 West German sex comedy horror film directed by Carl Schenkel. It stars Gianni Garko as Count Stanislaus, a descendent of the vampire Count Dracula, who works as a photographer of erotic models.

The film was released in West Germany in 1979. An English-dubbed version of the film was released in the United States in 1983.

== Cast ==
- Gianni Garko as Stan / Count Stanislaus
- Betty Vergès as Countess Olivia
- Bea Fiedler as Mausi
- Ralf Wolter as Boris
- Giacomo Rizzo as Mario
- Ellen Umlauf as Ellen van Helsing
- Alexander Grill as Burgomaster
- Linda Grondier as Linda
- Tobias Meister as Leopold
- Herta Worell as Old Countess
