= Blankenese (TV series) =

- Country of origin: Germany

Blankenese is a 1994 German television series, which originally aired on ARD. The series focused on the Nicholaisons, a fictional ship owning family located in Blankenese, Hamburg.

== Casts ==
- Hans Quest: Nikolas Nicholaison
- Ursula Lingen: Ellen Nicholaison
- Gisela Trowe: Martha Nicholaison
- Edwin Noël: Klaus Nicholaison
- Philipp Moog: Eric Nicholaison
- Astrid Meyer-Gossler: Elgte Nicholaison
- Till Demtrøder: Patrick Nicholaison
- Wolfgang Völz: Sven Neddelbeck
- Stephan Orlac: Uwe Jensen
- Beate Finck: Therese Jensen
- Antje Hagen: Ilona Neddelbeck
- Till Demtrøder: Patrick Nicholaison
- Fabian Harloff: Horst ‚Hümmelken‘ Neddelbeck
- Lisa Martinek: Tina Neddelbeck
- Klaus Höhne: Larsen
- Gerda Gmelin: Hedwig
- Agnes Dünneisen: Elisabeth
- Ilse Seemann: Helenka Pribasek
- Jürgen Thormann: Heinrich Osberg
- Beate Finckh: Therese Jensen
- Julia Biedermann: Ulrike von Adlersdorf
- Evelyn Opela: Caroline von Greifenstein
- Jean-Pierre Le Roy: Arzt Sanatorium

== See also ==
- List of German television series
