= Dinah Grace =

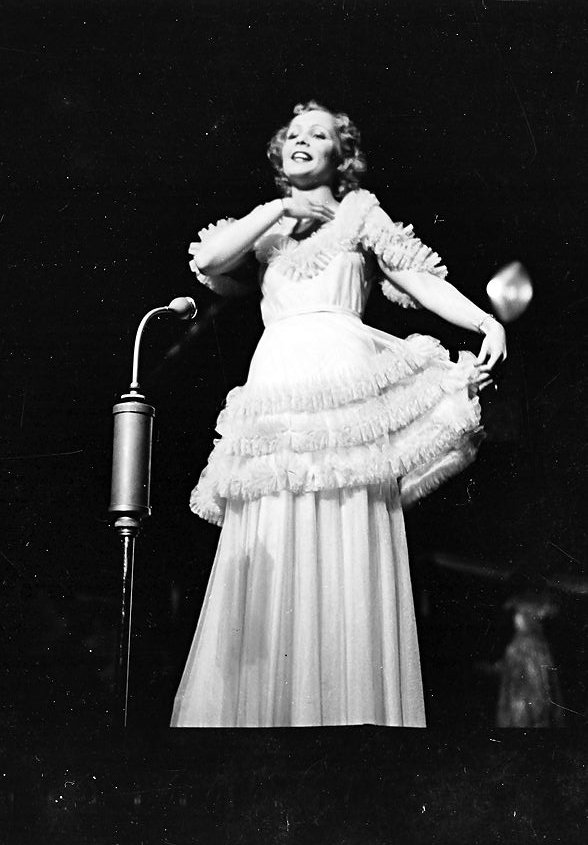
Dinah Grace at the Scala Variety Theater in Berlin, 1936

Dinah Grace (February 14, 1916 – May 10, 1963) was a German dancer and actor.

== Life and work ==
Born in 1916 in Berlin as Käthe Gerda Johanna Ilse Schmidt, Grace was the third daughter of Captain Erich Schmidt, military officer, and his wife Helene. She began ballet lessons at age 11, and at age 14, she appeared in her first ballet. She performed at the Volksbühne Berlin, the Berlin Wintergarten theatre and at the Scala Variety Theater in Berlin. Grace also performed in London, Vienna, Prague and Budapest. Lotte Jacobi described Grace as the greatest dancer she had ever photographed.

In her film debut, Grace appeared as a dancer in the 1933/1934 feature film It's Nice to Be in Love, and in the 1934 film The Secret of Cavelli. In 1936, she appeared as Dolly, a revue dancer, in the short film Potpourri. In March 1937, she married film actor Willy Fritsch, whose co-star Lilian Harvey was among the wedding guests. Grace's final film appearance was in Spassvögel, 1939.

In 1937, Grace, Frisch and their two sons moved to Hamburg. Their son Thomas Fritsch was also an actor. Grace died of breast cancer in 1963, aged 47. She is buried at the Ohlsdorf Cemetery in Hamburg.

== Filmography ==
- 1933/1934: It's Nice to Be in Love (dancer)
- 1934: The Secret of Cavelli (dancer)
- 1936: Potpourri (Dolly, a revue dancer)
- 1939: Spaßvögel (Settchen Strobel)
