= Rivalen der Rennbahn =

German television series

- Genre: Family
- Starring: Thomas Fritsch; Jutta Speidel; Manfred Zapatka; Maja Maranow; Margot Hielscher; Hellmut Lange; Ilse Werner; Hans Clarin; Radost Bokel; Thekla Carola Wied
- Composer: Dieter Bohlen
- Original language: German
- No. of episodes: 11

Production
- Production location: Germany
- Running time: 45

Original release
- Release: 30 March 1989

Rivalen Der Rennbahn is a German television series that aired in 1989, with a total of eleven episodes. It was directed by Stefan Bartmann.

== Plot ==
Successful jockey Christian Adler mysteriously falls off his horse and is injured so badly that he has to end his active career. Countess Louise Hayn-Hohenstein tries to use his knowledge and experience and offers Christian the management of her stable, together with the previous director Wolf Kremer. Business goes well initially, especially when the well-known horse owner Hans-Otto Gruber gives the stable four horses for training. Personal histories clash, however, and a brutal game of intrigue in the field of equestrian sports begins.

== Cast and characters ==
- Thomas Fritsch as Christian Adler
- Jutta Speidel as Monika Adler
- Manfred Zapatka as Hans-Otto Gruber
- Maja Maranow as Sylvia Gruber
- Margot Hielscher as Louise Gräfin Hayn-Hohenstein
- Hellmut Lange as Wolf Kremer
- Ilse Werner as Tante Ella
- Hans Clarin as Rolf Lesch
- Radost Bokel as Margit Franke
- Santiago Ziesmer as Ludger
- Zacharias Preen as Klaus
- Tilly Lauenstein as Rosalinde von Rödermark
- Ferdy Mayne as Emanuel von Rödermark
- Thekla Carola Wied as Thea Waasing
- Winfried Glatzeder as Georg Waasing
- Ursula Karven as Jeannette

== Soundtrack ==
1. Countdown G.T.O. – Rivalen der Rennbahn
2. Nino de Angelo – Samuraj
3. Les McKeown – It's a Game (Long Version)
4. Marianne Rosenberg – I Need Your Love Tonight
5. Countdown G.T.O – Magic Race (Long Version)
6. Ricky Shayne – Once I'm Gonna Stay Forever
7. Blue System – Love Suite
8. Ann Turner – I'm Your Lady
9. Nino de Angelo – Don't Kill It Carol
10. Countdown G.T.O. – Samuraj (Instrumental)
11. Countdown G.T.O. – Rivalen der Rennbahn – Reprise
