= Harald Vock =

German television producer and director

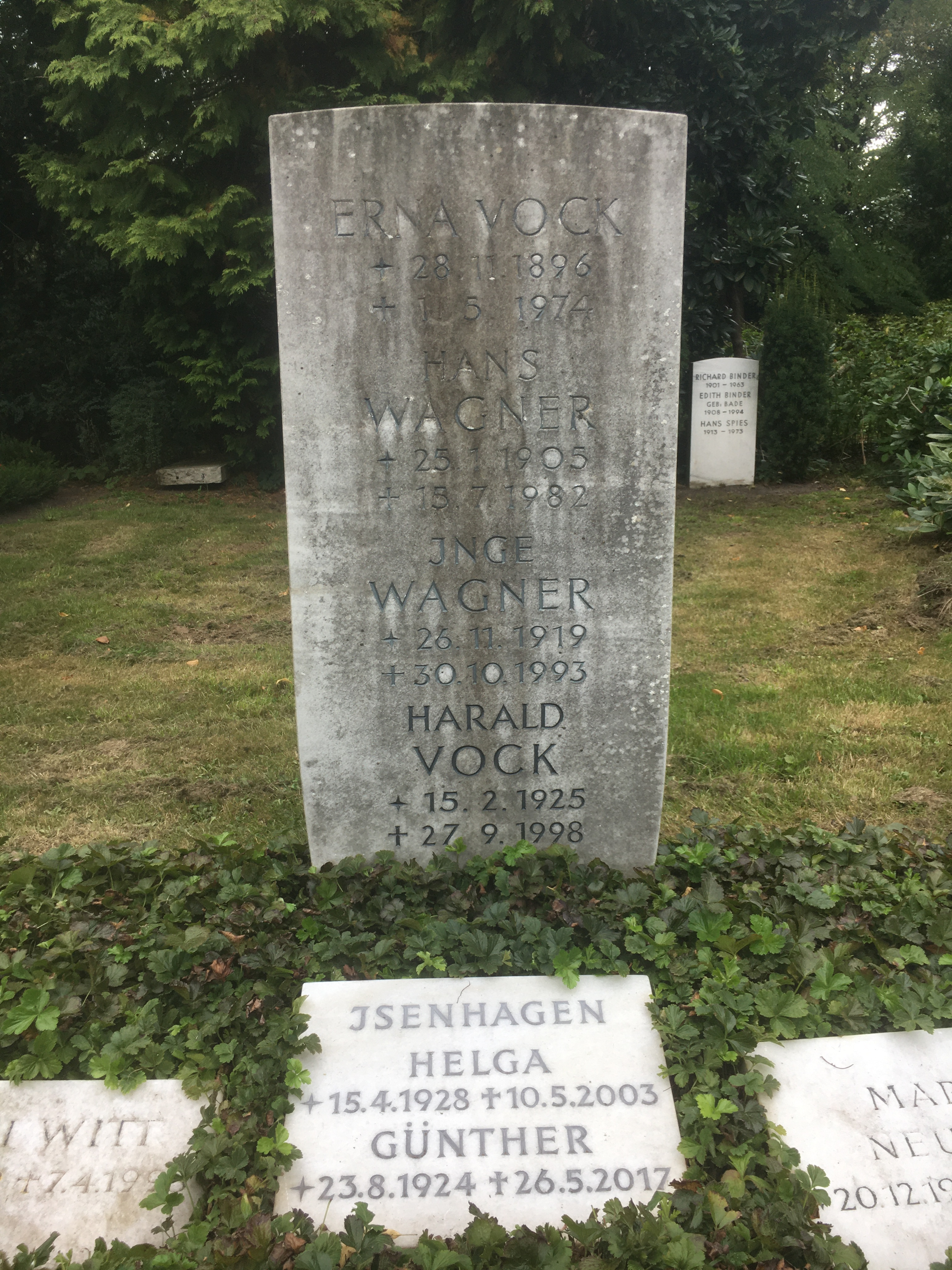
- Tombstone of Harald Vock
- Born: 15 February 1926; Hamburg, Germany
- Died: 26 September 1998 (aged 72); Hamburg, Germany
- Occupations: Director, producer, writer
- Years active: 1954–1999

Harald Vock (1925–1998) was a German television producer and television director. While he mainly worked in television, he also directed or scripted a handful of feature films for cinema such as Our Doctor is the Best in 1969.

== Biography ==
Vock began after 1945 as a police reporter at the press and radio. From 1955 until the 1980s he acted as a conversation leader of NDR television. Here he was the founder of television shows music from Studio B. He also wrote scripts and radio plays.

During the 1960s, he actively promoted Anita Lindblom on German television.

Around 1970 he led several times directed in film comedies of the producer Karl Spiehs. He participated as an idea of the author, director, and producer at the emergence of the crime series Special Discussion K1 and the men of K3. For the latter, Vock received the acidic cucumber of the media women's meeting in 1994. In 1981 he was honored for the book on the episode the revenge of the V-Man of the Series Special Decor K1 with the Golden Gong. In 1984 he published the crime novel the V-Man.

In 1985, he quit his job as entertainment director of NDR to focus on screenwriting.

In 1994 he initiated the police and trainer series on behalf of the law, from 1997 he wrote for the series Coast Guard. As head of the NDR television entertainment, Vock has deleted all recordings of entertainment show music from Studio B to a jubilee program. Harald Vock found his last rest on the Hamburg Cemetery Ohlsdorf.

== Selected filmography ==
- Ein Sarg für Mr. Holloway (1968, TV film)
- Always Trouble with the Teachers (1968)
- Our Doctor is the Best (1969)
- Unsere Pauker gehen in die Luft (1970)
- The Reverend Turns a Blind Eye (1971)
- Always Trouble with the Reverend (1972)
- Sonderdezernat K1 (1972–1982, TV series, producer)
- Crazy – Completely Mad (1973, writer)
- Wenn jeder Tag ein Sonntag wär (1973)

== Bibliography ==
- Fenner, Angelica. Race under Reconstruction in German Cinema: Robert Stemmle's Toxi. University of Toronto Press, 2011.
