= Always Trouble with the Teachers =

1968 film

- Directed by: Harald Vock
- Written by: Janne Furch; August Rieger
- Starring: Roy Black; Uschi Glas; Peter Weck
- Cinematography: Kurt Junek
- Music by: Claudius Alzner
- Production company: Lisa Film
- Distributed by: Gloria Film
- Release date: 18 October 1968
- Running time: 80 minutes
- Country: West Germany
- Language: German

Always Trouble with the Teachers (German: Immer Ärger mit den Paukern) is a 1968 West German comedy film directed by Harald Vock and starring Roy Black, Uschi Glas, and Peter Weck.

== Partial cast ==
- Roy Black as Peter Hartung, Student
- Uschi Glas as Dagmar, Modeschülerin
- Georg Thomalla as Dr. Schwabmann
- Peter Weck as Studienrat Dr. Berger
- Franziska Oehme as Christa, Assistantin
- Jan Koester as Paul Hartung, Schüler
- Corinna Genest as Fräulein von Ebendorf
- Sissy Löwinger as Therese
- Roland Astor as Hans Werner
- Monika Strauch as Modeschülerin
- Klaus Hoeft as Schüler
- Helga Tölle as Modeschülerin

== Bibliography ==
- Blaney, Martin (1992). Symbiosis Or Confrontation?: The Relationship Between the Film Industry and Television in the Federal Republic of Germany from 1950 to 1985. Berlin: Edition Sigma. ISBN 978-3-89404-906-5.
