= Hochwürden erbt das Paradies =

1993 film

- The priest
- Written by: Erich Tomek
- Directed by: Otto Retzer
- Starring: Hans Clarin
- Country of origin: Germany
- Original language: German

Production
- Cinematography: Franz Xaver Lederle
- Running time: 90 minutes

Original release
- Release: 14 November 1993

Hochwürden erbt das Paradies is a 1993 German comedy television film. It recounts the escapades of a rural Austrian priest and his parishioners.

== Cast ==
- Hans Clarin as Gustav
- Jochen Busse as Oskar Stiller
- Julia Biedermann as Eva
- Thomas Steiner as Robert
- Tony Wegas
- Johanna Hohloch
- Dagmar Koller as Mitzi
- Gudrun Velisek
- Else Quecke
- Kurt Weinzierl as Apotheker
- Adolf Peichl
- Gustav Jandek
- Veronika Faber
- Renate Muhri
- Götz Otto
