= Thomas Fritsch =

German voice actor (1944–2021)

- Born: 16 January 1944; Dresden, Germany
- Died: 21 April 2021 (aged 77); Berlin, Germany
- Occupations: Actor; dubbing actor; schlager singer
- Years active: 1962–2019
- Parents: Willy Fritsch (father); Dinah Grace (mother)

Thomas Fritsch (16 January 1944 – 21 April 2021) was a German film, television and dubbing actor and schlager singer. He was regarded as the "Sonnyboy" (Note: A young man who radiates charm and a carefree cheerfulness, which produces sympathy from others. (Junger Mann, der Charme und eine unbeschwerte Fröhlichkeit ausstrahlt, dem die Sympathien zufliegen.)) in the German cinema of the 1960s, and became one of the best-known actors by his presence in television series. Later, he was the German voice of Russell Crowe, of Scar in The Lion King, and of Diego in Ice Age.

== Life ==
Fritsch was born in Dresden, the son of famous actor Willy Fritsch and dancer Dinah Grace. The family moved to Hamburg after World War II. Director and actor Gustaf Gründgens encouraged the 16-year-old Thomas to become an actor. He trained at an acting school in Hamburg-Pöseldorf for three years.

He played his first film role in the 1962 Austrian movie Julia, Du bist zauberhaft at age 17, alongside Lilli Palmer. He starred opposite Daliah Lavi in Black-White-Red Four Poster, and became a favourite of teenagers. He was frequently featured on the cover of the youth magazine Bravo. He played in And So to Bed in 1963, alongside Hildegard Knef. In 1964, he appeared in his only film together with his father, Das hab ich von Papa gelernt. He appeared two more times with his father, in the ZDF television specials Das gibts doch zweimal in 1965 and Andere Zeiten, andere Sitten. Die Thomas-Fritsch-Show in 1967. He had film roles in Drei Männer in Santa Cruz, Onkel Toms Hütte, and played one of the three men in the title of Drei Männer im Schnee, among many others.

In the 1970s, Fritsch appeared in the television series Der Kommissar and Derrick several times. From 1977, Fritsch appeared in a leading role in the popular series Drei sind einer zuviel (Three are one too many) by Barbara Noack, portraying a man in a love triangle story. It made him one of Germany's most popular actors. He also starred in the television series Rivalen der Rennbahn (1989). In 2004, he made a return to cinema when he appeared as the villainous Earl of Cockwood in Der Wixxer, a comedy which spoofed the German Edgar Wallace films of the 1960s.

Fritsch became known as a voice actor. He was the German voice of Russell Crowe in Gladiator, Master and Commander: The Far Side of the World and Proof of Life. He dubbed Scar in the German version of The Lion King in 1994; Diego, a Smilodon, in Ice Age and sequels, beginning in 2002; and Aslan in The Chronicles of Narnia: The Lion, the Witch and the Wardrobe and sequels. In the 2000s, he replaced the late Joachim Kemmer as Lumiere for the "Human Again" DVD feature of Beauty and the Beast. His last role was the narrator in the 2018 children's film Jim Knopf und Lukas der Lokomotivführer, an adaption of Michael Ende's Jim Button and Luke the Engine Driver.

== Private life and death ==
Fritsch divided his time between his home in Munich and his home on the Greek island of Mykonos. He had been diagnosed with a brain tumour in 1990. In 2006, Fritsch revealed he was bisexual. In 2019, it was announced that Fritsch was diagnosed with dementia and was living in an assisted living facility.

Fritsch died on 21 April 2021 in Berlin, aged 77. He was given a burial at sea near the island of Sylt.

== Films ==
=== Actor ===
Fritsch played in films and television (TV) series, including:

- Adorable Julia (1962), as Roger, Julia's son
- Black-White-Red Four Poster (1962), as Jean de Wehrt
- And So to Bed (1963), as High school student
- Full Hearts and Empty Pockets (1964), as Rick Hofer
- Drei Männer in Santa Cruz (The Last Ride to Santa Cruz, 1964), as Carlos
- Das hab ich von Papa gelernt (I Learned It from Father, 1964), as Andreas Andermann
- Legend of a Gunfighter (1964), as Chris Harper
- Halløj i himmelsengen (1965), as Pierre de Sauterne
- Onkel Toms Hütte (Uncle Tom's Cabin, 1965), as George Shelby
- The Swedish Girl (1965), as Philipp
- Das gibt's nur zweimal (1965, TV)
- Apollo Goes on Holiday (1968)
- Der Kommissar (TV series)
  - Der Papierblumenmörder (episode 15) – (1970)
  - Mord nach der Uhr (episode 94) – (1975)
- Drei Männer im Schnee (Three Men in the Snow) (1974)
- Hoftheater (1975, TV series)
- Derrick (TV series):
  - Nur Aufregungen für Rohn (1975)
  - Abendfrieden (1977)
  - Ein Todesengel (1979)
  - Der Charme der Bahamas (1986)
  - Anruf in der Nacht (1986)
  - Tossners Ende (1989)
- Drei sind einer zuviel (1977, TV series)
- Rivalen der Rennbahn (1989, TV series)
- At Your Own Risk (1995)
- Rosamunde Pilcher: Federn im Wind (2004)
- Der Wixxer (2004)
- Das total verrückte Wunderauto (2006)
- Die ProSieben Märchenstunde (2006, TV series)
- Meine wunderbare Familie (2007)
- The Secret of Loch Ness (2008)

=== Voice ===
Fritsch voiced the following productions, among others:

- The Good, the Bad and the Ugly- Tuco (Pro 7 dub)
- Apocalypse Now (1979)
- The Three Musketeers (1993)
- The Nanny (1993–1999) – Maxwell Sheffield
- The Lion King (1994) – Scar
- Gargoyles (1994–1996) – Goliath
- Felidae (1994)
- The Pebble and the Penguin (1995)
- Die Hard with a Vengeance (1995) – Simon Gruber
- Balto (1995) – Steele
- Mega Man (1995–1996)
- White Squall (1996)
- Jim Button and Luke the Engine Driver (1996) – Luke
- Doctor Dolittle (1998)
- Lost in Space (1998)
- The Lion King II: Simba's Pride (1998) – Scar
- Das Dschungelbuch, Mowglis Abenteuer (1998)
- Rudolph the Red-Nosed Reindeer: The Movie (1999) - Slyly the fox
- Gladiator (2000) – Maximus
- Help! I'm a Fish (2000) – Joe, the pilotfish
- Thomas and the Magic Railroad (2000) – Mr. Conductor
- Harry Potter and the Philosopher's Stone (2001) – Garrick Ollivander
- Ice Age (2002) – Diego
- Treasure Planet (2002) – Dr. Delbert Doppler
- The Cat Returns (2002)
- Raining Cats and Frogs (2003)
- Finding Nemo (2003) – Nigel
- South Park (2003) - Russell Crowe and Steven Spielberg
- Master and Commander: The Far Side of the World (2003)
- The Lord of the Rings: The Return of the King (extended edition) – (2003)
- Lemony Snicket's A Series of Unfortunate Events (2004)
- Steamboy (2005)
- Kingdom of Heaven (2005)
- Corpse Bride (2005) – Bonejangles
- Cinderella Man (2005)
- The Chronicles of Narnia: The Lion, the Witch and the Wardrobe (2005) – Aslan
- Battlestar Galactica (2006)
- Ice Age: The Meltdown (2006) – Diego
- Copying Beethoven (2006)
- Eragon (2006)
- Herr Figo und das Geheimnis der Perlenfabrik (2007)
- Surf's Up (2007) - Big Z
- 3:10 to Yuma (2007 film) (2007) - Ben Wade
- Astérix at the Olympic Games (2007)
- Terry Pratchett's The Colour of Magic – Lord Vetinari
- Snow Buddies (2008)
- Kung Fu Panda (2008) – Tai Lung
- The Chronicles of Narnia: Prince Caspian (2008)
- The Dark Knight (2008)
- Sacred 2 (2008)
- The Incredible Hulk (2008)
- Ice Age: Dawn of the Dinosaurs (2009) – Diego
- Risen (2009)
- Diablo 3 (2012)
- Ice Age: Continental Drift (2012) - Diego
- Ice Age: Collision Course (2016) - Diego

== Awards ==
- 1963: Bambi Award, Bambi Award 1963, as the best newcomer for Black-White-Red Four Poster
- 2002: Deutscher Preis für Synchron for Second Chance – Alles wird gut
