= Don't Get Angry =

- Theatrical film poster
- German: Mensch, ärgere dich nicht
- Directed by: Peter Weck
- Written by: Fritz Werner; Kurt Nachmann
- Produced by: Walter Traut
- Starring: Uschi Glas; Beppo Brem; Georg Thomalla
- Cinematography: Heinz Hölscher
- Edited by: Eva Zeyn
- Music by: Gerhard Heinz
- Production companies: Divina-Film; Regina Film
- Distributed by: Gloria Film
- Release date: 15 December 1972
- Running time: 87 minutes
- Country: West Germany
- Language: German

Don't Get Angry (German: Mensch, ärgere dich nicht) is a 1972 West German comedy film directed by Peter Weck and starring Uschi Glas, Beppo Brem and Georg Thomalla. It takes its name from a popular German board game.

The film's sets were designed by the art director Leo Metzenbauer.

== Cast ==
- Uschi Glas as Ulla Wendt
- Beppo Brem as Horst Vogel
- Georg Thomalla as Ewald Fröhlich
- Karl Lieffen as Max
- Chris Roberts as Thomas Conrad
- Christiane Hörbiger as Frl. Glöckner
- Corinna Genest as Mathilde Kühlborn
- Bruno Hübner as Clusius
- Max Grießer as Katzinger
- Klaus Dahlen as Alois
- Veronika Fitz as Frau Linsinger
- Hans Korte as Paul Wegmann
- Erni Singerl as Zenzi Vogel
- Margot Mahler as Frl. Quecke
- Bruno W. Pantel as Director der Milchfirma
- Willy Harlander as Ratzig, auto repairer
- Erich Kleiber as Civil servant
- Veronika Faber as saleswoman
- Otto Retzer as elevator repairer
- Werner Singh as policeman
- Dagobert Walter as Will
