= Corinna Genest =

German actress (1938–2023)

- Born: 16 August 1938; Konstanz, Baden-Württemberg, Germany
- Died: 22 November 2023 (aged 85); Munich, Germany
- Occupation: Actress
- Years active: 1960–2002 (film and television

Corinna Genest (16 August 1938 – 22 November 2023) was a German film and television actress. She was the daughter of the actress Gudrun Genest and the great niece of Hubert von Meyerinck. Genest died in Munich on 22 November 2023, at the age of 85.

== Selected filmography ==
- Stage Fright (1960)
- Always Trouble with the Teachers (1968)
- Our Doctor is the Best (1969)
- When You're With Me (1970)
- Nachbarn sind zum Ärgern da (1970)
- Don't Get Angry (1972)
- Hurra, die Schwedinnen sind da (1978)
- Heiße Kartoffeln (1980)
- Mama Mia – Don't Panic (1984)
- Geld oder Leber! (1986)

== Bibliography ==
- Peter Cowie. World Filmography, 1968. Tantivy Press, 1977.
