= Vom Webstuhl zur Weltmacht =

- Country of origin: Germany; Czechoslovakia

Original release
- Network: Das Erste

Vom Webstuhl zur Weltmacht is a German television series about the Fugger family.

== See also ==
- List of German television series
