= Thekla Carola Wied =

German actress (born 1944)

- Born: 5 February 1944 (age 81); Breslau, Germany (now Wrocław, Poland)
- Occupation: Actress

Thekla Carola Wied (born Thekla Wiedmann; 5 February 1944) is a German actress educated in West Berlin at the Evangelisches Gymnasium zum Grauen Kloster. Her father was a teacher for Latin. After abitur she studied from 1965 till 1967 acting at Folkwang University of the Arts in Essen. In 1989 she starred in Rivalen der Rennbahn.

== Selected filmography ==
- Trace of a Girl (1967)
- Taxi 4012 (TV film, 1976)
- Collin (TV film, 1981)
- Der Kunstfehler (TV film, 1983)
- Derrick - Season 10, Episode 3: "Geheimnisse einer Nacht" (1983)
- Ich heirate eine Familie (TV series, 14 episodes, 1983–1986)
- Rivalen der Rennbahn (TV series, 4 episodes, 1989)
- Wie gut, dass es Maria gibt (TV series, 27 episodes, 1990–1991)
- At Your Own Risk (TV series, 39 episodes, 1993–2000)
- Ich klage an (TV film, 1994)
- A Woman at the Top (TV film, 1995)
- Only a Dead Man Is a Good Man (TV film, 1999)
- Liebe ist die halbe Miete (TV film, 2002)
- Zwei Seiten der Liebe (TV film, 2002)
- Tage des Sturms (TV film, 2003)
- Liebe auf Bewährung (TV film, 2004)
- Meine große Liebe (TV film, 2005)
- Sie ist meine Mutter (TV film, 2006)
- Tür an Tür (TV film, 2013)
- Sein gutes Recht (TV film, 2014)
- What I Know About You (TV film, 2017)
- Martha Liebermann: A Stolen Life (TV film, 2022)
