= Leo Metzenbauer =

- Born: 15 January 1910; Vienna, Austro-Hungarian Empire
- Died: 10 April 1993 (aged 83)
- Other name: Leopold Metzenbauer
- Occupation: Art Director
- Years active: 1953–1974 (film)

Leo Metzenbauer (15 January 1910 – 10 April 1993) was an Austrian art director.

== Selected filmography ==
- Daughter of the Regiment (1953)
- The Schimeck Family (1957)
- The Forests Sing Forever (1959)
- Gustav Adolf's Page (1960)
- The Inheritance of Bjorndal (1960)
- The Cry of the Wild Geese (1961)
- Adorable Julia (1962)
- Our Crazy Aunts in the South Seas (1964)
- The World Revolves Around You (1964)
- Don't Get Angry (1972)

== Bibliography ==
- Kaul, Walter. Schöpferische Filmarchitektur. Dt. Kinemathek, 1971.
