= Timmo Niesner =

German actor

Timmo Niesner (born 5 November 1971, in West Berlin) is a German actor who specializes in dubbing.

== Biography ==
Timmo Niesner had his breakthrough as a 12-year-old when he appeared on television.

Timmo Niesner is the Official German dub-over artist of Elijah Wood, as well as dubbing over the roles of Tom Welling, Peter Sarsgaard and Topher Grace in German.

Since 1999, Timmo voice dubbed over Elijah Wood's roles on Media, in German.

In videogames, He also gave the German dubbing voice to Spyro the Dragon in The Legend of Spyro trilogy, in which his original English voice was also performed by Elijah Wood. He was also the German voice of WALL-E in WALL-E and Chappie in Chappie. Most recently his served as the voice of Arno Dorian in the video game Assassin's Creed: Unity.
