= Zwei am großen See =

- Created by: Andreas Föhr and Thomas Letocha
- Starring: Uschi Glas; Ruth Drexel; Toni Berger; Gred Anthroff; Max von Thun; Alexander Held; Florian Weber; Werner Rom Bürgermeister; Michael Greiling; Angelika Sedleier; Alexandra Horn; Johanna Bittenbinder; Eva-Maria Meier; Wolfgang Hinze; Maximilian Krückl; Hans Clarin
- Country of origin: Germany
- Original language: German
- No. of seasons: 1
- No. of episodes: 5

Production
- Producers: Ernst Von Theumer, Jr.
- Running time: 90 minutes

Zwei am großen See is a Heimatfilm series by producer Ernst von Theumer, Jr. Five feature films were made from 2003 to 2006, and all were shot in Bad Tölz and on and the surrounding area of Lake Starnberg.

== Plot ==
A woman named Regina runs the villa of an elderly man named Justus, in the hopes that she is the one who will be given full authority over the home. However, when the will is opened, the house is sold to a different person, and Regina moves into an apartment.

Regina eventually goes into debt because she had counted on the villa for financial support and can no longer pay off the apartment she has just bought. The nasty businessman and landlord Bartholomäus Breitwieser drove them into this trap. His plan was to use it to lease the villa from Regina for a small salary. It is the only villa with direct access to the lake nearby, and is therefore very valuable from a gastronomic perspective. Breitwieser approaches the true heiress, and the woman who just moved in, Antonia. But when Antonia learns that Breitwieser only wants to deconstruct the villa, she decides to open a hotel herself with Regina as her partner.

The story is told in five films. A local Amigo mafia is also involved, including the mayor and the savings bank director, who, together with Breitwieser, do almost everything to get the property. Lawyer Johanna Lottermeier is also fighting on the side of Antonia and Regina.

== Episodes ==
A total of five film-length "episodes" were made. All movies were directed by Walter Bannert.

- Zwei am großen See (2003)
- Zwei am großen See – Die Eröffnung (2005)
- Zwei am großen See – Angriff aufs Paradies (2005)
- Zwei am großen See – Feindliche Übernahme (2006)
- Zwei am großen See – Große Gefühle (2006)

== See also ==
- List of German television series
