= Ein Schloß am Wörthersee =

- Starring: Roy Black (seasons 1 & 2) Uschi Glas (season 3)
- Country of origin: Austria
- No. of seasons: 3
- No. of episodes: 33 + 1 special

Production
- Running time: 50 minutes

Original release
- Release: 1990 – 1993

Ein Schloß am Wörthersee is a German–Austrian comedy television series made by Lisa Film and RTL, known internationally as Lakeside Hotel.

The series ran for 33 episodes in 3 seasons from 1990 to 1992, followed by a 90-minute special in 1993.

Ein Schloß is known for its many guest stars, among them Peter Kraus, Ottfried Fischer, Hans Clarin, Zachi Noy and Georg Thomalla, and internationally known actors and musicians Falco, the Knef, Telly Savalas, Larry Hagman, Linda Gray, Nina Hagen and David Cassidy.

Hansi Kraus reprised his role as Pepe Nietnagel from Zur Hölle mit den Paukern and sequels, in 3 episodes.

== See also ==
- List of German television series
