= Polizeiinspektion 1 =

- Starring: Walter Sedlmayr; Elmar Wepper; Uschi Glas
- Country of origin: Germany

Polizeiinspektion 1 is a German television series.

== See also ==
- List of German television series
