= List of Austrian films of the 1960s =

A list of films produced in the Cinema of Austria in the 1960s ordered by year of release. For an alphabetical list of articles on Austrian films see Category:Austrian films. Due to a sharp decline in Austrian film production, the rate of films released reached very low numbers by the end of the decade, with most of these being international co-productions with partial Austrian participation.

== 1960 ==
Title	Director	Cast	Genre	Notes
1960
Arnulf Rainer	Peter Kubelka		Short film	
Big Request Concert (Das große Wunschkonzert)	Arthur Maria Rabenalt	Carlos Thompson, Linda Christian, Edmund Purdom, Rudolf Schock	Musical	Entered into the 2nd Moscow International Film Festival
Crime Tango	Géza von Cziffra	Peter Alexander, Vivi Bach	Musical comedy	Co-production with West Germany
Frauen in Teufels Hand (Women in the Devil's Hand)	Hermann Leitner	Maria Sebaldt, Helmut Schmid	Spy film	Schönbrunn-Film
Guitars Sound Softly Through the Night	Hans Deppe	Fred Bertelmann, Margit Nünke, Vivi Bach	Romance	
Gustav Adolf's Page	Rolf Hansen	Liselotte Pulver, Curd Jürgens, Ellen Schwiers	Historical	Co-production with West Germany
Herr Puntila and His Servant Matti (Herr Puntila und sein Knecht Matti)	Alberto Cavalcanti	Curt Bois, Heinz Engelmann	Comedy	Filmed 1955 in the Soviet occupation zone
I'm Marrying the Director	Wolfgang Liebeneiner	Heidelinde Weis, Gerhard Riedmann, Hans Söhnker	Comedy	
The Inheritance of Bjorndal (Das Erbe von Björndal)	Gustav Ucicky	Joachim Hansen, Maj-Britt Nilsson, Brigitte Horney	serious Heimatfilm	Mundus/Wien-Film
Mit Himbeergeist geht alles besser (The Magnificent Rogue)	Georg Marischka	O. W. Fischer, Marianne Koch, Petra Schürmann, Helmut Qualtinger, Fritz Muliar	Comedy	
The White Horse Inn	Werner Jacobs	Peter Alexander, Waltraut Haas, Adrian Hoven	Musical	

== 1961 ==
Title	Director	Cast	Genre	Notes
The Adventures of Count Bobby	Géza von Cziffra	Peter Alexander, Vivi Bach, Gunther Philipp	Musical comedy	Sascha-Film
Autofahrer unterwegs (Car Driver En Route)	Otto Ambros	Margot Philipp, Jimmy Makulis, Fritz Muliar	Travel comedy	
The Cry of the Wild Geese	Hans Heinrich	Ewald Balser, Heidemarie Hatheyer, Brigitte Horney	Drama	
Geschichten aus dem Wienerwald (Tales from the Vienna Woods)	Erich Neuberg	Johanna Matz, Walter Kohut, Hans Moser, Helmut Qualtinger	Drama	
Geständnis einer Sechzehnjährigen (Confession of a Sixteen-Year-Old Girl)	Georg Tressler	Barbara Frey, Wolfgang Preiss, Ivan Desny	Youth film / Drama	Wien Film
Der Herr Karl (Mr. Karl)	Erich Neuberg	Helmut Qualtinger, Carl Merz		
Jedermann	Gottfried Reinhardt	Walther Reyer, Ellen Schwiers	Drama	
Man in the Shadows	Arthur Maria Rabenalt	Helmut Qualtinger, Ellen Schwiers, Barbara Frey	Crime	Sascha-Film
Mariandl	Werner Jacobs	Cornelia Froboess, Rudolf Prack, Waltraut Haas	Heimatfilm	Sascha-Film
Our Crazy Aunts	Rolf Olsen	Gunther Philipp, Vivi Bach	Comedy	
Season in Salzburg	Franz Josef Gottlieb	Peter Alexander, Waltraut Haas, Gunther Philipp	Musical	

== 1962 ==
Title	Director	Cast	Genre	Notes
Adorable Julia	Alfred Weidenmann	Lilli Palmer, Charles Boyer, Jean Sorel, Charles Régnier, Thomas Fritsch		Austrian-French co-production. Entered into the 1962 Cannes Film Festival
The Bandit and the Princess	Franz Antel	Helmuth Lohner, Georg Thomalla, Paul Hörbiger	Adventure comedy	
Dance with Me Into the Morning	Peter Dörre	Guggi Löwinger, Paul Hörbiger	Musical	
Die Fledermaus	Géza von Cziffra	Peter Alexander, Marianne Koch, Marika Rökk, Willy Millowitsch, Gunther Philipp, Boy Gobert, Hans Moser, Oskar Sima, Susi Nicoletti	Operetta	
Lulu	Rolf Thiele	Nadja Tiller, O. E. Hasse, Hildegard Knef, Mario Adorf	Crime drama	Based on the Lulu plays by Frank Wedekind
Mariandl's Homecoming	Werner Jacobs	Cornelia Froboess, Rudolf Prack, Waltraut Haas	Drama	
The Merry Widow	Werner Jacobs	Peter Alexander, Karin Hübner, Gunther Philipp	Musical	
No Kissing Under Water	Erich Heindl	Gunther Philipp, Evi Kent, Rolf Olsen	Comedy	
Ohne Krimi geht die Mimi nie ins Bett	Franz Antel	Heinz Erhardt, Karin Dor, Ann Smyrner, Edith Hancke, Harald Juhnke, Bill Ramsey	Musical comedy	
Professor Bernhardi	Erich Neuberg	Leopold Rudolf	Drama	
Romance in Venice	Eduard von Borsody	Ann Smyrner, Walther Reyer, Willy Birgel	Romance	
Der rote Rausch (The Red Intoxication)	Wolfgang Schleif	Klaus Kinski, Brigitte Grothum	serious Heimatfilm	Rex-Film
The Sweet Life of Count Bobby	Géza von Cziffra	Peter Alexander, Ingeborg Schöner, Gunther Philipp	Musical comedy	
Waldrausch	Paul May	Marianne Hold, Gerhard Riedmann, Ingeborg Schöner	Drama	
Wedding Night in Paradise	Paul Martin	Peter Alexander, Marika Rökk, Waltraut Haas	Musical comedy	
Werewolf in a Girls' Dormitory (Lycanthropus)	Paolo Heusch	Barbara Lass, Carl Schell, Curt Lowens	Horror	Austrian-Italian co-production

== 1963 ==
Title	Director	Cast	Genre	Notes
An Alibi for Death	Alfred Vohrer	Ruth Leuwerik, Peter van Eyck, Charles Régnier, Hannelore Elsner, Sieghardt Rupp	Crime	
And So to Bed	Alfred Weidenmann	Lilli Palmer, Hildegard Knef, Daliah Lavi	Comedy	Co-production with West Germany
Bergwind	Eduard von Borsody	Hans von Borsody		Entered into the 4th Moscow International Film Festival
The Black Cobra	Rudolf Zehetgruber	Adrian Hoven, Ann Smyrner, Wolfgang Preiss, Klaus Kinski, Ady Berber	Crime	
Charley's Aunt	Géza von Cziffra	Peter Alexander	Musical comedy	
Don't Fool with Me	Kurt Nachmann	Adrian Hoven, Wera Frydtberg, Paul Hörbiger	Musical comedy	
Hochzeit am Neusiedler See (Wedding on the Neusiedler Lake)	Rolf Olsen	Gertraud Jesserer, Udo Jürgens	Comedy	Union Film
Is Geraldine an Angel?	Steve Previn	Cornelia Froboess, Peter Weck, Vilma Degischer	Comedy	
The Last Ride to Santa Cruz	Rolf Olsen	Edmund Purdom, Mario Adorf, Marianne Koch, Klaus Kinski, Marisa Mell, Sieghardt Rupp	Western	Wiener Stadthalle
Leutnant Gustl (None but the Brave)	John Olden	Peter Weck, Hans Moser, Kurt Meisel, Ernst Stankovski, Christiane Hörbiger, Ewald Balser	Drama	
The Model Boy	Werner Jacobs	Peter Alexander, Cornelia Froboess, Theo Lingen	Comedy	
Our Crazy Nieces	Rolf Olsen	Gunther Philipp, Vivi Bach, Paul Hörbiger	Musical comedy	Wiener Stadthalle
With Best Regards	Kurt Nachmann	Georg Thomalla, Adrian Hoven, Paul Dahlke	Comedy	

== 1964 ==
Title	Director	Cast	Genre	Notes
The Great Skate	Franz Antel	Marika Kilius, Hans-Jürgen Bäumler, Heinz Erhardt	Musical comedy	Co-production with West Germany
Happy-End am Wörthersee (Happy Ending on the Wörthersee)	Hans Hollmann	Waltraut Haas, Rudolf Prack, Peter Kraus	Travel comedy, holiday comedy	Wiener Stadthalle
Help, My Bride Steals	Werner Jacobs	Peter Alexander, Cornelia Froboess, Gunther Philipp	Comedy	
I Learned It from Father	Axel von Ambesser	Willy Fritsch, Thomas Fritsch, Gertraud Jesserer	Comedy	Co-production with West Germany
Liebesgrüße aus Tirol (Love from the Tyrol)	Franz Antel	Peter Weck, Gitte Henning	Comedy	Neue Delta
Marry Me, Cherie	Axel von Ambesser	Paul Hubschmid, Letícia Román, Ann Smyrner	Comedy	
Our Crazy Aunts in the South Seas	Rolf Olsen	Gunther Philipp, Barbara Frey	Comedy	
Schweik's Awkward Years	Wolfgang Liebeneiner	Peter Alexander, Rudolf Prack, Gunther Philipp	Comedy	
The Spendthrift	Kurt Meisel	Walther Reyer, Josef Meinrad, Christiane Hörbiger	Drama	
Tim Frazer and the Mysterious Mister X	Ernst Hofbauer	Adrian Hoven, Corny Collins. Paul Löwinger	Crime thriller	Co-production with Belgium
The World Revolves Around You	Wolfgang Liebeneiner	Gitte Hænning, Rex Gildo, Claus Biederstaedt	Musical	

== 1965 ==
Title	Director	Cast	Genre	Notes
Call of the Forest	Franz Antel	Hans-Jürgen Bäumler, Johanna Matz, Mario Girotti	Drama	
DM-Killer	Rolf Thiele	Curd Jürgens, Daliah Lavi, Walter Giller	Comedy	
Geißel des Fleisches (Torment of the Flesh)	Eddy Saller	Herbert Fux	Crime	
Heidi	Werner Jacobs	Michaela May, Gustav Knuth, Margot Trooger	Family	
In Bed by Eight	Werner Jacobs	Peter Alexander, Gitte Hænning, Ingeborg Schöner	Musical comedy	Co-production with West Germany
Intrigue and Love (Kabale und Liebe)	Erich Neuberg	Werner Hinz, Michael Heltau, Johanna Mertinz, Judith Holzmeister, Leopold Rudolf, Gustav Knuth	Drama	
The Merry Wives of Windsor	Georg Tressler	Norman Foster	Opera	
Radetzkymarsch (Radetzky March)	Michael Kehlmann	Helmuth Lohner, Leopold Rudolf	Drama	
Shots in Threequarter Time	Alfred Weidenmann	Pierre Brice, Heinz Drache, Daliah Lavi, Senta Berger	Eurospy	a.k.a. Operation Solo
When the Grapevines Bloom on the Danube	Géza von Cziffra	Hansjörg Felmy, Ingeborg Schöner, Letícia Román	Comedy	Co-production with West Germany

== 1966 ==
Title	Director	Cast	Genre	Notes
Congress of Love	Géza von Radványi	Lilli Palmer, Curd Jürgens, Hannes Messemer	Historical comedy	Co-production with France and West Germany
Count Bobby, The Terror of The Wild West	Paul Martin	Peter Alexander, Olga Schoberová, Gunther Philipp	Comedy	
The Fountain of Love	Ernst Hofbauer	Ann Smyrner, Hans-Jürgen Bäumler, Sieghardt Rupp	Comedy	
How to Seduce a Playboy	Michael Pfleghar	Peter Alexander, Renato Salvatori, Scilla Gabel, Antonella Lualdi, Joachim Fuchsberger	Comedy	Co-production with Italy
Killer's Carnival	Sheldon Reynolds, Robert Lynn, Alberto Cardone	Stewart Granger, Lex Barker, Pierre Brice, Karin Dor, Klaus Kinski	Crime, Anthology	Co-production with Italy and France
Maigret and His Greatest Case	Alfred Weidenmann	Heinz Rühmann, Günter Strack, Françoise Prévost, Günther Ungeheuer, Ulli Lommel, Günther Stoll	Crime	Co-production with France and West Germany
Seven Vengeful Women	Rudolf Zehetgruber	Anne Baxter, Maria Perschy	Western	
Target for Killing	Manfred R. Köhler	Stewart Granger, Karin Dor, Curd Jürgens, Adolfo Celi, Rupert Davies, Klaus Kinski	Eurospy	Austrian-Italian co-production
Two Girls from the Red Star	Sammy Drechsel	Curd Jürgens, Lilli Palmer, Pascale Petit,	Comedy	Co-production with France and West Germany
Unsere Afrikareise (Our African Journey)	Peter Kubelka		Short film	
Der Weibsteufel (The Devil for Women)	Georg Tressler	Maria Emo, Sieghardt Rupp	Heimatfilm/Drama	Wien Film, entered into the 16th Berlin International Film Festival

== 1967 ==
Title	Director	Cast	Genre	Notes
The Great Happiness	Franz Antel	Marika Kilius, Hans-Jürgen Bäumler, Gunther Philipp	Musical comedy	
Kurzer Prozess	Michael Kehlmann	Helmut Qualtinger	Crime	West German production
The Liar and the Nun	Rolf Thiele	Heidelinde Weis, Robert Hoffmann, Curd Jürgens, Elisabeth Flickenschildt	Comedy	
The Sweet Sins of Sexy Susan (Susanne, die Wirtin von der Lahn)	Franz Antel	Teri Tordai, Mike Marshall, Pascale Petit, Harald Leipnitz, Jacques Herlin, Hannelore Auer	Comedy	Austrian-French-Italian-Hungarian co-production with Neue Delta Film
Die Verwundbaren (The Vulnerable)	Leo Tichat	Charlotte Artner, Frank Debray	Drama	Neton Film

== 1968 ==
Title	Director	Cast	Genre	Notes
Moss on the Stones (Moos auf den Steinen)	Georg Lhotzky	Erika Pluhar, Heinz Trixner, Fritz Muliar	Drama	WESTFILM
Schamlos (Shameless)	Eddy Saller	Udo Kier, Rolf Eden	Crime	
Sexy Susan Sins Again	Franz Antel	Teri Tordai, Harald Leipnitz, Pascale Petit	Historical comedy	Co-production with Italy

== 1969 ==
Title	Director	Cast	Genre	Notes
House of Pleasure	Franz Antel	Teri Tordai, Claudio Brook, Margaret Lee	Historical comedy	Co-production with Hungary, Italy and West Germany
Traumnovelle (Dream Story)	Wolfgang Glück	Karlheinz Böhm, Erika Pluhar	Drama	Co-production with West Germany

== Bibliography ==
- Von Dassanowsky, Robert. Austrian Cinema: A History. McFarland, 2005.
