= Kaiserjäger (film) =

- Directed by: Willi Forst
- Written by: Kurt Nachmann
- Produced by: Herbert Gruber
- Starring: See below
- Cinematography: Günther Anders; Hannes Staudinger
- Edited by: Herma Sandtner
- Music by: Hans Lang
- Release date: 1956
- Running time: 99 minutes
- Country: Austria
- Language: German

Kaiserjäger is a 1956 Austrian film directed by Willi Forst.

== Cast ==
- Adrian Hoven as Oberleutnant Pacher
- Erika Remberg as Antonia, ihre Tochter
- Judith Holzmeister as Gräfin Valerie Hardberg
- Rudolf Forster as Graf Leopold Hardberg, General a.D.
- Attila Hörbiger as Oberst Weigant
- Gunther Philipp as Leutnant der Reserve Otto Schatz
- Senta Wengraf as Helga von Metzler
- Oskar Sima as Oberjäger Kriegler
