= Erwin Halletz =

Austrian orchestra leader and songwriter (1923–2008)

Erwin Halletz (Vienna, 12 July 1923 – 27 October 2008) also performed as René Roulette, was an Austrian orchestra leader and songwriter.

== Songs ==
- Uncle Satchmo's Lullaby "Onkel Satchmo's Lullaby") is a 1959
- Einmal komm' ich wieder
- Vielleicht geschieht ein Wunder lyricist Peter Wehle
- Connie Francis Sings German Favorites "Immer und überall" Erwin Halletz, Peter Wehle
- Spectrum (Illinois Jacquet album) "I Remember Her So Well"

== Selected filmography ==
- His Daughter is Called Peter (1955)
- Request Concert (1955)
- Liane, Jungle Goddess (1956)
- The Tour Guide of Lisbon (1956)
- The Daring Swimmer (1957)
- The Star of Santa Clara (1958)
- La Paloma (1959)
- Everybody Loves Peter (1959)
- Isola Bella (1961)
- Our Crazy Aunts (1961)
- Our Crazy Nieces (1963)
- Our Crazy Aunts in the South Seas (1964)
- The Last Ride to Santa Cruz (1964)
- Fanny Hill (1964)
- Lana, Queen of the Amazons (1964)
- The Great Skate (1964)
- The Treasure of the Aztecs (1965)
- The Pyramid of the Sun God (1965)
- Who Wants to Sleep? (1965)
- DM-Killer (1965)
- Maigret and His Greatest Case (1966)
- When Night Falls on the Reeperbahn (1967)
- The Doctor of St. Pauli (1968)
- On the Reeperbahn at Half Past Midnight (1969)
- The Priest of St. Pauli (1970)
- That Can't Shake Our Willi! (1970)
- Hotel by the Hour (1970)
- Twenty Girls and the Teachers (1971)
- The Mad Aunts Strike Out (1971)
- Shocking Asia (1974)
- Shocking Asia II: The Last Taboos (1985)
