= Herbert Prikopa =

Austrian actor and composer

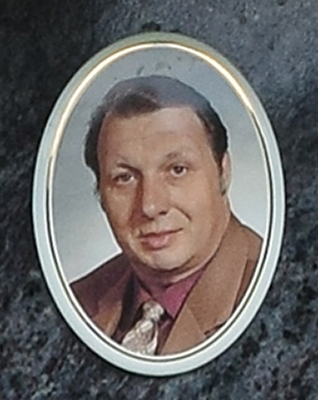

Herbert "Happi" Prikopa (30 November 1935 – 8 December 2015) was an Austrian television presenter, conductor, operatic tenor, actor, composer, writer, pianist and cabaret artist.

== Life and career ==
Born in Vienna, in 1935, at the age of 19, Prikopa became the youngest répétiteur at the Wiener Volksoper. After a singing engagement at the Wiener Kammeroper he became a member of Gerhard Bronner's "Namenloses Ensemble" in the cabaret programm Brettl vorm Klavier. In 1957 a soloist contract was signed at the Volksoper instead of the répétiteur contract. From 1988 to 2009 Prikopa belonged to the radio cabaret team "The Guglhupf". In the 1998/1999 to 2007/2008 seasons, Prikopa was musical director and conductor of the Johann Strauss Concert Gala in Vienna.

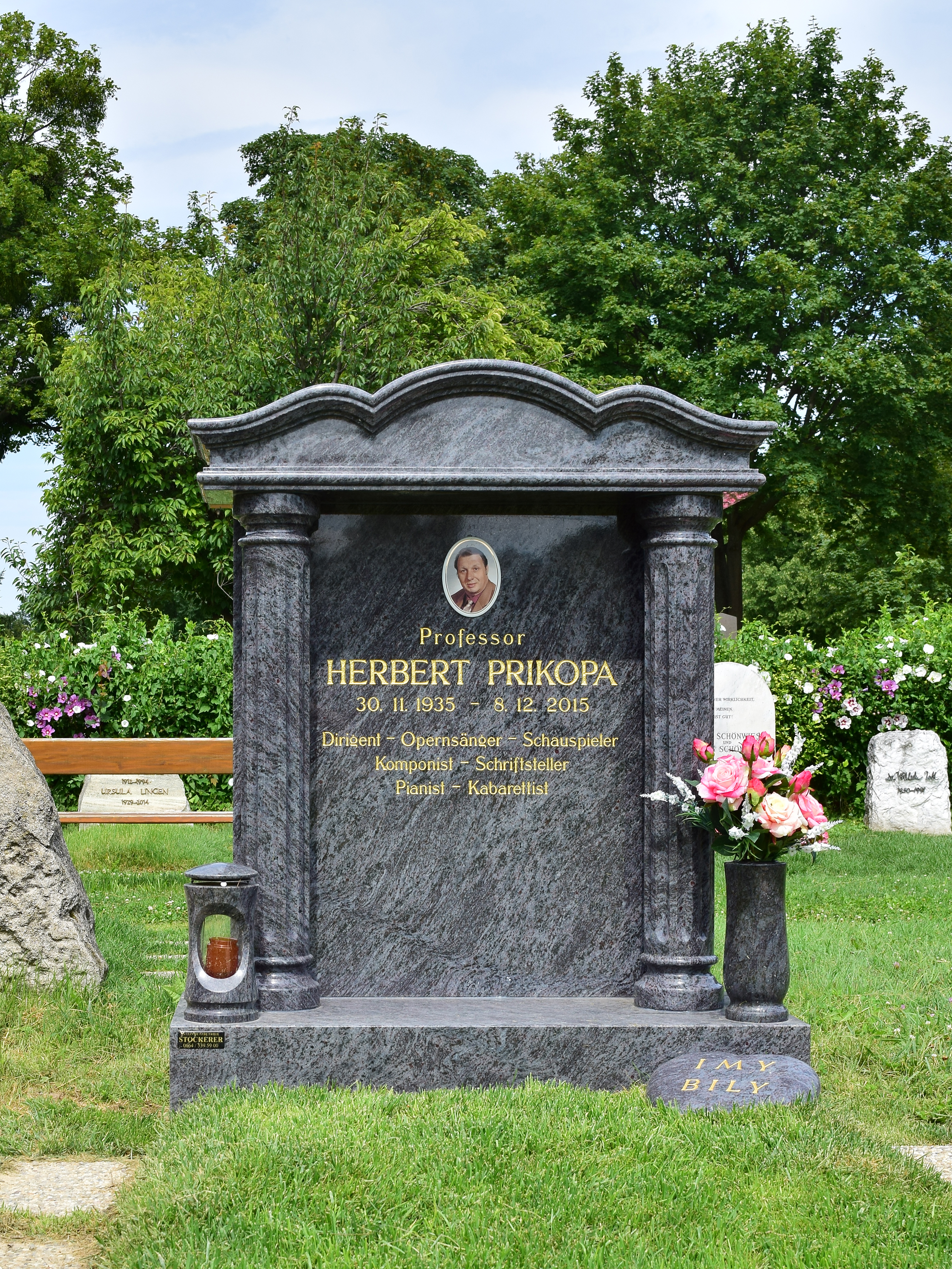
Grave in the Viennese central cemetery

He was the presenter of the children's television programme Auch Spaß muss sein on the ORF in the 1980s. Here he appeared as Herbert Happi Prikopa.

On 21 March 2005, Prikopa received the Berufstitel professor.

He died in Vienna on 8 December 2015 at age 80.

== Filmography ==
- 1957: Die Lindenwirtin vom Donaustrand
- 1957: Sissi – Fateful Years of an Empress
- 1960: My Niece Doesn't Do That
- 1962: No Kissing Under Water (also co-storyboard)
- 1963: Kaiser Joseph und die Bahnwärterstochter (director: Axel Corti)
- 1963: Our Crazy Aunts in the South Seas
- 1964: Das ist Stern schnuppe
- 1967: Jahresrückblick (end of year cabaret show) with Karl Farkas and Gerhard Bronner
- 1969–1970: Der alte Richter (television series)
- 1972–1976: Die Abenteuer des braven Soldaten Schwejk (TV serial)
- 1974: Das Land des Lächelns
- 1975: Der Kommissar: Das Goldene Pflaster (television series)
- 1977: Der Alte: Die Dienstreise (television series)
- 1978: The Tailor from Ulm
- 1978: Tatort – "Mord im Krankenhaus" (TV serials)
- 1981: Wie Böhmen noch bei Österreich war (director: Franz Josef Gottlieb)
- 1985: Der Leihopa (ORF - television series with Alfred Böhm
- 1992: Kaisermühlen Blues
- 1994: Mesmer
- 1999: An Almost Perfect Wedding (director: Reinhard Schwabenitzky)
- 2001: Julia – Eine ungewöhnliche Frau (sequel Das Ende des Weges)
- 2007: Oben ohne (TV serial, director: Reinhard Schwabenitzky)

== Radio plays ==
- 1984: Otto Brusatti: Die letzten Stunden der Menschheit – director: Otto Brusatti (ORF/WDR)

== Dissography (partial) ==
- Gräfin Mariza, (Emmerich Kálmán)
- Die lustige Witwe, (Franz Lehár)
- Le Grand Macabre, (György Ligeti)

== Some compositions ==
- Classic Piano. 28 Kompositionen für Klavier
- Visit to Chimera
- Chimera
- The Pillars of the world
- Thinking Positively
- Schrammel-Messe

== Works ==
- 1994: Erich Kunz – Biographie des Sängers, together with Cornelia Szabó-Knotik, Löcker–Verlag Wien, ISBN 978-3854092391
- 1998: 100 Jahre Volksoper – Die Geschichte eines notwendigen Theaters, Iberia-Verlag Vienna, ISBN 978-3-900436-67-4
- 2003: Strauß-Führer durch Europa und die umliegenden Ortschaften, Iberia-Verlag Vienna, ISBN 978-3-85052-124-6

== Awards ==
- 1986: Decoration of Honour for Services to the Republic of Austria
- 2011: Ehrenzeichen für Verdienste um das Land Wien
