= Griechischer Wein =

Single by Udo Jürgens
- Language: German
- English title: Greek Wine
- Released: November 1974
- Genre: Schlager
- Label: Ariola
- Songwriters: Udo Jürgens, Michael Kunze
- Producer: Ralph Siegel

"Griechischer Wein" is a 1974 song by Austrian singer-songwriter Udo Jürgens, with lyrics by Michael Kunze. It was produced by Ralph Siegel and released by Ariola.

The song is about Greek migrant workers in West Germany and their homesickness. It became one of Jürgens's best-known songs.

== Background ==
Kunze said that the lyrics were inspired by a real Greek pub near Munich's Rosenheimer Platz, where Greek workers met after work.

== Commercial performance ==
"Griechischer Wein" was one of Jürgens's biggest hits. It reached number one in Germany and Switzerland, and number two in Austria.

In Germany, it later received a platinum certification from the Bundesverband Musikindustrie for 600,000 units.

== Legacy ==
The song has often been discussed as an important popular song about migration in postwar Germany. An English adaptation, “Come Share the Wine”, was later recorded by Bing Crosby.
