= Our Crazy Nieces =

1963 film

- Directed by: Rolf Olsen
- Written by: Rolf Olsen
- Produced by: Karl Spiehs
- Starring: Gunther Philipp; Vivi Bach; Paul Hörbiger
- Cinematography: Karl Löb
- Edited by: Arnfried Heyne
- Music by: Erwin Halletz
- Production company: Wiener Stadthalle-Station Betriebs-und Produktions
- Distributed by: Constantin Film
- Release date: 12 February 1963
- Running time: 97 minutes
- Country: Austria
- Language: German

Our Crazy Nieces (German: Unsere tollen Nichten) is a 1963 Austrian comedy film directed by Rolf Olsen and starring Gunther Philipp, Vivi Bach, and Paul Hörbiger. It was the second part in a trilogy of films which began with Our Crazy Aunts in 1961 and finished with Our Crazy Aunts in the South Seas.

The film's sets were designed by the art director Wolf Witzemann. It was shot at the Sievering Studios in Vienna.

== Cast ==
- Gunther Philipp as Max Rettich
- Vivi Bach as Susi Güden
- Paul Hörbiger as Franz Eierlein
- Kurt Großkurth as Hyacinth Grad
- Gus Backus as Gus Sunday
- Udo Jürgens as Pit van Rees
- Ruth Stephan as Felicitas
- Oskar Sima as Direktor Mägerli
- Hans Richter as Dr. Heribert Wippel
- Hannelore Auer as Brigitte Branier
- Gerhard Wendland as Gerd Savona
- Rolf Olsen as Scheich Ibn al Bessara
- Rudolf Carl as Detektiv Emil Dametz
- Elisabeth Stiepl as Witwe Waltraud von der Ruhr
- Anni Schönhuber as Frau im Hotel
- Erich Padalewski as Stotternder Kellner
- Rex Gildo as himself
- Henning Heers as Paul Kippenroth
- Evi Kent as Evi
- Irene Mann as Jutta

== Bibliography ==
- Von Dassanowsky, Robert (2005). Austrian Cinema: A History. Jefferson, NC: McFarland. ISBN 978-1-4766-2147-0.
