= Dance with Me Into the Morning =

1962 film

- Directed by: Peter Dörre
- Written by: Franz Arndt; Daniela Holl
- Produced by: Karl Spiehs
- Starring: Gerhard Wendland; Guggi Löwinger; Rex Gildo
- Cinematography: Hanns Matula
- Music by: Johannes Fehring
- Production company: Wiener Stadthalle-Station Betriebs-und Produktions
- Distributed by: Nora-Filmverleih
- Release date: 7 September 1962
- Running time: 89 minutes
- Country: Austria
- Language: German

Dance with Me Into the Morning (German: Tanze mit mir in den Morgen) is a 1962 Austrian musical film directed by Peter Dörre and starring Gerhard Wendland, Guggi Löwinger and Rex Gildo.

The film's sets were designed by the art director Sepp Rothaur. It was shot at the Rosenhügel Studios in Vienna.

== Main cast ==
- Gerhard Wendland as himself
- Guggi Löwinger as Franziska Ebeseder
- Rex Gildo as Stefan Breuer
- Paul Hörbiger as Johann Ebeseder
- Oskar Sima as Franz Biedermann
- Marianne Schönauer as C. Werner
- Hans Richter as Detektiv
- Evi Kent as Daisy Biedermann
- Udo Jürgens as Max Kainz
- Rudolf Carl as Wenzel Kainz
- Joseph Egger as Kapitän Zebel
- Lotte Lang as Amalia Strassmeier
- Erich Padalewski as Blumenhändler Georg Hager
- Fred Berhoff as Architekt Thomas

== Bibliography ==
- Robert Von Dassanowsky. Austrian Cinema: A History. McFarland, 2005.
