= Die Abenteuer des braven Soldaten Schwejk =

- Also known as: The Adventures of the Good Soldier Schwejk
- Genre: Comedy, Adventure
- Created by: Wolfgang Liebeneier
- Based on: The Good Soldier Švejk by Jaroslav Hašek
- Starring: Fritz Muliar; Ludwig Hirsch; Kurt Jaggberg; Heinz Marecek; Luzi Neudecker; Heinz Petters; Herbert Prikopa
- Country of origin: Austria, West Germany
- Original language: German
- No. of series: 2
- No. of episodes: 13 in 2 Series

Production
- Producers: Telefilm AG; Neue Thalia Film; TV 60
- Running time: 59 Minutes per Episode
- Production companies: ORF, ZDF

Original release
- Network: ZDF
- Release: 6 February 1972 – 1977

Die Abenteuer des braven Soldaten Schwejk (transl. The adventures of the good soldier Schwejk) is a television series produced by the ORF and ZDF and directed by Wolfgang Liebeneiner. It is based on the novel Der brave Soldat Schwejk by Jaroslav Hašek and was broadcast from 1972 to 1977. Fritz Muliar played the leading role.

== Plot ==
The Bohemian dog salesman Josef Schwejk (Fritz Muliar) is someone, who enjoys life to the full and cheats his way through life, in Prague at the start of the 20th century, when Prague was a part of the Austro-Hungarian Empire and before any World Wars had taken place. He was referred to publicly as an idiot who registered as a soldier when there was a greater chance of WW1 breaking out. Here he survives frequent hair-raising adventures that drive some of the people he meets into desperation.

== Cast and Character ==
| Actor | Character | Appearance in episodes | | | | | | | | | | | | |
| Actor | Character | 1 | 2 | 3 | 4 | 5 | 6 | 7 | 8 | 9 | 10 | 11 | 12 | 13 |
|---|---|---|---|---|---|---|---|---|---|---|---|---|---|---|
| Fritz Muliar | Josef Schwejk | | | | | | | | | | | | | |
| Helli Servi | Frau Müller | | | | | | | | | | | | | |
| Rudolf Rösner | Palivec | | | | | | | | | | | | | |
| Heinrich Schweiger | Bretschneider | | | | | | | | | | | | | |
| Bibiane Zeller | Frau Palivec | | | | | | | | | | | | | |
| Brigitte Swoboda | Marie | | | | | | | | | | | | | |
| Kurt Sowinetz | Feldkurat Otto Katz | | | | | | | | | | | | | |
| Heinz Petters | Oberleutnant Lukasch | | | | | | | | | | | | | |
| Kurt Jaggberg | Feldwebel Wanek | | | | | | | | | | | | | |
| Heinz Marecek | Marek | | | | | | | | | | | | | |
| Franz Gary | Woditschka | | | | | | | | | | | | | |
| Herbert Prikopa | Baloun | | | | | | | | | | | | | |
| Rainer von Artenfels | Leutnant Dub | | | | | | | | | | | | | |
| Robert Dietl | Polizeichef | | | | | | | | | | | | | |
| Harry Hornisch | Zwerschina | | | | | | | | | | | | | |
| Harald Serafin | Fedor | | | | | | | | | | | | | |
| Gerda Prott | Nina | | | | | | | | | | | | | |
| Lieselotte Plauensteiner | Dunja | | | | | | | | | | | | | |
| Liane Pech | Natascha | | | | | | | | | | | | | |
| Ludwig Hirsch | Horschin | | | | | | | | | | | | | |
| Gerhard Steffen | Krakor | | | | | | | | | | | | | |

== The creators of the TV series ==
- Director - Wolfgang Liebeneiner
- Script - Eckart Hachfeld, Jaroslav Hašek, Grete Reiner
- Producer - F.K. Wittich, Werner Swossil, Jörg Mauthe
- Operator - Götz Neumann, Siegfried Hold
- Music - Johannes Martin Dürr
- Artist - Wolf Witzemann, Edith Almoslino
- Installation - Annemarie Rokoss, Karl Aulitzky

== Background ==
Wolfgang Liebeneiner also directed Die Schatzinsel, which was broadcast as a four-part series around Christmas. Through its success and because he had also filmed "Schwejks Flegeljahre" (transl. Schweijk's years of being a brat) with Peter Alexander in the leading role, Liebeneiner was encouraged to produce the series.

It was a foregone conclusion that Fritz Muliar would play the role of Schwejk. Fritz Muliar was even greatly acknowledged by Heinz Rühmann for his role, who had already played Schwejk in the movie of the same name.

The first season consisting of six episodes was already a big success in 1972. However three years passed until the second season which had seven new episodes could be produced because people who were involved were not available.

Filming took place in Krems an der Donau (in the series Prague), on the shipyard of Korneuburg (in the series marine ammunition storage of Trieste) as well as in the Weinviertel "wine quarter" (amongst others at the Karnabrunn train station along the line of Korneuburg-Hohenau).

== Home release ==
A DVD with all 13 episodes of the series has been available for purchase since the 17 November 2008.

== See also ==
- List of Austrian television series
- List of German television series
