= The Turkish Cucumbers =

- Directed by: Rolf Olsen
- Written by: Peter Loos; Rolf Olsen; Gunther Philipp
- Produced by: K. Gordon Murray
- Starring: Gunther Philipp; Oskar Sima; Susi Nicoletti
- Cinematography: Walter Tuch
- Edited by: Karl Aulitzky
- Music by: Werner Scharfenberger
- Production company: Bavaria Film
- Distributed by: Bavaria Film
- Release date: 22 March 1962
- Running time: 96 minutes
- Country: West Germany
- Language: German

The Turkish Cucumbers (German: Die türkischen Gurken) is a 1962 West German comedy film directed by Rolf Olsen and starring Gunther Philipp, Oskar Sima and Susi Nicoletti. It was shot at the Bavaria Studios in Munich. The film's sets were designed by the art directors Hertha Hareiter and Otto Pischinger.

== Synopsis ==
A fruit and vegetable wholesaler who does a great deal of business with the Middle East is disturbed to discover that one of his clients has gifted him a harem. He tries to keep this secret from his wife by pretending that the new arrivals are Turkish cucumbers, but she becomes increasingly suspicious.

== Cast ==
- Gunther Philipp as Siegfried König, Zahnarzt
- Oskar Sima as Oskar Schnabel
- Susi Nicoletti as Susanne, seine Gattin
- Ruth Stephan as Ruthlinde, beider Tochter
- Walter Gross as Theo-Maria Neumann
- Hubert von Meyerinck as Rubin y Soliman
- Ernst Waldbrunn as Pospischil, Detektiv
- Willy Schultes as Mittermeyer
- Monica Berger as Suleika, Haremsdame
- Dora Carras as Rosa, Dienstmädchen
- Sergio Casmai as Niki, Ponys Verehrer
- Gabriele Clonisch as Pony König
- Angela Hartmann as Yasmina, Haremsdame
- Harry Hertzsch as Standesbeamter
- Angelina Monti as Faida, Haremsdame
- Charly Mueller as Engelberg Grün, Fabrikant
- Ilse Petri as Petra, seine Frau
- Edith Peters as Mahila, Haremsdame
- Barbro Svensson as Lill
- Brigitte Wentzel as Pamina, Haremsdame

== Bibliography ==
- Chrys Ingraham. White Weddings: Romancing Heterosexuality in Popular Culture. Routledge, 1999.
