= Our Crazy Aunts =

1961 film

- Directed by: Rolf Olsen
- Written by: Rolf Olsen; Gunther Philipp
- Produced by: Rudolf Travnicek; Adolf Eder; Karl Spiehs
- Starring: Gunther Philipp; Gus Backus; Vivi Bach
- Cinematography: Walter Tuch
- Edited by: Karl Aulitzky
- Music by: Erwin Halletz
- Production companies: Wiener Stadthalle-Station Betriebs-und Produktions; MCS Film
- Distributed by: Deutsche Filmvertriebs
- Release date: 23 November 1961
- Running time: 100 minutes
- Country: Austria
- Language: German

Our Crazy Aunts (German: Unsere tollen Tanten) is a 1961 Austrian comedy film directed by Rolf Olsen and starring Gunther Philipp, Gus Backus, and Vivi Bach. It was followed by two sequels, Our Crazy Nieces and Our Crazy Aunts in the South Seas.

The film's sets were designed by the art director Felix Smetana.

== Cast ==
- Gunther Philipp as Max Rettich
- Gus Backus as Gus
- Vivi Bach as Susi Güden
- Bill Ramsey as Bill
- Udo Jürgens as Pit van Rees
- Franz Muxeneder as Ludwig
- Walter Müller as Dr. Emil Rautenstrauch
- Kurt Großkurth as Herrmann Schmatzer
- George Dimu as Giorgio
- Henning Heers as Eddi
- Ernst Hinterseer as Andreas Kargel
- Harry Hardt as Generaldirektor
- Ernst Waldbrunn as Vater Güden
- Rolf Olsen as Bruno Hatschek
- Trude Herr as Edeltraut
- Hannelore Bollmann as Inge Eckmann
- Lotte Lang as Martha von Hahn
- Ilse Peternell as Liesl Busch, Wirtin
- Evi Kent as Evi
- Sieglinde Thomas as Sieglinde
- Frances Martin as Francis
- Ines Taddio as Inez
- Lizzi Kellner as Petzi

== Bibliography ==
- Von Dassanowsky, Robert (2005). Austrian Cinema: A History. Jefferson, NC: McFarland. ISBN 978-1-4766-2147-0.
