= Rex Gildo =

German singer

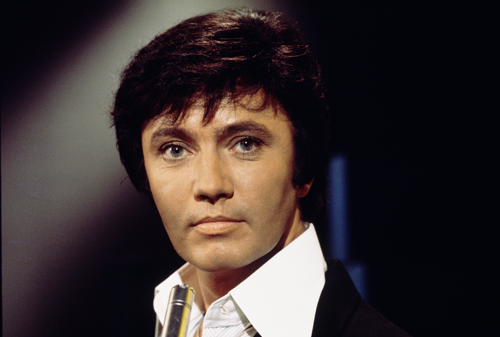
Gildo in 1975

Rex Gildo (formerly Alexander Gildo, born Ludwig Franz Hirtreiter; 2 July 1936 – 26 October 1999) was a German singer of Schlager ballads who reached the height of his popularity in the 1960s and 1970s, selling over 25 million records and starring in film and television roles.

== Early life ==
Gildo was born Ludwig Franz Hirtreiter in Straubing, Bavaria. In the mid-1950s, he adopted the stage name Alexander Gildo, later shortening it to Rex Gildo. He claimed for many years to have been a member of the Regensburger Domspatzen choir before attending acting school; however, a documentary on German television a decade after his death in 2009 revealed that in fact he had worked in a decorating apprenticeship before he met Fred Miekley, who would become his manager/longtime companion.

== Career ==
Gildo's first performance was with the Munich Kammerspiele theatre group in 1956, but he quickly moved into television and film, as well as performing as a singer, duetting with Danish singer Gitte Haenning as "Gitte & Rex". His most popular songs, such as Speedy Gonzales (1962), Goodbye Susanna (1965) and Fiesta Mexicana (1972), were sung during the 1960s and 1970s in Germany. His music and films sold well there but less so abroad. He also starred in his own television program, Gestatten – Rex Gildo.

During the 1980s and 1990s, Gildo's popularity decreased. His appearances were mainly at folk festivals, shopping centres and other similar venues; he was also reported to have problems with alcoholism. His final performance, on the day of his suicide attempt, was in front of more than 3000 people at a furniture shop outside Frankfurt.

== Personal life and death ==
In 1974, Gildo married his cousin Marion Ohlsen in a lavender marriage. The couple had no children and separated in 1990. After his death, it was reported that he was gay and had a relationship with Dave Klingeberg, his secretary, with whom he lived for 7 years.

Gildo died in 1999, aged 63, having spent three days in an artificially-induced coma after attempting suicide by jumping from the window of his apartment building. He was said to have been suffering from psychological problems.

== Discography ==
- Das Ende der Liebe (Tell Laura I love You)/Minnetonka Mädi (1959)
- Sieben Wochen nach Bombay (1960)
- Yes My Darling (1960), together with Conny Froboess
- Speedy Gonzales (1962)
- Zwei blaue Vergißmeinnicht (1963)
- Vom Stadtpark die Laternen (1963), together with Gitte Haenning
- Zwei auf einer Bank (1964), together with Gitte Haenning
- Jetzt dreht die Welt sich nur um dich (1964), together with Gitte Haenning
- Hokuspokus (1964), together with Gitte Haenning
- Dein Glück ist mein Glück (1965), together with Gitte Haenning
- Goodbye Susanna (1965)
- Augen wie zwei Sterne (1966)
- Der Mond hat seine Schuldigkeit getan (1967)
- Komm, Laß Uns Tanzen (1967)
- Schlager-Rendezvous Mit Rex Gildo (1967)
- Ein Ring aus Gold (1968)
- Rex Gildo's Disco Club With Jo Ment's Happy Sound – 28 Party Hits For Dancing (1968)
- Dondolo (1969)
- Rex (1969)
- Memories (1971)
- Fiesta Mexicana (1972)
- Der Sommer ist vorbei (1973)
- Marie der letzte Tanz (1974)
- Der letzte Sirtaki (1975)
- Küsse von dir (1976, German version of Save Your Kisses for Me)
- Love Is in the Air (1978)
- Sally komm wieder (1978)
- Saragossa (1979)
- Holly ho Havanna (1979)
- La Bandita (1980)
- Wenn ich je deine Liebe verlier (1981)
- Und sie hieß Julie (1983)
- Und plötzlich ist es wieder da (1983)
- Dir fehlt Liebe (1984)
- Rendezvous auf spanisch (1984)
- Mamma mia (1985)
- Du ich lieb Dich (1985)
- Was ist schon eine Nacht (1986)
- Mexicanische Nacht (1989)
- Margarita (1991)

== Selected filmography ==
- Immer wenn der Tag beginnt (1957), as Max Clement
- Schmutziger Engel (1958), as Peter Utesch
- Wenn die Conny mit dem Peter (1958), as Gerd Weidner
- Hula-Hopp, Conny (1959), as Billy Newman
- Ja, so ein Mädchen mit 16 (1959), as Rex
- My Niece Doesn't Do That (1960), as Robert
- Am Sonntag will mein Süßer mit mir segeln gehn (1961), as Tommy
- Dance with Me Into the Morning (1962), as Stefan Breuer
- Café Oriental (1962), as Himself
- Don't Fool with Me (1963), as Billie Bill
- Und wenn der ganze Schnee verbrennt (1963), as Rolf
- Apartmentzauber (1963), as Karl Fischer
- The World Revolves Around You (1964), as Martin Fischer
- Tausend Takte Übermut (1965), as Rick Tanner
- What Is the Matter with Willi? (1970), as Frankie Kuhländer
- Unsere Tante ist das Letzte (1973), as Martin Klamm

As himself

- Hit Parade 1960 (1960)
- Marina (1960)
- O sole mio (1960)
- Die Hazy Osterwald Story (1961)
- Café Oriental (1962)
- Our Crazy Nieces (1963)
- Maskenball bei Scotland Yard (1963)
- Otto ist auf Frauen scharf (1968)
