= Uncle Satchmo's Lullaby =

Song by Louis Armstrong
- Written: Erwin Halletz; Olaf Bradtke

"Uncle Satchmo's Lullaby" (also known under its German title "Onkel Satchmo's Lullaby") is a 1959 song, written by Erwin Halletz and Olaf Bradtke, and sung by Louis Armstrong and German singer Gabriele Clonisch, better known as Gabriele, who was 12 years old at the time.

It was recorded on May 20, 1959, in Berlin and used in the German musical film La Paloma (1959). Armstrong sings his lyrics in English, while Gabriele sings her lyrics in German. The song became an international hit in 1959–1960.
