= Wolf Witzemann =

Austrian set designer

- Born: 29 May 1924; Feldkirch, Vorarlberg, Austria
- Died: 27 July 1991 (aged 67); Munich, Bavaria, Germany
- Occupation: Art Director
- Years active: 1954–1982 (film & TV)

Wolf Witzemann (1924–1991) was an Austrian art director. He designed sets for a number of films and television productions.

== Selected filmography ==
- The Last Bridge (1954)
- The Last Ten Days (1955)
- Mozart (1955)
- Forest Liesel (1956)
- Imperial and Royal Field Marshal (1956)
- Engagement at Wolfgangsee (1956)
- War of the Maidens (1957)
- Dort in der Wachau (1957)
- Candidates for Marriage (1958)
- Sebastian Kneipp (1958)
- My Daughter Patricia (1959)
- Final Accord (1960)
- Frauen in Teufels Hand (1960)
- Napoleon II, the Eagle (1961)
- The Elusive Corporal (1962)
- Our Crazy Nieces (1963)
- Don't Fool with Me (1963)
- Dog Eat Dog (1964)
- DM-Killer (1965)
- The Fountain of Love (1966)
- Shameless (1968)
- Die Abenteuer des braven Soldaten Schwejk (1972, TV series)

== Bibliography ==
- Silberman, Marc. German Cinema: Texts in Context. Wayne State University Press, 1995.
