= Hello Taxi =

1958 film directed by Hermann Kugelstadt

- Directed by: Hermann Kugelstadt
- Written by: Theodor Ottawa
- Produced by: Ernest Müller; August Rieger
- Starring: Hans Moser; Paul Hörbiger; Oskar Sima
- Cinematography: Walter Tuch
- Edited by: Luise Dreyer-Sachsenberg
- Music by: Hans Lang
- Production company: Schönbrunn-Film
- Distributed by: Union-Film
- Release date: 11 April 1958
- Running time: 94 minutes
- Country: Austria
- Language: German

Hello Taxi (German: Hallo Taxi) is a 1958 Austrian comedy film directed by Hermann Kugelstadt and starring Hans Moser, Paul Hörbiger and Oskar Sima.

It was shot at the Schönbrunn Studios in Vienna.

== Plot ==
Two old friends in Vienna, both carriage drivers, fall out when one of them buys a modern taxi.

== Main cast ==
- Hans Moser as Leopold Gruber
- Paul Hörbiger as Franz Schwarzl
- Oskar Sima as Kommerzienrat Schellnegger
- Lucie Englisch as Adele Schellnegger
- Gerlinde Locker as Lisa
- Walter Kohut as Herbert Gerlinger
- Brigitte Antonius as Pipsi
- Jürgen Holl as Karl Schellnegger

== Bibliography ==
- Bergfelder, Tim & Bock, Hans-Michael. The Concise Cinegraph: Encyclopedia of German. Berghahn Books, 2009.
