= War of the Maidens (film) =

1957 film directed by Hermann Kugelstadt

- Mady Rahl in a scene from the film
- Directed by: Hermann Kugelstadt
- Written by: Hans Matscher (novel); Rolf Olsen; Kurt Nachmann
- Produced by: Alfred Lehr
- Starring: Oskar Sima; Kurt Heintel; Mady Rahl
- Cinematography: Walter Tuch
- Edited by: Luise Dreyer-Sachsenberg
- Music by: Karl Götz; Hans Hagen
- Production companies: Österreichische Film; Schönbrunn-Film
- Distributed by: Sascha Film (Austria); Neue Filmverleih (W.Germany)
- Release date: 8 August 1957
- Running time: 86 minutes
- Countries: Austria; West Germany
- Language: German

War of the Maidens (German: Der Jungfrauenkrieg) is a 1957 Austrian-German comedy film directed by Hermann Kugelstadt and starring Oskar Sima, Kurt Heintel and Mady Rahl. It was shot at the Schönbrunn Studios in Vienna and at the studios in Salzburg. The film's sets were designed by the art director Wolf Witzemann.

== Cast ==
- Oskar Sima as Franz Rössmayer, Wirt
- Kurt Heintel as Martin Jöcher., Holzknecht
- Mady Rahl as Monika, Kellnerin
- Heinrich Gretler as Kaslatterer, Bürgermeister
- Gerlinde Locker as Lena Feldhofer
- Rudolf Carl as Aicher, Sägemüller
- Lucie Englisch as Frau Aicher
- Gustl Gstettenbaur as Pecher
- Lotte Ledl as Reinstadler, Krämerin
- Sepp Rist as Feldhofer, Großbauer
- Brigitte Antonius as Rosa Stecher
- Walter Janssen as Pfarrer
- Ruth Winter as Franzi, Kellnerin
- Walter Varndal as Andergasser, Schneider
- Gert Türmer as Zischek
- Felix Czerny
- Hardo Friemel
- Walter Hirt
- Lola Urban-Kneidinger
- Eva Gaigg
- Heinz Rohn
- Wilfried Steiner
- Hubert Kiurina
- Ursula Wondrak
- Armin Dahlen as Gustav Kugler, Frächter

== Bibliography ==
- Robert von Dassanowsky. Austrian Cinema: A History. McFarland, 2005.
