= Who Wants to Sleep? =

1965 film

- Directed by: Rolf Thiele; Axel von Ambesser; Alfred Weidenmann
- Written by: Paul Hengge; Kurt Nachmann; Herbert Reinecker; Walter Schneider
- Produced by: Karl Spiehs
- Starring: Curd Jürgens; Anita Ekberg; Catherine Deneuve
- Cinematography: Wolf Wirth
- Edited by: Annemarie Reisetbauer
- Music by: Erwin Halletz
- Production company: Intercontinental Film
- Distributed by: Constantin Film
- Release date: 30 September 1965
- Running time: 93 minutes
- Country: Austria
- Language: German

Who Wants to Sleep? (German: Das Liebeskarussell) is a 1965 Austrian comedy film directed by Rolf Thiele, Axel von Ambesser and Alfred Weidenmann and starring Curd Jürgens, Anita Ekberg, and Catherine Deneuve. It consists of a series of episodic tales about the relationships of the characters.

It was shot at the Sievering Studios in Vienna. The film's sets were designed by the art director Herta Hareiter.

== Cast ==
- Curd Jürgens as Stefan von Cramer
- Nadja Tiller as Sybill von Cramer
- Ivan Desny as Baron Rudolf
- Letícia Román as Paulette
- Gert Fröbe as Emil Claasen
- Catherine Deneuve as Angela Claasen
- Walter Buschhoff as Doctor
- Friedrich von Thun as Heitzmann
- Ingeborg Wall as Housekeeper
- Heinz Rühmann as Professor Hellberg
- Johanna von Koczian as Dorothea Parker
- Richard Münch as Walter Morten
- Anita Ekberg as Lolita Young
- Peter Alexander as Peter Sommer
- Axel von Ambesser as Ronald

== Bibliography ==
- Betz, Mark (2009). Beyond the Subtitle: Remapping European Art Cinema. Minneapolis: University of Minnesota Press. ISBN 978-0-8166-4035-5.
