= Shocking Asia =

1974 German-Hong Kong documentary by Rolf Olsen

- Directed by: Rolf Olsen
- Written by: Rolf Olsen; Ingeborg Stein Steinbach
- Produced by: Wolfgang von Schiber
- Music by: Erwin Halletz
- Release date: 1974
- Running time: 94 minutes
- Countries: West Germany; Hong Kong
- Language: English

Shocking Asia is a 1974 mondo documentary film directed by Rolf Olsen and written by Olsen with Ingeborg Stein Steinbach. A co-production between West Germany and Hong Kong, the film was banned in Finland due to its graphic content. A sequel titled Shocking Asia II: The Last Taboos was released in 1985.

== Content ==
As with most other films of similar nature (such as Faces of Death and Traces of Death), Shocking Asia does not follow a traditional narrative structure, instead neglecting plot for images and video footage of bizarre and macabre situations such as animal cruelty, strange rituals, footage of deformed children and a sex change operation. Most of the clips used are claimed to be real, although this has yet to be verified.

C. Spencer Yeh's "Shocking Asia" is a sequel which was on view at Empty Gallery, Hong Kong, in February 2018.
