= Walter Tuch =

Austrian cinematographer

- Born: 2 December 1913; Aussig, Bohemia, Austro-Hungarian Empire
- Died: 27 March 1969 (aged 55); Hamburg, West Germany
- Occupation: Cinematographer
- Years active: 1936–1969 (film & TV)

Walter Tuch (1913–1969) was an Austrian cinematographer. He was active in both Austrian and West German cinema, and later in television. He was the younger brother of actress Jane Tilden.

== Selected filmography ==
- Flowers from Nice (1936)
- Capers (1937)
- Your Heart Is My Homeland (1953)
- A Night in Venice (1953)
- The Forester of the Silver Wood (1954)
- Goetz von Berlichingen (1955)
- The Dairymaid of St. Kathrein (1955)
- Engagement at Wolfgangsee (1956)
- Imperial and Royal Field Marshal (1956)
- War of the Maidens (1957)
- So ein Millionär hat's schwer (1958)
- Hello Taxi (1958)
- Girls for the Mambo-Bar (1959)
- Guitars Sound Softly Through the Night (1960)
- Our Crazy Aunts (1961)
- The Cry of the Wild Geese (1961)
- The Turkish Cucumbers (1962)
- No Kissing Under Water (1962)
- Two Bavarians in Bonn (1962)
- Manhattan Night of Murder (1965)

== Bibliography ==
- Fritsche, Maria. Homemade Men In Postwar Austrian Cinema: Nationhood, Genre and Masculinity . Berghahn Books, 2013.
- Von Dassanowsky, Robert. Austrian Cinema: A History. McFarland, 2005.
