= Rolf Olsen (actor) =

Austrian actor and filmmaker (1919–1998)

- Born: 26 December 1919; Vienna, Austria
- Died: 3 April 1998 (aged 78); Munich, Germany
- Occupations: Actor; Screenwriter; Film director
- Years active: 1947–1990

Rolf Olsen (26 December 1919 – 3 April 1998) was an Austrian actor, screenwriter and film director. He appeared in 60 films between 1949 and 1990. He also wrote for 51 films and directed a further 33 between 1947 and 1990. He was born in Vienna, Austria, and died in Munich, Germany.

== Selected filmography ==
- The Three from the Filling Station (1955 – actor)
- My Aunt, Your Aunt (1956)
- Bonjour Kathrin (1956 – actor)
- Emperor's Ball (1956 – actor)
- War of the Maidens (1957)
- Love, Girls and Soldiers (1958)
- Girls for the Mambo-Bar (1959)
- Mikosch, the Pride of the Company (1959 – actor)
- Crime Tango (1960)
- Big Request Concert (1960 – writer, actor)
- Queen of the Pirates (1960 – writer)
- Our Crazy Aunts (1961)
- The Turkish Cucumbers (1962)
- No Kissing Under Water (1962)
- The Sweet Life of Count Bobby (1962)
- Our Crazy Nieces (1963)
- Our Crazy Aunts in the South Seas (1964)
- The Last Ride to Santa Cruz (1964 – director)
- Legend of a Gunfighter (1964 – director)
- Call of the Forest (1965)
- Call Girls of Frankfurt (1966 – director)
- Once a Greek (1966)
- Killer's Carnival (1966 – writer)
- Blood at Sundown (1966 – writer)
- Das Rasthaus der grausamen Puppen (1967 - director)
- When Night Falls on the Reeperbahn (1967 - director)
- The Doctor of St. Pauli (1968 – director)
- On the Reeperbahn at Half Past Midnight (1969 – director)
- The Young Tigers of Hong Kong (1969 - writer)
- When You're With Me (1970)
- That Can't Shake Our Willi! (1970 – director)
- Hotel by the Hour (1970 – director)
- The Priest of St. Pauli (1970 – director)
- Captain Typhoon (1971 – director)
- Cry of the Black Wolves (1972 - writer)
- Bloody Friday (1972 – director)
- Shocking Asia (1974 – writer)
- Journey Into the Beyond (1975 – director)
- Love Hotel in Tyrol (1978 - actor)
- Shocking Asia II: The Last Taboos (1985 – writer)
