= Shocking Asia II: The Last Taboos =

1985 German-Hong Kong film by Rolf Olsen

Shocking Asia
- DVD cover
- Directed by: Rolf Olsen
- Written by: Rolf Olsen
- Produced by: Wolfgang von Schiber
- Release date: 1985
- Running time: 91 minutes
- Countries: West Germany; Hong Kong
- Language: English

Shocking Asia II: The Last Taboos is a 1985 mondo documentary film written and directed by Rolf Olsen. A German-Hong Kong co-production, the film is the sequel to 1974's Shocking Asia. It was followed by a sequel Shocking Asia III: After Dark in 1995.

== Content ==
The film has no traditional plot, instead showing a series of shocking and disturbing video clips, primarily from Asia. Some content prescribed includes footage of cockfighting, crippled people born with deformities, spiritual rituals, bull fighting and bizarre sexual acts.
