= Don't Fool with Me =

1963 film

- Directed by: Kurt Nachmann
- Written by: Daniela Holl
- Produced by: Karl Spiehs
- Starring: Adrian Hoven; Wera Frydtberg; Paul Hörbiger
- Cinematography: Hanns Matula
- Edited by: Hermine Diethelm
- Music by: Johannes Fehring
- Production company: Wiener Stadthalle-Station Betriebs-und Produktionsgesellschaft
- Distributed by: Columbia-Bavaria Film
- Release date: 15 January 1963
- Running time: 91 minutes
- Country: Austria
- Language: German

Don't Fool with Me (German: Sing, aber spiel nicht mit mir) is a 1963 Austrian musical comedy film directed by Kurt Nachmann and starring Adrian Hoven, Wera Frydtberg and Paul Hörbiger.

It was shot at the Sievering Studios in Vienna using Eastmancolor. The film's sets were designed by the art director Wolf Witzemann.

== Cast ==
- Adrian Hoven as Modeschöpfer, Maler und Lehrer Raul Thorsten
- Wera Frydtberg as Schwester Nina Thorsten
- Karin Heske as Schülerin Susi Berger
- Paul Hörbiger as Raimund Valentin
- Rex Gildo as Sänger Billie Bill
- Peter Vogel as Gag-Man Hans Rabe
- Hans Richter as Gag-Man Klaus Fuchs
- Lou Van Burg as Showmaster und Sänger Lou van Burg
- Carmela Corren as Juanita
- Brigitte Wentzel as Charlotte
- Oskar Sima as Direktor Sendelmohn
- Brigitte Franke as Sekretärin Fräulein Brigitte
- Erich Padalewski as Ferdi Zippel
- Sissy Löwinger as Pipsi Parker
- Kurt Nachmann as Cafetier Schebesta
- Audrey Arno as Sängerin Audrey Arno
- Hannelore Auer as Sängerin Hannelore Auer
- Das Jochen Brauer Sextett as Themselves - Musician
- Les Chakachas as Themselves - Musician
- Sacha Distel as Sänger Sacha Distel
- Angèle Durand as Sängerin Angèle Durand
- Sergio Franchi as Sänger Sergio Franchi
- Ted Herold as Sänger Ted Herold
- Trude Herr as Sängerin Trude Herr
- Peter Hinnen as Sänger Peter Hinnen
- Bill Ramsey as Sänger Bill Ramsey
- Willi Schmid as Sänger Willi Schmid
- Gerhard Wendland as Sänger Gerhard Wendland

== Bibliography ==
- Von Dassanowsky, Robert. Austrian Cinema: A History. McFarland, 2005.
