= The Great Happiness =

1967 film

- Directed by: Franz Antel
- Written by: Kurt Nachmann
- Produced by: Franz Antel; Kurt Kodal
- Starring: Marika Kilius; Hans-Jürgen Bäumler; Gunther Philipp; Uschi Glas
- Cinematography: Konrad Bruckner; Siegfried Hold
- Edited by: Paula Dvorak
- Music by: Johannes Fehring
- Production company: Neue Delta Filmproduktion
- Distributed by: Constantin Film
- Release date: 15 September 1967
- Running time: 100 minutes
- Country: Austria
- Language: German

The Great Happiness (German: Das große Glück) is a 1967 Austrian musical comedy film directed by Franz Antel and starring Marika Kilius, Hans-Jürgen Bäumler, Gunther Philipp and Uschi Glas. It was shot at studios in Vienna and on location around Rome. The film's sets were designed by the art director Otto Pischinger. It is a sequel to the 1964 film The Great Skate.

== Cast ==
- Marika Kilius as Herself, Marika Kilius
- Hans-Jürgen Bäumler as Himself, Hans-Jürgen Bäumler
- Gunther Philipp as Wallace, Manager
- Uschi Glas as Lilo
- Theo Lingen as Ronald
- Gerd Vespermann as Teddy Helgers
- Edith Hancke as Mrs. Kleinschmitt
- Dunja Rajter as Adelaide
- Fritz Tillmann as Nic Parnassis
- Franz Muxeneder as Comedian at Vienna Ice Show
- C.W. Fernbach as Franke
- Raoul Retzer as Owner of Tivoli Bar
- Toni Sailer as Toni Sailer
- Scilla Gabel as Molly Pink

== Bibliography ==
- Bock, Hans-Michael & Bergfelder, Tim. The Concise Cinegraph: Encyclopaedia of German Cinema. Berghahn Books, 2009.
- Von Dassanowsky, Robert. Austrian Cinema: A History. McFarland, 2005.
