= The World Revolves Around You =

1964 film

- Directed by: Wolfgang Liebeneiner
- Written by: Janne Furch; Paul Terpe
- Produced by: Heinz Pollak; Karl Spiehs
- Starring: Gitte Hænning; Rex Gildo; Claus Biederstaedt
- Cinematography: Franz Xaver Lederle
- Edited by: Annemarie Reisetbauer
- Music by: Heinz Gietz
- Production company: Wiener Stadthalle-Station Betriebs-und Produktionsgesellschaft
- Distributed by: Constantin Film
- Release date: 11 September 1964
- Running time: 93 minutes
- Country: Austria
- Language: German

The World Revolves Around You (German: Jetzt dreht die Welt sich nur um dich) is a 1964 Austrian musical film directed by Wolfgang Liebeneiner and starring Gitte Hænning, Rex Gildo and Claus Biederstaedt.

It was shot at the Rosenhügel Studios in Vienna and on location in Heidelberg. The film's sets were designed by the art director Leo Metzenbauer. It was produced with the backing of the major German distributor Constantin Film.

== Synopsis ==
Lilian, the daughter of a Danish newspaper magnate and aspiring singer, returns home from boarding school in Switzerland. Frustrated by her father's refusal to let her pursue a musical career, she flees in her aunt's car to Germany, ending up in Heidelberg where she meets Martin, a student.

== Cast ==
- Gitte Hænning as Lilian Andreesen
- Rex Gildo as Martin Fischer, Student
- Claus Biederstaedt as Peter Winters, reporter
- Ruth Stephan as Henriette Andreesen, Lilians Tante
- Mara Lane as Baby Bird
- Gunther Philipp as Stefan Vogt
- Evi Kent as Trude Schnäbele, Sekretärin
- Klaus Dahlen as Fritz Unverzagt, Martins Freund
- Gustav Knuth as Holger Andreesen, Lilians Vater
- Hans Söhnker as Richard Fischer, Martins Vater
- Wolfgang Liebeneiner as Universitäts-Professor
- Raoul Retzer as Schädler

== Bibliography ==
- Von Dassanowsky, Robert. Austrian Cinema: A History. McFarland, 2005.
