= No Kissing Under Water =

1960 film

- Directed by: Erich Heindl
- Written by: Rolf Olsen; Herbert Prikopa; Edi Ulrich
- Produced by: Erich Heindl; Gerry Hytha
- Starring: Gunther Philipp; Evi Kent; Rolf Olsen
- Cinematography: Erich Heindl; Gerry Hytha; Hans Heinz Theyer; Walter Tuch
- Music by: Gerhard Heinz
- Production company: Projektograph Film
- Distributed by: Neue Film Allianz
- Release date: 30 November 1962
- Running time: 82 minutes
- Country: Austria
- Language: German

No Kissing Under Water (German: Unter Wasser küßt man nicht) is a 1962 Austrian comedy film directed by Erich Heindl and starring Gunther Philipp, Evi Kent and Rolf Olsen.

The film's sets were designed by the art director Hans Zehetner. Location shooting took place in Greece and Italy.

== Synopsis ==
The owner of a large bank has funded an underwater expedition in the Mediterranean but is angry when he discovers that his daughter has joined the expedition. He hires an incompetent private detective to track her down and bring her home to Austria.

== Cast ==
- Gunther Philipp as Lutz Blitz
- Evi Kent as Elfie, daughter of the bank director
- Gerry Hytha as Expeditionsleiter
- Rolf Olsen as Lagopoulos
- Herbert Prikopa as Hafenmeister
- Silvana Sansoni as Elfie, Expeditionsteilnehmerin
- Fritz Heller as Kaiser, Präsident der CDF-Bank

== Bibliography ==
- Von Dassanowsky, Robert. Austrian Cinema: A History. McFarland, 2005.
