= Gitte Hænning =

Danish actress (born 1946)

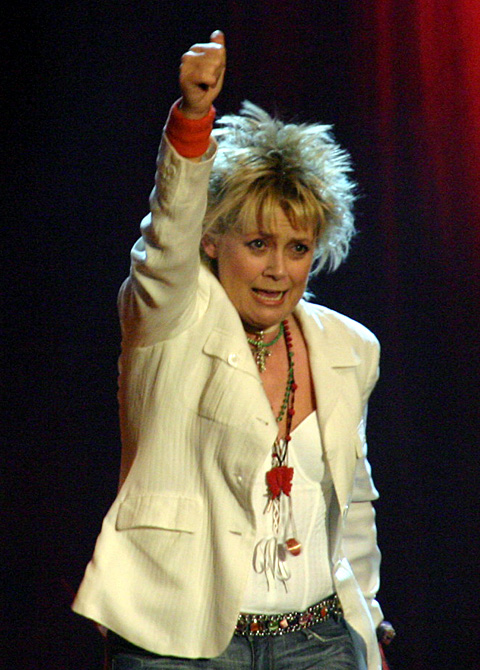
- Hænning in 2005
- Born: 29 June 1946 (age 79); Århus, Denmark
- Occupation: Singer/actor

Gitte Hænning (born 29 June 1946) is a Danish singer and film actress, who rose to fame as a child star in the 1950s.

She was known primarily mononymously (without a surname) in Europe. She moved to Sweden in 1958. Her first hit in Swedish was "Tror du jag ljuger" from 1961. As a teenager, Gitte sang popular hits in German, English, Italian (4 songs: "Amo Johnny", "Parla", "La mela", and "Il ricordo", recorded on two singles), and Danish. She had five different number one hits in three countries: one in Denmark, two in Sweden, and two in Germany. Her first German number one song was "Ich will 'nen Cowboy als Mann".

This recording sold 1.05 million copies by mid 1965, earning Gitte a gold disc.

In 1962, she attempted to compete for Denmark in the Eurovision Song Contest with "Jeg Snakker med mig Selv", but was disqualified because the composer, Sejr Volmer-Sørensen, had whistled the song in the canteen of the Danish Broadcasting Corporation.

In 1973, she competed for Germany in the Eurovision Song Contest with the song "Junger Tag". Her success continued after famous duets with Rex Gildo as 'Gitte & Rex' in a number of popular films. Gitte made an attempt to represent Luxembourg in the Eurovision Song Contest in 1978 with the song "Rien qu'une femme" but she lost out to the group Baccara. In the 1960s she also starred in several music and drama movies and on TV in Germany, Denmark, and Sweden.

Gitte was among the most popular Schlager (hit music) singers of the post-war era, and continued to be popular in Germany and Denmark even as American music increasingly dominated the airwaves in the 1970s. She recorded a jazz album with The Kenny Clarke-Francy Boland Big Band in 1968.

Through ensuing decades her singles still reached the German charts, but never with the same success she enjoyed in the 1960s. In the 1980s, she changed her image and performed more adult-oriented music. She won some awards as a singer/entertainer. Her chart entries ended in the mid-1980s, but she has continued to be a successful live performer to the present day. A number of compilation albums have been recently released in Germany, among them a biographical DVD.

From 2004 to 2006 she starred with two other Scandinavian entertainers, Wenche Myhre and Siw Malmkvist, in a huge stage and tour success. The live CD recording of their show entered the German charts. In 2010, she presented a new CD, which also had a German chart entry. She had her first chart entry in 1960 in Sweden and her last in 2010 in Germany.

== Selected filmography ==
- The World Revolves Around You (1964)
- In Bed by Eight (1965), as Prinzessin Margaret
- The Pipes (1966), as Mary Randy
- Hagbard and Signe (1967), as Signe

Preceded by Mary Roos with Nur die Liebe läßt uns leben	Germany in the Eurovision Song Contest; 1973	Succeeded by Cindy & Bert with Die Sommermelodie
