= How to Seduce a Playboy =

1966 film

- Directed by: Michael Pfleghar
- Written by: Klaus Munro; Kurt Nachmann; Michael Pfleghar; Mario Siciliano
- Based on: Bel Ami 66 by Anatol Bratt
- Produced by: Mario Siciliano; Karl Spiehs
- Starring: Peter Alexander; Antonella Lualdi; Scilla Gabel
- Cinematography: Ernst Wild
- Edited by: Margot von Schlieffen
- Music by: Heinz Kiessling
- Production companies: Intercontinental Filmproduktion; Metheus Film
- Distributed by: Constantin Film
- Release date: 23 November 1966
- Running time: 101 minutes
- Countries: Austria; Italy
- Language: German

How to Seduce a Playboy (German: Bel Ami 2000 oder Wie verführt man einen Playboy?) is a 1966 Austrian-Italian comedy film directed by Michael Pfleghar and starring Peter Alexander, Antonella Lualdi and Scilla Gabel.

The film's sets were designed by the art director Hertha Hareiter. Location shooting took place in Paris, Rome and Tokyo.

== Synopsis ==
Every year the men's magazine selects a Playboy of the Year, but due to a computer error a shy accountant is chosen by mistake. As he has already been announced as the winner, the magazine decides to build up his public persona to justify their choice. While embarking on a tour of major international cities, he is pursued by a female journalist convinced that he is a fraud who should be exposed.

== Cast ==
- Peter Alexander as Peter Knolle
- Antonella Lualdi as Vera
- Scilla Gabel as Anita Bionda
- Helga Anders as Lucy
- Linda Christian as Lucy's Mother
- Jocelyn Lane as Ginette
- Eliane D'Almeida as Coco
- Christiane Rücker as Millie
- Joachim Teege as Emile
- Georg Corten as Director Zwerch
- Otto Ambros as Schladitz
- Renato Salvatori as Boy Schock
- Joachim Fuchsberger as Sokker

== Bibliography ==
- Von Dassanowsky, Robert. Austrian Cinema: A History. McFarland, 2005.
