= Season in Salzburg (1961 film) =

1961 film

- Directed by: Franz Josef Gottlieb
- Written by: Ernst Marischka
- Based on: Saison in Salzburg by Kurt Feltz and Max Wallner
- Produced by: Herbert Gruber
- Starring: Peter Alexander; Waltraut Haas
- Cinematography: Elio Carniel
- Edited by: Herma Sandtner
- Music by: Fred Raymond
- Production company: Sascha Film
- Distributed by: Gloria Film (West Germany); Sascha Film (Austria)
- Release date: 27 October 1961 (West Germany)
- Running time: 104 min.
- Country: Austria
- Language: German

Season in Salzburg (German: Saison in Salzburg) is a 1961 Austrian musical comedy film directed by Franz Josef Gottlieb and starring Peter Alexander, Waltraut Haas, and Gunther Philipp. It is based on the operetta Saison in Salzburg by Fred Raymond, Kurt Feltz, and Max Wallner.

== Cast ==
- Peter Alexander as Heinz Doll
- Waltraut Haas as Theres Stolzinger
- Gunther Philipp as Toni Mack
- Ingeborg Schöner as Annemarie Stolzinger
- Gunnar Möller as Dr. Erich Elz
- Loni Heuser as Heid Pritwitz
- Richard Romanowsky as Professor Spindler
- Oskar Sima as Gendarmerie-Inspektor
- Beppo Brem as Xaver Möslacher
- Else Rambausek as Lina Möslacher
