= The Last Ride to Santa Cruz =

1964 West German-Austrian film

- Film poster
- Directed by: Rolf Olsen
- Written by: Herbert Reinecker
- Produced by: Heinz Pollak; Karl Spiehs
- Starring: Edmund Purdom; Mario Adorf; Marianne Koch
- Cinematography: Karl Löb
- Edited by: Karl Aulitzky
- Music by: Erwin Halletz
- Production company: Magnet Film
- Distributed by: Constantin Film
- Release date: 28 March 1964
- Running time: 95 minutes
- Country: West Germany
- Language: German

The Last Ride to Santa Cruz (German: Der Letzte Ritt nach Santa Cruz) is a 1964 West German-Austrian Western film directed by Rolf Olsen and starring Edmund Purdom, Mario Adorf, and Marianne Koch. The film was shot at the Spandau Studios, and on location in the Canary Islands. The sets were designed by the art directors Hertha Hareiter, Leo Metzenbauer and Otto Pischinger

== Cast ==
- Edmund Purdom as Rex Kelly
- Mario Adorf as Pedro Ortiz
- Marianne Koch as Elizabeth Kelly
- Klaus Kinski as José
- Marisa Mell as Juanita
- Walter Giller as Woody Johnson
- Thomas Fritsch as Carlos
- Sieghardt Rupp as Fernando
- Florian Kuehne as Steve Kelly
- Kurt Nachmann
- Martin Urtel
- Rainer Brandt as Voice of Pedro Ortiz (voice) (uncredited)
- Edmund Hashim (uncredited)
- Rolf Olsen as John (bank employee) (uncredited)

== Bibliography ==
- Pitts, Michael R. (2012). Western Movies: A Guide to 5,105 Feature Films. Jefferson, NC: McFarland. ISBN 978-0-7864-6372-5.
