= The Great Skate =

1964 film

- Directed by: Franz Antel
- Written by: Kurt Nachmann
- Produced by: Carl Szokoll
- Starring: Marika Kilius; Hans-Jürgen Bäumler; Paul Hörbiger; Mady Rahl
- Cinematography: Siegfried Hold
- Edited by: Arnfried Heyne
- Music by: Erwin Halletz
- Production companies: Team-Film; Wiener Stadthalle-Station Betriebs-und Produktionsgesellschaft
- Distributed by: Nora Film
- Release date: 4 October 1964
- Running time: 99 minutes
- Countries: Austria; West Germany
- Language: German

The Great Skate or Free Skating (German: Die große Kür) is a 1964 Austrian-West German musical romantic comedy film directed by Franz Antel and starring Marika Kilius, Hans-Jürgen Bäumler, Paul Hörbiger and Mady Rahl. It was filmed at the Wiener Stadthalle studios in Vienna and on location in Montreux and Saint-Tropez. The film's sets were designed by the art director Horst Hennicke. It was produced in the wake of the 1964 Winter Olympics and 1964 World Figure Skating Championships in which the two leads Kilius and Bäumler had won medals. It was followed by a 1967 sequel The Great Happiness.

== Cast ==
- Marika Kilius as Self - Marika Kilius
- Hans-Jürgen Bäumler as Self - Hans-Jürgen Bäumler
- Peter Kraus as Jonny King
- Paul Hörbiger as Franz Haslinger
- Mady Rahl as Doris
- Marlene Warrlich as Helga Lindenberg - Journalistin
- Peter Fröhlich as Peter - Fotoreporter
- Marte Harell as Mrs. King - Chefin der amerikanischen Eisrevue
- Dorothee Parker as Jane
- Marlene Rahn as Kiki
- Wolf Albach-Retty as Chef der Wiener Eisrevue
- Heinz Erhardt as Eberhard Traugott - Manager
- Gunther Philipp as Tommy Toifel - Manager
- Wiener Eisrevue as Themselves
- Wiener Staatsopernballett as Themselves
- Pedro di Cordoba as Flamencotänzer
- I Brutos as Artistengruppe
- Die Liverpool-Boys as Band

== Bibliography ==
- Bock, Hans-Michael & Bergfelder, Tim. The Concise Cinegraph: Encyclopaedia of German Cinema. Berghahn Books, 2009.
- Von Dassanowsky, Robert. Austrian Cinema: A History. McFarland, 2005.
