= DM-Killer =

1965 film

- Directed by: Rolf Thiele
- Written by: Rolf Thiele; Carl Merz; Herbert Reinecker
- Based on: Ehrlich fährt am längsten by Peter Norden
- Produced by: Karl Spiehs
- Starring: Curd Jürgens; Daliah Lavi; Walter Giller
- Cinematography: Wolf Wirth
- Edited by: Gretl Girinec
- Music by: Erwin Halletz
- Production companies: Team-Film; Wiener Stadthalle-Station Betriebs-und Produktionsgesellschaft
- Distributed by: Nora Film
- Release date: 21 January 1965
- Running time: 104 minutes
- Country: Austria
- Language: German

DM-Killer is a 1965 Austrian comedy crime film directed by Rolf Thiele and starring Curd Jürgens, Daliah Lavi and Walter Giller. It was shot at the Sievering Studios in Vienna and on location in Hamburg and West Berlin. The film's sets were designed by the art directors Hertha Hareiter and Wolf Witzemann.

== Cast ==
- Curd Jürgens as Kurt Lehnert
- Daliah Lavi as Lolita, Charly's Step-sister
- Walter Giller as Charly Bauer
- Charles Regnier as Ronald Bruck
- Elga Andersen as Inge Moebius
- Erica Beer as Gerda Bruck, Ronald's Wife
- Ivan Desny as The American
- Hubert von Meyerinck as Chief Prosecutor
- Tilo von Berlepsch as Consul Moebius, Inge's Father
- Balduin Baas as Parson Behrendt
- Gisela Hahn as Püppi
- Heinrich Trimbur as Schulz
- Fritz Eckhardt as Mr. Colloway
- Erik von Loewis as Mr. von Bredow
- Stanislav Ledinek as Otto Krüger
- Elisabeth Flickenschildt as Charly's Mother
- Christiane Schmidtmer as Miranda, Pension Immertreu's Girl
- Emmerich Schrenk as Police Officer Böll

== Bibliography ==
- Goble, Alan. The Complete Index to Literary Sources in Film. Walter de Gruyter, 1999.
- Rentschler, Eric . German Film & Literature. Routledge, 2013.
