= Udo Jürgens =

Austrian singer and composer (1934–2014)

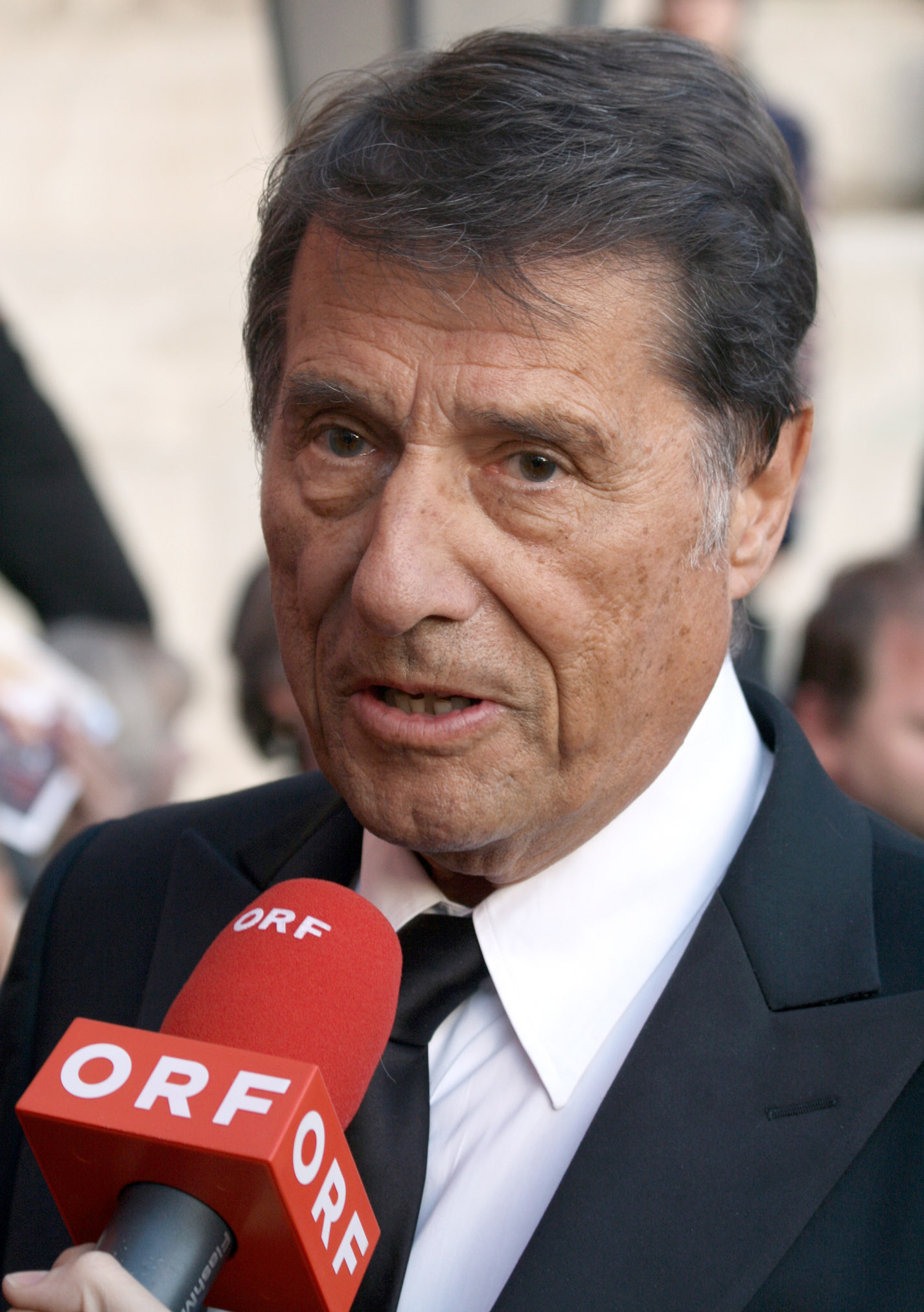
- Udo Jürgens in 2012

Background information
- Born: Jürgen Udo Bockelmann; 30 September 1934; Klagenfurt, Austria
- Died: 21 December 2014 (aged 80) Münsterlingen, Switzerland
- Genres: Pop, schlager, chanson, soft rock
- Occupations: Singer, musician, composer
- Instruments: Vocals, piano
- Years active: 1950–2014
- Website: Official website

Udo Jürgens (born Jürgen Udo Bockelmann; 30 September 1934 – 21 December 2014) was an Austrian composer and singer of popular music whose career spanned over 50 years. He won the Eurovision Song Contest 1966 for Austria, composed close to 1,000 songs, and sold over 104 million records. In 2007, he additionally obtained Swiss citizenship.

He is credited with broadening German-language pop music beyond the traditional post-war "schlager" (hit song) in the 1950s by infusing it with a modern pop appeal and French chanson style. His compositions and arrangements attracted fans of all ages, and he continued to fill venues in Germany, Austria, and Switzerland until his death at age 80.

== Career ==
In 1952, Udo Bolan, as he was called then, formed the Udo Bolan Quartet in Klagenfurt, Austria, appearing regularly at the Café Obelisk in Klagenfurt with Englishman Johnny Richards on drums, Klaus Behmel on guitar, and Bruno Geiger on Bass. The quartet played regularly at various dance and jazz venues and also broadcast on Radio Alpenland and the British Forces Radio network produced by Mike Fior.

In 1950, he won a composer contest organized by Austria's public broadcasting channel ORF with the song "Je t'aime". He wrote the 1961 worldwide hit "Reach for the Stars", sung by Shirley Bassey.

In 1964, Jürgens represented Austria for the first time at the Eurovision Song Contest 1964 with the song "Warum nur, warum?", finishing sixth. The UK participant, Matt Monro, was impressed with the melody and covered the song (with English lyrics by his manager Don Black) as "Walk Away", which reached number four in the UK Singles Chart and number 23 in the US Billboard Hot 100 chart.

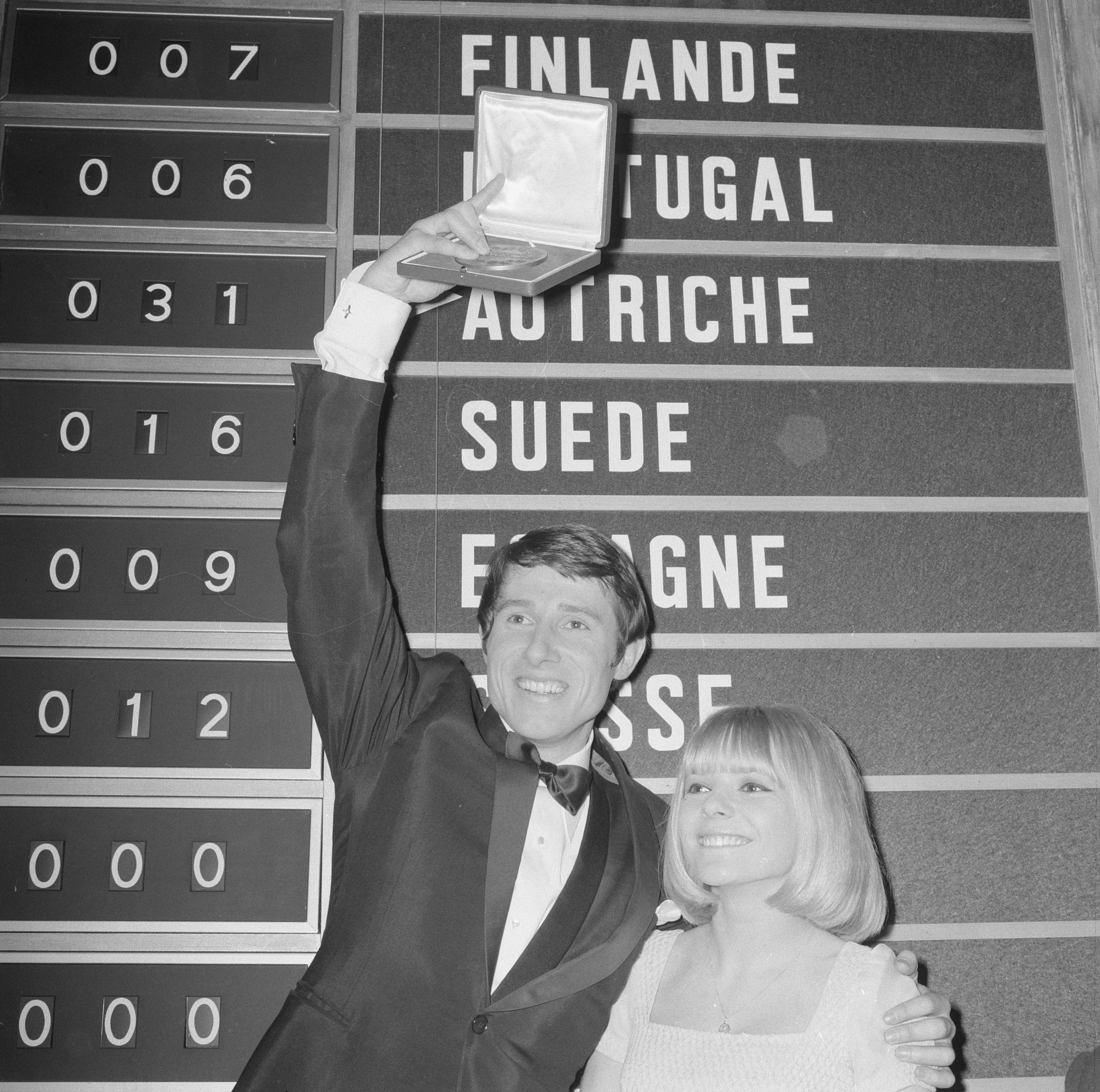
Jürgens after winning the Eurovision Song Contest 1966, with France Gall

Jürgens' song "Sag ihr, ich lass sie grüßen" came fourth in 1965's contest, and on his third try, he won the Eurovision Song Contest 1966 in Luxembourg with "Merci, Chérie", which became an English-language hit for Vince Hill, another cover by Monro, and one of Jürgens' most recognized compositions. Jürgens' version alone sold over one million copies, and he was awarded a gold disc by Deutsche Vogue in 1966.

In the following years, Jürgens wrote songs like "Griechischer Wein", "Aber bitte mit Sahne", "Mit 66 Jahren", and—one of his biggest successes—"Buenos Días, Argentina", which he performed together with the Germany national football team in 1978 in Argentina.

In 1977, he invited The Supremes to appear as guests on his televised and recorded gala concert. The Supremes (Mary Wilson, Scherrie Payne, and Susaye Greene), who were on a brief farewell tour of Europe at the time, performed two of their own hits, "You Are the Heart of Me" and "You're My Driving Wheel", as well as a duet with Jürgens' "Walk Away" in English.

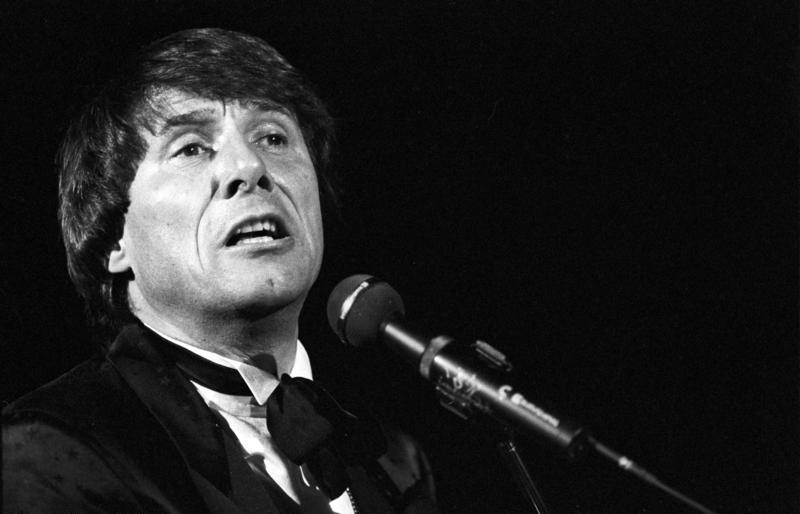
Jürgens in 1987

In 1979, he released a disco album entitled Udo '80, which spawned the hit single "Ich weiß was ich will". This song was also released as a 12" disco single in an extended remix for nightclubs.

On 2 December 2007, the jukebox musical Ich war noch niemals in New York ("I've never been to New York") opened in Hamburg's Operettenhaus. It weaves songs by Jürgens into a familial storyline, similar to the treatment of ABBA songs in Mamma Mia!, the musical succeeded at the venue.

Udo Jürgens is very famous in Argentina, where he has one of the biggest fan bases outside of German speaking countries. Since 2015, Jürgens holds the worldwide-record as the artist with the longest presence in the charts ever—more than 57 years from his first entry 1958 till 2015. On 16 December 2022, a new album consisting of his legacies was released by his children. This reached #1 on the German charts on 24 December. Thus, Jürgens has been in the German charts for more than eight decades.

== Cover versions ==
"Merci, Chérie", whose original German lyrics were written by Thomas Hörbiger, has been translated or adapted into several languages and covered by dozens of artists in both vocal and instrumental recordings. These versions include:

- "Merci Chérie" by Claude Carrère and André Salvet (French)
- "Merci" by Vito Pallavicini (Italian)
- "Merci Cherie" by Baker Cavendish (English)
- "Merci Cherie" by Fred Bekky (Dutch)
- "Merci Chérie" by Al Sandström (Swedish)
- "Merci Chérie" by Gina Trandafirescu (Romanian)
- "Merci Cheri" by Andrzej Ozga (Polish)

Jürgens himself recorded many of the translations for international release, including a version in Japanese. More recent covers include Belinda Carlisle's 2007 recording of the French version.

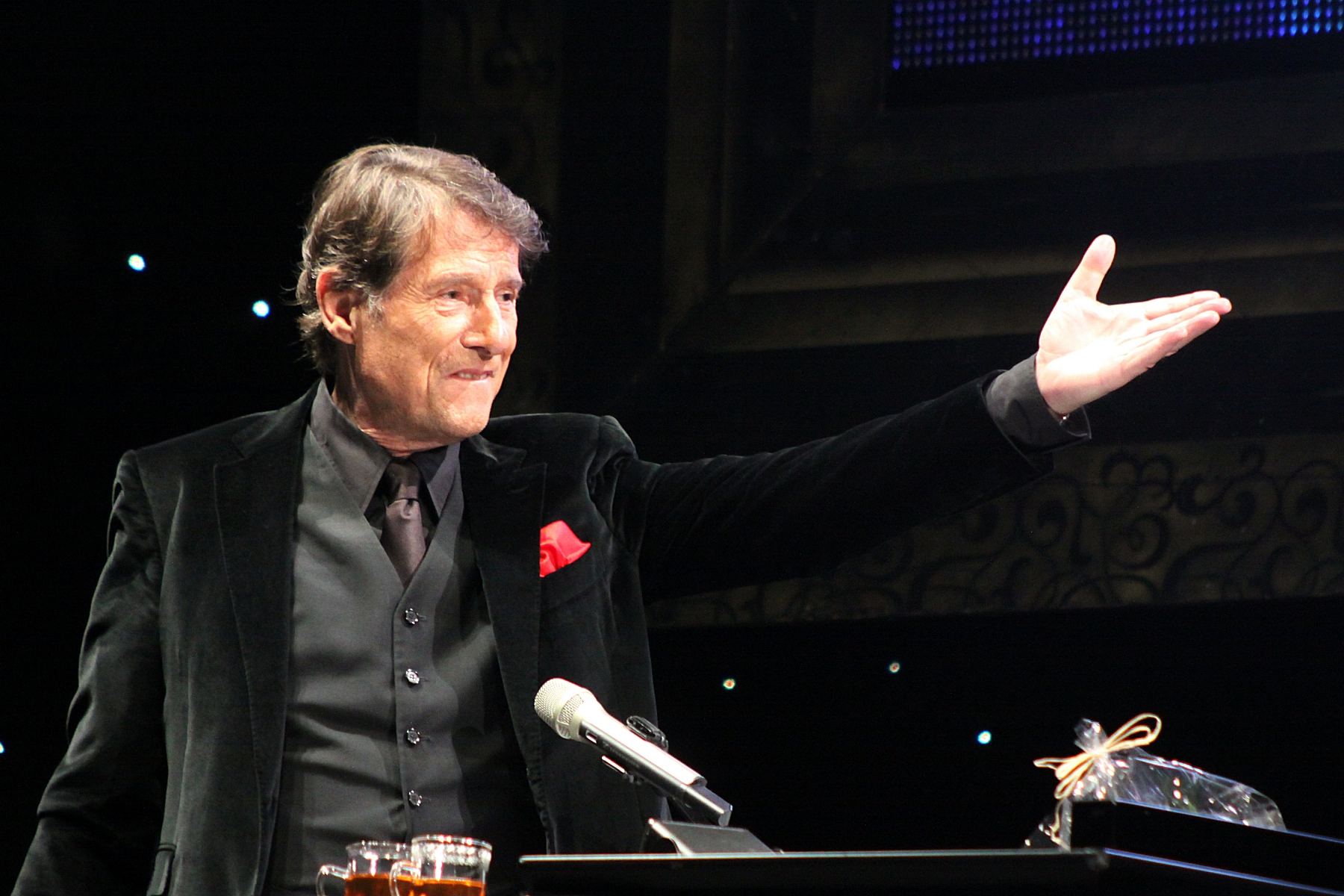
Jürgens in 2010

In addition to recording Cavendish's "Merci, Chérie" lyric, Matt Monro covered five more Jürgens compositions, all with English lyrics (unrelated to the German ones), written by his manager Don Black. Four of these became closely associated with Monro (and were subsequently covered by Jürgens himself):

- "Warum nur warum?" became "Walk Away" (a 1964 Top 40 hit in both the U.S. and UK)
- "Du sollst die Welt für mich sein" became "Without You" (a 1965 UK Top 40 hit)
- "Was ich dir sagen will" became "The Music Played" (1968)
- "Illusionen" became "If I Never Sing Another Song" (1977), which was later performed by Frankie Laine, Shirley Bassey, Sammy Davis Jr., and other entertainers.

A fifth Jürgens song, "In dieser Welt", became "Lovin' You Again", and in 1969, Matt Monro recorded both Spanish and English versions, the latter not released until August 2012. (Monro also recorded Spanish versions of "Walk Away" and "The Music Played"; all three Spanish lyrics were adapted for Monro from Don Black's versions by Leonardo Schultz, who also produced the Spanish recordings.)

In one of his last recording sessions, Bing Crosby covered an English version of Jürgens' "Griechischer Wein" called "Come Share the Wine", which also was written by Black. The song was released after Crosby's death in 1977 as the title track of a compilation album and was later recorded by Al Martino.

In 1979, Marty Robbins released an English version of "Buenos Dias Argentina" that became a latter-day standard for Robbins.

In the early 1990s, German thrash metal band Sodom released a 'metalized' cover of the boogie "Aber bitte mit Sahne".

In 2009, the German band Sportfreunde Stiller covered "Ich war noch niemals in New York" together with Jürgens on their MTV Unplugged concert in Munich.

== Death ==
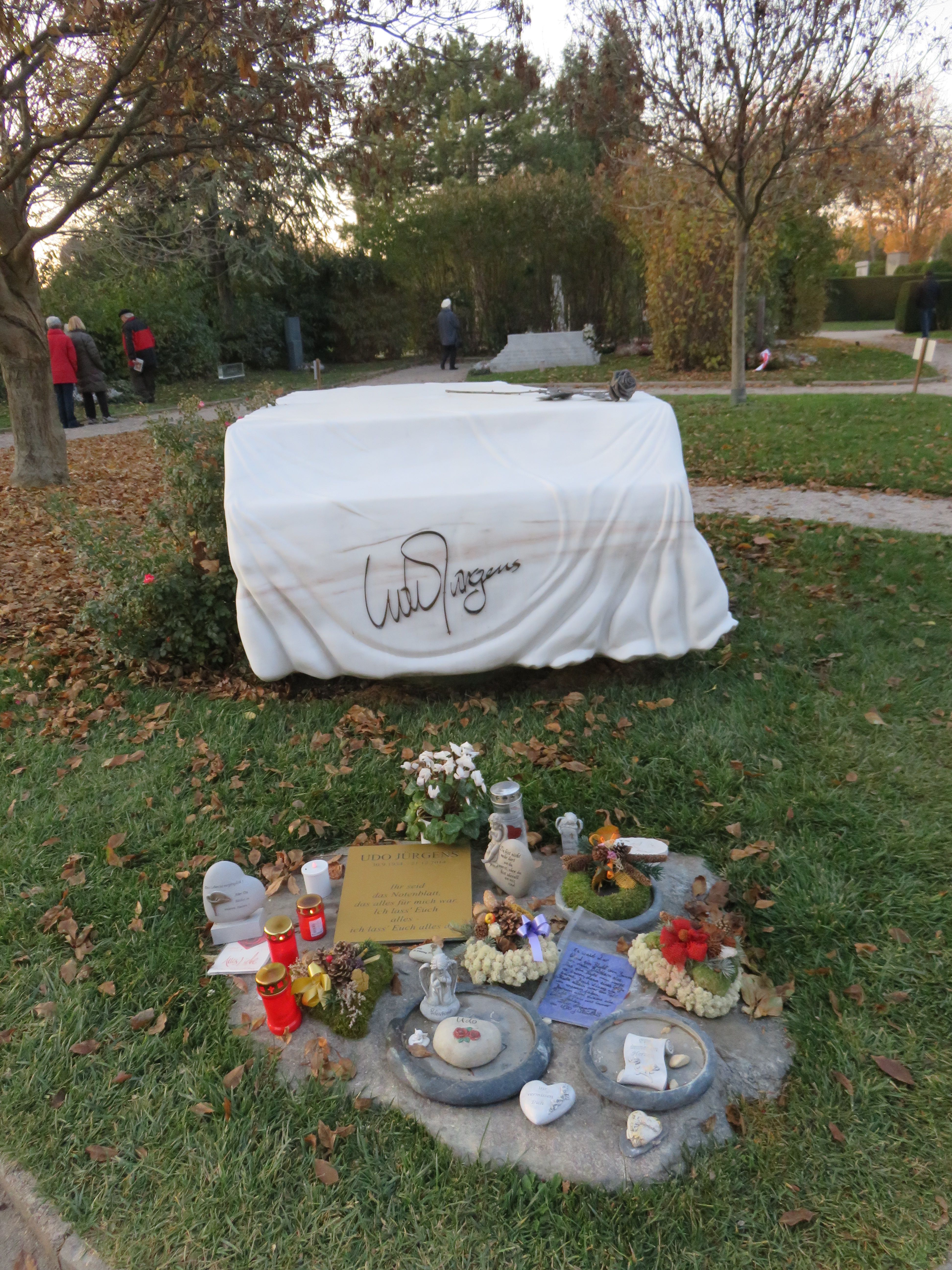
Jürgens' grave at the Vienna Central Cemetery

On 21 December 2014, Udo Jürgens collapsed unconscious during a walk in the municipality of Gottlieben (Canton of Thurgau), where he had rented a house. Despite resuscitation attempts, he died at the Cantonal Hospital in Münsterlingen at the age of 80 due to heart failure. Two weeks earlier, he had completed the first part of his 25th concert tour in Zurich which covered 27 cities. The tour began on 24 October 2014 in Heilbronn and ended in Zurich Hallenstadion on 7 December 2014. His final public performance took place on 12 December 2014, at the Velodrom in Berlin during the Helene Fischer Show. The performance was broadcast on ZDF on 25 December 2014.

On 15 January 2015, around 200 friends, family and companions gathered in Zurich for a memorial service to bid farewell to Udo Jürgens. His urn was placed in the Volkshalle of the Vienna City Hall, allowing the public to pay their final respects. High-ranking officials, including the then Austrian President Heinz Fischer and Chancellor Werner Faymann, signed the condolence books. Jürgens was laid to rest in an honorary grave of the City of Vienna at the Vienna Central Cemetery.

The gravestone, depicting a grand piano draped in a white mourning cloth, was designed by his brother Manfred Bockelmann and sculpted in Laas marble by artist Hans Muhr. The memorial plaque features one of his lyrics—after multiple corrections of an initially misspelled inscription—reading: "Ihr seid das Notenblatt, das alles für mich war. Ich lass’ Euch alles – ich lass’ Euch alles da!" ("You are the sheet music that meant everything to me. I leave you everything – I leave you everything behind!").

Between 23 January and 30 January 2025, a selection of Udo Jürgens' possessions was auctioned by Sotheby’s. The proceeds will go to the Udo Jürgens Foundation, which supports children without parental care and provides assistance to young musical talents.

One of the highlights of the auction was a Schimmel transparent concert grand piano from Jürgens' estate, which sold for €240,000—far exceeding its estimated value which had originally been valued at €20,000 to €30,000.

The auction, which included many other memorabilia from Jürgens’ life, saw overwhelming demand, with nearly 400 bidders placing a total of 3,150 bids. In the end, the total auction proceeds amounted to approximately €1.7 million—far surpassing the initial estimate of €370,000 to €500,000 for the entire collection.

== Family ==
- His brother, Manfred Bockelmann (born 1 July 1943), is a painter.
- His son by his first marriage, John Jürgens (born 20 February 1964), is a singer, actor and DJ.
- His daughter by his first marriage, Jenny Jürgens (born 22 January 1967), is an actress.
- His uncle, Werner Bockelmann (23 September 1907 – 7 April 1968), was mayor of Frankfurt am Main.

As Jürgens was not the real family name of Udo Jürgens, he was not related to real Jürgens' like the singer Andrea Jürgens (1967 – 2017) or the actor Curd Jürgens (1915 – 1982).

== Discography ==
- "Portrait in Musik" (1965)
- "Merci, Chérie" (1966, Eurovision Song Contest)
- "Chansons" (1967)
- "Portrait in Musik – 2. Folge" (1967)
- "Was ich dir sagen will" (1967)
- "Mein Lied für dich" (1968)
- "Udo" (1968)
- "Wünsche zur Weihnachtszeit" (1968)
- "Udo Live" (1969)
- "Portrait International" (1969)
- "Udo '70" (1969)
- "Udo '71" (1970)
- "Zeig mir den Platz an der Sonne" (1971)
- "Helden, Helden" (musical) (1972)
- "Ich bin wieder da" (1972)
- "Udo in Concert – Europatournee '72/'73" (1973)
- "International 2" (1973)
- "Live in Japan" (1973)
- "Udo heute" (1974)
- "Meine Lieder" (1974)
- "Udo '75" (1975)
- "Meine Lieder 2" (1976)
- "Udo Live '77" (1977)
- "Meine Lieder '77" (1977)
- "Lieder, die auf Reisen gehen" (1978)
- "Buenos Días Argentina" (football world championship) (1978)
- "Ein Mann und seine Lieder – Live" (1978)
- "Nur ein Lächeln" (1979)
- "Udo '80" (1979)
- "Meine Lieder sind wie Hände – Live" (1980)
- "Leave a Little Love" (1981)
- "Willkommen in meinem Leben" (1981)
- "Silberstreifen" (1982)
- "Udo Live – Lust am Leben" (1982)
- "Traumtänzer" (1983)
- "Hautnah" (1984)
- "Udo live und hautnah" (1985)
- "Treibjagd" (1985)
- "Deinetwegen" (1986)
- "Udo Live '87" (1987)
- "Das blaue Album" (1988)
- "Sogar Engel brauchen Glück" (best-of compilation including five remakes) (1989)
- "Ohne Maske" (1989)
- "Live ohne Maske" (1990)
- "Sempre Roma" (football world championship) (1990)
- "Das Traumschiff" (instrumental soundtrack) (1990)
- "Geradeaus" (1991)
- "Open Air Symphony" (1992)
- "Café Größenwahn" (1993)
- "Aber bitte mit Sahne" (hits compilation including a new song and two remakes) (1994)
- "140 Tage Café Größenwahn Tour 94/95" (1995)
- "Zärtlicher Chaot" (1995)
- "Gestern-Heute-Morgen" (1996)
- "Gestern-Heute-Morgen – Live '97" (1997)
- "Aber bitte mit Sahne 2" (hits compilation including eight remakes) (1998)
- "Ich werde da sein" (1999)
- "Mit 66 Jahren (Was wichtig ist)" (2000)
- "Mit 66 Jahren – Live 2001" (2001)
- "Es lebe das Laster" (2002)
- "Es werde Licht" (2003)
- "Es Lebe das Laster – Udo Live" (2004)
- "Jetzt oder nie" (2005)
- "Der Solo-Abend – Live am Gendarmenmarkt" (2005)
- "Jetzt oder nie – Live 2006" (2006)
- "Einfach ich" (2008)
- "Einfach ich – Live 2009" (2009)
- "Best Of" (including a remake live by MTV Unplugged) (2009)
- "Der ganz normale Wahnsinn" (2011)
- "Der Mann mit dem Fagott" (soundtrack to his own film) (2011)
- "Der ganz normale Wahnsinn – Live" (2012)
- "Mitten im Leben" (2014)
- "Udo Jürgens Live – Das letzte Konzert Zürich 2014 mit dem Orchester Pepe Lienhard" (new live album recorded at his last concert of his last tour, 7 December 2014, only two weeks before he died) (2015)
- "Merci, Udo!" (2016)
- "Merci, Udo! 2" (2017)
- "Da Capo - 3 CD Box" (2022)
- "Die schönsten Lieder zur Weihnachtszeit" (2023)

== Selected filmography ==
- Lilli (1958), as Matrose Benno
- Our Crazy Aunts (1961), as Pitt van Rees
- Drei Liebesbriefe aus Tirol (1962), as Martin Hinterkirchner
- Dance with Me Into the Morning (1962), as Max Kainz
- Our Crazy Nieces (1963), as Pitt van Rees
- Our Crazy Aunts in the South Seas (1964), as Pitt van Rees
- Das Spukschloß im Salzkammergut (1966), as Udo

As himself

- The Legs of Dolores (1957)
- … und du mein Schatz bleibst hier (1961)
- Hochzeit am Neusiedler See (1963)
- The Battle of the Mods (1966)

Soundtrack

- Potato Fritz (1976)

Film adaptations

- The Man with the Bassoon (2011) – Based on Udo Jürgens' autobiography
- Ich war noch niemals in New York (2019) – Musical, based on songs by Udo Jürgens

== See also ==
- List of Austrians in music

Awards and achievements
Preceded by (Luxembourg) France Gall with "Poupée de cire, poupée de son"	Winner of the Eurovision Song Contest; 1966	Succeeded by (United Kingdom) Sandie Shaw with "Puppet on a String"
Preceded by Carmela Corren with "Vielleicht geschieht ein Wunder"	Austria in the Eurovision Song Contest; 1964–1966 "Warum nur warum?"(1964) and "Sag ihr, ich lass sie grüßen"(1965) with "Merci, Chérie"(1966)	Succeeded by Peter Horton with "Warum es hunderttausend Sterne gibt"
