= Our Crazy Aunts in the South Seas =

1964 film directed by Rolf Olsen

- Directed by: Rolf Olsen
- Written by: Rolf Olsen
- Produced by: Karl Spiehs
- Starring: Gunther Philipp; Gus Backus; Udo Jürgens
- Cinematography: Karl Löb
- Edited by: Karl Aulitzky
- Music by: Erwin Halletz
- Production company: Wiener Stadthalle-Station Betriebs-und Produktions
- Distributed by: Constantin Film
- Release date: 14 February 1964
- Running time: 88 minutes
- Country: Austria
- Language: German

Our Crazy Aunts in the South Seas (German: Unsere tollen Tanten in der Südsee) is a 1964 Austrian comedy film directed by Rolf Olsen and starring Gunther Philipp, Gus Backus, and Udo Jürgens. It was the final part in a trilogy of films that also included Our Crazy Aunts and Our Crazy Nieces. Barbara Frey was cast in the role that had been played by Vivi Bach in the two previous films.

The film's sets were designed by the art director Leo Metzenbauer. Location shooting took place in the Canary Islands.

== Cast ==
- Gunther Philipp as Max Rettich
- Gus Backus as Gus Sunday
- Udo Jürgens as Pit van Rees
- Kurt Großkurth as Hyacinth
- Wolfgang Jansen as Paul
- Barbara Frey as Susi Güden
- Ruth Stephan as Felicitas
- Trude Herr as Aglaja Schultz
- Guggi Löwinger as Evi
- Elfie Fiegert as Lailani
- Ady Berber as Medizinmann Wudu-Budu
- Rolf Olsen as Gangsterboss and Camel
- Al Fats Edwards as Häuptling der Meri-Meris
- Ilse Peternell as Miss Parker
- Chris Howland as Slim Fergusson

== Bibliography ==
- Von Dassanowsky, Robert (2005). Austrian Cinema: A History. Jefferson, NC: McFarland. ISBN 978-1-4766-2147-0.
