= Kurt Nachmann =

Austrian screenwriter, film actor and director

- Born: 13 May 1915; Vienna, Austro-Hungarian Empire
- Died: 4 March 1984 (aged 68); Vienna, Austria
- Occupations: Writer, Actor, Director
- Years active: 1946–1985 (film & TV)

Kurt Nachmann (1915–1984) was an Austrian screenwriter and film actor and director.

== Selected filmography ==
- The Singing House (1948)
- Espionage (1955)
- The Congress Dances (1955)
- Marriage Sanitarium (1955)
- Kaiserjäger (1956)
- If We All Were Angels (1956)
- The Unexcused Hour (1957)
- Vienna, City of My Dreams (1957)
- War of the Maidens (1957)
- Arena of Fear (1959)
- Twelve Girls and One Man (1959)
- Jack and Jenny (1963)
- Don't Fool with Me (1963)
- Is Geraldine an Angel? (1963)
- With Best Regards (1963)
- I Learned It from Father (1964)
- The Great Skate (1964)
- The Last Ride to Santa Cruz (1964)
- Full Hearts and Empty Pockets (1964)
- Who Wants to Sleep? (1965)
- A Holiday with Piroschka (1965)
- Call of the Forest (1965)
- Manhattan Night of Murder (1965)
- Count Bobby, The Terror of The Wild West (1966)
- The Trap Snaps Shut at Midnight (1966)
- How to Seduce a Playboy (1966)
- The Great Happiness (1967)
- Charley's Uncle (1969)
- Our Doctor is the Best (1969)
- House of Pleasure (1969)
- When You're With Me (1970)
- When the Mad Aunts Arrive (1970)
- Holidays in Tyrol (1971)
- Who Laughs Last, Laughs Best (1971)
- Always Trouble with the Reverend (1972)
- Don't Get Angry (1972)
- Trouble with Trixie (1972)
- Cry of the Black Wolves (1972)
- My Daughter, Your Daughter (1972)
- The Twins from Immenhof (1973)
- The Bloody Vultures of Alaska (1973)
- Blue Blooms the Gentian (1973)
- Spring in Immenhof (1974)
- Zwei himmlische Dickschädel (1974)
- Vanessa (1977)
- Der Bockerer (1981)

== Bibliography ==
- Fritsche, Maria. Homemade Men In Postwar Austrian Cinema: Nationhood, Genre and Masculinity . Berghahn Books, 2013.
