= With Best Regards =

1963 film

- Directed by: Kurt Nachmann
- Written by: Kurt Nachmann
- Based on: With Best Regards by Hans Schubert
- Produced by: Karl Spiehs
- Starring: Georg Thomalla; Adrian Hoven; Paul Dahlke
- Cinematography: Hanns Matula
- Music by: Johannes Fehring
- Production company: Wiener Stadthalle-Station Betriebs-und Produktionsgesellschaft
- Distributed by: Union-Film
- Release date: 22 May 1963
- Running time: 80 minutes
- Country: Austria
- Language: German

With Best Regards (German: Mit besten Empfehlungen) is a 1963 Austrian comedy film directed by Kurt Nachmann and starring Georg Thomalla, Adrian Hoven and Paul Dahlke. It was based on a play of the same title by Hans Schubert. The film's sets were designed by the art director Ferry Windberger.

== Cast ==
- Georg Thomalla as Ferdinand Blume, Lohnbuchhalter
- Adrian Hoven as Hans Neubauer, Lohnbuchhalter
- Paul Dahlke as Generaldirektor Brock
- Trude Herr as Juliane Kahr, seine Schwester
- Jan Hendriks as Muppilein, ihr Verlobter
- Alex Doualla as Lukula Thelonius, ein Neger
- Wera Frydtberg as Hilde Hartmann, Sekretärin
- Karin Heske as Eva, Tochter Brocks
- Gunther Philipp as Otto Alhoys
- Mady Rahl as Trude Immervoll, Direktionssekretärin
- Otto Schmöle as Fohnsheim, Bankpräsident
- Oskar Sima as Der Minister

== Bibliography ==
- Goble, Alan. The Complete Index to Literary Sources in Film. Walter de Gruyter, 1999.
- Von Dassanowsky, Robert. Austrian Cinema: A History. McFarland, 2005.
