= Is Geraldine an Angel? =

1963 film

- Directed by: Steve Previn
- Written by: Carl Merz; Kurt Nachmann; Peter Loos; Steve Previn
- Based on: Play by Hans Jaray and Kurt Nachmann
- Produced by: Adolf Eder; Heinz Pollak; Karl Spiehs
- Starring: Cornelia Froboess; Peter Weck; Vilma Degischer
- Cinematography: Georg Bruckbauer
- Edited by: Alfred Srp
- Music by: Heinz Gietz
- Production company: Wiener Stadthalle
- Distributed by: Nora-Filmverleih
- Release date: 30 August 1963
- Running time: 84 minutes
- Country: Austria
- Language: German

Is Geraldine an Angel? (German: Ist Geraldine ein Engel?) is a 1963 Austrian comedy film directed by Steve Previn and starring Cornelia Froboess, Peter Weck and Vilma Degischer. The film's sets were designed by the art director Hertha Hareiter.

== Cast ==
- Cornelia Froboess as Geraldine
- Peter Weck as Niki
- Vilma Degischer as Tante Klara
- Gunther Philipp as Onkel Viktor
- Sabine Bethmann as Elisabeth
- Ivan Desny as Jan
- Christiane Nielsen as Lilo
- Eva Fichte
- Heidi Grübl
- Elisabeth Stiepl
- Erna Schickl
- Ilse Hennig
- Maxi Böhm
- Herbert Fux
- Otto Hoch-Fischer
- Curt Eilers
- Franz Tiefenbacher
- Gustaf Elger
- Waltraut Haas as Cameo as Stewardess

== Bibliography ==
- Von Dassanowsky, Robert. Austrian Cinema: A History. McFarland, 2005.
