= Steve Previn =

Stephen Wolf Previn (born Wolf Stefan Priwin; 21 October 1920 in Berlin, Germany; died 9 July 1993 in Palm Desert, California) was a German-born American director of television episodes and feature films and film production executive. Previn began his film career in 1943 as an editor for MGM and later Universal Studios. In 1950, he moved to Europe. Previn directed numerous television series, and a decade later, directed several features for Walt Disney in Europe.

In 1965 he went to work for Eon Productions in London as a television executive and in 1966 joined Paramount London as a film executive. In 1970 he segued to Commonwealth United Entertainment, Inc., as a production executive and also freelanced in Europe on several films.

While living in London, Previn, in the 1970s, served as the English Representative and Production Executive for American International Pictures.

He was the brother of musician André Previn and second cousin once-removed of American-born film composer Charles Previn.

== Filmography ==
As production executive

- Venus in Furs (1969)
- Justine de Sade
- Hennessy (American International Pictures) (1975)
- A Matter of Time (American International Pictures) (1976)
- The People That Time Forgot (American International Pictures) (1977)

As producer

- Battle of Neretva, August 19, 1970 †

As director

- Almost Angels (Disney) (26 September 1962)
- The Waltz King (Disney) (1963)
- Escapade in Florence (Disney) (1962)
- Is Geraldine an Angel? (1963)

As editor

- Gunman in the Streets (1950)

† 1969 Academy Award nominee for Best Foreign Film

== Television ==
- Captain Video and His Video Rangers

a.k.a. Captain Video - USA (alternative title)

1. In the Clutches of the Klaw (18 February 1952) – director
2. Shipwrecked (3 March 1952) – director
3. Birth of the 'Galaxy' (24 March 1952) – director
4. Operation Micromail (21 April 1952) – director
5. Operation Venus (16 May 1952) – director
6. Space Race (7 July 1952) – director
7. The Threat of the Rogue World (25 July 1952) – director
8. The Green King (22 September 1952) – director
- Foreign Intrigue

a.k.a. Cross Current - USA (rerun title)
a.k.a. Dateline: Europe - USA (rerun title)
a.k.a. Overseas Adventures - USA (rerun title)

1. The Third Partner (1 January 1954) – director
2. The Brotherhood (1 January 1954) – director
3. Sabotage (1 January 1954) – director
4. Witness at Large (1 January 1954) – director
5. The Mills of God (8 April 1954) – director
6. Waterfront Story (22 October 1954) – director
7. The Trumpet Player (4 November 1954) – director
8. International Robbery (11 November 1954) – director
9. The Stamp Collector (18 November 1954) – director
10. The Jewel Thief (25 November 1954) - Director
11. The Poisoned Teacup (2 December 1954) – director
12. The Playful Prince (9 December 1954) – director
13. Kurt Hallen Story (1 January 1955) – director
14. Night Fighter (1 January 1955) – director
15. Two Men from Zurich (12 March 1955) – director
16. The Broken Wishbone (19 March 1955) – director
17. The Concert Pianist (26 March 1955) – director
18. The Secret Plane (2 April 1955) – director
19. Revenge (16 April 1955) – director
20. Full Circle (16 April 1955) – director
21. The Diplomat (23 April 1955) – director
22. Little Romeo (30 April 1955) – director
23. Big Brother (14 May 1955) – director
24. Miss Fortune (21 May 1955) – director
25. The Reluctant Killer (28 May 1955) – director
26. The Beauty (4 June 1955) – director
27. First Blush (11 June 1955) – director
28. Run Around (18 June 1955) – director
29. Delores (25 June 1955) – director
- Sherlock Holmes
1. The Case of the Texas Cowgirl on YouTube (8 November 1954) – director
2. The Case of the Shoeless Engineer (3 January 1955) – director
3. The Case of the Split Ticket (10 January 1955) – director
4. The Case of the French Interpreter (17 January 1955) – director
5. The Case of the Singing Violin (24 January 1955) – director
6. The Case of the Greystone Inscription (31 January 1955) – director
7. The Case of the Thistle Killer (14 February 1955) – director
8. The Case of the Vanished Detective (21 February 1955) – director
9. The Case of the Careless Suffragette (28 February 1955) – director
10. The Case of the Reluctant Carpenter (7 March 1955) – director
11. The Case of the Christmas Pudding (4 April 1955) – director
12. The Night Train Riddle (11 April 1955) – director
13. The Case of the Violent Suitor (18 April 1955) – director
14. The Case of the Perfect Husband (2 May 1955) – director
15. The Case of the Jolly Hangman (9 May 1955) – director
16. The Case of the Imposter Mystery (16 May 1955) – director
17. The Case of the Eiffel Tower (23 May 1955) – director
18. The Case of the Exhumed Client (30 May 1955) – director
19. The Case of the Impromptu Performance (6 June 1955) – director
20. The Case of the Baker Street Bachelors (20 June 1955) – director
21. The Case of the Royal Murder (27 June 1955) – director
22. The Case of the Haunted Gainsborough (4 July 1955) – director
23. The Case of the Neurotic Detective (11 July 1955) – director
24. The Case of the Unlucky Gambler (18 July 1955) – director
25. The Case of the Tyrant's Daughter (17 October 1955) – director
- Walt Disney's Wonderful World of Color

a.k.a. Disneyland - USA (original title)
a.k.a. Disney's Wonderful World - USA (new title)
a.k.a. The Disney Sunday Movie - USA (new title)
a.k.a. The Magical World of Disney - USA (new title)
a.k.a. The Wonderful World of Disney - USA (new title)
a.k.a. Walt Disney - USA (new title)
a.k.a. Walt Disney Presents - USA (new title)

1. Escapade in Florence: Part 1 (30 September 1962) – director
2. Escapade in Florence: Part 2 (7 October 1962) – director
3. The Waltz King: Part 1 (27 October 1963) – director
4. The Waltz King: Part 2 (3 November 1963) – director
5. Almost Angels: Part 1 (28 February 1965) – director
6. Almost Angels: Part 2 (7 March 1965) – director
- Run for Your Life
1. How to Sell Your Soul for Fun and Profit (18 October 1965) – director

== Immigration to the United States ==
Steve's father, Jack Previn (Jacob Priwin; 1885–1963), had been a lawyer and notary in Germany before fleeing from the Nazis to the United States. Steve Previn (then known as Wolf Priwin) steamed aboard the SS Hamburg from Hamburg, Germany to New York from January 16, 1936, to January 24, 1936, to join a family friend in New York, Rudolph Polk (1895–1957), a concert violinist who, at the time, lived at 35 West 81st Street in Manhattan.

Steve's immediate family — Jacob, Charlotte (Steve's mother, née Epstein; 1891–1986), Leonore (Steve's sister; 1923–1959; husband – Sidney Saul Young; 1912–1987), and Andreas Priwin – steamed aboard the SS Manhattan from Le Havre, France to New York City, arriving October 27, 1938. Jacob Priwin listed his cousin, Leo Previn (1884–1954) (who lived on the Upper West Side in Manhattan), as his U.S. contact. Charlotte, Andreas, and Leonore then sailed from New York to Los Angeles from November 26, 1938, to December 11, 1938, aboard the SS City of Newport News.

In Los Angeles, Jack Previn turned a hobby as a musician into a career as a music teacher.

Steve Previn was married to Elizabeth Previn. They had a son, Nicholas Previn.
