= Oskar Sima =

Austrian actor

- Born: 31 July 1896; Hohenau an der March, Austria-Hungary
- Died: 24 June 1969 (aged 72); Langenzersdorf, Austria
- Occupation: Actor
- Years active: 1921-1967
- Spouse: Lina Woiwode (1929–1969) (his death)

Oskar Sima (31 July 1896 – 24 June 1969) was an Austrian actor who is best remembered for appearing in supporting roles in countless comedy films from the 1930s to the 1960s.

Born in Hohenau an der March, Lower Austria, Sima attended high school in Vienna. After a brief tour in the army during World War I, he began acting in various theatrical productions in Berlin, Vienna, and other cities in Central Europe. He began his film career in 1921, and appeared in a number of German silent films early on. Sima was frequently cast as the comic villain whose machinations get everyone into trouble, although often his villainous stature was used to more chilling effect.

In 1929, Sima married actress Lina Woiwode. The couple remained married until Sima's death.

Along with Friedl Czepa, Fred Hennings and Leni Riefenstahl he was identified as being an active supporter of the Nazi Party. After World War II, Sima was a frequent character actor, causing one biographer to write, "... there was hardly a movie in which Oskar Sima didn't act."

Sima suffered an aneurysm in 1968 and languished for nearly a year before succumbing to his illness on 24 June 1969. He was 72.

== Selected filmography ==
- Evelyn's Love Adventures (1921)
- Sons in Law (1926)
- Leontine's Husbands (1928)
- Column X (1929)
- The Woman One Longs For (1929)
- Phantoms of Happiness (1929)
- The Model from Montparnasse (1929)
- Scandalous Eva (1930)
- The Immortal Vagabond (1930)
- The Other (1930)
- Darling of the Gods (1930)
- Dangers of the Engagement Period (1930)
- Burglars (1930)
- End of the Rainbow (1930)
- There Is a Woman Who Never Forgets You (1930)
- The Merry Wives of Vienna (1931)
- The Unknown Guest (1931)
- I Go Out and You Stay Here (1931)
- Die Fledermaus (1931)
- Schubert's Dream of Spring (1931)
- The Paw (1931)
- The Big Attraction (1931)
- Inquest (1931)
- The Countess of Monte Cristo (1932)
- The Beautiful Adventure (1932)
- You Don't Forget Such a Girl (1932)
- Three on a Honeymoon (1932)
- Things Are Getting Better Already (1932)
- Girls to Marry (1932)
- A Mad Idea (1932)
- Secret of the Blue Room (1932)
- The Magic Top Hat (1932)
- Two Lucky Days (1932)
- Scampolo (1932)
- Love Must Be Understood (1933)
- The Star of Valencia (1933)
- A Door Opens (1933)
- Scandal in Budapest (1933)
- Today Is the Day (1933)
- Such a Rascal (1934)
- Miss Liselott (1934)
- The Voice of Love (1934)
- Decoy (1934)
- The Young Baron Neuhaus (1934)
- Roses from the South (1934)
- A Night in Venice (1934)
- Heinz in the Moon (1934)
- Love, Death and the Devil (1934)
- Suburban Cabaret (1935)
- Punks Arrives from America (1935)
- Fresh Wind from Canada (1935)
- Lessons in Love (1935)
- The Royal Waltz (1935)
- The Red Rider (1935)
- Marriage Strike (1935)
- Last Stop (1935)
- Pillars of Society (1935)
- Donogoo Tonka (1936)
- Doctor Engel (1936)
- Orders Are Orders (1936)
- Lucky Kids (1936)
- Women's Regiment (1936)
- The Missing Wife (1937)
- Land of Love (1937)
- Meiseken (1937)
- The Charm of La Boheme (1937)
- Woman's Love—Woman's Suffering (1937)
- Seven Slaps (1937)
- The Optimist (1938)
- Nanon (1938)
- Five Million Look for an Heir (1938)
- Woman in the River (1939)
- Linen from Ireland (1939)
- Vienna Tales (1940)
- Trenck the Pandur (1940)
- Above All Else in the World (1941)
- Love is Duty Free (1941)
- Lightning Around Barbara (1941)
- Heaven, We Inherit a Castle (1943)
- Two Happy People (1943)
- The White Dream (1943)
- Kohlhiesel's Daughters (1943)
- Orient Express (1944)
- The Freckle (1948)
- Night of the Twelve (1949)
- Archduke Johann's Great Love (1950)
- Third from the Right (1950)
- Wedding Night in Paradise (1950)
- The Heath Is Green (1951)
- Maya of the Seven Veils (1951)
- Night on Mont Blanc (1951)
- Fanfares of Love (1951)
- Wedding in the Hay (1951)
- Woe to Him Who Loves (1951)
- Czardas of Hearts (1951)
- The Mine Foreman (1952)
- Ideal Woman Sought (1952)
- Mikosch Comes In (1952)
- Don't Ask My Heart (1952)
- The Imaginary Invalid (1952)
- The Colourful Dream (1952)
- My Wife Is Being Stupid (1952)
- The Forester's Daughter (1952)
- The Prince of Pappenheim (1952)
- Rose of the Mountain (1952)
- Holiday From Myself (1952)
- When The Village Music Plays on Sunday Nights (1953)
- The Rose of Stamboul (1953)
- The Emperor Waltz (1953)
- Lady's Choice (1953)
- The Bachelor Trap (1953)
- Roses from the South (1954)
- The Gypsy Baron (1954)
- Oh... Rosalinda!! (1955)
- Operation Sleeping Bag (1955)
- As Long as There Are Pretty Girls (1955)
- The False Adam (1955)
- Marriage Sanitarium (1955)
- The Inn on the Lahn (1955)
- How Do I Become a Film Star? (1955)
- The Congress Dances (1955)
- The Three from the Filling Station (1955)
- My Aunt, Your Aunt (1956)
- The Stolen Trousers (1956)
- The Hunter from Roteck (1956)
- Fruit in the Neighbour's Garden (1956)
- The Girl Without Pyjamas (1957)
- The Schimeck Family (1957)
- War of the Maidens (1957)
- Hello Taxi (1958)
- Peter Shoots Down the Bird (1959)
- The Adventures of Count Bobby (1961)
- Season in Salzburg (1961)
- Die Fledermaus (1962)
- The Sweet Life of Count Bobby (1962)
- The Turkish Cucumbers (1962)
- The Bird Seller (1962)
- Dance with Me Into the Morning (1962)
- The Forester's Daughter (1962)
- Our Crazy Nieces (1963)
- Don't Fool with Me (1963)
- With Best Regards (1963)
- The Sweet Sins of Sexy Susan (1967)

== Bibliography ==
- Dassanowsky, Robert. Austrian Cinema: A History. McFarland & Company, 2005.
