= Cornelia Froboess =

German actress (born 1943)

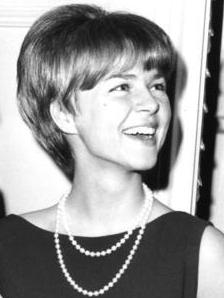
- Froboess in 1966
- Born: 28 October 1943 (age 82); Wriezen, Germany
- Occupation: Actress
- Spouse: Hellmuth Matiasek (m. 1967; died 2022)
- Children: 2

Cornelia Froboess (German: [kɔʁˈneːli̯a ˈfʁoːbøːs]; born 28 October 1943) is a German actress and a teen idol of the 1950s and early 1960s. During that time, Froboess appeared in many West German and Austrian musical films, especially after the rock and roll wave hit Germany. In those comedy films, she would often portray the typical Berliner Göre (brat from [West] Berlin) who craves independence from her strict parents.

== Career ==
As Die Kleine Cornelia she had her first hit record in 1951, aged eight, with a song written by her father. "Pack die Badehose ein" ("Pack your bathing trunks") is a cheery tune about a group of children going swimming on a hot summer's day at Wannsee. The title of the song has become a set phrase and synonym for going swimming easily recognized even by speakers of German who have never heard of the song. As she grew up, she continued recording as Conny, then Conny Froboess.

In 1962, Froboess finished in sixth place at the Eurovision Song Contest, where she sang "Zwei kleine Italiener" (Two little Italians) for Germany. It sold over one million copies and was awarded a gold disc. Froboess also recorded a Dutch (Twee Kleine Italianen) and Italian (Un Bacio Al'Italiana) version of the song. The same year she appeared as herself in Jean Renoir's comedy film The Elusive Corporal.

Later, Froboess became a theatre and movie actress. In 1982, she appeared in Rainer Werner Fassbinder's film Veronika Voss. In 1988 she played Marthe Schwerdtlein in Goethe's Faust I, a performance that was also released as a film: Faust – Vom Himmel durch die Welt zur Hölle. In 1997 Froboess played the mother of the protagonist Martin Brest (Til Schweiger) in the film Knockin' on Heaven's Door. On stage, she appeared in Lessing's Minna von Barnhelm in 1976, staged by Dieter Dorn, and played Ellida in Ibsen's The Lady from the Sea in 1990. At the Salzburg Festival 2004, she played Mary Tyrone in Eugene O'Neill's Long Day's Journey into Night. The same year she played the title role in Bertolt Brecht's play Mother Courage and Her Children.

== Selected filmography ==
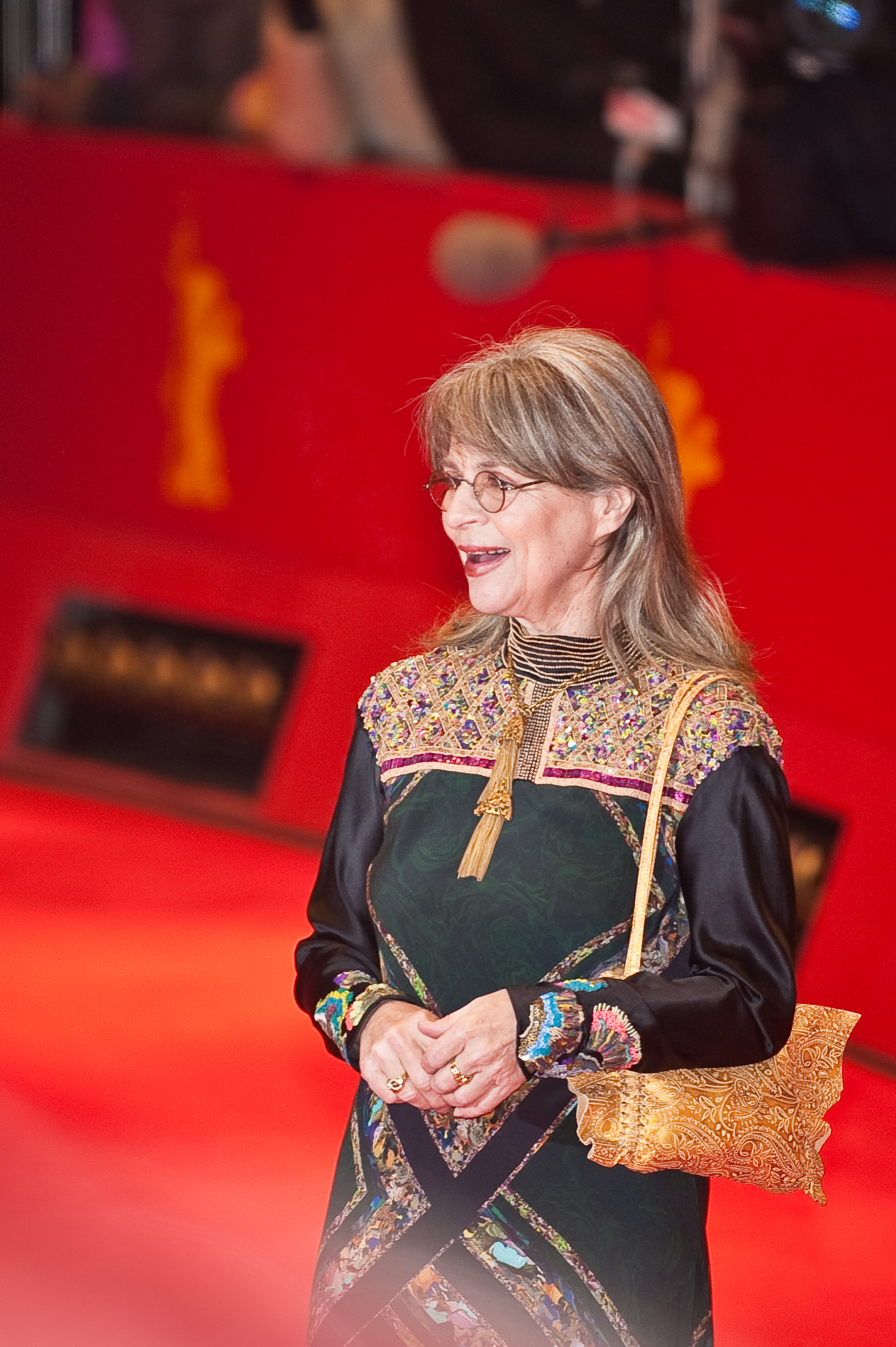
Froboess at the 2010 Berlin International Film Festival

- The Sinful Border (1951)
- Ideal Woman Sought (1952)
- Three Days of Fear (1952)
- Ten on Every Finger (1954)
- The Big Star Parade (1954)
- Let the Sun Shine Again (1955)
- Hula-Hopp, Conny (1959)
- Conny and Peter Make Music (1960)
- Mariandl (1961)
- My Husband, the Economic Miracle (1961)
- The Bird Seller (1962)
- The Model Boy (1963)
- Is Geraldine an Angel? (1963)
- Rheinsberg (1967)
- Crazy - Completely Mad (1973)
- Derrick – Season 4, episode 8: "Via Bangkok" (1977)
- Derrick – Season 5, episode 12: "Ute und Manuela" (1978)
- Derrick – Season 9, episode 2: "Eine Falle für Derrick" (1982)
- Veronika Voss (1982)
- The Summer of the Samurai (1986)
- Faust (1988)
- Judgment Day (1994, TV film)
- Windstorm (2013)
- Windstorm 2 (2015)
- Windstorm 3: Windstorm and the Wild Horses (2017)
- Windstorm 4: Ari's Arrival (2019)
- Windstorm: The Great Hurricane (2021)

== Awards ==
- 1962: Goldene Schallplatte
- 1968: Ernst-Lubitsch-Preis
- 1985: Member of the Academy of Arts, Berlin
- 1990: Gertrud-Eysoldt-Ring
- 1994: Bavarian Film Award
