= Gunther Philipp =

Austrian actor (1918–2003)

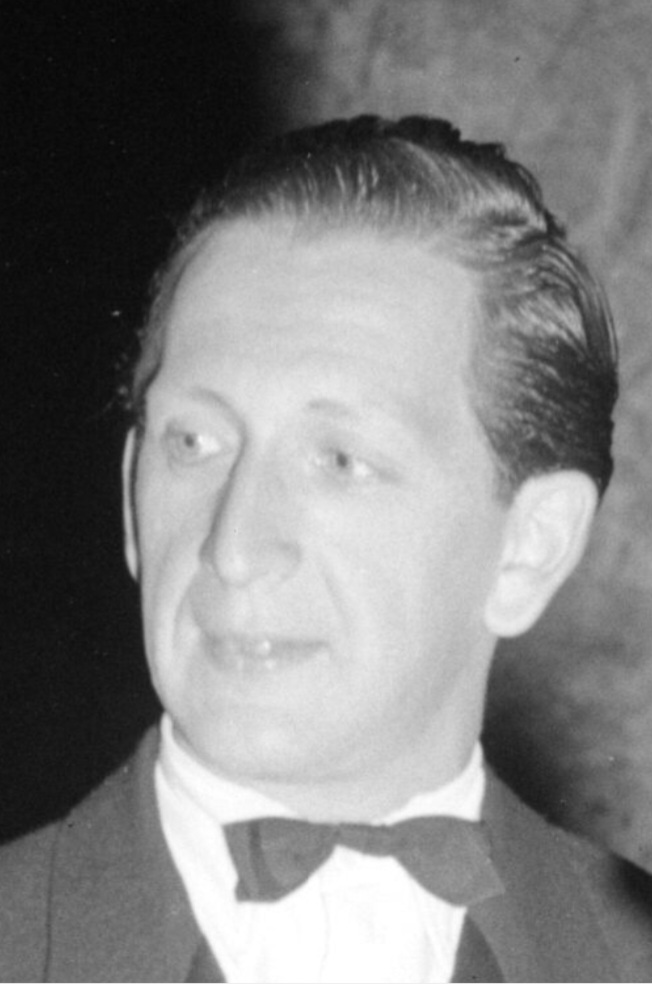
- Born: Gunther Placheta; 8 June 1918; Maroshévíz, Austria-Hungary (now Toplița, Romania)
- Died: 2 October 2003 (aged 85); Bad Godesberg, Germany
- Resting place: Melaten-Friedhof
- Education: University of Vienna
- Occupations: Film actor, television actor, physician
- Years active: 1949–2002

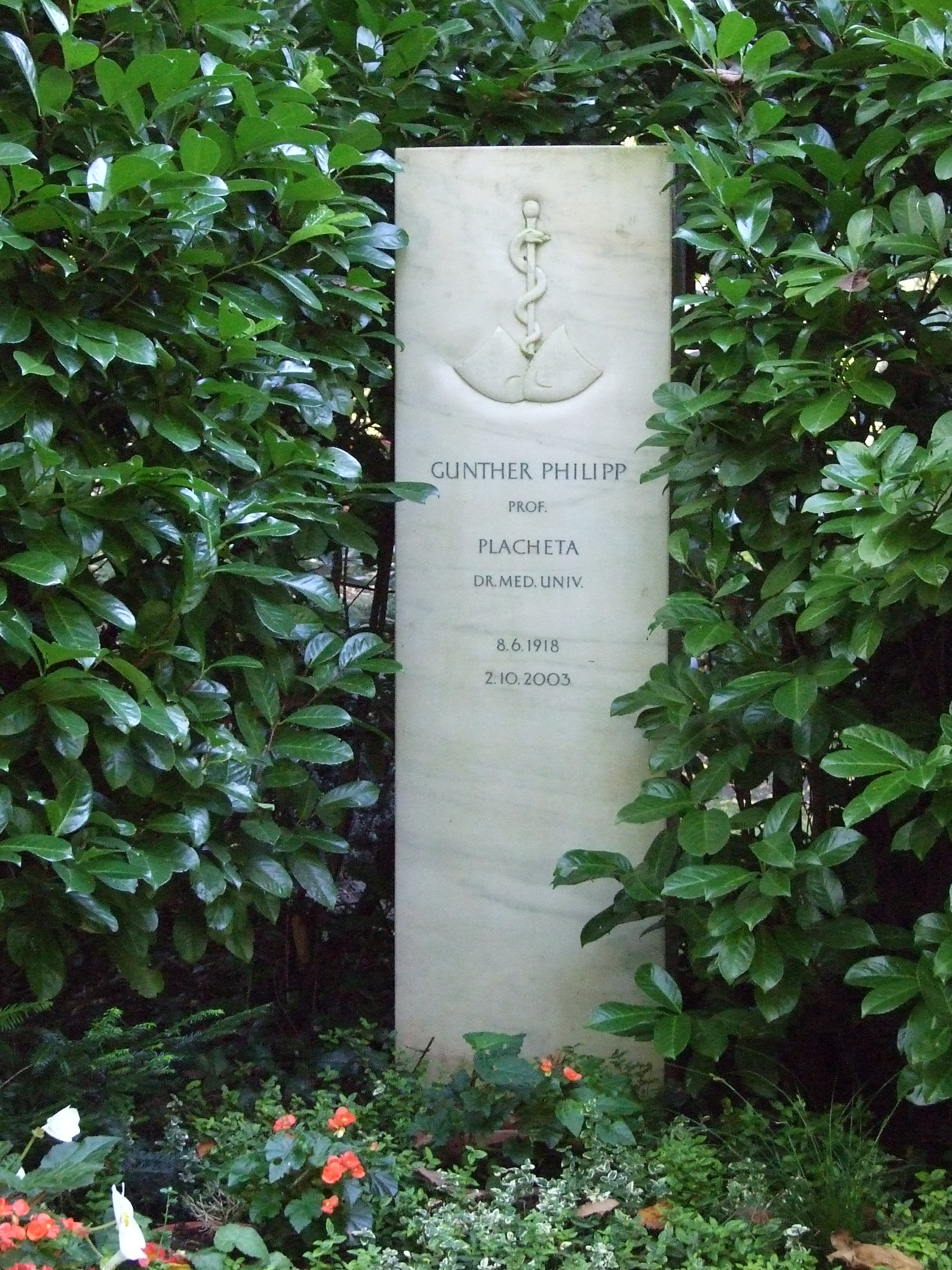
Burial site of Gunther Philipp in Cologne (2014)

Gunther Philipp (8 June 1918 – 2 October 2003) was an Austrian film actor, physician and swimmer.

From 1949 to 2002 he appeared as an actor in 147 movies for cinema and television, mainly in comic roles. As an author, Philipp wrote 21 film scripts.

== Education ==
During World War II, Philipp studied acting at the Max Reinhardt Seminar and at the University of Vienna philosophy, majoring in psychology and then medicine. In 1943 he received his doctorate in medicine (Dr. med. univ.) He held the Austrian record in the 100-meter breaststroke for 14 years. He was also in the squad of the Austrian Olympic team in Berlin in 1936, but was not nominated for political reasons because he did not want to join the National Socialist-dominated “First Vienna Amateur Sports Club”. After the war, he ran a practice in Eberstalzell in Upper Austria and was active until in the 1990s at the Vienna University Clinic for Neurology and Psychiatry.

== Selected filmography ==
- Love on Ice (1950)
- Scandal at the Embassy (1950)
- Der Schuß durchs Fenster (1950)
- Ideal Woman Sought (1952)
- The Mine Foreman (1952)
- Josef the Chaste (1953)
- The Rose of Stamboul (1953)
- Aunt Jutta from Calcutta (1953)
- The Emperor Waltz (1953)
- The Cousin from Nowhere (1953)
- Open Your Window (1953)
- Roses from the South (1954)
- The Big Star Parade (1954)
- The Congress Dances (1955)
- Yes, Yes, Love in Tyrol (1955)
- Royal Hunt in Ischl (1955)
- Marriage Sanitarium (1955)
- Request Concert (1955)
- The Beggar Student (1956)
- And Who Is Kissing Me? (1956)
- The Count of Luxemburg (1957)
- Kindermädchen für Papa gesucht (1957)
- The Legs of Dolores (1957)
- The Daring Swimmer (1957)
- The Girl Without Pyjamas (1957)
- Munchhausen in Africa (1958)
- Mikosch, the Pride of the Company (1958)
- Mikosch of the Secret Service (1959)
- Twelve Girls and One Man (1959)
- Yes, Women are Dangerous (1960)
- Bombs on Monte Carlo (1960)
- The White Horse Inn (1960)
- Season in Salzburg (1961)
- Mariandl (1961)
- You Must Be Blonde on Capri (1961)
- Our Crazy Aunts (1961)
- The Adventures of Count Bobby (1961)
- Mariandl's Homecoming (1962)
- No Kissing Under Water (1962)
- Almost Angels (1962)
- The Sweet Life of Count Bobby (1962)
- The Turkish Cucumbers (1962)
- The Merry Widow (1962)
- Die Fledermaus (1962)
- The Phone Rings Every Night (1962)
- Wedding Night in Paradise (1962)
- Our Crazy Nieces (1963)
- Is Geraldine an Angel? (1963)
- With Best Regards (1963)
- The Model Boy (1963)
- The Great Skate (1964)
- Our Crazy Aunts in the South Seas (1964)
- The World Revolves Around You (1964)
- Schweik's Awkward Years (1964)
- Aunt Frieda (1965)
- In Bed by Eight (1965)
- The Sinful Village (1966)
- Count Bobby, The Terror of The Wild West (1966)
- The Great Happiness (1967)
- Charley's Uncle (1969)
- When the Mad Aunts Arrive (1970)
- The Mad Aunts Strike Out (1971)
- Aunt Trude from Buxtehude (1971)
- My Father, the Ape and I (1971)
- Rudi, Behave! (1971)
- The Secret Carrier (1975)
- Banana Joe (1982)

== Sporting successes ==
- 1935 Austrian record 100 m breaststroke
- 1937 an Austrian record 100 m breaststroke
- 1938 Austrian record 100 m breaststroke 3 x.
- 1939 the Austrian record in the 100 m breaststroke (at the same time European year best performance: 1:11,3)
- 1939 academic world record at the German University Championships in Schrießheim Mannheim / year highs 100 m breaststroke (second in the world rankings)
- 1962 Austrian State Championship on Ferrari 250 GT
- 1963 Austrian State Championship on Ferrari GTO
- 1963 four times first in the Grand Prix of Austria (Zeltweg)

== Decorations and awards ==
- Austrian Cross of Honour for Science and Art
- Honorary Medal of the Austrian capital Vienna in Gold
