= Evi Kent =

German actress and singer

- Born: 8 March 1939 (age 87); Brno, Czechoslovakia
- Occupations: Actress, singer
- Years active: 1953–1982 (film & TV)

Evi Kent (born 8 March 1939) was a Czech-born German actress and singer.

== Biography ==
She was born in Brno in Czechoslovakia, shortly before it was occupied by Germany. She later settled in West Germany following the Expulsion of Germans from Czechoslovakia after World War II and studied acting in Berlin. One of her first film roles was in Robert Siodmak's My Father, the Actor.

== Selected filmography ==
- Mamitschka (1955)
- My Father, the Actor (1956)
- Friederike von Barring (1956)
- Jede Nacht in einem anderen Bett (1957)
- Our Crazy Aunts (1961)
- Dance with Me into the Morning (1962)
- Verrückt und zugenäht (1962)
- No Kissing Under Water (1962)
- Our Crazy Nieces (1963)
- Tomfoolery in Zell am See (1963)
- Happy-End am Wörthersee (1964)
- The World Revolves Around You (1964)
- Blue Blooms the Gentian (1973)
