= Gus Backus =

American singer (1937–2019)

- Backus in the 1960s

Background information
- Born: Donald Edgar Backus; September 12, 1937; Southampton, New York, U.S.
- Died: February 21, 2019 (aged 81) Germering, Germany
- Genres: Schlager; Pop; rock and roll; doo-wop
- Occupation: Singer
- Years active: 1957–2014
- Formerly of: The Del-Vikings

Donald Edgar "Gus" Backus (September 12, 1937 – February 21, 2019) was an American singer. He started his career as a member of The Del-Vikings and later became a successful Schlager singer in Germany.

== Life and career ==
Backus was born on Long Island and started his music career with the Del-Vikings, the first notable doo-wop group with both black and white members which had two Billboard Hot 100 Top Ten hits. After he was stationed as an airman in the U.S. Air Force at Wiesbaden Air Base in 1957, Backus had to leave The Del-Vikings and started singing Schlager music in 1960s West Germany. He sang all his songs in German with an American accent. 19 of his songs between 1960 and 1967 made the charts, including eight Top Ten hits. He landed a Number 1 hit in the German charts with his song "Der Mann im Mond" ("The Man in the Moon") in 1961. Backus also did German cover versions of songs by Elvis Presley, whom he met at one time, Paul Anka, and Conway Twitty.

In addition to singing, Backus also appeared in nearly 30 film and television productions between 1959 and 1970, often showcasing his songs.

Backus came back to America for some years in the 1970s and worked as a foreman on oil fields in Texas, later returning to Germany. He lived for the rest of his life in Germering near Munich and retired from singing in 2014. He was married three times and fathered four children.

== Discography (selection) ==
=== Studio albums ===
Year	Title	Peak position (GER)
1962	Ich hab’ mein Herz in Germany verloren	16

=== Singles ===
Year	Title	Peak position (GER)
1960	″Brauner Bär und weiße Taube″ (mit Orchester Johannes Fehring)	16
1961	″Wooden Heart (Muss i denn zum Städtele hinaus)″	2
1961	″Da sprach der alte Häuptling der Indianer″	3
1961	″Auf Wiederseh’n″	15
1961	″Heut’ kommen d’ Engerln auf Urlaub nach Wien″	25
1961	″I bin a stiller Zecher″	11
1961	″Der Mann im Mond″	1
1962	″Sauerkraut-Polka″	2
1962	″No Bier, no Wein, no Schnaps″	7
1962	″Das Lied vom Angeln″	4
1962	″Linda (Ein Haus in den Rockys)″	9
1962	″Das kleine Wunder vom großen Glück″	20
1963	″Bißchen Denken beim Schenken″	31
1963	″Er macht mich krank, der Mondschein an der Donau″	8
1963	″Mein Schimmel wartet im Himmel″	12
1963	″Sweet Emily (Goodbye Baby)″	24
1964	″Wenn doch jede Woche mal der Erste wär″	20
1966	″Bohnen in die Ohren″	30
1967	″Ein Koffer voller Souvenirs″	39
