= List of West German films of 1965 =

List of films produced in West Germany in 1965

List of West German films of 1965. Feature films produced and distributed in West Germany in 1965.

== 1965 ==
| Title | Director | Cast | Genre | Notes |
|---|---|---|---|---|
| 13 Days to Die | Manfred R. Köhler | Thomas Alder, Horst Frank, Peter Carsten, Serge Nubret | Adventure | a.k.a. Thirteen Days to Die. West German-Italian-French co-production |
| 24 Hours in the Life of a Woman | Ludwig Cremer | Agnes Fink, Michael Heltau, Walter Rilla | Drama | |
| A | Jan Lenica | —N/a | Animated film | Short film |
| Abends Kammermusik | Ludwig Cremer | Walter Rilla, Herbert Fleischmann, Peter Lühr, Peter Schütte | Crime | |
| Ein Abschiedsgeschenk | Walter Rilla | Elfriede Kuzmany, Heinz Weiss, Fritz Wepper | Drama, War | |
| Acht Stunden Zeit | Paul May | Heinz Bennent, Dagmar Altrichter, Carl Lange | Thriller | a.k.a. 8 Stunden Zeit |
| Adieu Mademoiselle | Gedeon Kovács | Violetta Ferrari, Harald Juhnke, Paul Klinger, Lukas Ammann | Comedy | |
| The Affair | Trude Kolman | Hans Caninenberg, Norbert Kappen, Martin Benrath, Xenia Pörtner, Ruth Maria Kubitschek | Drama | a.k.a. Die Affäre |
| All for Mary | Erich Neuberg | Harald Leipnitz, Hanns Lothar, Gerlinde Locker, Rose Renée Roth | Comedy | a.k.a. Drei leichte Fälle a.k.a. 3 leichte Fälle |
| Anatomie eines Unfalls | Karlheinz Bieber | Vera Tschechowa, Horst Janson, Horst Naumann | Drama | |
| Ankunft bei Nacht | Karl Peter Biltz | Anneli Granget, Gerhard Riedmann, Joseph Offenbach, Herbert Fleischmann | Thriller | |
| Antigone | Franz Peter Wirth | Andrea Jonasson, Helmut Griem, Paul Hoffmann, Heidelinde Weis | Drama | |
| Der arme Mann Luther | Franz Peter Wirth | Hans Dieter Zeidler, Hannes Messemer, Ernst Fritz Fürbringer, Paul Hoffmann | Biography | |
| Auf einem Bahnhof bei Dijon | Eberhard Itzenplitz | Almut Eggert, Alfred Balthoff, Xenia Pörtner, Peter Capell | Comedy | a.k.a. Il était une gare |
| Aunt Frieda | Werner Jacobs | Hansi Kraus, Elisabeth Flickenschildt, Rudolf Rhomberg, Heidelinde Weis, Gustav Knuth, Gunther Philipp, Beppo Brem | Comedy | |
| The Bandits of the Rio Grande | Helmuth M. Backhaus | Harald Leipnitz, Maria Perschy, Wolfgang Kieling | Adventure | |
| Bernhard Lichtenberg | Peter Beauvais | Paul Verhoeven, Klausjürgen Wussow | War, Biography | |
| Black Eagle of Santa Fe | Ernst Hofbauer | Brad Harris, Tony Kendall, Olga Schoberová, Horst Frank, Joachim Hansen, Werner Peters, Pinkas Braun, Joseph Egger | Western | West German-Italian-French co-production |
| The Blood of the Walsungs | Rolf Thiele | Gerd Baltus, Elena Nathanael, Michael Maien | Drama | Entered into the 15th Berlin International Film Festival |
| The Blue Danube | John Olden | Christiane Hörbiger, Walter Kohut, Fritz Muliar, Vilma Degischer, Erik Frey, Karl Paryla, Paul Verhoeven, Lotte Lang, Attila Hörbiger | Docudrama | a.k.a. The July Putsch. Austrian-West German co-production |
| Boeing-Boeing | Hans Quest | Harald Leipnitz, Hans Clarin, Gerlinde Locker, Monika Peitsch, Bruni Löbel | Comedy | |
| La Bohème | Film direction: Wilhelm Semmelroth, opera direction: Franco Zeffirelli | Mirella Freni | Opera, Documentary | |
| Bongo Boy | Kurt Wilhelm | Hans Clarin, Wolfgang Reichmann, Mady Rahl | Musical | a.k.a. Expresso Bongo |
| Breakfast with Julia | Kurt Wilhelm | Eva Pflug, Gunnar Möller, Gerhard Riedmann, Brigitte Grothum | Comedy | |
| The Broken Jug | Detlof Krüger | Paul Dahlke | Comedy | |
| The Burgomaster | Ludwig Cremer | Herbert Mensching, Hanns Ernst Jäger, Eva Kotthaus | Drama | a.k.a. Der Bürgermeister |
| The Canterville Ghost | Dieter Lemmel | Alfred Schieske, Ernst Ronnecker | Comedy, Fantasy | |
| Carrie | Arthur Maria Rabenalt | Uta Sax, Gunnar Möller, Günther Schramm | Musical | |
| Case for a Rebel | Michael Kehlmann | Hannes Messemer, Eric Pohlmann, Eva Pflug | Drama | |
| Champagnerlily | Hans Heinrich | Chariklia Baxevanos, Harald Juhnke, Hubert von Meyerinck, Stanislav Ledinek, Corny Collins | Musical comedy | a.k.a. Champagner-Lily |
| Coast of Skeletons | Robert Lynn | Richard Todd, Dale Robertson, Heinz Drache, Marianne Koch, Elga Andersen, Dietmar Schönherr | Adventure | Based on Edgar Wallace. British-West German-South African co-production |
| Code Name: Jaguar | Maurice Labro | Ray Danton, Roger Hanin, Pascale Petit, Horst Frank, Wolfgang Preiss, Charles Régnier | Eurospy thriller | French-Spanish-West German co-production |
| Colombe | Hans Dieter Schwarze | Heidelinde Weis, Fritz Wepper, Elisabeth Flickenschildt, Michael Hinz | Comedy | |
| The Comedy of Errors | Hans Dieter Schwarze | Claus Biederstaedt, Erik Schumann | Comedy | |
| A Copy of Madame Aupic | Gerhard Metzner | Sonja Ziemann, Vera Tschechowa, Norbert Kappen, Hermann Lenschau | Comedy | a.k.a. Madeleine und Manouche |
| Cristinas Heimreise | Ludwig Cremer | Johanna Matz, Helmut Griem, Walter Richter | Comedy | |
| Cyprienne | Wolfgang Glück | Peter Pasetti, Elfriede Kuzmany, Harald Juhnke | Comedy | a.k.a. Cyprienne oder Lassen wir uns scheiden! a.k.a. Divorçons |
| DM-Killer | Rolf Thiele | Curd Jürgens, Walter Giller, Charles Régnier, Daliah Lavi, Elga Andersen | Crime comedy | a.k.a. They're Too Much. Austrian-West German co-production |
| The Desperado Trail | Harald Reinl | Lex Barker, Pierre Brice, Rik Battaglia, Ralf Wolter | Western | a.k.a. Winnetou 3. Based on Karl May. West German-Yugoslav-Italian co-production |
| The Devil in Boston | Gerhard Klingenberg | Cornelia Froboess, Werner Hinz, Hans Caninenberg | Drama | a.k.a. Wahn |
| Diamond Walkers | Paul Martin | Harald Leipnitz, Joachim Hansen, Marisa Mell, Ann Smyrner, Simon Sabela | Adventure | West German-South African co-production |
| Diamonds Are Brittle | Nicolas Gessner | Claude Rich, Jean Seberg, Elsa Martinelli, Günther Ungeheuer, Elisabeth Flickenschildt, Ady Berber | Crime comedy | French-West German-Italian-Swiss co-production |
| Diamonds Are Dangerous | Hermann Kugelstadt | Reinhard Kolldehoff, Peer Schmidt | Thriller | |
| The Dirty Game | Terence Young, Christian-Jaque, Carlo Lizzani, Werner Klingler | Henry Fonda, Robert Ryan, Peter van Eyck, Vittorio Gassman, Annie Girardot, Bourvil, Mario Adorf, Klaus Kinski | Cold War spy film, Anthology | French-Italian-West German-American co-production |
| Don Juan oder Die Liebe zur Geometrie | Michael Kehlmann | Helmuth Lohner, Theo Lingen | Drama | |
| Doppelspiel | Hagen Mueller-Stahl | Elfriede Irrall, Walther Reyer | Thriller | a.k.a. Double Cross a.k.a. The Gentle Trap a.k.a. Husband, Dear Husband |
| The Dragon | Hans Dieter Schwarze | Christoph Bantzer, Robert Graf, Karin Anselm, Klaus Schwarzkopf, Norbert Kappen, Bum Krüger | Comedy, Fantasy | |
| Dreizehn bei Tisch | Wolfgang Liebeneiner | Harry Friedauer, Ernst Stankovski | Opera | a.k.a. 13 bei Tisch a.k.a. Gonzague |
| Duel at Sundown | Leopold Lahola | Peter van Eyck, Carole Gray, Wolfgang Kieling, Mario Girotti | Western | West German-Italian-Yugoslav co-production |
| An Enemy of the People | Oswald Döpke | Wolfgang Büttner | Drama | a.k.a. Ein Volksfeind |
| Enter a Free Man | Eberhard Itzenplitz | Rudolf Vogel | Drama | a.k.a. Der Spleen des George Riley |
| Eugénie Grandet | Günther Fleckenstein | Inken Deter, Hans Karl Friedrich, Andreas Blum, Carola Höhn, Irmgard Först, Walter Jokisch | Drama | a.k.a. Unser liebes Fräulein Grandet |
| Exil | Eberhard Itzenplitz | Hans Nielsen, Wolfgang Kieling, Ruth Hausmeister, Gisela Trowe | Drama | a.k.a. A Reason for Staying |
| Exit the King | Hanns Korngiebel | Joachim Teege, Maria Becker | Drama | a.k.a. Der König stirbt |
| The Face of Fu Manchu | Don Sharp | Christopher Lee, Nigel Green, Joachim Fuchsberger, Karin Dor | Thriller | British-West German co-production |
| Das Fahrrad | Gustav Burmester | Michael Nowka | Drama | |
| Fall erledigt – "End of Conflict" | Hermann Fortuin | Christian Doermer, Heinz Weiss, Benno Hoffmann, Dirk Dautzenberg, Horst Janson | Drama, War | |
| Der Fall Harry Domela | Wolfgang Schleif | Hanns Lothar | Docudrama | |
| Der Fall Maria Schäfer | Gedeon Kovács | Renate Schroeter | Drama | |
| Das Feuerzeichen | Frank Wisbar | Werner Schumacher, Günther Schramm, Wilhelm Borchert | Drama | |
| The Final Test | Rolf von Sydow | Horst Niendorf, Fritz Wepper, Romuald Pekny, Alice Treff, Siegfried Rauch | Comedy | a.k.a. Schlußrunde |
| Die Flasche | Helmut Käutner | Heinz Reincke, Ingrid van Bergen, Ivan Desny, Günter Strack | Comedy | a.k.a. Die Flasche – Eine Seemannsballade |
| Fluchtversuch | Theo Mezger | Erwin Linder, Ruth Hausmeister, Heinz Giese, Elisabeth Wiedemann | Drama | |
| For a Few Dollars More | Sergio Leone | Clint Eastwood, Lee Van Cleef, Gian Maria Volonté, Klaus Kinski, Joseph Egger | Western | Italian-West German-Spanish co-production |
| Die fromme Helene | Axel von Ambesser | Simone Rethel, Theo Lingen, Friedrich von Thun, Axel von Ambesser | Comedy | |
| Die Gegenprobe | Johannes Schaaf | Bruno Dietrich, Gerhard Geisler, Heli Finkenzeller, Iris Erdmann | Drama | |
| The Gentle People – A Brooklyn Fable | Gerhard Klingenberg | Alfred Balthoff, Friedrich Joloff, Hubert Suschka, Christiane Hörbiger | Crime | a.k.a. Brooklyn-Ballade |
| The Gentlemen | Rolf Thiele, Alfred Weidenmann, Franz Seitz | Paul Hubschmid, Peter van Eyck, Mario Adorf, Letícia Román, Susy Andersen | Anthology | |
| Girls Behind Bars | Rudolf Zehetgruber | Heidelinde Weis, Harald Leipnitz, Harry Riebauer | Drama | |
| Glück in Frankreich | Paul May | Hartmut Reck, Veronique Viala | Drama | |
| God's Thunder | Denys de La Patellière | Jean Gabin, Lilli Palmer, Michèle Mercier, Robert Hossein | Drama | French-Italian-West German co-production |
| Götterkinder | Franz Josef Wild | Ingrid van Bergen, Carl-Heinz Schroth, Peter Pasetti, Karin Jacobsen, Paul Verhoeven, Konrad Georg | Comedy | a.k.a. Götterkinder – Eine ergötzliche Television aus vergangener Zeit |
| Das große Ohr | Ludwig Cremer | Hubert von Meyerinck, Ernst Jacobi, Friedrich Joloff | Comedy | a.k.a. La Grande Oreille |
| Hallo – Mr. Moss | Georg Wildhagen | Bibi Johns, Peter Vogel, Gerlinde Locker | Musical | a.k.a. Bells Are Ringing |
| Halløj i himmelsengen | Erik Balling | Thomas Fritsch, Marie Versini, Malene Schwartz, Sonja Ziemann, Robert Graf, Chris Howland | Comedy | a.k.a. 2 × 2 in the Fourposter a.k.a. Two Times Two in the Fourposter. Danish-West German co-production |
| Das Haus | Rainer Wolffhardt | Karl Ludwig Lindt, Wolfgang Engels, Charlotte Schellenberg, Lutz Hochstraate, Kurt Rackelmann, Claus Hofer, Elfie Dugal | Drama | |
| Das Haus der sieben Balkone | Thomas Fantl | Johanna Wichmann, Jürgen Goslar, Marianne Lochert, Lutz Hochstraate | Drama | a.k.a. Das Haus der 7 Balkone a.k.a. La casa de los siete balcones |
| The Hell of Manitoba | Sheldon Reynolds | Lex Barker, Pierre Brice, Marianne Koch | Western | a.k.a. A Place Called Glory. West German-Spanish co-production |
| Her Cardboard Lover | Carl-Heinz Schroth | Karin Jacobsen, Hans Putz, Günter Pfitzmann | Comedy | a.k.a. Simone, der Hummer und die Ölsardine |
| Herod and Mariamne | Wilhelm Semmelroth | Antje Weisgerber, Walter Richter, Ida Ehre, Fritz Rasp, Alexander Kerst | Drama | a.k.a. Herodes und Mariamne |
| A Holiday with Piroschka | Franz Josef Gottlieb | Marie Versini, Götz George, Dietmar Schönherr, Teri Tordai | Comedy | Austrian-West German-Hungarian co-production |
| Hotel of Dead Guests | Eberhard Itzenplitz | Joachim Fuchsberger, Karin Dor, Frank Latimore, Claus Biederstaedt, Wolfgang Kieling, Ady Berber | Mystery thriller | West German-Spanish co-production |
| The House in Karp Lane | Kurt Hoffmann | Jana Brejchová, Wolfgang Kieling, Edith Schultze-Westrum, Rudolf Hrušínský, Ivan Mistrík, František Filipovský, Walter Taub, Rosl Schäfer, Helmut Schmid, Karl-Otto Alberty, Eva Maria Meineke, Jiří Holý, Václav Voska, Hana Vítová, Jan Tříska | Drama, War | a.k.a. Das Haus in der Karpfengasse |
| I Knew Her Well | Antonio Pietrangeli | Stefania Sandrelli, Jean-Claude Brialy, Nino Manfredi, Ugo Tognazzi, Mario Adorf, Joachim Fuchsberger, Karin Dor, Robert Hoffmann | Drama | Italian-French-West German co-production |
| An Ideal Husband | Detlof Krüger | Martin Benrath, Sabine Sinjen, Harald Leipnitz, Gerlinde Locker | Comedy | |
| I'm Talking About Jerusalem | Peter Beauvais | Inge Meysel, Ulli Lommel, Norbert Kappen, Ursula Lingen, Günter Mack | Drama | a.k.a. Nächstes Jahr in Jerusalem |
| Im Schatten einer Großstadt | Johannes Schaaf | Vadim Glowna, Anaid Iplicjian | Thriller | a.k.a. The Edge of Reason |
| Immer und noch ein Tag | Hans Quest | Gerd Vespermann, Marianne Mosa | Comedy | |
| In Bed by Eight | Werner Jacobs | Peter Alexander, Gitte Hænning, Ingeborg Schöner | Musical comedy | Austrian-West German co-production |
| In the Land of Cockaigne | Claus Peter Witt | Folker Bohnet, Maria Wimmer, Stefan Schnabel, Eberhard Fechner | Drama | a.k.a. Im Schlaraffenland |
| Intermezzo | Rudolf Jugert | Ingrid Resch, Hans Korte | Comedy | a.k.a. The Enchanted |
| Jean | Wolfgang Schleif | Günter Pfitzmann, Sabine Bethmann, Carl-Heinz Schroth, Grethe Weiser, Anita Kupsch | Comedy | a.k.a. The Baroness and the Butler |
| Judith | Oswald Döpke | Luitgard Im, Kurt Heintel | Drama | |
| Der Kandidat | Klaus Wagner | Alfred Balthoff, Hans Clarin, Claus Clausen, Ljuba Welitsch, Peter Striebeck, Joseph Offenbach, Heinz-Leo Fischer | Comedy | a.k.a. Le Candidat |
| Kandidat Cormoran | Wolfgang Liebeneiner | Herbert Stass, Erwin Linder, Günther Schramm | Drama | |
| Der Kardinal von Spanien | August Everding | Paul Verhoeven, Maria Becker | Drama | a.k.a. Le Cardinal d'Espagne |
| Die Katze im Sack | Jürgen Roland | Hanns Lothar | Crime | a.k.a. Lay Her Among the Lilies |
| Keine Angst vor der Hölle? | Oswald Döpke | Violetta Ferrari, Hartmut Reck | Crime comedy | a.k.a. Et l'enfer, Isabelle? |
| Die Kette an deinem Hals | Claus Peter Witt | Gertraud Heise | Drama | |
| King Nicolo, or Such is Life | Wilhelm Semmelroth | Hans Caninenberg, Ulli Philipp | Drama | a.k.a. König Nicolo oder So ist das Leben |
| Kingdom of the Silver Lion | Franz Josef Gottlieb | Lex Barker, Marie Versini, Ralf Wolter, Sieghardt Rupp | Adventure | a.k.a. Fury of the Sabers a.k.a. Attack of the Kurds. Based on Karl May. West German-Spanish co-production |
| Klaus Fuchs – Geschichte eines Atomverrats | Ludwig Cremer | Robert Graf, Josef Meinrad, Walter Rilla, Werner Peters, Margot Trooger | Docudrama | |
| Ladies and Hussars | Korbinian Köberle | Ilse Ritter, Wolfgang Jansen, Erwin Linder, Otto Kuhlmann, Ilsemarie Schnering, Ursula Grabley, Georg Lehn, Eduard Linkers | Comedy | |
| Lady Windermere's Fan | Charles Régnier | Anaid Iplicjian, Pamela Wedekind, Karl Schönböck, Romuald Pekny | Comedy | |
| Das Landhaus | Ludwig Cremer | Ingrid Andree, Robert Graf, Rolf Boysen | Thriller | a.k.a. Du côté de l'enfer a.k.a. La Grande Bretèche |
| Last Act but One: Brundibár | Walter Krüttner | | Documentary, War | |
| The Last of Mrs. Cheyney | Erik Ode | Johanna von Koczian, Eckart Dux, Erich Schellow, Agnes Windeck | Comedy | a.k.a. Frau Cheneys Ende. |
| The Last Tomahawk | Harald Reinl | Joachim Fuchsberger, Karin Dor, Anthony Steffen, Daniel Martín, Carl Lange | Western | West German-Italian-Spanish co-production |
| The Late Edwina Black | Günter Gräwert | Ruth Maria Kubitschek, Günther Ungeheuer, Edith Schultze-Westrum, Hermann Lenschau | Crime | a.k.a. Die selige Edwina Black |
| Late Love | Karl Fruchtmann | Erik Schumann, Maria Emo, Senta Wengraf, Fritz Wepper | Drama | a.k.a. Späte Liebe |
| Legacy of the Incas | Georg Marischka | Guy Madison, Rik Battaglia, Fernando Rey, Francisco Rabal, Heinz Erhardt | Adventure | Based on Karl May. West German-Italian-Spanish co-production |
| Die letzten Drei der Albatros | Wolfgang Becker | Joachim Hansen, Harald Juhnke, Horst Frank | Adventure | a.k.a. Mutiny in the South Seas. West German-Italian-French co-production |
| Lumpaci the Vagabond | Edwin Zbonek | Helmut Qualtinger, Kurt Sowinetz, Alfred Böhm, Lotte Lang | Comedy | a.k.a. Lumpazivagabundus a.k.a. Lumpacivagabundus. Austrian-West German co-production |
| Mach's Beste draus | Peter Beauvais | Sabine Sinjen, Dirk Dautzenberg, Helga Feddersen, Siegfried Rauch | Drama | |
| Mademoiselle Löwenzorn | Gerhard Klingenberg | Anne-Marie Blanc, Heinz Moog, Alexander Kerst, Friedrich Joloff, Horst Niendorf | Crime | |
| Magic | Fritz Umgelter | Helmuth Lohner, Miriam Spoerri, Hellmut Lange | Comedy | |
| Man Called Gringo | Roy Rowland | Götz George, Alexandra Stewart, Sieghardt Rupp | Western | West German-Spanish co-production |
| Man soll den Onkel nicht vergiften | Rolf von Sydow | Hans W. Hamacher, Robert Meyn, Rudolf Schündler, Hans Deppe | Crime comedy | |
| Manhattan Night of Murder | Harald Philipp | George Nader, Heinz Weiss, Richard Münch | Thriller | Jerry Cotton film. West German-French co-production |
| Mariana Pineda | Wilm ten Haaf | Krista Keller, Friedrich Joloff, Günther Schramm, Helmut Förnbacher, Ulli Philipp | Drama | |
| Marvelous Angelique | Bernard Borderie | Michèle Mercier, Giuliano Gemma, Jean Rochefort, Jean-Louis Trintignant, Charles Régnier, Robert Hoffmann, Ernst Schröder | Adventure | French-West German-Italian co-production |
| Medea | Joachim Hess | Herta Kravina, Jürgen Goslar, Ida Ehre, Ernst Fritz Fürbringer | Drama | |
| Mercadet | Paul Hoffmann | Romuald Pekny, Karola Ebeling, Eckart Dux, Fritz Wepper | Comedy | a.k.a. Die Geschäfte des Herrn Mercadet |
| Michael Kramer | Peter Beauvais | Martin Held, Karin Baal, Ernst Jacobi, Gert Haucke, Dirk Dautzenberg | Drama | |
| The Moment of Peace | Georges Franju, Egon Monk, Tadeusz Konwicki | Hélène Dieudonné, Michel Robert, Marian Opania, Gustaw Holoubek, Bernard Ładysz, Zdzisław Maklakiewicz, Peter Kappner, Lutz Mackensy, Harry Gillmann | War, Anthology | West German-French-Polish co-production |
| Mozambique | Robert Lynn | Steve Cochran, Hildegard Knef, Paul Hubschmid, Vivi Bach | Thriller | British-West German co-production |
| Der müde Theodor | Erich Neureuther | Willy Reichert, Monika Peitsch, Herbert Bötticher, Kathrin Ackermann | Comedy | a.k.a. Tired Theodore |
| Nachruf auf Egon Müller | Hans Dieter Schwarze | Carl-Heinz Schroth, Hubert von Meyerinck | Comedy, Fantasy | |
| Der Nebbich | Peter Zadek | Heinz Bennent, Lola Müthel | Comedy | |
| Neues vom Hexer | Alfred Vohrer | Heinz Drache, Barbara Rütting, Klaus Kinski, René Deltgen, Margot Trooger, Eddi Arent, Brigitte Horney, Siegfried Schürenberg | Mystery thriller | a.k.a. Again the Ringer. Based on Edgar Wallace |
| Niemandsland | Karlheinz Bieber | Ilse Steppat, Romuald Pekny | Science fiction, War | a.k.a. The Offshore Island |
| Ninotchka | Imo Moszkowicz | Ruth Leuwerik, Peter Weck, Hannes Messemer | Comedy | |
| Nju | Wilhelm Semmelroth | Ellen Schwiers, Günther Ungeheuer, Paul Edwin Roth | Drama | |
| Not Reconciled | Straub–Huillet | Chargesheimer, Danièle Huillet | Drama | a.k.a. Nicht versöhnt oder Es hilft nur Gewalt, wo Gewalt herrscht |
| Now They Sing Again | Fritz Umgelter | Michael Hinz, Wilhelm Borchert, Cordula Trantow | War, Drama | |
| Oberst Wennerström | Helmut Ashley | Paul Hoffmann, Martin Benrath, Lola Müthel, Kurt Meisel, Friedrich Joloff, Siegfried Wischnewski, Herbert Fleischmann | Docudrama, Cold War spy film | a.k.a. Colonel Wennerström |
| The Oil Prince | Harald Philipp | Stewart Granger, Pierre Brice, Harald Leipnitz, Macha Méril, Heinz Erhardt | Western | a.k.a. Rampage at Apache Wells. Based on Karl May. West German-Yugoslav co-production |
| Old Surehand | Alfred Vohrer | Stewart Granger, Pierre Brice, Larry Pennell, Letícia Román | Western | a.k.a. Flaming Frontier. Based on Karl May. West German-Yugoslav co-production |
| Olivia | Rolf von Sydow | Dagmar Altrichter, Hans Söhnker, Fritz Wepper | Comedy | a.k.a. Love In Idleness |
| Ondine | Peter Beauvais | Sabine Sinjen, Siegfried Rauch | Fantasy | a.k.a. Undine |
| Our Man in Jamaica | Mel Welles | Larry Pennell, Brad Harris, Wolfgang Kieling, Barbara Valentin | Eurospy thriller | Italian-Spanish-West German co-production |
| Out at Sea | Rolf Hädrich | Wolfgang Reichmann, Joachim Teege | Black comedy | a.k.a. Auf hoher See |
| Der Parasit | Wilm ten Haaf | Alexander Hegarth, Paul Klinger | Comedy | |
| Paris muss brennen! | Rudolf Jugert | Wolfgang Büttner | War, Docudrama | a.k.a. Paris muß brennen! – Die Rettung der französischen Hauptstadt durch den General von Choltitz |
| Patterns | Rolf Hädrich | Hanns Lothar, Carl Lange, Ernst Fritz Fürbringer | Drama | a.k.a. The New Man |
| Platons Gastmahl | Walter Rilla | Heinz Moog | Drama | |
| Praetorius | Kurt Hoffmann | Heinz Rühmann, Liselotte Pulver | Comedy | |
| The Pyramid of the Sun God | Robert Siodmak | Lex Barker, Gérard Barray, Michèle Girardon, Ralf Wolter | Western, Adventure | Based on Karl May. West German-French-Italian co-production |
| Radetzkymarsch | Michael Kehlmann | Helmuth Lohner, Leopold Rudolf, Helmut Qualtinger, Hans Jaray, Rudolf Rhomberg | Drama | a.k.a. Radetzky March. Austrian-West German co-production |
| Red Dragon | Ernst Hofbauer | Stewart Granger, Rosanna Schiaffino, Horst Frank, Harald Juhnke | Eurospy thriller | Italian-West German co-production |
| Das Rendezvous | Thomas Fantl | Anna Vankowa, Herbert Fleischmann | Drama | |
| Requiem for a Nun | Kurt Meisel | Olive Moorefield, Ursula Lingen, Dieter Borsche, Rolf Boysen, Paul Hartmann | Drama | |
| The Respectful Prostitute | Theodor Grädler | Ingrid van Bergen, William Ray, Karl Michael Vogler, Leonard Steckel | Drama | |
| Romulus the Great | Helmut Käutner | Romuald Pekny, Brigitte Grothum, Christian Doermer | Comedy | |
| Roots | Peter Beauvais | Hannelore Hoger, Bruni Löbel, Dirk Dautzenberg, Carl Wery | Drama | a.k.a. Tag für Tag |
| Rückkehr von den Sternen | Franz Peter Wirth | Hellmut Lange, Lina Carstens, Alfred Balthoff, Gertrud Kückelmann | Drama | a.k.a. Revenu de l'étoile |
| Die Sakramentskarosse | Ulrich Erfurth | Elfriede Irrall, Willy Birgel, Hans Korte | Comedy | a.k.a. Le carrosse du Saint-Sacrement |
| Die Schelme im Paradies | Wolfgang Liebeneiner | Wolfgang Reichmann, Karl-Maria Schley, Günther Lüders, Bruni Löbel, Gisela Trowe, Gundolf Willer | Comedy | |
| Schloßpension Fürstenhorst | Sam Besekow | Karin Baal, Otto Kuhlmann, Willy Trenk-Trebitsch | Comedy | |
| Die Schlüssel | Paul May | Harald Leipnitz, Albert Lieven, Christian Wolff, Dagmar Altrichter, Benno Hoffmann, Bum Krüger, Friedrich Joloff | Mystery thriller | a.k.a. The Desperate People |
| Schuldig | Ilo von Jankó | Luitgard Im, Michael Degen, Hans Korte | Drama | a.k.a. The Guilty a.k.a. Die Tage des Menschen sind wie der Wind |
| The Secret Sharer | Günther Fleckenstein | Günther Tabor | Drama, Adventure | a.k.a. Der geheime Teilhaber |
| Seraphine oder Die wundersame Geschichte der Tante Flora | Peter Lilienthal | Heinz Meier | Black comedy | |
| Serenade for Two Spies | Michael Pfleghar | Hellmut Lange, Tony Kendall, Barbara Lass, Heidelinde Weis, Wolfgang Neuss | Spy comedy | West German-Italian co-production |
| The Shadow of a Gunman | Hermann Fortuin | Hartmut Reck, Walter Richter, Vera Tschechowa | Drama | a.k.a. Der Rebell, der keiner war |
| Shots in Threequarter Time | Alfred Weidenmann | Pierre Brice, Heinz Drache, Daliah Lavi, Senta Berger, Anton Diffring, Jana Brejchová, Charles Régnier, Walter Giller, Gustav Knuth | Eurospy | a.k.a. Operation Solo. Austrian-Italian-West German co-production |
| The Sinister Monk | Harald Reinl | Karin Dor, Harald Leipnitz, Siegfried Lowitz, Siegfried Schürenberg, Eddi Arent | Mystery thriller | Based on Edgar Wallace |
| Die Sommerfrische | Peter Beauvais | Brigitte Grothum, Sabine Sinjen, Siegfried Rauch, Erik Schumann, Paul Dahlke | Comedy | |
| South Sea Bubble | Kurt Wilhelm | Karin Jacobsen, Robert Owens, Alexander Kerst, Friedrich Joloff | Comedy | a.k.a. Südsee-Affäre |
| Der Spielverderber – Das kurze, verstörte Leben des Kaspar Hauser | Edward Rothe | Peter Brogle, Horst Tappert, Gert Westphal | Historical drama | |
| St. Pauli Herbertstraße | Ákos Ráthonyi | Eva Astor, Pinkas Braun | Crime drama | a.k.a. The Street of Sin |
| Sugar | Oswald Döpke | Claudia Wedekind, Herbert Fleischmann, Günter Strack | Drama | |
| Der Sündenbock | Fritz Umgelter | Therese Giehse, René Deltgen, Wolfgang Kieling, Ulli Philipp, Dagmar Altrichter, Hellmut Lange | Crime | |
| Sunscorched | Mark Stevens, Jaime Jesús Balcázar | Mark Stevens, Marianne Koch, Mario Adorf | Western | a.k.a. Jessy Does Not Forgive... He Kills!. Spanish-West German co-production |
| The Swedish Girl | Kurt Wilhelm | Paul Hubschmid, Letícia Román, Thomas Fritsch, Margot Trooger | Comedy | a.k.a. Die schwedische Jungfrau |
| Tabula Rasa | Detlof Krüger | Paul Dahlke, Michael Degen | Comedy | |
| Ein Tag – Bericht aus einem deutschen Konzentrationslager 1939 | Egon Monk | Hartmut Reck, Heinz Giese, Josef Fröhlich, Ernst Jacobi, Gert Haucke | Drama, War | |
| Der Tag danach | Rudolf Jugert | Marianne Schönauer, Egon von Jordan, Lotte Ledl | History | a.k.a. Mayerling: Der Tag danach |
| Ein Tag im April | Franz Josef Wild | Agnes Fink, Gundolf Willer | Drama | |
| Tausend Takte Übermut | Ernst Hofbauer | Vivi Bach, Rex Gildo, Gunther Philipp, Gus Backus, Peggy March | Musical comedy | a.k.a. 1000 Takte Übermut |
| That Man in Istanbul | Antonio Isasi-Isasmendi | Horst Buchholz, Sylva Koscina, Mario Adorf, Klaus Kinski | Thriller | Spanish-Italian-West German co-production |
| Time Lock | Theo Mezger | Hannelore Hoger, Horst Niendorf, Werner Kreindl, Ulrich Matschoss | Thriller | a.k.a. Zeitsperre |
| Tread Softly | Fritz Umgelter | George Nader, Heinz Weiss, Richard Münch | Thriller | a.k.a. The Violin Case Murders a.k.a. Operation Hurricane: Friday Noon. First in the Jerry Cotton series of films. West German-French co-production |
| The Treasure of the Aztecs | Robert Siodmak | Lex Barker, Gérard Barray, Ralf Wolter | Western, Adventure | Based on Karl May. West German-French-Italian co-production |
| The True Jacob | Erich Neureuther | Willy Reichert, Grit Boettcher, Wolfgang Völz | Comedy | a.k.a. Der wahre Jakob |
| Überstunden | Fritz Umgelter | Stephan Schwartz, Maria Körber, Günther Neutze, Alfred Schieske, Günter Pfitzmann | Drama | |
| Uncle Tom's Cabin | Géza von Radványi | John Kitzmiller, Olive Moorefield, Harold Bradley, Catana Cayetano, Herbert Lom, O. W. Fischer, Mylène Demongeot, Juliette Gréco, Eartha Kitt | Drama | West German-French-Italian-Yugoslav co-production |
| Uncle Vanya | Peter Beauvais | Sabine Sinjen, Carl Lange, Siegfried Wischnewski, Albrecht Schoenhals, Sonja Sutter | Drama | |
| Uncle's Dream | Günter Gräwert | Rosl Schäfer, Monika Berg, Rudolf Vogel | Comedy | a.k.a. Onkelchens Traum |
| Und nicht mehr Jessica | Falk Harnack | Horst Naumann, Margot Trooger, Marthe Keller, Wolfgang Büttner | Drama | a.k.a. Point of No Return |
| Die Unverbesserlichen | Claus Peter Witt | Inge Meysel, Joseph Offenbach, Monika Peitsch, Gernot Endemann, Helga Anders | Drama | Stand-alone TV film, followed by six sequels (Die Unverbesserlichen) |
| Verhör am Nachmittag | Walter Davy | Hans Nielsen, Anaid Iplicjian, Vera Tschechowa | Crime | |
| Die verschlossene Tür | Dieter Lemmel | Leopold Biberti, Karl-Georg Saebisch | Drama, War | |
| Vor Nachbarn wird gewarnt | Paul Verhoeven | Ernst Stankovski, Chariklia Baxevanos, Karl Walter Diess | Thriller | a.k.a. Meet a Body a.k.a. Beware of Neighbors |
| Welcome to Our City | Frank Wisbar | William Ray, Wilhelm Borchert, Albert Lieven, Catana Cayetano, Bruno Dietrich, Robert Owens | Drama | a.k.a. Welcome to Altamont |
| Wer weint um Juckenack? | Harald Benesch | Karl-Maria Schley | Drama | |
| What Men Live By | Thomas Fantl | Rüdiger Bahr, Werner Eichhorn, Eva Kotthaus | Drama | a.k.a. Wovon die Menschen leben |
| When the Grapevines Bloom on the Danube | Géza von Cziffra | Hansjörg Felmy, Ingeborg Schöner, Letícia Román, Peter Weck | Comedy | Austrian-West German co-production |
| Who Wants to Sleep? | Rolf Thiele, Alfred Weidenmann, Axel von Ambesser | Curd Jürgens, Catherine Deneuve, Gert Fröbe, Nadja Tiller, Anita Ekberg, Heinz Rühmann, Johanna von Koczian, Peter Alexander | Anthology | a.k.a. Daisy Chain a.k.a. Das Liebeskarussell. Austrian-West German co-production |
| Widowers' Houses | Dietrich Haugk | Peter Arens, Katinka Hoffmann, Paul Hoffmann, Romuald Pekny | Comedy | a.k.a. Die Häuser des Herrn Sartorius |
| Wild Kurdistan | Franz Josef Gottlieb | Lex Barker, Marie Versini, Ralf Wolter | Adventure | a.k.a. The Wild Men of Kurdistan. Based on Karl May. West German-Spanish co-production |
| The Winter's Tale | Gerhard Klingenberg | Peter Lühr, Cornelia Froboess, Christoph Bantzer, Ernst Fritz Fürbringer, Agnes Fink | Comedy | |
| Yerma | Oswald Döpke | Elisabeth Orth, Klausjürgen Wussow, Hartmut Reck, Edith Schultze-Westrum | Drama | |

== See also ==
- List of Austrian films of 1965
- List of East German films of 1965

== Bibliography ==
- Bergfelder, Tim. International Adventures: German Popular Cinema and European Co-Productions in the 1960s. Berghahn Books, 2005.
