= List of West German films of 1964 =

List of films produced in West Germany in 1964

List of West German films of 1964. Feature films produced and distributed in West Germany in 1964.

== 1964 ==
Title	Director	Cast	Genre	Notes
Among Vultures	Alfred Vohrer	Stewart Granger, Pierre Brice, Elke Sommer, Götz George, Sieghardt Rupp	Western	a.k.a. Frontier Hellcat. Based on Karl May. West German-Yugoslav-French-Italian co-production
Angélique, Marquise des Anges	Bernard Borderie	Michèle Mercier, Robert Hossein, Jean Rochefort, Giuliano Gemma, Robert Hoffmann, Charles Régnier, Renate Ewert	Adventure	French-West German-Italian co-production
Blood and Black Lace	Mario Bava	Cameron Mitchell, Eva Bartok, Mary Arden	Thriller	Italian-West German-French co-production
Bullets Don't Argue	Mario Caiano	Rod Cameron, Horst Frank, Ángel Aranda, Vivi Bach, Hans Nielsen, Kai Fischer	Western	Italian-Spanish-West German co-production
Cave of the Living Dead	Ákos Ráthonyi	Adrian Hoven, Wolfgang Preiss, Erika Remberg, Carl Möhner, John Kitzmiller	Horror	West German-Yugoslav co-production
The Cavern	Edgar G. Ulmer	John Saxon, Rosanna Schiaffino, Larry Hagman, Brian Aherne, Hans von Borsody, Joachim Hansen	War drama	American-West German-Italian co-production
Coffin from Hong Kong	Manfred R. Köhler	Heinz Drache, Elga Andersen, Ralf Wolter	Thriller	West German-French co-production
Condemned to Sin	Alfred Weidenmann	Martin Held, Hildegard Knef, Heidelinde Weis	Drama	a.k.a. The Fortress
The Curse of the Hidden Vault	Franz Josef Gottlieb	Harald Leipnitz, Judith Dornys, Rudolf Forster, Siegfried Schürenberg, Klaus Kinski, Eddi Arent	Mystery thriller	Based on Edgar Wallace
Dead Woman from Beverly Hills	Michael Pfleghar	Heidelinde Weis, Klausjürgen Wussow, Horst Frank, Wolfgang Neuss, The Kessler Twins	Crime comedy	Entered into the 1964 Cannes Film Festival
Destination Death	Wolfgang Staudte	Götz George, Hans Nielsen, Mira Stupica, Olivera Marković, Milena Dravić	Drama	a.k.a. Herrenpartie. West German-Yugoslav co-production. Entered into the 14th Berlin International Film Festival
Dog Eat Dog	Ray Nazarro	Jayne Mansfield, Cameron Mitchell, Elisabeth Flickenschildt, Pinkas Braun, Werner Peters	Crime thriller	Italian-West German co-production
Don't Tell Me Any Stories	Dietrich Haugk	Heidelinde Weis, Karl Michael Vogler, Georg Thomalla	Comedy	a.k.a. Erzähl mir nichts
Emil and the Detectives	Peter Tewksbury	Walter Slezak, Roger Mobley, Heinz Schubert	Comedy crime	American-West-German co-production
Encounter in Salzburg	Max Friedmann	Curd Jürgens, Danièle Gaubert, Nadia Gray, Viktor de Kowa	Drama	West German-French co-production
Fanny Hill	Russ Meyer	Letícia Román, Miriam Hopkins, Ulli Lommel, Chris Howland	Historical comedy	American-West German co-production
A Fistful of Dollars	Sergio Leone	Clint Eastwood, Marianne Koch, Gian Maria Volonté, Sieghardt Rupp, Wolfgang Lukschy, Joseph Egger	Western	Italian-Spanish-West German co-production
Five Thousand Dollars on One Ace	Alfonso Balcázar	Robert Woods, Fernando Sancho, Maria Sebaldt, Helmut Schmid, Richard Häussler, Hans Nielsen	Western	Italian-Spanish-West German co-production
Freddy in the Wild West	Sobey Martin	Freddy Quinn, Rik Battaglia, Mamie Van Doren	Western, Musical	West German-Yugoslav co-production
Freddy, Tiere, Sensationen	Karl Vibach	Freddy Quinn	Musical	
Frozen Alive	Bernard Knowles	Mark Stevens, Marianne Koch, Wolfgang Lukschy, Joachim Hansen	Science fiction	British-West German co-production
Frühstück mit dem Tod	Franz Antel	Wolfgang Preiss, Sonja Ziemann, Loni von Friedl, Robert Graf, Ivan Desny	Crime	a.k.a. Homicidal Lady. West German-Austrian co-production
Full Hearts and Empty Pockets	Camillo Mastrocinque	Thomas Fritsch, Alexandra Stewart, Gino Cervi, Senta Berger	Comedy	Italian-West German co-production
Games of Desire	Hans Albin, Peter Berneis	Ingrid Thulin, Paul Hubschmid, Claudine Auger	Drama	West German-French co-production
The Girl from the Islands	Boštjan Hladnik	Jane Axell, Gunnar Möller	Comedy	Swedish-West German co-production
Golden Goddess of Rio Beni	Eugenio Martín, Franz Eichhorn	Pierre Brice, Gillian Hills, Harald Juhnke	Adventure	West German-Spanish-Brazilian co-production
The Great Skate	Franz Antel	Marika Kilius, Hans-Jürgen Bäumler, Heinz Erhardt, Peter Kraus	Musical comedy	West German-Austrian co-production
Help, My Bride Steals	Werner Jacobs	Peter Alexander, Cornelia Froboess	Comedy	Austrian-West German co-production
Der Hexer	Alfred Vohrer	Joachim Fuchsberger, Heinz Drache, Siegfried Lowitz, Eddi Arent, Jochen Brockmann, Margot Trooger, René Deltgen, Siegfried Schürenberg	Mystery thriller	a.k.a. The Ringer a.k.a. The Mysterious Magician. Based on Edgar Wallace
Holiday in St. Tropez	Ernst Hofbauer	Vivi Bach, Ann Smyrner	Comedy	
I Learned It from Father	Axel von Ambesser	Willy Fritsch, Thomas Fritsch	Comedy	West German-Austrian co-production
If You Go Swimming in Tenerife	Helmuth M. Backhaus	Geneviève Cluny, Peter Kraus, Gunnar Möller	Comedy	
The Inn on Dartmoor	Rudolf Zehetgruber	Heinz Drache, Ingmar Zeisberg, Paul Klinger, Ralf Wolter	Mystery thriller	
Kidnapped to Mystery Island	Luigi Capuano	Guy Madison, Ingeborg Schöner, Peter van Eyck	Adventure	Italian-West German co-production
Lana, Queen of the Amazons	Géza von Cziffra	Catherine Schell, Anton Diffring, Michael Hinz, Christian Wolff	Adventure	West German-Brazilian co-production
Last of the Renegades	Harald Reinl	Lex Barker, Pierre Brice, Karin Dor, Anthony Steel, Klaus Kinski	Western	a.k.a. Winnetou 2. Based on Karl May. West German-Yugoslav-Italian-French co-production
The Last Ride to Santa Cruz	Rolf Olsen	Edmund Purdom, Mario Adorf, Marianne Koch, Klaus Kinski, Sieghardt Rupp	Western	Austrian-West German co-production
Legend of a Gunfighter	Rolf Olsen	Thomas Fritsch, Ron Randell, Walter Giller, Gustav Knuth, Judith Dornys	Western	Austrian-West German co-production
A Man in His Prime	Franz Peter Wirth	Karl Michael Vogler, Pascale Audret, Françoise Prévost, Hellmut Lange, Marisa Mell	Drama	
Mark of the Tortoise	Alfred Vohrer	Götz George, Hildegard Knef, Richard Münch	Krimi	a.k.a. Wartezimmer zum Jenseits
Massacre at Marble City	Paul Martin	Mario Adorf, Brad Harris, Horst Frank, Olga Schoberová, Ralf Wolter, Dieter Borsche, Marianne Hoppe, Joseph Egger	Western	West German-French-Italian co-production
The Merry Wives of Tyrol	Hans Billian	Hannelore Auer, Gus Backus, Rudolf Prack	Musical comedy	
A Mission for Mr. Dodd	Günter Gräwert	Heinz Rühmann, Maria Sebaldt, Anton Diffring, Mario Adorf	Comedy	
Mission to Hell	Gianfranco Parolini	Paul Hubschmid, Marianne Hold, Horst Frank, Brad Harris, Chris Howland	Adventure	a.k.a. Die Diamantenhölle am Mekong. West German-Italian-French co-production
Mission to Venice	André Versini	Sean Flynn, Karin Baal, Hannes Messemer, Madeleine Robinson, Ettore Manni	Thriller	French-Italian-West German co-production
Monsieur	Jean-Paul Le Chanois	Jean Gabin, Liselotte Pulver, Mireille Darc, Philippe Noiret, Peter Vogel	Comedy	French-West German co-production
The Monster of London City	Edwin Zbonek	Hansjörg Felmy, Marianne Koch, Dietmar Schönherr	Mystery thriller	
Murderer in the Fog	Eugen York	Hansjörg Felmy, Ingmar Zeisberg	Crime	
Mystery of the Red Jungle	Helmut Ashley	Maria Perschy, Dietmar Schönherr, Brad Harris, Horst Frank	Thriller	West German-Italian-French co-production
No Survivors, Please	Hans Albin, Peter Berneis	Maria Perschy, Uwe Friedrichsen, Karen Blanguernon	Science fiction	
Old Shatterhand	Hugo Fregonese	Lex Barker, Pierre Brice, Guy Madison, Daliah Lavi, Rik Battaglia, Ralf Wolter	Western	a.k.a. Apache's Last Battle. Based on Karl May. West German-Yugoslav-French-Italian co-production
The Phantom of Soho	Franz Josef Gottlieb	Dieter Borsche, Barbara Rütting, Hans Söhnker	Mystery thriller	
Polizeirevier Davidswache	Jürgen Roland	Wolfgang Kieling, Günther Ungeheuer, Günther Neutze, Hannelore Schroth, Jürgen Draeger, Hanns Lothar	Crime thriller	a.k.a. Hamburg: City of Vice a.k.a. Seven Consenting Adults a.k.a. 7 Consenting Adults
The River Line	Rudolf Jugert	Peter van Eyck, Marie Versini, Fritz Wepper, Walter Rilla	War	a.k.a. Kennwort: Reiher
Room 13	Harald Reinl	Joachim Fuchsberger, Karin Dor, Siegfried Schürenberg, Eddi Arent, Hans Clarin	Mystery thriller	Based on Edgar Wallace
The Secret of the Chinese Carnation	Rudolf Zehetgruber	Brad Harris, Olga Schoberová, Horst Frank, Klaus Kinski, Dietmar Schönherr	Eurospy thriller	West German-French-Italian co-production
The Secret of Dr. Mabuse	Hugo Fregonese	Peter van Eyck, O. E. Hasse, Yvonne Furneaux, Yoko Tani, Leo Genn, Robert Beatty, Valéry Inkijinoff	Eurospy thriller	a.k.a. The Death Ray Mirror of Dr. Mabuse. West German-Italian-French co-production
The Seventh Victim	Franz Josef Gottlieb	Hansjörg Felmy, Ann Smyrner, Hans Nielsen, Helmuth Lohner	Mystery thriller	a.k.a. The 7th Victim a.k.a. The Racetrack Murders
The Shoot	Robert Siodmak	Lex Barker, Ralf Wolter, Marie Versini	Adventure	Based on Karl May. West German-Yugoslav-French-Italian co-production
Tales of a Young Scamp	Helmut Käutner	Hansi Kraus, Elisabeth Flickenschildt, Rudolf Rhomberg, Heidelinde Weis, Georg Thomalla, Harald Juhnke, Beppo Brem	Comedy	a.k.a. Lausbubengeschichten
Three for a Robbery	Gianni Bongioanni	Christian Doermer, Werner Peters, Barbara Steele	Crime	Italian-West German-Spanish co-production
Time of the Innocent	Thomas Fantl	Wolfgang Kieling, Erik Schumann, Peter Pasetti, Hans Reiser, Karl-Otto Alberty, Heinz-Leo Fischer	Drama	Entered into the 14th Berlin International Film Festival
Tonio Kröger	Rolf Thiele	Jean-Claude Brialy, Nadja Tiller, Gert Fröbe, Theo Lingen, Mathieu Carrière	Drama	Entered into the 14th Berlin International Film Festival
Traitor's Gate	Freddie Francis	Gary Raymond, Albert Lieven, Catherine Schell, Margot Trooger, Eddi Arent, Klaus Kinski	Crime	Based on Edgar Wallace; British-West German co-production
The Umbrellas of Cherbourg	Jacques Demy	Catherine Deneuve, Nino Castelnuovo, Anne Vernon	Musical, Romance	French-West German co-production
The Visit	Bernhard Wicki	Ingrid Bergman, Anthony Quinn	Drama	West German-American-French-Italian co-production

== Documentaries and television films ==
Title	Director	Cast	Genre	Notes
1913	Hans Lietzau	Werner Hinz, Uta Sax, Gerd Baltus	Comedy	
Akte Wiltau	Ralph Lothar	Arnold Herff	War	
Aktion Brieftaube	Wolfgang Schleif	Thomas Danneberg, Anita Höfer	Docudrama	
Aktion T4	Max Peter Ammann	Wolfgang Büttner	War	
Andorra	Kurt Hirschfeld, Gert Westphal	Peter Brogle, Ernst Schröder, Heidemarie Hatheyer, Walter Richter, Willy Birgel	Drama	
The Apollo of Bellac	Ulrich Erfurth	Gerlinde Locker, Erich Schellow	Comedy	
Around the World in 80 Days	Hans Dieter Schwarze	Karl Schönböck, Heidelinde Weis, Manfred Lichtenfeld, Karl Lieffen	Comedy	a.k.a. Die Reise um die Erde
Asmodée	Wilm ten Haaf	Helmut Förnbacher, Barbara Frey, Dagmar Altrichter, Hellmut Lange, Ruth Maria Kubitschek	Drama	
The Aspern Papers	Rudolph Cartier	Albert Lieven, Käthe Gold, Adrienne Gessner	Drama	a.k.a. Briefe eines toten Dichters
Auftritt Frank Wedekind	Kurt Wilhelm	Werner Pochath, Gerlinde Locker, Karl Paryla, Ruth Maria Kubitschek, Gerd Baltus	Biography	
Awake and Sing!	Theodor Grädler	Inge Meysel, Katinka Hoffmann, Horst Naumann, Michael Verhoeven	Drama	a.k.a. Wachet und singet
Die Baßgeige	Wolfgang Liebeneiner	Wolfgang Anheisser, Ruth Gassmann, Benno Kusche	Opera	a.k.a. Die Bassgeige
The Beautiful Adventure	Wolfgang Schleif	Marlene Warrlich, Helmuth Schneider	Comedy	a.k.a. Fahrt ins Blaue
Beobachtung eines alten Mannes	Sam Besekow	Robert Lossen	Drama	
Bericht von den Inseln	Kurt Wilhelm	Hannes Messemer, Wolfgang Kieling, Elfriede Kuzmany	Drama	
Bezaubernde Mama	Rudolf Jugert	Susi Nicoletti, Ruth Maria Kubitschek, Almut Eggert	Comedy	
Das Bild des Menschen	Wilhelm Semmelroth	Bernhard Minetti, Hans Caninenberg, Wolfgang Büttner, Horst Niendorf, Joachim Ansorge	Drama	a.k.a. Das Bild des Menschen – Gespräche einer letzten Nacht
Bunbury	Harry Meyen	Harald Juhnke, Harry Meyen, Gerlinde Locker, Hubert von Meyerinck	Comedy	a.k.a. The Importance of Being Earnest
Bürger Schippel	Hans Dieter Schwarze	Klaus Schwarzkopf	Comedy	a.k.a. Schippel, the Plumber
Caesar and Cleopatra	Hans Dieter Schwarze	Uta Sax, Paul Verhoeven, Christoph Bantzer, Elisabeth Flickenschildt, Claus Biederstaedt	Drama	
Candida	Hans Schweikart	Margot Trooger, Hans Caninenberg, Christoph Bantzer	Comedy	
Casanova wider Willen	Max Nosseck	Georg Thomalla, Hannelore Elsner, Alexander D'Arcy, Friedrich Schoenfelder	Comedy	
The Cocktail Party	Ulrich Lauterbach	Hans Caninenberg, Erik Schumann, Luitgard Im, Margot Trooger, Robert Meyn, Uwe Friedrichsen	Drama	
The Coffee Shop	Hermann Leitner	Christian Wolff, Monika Peitsch, Hans Putz, Hans Clarin	Comedy	a.k.a. The Coffee House
Corinth House	Rudolph Cartier	Ingrid Andree, Dorothea Neff, Ljuba Welitsch, Elisabeth Markus, Albert Lieven	Thriller	a.k.a. Das Haus der Vergeltung. Austrian-West German co-production
Criminals	Michael Kehlmann	Klausjürgen Wussow, Ida Krottendorf, Hans Clarin, Ingeborg Schöner, Hans Putz, Christian Doermer, Rosl Schäfer	Drama	a.k.a. Die Verbrecher
Dann geh zu Thorp	Hans Lietzau	Brigitte Horney, Rolf Boysen	Drama	
Dear Barbarians	Hagen Mueller-Stahl	Helmuth Lohner, Brigitte Grothum	Comedy	
The Desperate Hours	Ludwig Cremer	Hanns Lothar, Hans Caninenberg	Thriller	a.k.a. Stunden der Angst
Die deutschen Kleinstädter	Dietrich Haugk	Sabine Sinjen, Hans Clarin, Peter Arens, Alfred Balthoff	Comedy	a.k.a. Unsere deutschen Kleinstädter
Doddy und die Musketiere	Arthur Maria Rabenalt	Loni von Friedl, Adrian Hoven, Gerhard Riedmann, Stanislav Ledinek, Heinz Erhardt, Werner Finck	Musical comedy, Fantasy	a.k.a. Doddy und die Musketiere – Ein Märchen mit Musik
The Dog in the Manger	Fritz Umgelter	Agnes Fink, Martin Benrath, Chariklia Baxevanos	Comedy	a.k.a. Bei Tag und Nacht
Der Doktor	Rudolf Schündler	Günter Pfitzmann, Monika Peitsch, Ilse Pagé	Drama	
The Duel	Hans Schweikart	Hartmut Reck, Pinkas Braun, Gerlinde Locker, Stanislav Ledinek, Uwe Friedrichsen	Drama	
Electra	Oswald Döpke	Luitgard Im, Fritz Wepper, Heidemarie Hatheyer, Richard Häussler, Horst Tappert, Viktor de Kowa	Drama	a.k.a. Elektra
Eurydice	Ludwig Cremer	Heidelinde Weis, Christoph Bantzer, Robert Graf, Gisela Uhlen, Fritz Rasp	Drama	
Der Fall Jakubowski	Robert A. Stemmle	Friedrich G. Beckhaus, Hans W. Hamacher, Claus Holm	Crime, Docudrama	a.k.a. Der Fall Jakubowski – Rekonstruktion eines Justizirrtums
Der Feigling und die Tänzerin	Peter Beauvais	Sabine Sinjen, Hans-Joachim Schmiedel	Comedy	
The First Legion	Harry Buckwitz	Heinz Drache, Wolfgang Preiss, Wolfgang Büttner, Christian Doermer, Heinz Bennent, Wolfgang Völz	Drama	
Flug in Gefahr	Theo Mezger	Hanns Lothar, Ingmar Zeisberg, Benno Sterzenbach	Drama	a.k.a. Flight into Danger
Der Fluggast	Werner Schlechte	Walter Bluhm, Margot Philipp, Helmut Förnbacher	Drama	a.k.a. Collect Your Hand Baggage
Frau Luna	Thomas Engel	Margit Schramm, Gunnar Möller, Heinz Erhardt, Brigitte Mira, Willi Rose, Hubert von Meyerinck	Musical comedy	
Friday in Wilhelmsburg	Egon Monk	Edgar Bessen, Ingeborg Hartmann	Drama	
Game in the Sand	Werner Herzog		Short	
Die Gardine	Rainer Erler	Louise Martini, Robert Meyn, Wolfgang Wahl, Herbert Stass	Comedy	
The Gazebo	Wilm ten Haaf	Horst Tappert, Konrad Georg	Black comedy	a.k.a. Der Aussichtsturm
Der Gefangene der Botschaft	Nicolas Gessner	Mathias Wieman, Willy Birgel, Wolfgang Reichmann	Drama	Swiss-West German co-production
Geheimbund Nächstenliebe	Ralph Lothar	Herbert Schimkat, Irene Haller	Drama	
General Frederic	Dietrich Haugk	Peter Arens, Lucie Mannheim, Hannelore Elsner	Comedy	
Georges Dandin	Dietrich Haugk	Wolfgang Reichmann, Grit Boettcher	Comedy	
Gerechtigkeit in Worowogorsk	Dietrich Haugk	Lucie Mannheim, Georg Thomalla, Walter Kohut, Vera Tschechowa, Herbert Fleischmann, Benno Sterzenbach	Comedy	
Die Geschichte von Joel Brand	Franz Peter Wirth	Emil Stöhr, Herwig Walter	Drama, War	
Das Gespenst von Canterville	Helmut Käutner	Barry McDaniel, Lisa Otto, Benno Hoffmann, Loren Driscoll, Maria von Ilosvay	Opera	a.k.a. The Canterville Ghost
Glück zu kleinen Preisen	Ralph Lothar	Wolfgang Zilzer, Hanne Wieder, Gerhard Riedmann	Musical	
Haben	Rolf Hädrich	Therese Giehse, Ingmar Zeisberg, Hanne Hiob, Tilla Durieux	Drama	a.k.a. Tiszazug
Harlequinade	Erich Neureuther	Marianne Hoppe, Axel von Ambesser	Comedy	
Heartbreak House	Detlof Krüger	Rudolf Forster, Gisela Trowe, Renate Schroeter, Paul Edwin Roth	Comedy	a.k.a. Haus Herzenstod
Herrn Walsers Raben	Dieter Lemmel	Heinz Reincke, Lucie Mannheim, Hilde Hildebrand, Karl John	Black comedy, Fantasy	
The High School	Wilhelm Semmelroth	Ida Ehre, Martin Berliner, Marius Müller-Westernhagen	Comedy	a.k.a. Die höhere Schule
His and Hers	Franz Josef Wild	Ruth Maria Kubitschek, Gerhard Riedmann	Comedy	a.k.a. Mein oder Dein
Hofloge	John Olden	Harald Leipnitz, Christiane Hörbiger, Wolfgang Reichmann, Agnes Windeck	Musical	
Hotel Iphigenie	Johannes Schaaf	Hans Putz, Astrid Frank, Trude Hesterberg, Hilde Körber, Tilli Breidenbach, Günther Jerschke	Drama	
Der Hund des Generals	Franz Peter Wirth	Paul Hoffmann, Robert Graf, Willy Semmelrogge	War, Drama	
Ich fahre Patschold	Peter Beauvais	Uwe Friedrichsen, Walter Jokisch, Wera Frydtberg, Werner Bruhns, Helga Feddersen	Comedy	
Im Tingeltangel tut sich was	Helmut Weiss	Christiane Maybach, Brigitte Mira, Stanislav Ledinek, Liane Croon, Grethe Weiser	Musical comedy, Anthology	
In einem Garten in Aviamo	John Olden	Paul Danquah, Kathleen Breck, Leonard Steckel, Günther Neutze	Drama	
In the Matter of J. Robert Oppenheimer	Gerhard Klingenberg	Charles Régnier, Carl Lange, Alexander Kerst, Siegfried Wischnewski	Drama	
Jenny und der Herr im Frack	Paul Martin	Brigitte Grothum, Grethe Weiser, Fritz Tillmann, Claus Holm	Crime comedy	
The Just Assassins	Rolf Hädrich	Christoph Bantzer, Hans Helmut Dickow, Herbert Stass, Anneli Granget, Paul Verhoeven	Drama	a.k.a. Die Gerechten
Der Kaiser vom Alexanderplatz	Erik Ode	Rudolf Platte, Anita Kupsch, Berta Drews	Comedy, War	
Kammerjungfer	Hans Quest	Chariklia Baxevanos, Eckart Dux, Fritz Tillmann, Alice Treff, Ingeborg Schöner	Comedy	a.k.a. Behold the Bride a.k.a. Soubrette
Karl Sand	Franz Peter Wirth	Gerd Baltus, Karl Michael Vogler, Ernst Jacobi	Drama	
Katharina Knie	Theodor Grädler	Christiane Hörbiger, Attila Hörbiger, Alexander Kerst, Lina Carstens	Drama	
Der König mit dem Regenschirm	Imo Moszkowicz	Eckart Dux, Georg Thomalla, Loni von Friedl, Luigi Malipiero	Musical	
Ein langer Tag	Lothar Kompatzki	Paul Dahlke, Lis Verhoeven, Edith Schultze-Westrum	Crime	
Late Summer Affair	Peter Beauvais	Karin Baal, Erik Ode	Drama	
Léocadia	Harald Benesch	Vera Tschechowa, Walter Riss, Hilde Wagener	Comedy	a.k.a. Time Remembered
Liebeshändel in Chioggia	Wolfgang Liebeneiner	Toni Sailer, Anneli Sauli, Paul Esser	Comedy	a.k.a. Le baruffe chiozzotte
The Lover	Peter Schulze-Rohr	Hannelore Schroth, Günther Ungeheuer	Drama	a.k.a. Der Liebhaber
Lydia muss sterben	Rainer Erler	Eva Pflug, Hellmut Lange, Klaus Löwitsch	Crime	a.k.a. False Bounty
The Maids	Thomas Engel	Inge Langen, Gisela Trowe, Edda Seippel	Drama	a.k.a. Die Zofen
Ein Mann ist soeben erschossen worden	Edward Rothe	Gerlinde Locker, Walter Richter, Peter Pasetti	Thriller	
Der Mann mit dem Zylinder	Eberhard Itzenplitz	Horst Tappert, Eva Pflug, Harald Leipnitz, Marlene Warrlich, Alfred Balthoff	Musical	
Marie-Octobre	Imo Moszkowicz	Agnes Fink, Hans Christian Blech, Wolfgang Preiss, Martin Benrath, Herbert Fleischmann	Drama, Mystery	
The Martyrdom of Peter Ohey	Peter Lilienthal	Joachim Wichmann, Angelika Hurwicz, Heinz Meier, Günter Meisner	Black comedy	a.k.a. Das Martyrium des Peter O'Hey
Measure for Measure	Paul Verhoeven	Heidelinde Weis, Hans Caninenberg, Lothar Blumhagen, Karola Ebeling, Erik Schumann	Comedy	a.k.a. Zweierlei Maß
Minna von Barnhelm	Ludwig Cremer	Johanna von Koczian, Johanna Matz, Martin Benrath, Theo Lingen	Comedy	
Monsieur Lamberthier	Erik Ode	Dietmar Schönherr, Gisela Peltzer	Thriller	
Murke's Collected Silences	Rolf Hädrich	Dieter Hildebrandt, Heinz Schubert, Robert Meyn, Dieter Borsche	Comedy	a.k.a. Doktor Murkes gesammeltes Schweigen
My Niece Susanne	Thomas Engel	Hannelore Schroth, Karl Schönböck, Peer Schmidt, Rudolf Vogel	Musical	
Nach Ladenschluss	Rolf Hädrich	Renate Schroeter, Dietmar Schönherr, Matthias Fuchs	Drama	
Nachtzug D 106	Helmut Ashley	Martin Benrath, Anaid Iplicjian, Walter Rilla, Margarete Haagen, Barbara Frey, Klaus Schwarzkopf	Drama	a.k.a. Night Train
Napoleon greift ein	Frank Lothar	Wolfgang Wahl, Mady Rahl, Peter Capell, Claus Holm	Comedy, Fantasy	a.k.a. Her Man of Wax
Nebeneinander	Harald Benesch	Carl Wery, Hanne Hiob, Regine Lutz, Bert Fortell	Drama	
The Noose	Rolf Hädrich	Harald Leipnitz, Ingmar Zeisberg	Drama	a.k.a. Die Schlinge
Das ozeanische Fest	Ottokar Runze	Brigitte Grothum, Alfred Balthoff, Benno Hoffmann	Comedy	
Pamela	Falk Harnack	Veronika Bayer, Christoph Bantzer, Lucie Mannheim, Gustav Fröhlich	Comedy	
The Physicists	Fritz Umgelter	Therese Giehse, Gustav Knuth, Wolfgang Kieling, Siegfried Lowitz	Drama	
The Ponder Heart	Wolfgang Spier	Rudolf Platte, Hannelore Elsner, Harry Wüstenhagen, Otto Waldis, Robert Owens	Drama	a.k.a. Angeklagter: Onkel Daniel
Present Laughter	Rolf von Sydow	Albert Lieven, Dagmar Altrichter, Monika Peitsch, Wolfgang Völz	Comedy	a.k.a. Amouren
Professor Bernhardi	Peter Beauvais	Karl Paryla	Drama	
Der Prozeß Carl von O.	John Olden	Rolf Henniger, Charles Régnier, Carl Lange, Siegfried Wischnewski	Docudrama	a.k.a. Der Prozess Carl von Ossietzky a.k.a. The Weltbühne Trial
The Rabbit Race	Rainer Wolffhardt	Horst Bollmann, Ruth Drexel, Paul Dahlke, Herbert Fleischmann	Drama, War	a.k.a. Eiche und Angora
Refugee Conversations	Harry Buckwitz	Curt Bois, Karl Paryla	Drama	
Die reinsten Engel	Walter Rilla	Antje Weisgerber, Edith Schultze-Westrum	Drama	a.k.a. My Lost Saints
Romeo and Juliet	Gerhard Klingenberg	Brigitte Grothum, Jörg Holm, Günter Mack, Michael Degen	Drama	
Die Sanfte	Willi Schmidt	Peter Mosbacher, Carin Braun	Drama	a.k.a. A Gentle Creature a.k.a. The Meek One
Sechs Stunden Angst	Eugen York	Paul Dahlke, Hans Söhnker, Alexander Kerst, Wera Frydtberg, Wolfgang Völz, Christiane Schmidtmer	Thriller	a.k.a. 6 Stunden Angst
Der Seitensprung	Rainer Erler	Robert Meyn, Hannelore Elsner	Drama	
Sergeant Dower muß sterben	Michael Kehlmann	Klausjürgen Wussow	Drama	a.k.a. Shout for Life a.k.a. Sergeant Dower muss sterben
Sicher ist sicher	Kurt Wilhelm	Charles Régnier, Robert Graf	Crime comedy	
Sie werden sterben, Sire	Imo Moszkowicz	Paul Dahlke, Alexander Kerst, Klaus Schwarzkopf, Herbert Fleischmann	Drama	
Die sieben Todsünden der Kleinbürger	Kurt Wilhelm	Gisela May, Tilly Söffing	Musical	a.k.a. Die 7 Todsünden der Kleinbürger a.k.a. The Seven Deadly Sins
The Silver Whistle	Theo Mezger	Leonard Steckel	Comedy	a.k.a. Die Silberflöte
Six Characters in Search of an Author	Eberhard Itzenplitz	Horst Tappert, Robert Freitag, Elfriede Irrall, Helmut Förnbacher, Ruth Hausmeister, Marius Müller-Westernhagen	Comedy	
The Sky Is Blue	Wolfgang Schleif	Karin Baal, Toni Sailer, Zarah Leander	Musical comedy	a.k.a. Das Blaue vom Himmel
Ein Sommer – ein Herbst	Tom Toelle	Renate Danz, Hartmut Reck, Werner Bruhns, Hans Helmut Dickow, Ivan Rebroff	Drama	a.k.a. The Grasshopper
The Straw	Gerhard Klingenberg	Brigitte Grothum, Klausjürgen Wussow	Drama	
Tageszeiten der Liebe	Werner Steinadler	Heinz Bennent, Gerlinde Locker	Drama	a.k.a. Dawn, Day, and Night
Tartuffe	Ulrich Lauterbach	Karl Paryla, Annemarie Düringer, Christoph Bantzer	Comedy	
Die Teufelsspur	Fritz Umgelter	Wolfgang Kieling	Black comedy	
That Lady	Rudolph Cartier	Wanda Rotha, Albert Lieven, Alexander Kerst, Edith Schultze-Westrum	Drama	a.k.a. Legende einer Liebe
Thieves' Carnival	Hans Wolff	Grethe Weiser, Christian Wolff, Corny Collins, Rudolf Rhomberg, Eckart Dux, Alexander Engel	Comedy	a.k.a. Ball der Diebe
Thomas More	Gerhard Klingenberg	Kurt Meisel, Hans Quest	Drama	a.k.a. A Man for All Seasons
Three Sisters	Peter Beauvais	Johanna von Koczian, Carl Lange, Hartmut Reck, Lukas Ammann	Drama	a.k.a. Drei Schwestern
The Time of Your Life	Imo Moszkowicz	Martin Benrath, Karl-Otto Alberty, Krista Keller, Heinz-Leo Fischer, Otto Waldis, Rolf Boysen, Hans Helmut Dickow, Claus Wilcke, Gisela Uhlen	Comedy	a.k.a. Ein Leben lang
Tom und seine Söhne	Fritz Umgelter	Alfred Schieske, Rolf Boysen, Harald Dietl, Mady Rahl, Renate Schroeter	Drama	a.k.a. The Country Boy
Tote ohne Begräbnis	Rainer Wolffhardt	Herbert Fleischmann, Gerd Baltus, Matthias Fuchs, Werner Schumacher, Martha Wallner, Herbert Stass	War	a.k.a. Men Without Shadows a.k.a. The Victors
The Train for Venice	Elisabeth Kern	Grit Boettcher, Herbert Stass, Ernst Stankovski	Comedy	a.k.a. Schnellzug nach Venedig
Der Traum des Eroberers	Fritz Umgelter	Rolf Boysen, Robert Meyn, Wolfgang Kieling, Rolf Becker, Wolfgang Büttner, Heinz Weiss, Hellmut Lange, Alexander Kerst, Carl Wery, Edith Mill	Drama	a.k.a. William the Conqueror
The Trojan War Will Not Take Place	Franz Josef Wild	Hannes Messemer, Rolf Boysen, Ruth Maria Kubitschek, Horst Tappert, Gertrud Kückelmann, Lucie Mannheim	Drama	a.k.a. Tiger at the Gates
The Two Gentlemen of Verona	Hans Dieter Schwarze	Heidelinde Weis, Rolf Becker	Comedy	
Die Übungspatrone	Hanns Korngiebel	Herbert Stass, Wolfgang Spier, Peter Schiff, Gert Haucke, Ernst Jacobi, Ulli Kinalzik, Friedrich G. Beckhaus, Reinhard Kolldehoff	War	
Under the Pear Tree	Mark Lawton	Paul Esser, Agnes Fink	Crime drama	a.k.a. Unterm Birnbaum
Der Weiberheld	Hermann Leitner	Karl Schönböck, Grit Boettcher, Hans Putz, Stanislav Ledinek	Comedy	a.k.a. Miles Gloriosus
White Nights	Wilhelm Semmelroth	Kornelia Boje, Hartmut Reck	Drama	a.k.a. Helle Nächte
Die Wohnung	Harald Benesch	Maria Emo, Lotte Lang, Karl Hellmer	Drama	
Wolves and Sheep	Detlof Krüger	Ida Ehre, Anaid Iplicjian	Comedy	
Zeitvertreib	Rainer Wolffhardt	Peer Schmidt, Anneli Granget	Drama	
Zwei Tage von vielen	Ralph Lothar	Viktoria Naelin	War	a.k.a. 2 Tage von vielen
Die Zwiebel	Günter Gräwert	Robert Graf, Maria Sebaldt	Comedy	

== See also ==
- List of Austrian films of 1964
- List of East German films of 1964

== Bibliography ==
- Bergfelder, Tim. International Adventures: German Popular Cinema and European Co-Productions in the 1960s. Berghahn Books, 2005.
- Curti, Roberto (2019). Devil's Advocates: Blood and Black Lace. Auteur Publishing. ISBN 978-1-911325-93-2.
