= Ingeborg (film) =

1960 West German comedy film

- Directed by: Wolfgang Liebeneiner
- Written by: Willibald Eser; Curt Goetz (play); Karin Jacobsen
- Produced by: Fritz Anton; Johannes J. Frank; Willy Schöne; Luggi Waldleitner
- Starring: Ingrid Ernest; Dietmar Schönherr; Walter Giller
- Cinematography: Günther Senftleben
- Edited by: Lilian Seng; Ursula Zschiesche
- Music by: Peter Thomas
- Production company: Roxy Film
- Distributed by: UFA
- Release date: 6 October 1960
- Running time: 88 minutes
- Country: West Germany
- Language: German

Ingeborg is a 1960 West German comedy film directed by Wolfgang Liebeneiner and starring Ingrid Ernest, Dietmar Schönherr and Walter Giller. The film's sets were designed by the art directors Wolf Englert and Ernst Richter.

== Cast ==
- Ingrid Ernest as Ingeborg
- Dietmar Schönherr as Peter
- Walter Giller as Ottokar
- Fita Benkhoff as Tante Ottilie
- Rudolf Vogel as Herr Konjunktiv

== Bibliography ==
- Elsaesser, Thomas; Wedel, Michael, eds. (1999). The BFI companion to German cinema. London: British Film Institute. ISBN 978-0-85170-750-1.
