= Günther Senftleben =

German cinematographer

- Born: 4 March 1925; Büdingen, Hesse, Germany
- Died: 12 October 1982 (aged 57); Vaterstetten, Bavaria, West Germany
- Occupation: Cinematographer
- Years active: 1953-1979 (film & TV)

Günther Senftleben (1925–1982) was a German cinematographer.

== Selected filmography ==
- Request Concert (1955)
- A Piece of Heaven (1957)
- Peter Voss, Thief of Millions (1958)
- People in the Net (1959)
- Rendezvous in Vienna (1959)
- Adorable Arabella (1959)
- Jacqueline (1959)
- Brainwashed (1960)
- Ingeborg (1960)
- The Woman by the Dark Window (1960)
- Agatha, Stop That Murdering! (1960)
- Question 7 (1961)
- The Dream of Lieschen Mueller (1961)
- Captain Sindbad (1963)
- Don't Tell Me Any Stories (1964)
- Maya (1966)

== Bibliography ==
- Esther Pia Wipfler. Martin Luther in Motion Pictures: History of a Metamorphosis. Vandenhoeck & Ruprecht, 2011.
