= Ernst Fritz Fürbringer =

German actor

- Born: 27 July 1900; Brunswick, Duchy of Brunswick, German Empire
- Died: 30 October 1988 (aged 88); Munich, Bavaria, West Germany
- Occupation: Actor
- Years active: 1933–1983

Ernst Fritz Fürbringer (27 July 1900 – 30 October 1988) was a German film actor. He appeared in 130 films between 1933 and 1983. He was born in Brunswick, Germany and died in Munich, Germany.

== Selected filmography ==
- Die große und die kleine Welt (1936)
- Street Music (1936) - Geschäftsführer im Café 'Dorado'
- Dinner Is Served (1936) - Charles
- Du bist mein Glück (1936)
- Truxa (1937) - Garvin
- An Enemy of the People (1937) - Ministerialrat
- The Stars Shine (1938) - Hans Holger
- Dreizehn Mann und eine Kanone (1938)
- Water for Canitoga (1939) - Sheriff von Canitoga
- Fasching (1939) - Direktor Peter Wendland
- Der singende Tor (1939) - Defense lawyer
- Casa lontana (1939) - Lorenzo Perelli
- The Fire Devil (1940) - Prince von Metternich
- The Girl from Barnhelm (1940) - Von Schornow
- Carl Peters (1941) - Count Wehr-Bandelin
- Venus on Trial (1941) - Paul Dreysing, Zeichner
- Comrades (1941) - Count Saint Marsan
- Alarmstufe V (1941) - Director Gentzmer
- Vienna Blood (1942) - Metternich
- Die heimlichen Bräute (1942)
- Andreas Schlüter (1942) - Baron Eosander
- The Endless Road (1943) - General Andrew Jackson
- Die unheimliche Wandlung des Axel Roscher (1943) - Eveillard
- Titanic (1943) - Sir Bruce Ismay
- I Need You (1944) - Dr. Max Hoffmann
- Ein Blick zurück (1944) - Professor Ammerfors
- Ich bitte um Vollmacht (1944) - Lawyer Dr. Norbert Hartwig
- Der Fall Molander (1945)
- Geld ins Haus (1947) - Rienösl, Advokat
- Ghost in the Castle (1947) - Alexander Graf
- Der Herr vom andern Stern (1948) - Doctor
- The Trip to Marrakesh (1949) - Jean
- Der große Fall (1949) - Ein undurchsichtiger Herr
- Crown Jewels (1950)
- Border Post 58 (1951) - Grenzpolizeiinspektor Hirzinger
- The Lady in Black (1951) - Banker Petterson
- The Blue Star of the South (1951) - Niccolini
- Captive Soul (1952)
- Two People (1952) - Monsignore
- The Blue and White Lion (1952) - Vorsitzender des Gerichts
- Captain Bay-Bay (1953) - Präfekt
- The Chaplain of San Lorenzo (1953) - Prosecutor
- A Heart Plays False (1953)
- Jackboot Mutiny (1955) - Erwin von Witzleben
- Heiße Ernte (1956) - Hubert Scharfenberg
- King in Shadow (1957) - (uncredited)
- The Girl and the Legend (1957) - Lord Horace
- The Devil Strikes at Night (1957) - Justice Dr. Schleffien
- The Crammer (1958) - School inspector Wagner
- Resurrection (1958) - Oberst
- Der Frosch mit der Maske (1959) - Sir Archibald
- The Man Who Walked Through the Wall (1959) - Arzt
- Mrs. Warren's Profession (1960) - Praed
- The Crimson Circle (1960) - Sir Archibald Morton
- The Terrible People (1960) - Sir Archibald
- You Must Be Blonde on Capri (1961) - von Straaten
- The Puzzle of the Red Orchid (1962) - Sir John (uncredited)
- Tim Frazer (1963, TV miniseries) - Donald Edwards
- 12 Angry Men (1963, TV film) - Juror 4
- Zwei Whisky und ein Sofa (1963) - Hartmann
- A Mission for Mr. Dodd (1964) - Sir Gerald Blythe
- Dead Woman from Beverly Hills (1964) - Professor Sostlov
- The Curse of the Hidden Vault (1964) - Connor
- Tales of a Young Scamp (1964) - School Director
- Tante Frieda – Neue Lausbubengeschichten (1965) - School Director (uncredited)
- Kommissar X – In den Klauen des goldenen Drachen (1966) - Professor Akron
- Is Paris Burning? (1966) - General von Boineburg
- Der Tod läuft hinterher (1967, TV miniseries) - Police Inspector Brown
- Der Monat der fallenden Blätter (1968, TV film) - Prof. Harold Hilliard
- Hannibal Brooks (1969) - Elephant Keeper Kellerman
- The Animals' Conference (1969) - The Elephant (voice)
- Ludwig auf Freiersfüßen (1969) - Schuldirektor
- Father Brown (1970-1972, TV series) - Inspector Gilbert Burns
- Tiger Gang (1971) - Prof. Tavaria / Frank Stefani
- Sie liebten sich einen Sommer (1972) - Professor Schott
- Night Flight from Moscow (1973) - Pastor (uncredited)
- Sperrmüll (1976, TV film) - Johannes Gander
- Bei Westwind hört man keinen Schuß (1976, TV film) - Dr. Schlünz
- Wallenstein (1978, TV miniseries) - Field Marshall Tilly
- Vom Webstuhl zur Weltmacht (1983, TV series) - Emperor Frederick III
- Derrick (1983, Episode 4: "Der Täter schickte Blumen") - Herr Baruda
- Vor dem Sturm (1984, TV miniseries) - Prince Ferdinand
- Der Sonne entgegen (1985, TV series) - Professor Lembach
- Derrick (1985, Episode 6: "Das tödliche Schweigen") - Stargard
- The Black Forest Clinic (1986-1987, TV Series) - Konstantin Taubricht
