= Willy Schatz =

German art director (1903–1976)

- Born: 9 July 1903; St. Petersburg, Russian Empire
- Died: 14 March 1976 (aged 72); Salzburg, Austria
- Occupation: Art director
- Years active: 1950-1972 (film)

Willy Schatz (1903–1976) was a German art director of Baltic German origin. He designed the set for The Indian Tomb in 1959.

== Selected filmography ==
- Two Times Lotte (1950)
- Love on Ice (1950)
- Das Riesenrad (1951)
- The White Horse Inn (1952)
- The Immortal Vagabond (1953)
- The Postponed Wedding Night (1953)
- Cabaret (1954)
- Marianne of My Youth (1955)
- The Mistress of Solderhof (1955)
- Love, Summer and Music (1956)
- The Doctor of Stalingrad (1958)
- The Domestic Tyrant (1959)
- Everybody Loves Peter (1959)
- The Tiger of Eschnapur (1959)
- The Indian Tomb (1959)
- The Haunted Castle (1960)
- Axel Munthe, The Doctor of San Michele (1962)
- A Mission for Mr. Dodd (1964)
- Living It Up (1966)
- The Liar and the Nun (1967)

== Bibliography ==
- Langford, Michelle. Directory of World Cinema: Germany. Intellect Books, 2012.
