= Bruno Monden =

German art director

- Born: 6 April 1900; Berlin, German Empire
- Died: 5 July 1980 (aged 80); Munich, Bavaria, West Germany
- Occupation: Art director
- Years active: 1937-1970 (film)

Bruno Monden (1900–1980) was a German art director. He designed the sets for several rubble films in the wake of the Second World War.

== Selected filmography ==
- The Stars Shine (1938)
- The Murderers Are Among Us (1946)
- Wozzeck (1947)
- Raid (1947)
- Morituri (1958)
- Royal Children (1950)
- King for One Night (1950)
- Heart's Desire (1951)
- Cuba Cabana (1952)
- The Blue and White Lion (1952)
- No Greater Love (1952)
- Street Serenade (1953)
- A Woman of Today (1954)
- André and Ursula (1955)
- San Salvatore (1956)
- A Piece of Heaven (1957)
- Restless Night (1958)
- The Green Devils of Monte Cassino (1958)
- At Blonde Kathrein's Place (1959)
- The Head (1959)
- Conny and Peter Make Music (1960)
- Agatha, Stop That Murdering! (1960)
- The Last of Mrs. Cheyney (1961)
- Don't Tell Me Any Stories (1964)
- When Ludwig Goes on Manoeuvres (1967)

== Bibliography ==
- Shandley, Robert R. Rubble Films: German Cinema in the Shadow of the Third Reich. Temple University Press, 2001.
