= The Liar and the Nun =

1967 film

- Directed by: Rolf Thiele
- Written by: Josef Czech
- Based on: The Liar and the Nun by Curt Goetz
- Produced by: Otto Dürer
- Starring: Curd Jürgens; Robert Hoffmann; Heidelinde Weis
- Cinematography: Wolf Wirth
- Edited by: Liselotte Klimitscheck
- Music by: Karl de Groof
- Production company: Vienna Film
- Distributed by: Constantin Film
- Release date: 10 November 1967
- Running time: 99 minutes
- Country: Austria
- Language: German

The Liar and the Nun (German: Der Lügner und die Nonne) is a 1967 Austrian comedy film directed by Rolf Thiele and starring Curd Jürgens, Robert Hoffmann and Heidelinde Weis. It was based on the 1928 play of the same title by Curt Goetz. The film's sets were designed by the art director Willy Schatz.

== Cast ==
- Curd Jürgens as The cardinal
- Robert Hoffmann as Charly, a liar
- Heidelinde Weis as Angela, a nun
- Elisabeth Flickenschildt as the Abbess
- Karl Schönböck as Petrops, the butler
- Jane Tilden as Mrs. von Schicketanz
- Rudolf Rhomberg as Father Accursius
- Joachim Wolff as Udo
- Harry Karl Ernst as A guest
- Ilse Künkele as Philomena
- Ingrid Simon as Saaltochter
- Helmuth Wallner as Bodo

== Bibliography ==
- Cowie, Peter. World Filmography: 1967. Fairleigh Dickinson Univ Press, 1977.
- Goble, Alan. The Complete Index to Literary Sources in Film. Walter de Gruyter, 1999.
- Von Dassanowsky, Robert. Austrian Cinema: A History. McFarland, 2005.
