= When Ludwig Goes on Manoeuvres =

1967 film

- German film poster
- German: Wenn Ludwig ins Manöver zieht
- Directed by: Werner Jacobs
- Screenplay by: Georg Laforet; Ludwig Thoma
- Produced by: Franz Seitz
- Starring: Hansi Kraus; Heidelinde Weis; Rudolf Rhomberg; Elisabeth Flickenschildt
- Cinematography: Wolf Wirth
- Edited by: Jane Sperr
- Music by: Rolf Alexander Wilhelm
- Production company: Franz Seitz Filmproduktion
- Distributed by: Constantin Film
- Release date: 19 December 1967
- Running time: 91 minutes
- Country: West Germany
- Language: German

When Ludwig Goes on Manoeuvres (German: Wenn Ludwig ins Manöver zieht) is a 1967 West German historical comedy film directed by Werner Jacobs, starring Hansi Kraus as Ludwig Thoma, Heidelinde Weis and Rudolf Rhomberg. The script was provided by producer Franz Seitz who chose his pen name "Georg Laforet" for the credits. Besides many well-known actors of the day, the film also features Zlatko Čajkovski, 1967's trainer of FC Bayern Munich, his goal-getter Gerd Müller and his goalkeeper Sepp Maier.

The film's sets were designed by the art directors Wolf Englert and Bruno Monden. It was shot in Eastmancolor.

== Plot ==
The Prussian Army comes to Bavaria for a military exercise. They show off and try to demonstrate superiority. Yet they don't stand a chance because they are not prepared for Ludwig's nifty pranks.

== Cast ==
- Hansi Kraus as Ludwig Thoma
- Heidelinde Weis as Cora Reiser
- Elisabeth Flickenschildt as Aunt Frieda
- Rudolf Rhomberg as Pfarrer "Kindlein" Falkenberg / Feldwebel Falkenberg
- Hubert von Meyerinck as Oberst von Below
- Chantal Goya as Melanie
- Hans Terofal as Bader Gschwind
- Georg Thomalla as Hauptmann Stumpf
- Karl Schönböck as Corpsgeneral
- Hans Quest as Rittmeister von Stülphagel
- Dieter Borsche as Wilhelm II
- Beppo Brem as Rafenauer
- Friedrich von Thun as Franz Reiser
- Claus Wilcke as Oberleutnant von Busch
- Evelyn Gressmann as princess
- Veronika Fitz as waitress Fanny
- Sepp Rist as Oberst von der Tann
- Zlatko Čajkovski as company's cook Čajkovski
- Sepp Maier as Sepp Maier
- Gerd Müller as Müller
