= Kvasice =

- Municipality
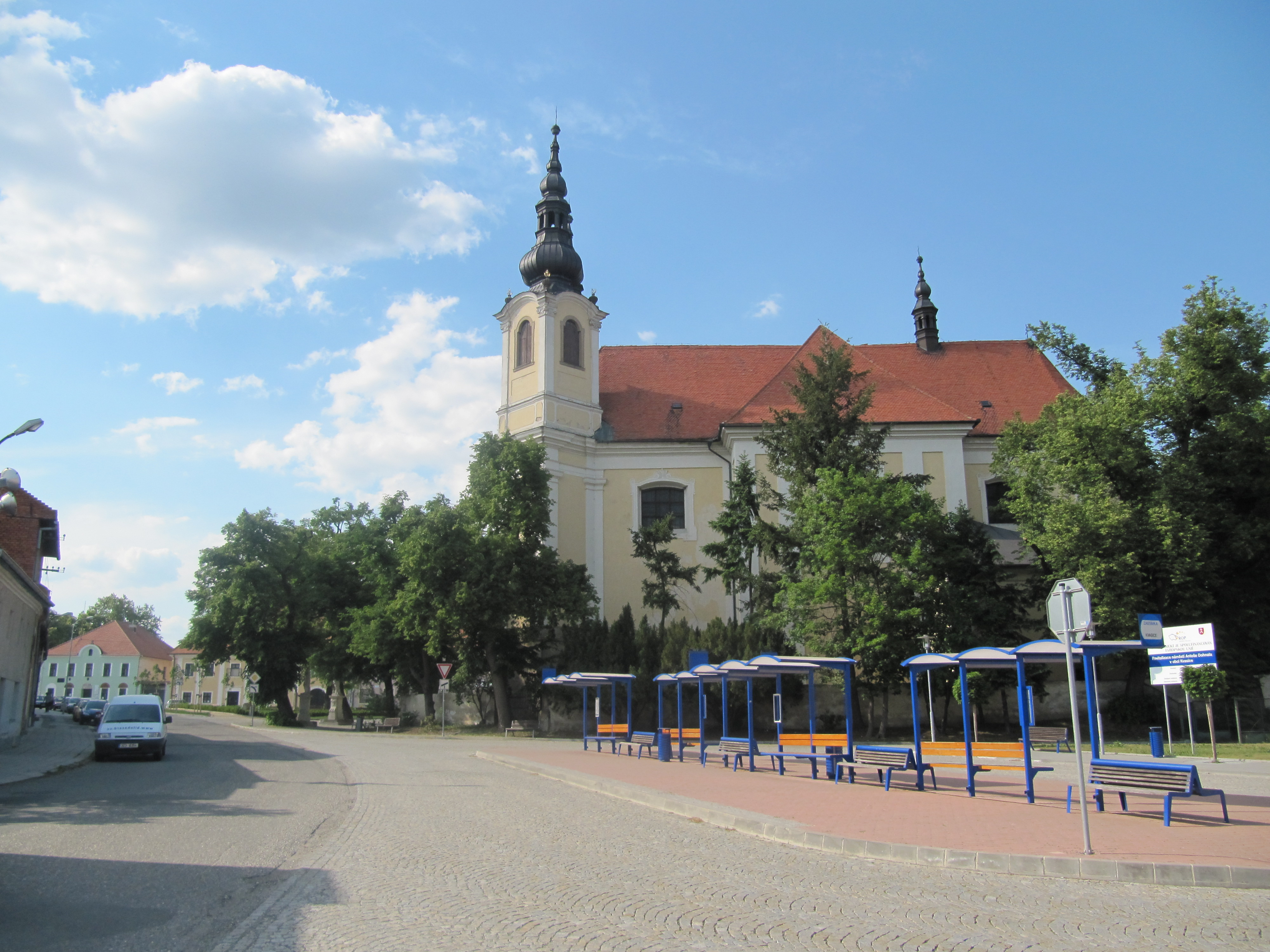
- Church of the Assumption of the Virgin Mary

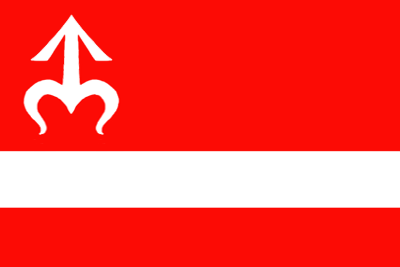
- Flag Coat of arms

- Location in the Czech Republic
- Coordinates: 49°14′32″N 17°28′11″E
- Country: Czech Republic
- Region: Zlín
- District: Kroměříž
- First mentioned: 1141

Area
  - Total: 11.05 km^{2} (4.27 sq mi)
- Elevation: 185 m (607 ft)

Population (2026-01-01)
  - Total: 2,196
  - Density: 198.7/km^{2} (514.7/sq mi)
- Time zone: UTC+1 (CET)
  - Summer (DST): UTC+2 (CEST)
- Postal code: 768 21
- Website: www.kvasice.cz

Kvasice (German: Kwassitz) is a municipality and village in Kroměříž District in the Zlín Region of the Czech Republic. It has about 2,200 inhabitants.

== Geography ==
Kvasice is located about 8 kilometres (5 mi) southeast of Kroměříž and 14 km (9 mi) west of Zlín. It lies on the border between the Upper Morava Valley and Chřiby range. The highest point is at 300 m (984 ft) above sea level. The Morava River flows through the municipality. In the northern part of the municipal territory is situated Štěrkovna Kvasice, an artificial lake created by flooding a gravel quarry.

== History ==
The first written mention of Kvasice is from 1141. Until 1423, it was mostly owned by the Lords of Benešov. From 1433 to the end of the 15th century, the village was a property of the Kužel family, but then the owners often changed. In 1636–1757, Kvasice was owned by the Rottal family. In 1757–1902, the estate was ruled by the Lamberk family. In 1902, Kvasice Castle was inherited by Jaroslav of Thun und Hohenstein. He was the brother-in-law of Archduke Franz Ferdinand of Austria, who used to go to Kvasice forests to hunt.

== Demographics ==
Historical population

Year	Pop.	±%
1869	1,584	—
1880	1,788	+12.9%
1890	1,818	+1.7%
1900	1,769	−2.7%
1910	1,767	−0.1%

Year	Pop.	±%
1921	1,779	+0.7%
1930	2,003	+12.6%
1950	2,185	+9.1%
1961	2,318	+6.1%
1970	2,296	−0.9%

Year	Pop.	±%
1980	2,314	+0.8%
1991	2,307	−0.3%
2001	2,285	−1.0%
2011	2,253	−1.4%
2021	2,139	−5.1%

Source: Censuses

== Transport ==
There are no railways or major roads passing through the municipality.

== Sights ==
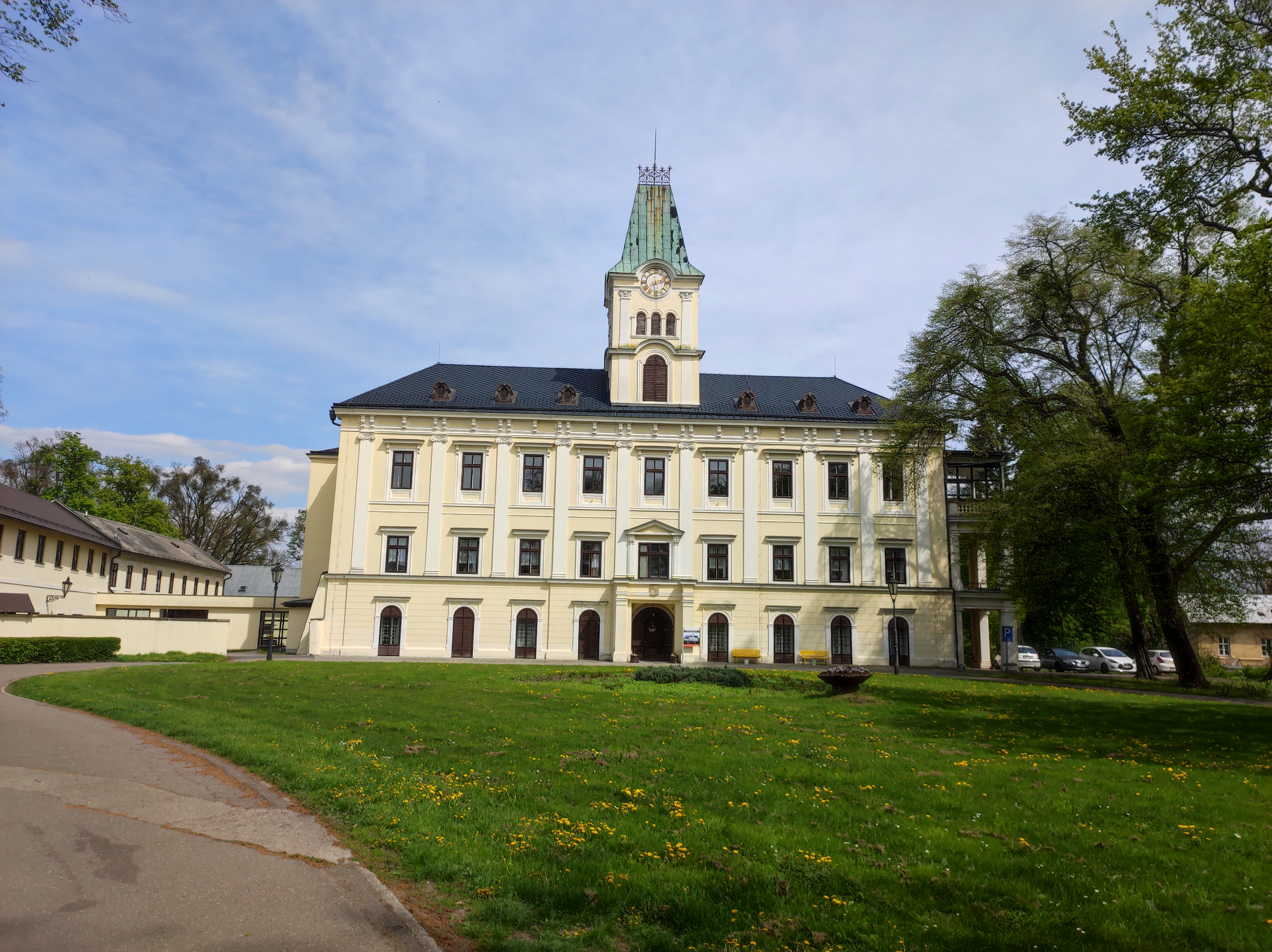
Kvasice Castle

The Kvasice Castle was originally a Gothic fortress, first mentioned in 1365. In the 1580s, it was rebuilt into a Renaissance castle. At the beginning of the 19th century, it was modified in the Neoclassical style into its present form. In the mid-19th century, an English park was founded around the castle. Today the castle houses a retirement home.

The Church of the Assumption of the Virgin Mary was built in 1730–1740. It is a large valuable one-nave church with a pair of thin towers.

The cemetery church in Kvasice is also dedicated to the Assumption of the Virgin Mary. It has a late Gothic nave from the 15th century and a Renaissance tower, which was added in 1577. The architectural value was partly damaged by inappropriate reconstruction in the years 1992–1993.

== Notable people ==
- Friedrich von Thun (born 1942), Austrian actor
