= Wolf Englert =

- Born: 12 November 1924; Ulm, Baden-Württemberg, Germany
- Died: 22 March 1997 (aged 72); Gmunden, Austria
- Occupation: Art director
- Years active: 1954–1988 (film)

Wolf Englert (1924–1997) was a German painter and art director who designed the sets of a number of German films and television series.

== Selected filmography ==
- Hubertus Castle (1954)
- The Sinful Village (1954)
- The Angel with the Flaming Sword (1954)
- Request Concert (1955)
- El Hakim (1957)
- The Daring Swimmer (1957)
- Rosemary (1958)
- I Was All His (1958)
- The Blue Sea and You (1959)
- At Blonde Kathrein's Place (1959)
- Boomerang (1960)
- Three Moves to Freedom (1960)
- The Last of Mrs. Cheyney (1961)
- When the Music Plays at Wörthersee (1962)
- Don't Tell Me Any Stories (1964)
- Tales of a Young Scamp (1964)
- Aunt Frieda (1965)
- Once a Greek (1966)
- When Ludwig Goes on Manoeuvres (1967)
- The Duck Rings at Half Past Seven (1968)
- Hotel Royal (1969, TV film)
- Perrak (1970)

== Bibliography ==
- Herzogenrath, Bernd. The Films of Edgar G. Ulmer. Scarecrow Press, 2009.
