= Wolf Wirth =

German cinematographer

- Born: 30 July 1929; Nuremberg, Bavaria, Germany
- Died: 30 June 2005 (aged 75); Munich, Bavaria, Germany
- Occupation: Cinematographer
- Years active: 1954-1976 (film)

Wolf Wirth (1929–2005) was a German cinematographer. He worked on more than fifty cinema films and television releases. Although primarily associated with commercial West German filmmaking, he also shot New German Cinema films such as Cat and Mouse.

== Selected filmography ==
- The Bread of Those Early Years (1962)
- Venusberg (1963)
- The River Line (1964)
- Tonio Kröger (1964)
- The Blood of the Walsungs (1965)
- The Gentlemen (1965)
- Who Wants to Sleep? (1965)
- Aunt Frieda (1965)
- DM-Killer (1965)
- Once a Greek (1966)
- I Am Looking for a Man (1966)
- Cat and Mouse (1967)
- When Ludwig Goes on Manoeuvres (1967)
- The Death of a Double (1967)
- The Liar and the Nun (1967)
- The Duck Rings at Half Past Seven (1968)
- The New Adventures of Snow White (1969)
- Come to Vienna, I'll Show You Something! (1970)
- Slap in the Face (1970)
- Der scharfe Heinrich (1971)
- Undine 74 (1974)
- Potato Fritz (1976)

== Bibliography ==
- Rother, Rainer (ed.) German Film: From the Archives of the Deutsche Kinemathek. Hatje Cantz Verlag, 2024.
