= Serenade for Two Spies =

- Directed by: Michael Pfleghar
- Written by: Klaus Munro; Michael Pfleghar
- Distributed by: Variety Distribution
- Release date: 1965
- Countries: West Germany; Italy

Serenade for Two Spies (German: Serenade für zwei Spione, Italian: Sinfonia per due spie) is a 1965 West German-Italian spy film directed by Michael Pfleghar.

== Cast ==
- Hellmut Lange as John Krim
- Tony Kendall as Pepino
- Barbara Lass as Tamara
- Heidelinde Weis as Goldfeather
- Wolfgang Neuss as Secret Service Chief
- Mimmo Palmara as Cormoran (as Dick Palmer)
- Annie Giss
