= Don't Tell Me Any Stories =

1964 film

- Directed by: Dietrich Haugk
- Written by: Jo Hanns Rösler (novel); Theo Maria Werner; Dietrich Haugk; Gerhard Bronner
- Produced by: Theo Maria Werner
- Starring: Heidelinde Weis; Karl Michael Vogler; Georg Thomalla
- Cinematography: Günther Senftleben
- Edited by: Claus von Boro
- Music by: Karl Bette
- Production company: Parnass Film
- Distributed by: Columbia-Bavaria Film
- Release date: 17 December 1964
- Running time: 101 minutes
- Country: West Germany
- Language: German

Don't Tell Me Any Stories (German: Erzähl mir nichts, lit. 'Tell Me Nothing') is a 1964 West German comedy film directed by Dietrich Haugk and starring Heidelinde Weis, Karl Michael Vogler and Georg Thomalla.

It was shot at the Bavaria Studios in Munich and on location in Trentino. The film's sets were designed by the art director Wolf Englert and Bruno Monden. It was shot in Eastmancolor.

== Cast ==
- Heidelinde Weis as Martine Dörner
- Karl Michael Vogler as Dr. Nikolaus Feyl
- Georg Thomalla as Hugo Bach
- Ursula von Borsody as Rosalinde Bach
- Thomas Reiner as Dr. Waldemar Hecht
- Alice Treff as Die Tante
- Lothar Röhrig as Johann Sebastian 'Wastl' Bach
- Hans Stadtmüller as Ein Münchner
- Alfred Pongratz as Emmerich Mehler
- Stefan Patkai as Singender Barpianist
- Ulrich Beiger as Kunde im Schreibbüro
- Toni Treutler as Dame mit Brille
- Gerda Maria Klein as Fräulein Gausmann
- Kurt Zips as Herr mit Hut
- Paul Bös as Busfahrer

== Bibliography ==
- Bergfelder, Tim. International Adventures: German Popular Cinema and European Co-Productions in the 1960s. Berghahn Books, 2005.
