= Elisabeth Orth =

Austrian actress (1936–2025)

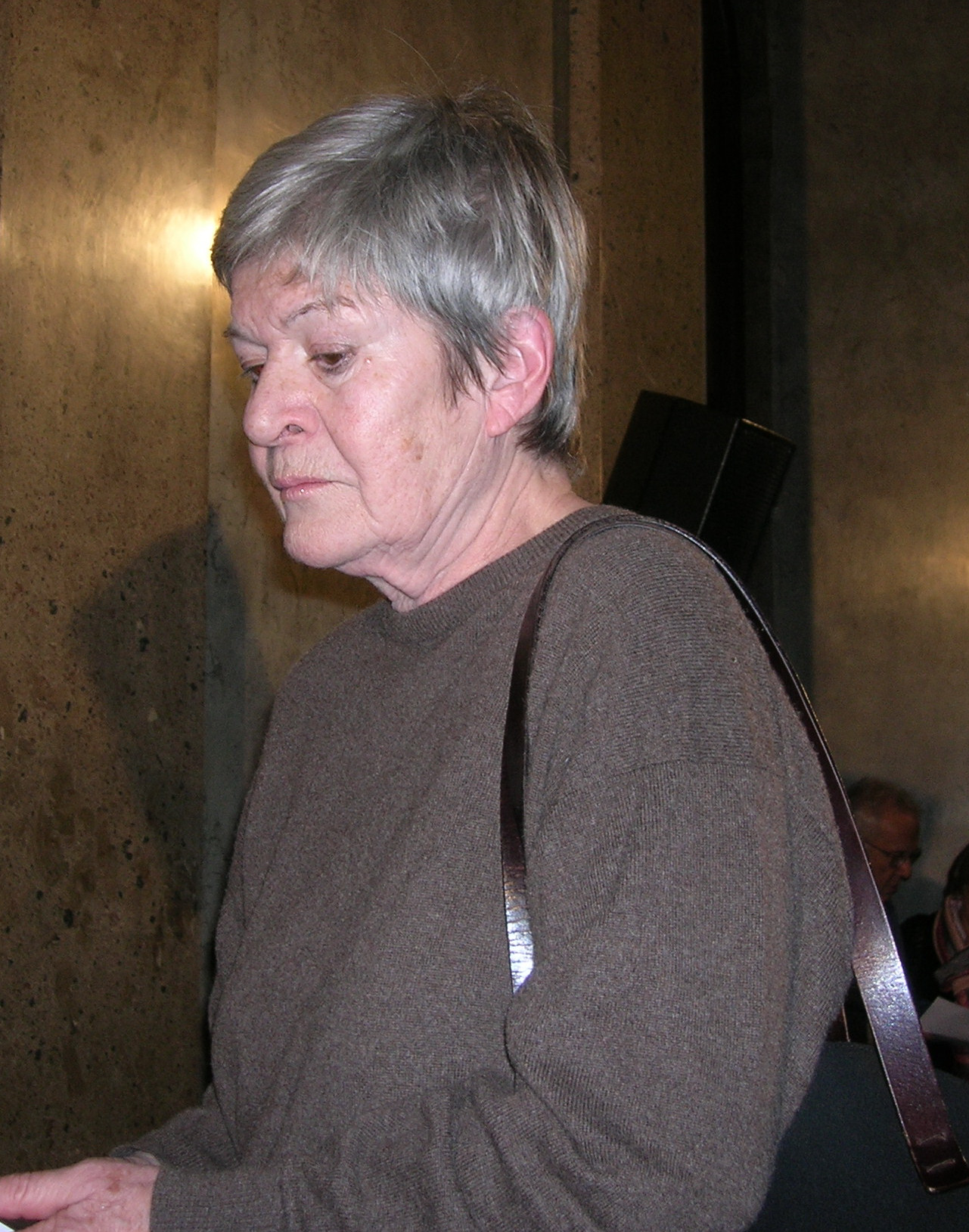
- Orth in 2007
- Born: Elisabeth Hörbiger; 8 February 1936; Vienna, Austria
- Died: 17 May 2025 (aged 89); Vienna, Austria
- Education: Max Reinhardt Seminar
- Occupation: Actress

Elisabeth Orth (née Hörbiger; 8 February 1936 – 17 May 2025) was an Austrian actress.

== Life and career ==
Born in Vienna on 8 February 1936, Orth was the daughter of actors Attila Hörbiger and Paula Wessely and the sister of actresses Christiane Hörbiger and Maresa Hörbiger. After studying at the Max Reinhardt Seminar, she joined the Volkstheater, Vienna and the Residence Theatre. She then joined the Burgtheater, where she remained for the remainder of her career, with the exception of a stint at the Schaubühne from 1995 to 1999.

Until November 2019, Orth served as president of Aktion gegen den Antisemitismus in Österreich, when she was succeeded by her son. On 11 January 2015, she read a text from the Austrian government at the "Together against Terror" march at the Ballhausplatz in front of 12,000 spectators.

Elisabeth Orth died in Vienna on 17 May 2025, at the age of 89.

== Filmography ==
- Kurzer Prozess (1967)
- Der Einstand (1977)
- Georg Elser – Einer aus Deutschland (1989)
- Single Bells (1997)
- The Inheritors (1998)
- O Palmenbaum (2000)
- Mein Kampf (2009)
- Pepperminta (2009)
- Tatort: Der traurige König (2012)
- Hannas Entscheidung (2012)
- Polt (2013)
- Superegos (2014)
- München Mord: Die ganze Stadt ein Depp
