= Tales of a Young Scamp =

1964 West German comedy film

- Directed by: Helmut Käutner
- Written by: Kurt Heuser; Franz Seitz
- Based on: Lausbubengeschichten by Ludwig Thoma
- Produced by: Franz Seitz
- Starring: Hansi Kraus; Heidelinde Weis; Georg Thomalla
- Cinematography: Helmut Bahr; Adi Gürtner; Heinz Pehlke
- Edited by: Klaus Dudenhöfer
- Music by: Rolf A. Wilhelm
- Production company: Franz Seitz Filmproduktion
- Distributed by: Columbia-Bavaria Filmgesellschaft
- Release date: 15 October 1964
- Running time: 102 minutes
- Country: West Germany
- Language: German

Tales of a Young Scamp (German: Lausbubengeschichten) is a 1964 West German period family comedy film directed by Helmut Käutner and starring Hansi Kraus, Heidelinde Weis and Georg Thomalla. It was shot in Eastmancolor at the Bavaria Studios in Munich and on location around the resort town of Tegernsee. The film's sets were designed by the art director Wolf Englert. It is based on a nostalgic depiction of Bavarian life in the late nineteenth century by Ludwig Thoma. It was a major commercial success and inspired a number of similar films into the 1970s. The following year Aunt Frieda directed by Werner Jacobs was released, inspired by Thoma's novel of the same title.

== Cast ==
- Hansi Kraus as Ludwig Thoma
- Heidelinde Weis as Cora Thoma
- Friedrich von Thun as Franz Reiser
- Käthe Braun as Theres Thoma
- Georg Thomalla as Geheimrat
- Renate Kasché as Aennchen Thoma
- Harald Juhnke as Stuewe
- Michael Verhoeven as Karl Schultheiss
- Carl Wery as Joseph Semmelmeier
- Willy Rösner as Dominikus Pfanzelter
- Michl Lang as Josef Filser
- Rudolf Rhomberg as Pfarrer Falkenberg, 'Kindlein'
- Beppo Brem as Bauer Rafenauer
- Oliver Hassencamp as Professor Bindinger
- Ilse Pagé as Geheimratstochter
- Franz Muxeneder as Pedell Quirin Vögeler
- Ernst Fritz Fürbringer as Schuldirektor
- Hilli Wildenhain as Frau Semmelmeier
- Balduin Baas as Privatlehrer
- Rosl Mayr as Innocenta
- Else Quecke as Emilie, Frau Geheimrat
- Pierre Franckh as Arthur
- Elisabeth Flickenschildt as Tante Frieda

== Bibliography ==
- Bergfelder, Tim. International Adventures: German Popular Cinema and European Co-Productions in the 1960s. Berghahn Books, 2005.
- Rother, Rainer (ed.) German Film: From the Archives of the Deutsche Kinemathek. Hatje Cantz Verlag, 2024.
