= Dead Woman from Beverly Hills =

1964 film

- Film poster
- Directed by: Michael Pfleghar
- Written by: Curt Goetz; Peter Laregh; Michael Pfleghar; Hansjürgen Pohland
- Produced by: Hansjürgen Pohland
- Starring: Heidelinde Weis; Klausjürgen Wussow; Horst Frank
- Cinematography: Ernst Wild
- Edited by: Margot von Schlieffen
- Music by: Heinz Kiessling
- Production company: Modern Art Film
- Distributed by: Constantin Film
- Release date: 9 April 1964
- Running time: 110 minutes
- Country: West Germany
- Language: German

Dead Woman from Beverly Hills (German: Die Tote von Beverly Hills) is a 1964 West German drama film directed by Michael Pfleghar and starring Heidelinde Weis, Klausjürgen Wussow and Horst Frank. It was entered in the 1964 Cannes Film Festival.

== Cast ==
- Heidelinde Weis as Lu Sostlov
- Klausjürgen Wussow as C.G.
- Horst Frank as Manning / Dr. Steininger
- Wolfgang Neuss as Ben
- Ernst Fritz Fürbringer as Professor Sostlov
- Peter Schütte as Swendka
- Bruno Dietrich as Peter de Lorm
- Ellen Kessler as a Tiddy Sister
- Alice Kessler as a Tiddy Sister
- Herbert Weissbach as Priest
- Walter Giller
