= Brainwashed (film) =

1960 film

- Directed by: Gerd Oswald
- Written by: Harold Medford, Gerd Oswald
- Produced by: Luggi Waldleitner
- Starring: Curd Jürgens, Hansjörg Felmy
- Cinematography: Günther Senftleben
- Edited by: K. M. Eckstein
- Music by: Hans-Martin Majewski
- Distributed by: Allied Artists Pictures (USA)
- Release date: September 16, 1960
- Running time: 102 minutes
- Country: West Germany
- Language: German

Brainwashed (original title Schachnovelle, "Chess Novella") is a 1960 German drama film directed by Gerd Oswald and starring Curt Jürgens, Claire Bloom and Hansjörg Felmy. It is based on Austrian author Stefan Zweig's novella The Royal Game.

== Plot ==
Chess world champion Centowic wants to travel by ship to an important chess tournament. However, the ship's departure is delayed by the belated arrival of a mysterious and obviously anxious passenger accompanied by Bishop Ambrosse.

During the trip, passengers ask grumpy Centowic to play a chess game, which he reluctantly agrees to. Centowic's opponents are about to lose the match. However, the mysterious passenger, who accidentally joins the scene, intervenes and helps them draw the game. Centowic is amazed to not have ever seen the stranger, who, as he says, has just had his first chess piece in his hands, at any important tournament.

A flashback tells the stranger's story: He is Werner von Basil, an Austrian lawyer. Together with Bishop Ambrosse, he hides art treasures abroad in order to protect them from the national socialists who had just occupied Austria. Von Basil doesn't take the bishop's warnings about the threat for him too seriously. At a party given by von Basil, newly inaugurated Gestapo man Hans Berger uses his girlfriend, ballet dancer Irene Andreny, to try and elicit information on the art treasures from von Basil. When she is unsuccessful, Berger has von Basil arrested the same evening. In order to break von Basil's will, Berger puts him into solitary confinement. Von Basil has all his personal belongings taken from him; the only variety in his every-day routine is the prison guard who provides him with food.

Berger is pressured not only by Irene, who feels neglected, but also by his superior Hartmann, as von Basil keeps the hiding-place of the art treasures a secret even after six weeks of isolation. As von Basil pretends to be cooperative and is brought to a questioning, he succeeds in stealing a book from a coat pocket. During the questioning, von Basil stops being cooperative, sensing the sympathy Irene, who is present, feels for him. Back again in his room, von Basil is disappointed to learn that the book he has stolen just deals with chess matches. Due to a lack of alternatives, von Basil reads it and uses pieces of bread as chess pieces to re-enact the matches described in the book. Even as Berger discovers his secret and deprives him of the book, von Basil plays chess against himself in his mind.

After asking bishop Ambrose for help, Irene begs Berger to release von Basil but is insulted by Berger. As von Basil suffers from a nervous breakdown but still refuses to reveal his secrets, Hartmann now tries on his own to break von Basil's will.

As von Basil plays yet another match against Centowic, he furiously attacks Centowic, as he wants to learn from Centowic how much information he gave away during his solitary confinement. Irene joins the scene and is able to assure von Basil that he revealed none of his secrets. Irene was spared harassment; Berger was no longer of use for his superiors. Von Basil and Irene fall in love with each other.

== Cast ==
- Curd Jürgens — von Basil
- Hansjörg Felmy — Berger
- Mario Adorf — Karl Centowic
- Claire Bloom — Irene Andreny
- Hans Söhnker — Bishop Ambrosse
- Albert Bessler — Scientist
- Rudolf Forster — Hotel manager
- Alan Gifford — Mac Iver
- Jan Hendriks — First Officer
- Albert Lieven — Hartmann
- Harald Maresch — Ballet Master
- Dietmar Schönherr — Rabbi
- Karel Stepanek — Baranow
- Wolfgang Wahl — von Basils' Guardian, called Moonface
- Dorothea Wieck — Countess
- Rijk de Gooyer — Berger's Secretary
- Susanne Körber-Harlan — Young Lady

== Production ==
Filming took place from 11 April to 14 May 1960 in Vienna, Yugoslavia and Venice as well as in the Ufa studios in Berlin-Tempelhof. The premiere was on 2 September 1960 at the Forum Wien.

Rudolf Teschner is mentioned in the credits under "technical advice on chess".

== Reception ==
Variety called it "slow moving but interesting."
