= Girls Behind Bars (1965 film) =

1965 film

- Directed by: Rudolf Zehetgruber
- Written by: Rudolf Zehetgruber
- Produced by: Artur Brauner
- Starring: Heidelinde Weis; Harald Leipnitz; Harry Riebauer
- Cinematography: Hans Jura
- Edited by: Walter Wischniewsky
- Music by: Raimund Rosenberger
- Production company: CCC Film
- Distributed by: Gloria Film
- Release date: 20 August 1965
- Running time: 94 minutes
- Country: West Germany
- Language: German

Girls Behind Bars (German: Mädchen hinter Gittern) is a 1965 West German drama film directed by Rudolf Zehetgruber and starring Heidelinde Weis, Harald Leipnitz and Harry Riebauer. It was shot at the Spandau Studios in West Berlin. The film's sets were designed by the art director Heinrich Weidemann. It is a remake of the 1949 film of the same title.

== Synopsis ==
The plot focuses on the inmates of a juvenile detention home for girls, all of whom have been brought there due to the trouble past that brought them into drugs, prostitution or other crimes. The rebellious Karin stands aloof from the other prisoners, but the kindly young pastor Johannes is able to connect with her eventually, bringing her tragic past to light.

== Cast ==
- Heidelinde Weis as Karin
- Harald Leipnitz as Pfarrer Johannes
- Harry Riebauer as Frank Albin
- Sabine Bethmann as Fräulein König
- Adelheid Seeck as Dr. Harzeck
- Ursula Herking as Josefa
- Ellen Umlauf as Fräulein Kant
- Helga Marlo as Frau Inge, Karins Mutter
- Uta Levka as Martina
- Carsta Löck as Frau Leischke
- Elke Aberle as Uschi
- Ingrid Bauer as Lydia
- Brigitte Freyer as Monika
- Adelheid Hinz as Erika
- Marianne Hoffmann as Christa
- Helga Schwartz as Berta

== Bibliography ==
- Geller, Friedhelm. Religion im Film: Lexikon mit Kurzkritiken und Stichworten zu 2400 Kinofilmen. Katholisches Institut für Medieninformation, 1999.
- Rüdiger, Christian. Schule im deutschen Spielfilm: Filmische Dimensionen von Bildung, Erziehung und sozialer Selektion. De Gruyter, 2023.
