= Friedrich von Thun =

Austrian actor (born 1942)

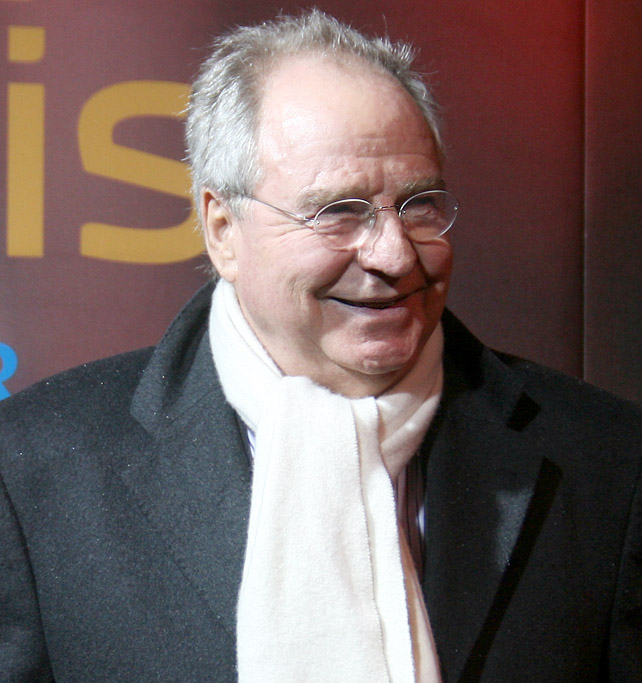
- Friedrich von Thun in 2012
- Born: Friedrich Ernst Peter Paul Maria Thun-Hohenstein; 30 June 1942 (age 83); Kvasice, Protectorate of Bohemia and Moravia
- Occupation: Actor
- Years active: 1958–present
- Children: 2, including Max

Signature
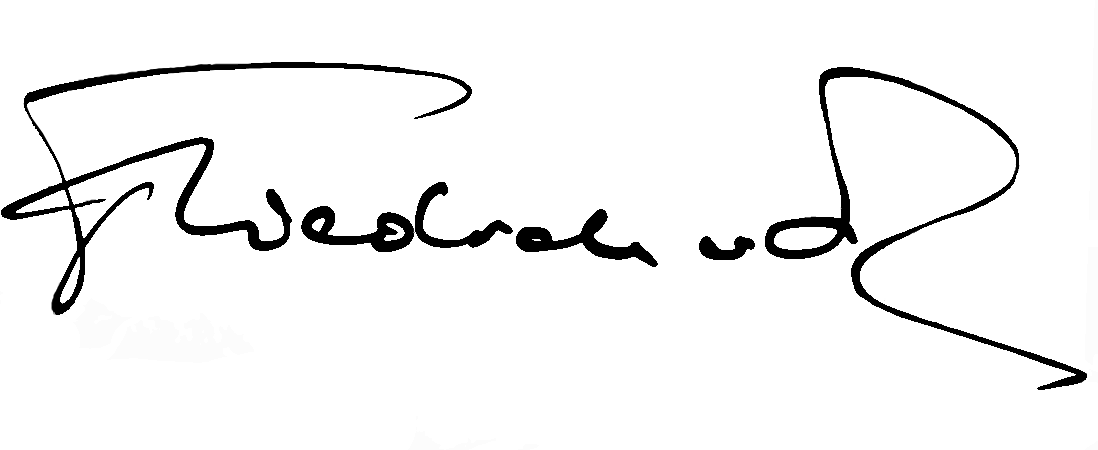

Friedrich Ernst Peter Paul Maria Thun-Hohenstein (born 30 June 1942) is an Austrian actor. He appeared in more than a hundred films since 1958.

== Biography ==
Friedrich von Thun was born on 30 June 1942 in Kvasice, Protectorate of Bohemia and Moravia (now the Czech Republic). A descendant of an ancient Tyrolean noble House of Thun und Hohenstein, Friedrich von Thun grew up in Leoben, Austria, as the youngest son of Count Ernst von Thun und Hohenstein (1905–1985) and his wife, Baroness Maria Theresia Wiedersperger von Wiedersperg (born 1911). He began his acting career in 1958 and mainly works in Germany, where he lives in Munich. His son Max von Thun is also an actor.

== Selected filmography ==
Film
Year	Title	Role	Notes
1964	Tales of a Young Scamp	Franz Reiser	
1965	The Swedish Girl	Anton Treuberg	
1965	The Gentlemen	Graf - episode 'Die Intellektuellen'	
1965	Who Wants to Sleep?	Heitzmann	
1965	Die fromme Helene	Vetter Franz	
1965	Aunt Frieda	Franz Reiser	
1966	Liselotte of the Palatinate	Rudo	
1966	Onkel Filser – Allerneueste Lausbubengeschichten	Franz Reiser	
1967	When Ludwig Goes on Manoeuvres	Franz Reiser	
1968	Assignment K	Rolfe	Uncredited
1970	O.k.	Sergeant Tony Meserve	
1970	Schulmädchen-Report: Was Eltern nicht für möglich halten	Reporter	
1971	Schulmädchen-Report 2. Teil: Was Eltern den Schlaf raubt	Reporter	
1972	Schulmädchen-Report. 3. Teil: Was Eltern nicht mal ahnen	Reporter	
1976	MitGift	Garch	
1980	Sunday Children		
1986	Ginger and Fred	Kidnapped Industrialist	
1993	The Lucona Affair	Minister Klaus Weidenfeld	
1993	Schindler's List	Rolf Czurda	
1997	The Pharmacist	Rolf Moormann	
2002	Amen.	Gerstein's Father	
2011	Ein mörderisches Geschäft	Rüdiger Siebert	
2013	Harms	Knauer	
2015	Traumfrauen	Carl Reimann	
2017	Cold Hell	Karl Steiner	
2017	Die Häschenschule – Jagd nach dem Goldenen Ei	Eitelfritz	Voice

TV
Year	Title	Role	Notes
1973	Ein unheimlich starker Abgang	Defense lawyer	
1977	Bier und Spiele	Werner Schulze	14 episodes
1978–1979	The Famous Five	Rogers	
1980–1981	Ringstraßenpalais	Bernhard Graf Artenberg	7 episodes
1984	The Devil's Lieutenant	Archduke Franz Ferdinand	
1984	Eine blassblaue Frauenschrift	Leonidas Tachezy	
1989	The Play with Billions	Albrecht Maybach	
1989–1990	Das Erbe der Guldenburgs	Hannes von Meerungen	25 episodes
1991	L'Amour maudit de Leisenbohg	Duke Richard	
1994–1996	Ärzte: Dr. Schwarz und Dr. Martin	Dr. Wolfgang Schwarz	8 episodes
1995	I Love My Daughter's Husband	Stefan Struck	
1996	The Return of Sandokan	Lord Parker	
1997	Zwei Brüder	Friedrich Rhomberg	
1998–2004	Die Verbrechen des Professor Capellari	Professor Capellari	17 episodes
2001	Bargeld lacht	Karl Weiss	
2003	Hitler: The Rise of Evil	Erich Ludendorff	
2004	Cold Spring	Carl Berger	
2009	Abducted	Albert Targensee	
2009	Sisi	Joseph Radetzky von Radetz	
2014	Sarajevo	Sektionsrat Wiesner	
