= Rudolf Rhomberg =

Austrian actor

Rudolf Rhomberg (1 February 1920 - 6 June 1968) was an Austrian film actor.

== Partial filmography ==
- Two Times Lotte (1950) - Photograph
- Call Over the Air (1951) - Piefke
- Eva im Frack (1951)
- Wienerinnen (1952)
- Abenteuer im Schloss (1952) - Karl
- The Venus of Tivoli (1953) - Leopold Gerzner
- 08/15 (1954) - Unteroffizier Rumpler
- Hello, My Name Is Cox (1955) - Barbesitzer Wilkie
- Love's Carnival (1955) - Wirt
- 08/15 at Home (1955) - Ortsgruppenführer (uncredited)
- Weil du arm bist, mußt du früher sterben (1956) - Felix Gruber
- Viele kamen vorbei (1956) - Bullig
- Kitty and the Great Big World (1956) - Bistrowirt
- The Girl and the Legend (1957) - Sam
- Marriages Forbidden (1957) - Schorsch Mittnacht
- Der Bauerndoktor von Bayrischzell (1957) - Wachtmeister (uncredited)
- An American in Salzburg (1958) - Signor Locatelli
- A Woman Who Knows What She Wants (1958) - Lyzeumsdirektor Dr. Kladde
- Resurrection (1958) - Smjelkoff
- Wenn die Conny mit dem Peter (1958) - Alois Specht
- The Beautiful Adventure (1959) - Jules Tardy
- The Man Who Walked Through the Wall (1959) - Der Maler
- Ein Tag, der nie zu Ende geht (1959) - Mr. Mackintosh
- The Good Soldier Schweik (1960) - Stabsarzt
- A Woman for Life (1960) - Ganove #2
- What Is Father Doing in Italy? (1961) - Signore Nobile
- Frau Holle (1961) - Hofmarschall
- Jedermann (1961) - Dicker Vetter
- Stahlnetz: Spur 211 (1962, TV series episode) - Polizeihauptmeister Rathje
- Snow White and the Seven Jugglers (1962) - Artist Simson
- A Mission for Mr. Dodd (1964) - Glenville
- Tales of a Young Scamp (1964) - Pfarrer Falkenberg, 'Kindlein'
- The Blood of the Walsungs (1965) - Opernbesucher
- Aunt Frieda (1965) - Pfarrer 'Kindlein' Falkenberg
- I Am Looking for a Man (1966) - Hoteldirektor Bock
- Once a Greek (1966) - Bruder Bibi
- Onkel Filser (1966) - Kaplan 'Kindlein' Falkenberg
- Glorious Times at the Spessart Inn (1967) - Onkel Max
- The Liar and the Nun (1967) - Father Accursius
- When Ludwig Goes on Manoeuvres (1967) - Falkenberg
- Scarabea: How Much Land Does a Man Need? (Scarabea - wieviel Erde braucht der Mensch?) (1969, released posthumously)
