= Heinz-Leo Fischer =

Austrian actor (1902–1977)

- Born: November 19, 1902; Vienna, Austro-Hungarian Empire
- Died: November 4, 1977 (aged 74); Munich, West Germany
- Occupation: Actor
- Years active: 1922–1973

Heinz-Leo Fischer (19 November 1902 – 4 November 1977) was an Austrian stage, television and film actor. During the Weimar Republic of the 1920s, he appeared in plays such as Marlborough Goes to War.

== Filmography ==
Year	Title	Role	Notes
1922	Homo sum		
1930	Kohlhiesel's Daughters	Toni	
1949	Long Is the Road	Mieczyszlaw Chodetzki	
1950	The Violin Maker of Mittenwald	Serventa	
1951	Die Schuld des Dr. Homma	Landgerichtsrat Holder	
1952	Die schöne Tölzerin	Kavalier	
1953	Music by Night	Manager Miller	
1954	Prisoners of Love	Ansager der Todesbahn	
1954	Spring Song	Mister Fish	
1956	Santa Lucia	Vittorio	
1958	… und nichts als die Wahrheit		Uncredited
1958	The Crammer	Dr. Rössler	
1959	The Beautiful Adventure	Pinatel	
1964	Time of the Innocent	Hotelier	
1965	The Blood of the Walsungs	Wendelin / ein Diener-a servant	
1968	Assignment K	Joseph	Uncredited
1969	Köpfchen in das Wasser, Schwänzchen in die Höh’	Herr Bronner	

== Bibliography ==
- Youngkin, Stephen. The Lost One: A Life of Peter Lorre. University Press of Kentucky, 2005.
