= Aunt Frieda =

1965 film

- Directed by: Werner Jacobs
- Written by: Franz Seitz
- Based on: Aunt Frieda by Ludwig Thoma
- Produced by: Franz Seitz
- Starring: Elisabeth Flickenschildt; Hans Kraus; Gustav Knuth
- Cinematography: Wolf Wirth
- Edited by: Ingeborg Taschner
- Music by: Rolf A. Wilhelm
- Production company: Franz Seitz Filmproduktion
- Distributed by: Constantin Film
- Release date: 22 December 1965
- Running time: 87 minutes
- Country: West Germany
- Language: German

Aunt Frieda (German: Tante Frieda – Neue Lausbubengeschichten) is a 1965 West German historical comedy film directed by Werner Jacobs and starring Elisabeth Flickenschildt, Hans Kraus and Gustav Knuth. It is based on the 1907 novel Aunt Frieda by Ludwig Thoma. It was shot at the Bavaria Studios in Munich. The film's sets were designed by the art director Wolf Englert.

== Cast ==
- Elisabeth Flickenschildt as Tante Frieda
- Hansi Kraus as Ludwig Thoma
- Gunther Philipp as Inspektor Dirnhirn
- Gustav Knuth as Gustav Schultheiss
- Heidelinde Weis as Cousine Cora
- Friedrich von Thun as Franz Reiser
- Käthe Braun as Mutter Thoma
- Michael Hinz as Karl Schultheiss
- Hans Quest as Rittmeister von Stuelphagel
- Renate Kasché as Aennchen
- Michl Lang as Josef Filser
- Beppo Brem as Gastwirt Quirin
- Fred Liewehr as Prinzregent
- Rudolf Rhomberg as Pfarrer 'Kindlein' Falkenberg
- Oliver Hassencamp as Professor Bindinger
- Carl Wery as Hauptmann Joseph Semmelmaier
- Rudolf Schündler as Onkel Rudolf Waschkühn
- Margarete Haagen as Kathi
- Ilse Petri as Frau Waschkühn
- Olf Fischer as Onkel Franz

== See also ==
- Tales of a Young Scamp, a 1964 film directed by Helmut Käutner

== Bibliography ==
- Bock, Hans-Michael; Bergfelder, Tim, eds. (2009). The Concise Cinegraph: Encyclopaedia of German Cinema. New York: Berghahn Books. ISBN 978-1-57181-655-9.
