= Karola Ebeling =

German actress (born 1935)

- Born: 23 May 1935 (age 91); Berlin, Germany
- Occupation: Actress
- Years active: 1954-

Karola Ebeling (born 23 May 1935) is a German television and film actress.

== Selected filmography ==
- Love is Forever (1954)
- The Beautiful Miller (1954)
- Intrigue and Love (1959)

== Bibliography ==
- Goble, Alan. The Complete Index to Literary Sources in Film. Walter de Gruyter, 1999.
