= Karl Schönböck =

Austrian actor

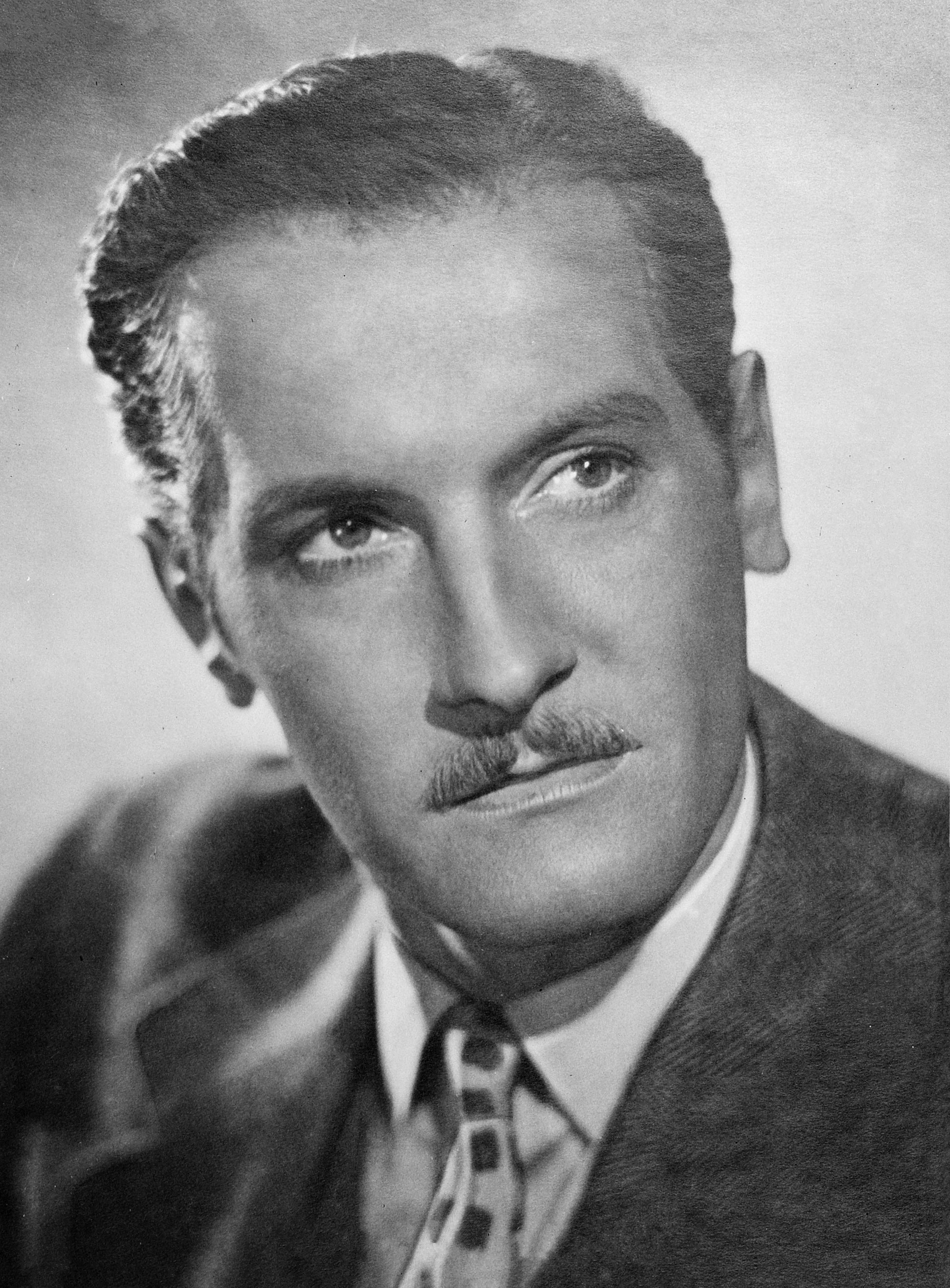
Karl Schönböck

Karl Schönböck (4 February 1909 in Vienna, Austria-Hungary – 24 March 2001 in Munich, Republic of Germany) was an Austrian actor.

== Selected filmography ==
- Flowers from Nice (1936) as Count Ulrich von Traunstein
- The Girl Irene (1936) as Sir John Corbett
- Daphne and the Diplomat (1937) as Bentley
- Anna Favetti (1938) as Kingston
- The Blue Fox (1938) as Trill
- The Golden Mask (1939) as Sepp Kramer
- Bismarck (1940) as Kaiser Franz Joseph
- Mistress Moon (1941) as Paul Rüdinger
- The Big Game (1942) as Richter the photograph
- Voice of the Heart (1942) as Volontär Benthien
- Bravo Acrobat! (1943) as Orlando
- Titanic (1943) as John Jacob Astor IV
- The Noltenius Brothers (1945) as Baron Kontakt
- Peter Voss, Thief of Millions (1946) as Bobby Dodd
- An Everyday Story (1948) as Herbert Winkler
- Don't Dream, Annette (1949) as Klaus
- I'll Make You Happy (1949) as Viktor
- The Blue Straw Hat (1949) as Paul
- Sensation in Savoy (1950) as René Rocan
- The Man in Search of Himself (1950) as Jack d'Alimonte
- My Niece Susanne (1950) as Don Manual Carcocastilla
- Taxi-Kitty (1950) as Molander
- The Forester's Daughter (1952) as Kaiser Franz Josef
- The Chaste Libertine (1952) as Dr. Fellner
- A Very Big Child (1952) as Alexander van Straaten
- We're Dancing on the Rainbow (1952) as Philip
- Hit Parade (1953) as Fred Pauli
- Lavender (1953) as Gallenberg
- Must We Get Divorced? (1953) as Prosecutor Paul
- The Night Without Morals (1953) as Philipp Weinsberg
- Fanfare of Marriage (1953) as Dobler
- The Charming Young Lady (1953) as Hektor Kranz
- Fireworks (1954) as Alexander Oberholzer
- Roses from the South (1954) as Sergius Konstantin
- The Gypsy Baron (1954) as Commander Homonay
- Her First Date (1955) as Waldemar, Mathematikprofessor
- The Congress Dances (1955) as Count Metternich
- The Bath in the Barn (1956) as Don Fernando
- The Unexcused Hour (1957) as Professor Hans Weiringer
- Love Now, Pay Later (1959) as Von Riedendank
- You Must Be Blonde on Capri (1961)
- Pichler's Books Are Not in Order (1961) as Direktor Härtel
- One Prettier Than the Other (1961) as Edgar Dirksen
- It Can't Always Be Caviar (1961) as Lovejoy
- This Time It Must Be Caviar (1961) as Lovejoy
- Fanfare of Marriage (1963)
- When Ludwig Goes on Manoeuvres (1967)
- The Liar and the Nun (1967) as Petrops, the butler
- The Long Day of Inspector Blomfield (1968)
- Pride and Vengeance (1968) as English Diplomat
- Don't Fumble, Darling (1970) as Schauspieler
- We'll Take Care of the Teachers (1970)
- Csárdáskirálynő (1971)
- 7 morts sur ordonnance (1975)
- Halali (1995) as Baron von Sarau

== Decorations and awards ==
- 1979: Merit Cross 1st Class of the Order of Merit of the Federal Republic of Germany (Verdienstkreuz 1. Klasse)
- 1985: Gold Film Award for outstanding service to the German film industry
- 1989: Austrian Cross of Honour for Science and Art, 1st class
