= Heidelinde Weis =

Austrian actress (1940–2023)

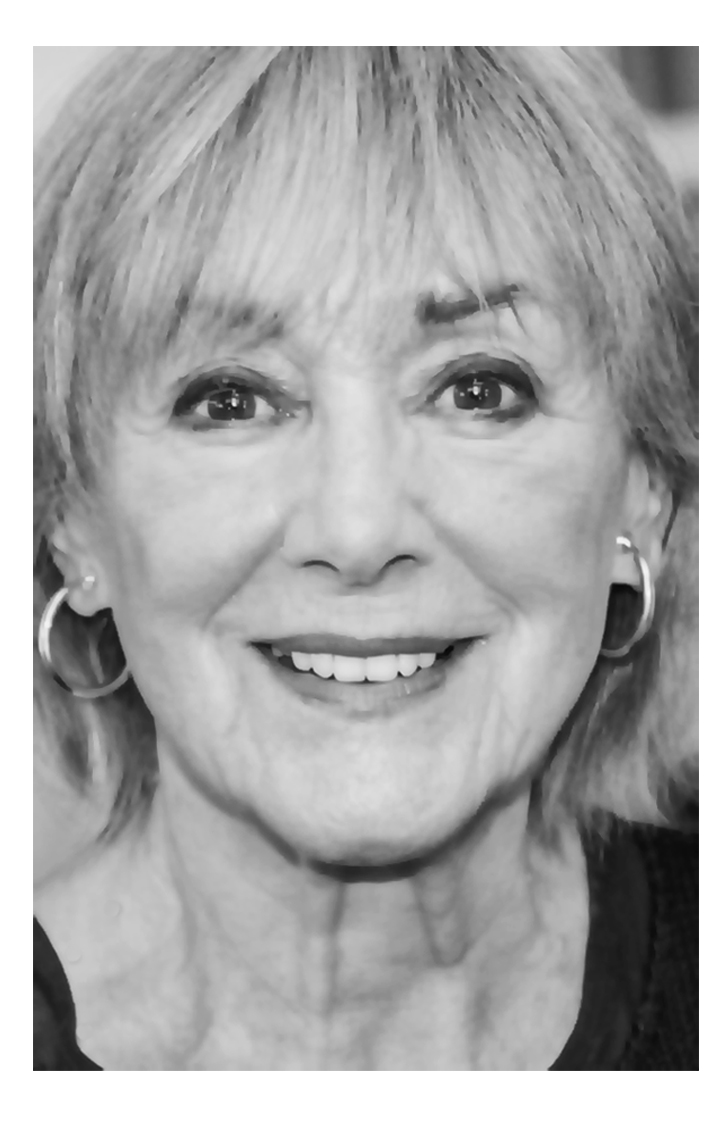
Weis in 2020

Heidelinde Weis (17 September 1940 – 24 November 2023) was an Austrian actress. Weis died on 24 November 2023, at the age of 83.

== Selected filmography ==
- I'm Marrying the Director (1960)
- Dead Woman from Beverly Hills (1964)
- Condemned to Sin (1964)
- Don't Tell Me Any Stories (1964)
- Tales of a Young Scamp (1964)
- Aunt Frieda (1965)
- Girls Behind Bars (1965)
- Serenade for Two Spies (1965)
- Tante Frieda (1965)
- Liselotte of the Palatinate (1966)
- Onkel Filser (1966)
- The Man Outside (1967)
- The Liar and the Nun (1967)
- When Ludwig Goes on Manoeuvres (1967)
- Something for Everyone (1970)
- The Woman in White (1971, TV miniseries)
- The Woman from Sarajevo (1980, TV film)
- Overheard (1984, TV film)
- The Black Forest Clinic (1985, TV series, 7 episodes)
- Am Anfang war der Seitensprung (1999, TV film)
- Liebe für Fortgeschrittene (2008, TV film)
- Die grünen Hügel von Wales (2010, TV film)
