= Robert Owens (composer) =

American composer and pianist

Robert Lee Owens III (September 19, 1925 – January 5, 2017) was an American composer, pianist, and actor.

== Biography ==
Owens was born in Denison, Texas, and grew up in Berkeley, California. Owens began playing piano at age 4 (taught by his mother Alpharetta Helm), composing at age 8, and performing at age 10.

After serving in the U.S. Army during World War II, Owens used the G.I. Bill to pursue musical education in Europe. He studied under Jules Gentil and Alfred Cortot at the École Normale de Musique de Paris in Paris between 1946 and 1950. In 1952, he debuted as a concert pianist in Copenhagen. He continued his studies under Grete Hinterhofer at the Vienna Academy of Music between 1953 and 1957.

In 1997, he appeared on the 2nd season of Alarm für Cobra 11 – Die Autobahnpolizei on one episode, “The Assassination” (Das Attentat) which he plays Jonathan Agade, the first elected democratic president on Monrovia.

Owens returned to the United States in 1957 to teach music at Albany State College in Georgia. During this time, he began setting the poems of Langston Hughes to music. In 1959, he relocated to Hamburg, Germany; in 1964, he moved to Munich. In Germany, he got a job as a film actor, and was soon in demand as a film and stage actor, composer, and pianist.

Owens's only completed opera, Kultur! Kultur!, was premiered in Ulm, Germany, in 1970; an English translation was premiered at the University of Nebraska-Lincoln on August 7, 2015.

Owens died January 5, 2017, in Munich.

== Works ==
Owens wrote and performed his First Piano Concerto with Berkeley's Young Peoples’ Symphony at the age of 15. He wrote many songs throughout his long career, using the poetry of Paul Laurence Dunbar, Waring Cuney, Emily Dickinson, Walt Whitman, Countee Cullen, and Langston Hughes. In 2006, he wrote the Idomeneo Quartet for oboe and strings, based on Mozart's opera of the same name.

A collection of Owens's published works, concert programs and reviews, photographs and other memorabilia resides at the University of Nebraska-Lincoln.

== Recognition and awards ==
- International Lifetime Achievement Award, from the National Association of Negro Musicians (2008)
- The Preisträger International Lifetime Achievement Award from AnDante Kulturmagazin
- "Lift Every Voice" Legacy Award for lifetime achievement in opera, from the National Opera Association (2009)
- Friend of the Arts, Kappa chapter of Sigma Alpha Iota (2009)
- Artist-in-residence at University of Michigan-Ann Arbor, University of Wisconsin-River Falls, Texas Southern University, and University of Nebraska-Lincoln
