= Elisabeth Flickenschildt =

German actress, producer and author (1905–1977)

- Born: 16 March 1905; Blankenese, Hamburg, German Empire
- Died: 26 October 1977 (aged 72); Stade, Lower Saxony, West Germany
- Occupation: Film editor
- Years active: 1935-1977 (film)

Elisabeth Ida Marie Flickenschildt (16 March 1905 – 26 October 1977) was a German actress, producer and author. She appeared in dozens of German language films and television productions between 1935 and 1976.

Flickenschildt was born in Hamburg, and died in Guderhandviertel. A street, Elisabeth-Flickenschildt-Straße, was named for her in Spandau, Berlin.

== Selected filmography ==
- Großreinemachen (1935) – Frau Paulsen
- The Unsuspecting Angel (1936) – Lotte Grün
- Du kannst nicht treu sein (1936) – Miss Nelly
- Strife Over the Boy Jo (1937) – Hafenmädchen
- The Broken Jug (1937) – Frau Brigitte
- Tango Notturno (1937) – Bessie Godfrey
- Starke Herzen (1937) – Ilse
- The Muzzle (1938) – Dame beim Verhör
- The Marriage Swindler (1938) – Frau Buschko
- Youth (1938) – Maruschka
- A Girl Goes Ashore (1938) – Erna Quandt
- Unsere kleine Frau (1938)
- Mia moglie si diverte (1938) – (uncredited)
- The False Step (1939) – Marietta Tripelli
- The Merciful Lie (1939) – Vera Holster
- Robert Koch (1939) – Baronin von Kossin
- Die unheimlichen Wünsche (1939) – Blanchette, Besitzerin einer Schenke
- The Fox of Glenarvon (1940) – Brigit Erskynne
- Trenck the Pandur (1940) – Natalie Alexandrowa Fürstin Solojew
- Ohm Krüger (1941) – Frau Kock
- The Great King (1942) – Spiller's Wife
- Between Heaven and Earth (1942) – Wirtin
- Rembrandt (1942) – Geertje Dierks
- Liebesgeschichten (1943) – Fräulein Klehps
- An Old Heart Becomes Young Again (1943) – Heinrichs Frau Jenny Hoffmann
- Romance in a Minor Key (1943) – Doorkeeper's wife
- Die beiden Schwestern (1943) – Gräfin Holstein
- The Buchholz Family (1944) – Kathinka Bergfeldt
- Marriage of Affection (1944) – Kathinka Bergfeldt
- Seinerzeit zu meiner Zeit (1944) – Frau Revisor
- Philharmonic (1944) – Fuchs, Konzertagentin
- Der Mann, dem man den Namen stahl (1944) – Hella
- Meine Herren Söhne (1945) – Frau Suhrmöller, Wirtschafterin
- Shiva und die Galgenblume (1945)
- Eine große Liebe (1949) – Die Barfrau
- Madonna in Chains (1949) – Gabriele Custodis
- King for One Night (1950) – Wilma
- A Rare Lover (1950) – Madame Laroche
- Toxi (1952) – Tante Wally
- The Day Before the Wedding (1952) – Frau Plitzka
- Hocuspocus (1953) – Zeugin Kiebutz
- The Night Without Morals (1953) – Martha, Abruzzos verlassene Frau
- Wedding Bells (1954) – Valesca Lautenschläger
- The Perfect Couple (1954) – Baronin Windschildt, Heiratsvermittlerin
- Ein toller Tag (1954) – Marzelline, Housekeeper
- Captain Wronski (1954) – Jadwiga, seine Schwester
- The Spanish Fly (1955) – Helene
- Son Without a Home (1955) – Anna Hartmann
- King in Shadow (1957) – Queen Juliane
- The Girl and the Legend (1957) – Miss Hackett
- Scampolo (1958) – Marietta
- Resurrection (1958) – Agrafena
- Stefanie (1958) – Wirtschafterin Frau Hantke
- Wir Wunderkinder (1958) – Mary Meisegeier
- Labyrinth (1959) – Frau Gretzer
- Mrs. Warren's Profession (1960) – Kitty Warrens Mutter
- The Terrible People (1960) – Mrs. Revelstoke
- Faust (1960) – Marthe Schwerdtlein
- Die Brücke des Schicksals (1960) – Frau Kossitzki
- Agatha, Stop That Murdering! (1960) – Sylvia Brent, seine Tante
- Aurora Marriage Bureau (1962) – Hortense Edle von Padula
- Doctor Sibelius (1962) – Helene Sebald
- The Inn on the River (1962) – Nelly Oaks
- Black-White-Red Four Poster (1962) – Arabelle, Jean Tante und Vertraute
- The Indian Scarf (1963) – Lady Emily Lebanon
- Ferien vom Ich (1963) – Gräfin Zita
- And So to Bed (1963) – Ältere Dame
- The Phantom of Soho (1964) – Joanna Filiati
- Dog Eat Dog (1964) – Lady Xenia
- Tales of a Young Scamp (1964) – Tante Frieda
- DM-Killer (1965) – Charly's Mother
- Un milliard dans un billard (1965) – Madame Ralton
- Aunt Frieda (1965) – Tante Frieda
- Onkel Filser – Allerneueste Lausbubengeschichten (1966) – Tante Frieda
- The Liar and the Nun (1967) – the Abbess
- When Ludwig Goes on Manoeuvres (1967) – Aunt Frieda
- Der Tod läuft hinterher (1967, TV Mini-Series) – Edna Stone
- Dr. med. Fabian – Lachen ist die beste Medizin (1969) – Oberschwester Esmeralda
- Captain Typhoon (1971) – Lady Scarlett
- When Mother Went on Strike (1974) – Tante Clarissa Habinger
- Undine 74 (1974) – Nixe Aja
- MitGift (1976) – Frau Burgmann – Edgar's mother
- Golden Night (1976) – Anna, la mère de Michel (final film role)
