= Hit Parade 1960 =

1960 film

- Directed by: Franz Marischka
- Written by: Franz Marischka; F.M. Schilder
- Produced by: Carl Szokoll
- Starring: Renate Ewert; Werner Fullerer; Hilde Nocker
- Cinematography: Dieter Wedekind
- Edited by: Ilse Wilken
- Music by: Gert Wilden
- Production company: Tele Film
- Distributed by: Prisma Film
- Release date: 5 April 1960
- Running time: 101 minutes
- Country: West Germany
- Language: German

Hit Parade 1960 (German: Schlagerparade 1960) is a 1960 West German musical film directed by Franz Marischka and starring Renate Ewert, Werner Fullerer and Hilde Nocker.

== Cast ==
- Renate Ewert as Susanne Grosser
- Vivi Bach as Ulla
- Rex Gildo as Rex Gildo
- Walter Gross as Oskar
- Kurt Großkurth as Mr. Klein
- Thomas Alder as Peter Axtmann
- Eddi Arent as Dixi Dolant
- Hugo Lindinger as Mr. Grosser
- Gerti Gordon as Hanni
- Gabriele Adam as Maxi
- Bill Ramsey as Singer
- Ted Herold as Singer
- Dany Mann as Singer
- Jimmy Makulis as Singer
- Angèle Durand as Singer
- Billy Mo as Singer
- Laurie London as Singer
- Gitte Hænning as Singer
- Detlef Engel as Singer
- Camillo Felgen as Singer
- Nilsen Brothers as Singers
- Billy Sanders as Singer
- Claus Herwig as Singer
- Vera Fischer as Singer
- The Hazy Osterwald-Sextett as Singers
- Max Greger with his big band
- Fredy Brock as Trumpeter
- Werner Fullerer as Host
- Hilde Nocker as Host
- Rainer Bertram as himself
- Heidi Brühl as herself
- Wyn Hoop as himself
- Gitta Lind as herself
- Rudi Palme as Sänger
- Tony Sandler as himself
- Gerd Ströhl as himself
- Gerhard Wendland as himself
- Nina Westen as herself

== Bibliography ==
- Parish, Robert. Film Actors Guide. Scarecrow Press, 1977.
