= Ich suche Dich =

1956 film

- Film poster
- Directed by: O. W. Fischer
- Written by: A. J. Cronin (play); O.W. Fischer; Claus Hardt; Gerhard Menzeli; Martin Morlock
- Produced by: Conrad von Molo
- Starring: O.W. Fischer; Anouk Aimée; Nadja Tiller; Otto Brüggemann
- Cinematography: Richard Angst
- Edited by: Margot von Schlieffen
- Music by: Hans-Martin Majewski
- Distributed by: Aura Producciones
- Release date: 24 February 1956
- Running time: 95 minutes
- Country: West Germany
- Language: German

Ich suche Dich (French title: L’amour ne meurt jamais), is a 1956 West German film based on the 1940 play Jupiter Laughs by A. J. Cronin. It is directed by O. W. Fischer, who also stars in the film, and also features Anouk Aimée, Nadja Tiller, and Otto Brüggemann. Seeleiten Castle in Murnau, Bavaria served as one of the filming locations.

== Cast ==
- O. W. Fischer as Dr. Paul Venner
- Anouk Aimée as Francoise Maurer
- Nadja Tiller as Gaby Brugg
- Otto Brüggeman as Dr. Brugg
- Paul Bildt as Dr. Drews
- Peter-Timm Schaufuß as Dr. Durchgutt
- Hilde Wagener as Senior Nurse Fanny
- Robert Meyn as Appel
- Ursula Herion as Jenny
- Anton Tiller as Baron Greiler
- Eva Klein-Donath as Frau Konsulin
- Hermann Erhardt as Patient Forster
- Franziska Liebing as Frau Forster
- Harriet Geßner as Nurse Anna

== Awards ==
- At the 1957 San Sebastián International Film Festival, O.W. Fischer was the recipient of the Silver Seashell and the OCIC Award.

== See also ==
- Shining Victory (1941)
