= Kein Mann zum Heiraten =

- Directed by: Hans Deppe
- Written by: Janne Furch (writer) & Wolf Neumeister (writer); Wolf Neumeister (story) (uncredited)
- Produced by: Heinz Pollak (producer); Rudolf Stering (executive producer)
- Starring: See below
- Cinematography: Sepp Ketterer
- Edited by: Renate Jelinek
- Music by: Carl Loubé
- Distributed by: Constantin Film
- Release date: 1959
- Running time: 95 minutes
- Country: Austria
- Language: German

Kein Mann zum Heiraten ("No Man to Marry") is a 1959 Austrian film directed by Hans Deppe.

== Cast ==
- Hans-Joachim Kulenkampff as Wolf Kruse
- Marianne Hold as Brigitte Voss
- Elfie von Kalckreuth as Renate Hammerschmidt
- Friedl Czepa as Therese Hammerschmidt
- Johanna König as Annaberta Frühling
- Thomas Alder as Robert 'Bobby' Berger
- Walter Gross as Baupolizist
- Kurt Großkurth as Leo Hammerschmidt
- Paul Hoffmann as Karl Kruse
- Franz Muxeneder as Seppl
- Beppo Brem as Xaver Kirchmeyer
- Walter Buschhoff as Sizilianer
- Herbert Kersten
- Ernst Waldbrunn as Detektiv
- Heide Alrun
- Helmi Mareich
- Else Rambausek

Ted Herold, Bill Ramsey, Jan Wennick and Kjeld Wennick appear uncredited.

== Soundtrack ==
- Bill Ramsey - "Souvernirs, Souvenirs" (Music by Werner Scharfenberger, lyrics by Fini Büsch)
- Jan Wennick and Kjeld Wennick - "Mach doch nicht immer soviel Wind" (Music by Werner Scharfenberger, lyrics by Fini Büsch)
- Jan Wennick and Kjeld Wennick - "Banjo-Boy" (Music by Werner Scharfenberger, lyrics by Fini Büsch)
- Ted Herold - "Carolin" (Music by Werner Scharfenberger, lyrics by Fini Büsch)
