= Angèle Durand =

Belgian singer and actress (1925–2001)

Angèle Caroline Liliane Josette Marie-José DeGeest
- Born: 23 October 1925; Antwerp
- Died: 22 December 2001 (aged 76); Augsburg
- Known for: Singing and Acting

Angèle Caroline Liliane Josette Marie-José DeGeest (Antwerp 23 October 1925 – Augsburg 22 December 2001) was a Belgian singer and actress. Durand was a popular singer in Germany during the early 1950s.

== Filmography ==
- Captain Bay-Bay (1953)
- Dancing in the Sun (1954)
- A Girl from Paris (1954)
- The Mistress of Solderhof (1955)
- Sin Began with Eve (1958) (American re-edited version 1962: The Bellboy and the Playgirls)
- Der lachende Vagabund (1958)
- Das Nachtlokal zum Silbermond (Five Sinners, 1959)
- Hula-Hopp, Conny (1959)
- The Scarlet Baroness (1959)
- Hit Parade 1960 (1960)
- The Mystery of the Green Spider (1960)
- O sole mio (1960)
- Don't Fool with Me (1963)
- I'm an Antistar (1976) by Rosa von Praunheim
