= Mikosch of the Secret Service =

1959 film

- German: Mikosch im Geheimdienst
- Directed by: Franz Marischka; Franz Josef Gottlieb
- Written by: F.M. Schilder; Franz Marischka
- Produced by: Herbert Gruber
- Starring: Gunther Philipp; Kurt Großkurth; Walter Gross
- Cinematography: Werner M. Lenz
- Edited by: Paula Dvorak
- Music by: Hans Hagen
- Production companies: Lux-Film; Sascha-Verleih
- Distributed by: Constantin Film (Austria); Prisma Film (Germany)
- Release date: 27 February 1959 (West Germany)
- Running time: 87 minutes
- Country: Austria
- Language: German

Mikosch of the Secret Service (German: Mikosch im Geheimdienst) is a 1959 Austrian comedy film directed by Franz Marischka and Franz Josef Gottlieb and starring Gunther Philipp, Kurt Großkurth and Walter Gross. It is the sequel to the 1958 West German film Mikosch, the Pride of the Company.

== Plot ==
Ferdinand Mikosch and Otto Schummrich, like the young Susi Lindinger, Ferdinand's girlfriend, belong to Max Sperling's small theater troupe. Ferdinand is always jealous of Susi and soon she has enough of it. She refuses to perform, and Max's friend Fanny, who is actually responsible for the kitchen, jumps in spontaneously and annoys the audience with her singing. Next, the female dance trio drop out because Max has not paid them their wages for a long time. When Ferdinand, Otto and Max jump in, the audience riot and trash the theater. Susi in turn quits. This pleases the Rittmeister Gustl von Schöndorn, who recruits Susi as an agent: The Austrian Gustl, together with the Prussian Major Claus Dieter Graf Schnackewitz and the Russian Colonel Fedor Fedorowitsch Ganiew, have been commissioned by the Austrian chief of the Wedel secret service, their respective rulers for the historic three to protect the Emperor's meeting in Ischl. Gustl distrusts Ganiew and Susi is supposed to secretly shadow the colonel. She wins his trust as a maid and is taken to Ischl after some time.

In the meantime, Gustl and his superior Colonel Ferdinand von Weißenburg-Schwarzeneck are developing an emergency plan, which they call the “Mikosch Plan”. For this three men are necessary and so Ferdinand, Otto and Max are brought to Ischl, where they are supposed to give a guest appearance. Instead, the three let themselves be seduced by the barrack's charms and voluntarily join the regiment. Here they meet Susi, but also Fanny, who is now cooking for the regiment. Not knowing that they are part of a larger plan, they let the soldier Wokurka torment him for days. Only when they want to escape secretly does Gustl initiate them into his plan. They should play their part in the security of the three heads of state. First, however, they climb up to waiters.

Wokurka has the three men thrown into the barrack prison when he meets them again. However, the three flee to their wives. Max, however, who has fallen in love with the barrack doctor, hides in her treatment room. So he gets to know how the doctor talks to Ganiew and both discuss their plan to kill the heads of state in more detail. The doctor hands Ganiew a bomb, which is built into an alarm clock and should only explode shortly after the alarm clock rings. Max tells the others about the plan and the bomb, which in turn hears Ganiew. He secretly exchanges the alarm clock so that Susi brings the wrong alarm clock to the others. The attempt to bring the alarm clock back to Ganiew fails: Susi is captured by Ganiew and the doctor. Ferdinand, Otto and Max examine further alarm clocks, but Ganiew has long since brought the original back into his possession. Only now is the “Mikosch plan” coming into force. Ferdinand, Otto and Max dress up as the three heads of state and appear at a reception. Ganiew activates the bomb, but it does no more damage. Ganiew and the doctor are arrested and Susi, who was under her control, can be released unharmed.

== Cast ==
- Gunther Philipp as Ferdinand Mikosch
- Kurt Großkurth as Otto Schummrich
- Walter Gross as Max Sperling
- Renate Ewert as Susi Lindinger
- Eddi Arent as Major Claus Dieter Graf Schnackewitz
- Joseph Egger as Oberst Wedel - Geheimdienst-Chef
- Harry Friedauer as Rittmeister Gustl von Schöndorn
- Johanna König as Fanny
- Franz Muxeneder as Wokurka
- Hans Olden as Oberst Ferdinand von Weißenburg-Schwarzeneck
- Elfie von Kalckreuth as Christine, seine Nichte
- Helmut Qualtinger as Oberst Fedor Fedorowitsch Ganiew
- Raoul Retzer as Gefreiter

== Bibliography ==
- Robert Dassanowsky. Austrian Cinema: A History. McFarland, 2005.
