= Mandolins and Moonlight =

1959 film

- Directed by: Hans Deppe
- Written by: Franz Marischka; Maria von der Osten-Sacken
- Produced by: Alfred Bittins
- Starring: Christine Görner; Claus Biederstaedt; Johanna König
- Cinematography: Hans Schneeberger
- Edited by: Johanna Meisel
- Music by: Eric Hein
- Production company: Arca-Filmproduktion
- Distributed by: Constantin Film
- Release date: 27 August 1959
- Running time: 98 minutes
- Country: West Germany
- Language: German

Mandolins and Moonlight (German: Mandolinen und Mondschein) is a 1959 West German musical romance film directed by Hans Deppe and starring Christine Görner, Claus Biederstaedt and Johanna König.

It was shot in studios in Berlin and on location in Venice. The film's sets were designed by the art director Ernst H. Albrecht.

== Cast ==
- Christine Görner as Susanne Peters
- Claus Biederstaedt as Robert Küfner
- Johanna König as Schwester Gisela
- Kurt Großkurth as Direktor Ferdinand Küfner
- Monika Dahlberg as Zimmermädchen Trudi
- Walter Gross as Max Krank
- Nina van Pallandt as Karin Gustafsson
- Frederik van Pallandt as Sven
- Harry Friedauer
- Herbert Hübner
- Alexander Engel
- Rex Gildo

== Bibliography ==
- Manfred Hobsch. Liebe, Tanz und 1000 Schlagerfilme. Schwarzkopf & Schwarzkopf, 1998.
