= Alfred Bittins =

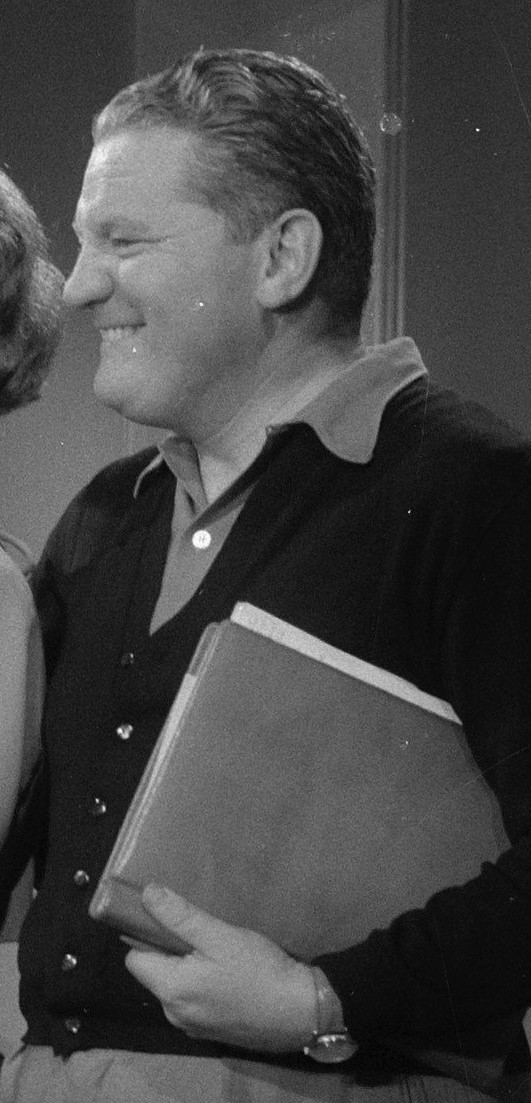
- Alfred Bittins in 1957.
- Born: 7 October 1909; Berlin, German Empire
- Died: 24 November 1970 (aged 61); West Berlin, West Germany
- Occupations: Film producer Film director
- Years active: 1935–1967 (director)

Alfred Bittins (1909 – 1970) was a German film producer and production manager. He also co-directed the 1959 film Jenny.

== Selected filmography ==
- Frisians in Peril (1935)
- Comrades at Sea (1938)
- Fools in the Snow (1938)
- It Began at Midnight (1951)
- The Confession of Ina Kahr (1954)
- Heroism after Hours (1955)
- Lost Child 312 (1955)
- The Model Husband (1956)
- I'll Carry You in My Arms (1958)
- Mandolins and Moonlight (1959)
- Jenny (1959)
- The Post Has Gone (1962)
- Tomfoolery in Zell am See (1963)
- River of Evil (1963)
- Lana, Queen of the Amazons (1964)

== Bibliography ==
- Giesen, Rolf. Nazi Propaganda Films: A History and Filmography. McFarland & Company, 2003.
