= Tomfoolery in Zell am See =

1963 West German comedy film

- Directed by: Franz Marischka
- Written by: Madeleine Sulek
- Produced by: Alfred Bittins
- Starring: Adrian Hoven; Hannelore Elsner; Ingrid van Bergen
- Cinematography: Manfred Ensinger
- Edited by: Anneliese Artelt
- Music by: Christian Bruhn
- Production company: Piran Film
- Distributed by: Piran Film
- Release date: 23 August 1963
- Running time: 89 minutes
- Country: West Germany
- Language: German

Tomfoolery in Zell am See (German: Allotria in Zell am See) is a 1963 West German comedy film directed by Franz Marischka and starring Adrian Hoven, Hannelore Elsner and Ingrid van Bergen. It was shot in Agfacolor with extensive location shooting around the resort town of Zell am See in the Kitzbühel Alps.The film's sets were designed by the art director Johannes Ott.

== Cast ==
- Adrian Hoven as Mark Fürberg
- Hannelore Elsner as Sylvia Brückner
- Ingrid van Bergen as Dolly Barsen
- Evi Kent as Annamürl
- Ellen Umlauf as Frau Generaldirektor van der Meeren
- Petra von der Linde as Antje van der Meeren
- Hubert von Meyerinck as Hauptmann Hans Hajo von Gestern
- Franz Muxeneder as Ladislaus
- Beppo Brem as Alois
- Michl Lang as Gendarm
- Harald Juhnke as Pit Tanner

== Bibliography ==
- Bock, Hans-Michael & Bergfelder, Tim. The Concise CineGraph. Encyclopedia of German Cinema. Berghahn Books, 2009.
- Straub, Wolfgang. Willkommen: Literatur und Fremdenverkehr in Österreich. Sonderzahl, 2001.
- Strasser, Christian. The Sound of Klein-Hollywood: Filmproduktion in Salzburg, Salzburg im Film : mit einem Filmlexikon. Österreichischer Kunst- und Kulturverlag, 1993.
