= Jupiter Laughs =

1940 play by A. J. Cronin

- Written by: A. J. Cronin

Premiere
- Date: March 4, 1940
- Place: King's Theatre, Glasgow

Jupiter Laughs
- Author: A. J. Cronin
- Language: English
- Genre: Play
- Publisher: Gollancz (UK); Little, Brown (US)
- Publication date: 1940
- Publication place: United Kingdom
- Media type: Print (Hardback & Paperback)
- Pages: 190
- OCLC: 1498417

Jupiter Laughs is A. J. Cronin's 1940 play in three acts about a doctor who falls in love with a colleague—a woman doctor who plans to become a medical missionary. The play was first staged in Glasgow at the King's Theatre and starred Henry Longhurst, Catherine Lacey and James Mason. In September 1940, it opened on Broadway at the Biltmore Theatre and starred Alexander Knox and Jessica Tandy. Film adaptations include Shining Victory, with James Stephenson and Geraldine Fitzgerald, and Ich suche Dich ("I Seek You") with O.W. Fischer and Anouk Aimée.

== Reception ==
Brooks Atkinson panned the play in his September 10, 1940, review in The New York Times, criticizing the work itself and its realization. "Dr. Cronin…is all thumbs in the theater… the story is maudlin and the characters cut out of colored cardboard. If the drama has any interior meaning, it does not penetrate the mechanical performance that Reginald Denham has directed."

== Adaptations ==
Shining Victory, a 1941 Warner Bros. film starring James Stephenson and Geraldine Fitzgerald, is based on Jupiter Laughs.
