= Mikosch, the Pride of the Company =

1958 film

- Directed by: Rudolf Schündler
- Written by: F. M. Schilder; Franz Marischka
- Produced by: Jochen Genzow
- Starring: Gunther Philipp; Walter Gross; Kurt Großkurth
- Cinematography: Werner M. Lenz
- Edited by: Adolf Schlyssleder
- Music by: Gert Wilden
- Production company: Regina-Film
- Distributed by: Prisma Film
- Release date: 28 February 1958
- Running time: 95 minutes
- Country: West Germany
- Language: German

Mikosch, the Pride of the Company (German: Mikosch, der Stolz der Kompanie) is a 1958 West German comedy film directed by Rudolf Schündler and starring Gunther Philipp, Walter Gross, and Kurt Großkurth. It was followed by the 1959 sequel Mikosch of the Secret Service.

== Cast ==
- Gunther Philipp as Ferdinand Mikosch
- Walter Gross as Max Sperling
- Kurt Großkurth as Otto Schummrich
- Renate Ewert as Susi Lindinger
- Erwin Strahl as Leutnant Franz von Hohenstein
- Helga Frank as Comtesse Christine
- Steffi Stroux as Ottilie von Drachwitz
- Johanna König as Köchin Fanny
- Franz Muxeneder as Wokurka
- Hans Olden as Oberst Franz Joseph von Weißenburg-Schwarzeneck
- Rolf Olsen as Feldwebel Blaha
- Karl Lieffen as Stabsarzt
- Peter Wehle as Theaterleiter
- Rolf Döring
- Harry Kupetz
- Annie Rosar as Oberschwester Gräfin Cäcillie Blutowitz
- Paul Westermeier as Oberst Wilhelm von Drachwitz
- Lotte Werkmeister as Josephine von Drachwitz

== Bibliography ==
- Maier, Margit (2009). Das Geschäft mit den Träumen: Kinokultur in Würzburg (in German). Würzburg: Königshausen & Neumann. ISBN 978-3-8260-4115-0.
