= Johannes Ott =

German art director

- Born: 19 September 1919; Berlin, Germany
- Died: 24 April 1995 (aged 75); Berlin, Germany
- Occupation: Art director
- Years active: 1954 - 1974 (film & TV)

Johannes Ott (1919–1995) was a German art director known for his work in the country's film industry. In the early stages of his career he collaborated frequently with the veteran set designer Erich Kettelhut.

== Selected filmography ==
- Prisoners of Love (1954)
- A Love Story (1954)
- Three Days Confined to Barracks (1955)
- Children, Mother, and the General (1955)
- Three Girls from the Rhine (1955)
- One Woman Is Not Enough? (1955)
- Das Mädchen Marion (1956)
- Made in Germany (1957)
- Night Nurse Ingeborg (1958)
- The Muzzle (1958)
- The Man Who Sold Himself (1959)
- The Thousand Eyes of Dr. Mabuse (1960)
- Until Money Departs You (1960)
- Storm in a Water Glass (1960)
- Girl from Hong Kong (1961)
- The Post Has Gone (1962)
- Life Begins at Eight (1962)
- Freddy and the Song of the South Pacific (1963)
- The Lightship (1963)
- Tomfoolery in Zell am See (1963)
- The Pirates of the Mississippi (1963)
- If You Go Swimming in Tenerife (1964)
- The Body in the Thames (1971)

== Bibliography ==
- David Kalat. The Strange Case of Dr. Mabuse: A Study of the Twelve Films and Five Novels. McFarland, 2015.
