= George Robotham =

American actor and football player (1921–2007)

- George Robotham in The Goonies
- Born: January 10, 1921; Sacramento, California, U.S.
- Died: February 1, 2007 (aged 86); Bonn, Germany
- Occupations: Actor, stuntman
- Years active: 1943–2000
- Spouse: Karin Dor (1988–2007; his death)

George Robotham (January 10, 1921 – February 1, 2007) was an American stuntman and actor.

Robotham was born in 1921 and played American football at UCLA, where he was awarded a degree in business administration. He started his acting career as a stuntman and actor in Batman.

Following his role in Batman, he usually appeared as an uncredited role in many movies where he was also doing stunts. He was probably best known as the human sacrifice in The Prodigal. He also made appearances in historical films such as Joan of Arc, The Robe, Disney's The Great Locomotive Chase, The Ten Commandments and Spartacus.

Robotham was reported dead on February 1, 2007, from complications of Alzheimer's disease. He was married to German actress Karin Dor. He died in Bonn, Germany, at the age of 86.

== Partial filmography ==
- 1943 Batman (Serial) as Henchman (uncredited)
- 1943 Destination Tokyo as Crewman (uncredited)
- 1948 Joan of Arc as English Knight (uncredited)
- 1949 Bride of Vengeance as Assassin (uncredited)
- 1949 Batman and Robin (Serial) as Car 4 Henchman-Driver [Chs. 2-6, 11-12] (uncredited)
- 1950 Cody of the Pony Express (Serial) as Burt (uncredited)
- 1950 Atom Man vs. Superman (Serial) as Earl [Chs. 10-12]
- 1950 Chain Gang as Guard Reagan (uncredited)
- 1950 Last of the Buccaneers as Pirate (uncredited)
- 1951 Mysterious Island (Serial) as Mercurian
- 1951 Captain Video: Master of the Stratosphere (Serial) as Space Platform Operator-Observer [Chs. 4-5] (uncredited)
- 1952 Invitation as Tennis Player (uncredited)
- 1953 Savage Mutiny as Johnson (uncredited)
- 1953 The Robe as Slave With Demetrius At Palm Procession (uncredited)
- 1954 Gunfighters of the Northwest as Constable Evans (uncredited)
- 1954 Seven Brides for Seven Brothers as Town Suitor (uncredited)
- 1955 Many Rivers to Cross as Indian (uncredited)
- 1955 The Prodigal as Human Sacrifice (uncredited)
- 1956 The Great Locomotive Chase as William Knight, Union Civilian Train Engineer / Fireman
- 1956 The Ten Commandments as Attendant (uncredited)
- 1957 The Garment Jungle as Truck Driver (uncredited)
- 1957 The Way to the Gold as Policeman (uncredited)
- 1960 Spartacus as Pirate (uncredited)
- 1962 Mermaids of Tiburon as Dr. Samuel Jamison
- 1968 5 Card Stud as Stoney Burough, Evers' Ranch Hand (uncredited)
- 1968 The Split as Physical Instructor (uncredited)
- 1973 The Don Is Dead as Hood (uncredited)
- 1978 Invisible Strangler as Cemetery Guard
- 1979 The Prisoner of Zenda as (uncredited)
- 1985 The Goonies as Prison Guard
- 1988 Alien Nation as Boat Captain
- 1988 Split Decisions as Thug #2
- 1999 "Thomas Crown" as Driver the Ed final film role
