= People in the Net =

1959 film

- Directed by: Franz Peter Wirth
- Written by: Herbert Reinecker; Will Tremper (novel)
- Produced by: Hans Abich
- Starring: Hansjörg Felmy; Johanna von Koczian; Hannes Messemer
- Cinematography: Günther Senftleben
- Edited by: Claus von Boro
- Music by: Hans-Martin Majewski
- Production company: Bavaria Film
- Distributed by: Bavaria Film
- Release date: 23 July 1959
- Running time: 95 minutes
- Country: West Germany
- Language: German

People in the Net (German: Menschen im Netz), also known as Unwilling Agent, is a 1959 West German Cold War spy film directed by Franz Peter Wirth and starring Hansjörg Felmy, Johanna von Koczian and Hannes Messemer.

The film's sets were designed by the art directors Franz Bi and Max Seefelder. It was shot at the Bavaria Studios in Munich.

== Cast ==
- Hansjörg Felmy as Klaus Martens
- Johanna von Koczian as Gitta Martens
- Hannes Messemer as Braun
- Ingeborg Schöner as Marianne Gardella
- Rosl Schäfer as Daisy Winter
- Hanns Lothar as Stefan
- Gernot Duda as Janos
- Klaus Havenstein as Beamter
- Peter Lühr as Dr. Becker
- Walter Sedlmayr
- Willy Semmelrogge as Lauer
- Olga von Togni as Olga Hajek
- Max Mairich as Fischer
- Alexander Hunzinger as Wagentritt
- Paul Verhoeven as Karel
- Helmut Brasch as Grasdorffer
- Ettore Cella as Luigi Gardella
- Gerhard Just as Herr Liebermann
- Rolf Kralovitz as Berger
- Franziska Liebing as Frau Liebermann
- Anton Reimer as Kriminal-Inspektor

== Bibliography ==
- Bock, Hans-Michael & Bergfelder, Tim. The Concise CineGraph. Encyclopedia of German Cinema. Berghahn Books, 2009.
