= Karin Dor =

German actress (1938–2017)

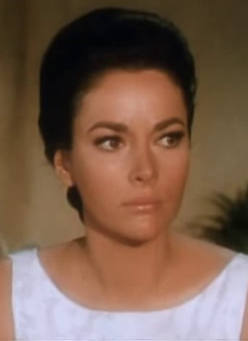
- Dor in Topaz (1969)
- Born: Kätherose Derr; 22 February 1938; Wiesbaden, Hesse, Germany
- Died: 6 November 2017 (aged 79); Munich, Germany
- Occupation: Actress
- Years active: 1953–2017
- Spouses: Harald Reinl (m. 1954; div. 1968); Günther Schmucker (m. 1972; div. 1974); George Robotham (m. 1988; died 2007)
- Children: 1

Karin Dor (pronounced [ˈkaːʁiːn ˈdoːɐ̯]; born Kätherose Derr; 22 February 1938 – 6 November 2017) was a German actress. She was known domestically for her roles in various film adaptations of Karl May and Edgar Wallace novels, and internationally for her portrayal of Bond girl Helga Brandt in the James Bond film You Only Live Twice (1967).

== Biography ==
Dor was born in Wiesbaden on 22 February 1938. She starred in the James Bond movie You Only Live Twice (1967) and the Alfred Hitchcock movie Topaz (1969).

She appeared in German movies adapted from the works of Edgar Wallace (Krimis from Kriminalfilm) and Karl May. These film series were mainly directed by Harald Reinl, her first husband.

In 2008, she was in a Munich stage production, Man liebt nur dreimal (You Only Love Thrice). In later years, she performed mainly stage roles but still appeared in some films.

She was married three times: her last marriage was to George Robotham, an American stunt director, from 1988 until his death in 2007. The couple lived in Los Angeles and Munich. Her previous marriage was to Harald Reinl (1954–68); the couple had a child. In 1954, the year of their marriage, Dor was 16 years old (born 1938), while Reinl was 46 (born 1908).

== Accident and death ==
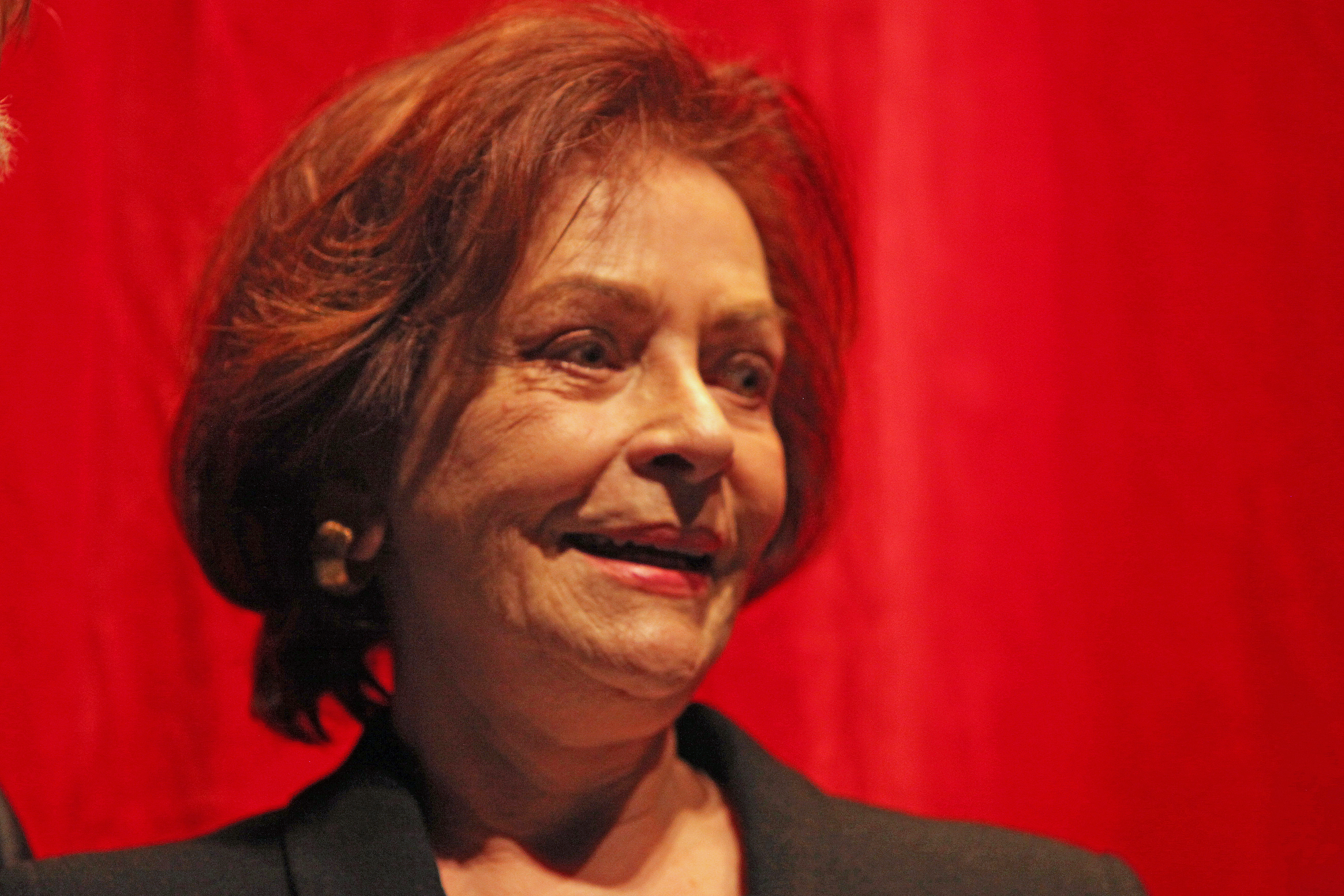
Dor at the 2015 Berlin Film Festival

In July 2016, while vacationing in South Tyrol, Dor was knocked to the ground after being accidentally rammed by a woman with a pushchair. The backwards fall onto concrete resulted in a gashing 4-cm head wound that had to be stitched in hospital. She lost her memory for the duration of an hour.

According to Dor, the doctors detected neither a brain concussion nor an intracranial injury. Only during rehearsals for the theatre play Der Dressierte Mann weeks after her fall did doctors realize her injuries were more serious than previously thought, as she began suffering from headaches and was often tired. Even months past the accident, the aftereffects were still present and Dor was not feeling up to her usual energetic self. Her attitude however remained positive and, despite her doctors advising against it, she continued working as an actress. Between October and November 2016, she appeared on stage every evening performing at the Komödie im Bayerischen Hof in Munich. By that time, she was already experiencing limited motor function in her right leg.

Suddenly, in January 2017, she relapsed. Her condition rapidly worsened in March 2017 and she was confined to a care home, where she ultimately died on 6 November, aged 79.

== Selected filmography ==
- The Last Waltz (1953) as Extra (uncredited)
- Roses from the South (1954)
- Rose-Girl Resli (1954)
- The Great Test (1954)
- The Silent Angel (1954) as Erika
- Ihre große Prüfung (1955) as Elena Clausen
- As Long as You Live (1955) as Pepita
- Santa Lucia (1956) as Manina
- Kleiner Mann – ganz groß (1957) as Meike Brauns
- The Twins from Zillertal (1957) as Daniela Kleemann
- Almenrausch and Edelweiss (1957) as Maresi Meier
- Sin Began with Eve (1958) as Dinah
- Worüber man nicht spricht (1958) as Christa Riek
- Thirteen Old Donkeys (1958) as Monika
- Skandal um Dodo (1959) as Helga, die Nichte
- The Blue Sea and You (1959) as Helga Heidebrink
- A Summer You Will Never Forget (1959) as Christine von Auffenberg
- That's No Way to Land a Man (1959) as Tessy
- The Terrible People (1960) as Nora Sanders
- The White Horse Inn (1960) as Brigitte Giesecke
- The Green Archer (1960) as Valerie Howett, geb Bellamy
- Pichler's Books Are Not in Order (1961) as Anneliese
- The Forger of London (1961) as Jane Clifton, geb. Leith
- Am Sonntag will mein Süsser mit mir segeln geh'n (1961) as Georgie Hagen, die Sprachstudentin
- Im schwarzen Rößl (1961) as Eva Lantz
- The Bellboy and the Playgirls (1962, footage from Sin Began with Eve)
- The Invisible Dr. Mabuse (1962) as Liane Martin
- The Carpet of Horror (1962) as Ann Learner
- Treasure of Silver Lake (1962) as Ellen Patterson
- The White Spider (1963) as Muriel Irvine
- The Strangler of Blackmoor Castle (1963) as Claridge Dorsett
- The Secret of the Black Widow (1963) as Clarisse
- Room 13 (1964) as Denise
- Last of the Renegades (1964) as Ribanna
- Hotel of Dead Guests (1965) as Gilly Powell
- The Last Tomahawk (1965) as Cora Munroe
- The Face of Fu Manchu (1965) as Maria Muller
- The Desperado Trail (1965)
- I Knew Her Well (1965) as Barbara, the lady friend of Adriana
- The Sinister Monk (1965) as Gwendolin
- The Spy with Ten Faces (1966) as Helen Farheit
- Killer's Carnival (1966) as Denise (Rio segment)
- Target for Killing (1966) as Sandra Perkins
- Die Nibelungen: Part 1: Siegfried (1966–1967) as Brunhild
- You Only Live Twice (1967) as Helga Brandt / No.24
- The Blood Demon (1967) as Baroness Lilian von Brabant
- Darling Caroline (1968) as Isabelle de Loigny
- The Valley of Death (1968) as Mabel Kingsley
- Topaz (1969) as Juanita de Cordoba
- Los Monstruos del Terror (1970) as Maleva Kerstein
- Sharks on Board (1971) as Andrea Jacobs
- Only the Wind Knows the Answer (1974) as Nicole Monnier
- Warhead (1977) as Liora
- Women in Hospital (1977) as Claudias Mutter
- Dark Echo (1977) as Lisa Bruekner
- Johann Strauss: The King Without a Crown (1987) as Jetty
- I Am the Other Woman (2006) as Frau Winter
- The Misplaced World (2015) as Rosa (final film role)
