= Ludwig II (1955 film) =

1955 film directed by Helmut Käutner

- Directed by: Helmut Käutner
- Written by: George Hurdalek; Peter Berneis; Kadidja Wedekind
- Produced by: Wolfgang Reinhardt; Conrad von Molo
- Starring: O.W. Fischer; Ruth Leuwerik; Marianne Koch
- Cinematography: Douglas Slocombe
- Edited by: Anneliese Schönnenbeck
- Music by: Heinrich Sutermeister
- Production company: Aura Film
- Distributed by: Schorcht Filmverleih
- Release date: 14 January 1955
- Running time: 115 minutes
- Country: West Germany
- Language: German

Ludwig II (German: Ludwig II: Glanz und Ende eines Königs) is a 1955 West German historical drama film directed by Helmut Käutner and starring O.W. Fischer, Ruth Leuwerik and Marianne Koch. It is based on the life of the nineteenth century ruler Ludwig II of Bavaria. It was entered into the 1955 Cannes Film Festival. The film was shot in technicolor at the Bavaria Studios in Munich with sets designed by the art director Hein Heckroth and Fritz Lück. Location shooting took place at the historic residences of Ludwig II Herrenchiemsee, Neuschwanstein Castle and Hohenschwangau Castle.

== Plot ==
The young Ludwig II succeeded his father to the Bavarian throne in 1864. His love life was not a happy one, but he was interested in the arts and became friends with Richard Wagner, whose music he adored. Director Käutner illustrates Ludwig II's eventful life: from his engagement to Princess Sophie to his political failure and the monarch's isolation, this film summarises all the important moments of his life.

== Cast ==
- O.W. Fischer as Ludwig II
- Ruth Leuwerik as Elisabeth, Empress of Austria
- Marianne Koch as Princess Sophie
- Paul Bildt as Richard Wagner
- Friedrich Domin as Otto von Bismarck
- Rolf Kutschera as Maximilian von Holnstein
- Herbert Hübner as von Pfistermeister
- Robert Meyn as Professor Dr. Gudden
- Rudolf Fernau as Prince Luitpold von Bayern
- Willy Rösner as Minister von Lutz
- Klaus Kinski as Prince Otto von Bayern
- Fritz Odemar as General von der Tann
- Erik Frey as Emperor Franz Joseph I of Austria
- Albert Johannes as Fürst Hohenfels
- Erica Balqué as Cosima von Bülow
- Walter Regelsberger as Graf Dürckheim
- Hans Quest as Kapellmeister Eckert

== Bibliography ==
- Mitchell, Charles P. The Great Composers Portrayed on Film, 1913 through 2002. McFarland, 2004.
- Reimer, Robert C. & Reimer, Carol J. The A to Z of German Cinema. Scarecrow Press, 2010.
