= O. W. Fischer =

Austrian actor

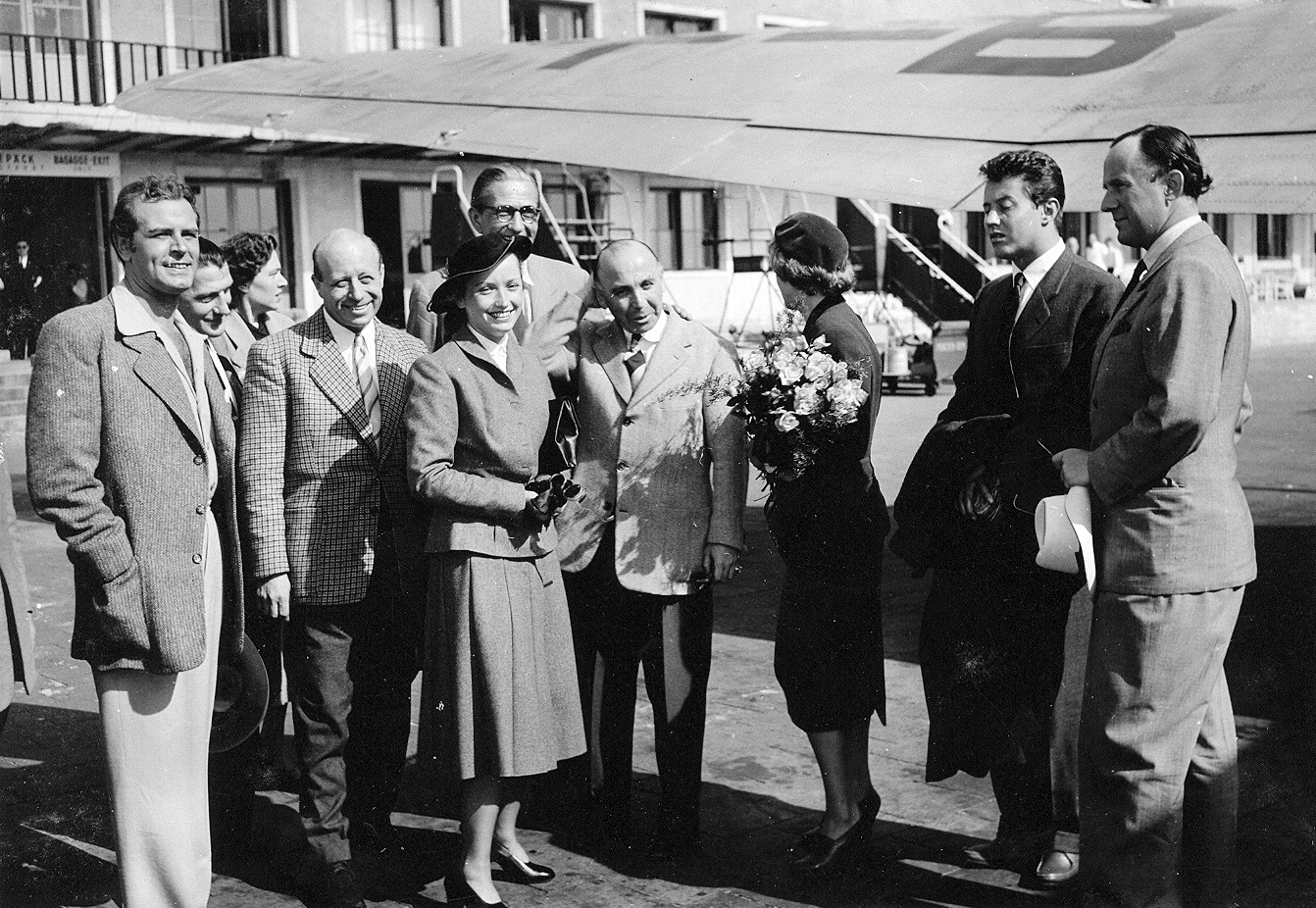
- Fischer (1st from left) with Michel Auclair and Axel von Ambesser (right), Munich-Riem Airport, 1951
- Born: Otto Wilhelm Fischer; 1 April 1915; Klosterneuburg, Lower Austria, Austria-Hungary
- Died: 29 January 2004 (aged 88); Lugano, Switzerland
- Education: University of Vienna
- Occupation: Actor

Otto Wilhelm Fischer (German: O. W. Fischer, pronounced [oː veː ˈfɪʃɐ]; 1 April 1915 – 29 January 2004) was an Austrian film and theatre actor, a leading man of West German cinema during the Wirtschaftswunder era of the 1950s and 1960s.

== Biography ==
He was born in Klosterneuburg near Vienna, where he obtained his Matura degree at the local gymnasium secondary school. Fischer began studying English and German philology and art history at the University of Vienna, in 1936, however, he enlisted at the Max Reinhardt Seminar drama school. He had first engagements as an actor at the Vienna Theater in der Josefstadt, the Munich Kammerspiele, and the Vienna Volkstheater. In 1945 he reached the highpoint of his theatre career when he joined the ensemble of the Burgtheater.

Fischer began filming in 1936, his performance in the 1942 propaganda movie Vienna 1910 earned him an entry on Goebbel's Gottbegnadeten list. He made his breakthrough after the war starring in A Heidelberg Romance and numerous other romance films, often with female co-stars Maria Schell and Ruth Leuwerik.

Fischer enjoyed a great career, but unlike countrymen and -women Oskar Werner, Curd Jürgens, Maria Schell and Romy Schneider, he never made it internationally. Worse, his American break ended before it began: he was signed to star with June Allyson in a remake of My Man Godfrey in 1956, but was fired after 16 days of shooting and replaced by David Niven when Fischer reportedly lost his memory during filming. Fischer directed and starred opposite Anouk Aimée in a 1956 film, Ich suche Dich, based on the play, Jupiter Laughs, by A. J. Cronin. In 1955, he directed and starred in Hanussen, a movie detailing the life of clairvoyant Erik Jan Hanussen. While the film is considered highly romanticized, it assisted historians and biographers in uncovering previously unknown facts. He also starred in the title role of tragic King Ludwig II of Bavaria in the classic German film, Ludwig II: Glanz und Ende eines Königs by Helmut Käutner.

He was hired by the Rank Organisation to star in Whirlpool which was not a success.

In 2021 Senta Berger claimed that O. W. Fischer attempted to rape her in a hotel room during production on It Can't Always Be Caviar (1961)

In the early 1970s, he retired to live in Vernate, Ticino and to concentrate on linguistics and philosophy, on which he lectured and published a number of books. He died in Lugano, Switzerland of kidney failure.

== Selected filmography ==
- Court Theatre (1936) as Schauspieler des Burgtheaters
- Anton the Last (1939) as Graf Willy von Erlenburg
- My Daughter Lives in Vienna (1940) as Chauffeur Karl Ewald Hauser
- Der Meineidbauer (1941) as Franz Ferner
- Sommerliebe (1942) as Franz von Haflinger
- Vienna 1910 (1943) as Karl Lechner
- Die beiden Schwestern (1943) as Andreas Holk
- Sieben Briefe (1944) as Felix Lombard, Author
- Glück unterwegs (1944) as Kapellmeister Florian
- Spiel mit der Liebe (1944) as Dr. Hall
- Leuchtende Schatten (1945)
- Triumph der Liebe (1947) as Agathos
- The Immortal Face (1947) as Anselm Feuerbach
- Hin und her (1948) as René
- Verlorenes Rennen (1948) as Robert Rimml
- Don't Dream, Annette (1949)
- Rosen der Liebe (1949) as König Raoul
- Märchen vom Glück (1949) as Fernando
- Archduke Johann's Great Love (1950) as Erzherzog Johann
- A Tale of Five Cities (1951)
- Dreaming Days (1951) as Florian Faber
- A Heidelberg Romance (1951) as Hans-Joachim, Prinz von Reiningen
- Desires (1952) as Hans Falkner
- A Thousand Red Roses Bloom (1952) as Andreas Mahler
- Ich hab' mich so an Dich gewöhnt (1952) as Dr. Peter Heider – Jurist
- Until We Meet Again (1952) as Paul Mayrhöfer
- Cuba Cabana (1952) as Robby Tomsen
- Dreaming Lips (1953) as Peter
- A Heart Plays False (1953) as Peter van Booven
- As Long as You're Near Me (1953) as Frank Tornau
- Diary of a Married Woman (1953) as Paul Holzmann
- A Love Story (1954) as Jost v. Fredersdorff, Rittmeister
- Portrait of an Unknown Woman (1954) as Jan Maria Keller
- Ludwig II (1955) as Ludwig II
- Napoleon (1955) as Le prince Karl von Metternich
- Hanussen (1955) as Eric Jan Hanussen
- Ich suche Dich (1956) as Dr. Paul Venner
- My Father, the Actor (1956) as Wolfgang Ohlsen
- King in Shadow (1957) as Friedrich Struensee
- Scandal in Bad Ischl (1957) as Dr. Franz Duhr
- El Hakim (1957) as Ibrahim
- … und nichts als die Wahrheit (1958) as Dr. Stefan Donat
- Peter Voss, Thief of Millions (1958) as Peter Voss
- Il bacio del sole (Don Vesuvio) (1958) as Don Mario Borrelli (Don Vesuvio)
- Arms and the Man (1958) as Hauptmann Bluntschli
- Whirlpool (1959) as Rolph
- And That on Monday Morning (1959) as Alois Kessel
- Menschen im Hotel (1959) as Baron Felix von Gaigern
- Rebel Flight to Cuba (1959) as Peter van Houten
- Peter Voss, Hero of the Day (1959) as Peter Voss
- Grounds for Divorce (1960) as Dr. Thomas Werther
- Mit Himbeergeist geht alles besser (1960) as Philipp Kalder
- Das Riesenrad (1961) as Rudolf von Hill
- It Can't Always Be Caviar (1961) as Thomas Lieven
- This Time It Must Be Caviar (1961) as Thomas Lieven
- Axel Munthe, The Doctor of San Michele (1962) as Axel Munthe
- Breakfast in Bed (1963) as Henry Clausen
- The Secret of the Black Widow (1963) as Wellby
- Uncle Tom's Cabin (1965) as Pierre Saint-Claire
- El marqués (1965) as Marquis Antonio de las Nieves
- Geh ins Bett, nicht in den Krieg (1966) as U-Boot-Kommandant Backhaus
- Love Birds (1969) as Il Conte
- Herbst in Lugano (1988, TV film) (final film role)

== Honours and awards ==
- 1950, 1951: Danube females
- 1953–1955: Bambi award
- 1955: Filmband in Silver (best actor) for Ludwig II: Glanz und Ende eines Königs
- 1956 – San Sebastián International Film Festival: Silver shell (Director, actor) for Ich suche Dich
- 1956: Price of Spanish film journalists (screenplay) for Ich suche Dich
- 1958–1961: Bambi award
- 1958–1963: Bravo Otto
- 1959: Filmband in Gold (best actor) for Arms and the Man (film)
- 1960: Austrian Cross of Honour for Science and Art, 1st class
- 1961: Europa Prize for Das Riesenrad
- 1961: Honorary Member of the Association of the Spanish film journalists
- 1970: Appointed Professor
- 1977: Filmband in Gold for long and outstanding achievements in German film
- 1987, 1990: Bambi award
- 1987: Cordon Bleu du Saint Esprit
- 1995: Grand Silver Decoration for Services to the Republic of Austria
- 1996: Grand Gold Decoration for Services to the Republic of Austria
- Grand Merit Cross of the Federal Republic of Germany

== Publications ==
- [-?-]: Auferstehung in Hollywood. Texte, Wien: Österreichische Staatsdruckerei, o.J. ISBN 978-3-7046-0037-0
- 1986: Engelsknabe war ich keiner. Erinnerung an eine Jugend, Munich: Langen Müller ISBN 978-3-7844-2109-4
- 1999: Ferner Klang. Texte, Ulm: Hess ISBN 978-3-87336-000-6
- 2000: Meine Geheimnisse. Erinnerungen und Gedanken, Munich: Langen Müller ISBN 978-3-7844-2770-6
