= The White Spider (1963 film) =

1963 film

- German: Die weiße Spinne
- Directed by: Harald Reinl
- Written by: Egon Eis
- Based on: The White Spider by Louis Weinert-Wilton
- Produced by: Werner M. Lenz; Gero Wecker
- Starring: Joachim Fuchsberger; Karin Dor; Horst Frank
- Cinematography: Werner M. Lenz
- Edited by: Wolfgang Wehrum
- Music by: Peter Thomas
- Production companies: Arca-Winston Films; Hans Oppenheimer Film
- Distributed by: Constantin Film
- Release date: 5 April 1963
- Running time: 103 minutes
- Country: West Germany
- Language: German

The White Spider (German: Die weiße Spinne) is a 1963 West German crime thriller film directed by Harald Reinl and starring Joachim Fuchsberger, Karin Dor and Horst Frank. It is based on a novel of the same name by the Czech writer Louis Weinert-Wilton.

The film's sets were designed by the art director Ernst H. Albrecht. Location shooting took place in London, Hamburg and West Berlin. It was made and promoted to look like a German Edgar Wallace movie, using the same director and several actors from the Wallace film series.

== Plot ==
When Muriel Irvine's husband is killed in an automobile accident after a night of gambling, she discovers that he had previously dramatically increased his life insurance coverage. The insurance company alerts Scotland Yard to a recent rash of such deaths all affecting gamblers. When the Yard's chief inspector is murdered while investigating the case, they bring in a mysterious detective to solve it.

== Cast ==
- Joachim Fuchsberger as Ralph Hubbard
- Karin Dor as Muriel Irvine
- Horst Frank as Kiddie Phelips
- Werner Peters as Sergeant Meals
- Dieter Eppler as Summerfield
- Mady Rahl as Mrs. Falk
- Paul Klinger as Inspector Dawson
- Friedrich Schoenfelder as Sir James
- Lotte Brackebusch as Penelope
- Gerd Frickhöffer as Lord Ensfield
- Chris Howland as Gideon
- Lotti Alberti as Mrs. Pringle
- Hans Bergmann as Stewart Maloney
- Fritz Eberth as Sergeant Gibbs
- Dietrich Kerky as victim
- Erik Radolf as policeman
