= The Post Has Gone =

1962 film by Helmuth M. Backhaus

- Directed by: Helmuth M. Backhaus
- Written by: Helmuth M. Backhaus
- Produced by: Alfred Bittins; Ljubo Struna
- Starring: Vivi Bach; Adrian Hoven; Claus Biederstaedt
- Cinematography: Gerhard Krüger
- Edited by: Anneliese Artelt
- Music by: Christian Bruhn
- Production company: Piran-Film
- Distributed by: Gloria Film
- Release date: 21 September 1962
- Running time: 91 minutes
- Country: West Germany
- Language: German

The Post Has Gone (German: Die Post geht ab) is a 1962 West German musical comedy film directed by Helmuth M. Backhaus and starring Vivi Bach, Adrian Hoven, and Claus Biederstaedt.

The film's sets were designed by the art directors Mirko Lipuzic and Johannes Ott. The film was shot on location in Yugoslavia. The plot centers on a trip to the Adriatic Sea by a group of competition winners.

== Cast ==
- Vivi Bach as Barbi Lothar
- Adrian Hoven as Willy
- Claus Biederstaedt as Harry Eberhardt
- Corny Collins as Gina
- Elma Karlowa as Wilma
- Heinz Erhardt as Walter Eberhardt
- Wolf Albach-Retty as Lukas Lenz
- Gerhard Wendland as Rudolf Lothar
- Margitta Scherr as Anja Stolze
- Gunnar Möller as Franz
- Ilse Steppat as Elfriede Stolze
- Kurt Großkurth as Teutobald Stolze
- Dagmar Hank as Petra Lenz
- Chris Howland as John
- Peter Fröhlich as Till Hartmann
- Ralf Wolter as Herr Ratsam
- Beppo Brem as Sepp
