= Louis Weinert-Wilton =

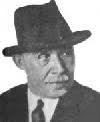
- Born: Alois Weinert; 11 May 1875; Weseritz, Bohemia, Austro-Hungarian Empire
- Died: 4 September 1945; Prague, Czechoslovakia
- Occupation: Writer

Louis Weinert-Wilton, born as Alois Weinert (11 May 1875 – 4 September 1945) was a Sudeten German playwright and novelist.

During the boom in Krimi films in West German cinema during the 1960s, several of his mystery novels were adapted into films due to their similarity with the popular Edgar Wallace series of Rialto Film.

== Filmography ==
- The Carpet of Horror (dir. Harald Reinl, 1962)
- The White Spider (dir. Harald Reinl, 1963)
- The Secret of the Black Widow (dir. Franz Josef Gottlieb, 1963)
- The Secret of the Chinese Carnation (dir. Rudolf Zehetgruber, 1964)

== Bibliography ==
- Goble, Alan. The Complete Index to Literary Sources in Film. Walter de Gruyter, 1999.
