= Johanna König =

German actress

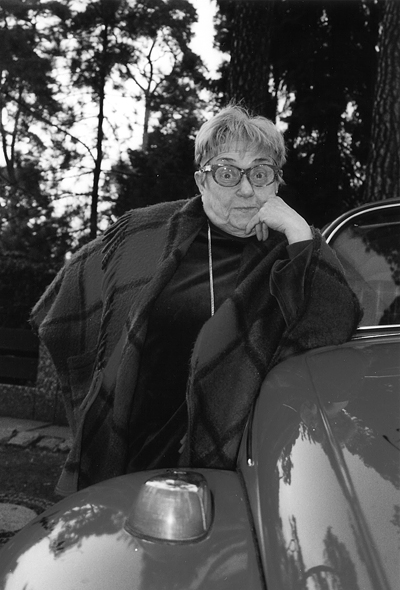
- Born: 27 March 1921; Leipzig, Germany
- Died: 3 March 2009 (aged 87); Berlin, Germany
- Occupation: Actress
- Years active: 1952–1999

Johanna König (27 March 1921 – 3 March 2009) was a German actress. She appeared in more than 50 films and television shows between 1952 and 1999. König was born in Leipzig, Germany and died in Berlin on 3 March 2009.

== Selected filmography ==
- Nights on the Road (1952)
- My Sweetheart Is from Tyrol (1958)
- Munchhausen in Africa (1958)
- Mikosch, the Pride of the Company (1958)
- Kein Mann zum Heiraten (1959)
- Mandolins and Moonlight (1959)
- Mikosch of the Secret Service (1959)
- Conny and Peter Make Music (1960)
- Robert and Bertram (1961)
- When the Music Plays at Wörthersee (1962)
- Come to the Blue Adriatic (1966)
- Hotel Clausewitz (1967)
- Zum Teufel mit der Penne (1968)
- Jane is Jane Forever (1977)
