= Renate Ewert =

German actress

- Born: 9 November 1933
- Died: 4 December 1966 (aged 33)
- Occupation: Actress

Renate Ewert (9 November 1933 in Königsberg, East Prussia, Germany - now Kaliningrad, Russia – 4 December 1966, Munich, West Germany) was a German actress.

She died reportedly from suicide, aged 33.

== Filmography ==
Year	Title	Role	Notes
1955	08/15 at Home	Barbara Brucks	
1956	IA in Oberbayern	Greta Bullerjahn	
1956	Lumpaci the Vagabond	Traudl, Kellnerin	
1957	Der Adler vom Velsatal	Gina Nicolini	
1957	Die verpfuschte Hochzeitsnacht	Ida Schulze	
1957	Tired Theodore	Lilo Haase	
1957	Junger Mann, der alles kann	Corinna	
1957	Von allen geliebt	Blumenverkäuferin	Uncredited
1957	At the Green Cockatoo by Night	Hilde Wagner, Irenes Schwester	
1958	Mikosch, the Pride of the Company	Susi Lindinger	
1958	Liebe kann wie Gift sein	Susanne	
1958	The Man Who Couldn't Say No	Marilzn	
1958	Gräfin Mariza	Lisa	
1959	Mikosch of the Secret Service	Susi Lindinger	
1959	I Spit on Your Grave	Sylvia Shannon	
1959	Immer die Mädchen	Lu	
1959	The Blue Sea and You	Suzy	
1959	Mein Schatz, komm mit ans blaue Meer	Lilo Fischer	
1960	The Crimson Circle	Thalia Drummond	
1960	Hit Parade 1960	Susanne	
1960	The True Jacob	Yvette	
1960	The Mystery of the Green Spider	Yvonne Krüger	
1961	Schlagerparade 1961	Susanne Grosser	
1961	Always Trouble with the Bed	Zsa Zsa	
1962	So toll wie anno dazumal	Evelyne Wilden	
1962	Axel Munthe, The Doctor of San Michele	Patientin	
1963	Girl's Apartment	Lolotte	
1964	Backfire	The Countess with Mario	
1964	Angélique, Marquise des Anges	Margot	
1965	Hotel of Dead Guests	Lucy Balmore	
1965	Marvelous Angelique	Margot	
1966	Agent 505: Death Trap in Beirut	Room Maid	
