= Franz Muxeneder =

Austrian actor

- Born: 19 October 1920; Salzburg, Austria
- Died: 3 January 1988 (aged 67); Munich, West Germany
- Occupation: Actor
- Years active: 1948–1987

Franz Muxeneder (19 October 1920 – 3 January 1988) was an Austrian actor. He appeared in more than one hundred films from 1948 to 1987.

Muxeneder is best known in Great Britain for his part in the Yugoslav-West German television series The White Horses (1966–1967).

== Selected filmography ==
Year	Title	Role	Notes
1980	Three Lederhosen in St. Tropez		
1976	Crime and Passion		
1976	Three Bavarians in Bangkok		
1974	Schwarzwaldfahrt aus Liebeskummer		
1971	Twenty Girls and the Teachers		
1971	Morgen fällt die Schule aus		
1971	Einer spinnt immer		
1969	House of Pleasure		
1968	Sexy Susan Sins Again		
1967	The Sweet Sins of Sexy Susan		
1966	The Sinful Village		
1966	Congress of Love		
1965	Tante Frieda – Neue Lausbubengeschichten		
1964	Schweik's Awkward Years		
1963	...denn die Musik und die Liebe in Tirol		
1963	Tomfoolery in Zell am See		
1962	His Best Friend		
1960	The Good Soldier Schweik		
1959	The Cow and I		
1959	Kein Mann zum Heiraten		
1959	Mikosch of the Secret Service		
1958	Mikosch, the Pride of the Company		
1958	Munchhausen in Africa		
1956	The Trapp Family		
1955	Hanussen		
1955	Operation Sleeping Bag		
1955	Three Men in the Snow		
1954	Love and Trumpets		
1954	Operation Edelweiss		
1953	Jonny Saves Nebrador		
1951	A Devil of a Woman		
