= Peter Kraus =

German singer and actor

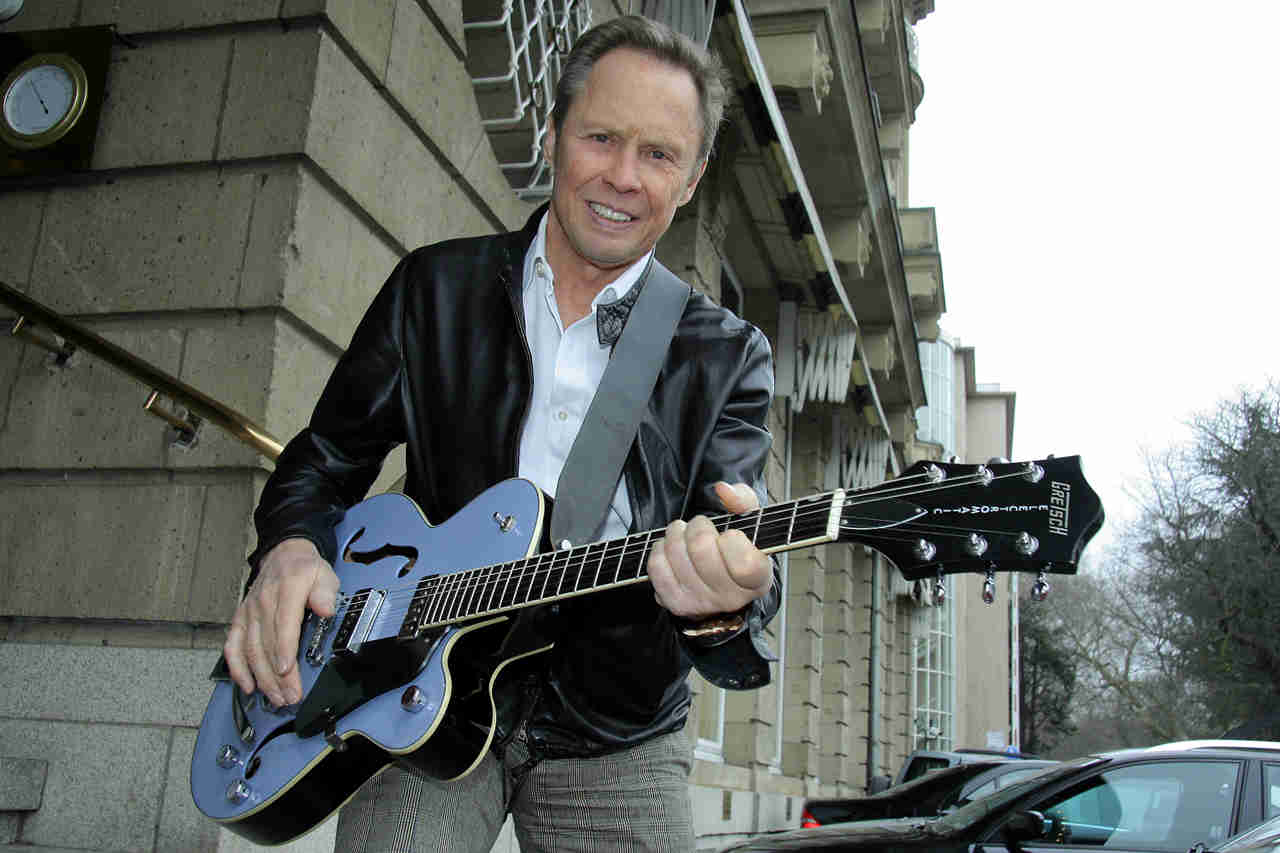
Peter Kraus in 2006

Peter Kraus (born 18 March 1939) is an Austrian singer, actor and television presenter. Born Peter Siegfried Krausenecker in Munich, Germany, Kraus became popular in the 1950s as one the first teen idols in the German-language area.

Kraus was one of the first singers to introduce German-language Rock and roll music and was therefore sometimes marketed as "the German Elvis Presley". He also starred in a number of films, often opposite Cornelia Froboess. After 17 top ten hits in the West German charts until the mid-1960s, his chart success faded, but he was able to maintain popularity with concerts, albums and TV shows.

== Early life and family ==
Kraus is the son of Austrian-born director and comedian Fred Krausnecker, and spent his youth alternating in Munich, Vienna and Salzburg where his father owned a small theatre. During his school years he took singing and acting lessons as well as step dancing classes. His first acting role was the part of Johnny in The Flying Classroom (1954) after the novel by Erich Kästner.

In 1969 Kraus married the photo model Ingrid. Kraus adopted Ingrid's daughter Gaby. A few years later their son Mike was born. Gaby died in her late thirties from breast cancer.

== Rock'n'Roll-Star ==
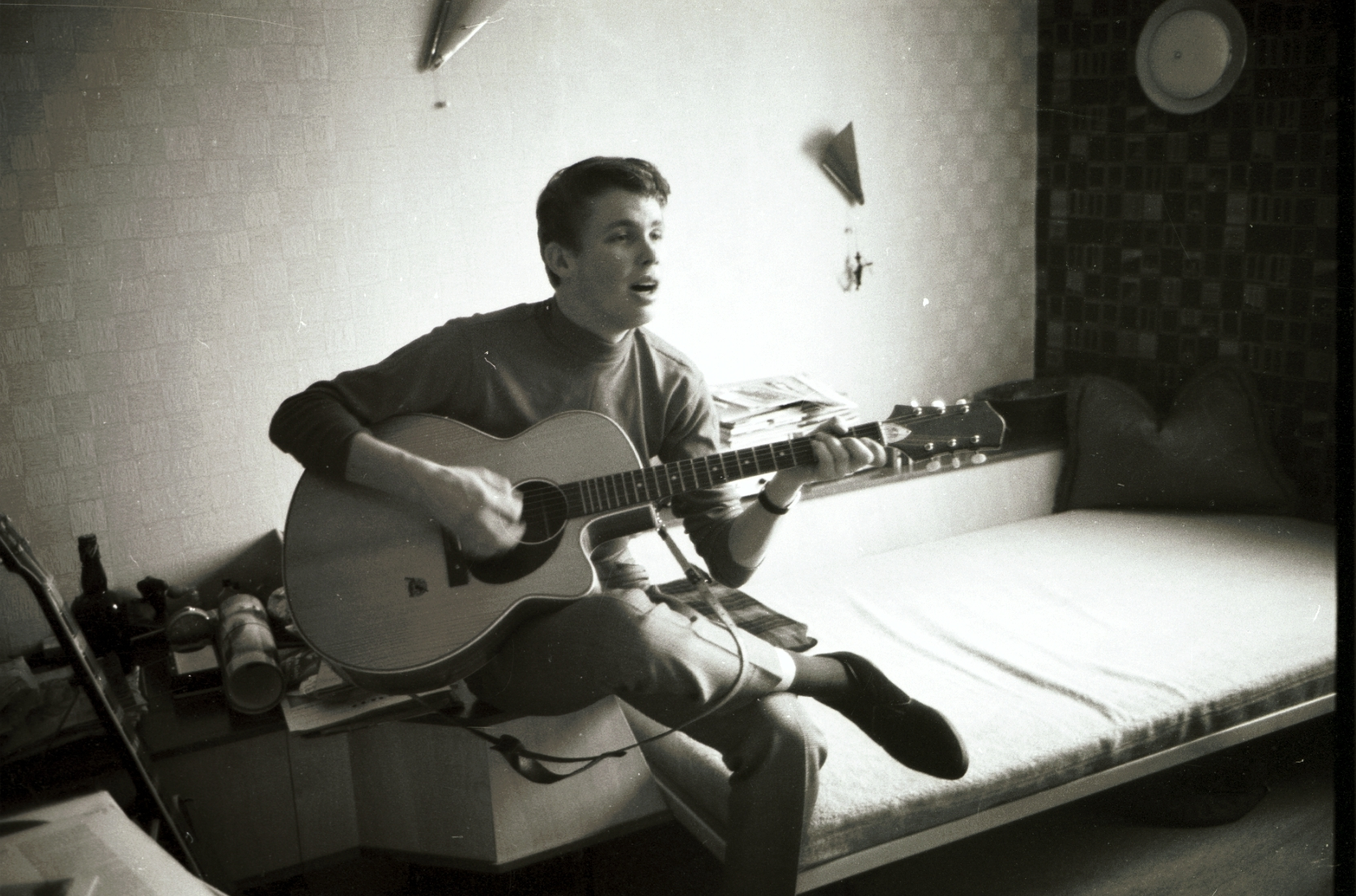
Kraus in 1960, photo by Jack Metzger

When the West German music industry discovered that rock 'n' roll was a big seller even with German lyrics, they marketed Kraus as an Elvis Presley copy. He soon became, like his colleague Ted Herold, one of West Germany's most popular singers and teen idols, the lanky figure and nonchalant attitude of the young man was a big hit with teens. In the first four years after his debut he recorded 36 hits and sold more than twelve million records.

Kraus's first disc in 1956 was a German version of Little Richard's "Tutti Frutti". In mid-1957 his first hit "Susi Rock“ followed and made it to number 8 in the charts. From then until 1964 Kraus was regularly in the West German charts. 1958 he recorded "Wenn Teenager träumen" (A Teenager's Romance), "Hula Baby" and "Sugar Baby", used in the 1985 Percy Adlon film Sugarbaby. This was followed in 1959 by his version of Fabian's "Tiger". At first Kraus was heavily influenced by Presley, but soon he managed to find his own style. As the "nice boy from next door" he sang with his female counterpart, teen idol Conny Froboess and appeared with her in the 1958 movie "Wenn die Conny mit dem Peter" and (1960) "Conny und Peter machen Musik". They became the most popular film stars of West German teenagers in the late fifties. In 1959 Kraus appeared with his father Fred Kraus, playing the role of his father, in "Melodie und Rhythmus".

Kraus also published some songs with Jörg Maria Berg; under the pseudonym The James Brothers; the two played German cover versions "Wenn" (When) in 1958, "Cowboy Billy" ("Don't Take Your Guns to Town") in 1959, "Rote Rosen" (Pretty Blue Eyes) in 1960, "Die jungen Jahre" (Endless Sleep) and "Hätt' ich einen Hammer" (If I Had a Hammer) in 1964, to name a few. He also sang duets with Connie Francis, Lill Babs, Danny Mann, Alice and Ellen Kessler, Gus Backus and Gina Dobra.

As of 2026, Kraus is still active in the German-language area, appearing on TV shows and giving concerts.

== Selected filmography ==
- The Flying Classroom (1954), as Johnny Trotz
- Precocious Youth (1957), as Günther
- Immer die Radfahrer (1958), as Robby Eilers
- The Crammer (1958), as Achim Bork
- Wenn die Conny mit dem Peter (1958), as Peter
- Everybody Loves Peter (1959), Peter Erdmann
- Conny and Peter Make Music (1960), as Peter
- What Is Father Doing in Italy? (1961), as Klaus Stumpf
- Im schwarzen Rößl (1961), as Gustl Zwanzger
- Walt Disney's Wonderful World of Color: The Waltz King (1963, TV), as Josef Strauss
- If You Go Swimming in Tenerife (1964), as Tom
- The Great Skate (1964), as Jonny King
- Lovemaker (1969), as Hans
- Paganini (1973, TV film), as Pimpinelli
- Thousand Eyes (1984), as Schirmer
- The Summer of the Samurai (1986), as Schirmer
- The Madonna Man (1987), as Schirmer
- Die fabelhaften Schwestern (2002, TV film), as Jonas King
- When Inge Is Dancing (2013), as Uncle Herb
