= Bezdružice =

- Town
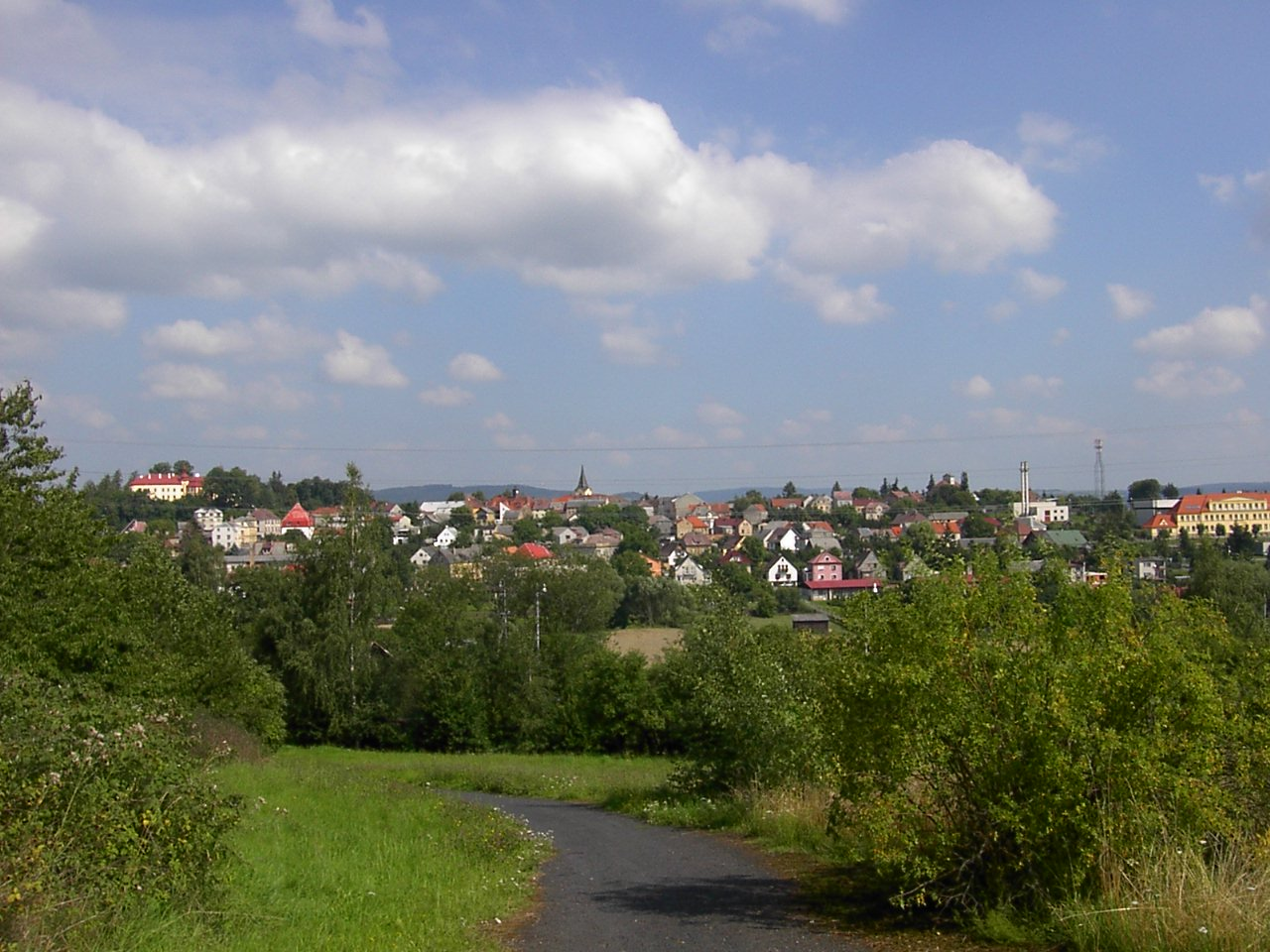
- Bezdružice seen from the south

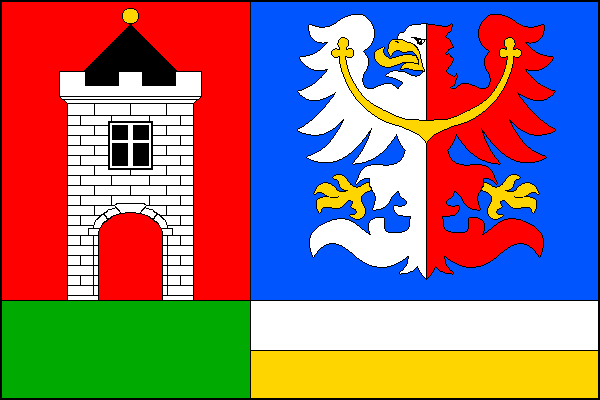
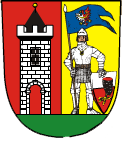
- Flag Coat of arms

- Location in the Czech Republic
- Coordinates: 49°54′26″N 12°58′21″E
- Country: Czech Republic
- Region: Plzeň
- District: Tachov
- First mentioned: 1227

Government
  - Mayor: Lumír Kadlec

Area
  - Total: 32.00 km^{2} (12.36 sq mi)
- Elevation: 576 m (1,890 ft)

Population (2026-01-01)
  - Total: 924
  - Density: 28.9/km^{2} (74.8/sq mi)
- Time zone: UTC+1 (CET)
  - Summer (DST): UTC+2 (CEST)
- Postal code: 349 53
- Website: www.bezdruzice.cz

Bezdružice (Czech pronunciation: [ˈbɛzdruʒɪtsɛ]; German: Weseritz) is a town in Tachov District in the Plzeň Region of the Czech Republic. It has about 900 inhabitants.

== Administrative division ==
Bezdružice consists of nine municipal parts (in brackets population according to the 2021 census):

- Bezdružice (770)
- Dolní Polžice (5)
- Horní Polžice (28)
- Kamýk (4)
- Kohoutov (0)
- Křivce (12)
- Pačín (6)
- Řešín (33)
- Zhořec (12)

== Etymology ==
The name is derived from the personal name Bezdruh, meaning "the village of Bezdruh's people".

== Geography ==
Bezdružice is located about 26 kilometres (16 mi) northeast of Tachov and 33 km (21 mi) northwest of Plzeň. It lies in the Teplá Highlands. The highest point is at 688 m (2,257 ft) above sea level. The municipal territory is rich in small streams.

== History ==
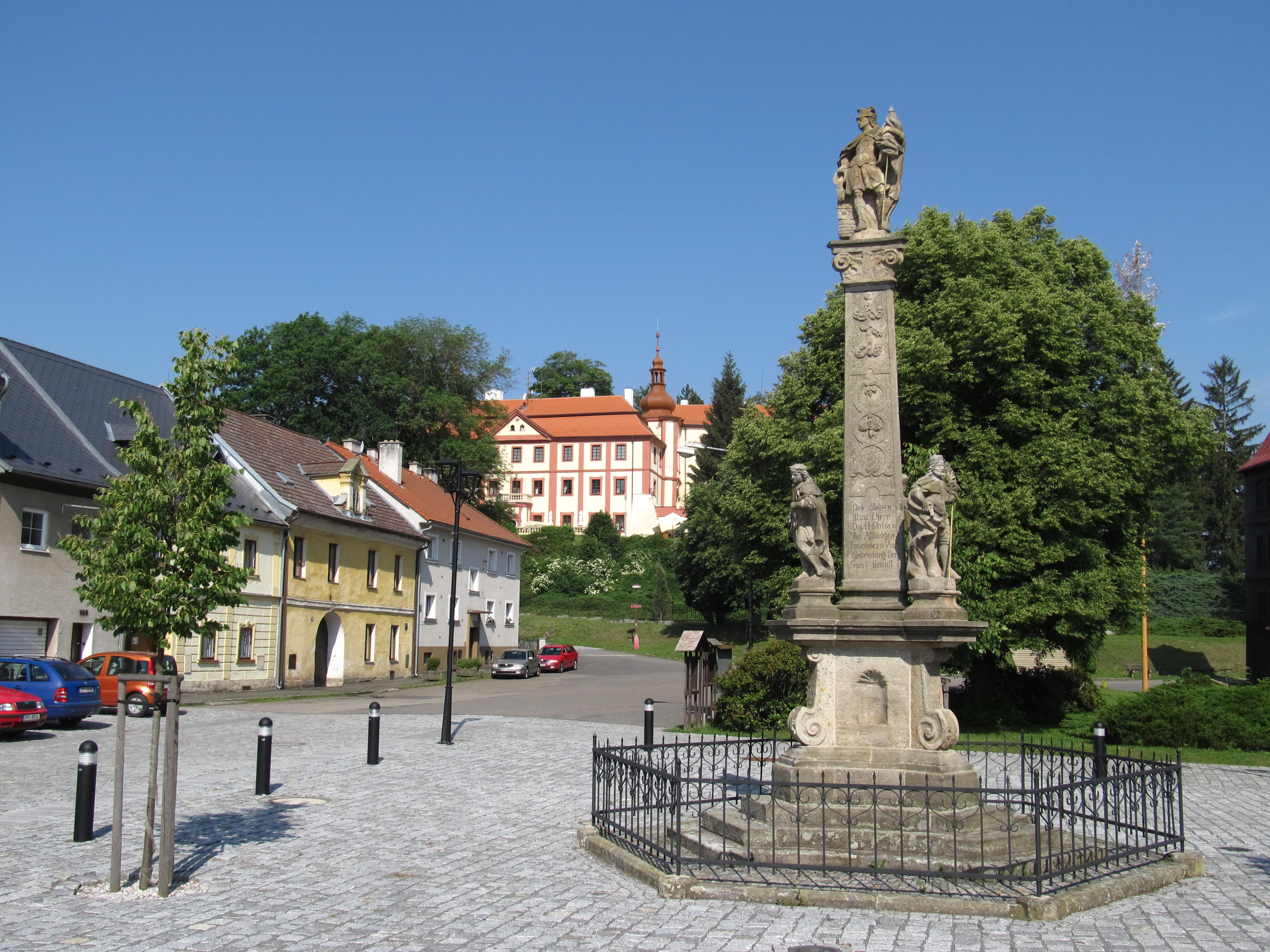
The square Náměstí Kryštofa Haranta with the Statue of Saint Florian

The first written mention of Bezdružice is from 1227. In 1360–1379, Bezdružice was owned by Knight Bušek and it was in these times, when a small stone castle was built. In 1459, the village became a market town.

From 1520 to 1614, a deadly plague infected the town. During the Thirty Years' War, around 1646, the town and the castle were burnt down by the invading Swedish army. In 1712, Bezdružice was acquired by the Löwenstein princely family. At that time, the old and new castles were already standing on the site of the original castle.

In 1808, another plague hit the town. In 1809, a fire destroyed a significant part of the town. Another disaster struck in 1815, when a windstorm ravaged Bezdružice.

The town became more popular when a railway was introduced to the town. The railway quickly gentrified the town. However, the population declined during and after World War II, mainly following the expulsion of local German inhabitants.

In 1949, Bezdružice lost the town status and was incorporated into the Tachov District. In 2006, the municipality regained the town status.

== Demographics ==
Historical population

| Year | Pop. | ±% |
|---|---|---|
| 1869 | 2,168 | — |
| 1880 | 2,158 | −0.5% |
| 1890 | 2,111 | −2.2% |
| 1900 | 2,010 | −4.8% |
| 1910 | 1,962 | −2.4% |

| Year | Pop. | ±% |
|---|---|---|
| 1921 | 1,977 | +0.8% |
| 1930 | 2,013 | +1.8% |
| 1950 | 983 | −51.2% |
| 1961 | 1,055 | +7.3% |
| 1970 | 1,034 | −2.0% |

| Year | Pop. | ±% |
|---|---|---|
| 1980 | 1,007 | −2.6% |
| 1991 | 981 | −2.6% |
| 2001 | 990 | +0.9% |
| 2011 | 894 | −9.7% |
| 2021 | 870 | −2.7% |

Source: Censuses

== Transport ==
Bezdružice is the starting point and terminus of the railway line from/to Radnice via Plzeň.

== Sights ==
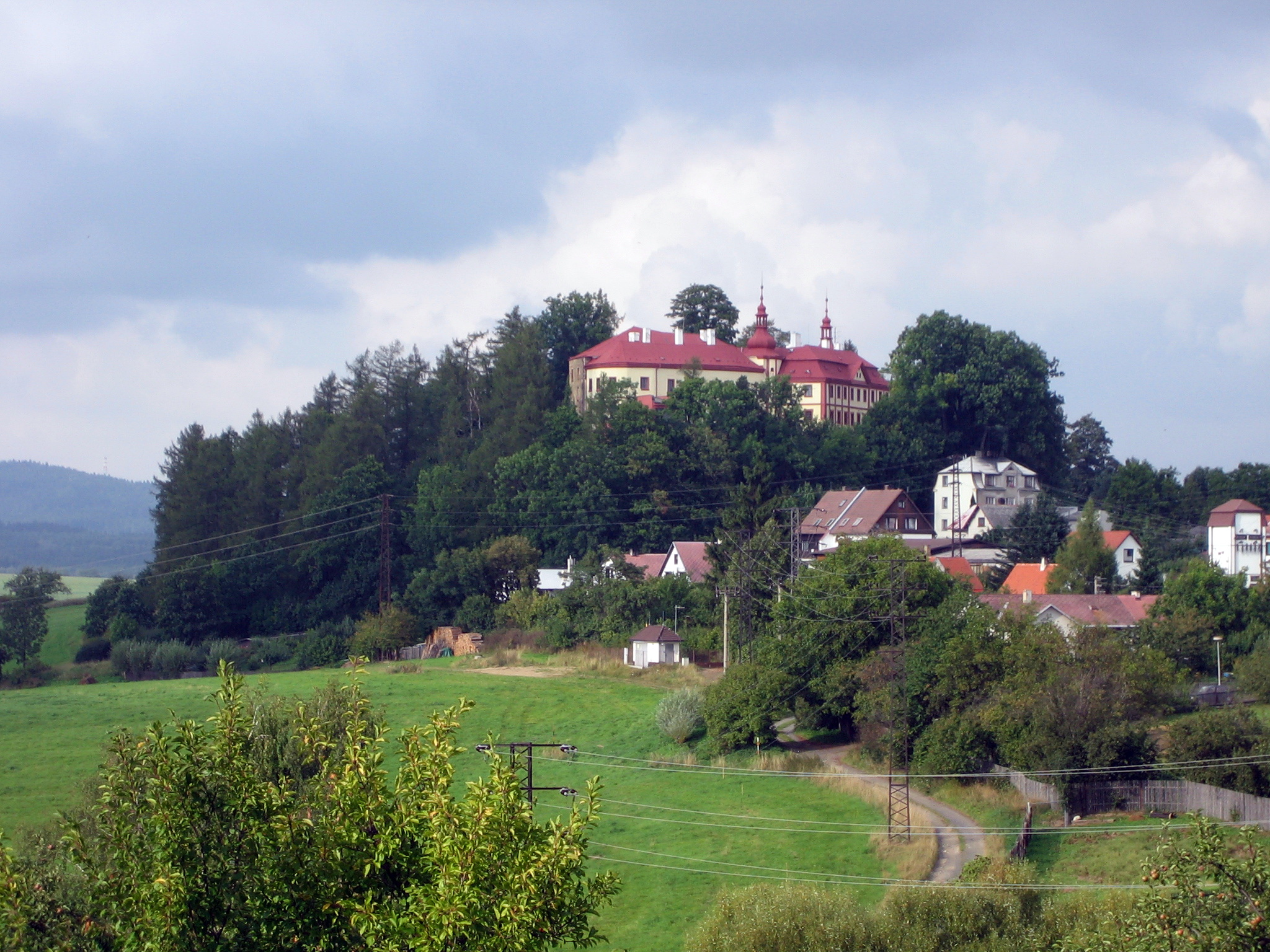
Bezdružice Castle above the town

Bezdružice Castle is a Gothic castle built by the Kolowrat family before 1330. The castle was partly demolished in the 18th century, but it was remodeled in the Baroque style.

The first mention of the Church of the Assumption of the Virgin Mary is from 1515, however the current church was built in 1710–1711, after the old one was demolished.

== Notable people ==
- Kryštof Harant (1564–1621), nobleman
- Louis Weinert-Wilton (1875–1945), German writer

== Gallery ==
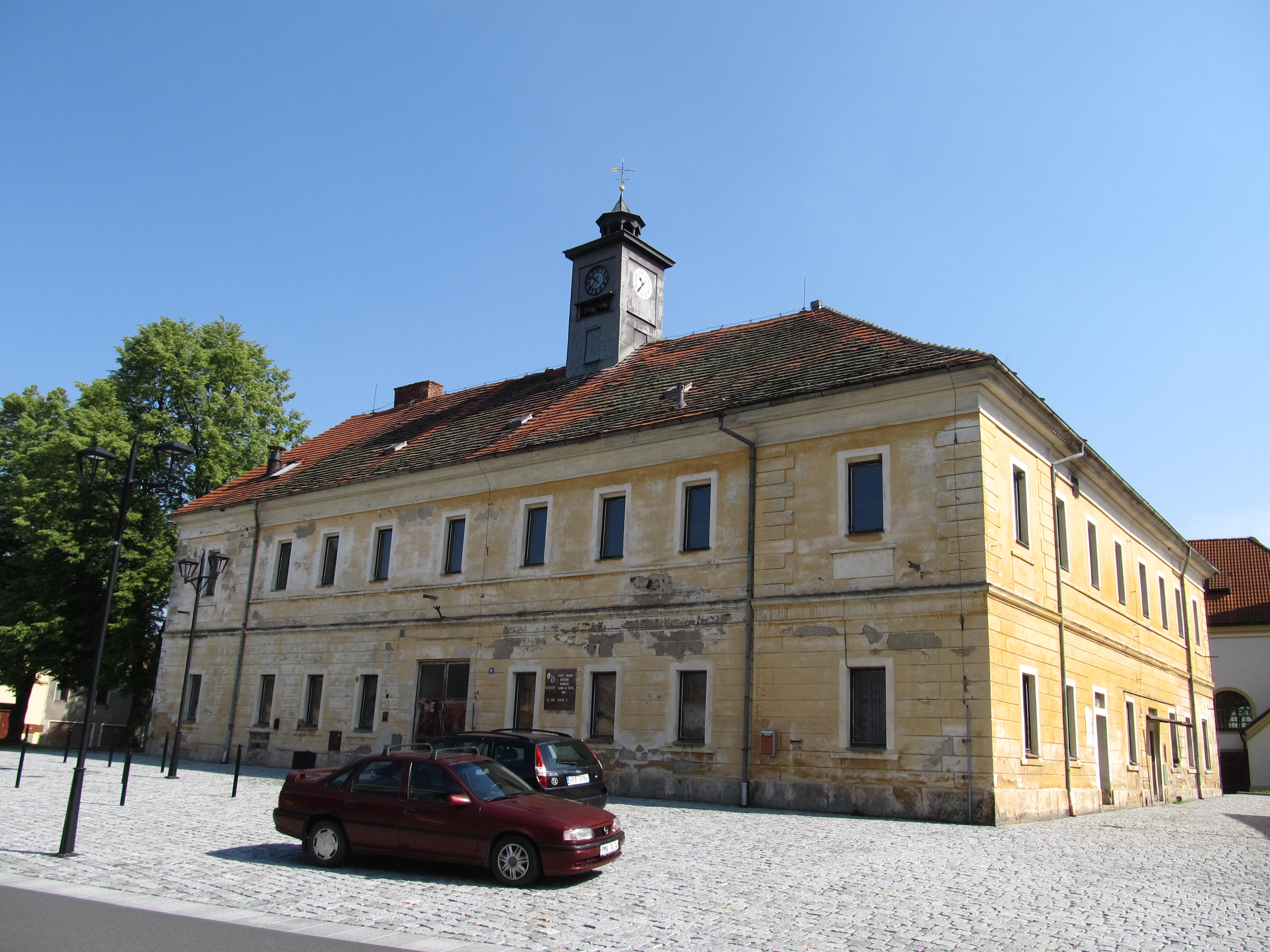
Former town hall

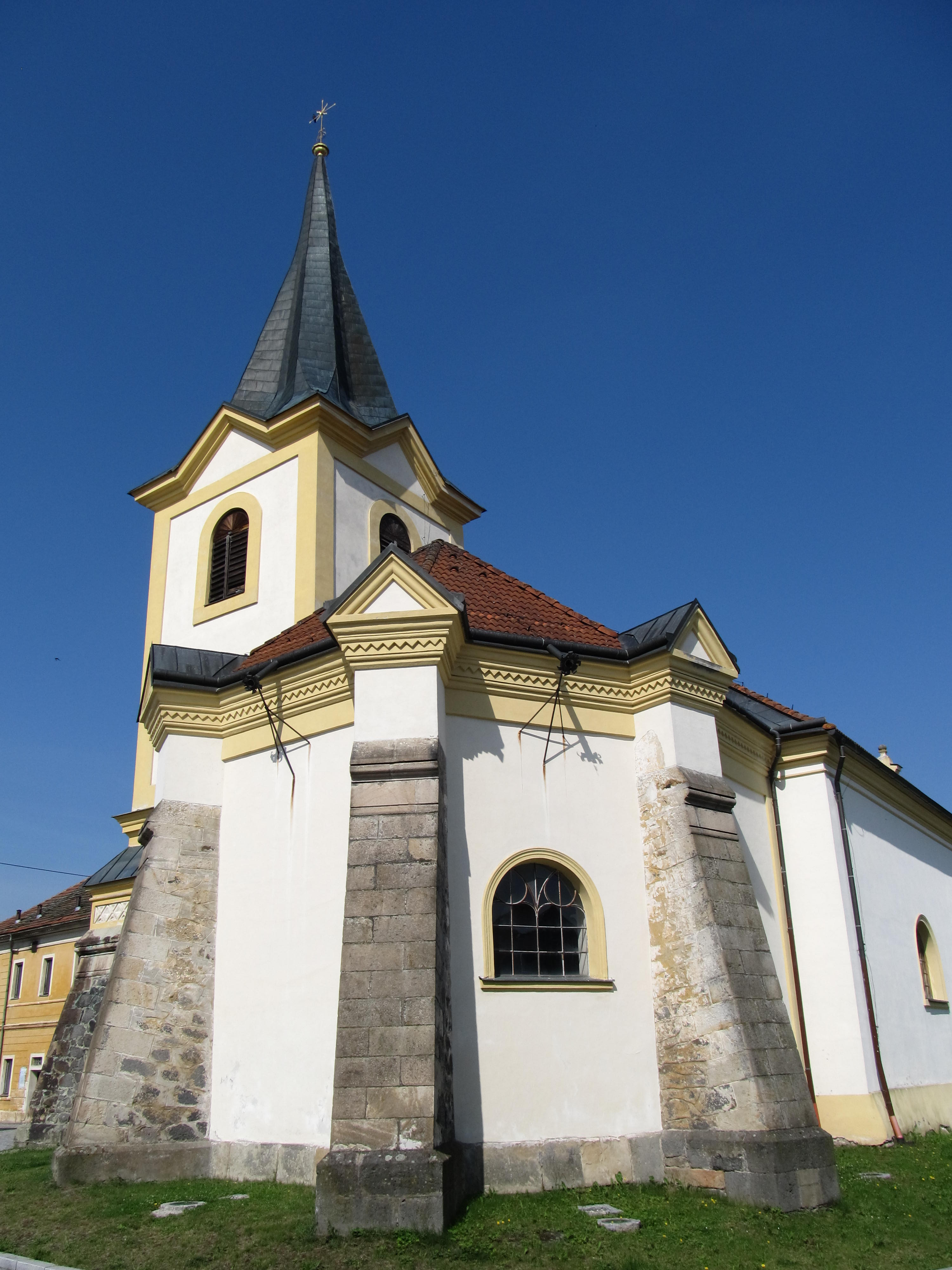
Church of the Assumption of the Virgin Mary

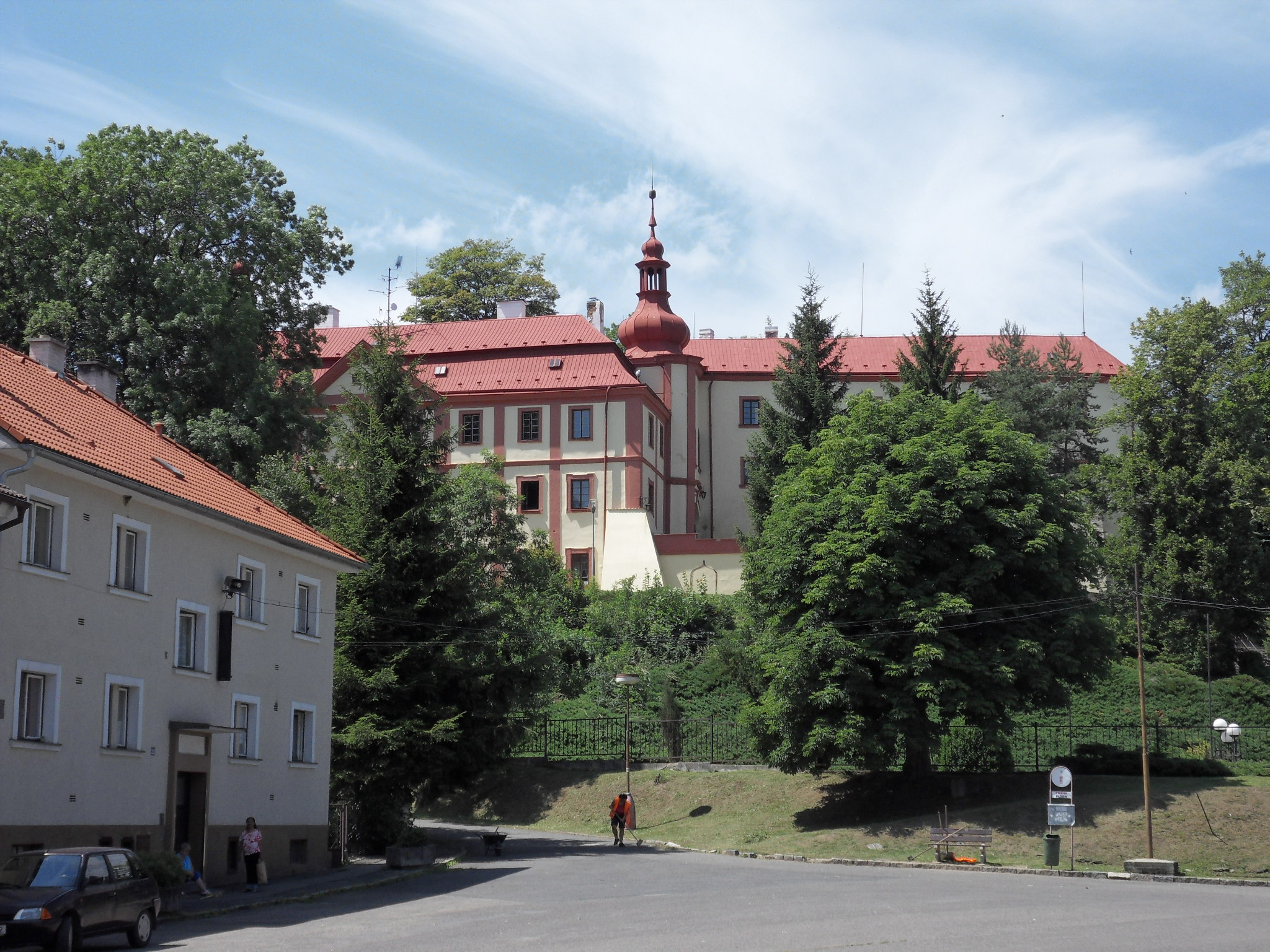
Bezdružice Castle
