= Conny and Peter Make Music =

1960 film

- German film poster
- German: Conny und Peter machen Musik
- Directed by: Werner Jacobs
- Written by: Karl Georg Külb; Werner Jacobs; Aldo von Pinelli
- Produced by: Luggi Waldleitner
- Starring: Cornelia Froboess; Peter Kraus; Gustav Knuth
- Cinematography: Erich Claunigk
- Edited by: Heinz Haber
- Music by: Gerhard Froboess; Charly Niessen; Werner Scharfenberger
- Production companies: Melodie Film; Roxy Film
- Distributed by: Constantin Film
- Release date: 12 August 1960
- Running time: 87 minutes
- Country: West Germany
- Language: German

Conny and Peter Make Music (German: Conny und Peter machen Musik) is a 1960 West German musical comedy film directed by Werner Jacobs and starring Cornelia Froboess, Peter Kraus and Gustav Knuth.

It is set in a hotel in Lake Lugano, which is a glacial lake situated on the border between southern Switzerland and Northern Italy. The lake, named after the city of Lugano, is situated between Lake Como and Lago Maggiore.

The film's sets were designed by the art directors Franz Bi and Bruno Monden.

== Cast ==
- Cornelia Froboess as Conny
- Peter Kraus as Peter
- Gustav Knuth as Trautmann
- Walter Gross as Maegerli
- Gudrun Schmidt as Ingrid Sandberg
- Kurt Großkurth as Sulzbach
- Karl Lieffen as Grossi
- Johanna König as Fräulein Hänchen, Sekretärin
- Ralf Wolter as Lehmann, Sulzbach's Assistant
- Anne-Marie Kolb as Miss Frankreich
- Ilse Corell as Miss Norwegen
- Hans Schwarz Jr. as Kriminalbeamter
- Trude Herr as Miss Nordsee
