= Kurt Großkurth =

German actor (1909–1975)

- Born: Kurt Großkurth; 11 May 1909; Langenselbold, Hanau, German Empire
- Died: 29 May 1975 (aged 66); Bad Aibling, West Germany
- Other name: Kurt Grosskurth
- Occupations: Actor, Singer
- Years active: 1930–73
- Spouse(s): Lisl Grosskurth, Martel Großkurth
- Children: Gloria Großkurth, Ute Großkurth, Kornelia Großkurth

Kurt Großkurth (or Grosskurth; 11 May 1909 – 29 May 1975) was a German actor and singer.

== Biography ==
Grosskurth was born in Langenselbold, Germany, in 1909.

He grew up in Rhineland-Palatinate. In the 1920s, he followed his father's wish and went on to study hotel management in Essen, London and Heidelberg. In the early 1930s, he discovered his passion for the stage and he picked up acting and singing in Bavaria. He quickly started performing as a singer, mostly around the Munich area, and guest starred as a tenor in Hamburg and Berlin. After the war, he got hired by several theaters and performed in operettas in Düsseldorf, Munich and Cologne, repeatedly directed by star conductor Franz Marszalek. As the 50s rolled along, he became a familiar movie figure throughout the country. He appeared as a supporting act in a considerable number of productions, which consisted mainly of lighthearted comedies and operettas. Although never seen in a lead role, he performed alongside virtually all of the major actors from post-war Germany. His entire film career spans over ninety movie and TV productions from 1949 to 1975. Several times within two decades, he appeared in the cast of five or six movies coming out the same year. He played the recurring character of a mayor in a popular TV series in the 60s, he could be heard on the radio, and with the 70s came burgeoning international recognition as he landed small roles in major productions. He plays parts in Luchino Visconti's Ludwig as well as in Edward Dymytryk's Bluebeard and in the French George Franju movie La ligne d'ombre. He's also part of the cast in Hollywood classic Willy Wonka and the Chocolate Factory, although his portrayal of character Harold Gloop, a stereotypical thick butcher, remains uncredited.

== Death ==
Großkurth died in Bad Aibling, Germany, shortly after his 66th birthday, on 29 May 1975, from a traffic accident.

His urn stands on the cemetery wall of Grünwald, near Munich.

== Filmography ==
- 1950: Wedding with Erika as Jakob
- 1952: The Smugglers' Banquet as Dikke Charles
- 1953: Arlette Conquers Paris as Kommissar
- 1953: The Divorcée (uncredited)
- 1953: The Night Without Morals
- 1953: The Little Town Will Go to Sleep
- 1954: Rose-Girl Resli
- 1954: Daybreak
- 1954: Hoheit lassen bitten as Ahlsen
- 1954: Sun Over the Adriatic as Ronic
- 1955: The Spanish Fly as Hartmann
- 1955: Love's Carnival as Nachtportier
- 1956: Magic Fire as Magdeburg Theatre Manager
- 1956: Weil du arm bist, mußt du früher sterben as Direktor Otto
- 1956: Holiday am Wörthersee as Mr. Groß, Hotelkönig aus Chicago
- 1956: Karussell der Liebe
- 1956: Hurra - die Firma hat ein Kind as Fabrikant Emil Winninger
- 1956: Manöverball as Ehemann
- 1956: The Old Forester House as Herr Engel
- 1956: The Hunter of Fall as Zollbeamter Niedergstötter
- 1957: Die verpfuschte Hochzeitsnacht as Raucher im Zug
- 1957: Tired Theodore as Walter Steinberg
- 1957: Two Bavarians in the Harem as Selam, Obereunuche (uncredited)
- 1957: Mit Rosen fängt die Liebe an as Zappke
- 1957: Greetings and Kisses from Tegernsee as Amandus
- 1958: Mikosch, the Pride of the Company as Otto Schummrich
- 1958: Bühne frei für Marika as Director Schuehlein
- 1958: Der Sündenbock von Spatzenhausen as Angerholzer
- 1958: Gräfin Mariza as Dragomir
- 1958: Kleine Leute mal ganz groß as Schorsch Glöckle
- 1959: La Paloma
- 1959: Hunting Party
- 1959: Mikosch of the Secret Service as Otto Schummrich
- 1959: Mandolins and Moonlight
- 1959: Der lustige Krieg des Hauptmann Pedro as Maximilian Moosbach, Bürgermeister
- 1959: Kein Mann zum Heiraten as Leo Hammerschmidt
- 1960: Hit Parade 1960 as Kaffehausbesitzer
- 1960: Conny and Peter Make Music as Sulzbach
- 1960: Willy the Private Detective as Ernst Abelmann
- 1960:We Will Never Part as Marcello Ponella
- 1961: Der fröhliche Weinberg (TV Movie)
- 1961: Am Sonntag will mein Süßer mit mir segeln gehn as Himberger, Evelyns Vater
- 1961: Our Crazy Aunts as Herrmann Schmatzer
- 1962: Drei Liebesbriefe aus Tirol as Direktor A.B. Cobold
- 1962: Verrückt und zugenäht as Otto Wehrkamp, Konservenfabrikant
- 1962: Dance with Me Into the Morning as Himself
- 1962: When the Music Plays at Wörthersee as Chauffeur Adalbert
- 1962: The Post Has Gone as Teutobald Stolze
- 1962: Die lustigen Vagabunden / Das haben die Mädchen gern as Tavernenwirt
- 1963: Our Crazy Nieces as Hyacinth Grad
- 1963: Übermut im Salzkammergut as Ruppich
- 1963: Hochzeit am Neusiedler See / Das Spukschloß im Salzkammergut as Rudi Lustig
- 1964: Our Crazy Aunts in the South Seas as Hyacinth
- 1964: Holiday in St. Tropez as Carlos Fonti
- 1964: Seven Hours of Gunfire as St. James
- 1965: The Last Tomahawk as Koch
- 1966: Spukschloß im Salzkammergut
- 1966: Ski Fever as Max
- 1967: Heubodengeflüster as Pischke
- 1970: Die Jungfrauen von Bumshausen as Bürgermeister Ehrentraut
- 1971: Olympia - Olympia (TV Movie)
- 1971: Willy Wonka & the Chocolate Factory as Mr. Gloop (uncredited)
- 1971: Obszönitäten / Mädchen, die sich lieben lassen as Der reiche Alte
- 1972: Bluebeard as Von Sepper's Friend
- 1972: Ludwig II as Minister of Finance
- 1973: The Countess Died of Laughter as Monk
- 1973: La ligne d'ombre as Alfred and Ernest Jacobus
