= Sin Began with Eve =

1958 film directed by Fritz Umgelter

- Directed by: Fritz Umgelter
- Written by: Dieter Hildebrandt; Margh Malina
- Produced by: Wolf C. Hartwig
- Starring: Willy Fritsch; Mady Rahl; Karin Dor
- Cinematography: Paul Grupp
- Edited by: Friedel Buckow
- Music by: Klaus Ogermann
- Production company: Rapid Film
- Distributed by: Defir Filmverleih
- Release date: 15 August 1958
- Running time: 85 minutes
- Country: West Germany
- Language: German

Sin Began with Eve (German: Mit Eva fing die Sünde an) is a 1958 West German comedy film directed by Fritz Umgelter and starring Willy Fritsch, Mady Rahl and Karin Dor. In 1962, Francis Ford Coppola used footage from this production for his film The Bellboy and the Playgirls.

== Cast ==
- Willy Fritsch as Gregor
- Mady Rahl as Barbara
- Michael Cramer as Jürgen
- Karin Dor as Dinah
- Hanne Wieder as Carla
- Otto Storr as Schnock
- Thomas Fabian as Doktor
- Fritz Havenstein as Herr Weber
- Hans Jürgen Diedrich as Inspizient
- Angèle Durand as Sängerin
