= The Secret of the Black Widow =

1963 film

- Film poster
- Directed by: Franz Josef Gottlieb
- Written by: Alexandra Becker; Rolf Becker; José Luis Guarner
- Based on: The Queen of the Night by Louis Weinert-Wilton
- Produced by: Alfons Carcasona
- Starring: O. W. Fischer; Karin Dor; Klaus Kinski
- Cinematography: Godofredo Pacheco
- Edited by: Anni Lautenbacher
- Music by: Martin Böttcher; Antonio Pérez Olea
- Production companies: International Germania Film; Procusa
- Distributed by: International Germania Film
- Release date: 28 November 1963
- Running time: 110 minutes
- Countries: Spain; West Germany
- Language: German

The Secret of the Black Widow (German: Das Geheimnis der schwarzen Witwe) is a 1963 West German crime film directed by Franz Josef Gottlieb and starring O. W. Fischer, Karin Dor and Klaus Kinski. It is part of a boom of Krimi films produced during the decade, the third of four films based on the work of Louis Weinert-Wilton that came in the wake of Rialto Film's successful Edgar Wallace adaptations. It was shot in Spain. The film's sets were designed by the art director Ramiro Gómez.

== Cast ==
- O. W. Fischer as Wellby
- Karin Dor as Clarisse
- Klaus Kinski as Boyd
- Werner Peters as Mr. Shor
- Doris Kirchner as Mrs. Shor
- Eddi Arent as Fish
- Claude Farell as Mrs. Ayke
- Gabriel Llopart as Selwood
- José María Caffarel as Cartwright
- Antonio Casas as Bronsfield
- Félix Dafauce as Inspector Terry
- Cris Huerta as Slim
- Tomás Blanco
- Ángel Menéndez
- George Rigaud

== Bibliography ==
- Goble, Alan. The Complete Index to Literary Sources in Film. Walter de Gruyter, 1999.
