= Munchhausen in Africa =

1958 film

- German film poster
- German: Münchhausen in Afrika
- Directed by: Werner Jacobs
- Written by: Johannes Hendrich; Max Nosseck; Hans Rameau
- Produced by: Artur Brauner
- Starring: Peter Alexander; Gunther Philipp; Anita Gutwell
- Cinematography: Tony Braun; Karl Löb
- Edited by: Jutta Hering; Walter Wischniewsky
- Music by: Heinz Gietz
- Production company: CCC Film
- Distributed by: Prisma Filmverleih
- Release date: 17 July 1958
- Running time: 88 minutes
- Country: West Germany
- Language: German

Munchhausen in Africa (German: Münchhausen in Afrika) is a 1958 West German musical comedy film directed by Werner Jacobs and starring Peter Alexander, Gunther Philipp and Anita Gutwell. A modern descendant of Baron Munchausen goes to Africa where he has numerous adventures.

The film's sets were designed by the art directors Emil Hasler, Paul Markwitz, and Helmut Nentwig. It was shot at the Spandau Studios in Berlin and on location in Kenya.

== Cast ==
- Peter Alexander as Peter von Münchhausen
- Gunther Philipp as Bill
- Anita Gutwell as Josefine
- Johanna König as Karla Mai
- Roland Kaiser as Karlchen Mai
- Ursula Herking as School director
- Erich Fiedler as TV presenter
- Hugo Lindinger as Herr Leiser
- Franz Muxeneder as Jan
- Benno Hoffmann as Wildhüter
- Brigitte Mira as Karla Mai (voice)
- Bruno W. Pantel as Publisher representative
- Arno Paulsen as Tropical doctor
- Erna Sellmer as Emilie
