= The Blue Sea and You =

1959 film

- Directed by: Thomas Engel
- Written by: Fritz Böttger; Per Schwenzen; Fred Ignor
- Produced by: Artur Brauner; Willy Zeyn
- Starring: Fred Bertelmann; Karin Dor; Renate Ewert
- Cinematography: Heinz Hölscher
- Edited by: Elisabeth Kleinert-Neumann; Alice Seedorf
- Music by: Charly Niessen; Nils Nobach
- Production company: Willy Zeyn-Film
- Distributed by: Union-Film
- Release date: 15 October 1959
- Running time: 93 minutes
- Country: West Germany
- Language: German

The Blue Sea and You (German: Das blaue Meer und Du) is a 1959 West German romantic comedy film directed by Thomas Engel and starring Fred Bertelmann, Karin Dor and Renate Ewert.

The film's art direction was by Wolf Englert and Ernst Richter. It was shot at Berlin's Spandau Studios with location shooting taking place in Montenegro and Mostar.

== Cast ==
- Karin Dor as Helga Heidebrink
- Renate Ewert as Suzy
- Chris Howland as Christopher Greenwood
- Ursula Herking as Fräulein Spätlieb
- Hans Nielsen as Direktor Heidebrink
- Stanislav Ledinek as Der Bärtige
- Eduard Wandrey
- Kurt Weitkamp
- Petar Spajic-Suljo
- Käte Jaenicke
- Ada Witzke
- Kurt Pratsch-Kaufmann
- Klaus Becker

== Bibliography ==
- Bock, Hans-Michael & Bergfelder, Tim. The Concise CineGraph. Encyclopedia of German Cinema. Berghahn Books, 2009.
