= If You Go Swimming in Tenerife =

1964 film

- Directed by: Helmuth M. Backhaus
- Written by: Helmuth M. Backhaus
- Produced by: Eva Rosskopf
- Starring: Geneviève Cluny; Peter Kraus; Gunnar Möller
- Cinematography: Gerhard Krüger
- Edited by: Anneliese Artelt
- Music by: Christian Bruhn
- Production company: Piran-Film
- Distributed by: Piran-Film
- Release date: 11 September 1964
- Running time: 94 minutes
- Country: West Germany
- Language: German

If You Go Swimming in Tenerife (German: Wenn man baden geht auf Teneriffa) is a 1964 West German comedy film directed by Helmuth M. Backhaus and starring Geneviève Cluny, Peter Kraus and Gunnar Möller.

The film's sets were designed by the art director Johannes Ott. It was shot on location in Munich and on Gran Canaria in the Canary Islands.

== Synopsis ==
After travelling to Spain for a holiday, six young Germans discover that their travel agency has gone bust and therefore they have nowhere to stay. Instead they find employment at a local hotel, which they soon have to try and save from ruin.

== Soundtrack ==
The production features a number of songs including:

- Peter Kraus - "Wer Dich Sieht, Evelyn"

== Cast ==
- Geneviève Cluny as Jutta
- Peter Kraus as Tom
- Gunnar Möller as Jens
- Corny Collins as Christa
- Richard Häussler as Erik Varnhagen
- Ursula Oberst as Bessy
- Helga Lehner as Bruni
- Heinz Erhardt as Tristan Wentzel
- Loni Heuser as Christa's Mother
- Karin Heske
- Hannes Stütz
- Ralph Persson
- Hans Elwenspoek
- Rolf Castell
- Horst Pasderski
- Katrin Teleky

== Bibliography ==
- Robert C. Reimer & Reinhard Zachau. German Culture through Film: An Introduction to German Cinema. Hackett Publishing, 2017.
