= The Secret of the Chinese Carnation =

1964 film

- Film poster
- Directed by: Rudolf Zehetgruber
- Written by: Rudolf Zehetgruber
- Based on: The Chinese Carnation by Louis Weinert-Wilton
- Produced by: Wolf C. Hartwig
- Starring: Paul Dahlke; Olga Schoberová; Dietmar Schönherr
- Cinematography: Jan Stallich
- Edited by: Herbert Taschner
- Music by: Milos Vacek
- Production companies: Rapid Film; Metheus Film; Les Films Jacques Leitienne
- Distributed by: Constantin Film
- Release date: 9 October 1964
- Running time: 95 minutes
- Countries: France; Italy; West Germany
- Language: German

The Secret of the Chinese Carnation (German: Das Geheimnis der chinesischen Nelke, Italian: Il segreto del garofano cinese) is a 1964 German-Italian krimi eurospy film directed by Rudolf Zehetgruber and starring Paul Dahlke, Olga Schoberová, Klaus Kinski and Dietmar Schönherr. It is based on a novel by Louis Weinert-Wilton, one of four film adaptations of his work released in the wake of the commercial success of Rialto Film's Edgar Wallace series.

It was shot at the Barrandov Studios in Prague and on location in the city. The film's sets were designed by the art director Otto Renelt.

== Cast ==
- Paul Dahlke as Reginald Sheridan
- Olga Schoberová as Susan Bexter
- Dietmar Schönherr as Dr. Cecil Wilkens
- Horst Frank as Leutnant Legget
- Klaus Kinski as Speranzo
- Brad Harris as Donald Ramsey
- Dominique Boschero as Mary Lou
- Corrado Annicelli as Professor Bexter
- Maria Vincent as Kitty
- Pierre Richard as Inspektor Travers
- Jacques Bézard
- Siegfried Grönig as Gillespie

== Bibliography ==
- Goble, Alan (1999). The Complete Index to Literary Sources in Film. Berlin: Walter de Gruyter. ISBN 978-3-11-095194-3.
