= Three Lederhosen in St. Tropez =

1980 film by Franz Marischka

- Directed by: Franz Marischka
- Written by: Kurt Eiser; Franz Marischka
- Produced by: Leon Pulver
- Starring: Peter Steiner; Fred Stillkrauth; Mario Pollak
- Cinematography: Ernst W. Kalinke
- Edited by: Gerd Berner
- Production company: Colena Film
- Distributed by: Alemannia/Arabella Filmverleih
- Release date: 19 December 1980
- Running time: 91 minutes
- Country: West Germany
- Language: German

Three Lederhosen in St. Tropez (German: Drei Lederhosen in St. Tropez) is a 1980 West German sex comedy film directed by Franz Marischka and starring Peter Steiner, Fred Stillkrauth and Mario Pollak.

== Cast ==
- Peter Steiner as Peter Eichel
- Fred Stillkrauth as Korbinian Zangerl
- Mario Pollak as Paloma
- Eleonore Melzer as Marta Eichel
- Franz Muxeneder as Huber-Bauer
- Alexandra Beau as Evi
- Hermann Giefer as Vitus
- Ursula Buchfellner as Carla
- Sibylle Rauch as Blondine
- Rolf Eden as Papilein
- Peter Steiner Jr. as Briefträger
- Jacques Herlin as Französischer Polizeichef
- Rosl Mayr as Alte Millionärin
- Bob Lockwood as Transvestit Karlchen
- Toni Netzle as Frau Klein
- Christiane Blumhoff as Journalistin
- Loisl Wille as Französischer Polizist
- Felix Paul as Musikant
- Marshall Reynor as Musikant
- Egon Keresztes as Französischer Polizist
- Fritz Wallenwein as Französischer Polizist
- Sascha Atzenbeck as Liebespaar am Strand
- Alon D'Armand as Hotelmanager
- Franz Marischka as Chef des Autohauses
- Margit Ojetz as Liebespaar am Strand
- Claus Sasse as Autoverkäufer

== Bibliography ==
- Herminghouse, Patricia; Mueller, Magda, eds. (1997). Gender and Germanness: Cultural Productions of Nation. Berghahn Books. ISBN 978-1-57181-112-7.
