= Franziska Liebing =

German actress (1899–1993)

- Born: 6 February 1899; Munich, Kingdom of Bavaria, Germany
- Died: 3 January 1993 (aged 93); Munich, Bavaria, Germany
- Occupation: Actress
- Years active: 1921–1979

Franziska Liebing (6 February 1899 – 3 January 1993) was a German actress, who worked in theatre, film and television.

== Biography ==
Franziska Liebing was born in Munich, Kingdom of Bavaria in South East Germany. where got her training from Austrian silent film actress Emma Berndl (1877 - 1934).

Liebing started her theatrical career in Wurzberg in 1921, then worked in Nuremberg, at the "Münchener Schauspielhaus" and at Konrad Dreher's touring theater.

Between 1928 and 1932 she had an engagement at the "Landestheater Meiningen", after that she worked at the "Reichssender" in Munich; later she was a freelancer at various theaters and Berlin guest performance companies. Liebing belonged to the ensemble of the "Schauspielhaus" in Munich from 1925 to 1930 and appeared on stage at the "Meiningen Theater" in 1931/32. After a few years without an engagement, she was under contract in Berlin with Gustav Bartelmus, Richard Handwerk and Bernd Königsfeld.

Since the 1950s, she devoted herself extensively to German film and television, where she often played smart, hands-on, but also curious neighbors and landladies, for example in the series "Funkstreife Isar 12", in "Die seltsamen Methoden des Franz Josef Wanninger" and in 1979, directed by Kurt Wilhelm, in the film version of Ludwig Thomas' peasant novel "Der Ruepp".

Franziska Liebing died on 3 January 1993, from natural causes, at the age of 93, at a nursing facility in Munich, Bavaria. Her grave is located in the old part of the "Westfriedhof" in Munich (grave 157-W-24).

== Filmography ==
Year	Title	Role	Notes
1954	Prisoners of Love		
1956	Ich suche Dich	Frau Forster	
1958	...und nichts als die Wahrheit		Uncredited
1959	Menschen im Netz	Frau Liebermann	
1961	Jack Mortimer	Frau Kramer	TV Movie
1961-1963	Funkstreife Isar 12	Frau Wert / Frau Kreitmayer / Frau Gillmoser	TV Series, 3 episodes
1962	Axel Munthe, The Doctor of San Michele		
1963-1966	Das Kriminalmuseum	Nachbarin / Kundin bei Struck	TV Series, 3 episodes
1965	Der Nachtkurier meldet		Episode: "Schwindel auf Raten"
1965	Die Reise nach Steiermark	Mayerhoferin	TV Movie
1965-1967	Die seltsamen Methoden des Franz Josef Wanninger	Frau Burgmüller	TV Series, 13 episodes
1967	The Blood Demon	Alte Frau die der Kutscher nach dem Weg fragt	Uncredited
1968	Madame Legros		TV Movie
1971	Augenzeugen müssen blind sein		TV Movie
1971	Willy Wonka & the Chocolate Factory	Grandma Josephine	Uncredited
1973	Hubertus Castle		
1973-1976	Tatort	Milchfrau / Rentnerin	TV Series, 2 episodes
1979	Der Ruepp	Die alte Loni, Apollonia Amesreiter	TV Movie, (final film role)
