= A Love Story (1954 film) =

1954 film directed by Rudolf Jugert

- Directed by: Rudolf Jugert
- Written by: Axel Eggebrecht; Carl Zuckmayer
- Based on: A Love Story by Carl Zuckmayer
- Produced by: Erich Pommer
- Starring: Hildegard Knef; O.W. Fischer; Viktor de Kowa
- Cinematography: Hans Schneeberger
- Edited by: Anneliese Artelt
- Music by: Werner Eisbrenner
- Production company: Intercontinental Film
- Distributed by: Deutsche Film Hansa
- Release date: 25 February 1954
- Running time: 97 minutes
- Country: West Germany
- Language: German

A Love Story (German: Eine Liebesgeschichte) is a 1954 West German historical romantic drama film directed by Rudolf Jugert and starring Hildegard Knef, O.W. Fischer and Viktor de Kowa. It was shot at the Wandsbek Studios in Hamburg and on location in Celle and Umgebung. The film's sets were designed by the art directors Erich Kettelhut and Johannes Ott. It was produced by Erich Pommer's independent company Intercontinental Film. It was part of the tradition of Prussian films, which had enjoyed great popularity in the Weimair and Nazi eras.

== Synopsis ==
In Prussia in 1764, a hero of the Seven Years' War falls in love with an actress who had previously been a mistress to another officer. He wants to marry her, but both his family and his superiors do everything they can to thwart the relationship, considering her low status as inappropriate for him.

== Cast ==
- Hildegard Knef as Lili Schallweiß, Schauspielerin
- O.W. Fischer as Jost v. Fredersdorff, Rittmeister
- Viktor de Kowa as Manfred v. Prittwitz, Major
- Karl Ludwig Diehl as Oberst Kessler, Regiments-Kommandeur
- Mathias Wieman as Fritz v. Fredersdorff, Gutsbesitzer
- Claus Biederstaedt as von Gagern, Regiments-Adjutant
- Maria Paudler as Henriette Kessler
- Helga Siemers as Marta Kessler, Tochter
- Alf Pankarter as Leutnant v. Mürwitz
- Reinhold Schünzel as Schlumberger, Schauspieldirektor

== Bibliography ==
- Broadbent, Philip & Hake, Sabine. Berlin Divided City, 1945-1989. Berghahn Books, 2010.
