= Everybody Loves Peter =

1959 film

- Directed by: Wolfgang Becker
- Written by: István Békeffy; Clement Ott; Per Schwenzen
- Produced by: Ilse Kubaschewski; Ernst Steinlechner
- Starring: Peter Kraus; Hannelore Schroth; Christine Kaufmann
- Cinematography: Oskar Schnirch
- Edited by: Wolfgang Flaum
- Music by: Erwin Halletz
- Production companies: Divina Film; Melodie Film
- Distributed by: Gloria Film
- Release date: 3 June 1959
- Running time: 95 minutes
- Country: West Germany
- Language: German

Everybody Loves Peter (German: Alle lieben Peter) is a 1959 West German musical comedy film directed by Wolfgang Becker and starring Peter Kraus, Hannelore Schroth and Christine Kaufmann. It was shot at the Bavaria Studios in Munich in Eastmancolor. The film's sets were designed by the art directors Werner Achmann and Willy Schatz.

== Cast ==
- Peter Kraus as Peter Erdmann
- Hannelore Schroth as Sylvia, Peters Mutter
- Christine Kaufmann as Kitty Steiner
- Helen Vita as Zita, Sylvias Schwester
- Boy Gobert as Bernd Werding
- Peter Vogel as Tommy
- Gustav Knuth as Generaldirektor Steiner
- Beppo Brem as Hubmeier, Autohändler
- Margrit Aust as Frau Steiner
- Petra Himboldt as Susi Steiner - 13 Jahre
- Monika Ettrich as Baby Steiner - 8 Jahre
- Max Kutta as Billy - Student
- Brigitte Wentzel as Sofie - Stubenmädchen
- Karl Tischlinger as Polizist Radfahrerszene

== Bibliography ==
- Bock, Hans-Michael & Bergfelder, Tim. The Concise CineGraph. Encyclopedia of German Cinema. Berghahn Books, 2009.
- Hobsch, Manfred. Liebe, Tanz und 1000 Schlagerfilme. Schwarzkopf & Schwarzkopf, 1998.
