= The Mystery of the Green Spider =

1960 film

- Directed by: Franz Marischka
- Written by: Franz Marischka
- Produced by: Wolfgang Birk; Carl Szokoll
- Starring: Adrian Hoven; Renate Ewert; Hans von Borsody
- Cinematography: Dieter Wedekind
- Edited by: Ilse Wilken
- Music by: Gert Wilden
- Production company: Tele-Film
- Distributed by: Union-Film
- Release date: 23 August 1960
- Running time: 88 minutes
- Country: West Germany
- Language: German

The Mystery of the Green Spider (German: Das Rätsel der grünen Spinne) is a 1960 West German musical crime thriller film directed by Franz Marischka and starring Adrian Hoven, Renate Ewert and Hans von Borsody. The film's sets were designed by the art director Otto Pischinger.

== Cast ==
- Adrian Hoven as Peter Thorsten
- Renate Ewert as Yvonne Krüger
- Hans von Borsody as Ted Wagner
- Jochen Brockmann as Kommissar Bock
- Bettina Schön as Elena
- Bill Ramsey as Bill Brown
- Gerti Gordon as Lilly
- Dany Mann as Penny
- Ditmar Christensen as Alex
- Gert Wiedenhofen as Bock's Assistant
- Jean Thomé as Charly
- Eva Iro as Anita
- Lilo Schick as Berta
- Jacqueline Boyer as Sängerin
- Angèle Durand as Maria Moulin
- Will Brandes
- Detlef Engel
- Billy Mo
- Tony Sandler
- Heinz Schachtner

== Bibliography ==
- Bock, Hans-Michael & Bergfelder, Tim. The Concise CineGraph. Encyclopedia of German Cinema. Berghahn Books, 2009.
- Hobsch, Manfred. Liebe, Tanz und 1000 Schlagerfilme. Schwarzkopf & Schwarzkopf, 1998.
- Kramp, Joachim· Hallo! Hier spricht Edgar Wallace: die Geschichte der deutschen Kriminalfilmserie 1959–1972. Schwarzkopf & Schwarzkopf, 2001.
