= Conrad von Molo =

Austrian film producer and editor

- Born: 21 December 1906; Vienna, Austro-Hungarian Empire
- Died: 12 August 1997 (aged 90); Munich, Bavaria, Germany
- Occupations: Editor; Producer
- Years active: 1931–1971

Conrad von Molo (21 December 1906 – 12 August 1997) was an Austrian film producer and editor. von Molo worked primarily in the Germany industry, except for a brief spell spent in Britain in the 1930s. von Molo later specialised in overseeing the dubbing of foreign productions for German-speaking markets.

He was the son of the writer Walter von Molo. His sister Trude von Molo became a leading film actress, before suddenly retiring.

== Filmography ==
Editor

- The Trunks of Mr. O.F. (1931)
- The Four from Bob 13 (1932)
- Cavaliers of the Kurfürstendamm (1932)
- The Testament of Dr. Mabuse (1933)
- The Amateur Gentleman (1936)
- Crime Over London (1936)
- Accused (1936)
- Jump for Glory (1937)
- Then We'll Get a Divorce (1940)
- Our Miss Doctor (1940)
- Stukas (1941)
- The Red Terror (1942)
- A Salzburg Comedy (1943)

=== Producer ===
- Ludwig II (1955)
- Ich suche dich (1956)
- The Man Who Couldn't Say No (1958)
- Mit Himbeergeist geht alles besser(1960)
- The Defector (1966)

== Bibliography ==
- Brook, Vincent. Driven to Darkness: Jewish Emigre Directors and the Rise of Film Noir. Rutgers University Press, 2009.
