= Franz Marischka =

Austrian actor (1918–2009)

- Born: 2 July 1918; Unterach am Attersee, Austro-Hungarian Empire
- Died: 18 February 2009 (aged 90); Munich, Germany
- Other name: Franz Otto Felix Marischka
- Occupations: Director, screenwriter, actor
- Years active: 1951–1987 (film)

Franz Marischka (1918–2009) was an Austrian actor, screenwriter and film director. He was the son of the director Hubert Marischka.

== Selected filmography ==
=== Screenwriter ===
- The Daughter of the Regiment (1953)
- Victoria and Her Hussar (1954)
- Die Christel von der Post (1956)
- Love, Summer and Music (1956)
- Almenrausch and Edelweiss (1957)
- Mikosch, the Pride of the Company (1958)
- A Summer You Will Never Forget (1959)
- Mandolins and Moonlight (1959)
- Agatha, Stop That Murdering! (1960)
- Legacy of the Incas (1965)

=== Actor ===
- Voices of Spring (1952)
- Adventure in Vienna (1952)
- Rose of the Mountain (1952)
- Knall and Fall as Imposters (1952)
- Three Lederhosen in St. Tropez (1980)

=== Director ===
- Mikosch of the Secret Service (1959)
- The Mystery of the Green Spider (1960)
- Tomfoolery in Zell am See (1963)
- Three Lederhosen in St. Tropez (1980)
- Sunshine Reggae in Ibiza (1983)

== Bibliography ==
- Goble, Alan. The Complete Index to Literary Sources in Film. Walter de Gruyter, 1999.
