= Shining Victory =

1941 film by Irving Rapper

- Movie poster
- Directed by: Irving Rapper
- Screenplay by: Howard Koch; Anne Froelick; Warren Duff; Guy Endore
- Based on: Jupiter Laughs; 1940 play by A. J. Cronin
- Produced by: Hal Wallis
- Starring: James Stephenson; Geraldine Fitzgerald; Donald Crisp; Barbara O'Neil
- Cinematography: James Wong Howe
- Edited by: Warren Low
- Music by: Max Steiner
- Production company: Warner Bros. Pictures
- Distributed by: Warner Bros. Pictures
- Release date: June 7, 1941
- Running time: 80 minutes
- Country: United States
- Language: English

Shining Victory is a 1941 American drama film directed by Irving Rapper and starring James Stephenson, Geraldine Fitzgerald, Donald Crisp and Barbara O'Neil. The film was produced and distributed by Warner Bros. Pictures. It was the first film directed by Rapper. It is based on the 1940 play Jupiter Laughs by A. J. Cronin. Bette Davis makes a brief cameo appearance as a nurse. The working title of the film was Winged Victory, but it was changed after it was discovered that Moss Hart was writing a play with this title. Hart's Winged Victory was filmed in 1944 by Twentieth Century Fox. Lead actor Stephenson died a month after the film premiered.

== Plot ==
Dr. Paul Venner, a brilliant research psychiatrist, is driven from Budapest by his superior, who has published and taken credit for Paul's work. In London, an old friend, Dr. Drewett, introduces him to the head of a Scottish sanatorium who offers him the opportunity to continue his research on dementia praecox, a disease from which Paul's father suffered.

Dr. Mary Murray becomes his laboratory assistant. They fall in love, but she plans to engage in medical missionary work in China in a year's time. Paul convinces her to remain with him, and the two become engaged. A fire breaks out in the lab, and Mary dies saving Paul's irreplaceable records. Heartbroken, Paul declines posts at several prestigious universities in order to realize Mary's dream of helping the sick in war-torn China.

== Cast ==
- James Stephenson as Dr. Paul Venner
- Geraldine Fitzgerald as Dr. Mary Murray
- Donald Crisp as Dr. Drewett
- Barbara O'Neil as Miss Leeming
- Montagu Love as Dr. Blake
- Sig Ruman as Professor Herman Von Reiter
- George Huntley Jr. as Dr. Thornton
- Richard Ainley as Dr. Hale
- Bruce Lester as Dr. Bentley
- Leonard Mudie as Mr. Foster
- Doris Lloyd as Mrs. Foster
- Frank Reicher as Dr. Esterhazy
- Hermine Sterler as Miss Hoffman
- Billy Bevan as Chivers
- Clare Verdera as Miss Dennis
- Crauford Kent as Dr. Corliss
- Ian Wolfe as Mr. Carew, a Banker
- Tempe Pigott as Miss Weatherby
- Mary Taylor as Mrs. Kent
- Bunny Beatty as Nancy Hormiston
- Alec Craig as Jeweller
- Louise Brien as Nurse
- Hilda Plowright as Nurse
- Ottola Nesmith as Nurse
- Bette Davis as Nurse
- Barlowe Borland as Patient
- Rudolph Anders as Police Officer
- Wolfgang Zilzer as Subordinate
- Claire Du Brey as Matron
- Paul Panzer as Mailman

== See also ==
- List of American films of 1941

== Bibliography ==
- Goble, Alan. The Complete Index to Literary Sources in Film. Walter de Gruyter, 1999.
- Fetrow, Alan G. Feature Films, 1940-1949: a United States Filmography. McFarland, 1994.
