= The Bellboy and the Playgirls =

1962 film

- Directed by: Francis Ford Coppola; Fritz Umgelter
- Written by: Dieter Hildebrandt; Margh Malina
- Produced by: Wolfgang Hartwig; Harry Ross
- Starring: June Wilkinson
- Cinematography: Paul Grupp
- Edited by: Jack Hill
- Music by: Claus Ogerman
- Release date: February 12, 1962
- Running time: 94 min. (US); 85 min. (West Germany)
- Country: U.S. / West Germany
- Languages: English & German

The Bellboy and the Playgirls is a 1962 American-West German Comedy film by Francis Ford Coppola and Jack Hill. The film is a re-edited version of a West German film of 1958 originally titled Sin Began with Eve, with Coppola and Hill shooting nudity inserted into the film for an American release.

== Plot ==
Dinah, an actress, refuses to be a part of seduction scene in front of a live audience. The director, Gregor, tries to convince her to complete the scene by telling her stories of sexual relations over the centuries. In the end, Dinah decides to complete the filming.

Coppola inserted scenes to the original German plot, adding the bellboy, George, who tries to spend some time with a room full of women.

== Production ==
The German production starring Karin Dor and Willy Fritsch was in black and white but Coppola said that he filmed around 15 minutes of footage in 3D and in color to add to the American release. The new footage featured nude women and took Coppola a few days to complete. Coppola said that the project was "adding five three-minute nudie sketches in color to a stupid German movie that had been shot in black-and-white". Al Locatelli designed the sets for the new segments while Jack Hill was the cinematographer. June Wilkinson, a Playboy Bunny, is featured in the segments. The 3-D footage was shot in Optavision and supervised by Richard Kay.

During the production one of the girls stated to Coppola that she was only 17 and that her father was going to kill her. Coppola responded with, "Well, you can keep your bra on," which resulted in him being reprimanded by the producer after he saw the completed film. Hill received $25 for his work on the film and Coppola received $250. Coppola was a student at the University of California, Los Angeles film school and his classmates did not agree with his choice of going into exploitation films. Coppola said, "I was called a cop-out, because I was willing to compromise".

The film print was believed to be lost after the film's initial release in 1962 and subsequent release on videotape but a collector of Coppola memorabilia had a print of the film. The book Godfather: The Intimate Francis Ford Coppola states that "Coppola's color footage is easily identifiable in the finished film" and that "the five Coppola sequences add up to nearly fifty minutes of screen time". A short time after the film's release, Coppola started working under Roger Corman.

== Release ==
The film's 3-D footage has been released by "3-D Rarities" on Blu-ray in a compilation entitled "3-D Rarities". The version included on the Blu-ray contains no nudity.

== See also ==
- List of American films of 1962
