= Walter Gross (actor) =

German actor (1904–1989)

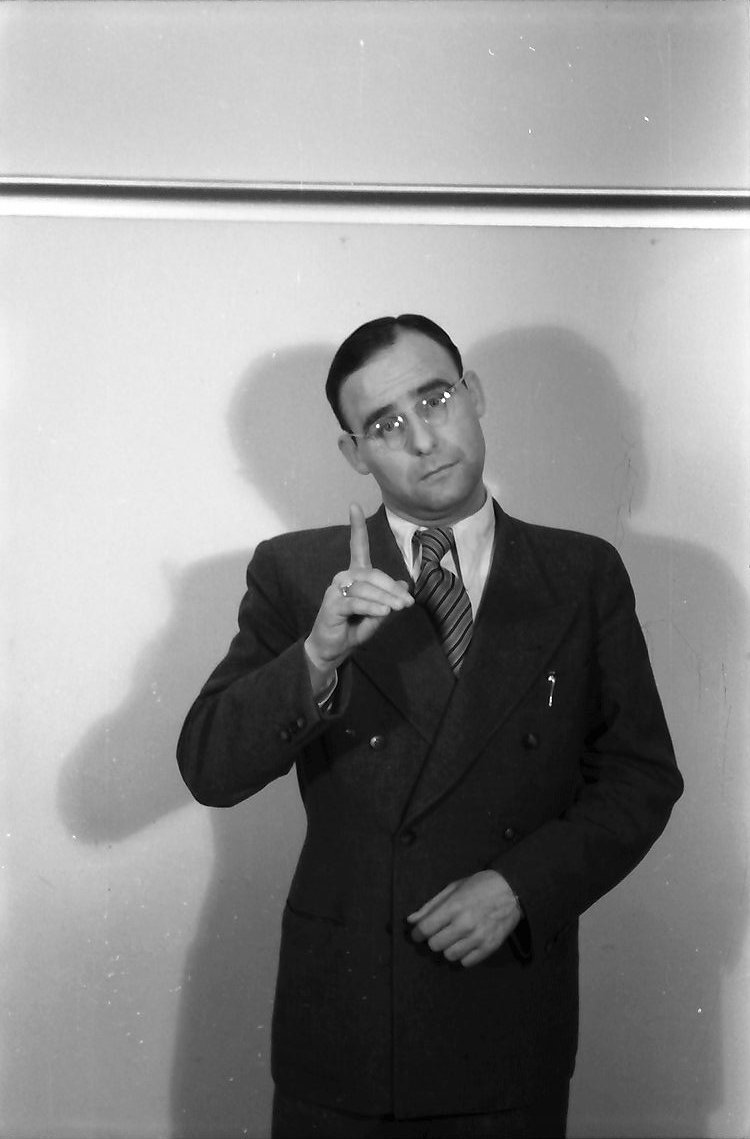
- Walter Gross in 1939
- Born: Walter Hugo Gross; 5 February 1904; Eberswalde, German Empire
- Died: 17 May 1989 (aged 85); West Berlin, West Germany
- Occupation: Actor
- Years active: 1933–1989

Walter Hugo Gross (5 February 1904 – 17 May 1989) was a German actor. He appeared in more than one hundred films from 1933 to 1989.

== Selected filmography ==
Year	Title	Role	Notes
1974	Auch ich war nur ein mittelmäßiger Schüler	Oskar Kunzfeld	
1974	One or the Other of Us	Grandfather Melzer	
1962	The Turkish Cucumbers	Theo-Maria Neumann	
1962	Aurora Marriage Bureau	Herr Bolwieser	
1961	Kauf dir einen bunten Luftballon	Josef	
1960	Conny and Peter Make Music	Maegerli	
1958	Two Hearts in May	Julius Krüger	
1958	The Green Devils of Monte Cassino		
1958	Mikosch, the Pride of the Company	Max Sperling	
1957	Drei Mann auf einem Pferd	Felix	
1956	If We All Were Angels	Robert	
1955	The Last Man	Kellner Otto	
1953	Wedding in Transit	Gabor	
1952	Homesick for You	Paulchen Friese	
1951	Queen of the Night	Ganove	
1951	It Began at Midnight		
1950	The Reluctant Maharaja	Verkäufer	
1949	Quartet of Five	Schelleboom	
1947	Quax in Africa		
1946	Under the Bridges		
1945	The Man in the Saddle	Arzt	
1943	Back Then		
1943	Melody of a Great City		
1939	Renate in the Quartet	Varieté-Regisseur	
1939	Shoulder Arms		
1939	D III 88		
1938	The Stars Shine		
1938	Adventure in Love		
1937	Capers		
1936	The Hour of Temptation	Billy Miller	
1935	Regine		
1934	An Evening Visit		
1934	Police Report	Schmidt	
1934	Hearts are Trumps	Hans-Joachim Müller	
1934	Rivalen der Luft		
