= Veli Can =

Ottoman painter in saz style

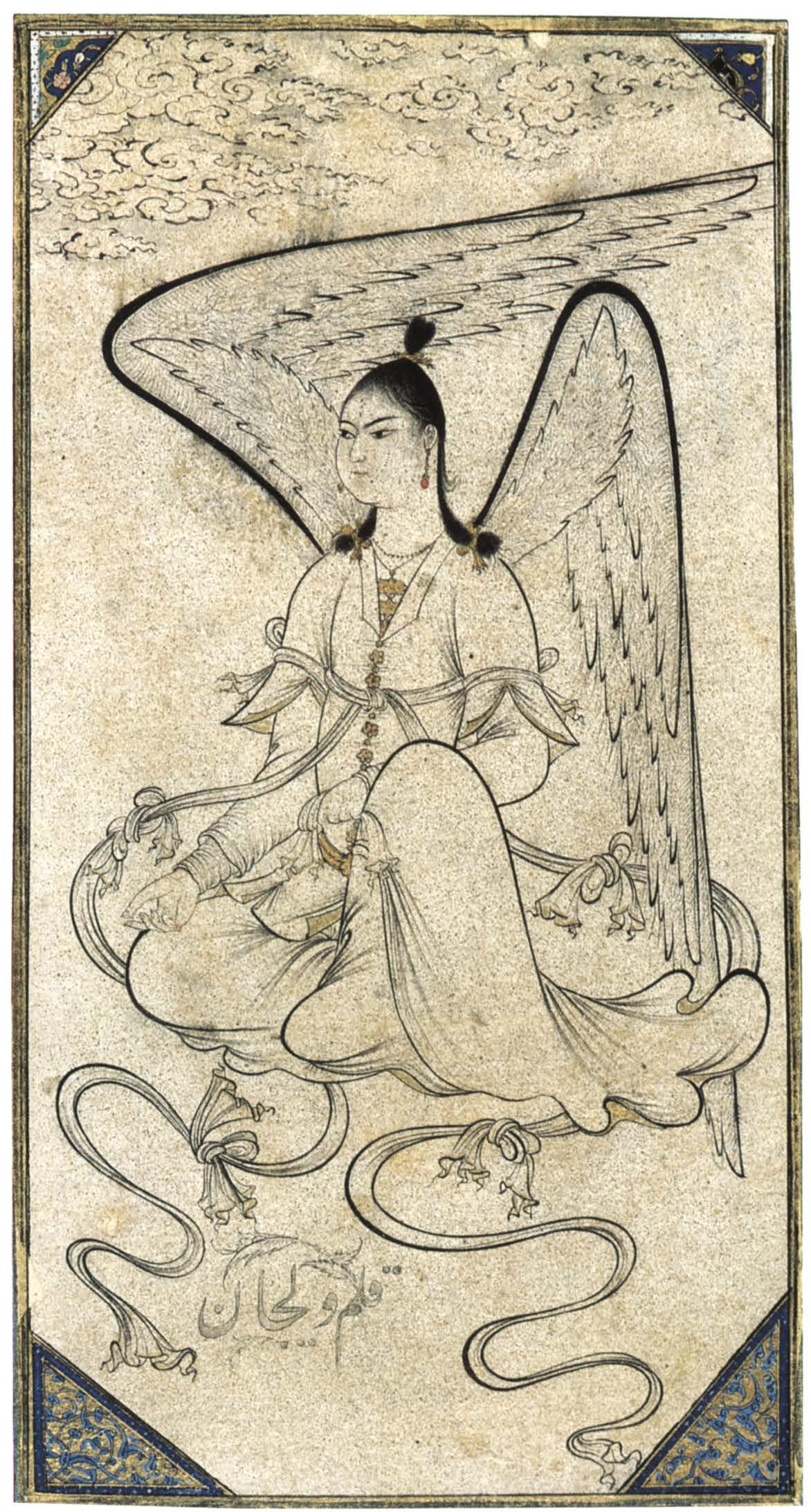
Seated peri. Miniature from an album (muraqqa) in Topkapı Palace Library, H. 2162, fol. 8v

Veli Can (Persian form: Vali Jan) (fl. c. 1580 to c. 1600) was an Ottoman painter known for his works in saz style.

Born in Tabriz, according to Mustafa Ali he was a student of Siyavush and came to Istanbul (c. 1580). Under Murad III (1574–1595) saz style (from saz: "reed"; long, feathery leaf which was the basic element of the compositions) reached its apogee. Veli Can is the most prominent of the later 16th-century painters associated with the albums compiled for Murad III. He worked for the sultan, and album pages are, "more or less speculatively attributed to him". To judge from these, he was primarily interested in figural subjects. The large number of dubious attributions to Veli Can had made the definition of his style impossible until Denny discovered a tiny hidden signature on a drawing of a bird and a grotesque head in a foliage (Topkapı Pal. Lib., H. 2836, see illustration). From this drawing, he has convincingly assigned Veli Can three other drawings (Topkapı Pal. Lib., H. 2147, fol. 23v and H. 2162, fol. 8v (see illustrations); Mus. Jacquemart-André, MS. 261). According to Sheila R. Canby: "The rounded serrations of the leaf edges and bold, black sweeping lines that form the spines of the leaves place these drawings squarely in the saz [style] .... The grotesque head in Veli Can’s signed drawing, however, is clearly borrowed from the style of his mentor".

Mustafa Ali claimed that, despite Veli Can's gifts as a draughtsman, his style did not progress. His name appears in the registers of the palace workshop for 1595–6 and 1596–7 with a daily salary of seven and nine akçe, a mediocre sum, which bears out Mustafa Ali's assessment. Veli Can is mostly known for his angel (peri) figures in the style of Shah Quli and the figures of young men in the tradition of his mentor Siyavush. His name became famous in the world of Ottoman art and "appear to have wrought a particular magic on the price structure in the marketplace". Veli Can was the historical template for the character "Olive" in novel My Name Is Red by Orhan Pamuk.

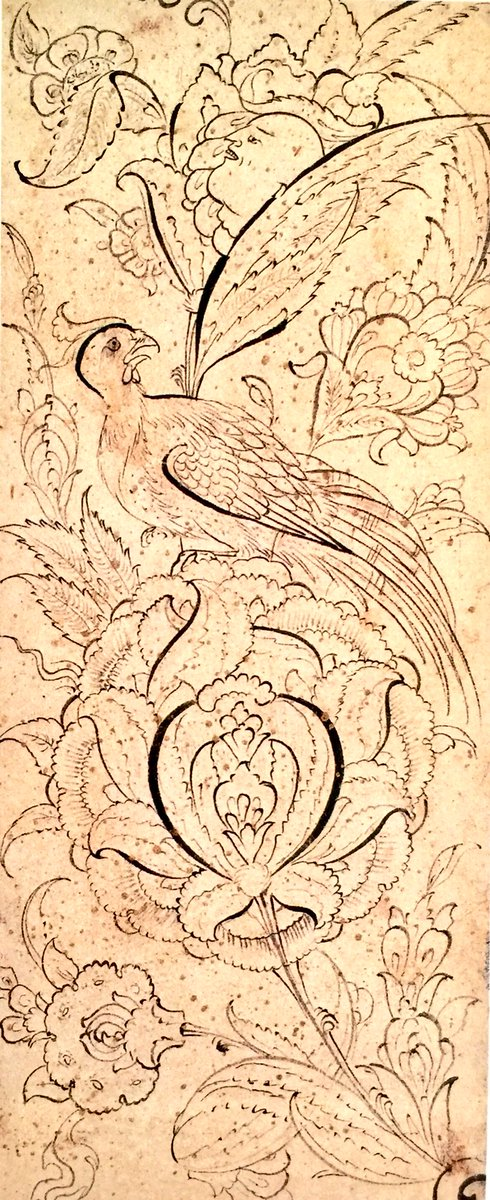
Ornamental drawing, signed "Vali Jan". Istanbul, c. 1580-90. This is the only known work with an authentic signature of Veli Can, in a flower in the upper left corner of the drawing. Topkapı Palace Library

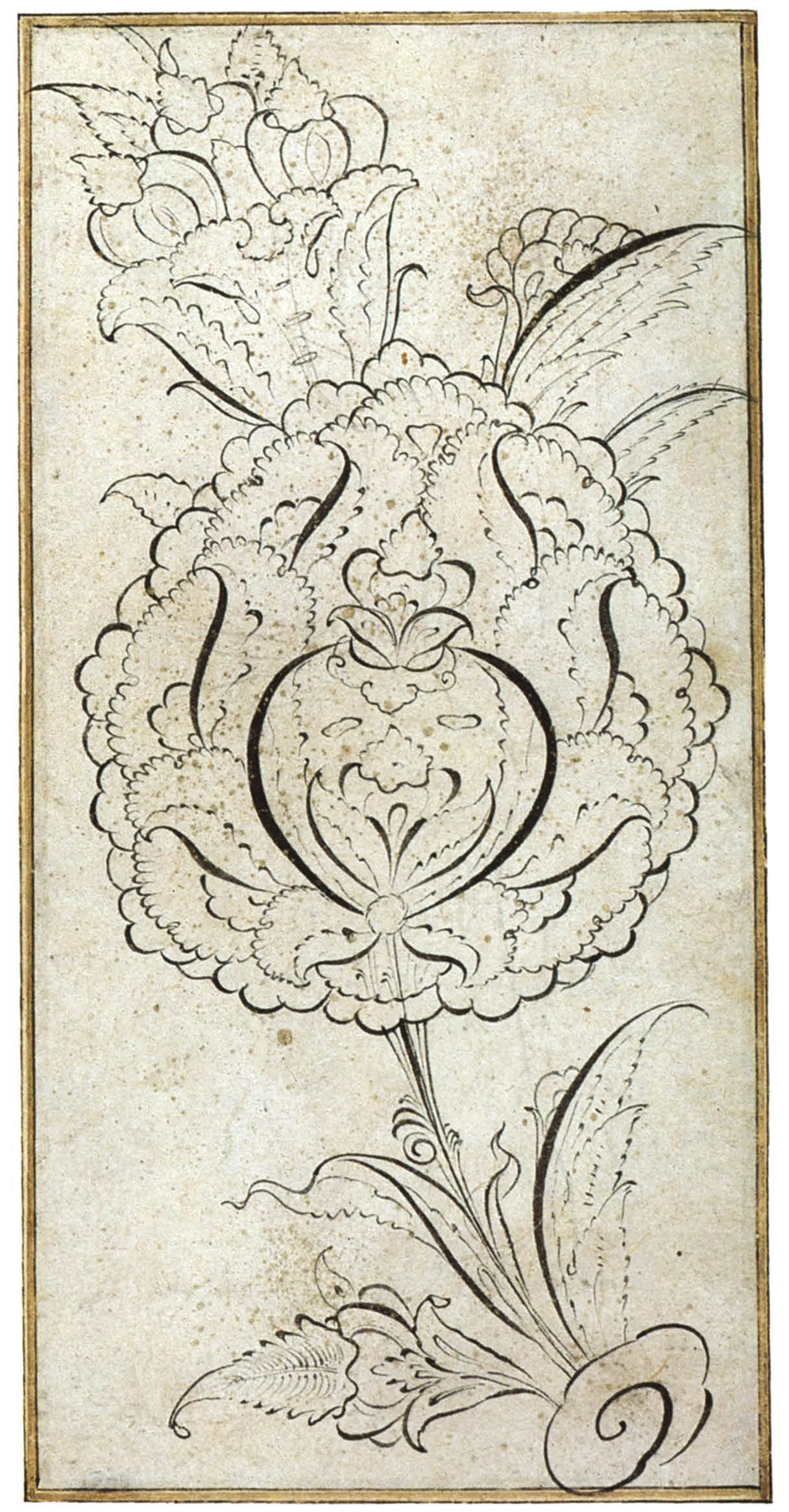
Ornamental drawing of a palmette, from an album (muraqqa) in Topkapı Palace Library, H. 2147 f. 23v

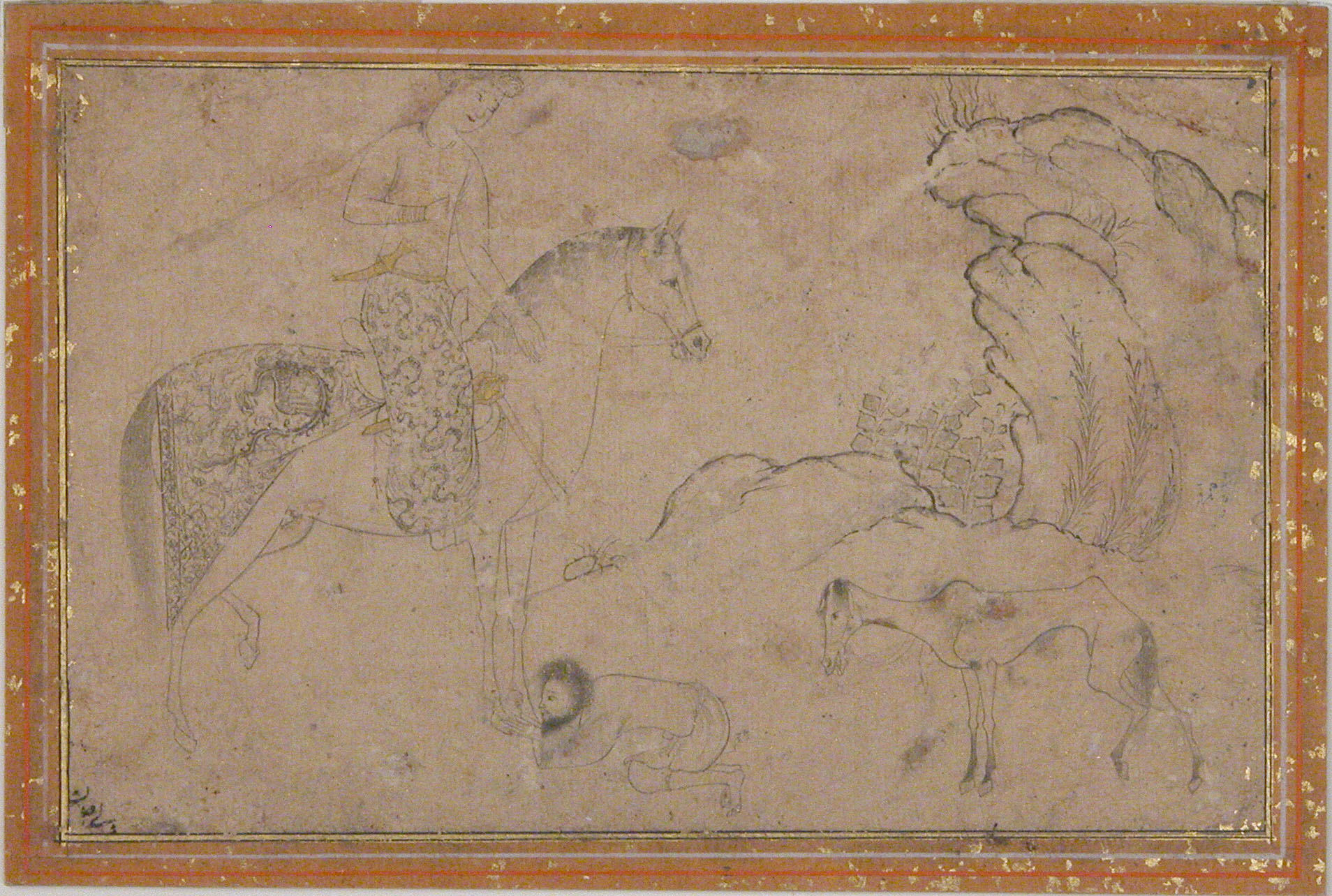
The Prince and the Petitioner. Based on an original by Sultan Mohammed. Metropolitan Museum of Art

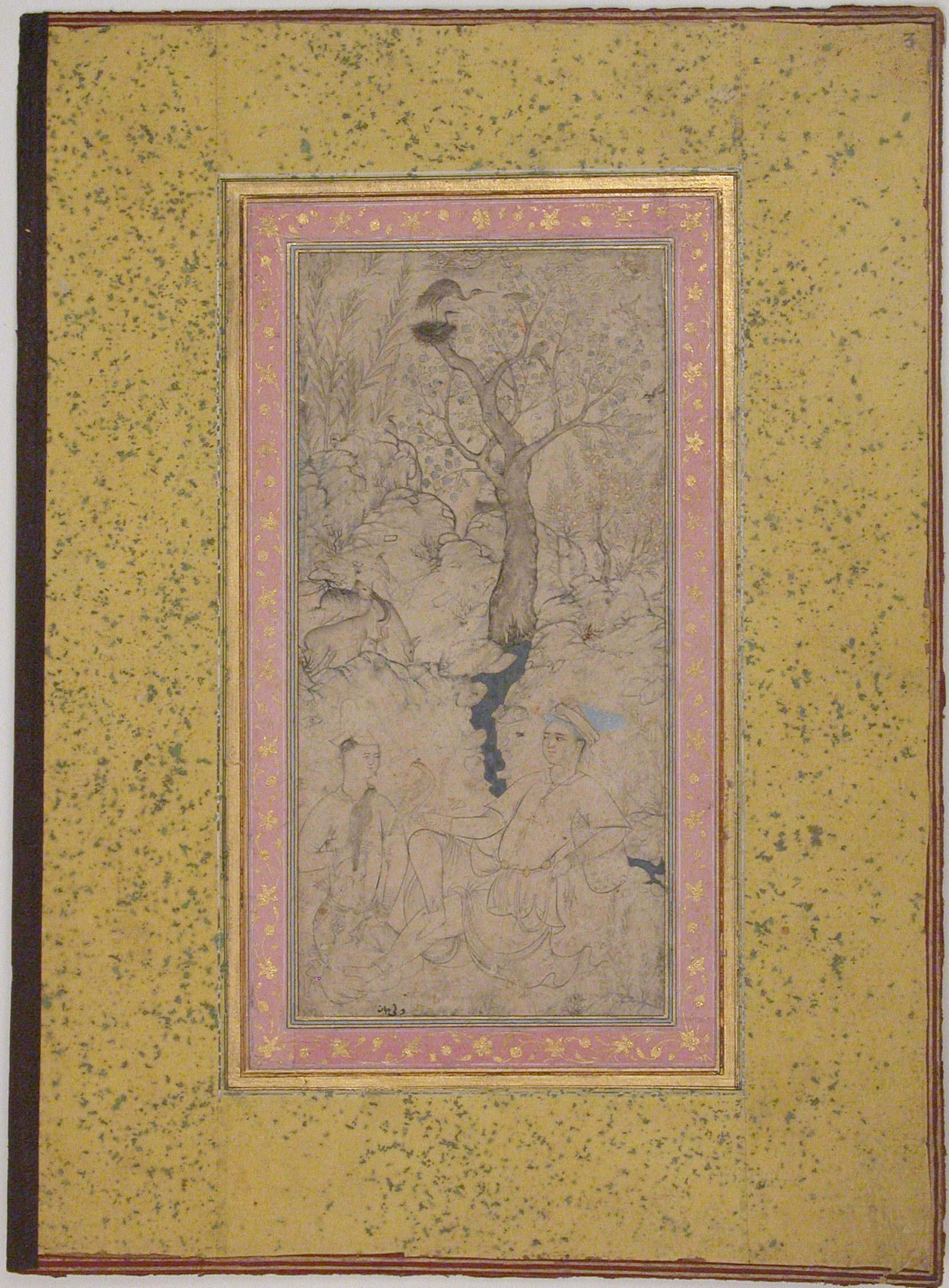
Youthful Falconers in a Landscape. Metropolitan Museum of Art

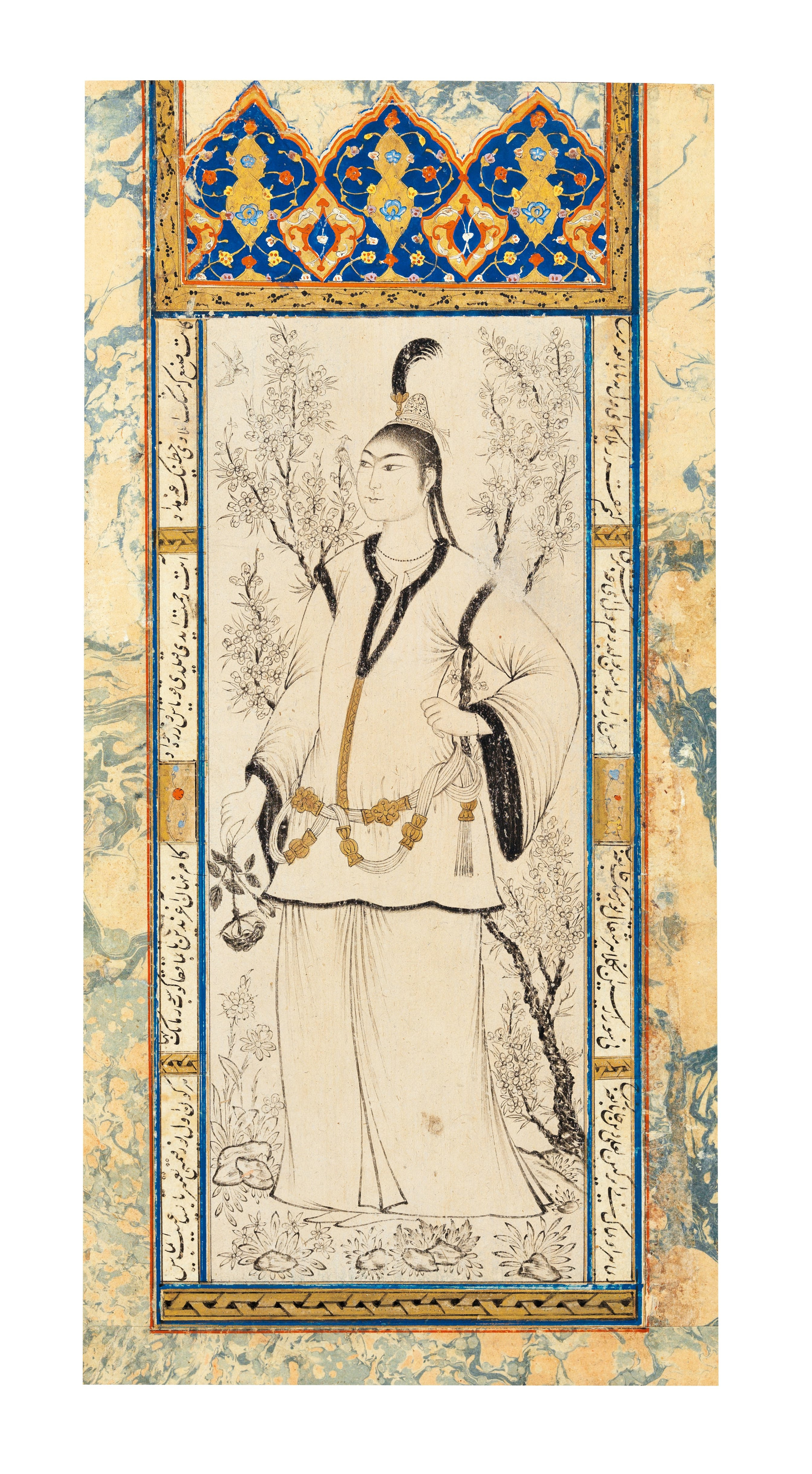
Portrait of a Woman. Ottoman miniature by Veli Can or another artist of his circle, ca. 1585. Sadberk Hanım Museum

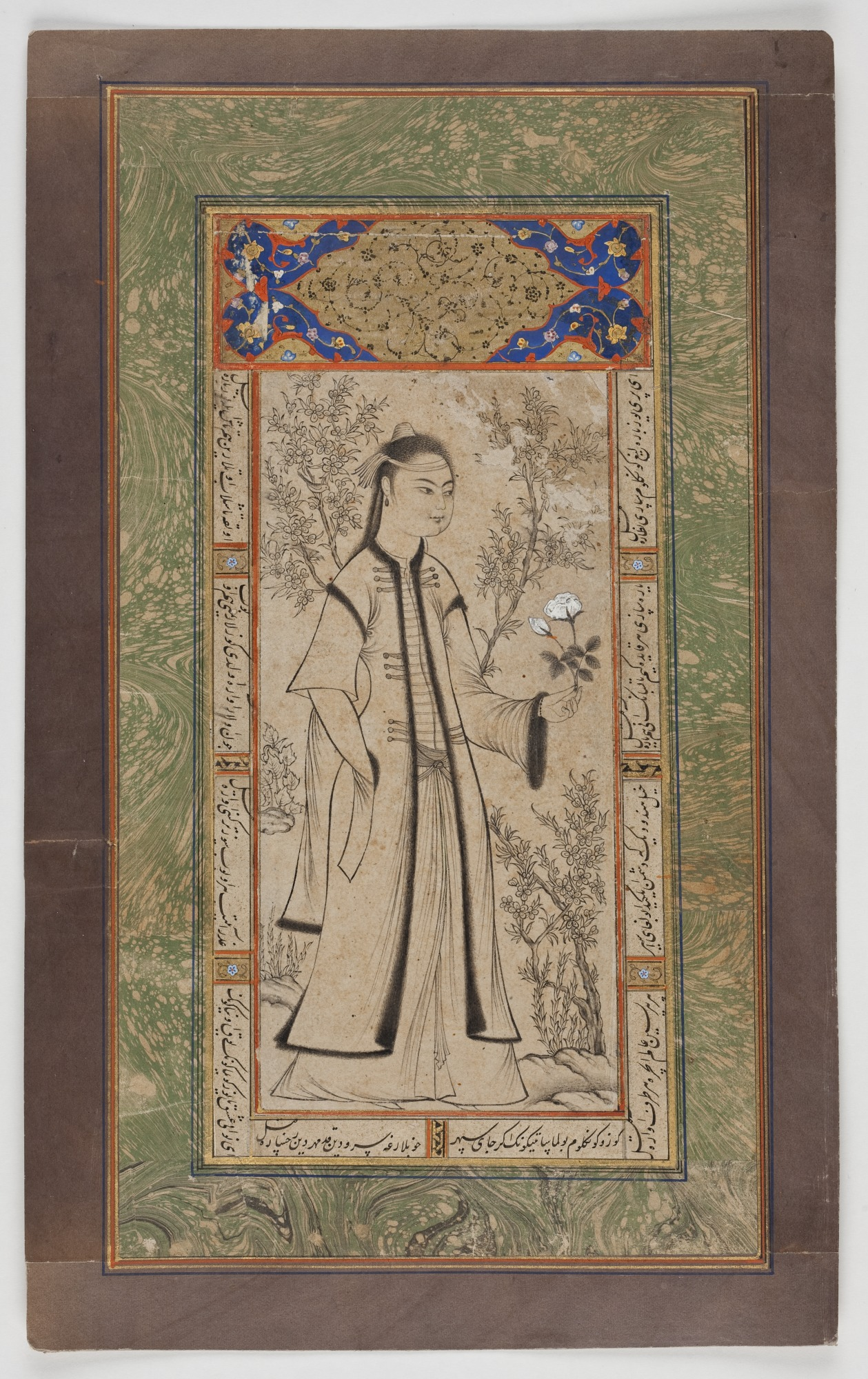
Lady with a Rose. Possibly school of Veli Can. Detroit Institute of Arts

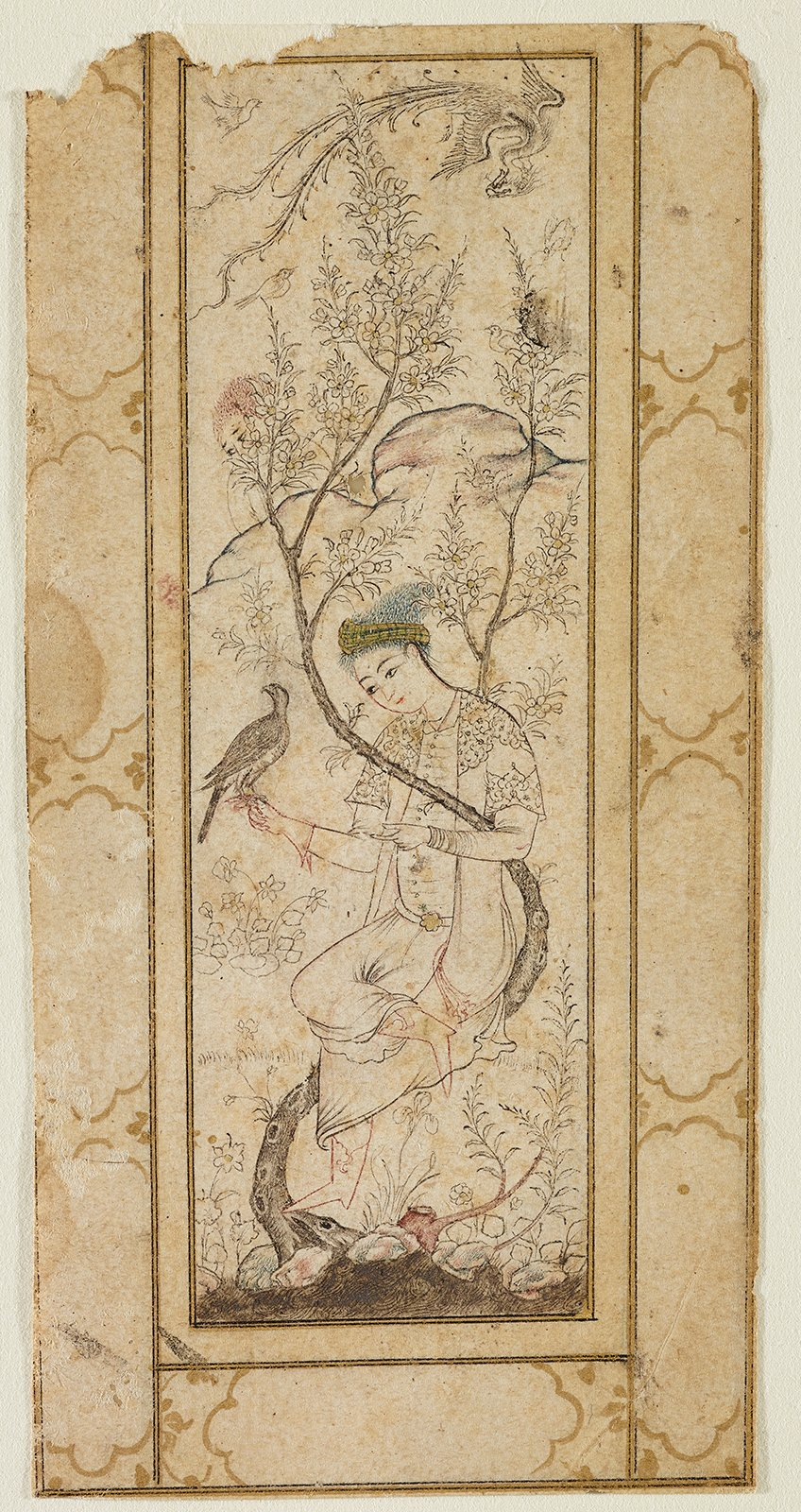
Young Falconer. Drawing in the style of Veli Can, ca. 1580. Aga Khan Museum

== Bibliography ==
- Akin-Kivanç, Esra (2011). Mustafa Âli's Epic Deeds of Artists. Brill. ISBN 978-90-47-44107-6.
- Sheila R. Canby (2003). "Veli Can [Valī Jān]". Grove Art Online. doi:10.1093/gao/9781884446054.article.T088521.
- Denny, Walter B. (1983). "Dating Ottoman Turkish Works in the Saz Style". Muqarnas. 1: 103–121. doi:10.2307/1523074. JSTOR 1523074.
