= The Merry Wives of Windsor (1965 film) =

1965 Austrian-British film

- Directed by: Georg Tressler
- Written by: William Shakespeare (play); Norman Foster; Otto Nicolai; Georg Tressler
- Produced by: Norman Foster
- Starring: Norman Foster; Colette Boky; Charles Igor Gorin
- Cinematography: Hannes Staudinger
- Edited by: Paula Dvorak
- Music by: Otto Nicolai
- Production companies: Wien-Film; B.H.E. Productions Ltd
- Release date: February 1965
- Running time: 97 minutes
- Countries: Austria; United Kingdom
- Language: German

The Merry Wives of Windsor (German: Die lustigen Weiber von Windsor) is a 1965 Austrian-British historical comedy film directed by Georg Tressler and starring Norman Foster, Colette Boky and Charles Igor Gorin. It was written by Foster and Tressler as a film musical adaptation of Otto Nicolai's opera after Shakespeare's play.

== Cast ==
- Norman Foster as Sir John Falstaff
- Colette Boky as Mistress Ford
- Charles Igor Gorin as Mr. Ford
- Mildred Miller as Mistress Page
- Lucia Popp as Mistress Ann
- John Gittings as Dr. Cajus
- Rosella Hightower as Ballerina
- Edmond Hurshell as Herr Reich
- Marshall Reynor as Spärlich
- Ernst Schütz as Fenton

== Reception ==
Variety wrote: "All in all, it's a fast-running pic with a series of pleasant optical and scenic gags. ... Also this Austrian production may be termed an interesting document for it gives opera lovers in distant areas the opportunity to see a first-class opera production. In addition, it is something for future generations. The singers are excellent. In particular, this goes for Foster and Colette Boky. Latter, a Canadian soprano, is also an optical treat. ... Austrian Georg Tressler has contributed a competent directorial job within limits. The camera work deserves compliments, too."

== Bibliography ==
- Eddie Sammons. Shakespeare: A Hundred Years on Film. Scarecrow Press, 2004.
