= Ana Raquel Satre =

- Also known as: Mimi
- Born: 1925
- Died: November 18, 2014 (aged 88 or 89) Lanzarote, Las Palmas, Canary Isles
- Genres: Opera

Ana Raquel Satre (1925 – 18 November 2014)—nicknamed 'Mimi'—was a Uruguayan operatic mezzo-soprano.

== Biography ==
Satre was born in Uruguay and studied with French soprano Ninon Vallin at the Conservatorio Nacional in Montevideo. Her first success came at an early age when she was chosen to sing in Cimarosa's Il matrimonio segreto at the Montevideo Opera House. She subsequently appeared in South America singing the title role in Peri's Euridice, Fiordiligi in Così fan tutte and Cleopatra in Handel's Giulio Cesare.

Satre's first European appearances were at the Wigmore Hall in London, as part of Lies Askonas’ Voices of Tomorrow recital series, and as Euridice in Gluck's Orfeo, opposite Gérard Souzay in the title role, with the Aix-en-Provence Festival. She then went on Barcelona; La Fenice; Venice; La Monnaie; Brussels; and was invited by Gian Carlo Menotti to take part in the Spoleto and Madrid Festivals. She toured Australia with the Elizabethan Theatre Trust appearing in Sydney, Melbourne, Brisbane and Perth and at the Adelaide Festival, as Donna Elvira in Don Giovanni and Violetta in La traviata, for which she was awarded the 1963 Opera Medal of the Harriet Cohen International Music Awards.

In addition to her operatic work, Satre toured extensively as a recitalist in Great Britain, most notably with Gerald Moore at the King's Lynn Festival in the presence of the Queen Mother, and in Austria, France, Italy, and North and South America. For Decca, she recorded Alisa in Lucia di Lammermoor, Lola in Cavalleria rusticana and Emilia in Otello with Mario del Monaco and Renata Tabaldi.

In 1963, Satre interpreted Judith in a film version of Bartók's Bluebeard's Castle, recorded in German for Stuttgart Television and in English for world release, and directed by Michael Powell.

Satre sang under conductors that included Paul Paray, Lamberto Baldi, Tulio Serafin, Georges Prêtre, Sir John Pritchard, Sir Charles Mackerras, Eric Simon and Herbert von Karajan.

In January 1962 she married the classical guitarist Patrick Bashford; they had a son, Roderick, who lived with Satre in Paris following her separation from Bashford in the 1980s. She died on 18 November 2014 in Lanzarote, in the Canary Isles.

== Recordings ==
- Emilia in Otello by Giuseppe Verdi, conducted by Herbert von Karajan with the Vienna Philharmonic Orchestra (Decca 1961, 411618)
- Lola in Cavalleria rusticana by Pietro Mascagni, conducted by Tullio Serafin with the Rome Santa Cecilia Academy Orchestra (Decca)

== Films ==
- Herzog Blaubarts Burg (Bluebeard's Castle) (1963)
