= Saz style =

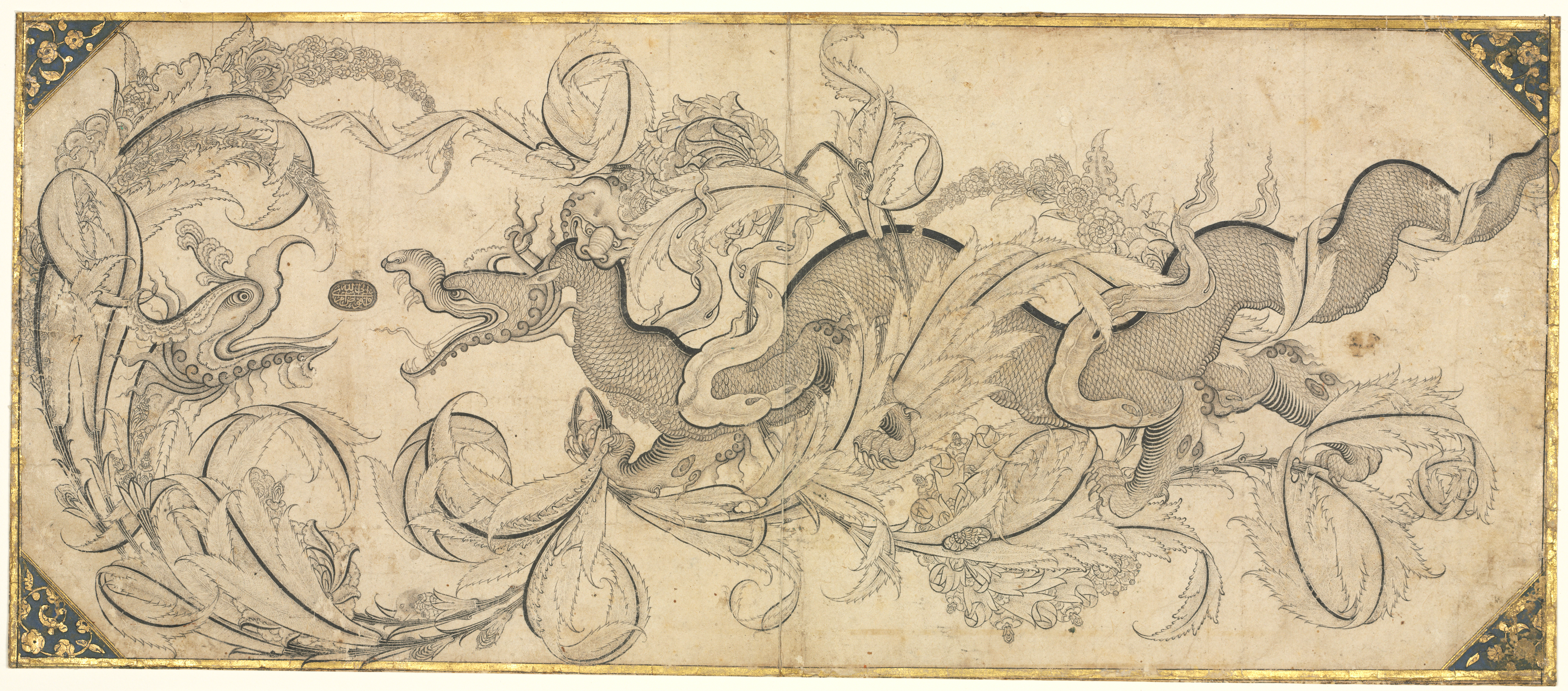
This drawing of dragon entangled in swirling foliage under attack from a lion above while assaulting a phoenix is "certainly the greatest masterpiece of the [saz] style" and is attributed to Şahkulu.

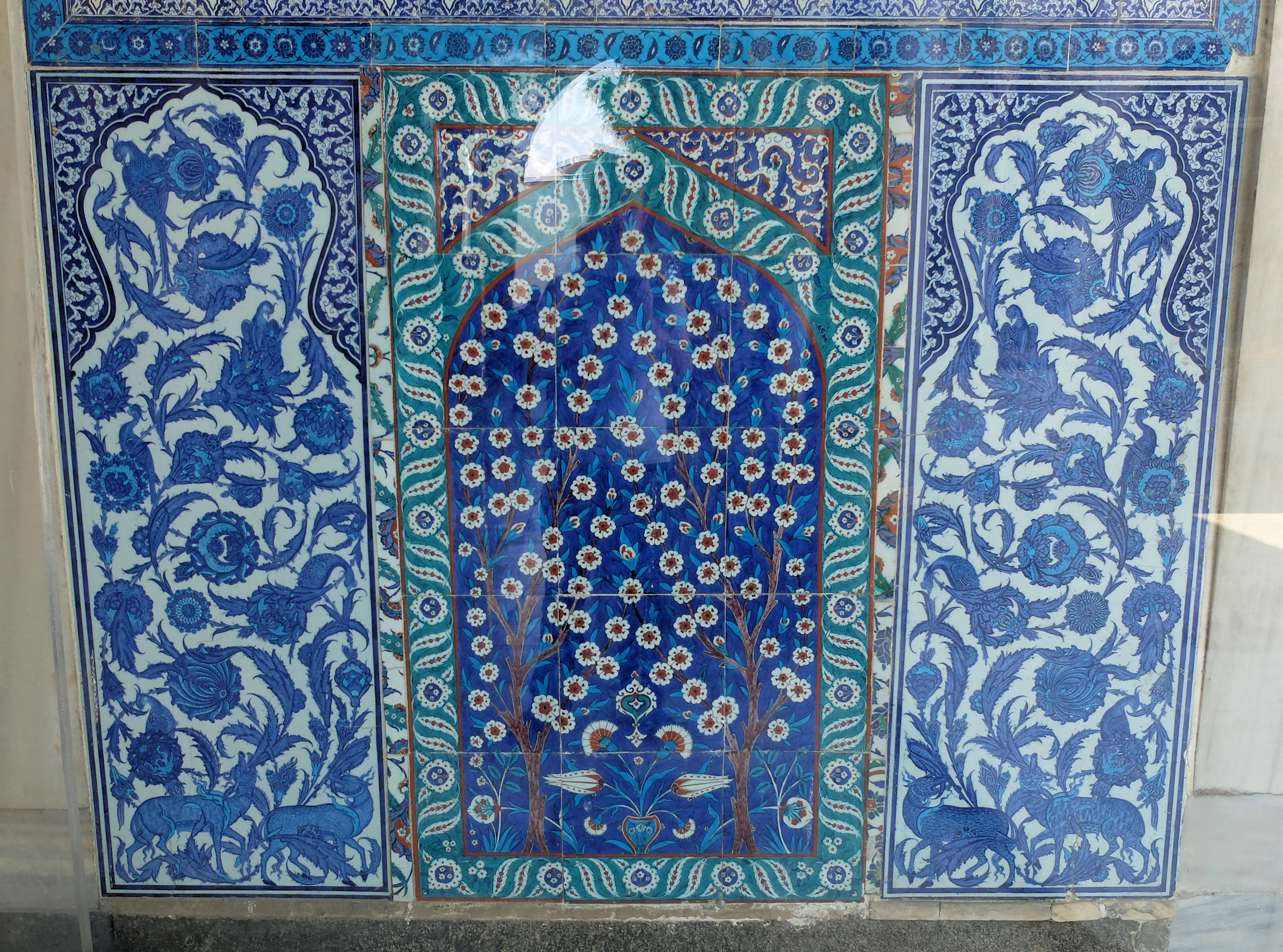
Tiles covering the Sünnet Odasi (Circumcision Room) in Topkapi Palace are considered to be one of the earliest examples of the saz style. Featuring birds and Chinese qilins among feathery saz leaves, lotus palmettes and rosettes they reproduce designs known from albums (muraqqa) and are dated to c. 1530 on stylistic and technical grounds. This close resemblance between the saz style as practiced in album painting and in ceramics could only have been achieved through the close cooperation between ceramicists and court designers (which is attested in the court account books from 1527–1528), and "painted panels betray the hand of a master, who may might well have been Şahkulu himself".

Saz style (Turk. saz yolu) is a style of vegetal ornament and an associated art style from the 16th-century Ottoman Empire.

== Name and identity ==
Saz was a style of vegetal ornament popular in Ottoman decorative arts of the 16th century CE, characterized by the use of long, feathery sawtoothed leaves and composite blossoms. At the same time, saz is also used as a name for the art style, in which saz ornament was a basic element of the compositions.

Contrary to the better known historical style of Ottoman painting, saz style served no direct illustrative purpose, and therefore might be described as lyrical. Its works are fantastic and virtuosic displays of technique using the saz qalami, or reed pen, that gave this group of works its name. Saz style is represented by two distinct groups of artistic products. The first "consists of album drawings, book illumination, and other works on paper; the second, derived from these paper images, includes virtually all the Ottoman decorative art forms, from bookbinding through textiles, carpets, metalwork, stonecarving, and ceramics"

== History ==
Saz style "in which mythical creatures derived from Chinese or Islamic sources move through an enchanted forest made up of oversized composite blossoms and feathery leaves, has parallels in the art of the Aqqoyunlu and Safavid courts at Tabriz". It is no coincidence that two named artists associated with it, Şahkulu and Veli Can, both came to Istanbul from Tabriz, in c. 1520 and 1580 respectively. Şahkulu played a great role in the formation of saz style, and Veli Can took part in its later phase. According to Walter B. Denny, there is a great difference between the early and later phases of the saz style. The clarity, spontaneity and almost reckless qualities of earlier drawings gave way to a concern for finish, texture and far more balanced composition. Apart from saz ornament, drawings in saz style used many other motifs, often derived from China, which formed compositions of complex foliage usually intertwined with birds, beasts, and cloud bands. For them, Turkish scholars use the term hatayi, or "in the Cathayan manner". Chinese mythological creatures include the dragon, phoenix and Qilin, other creatures like the simurgh or peri (in Western sources often called angels) are borrowed from Iranian tradition. One of the specific motifs is the "suicidal" leaf, which, twisted, pierces itself. Veli Can seems to be primarily interested in figural subjects, and apart from figures of peri, he is associated with many pictures of young men and women.

Although it started during the reign of Suleiman (1520–1566), from whom Şahkulu received many favours, the saz style reached its apogee under Murad III (1574–1595), for example in an album (muraqqa) compiled for the future sultan in 1572–1573 (Österreich. Nbib., Cod. Mixt. 313). Murad III was the most important patron of the style and his death in 1595, accompanied by ongoing deterioration of court workshops in time of price revolution, resulted in its decline. After 1600 the saz style ceased to be an important, but still, it showed an amazing tenacity. Because it had become virtually synonymous with the glorious days of the Ottoman Empire, it was the subject of self-conscious attempts at revival, for example in tiles of Baghdad Kiosk in the 1630s or painted-wood decorations of the kiosk attached to the Valide Mosque in c. 1663. Countless bookbindings and endpapers kept the tradition alive into the nineteenth century, and its widespread diffusion have left imprints as diverse as decorations of Aleppo Room (in Museum of Islamic Art, Berlin) or patterned "bizarre silks" woven in France in the early eighteenth century.

== Gallery ==
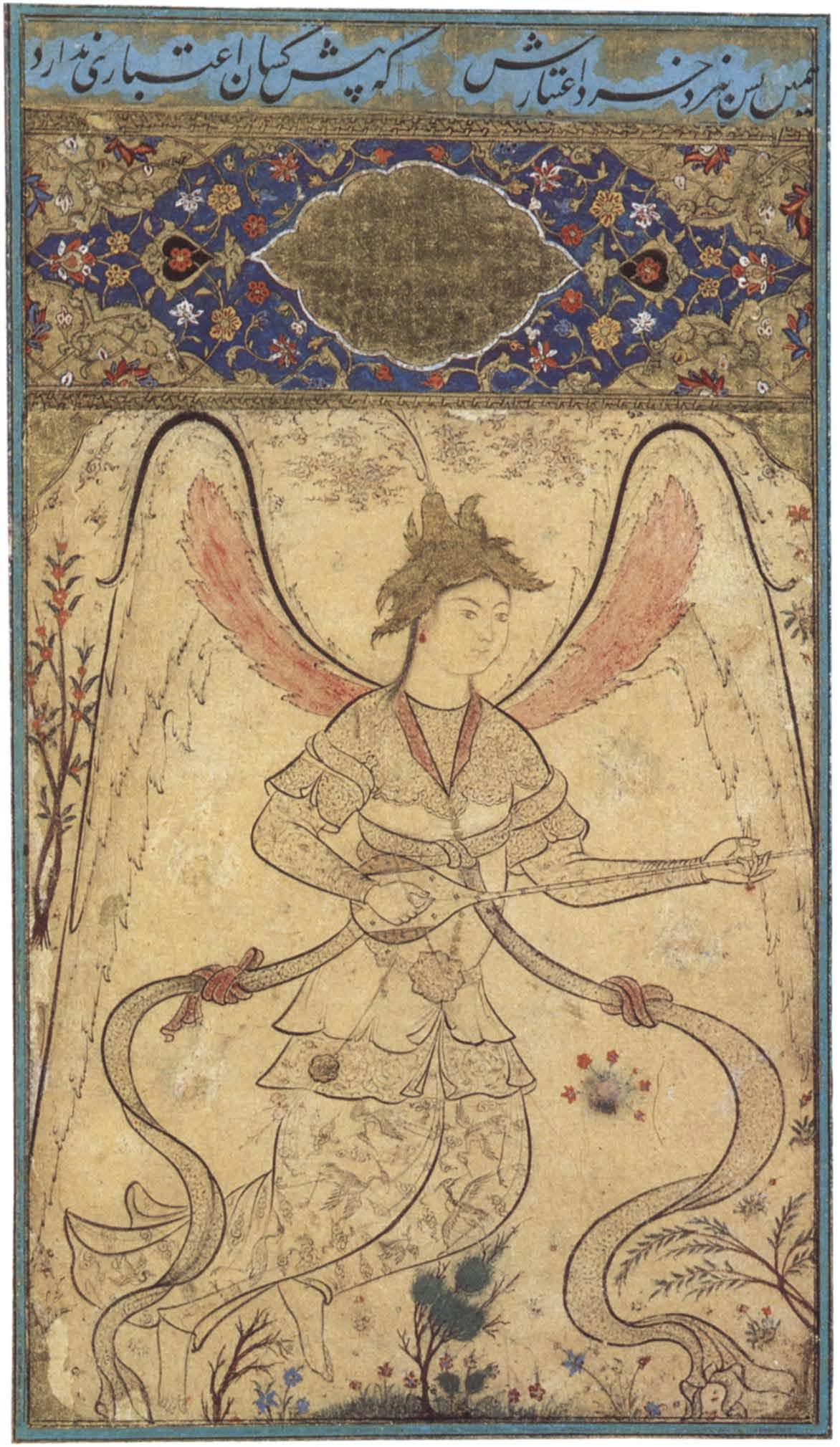
Peri with a lute. Unknown artist, c. 1550. From an album in Topkapı Palace Library

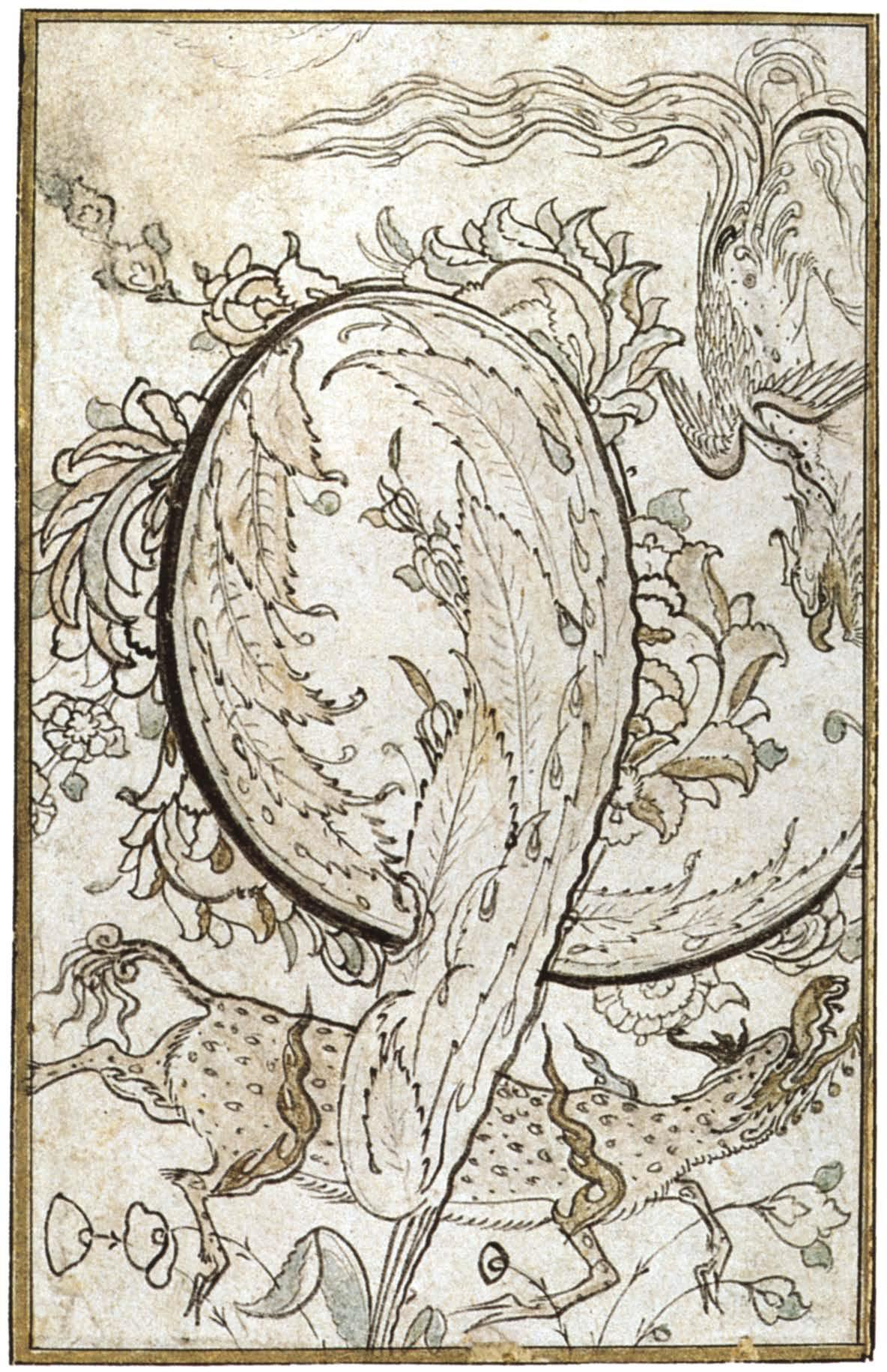
Floral composition with suicidal leaf, Simurgh and Qilin. Unknown artist, from an album in Topkapı Palace Library

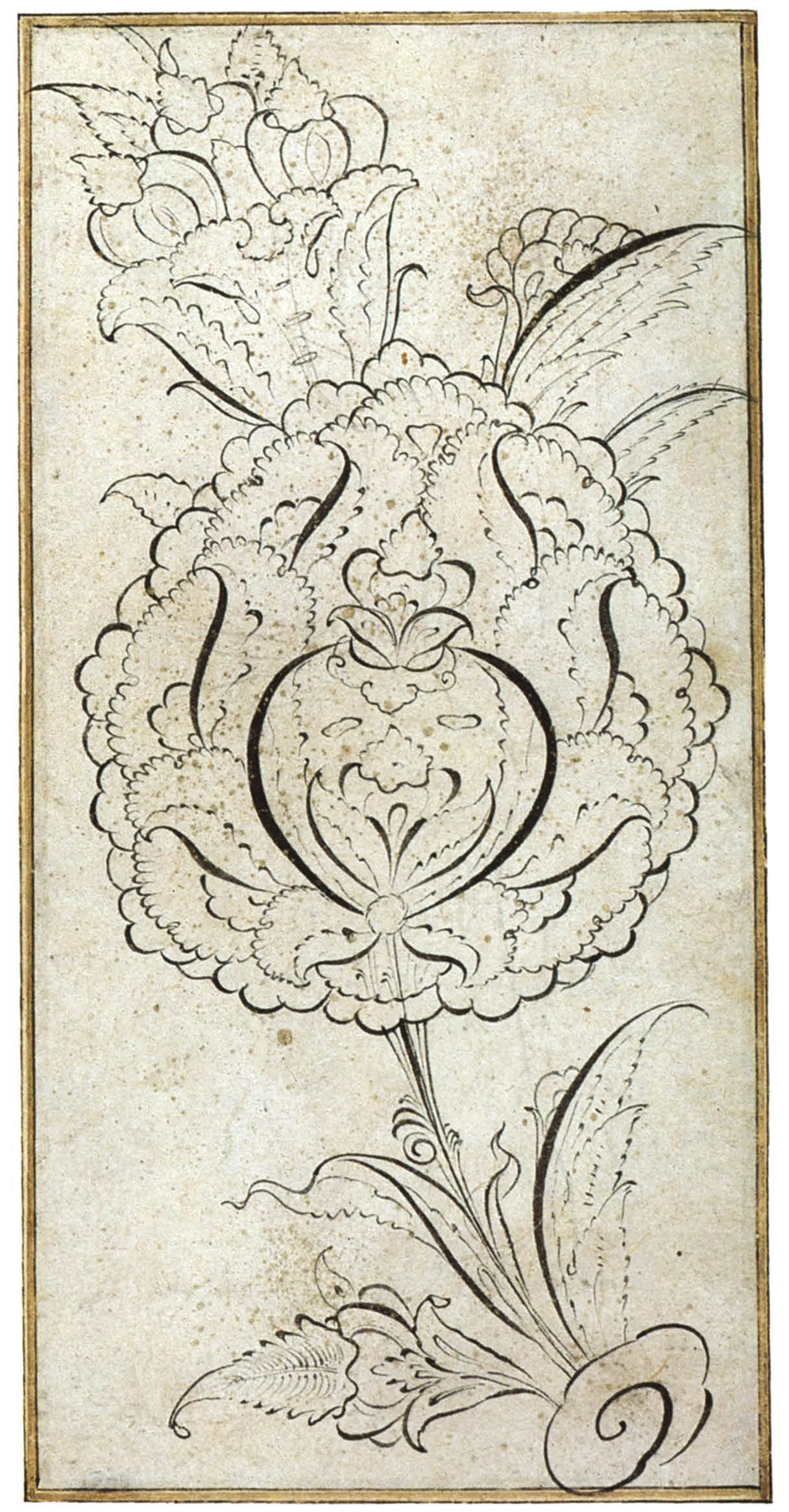
Ornamental drawing of a palmette (hatayi), attributed to Veli Can. From an album in Topkapı Palace Library

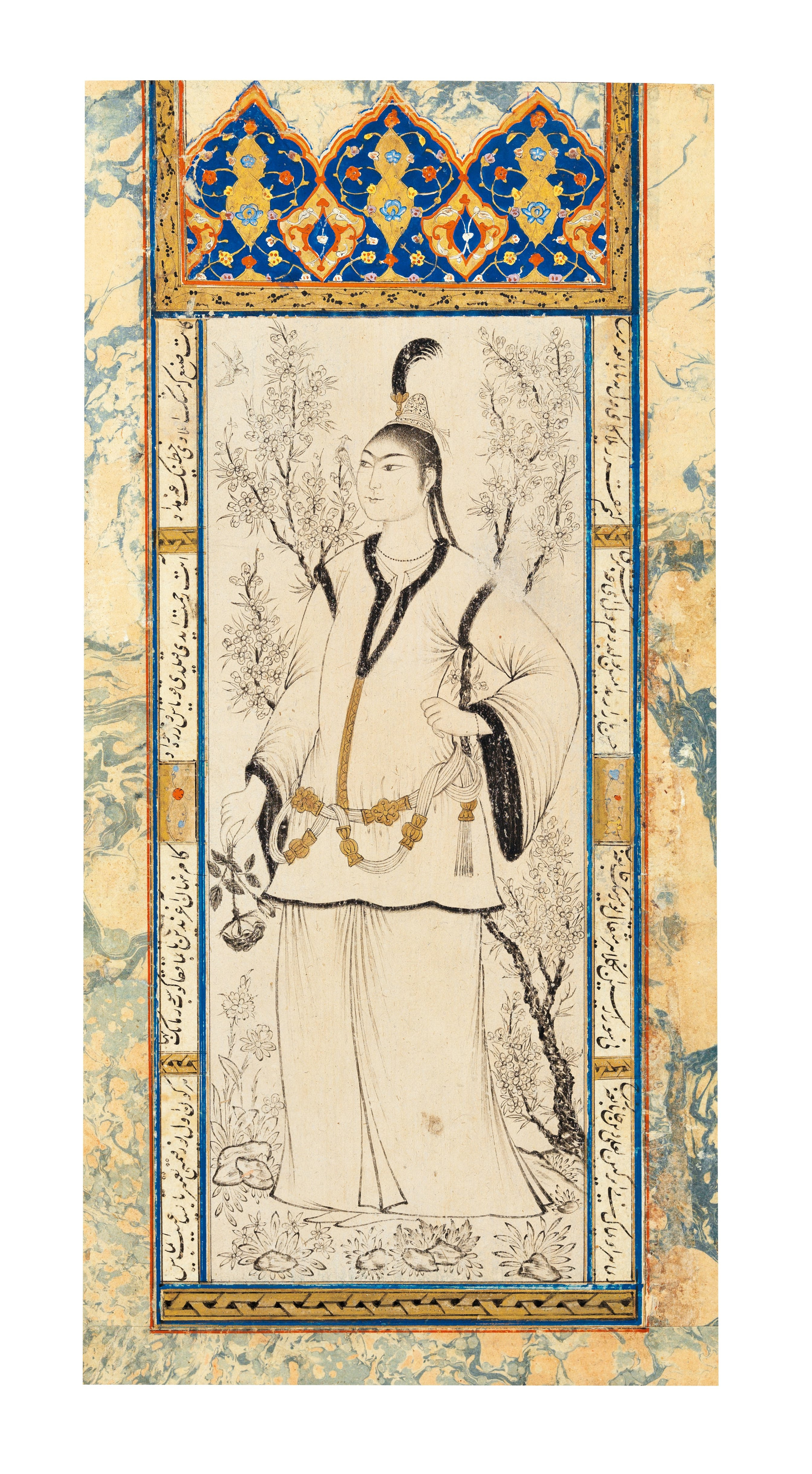
Portrait of a Woman, by Veli Can or another artist of his circle, c. 1585. Sadberk Hanım Museum

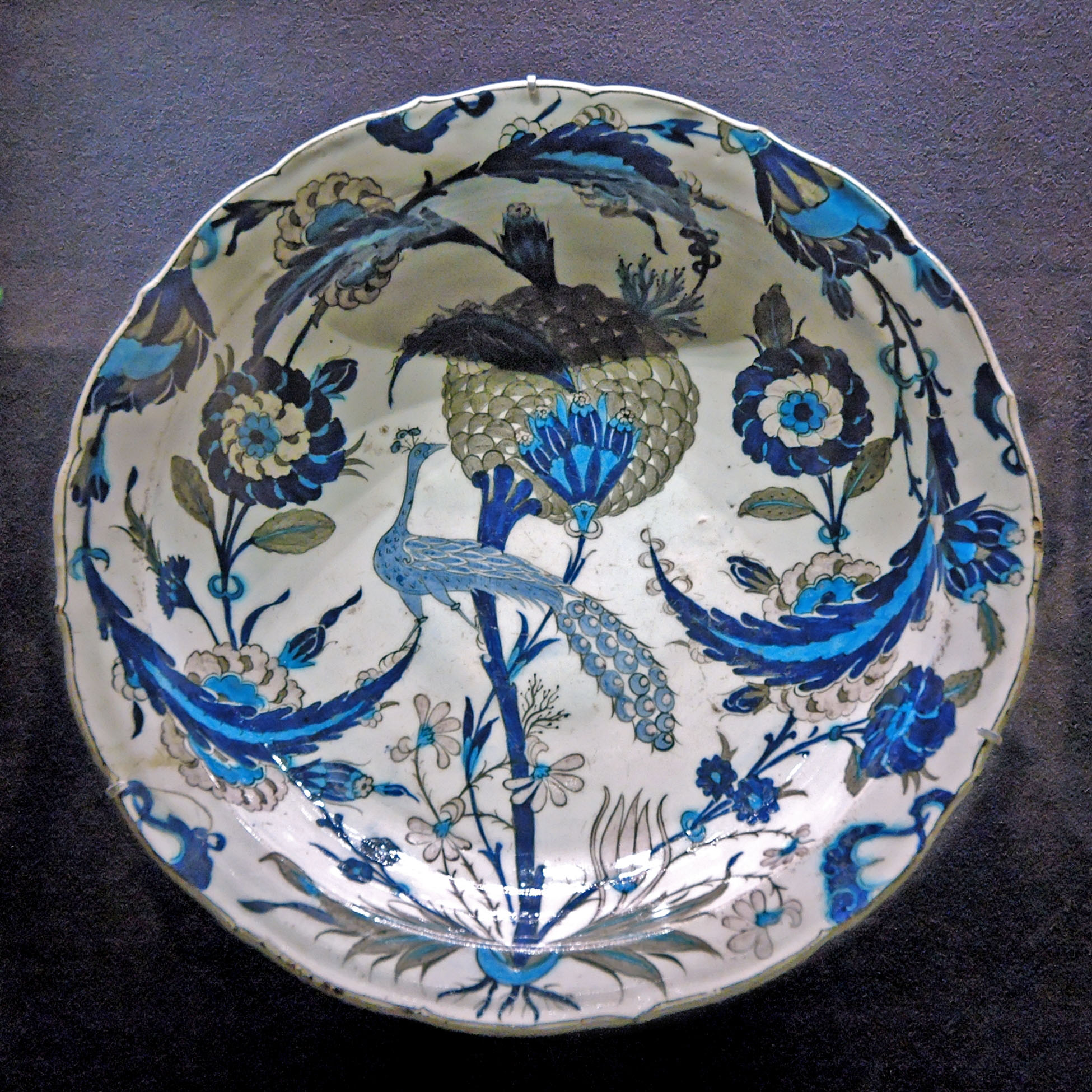
Iznik "Peacock Dish", c. 1540–1555. Louvre

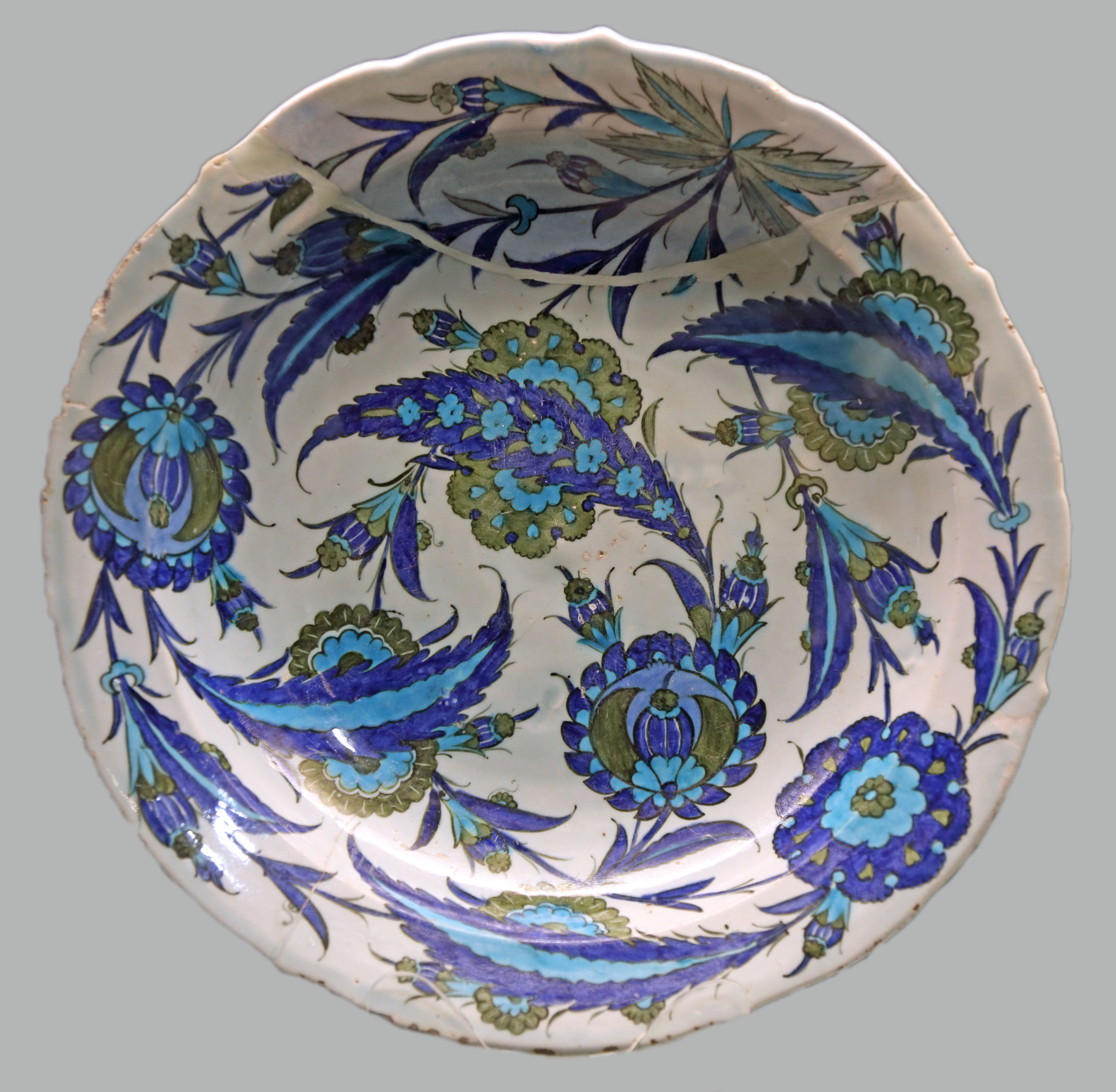
Iznik dish with an all-over design of composite lotus blossoms and rosettes overlapped in curved serrated leaves, c. 1545–1550. British Museum

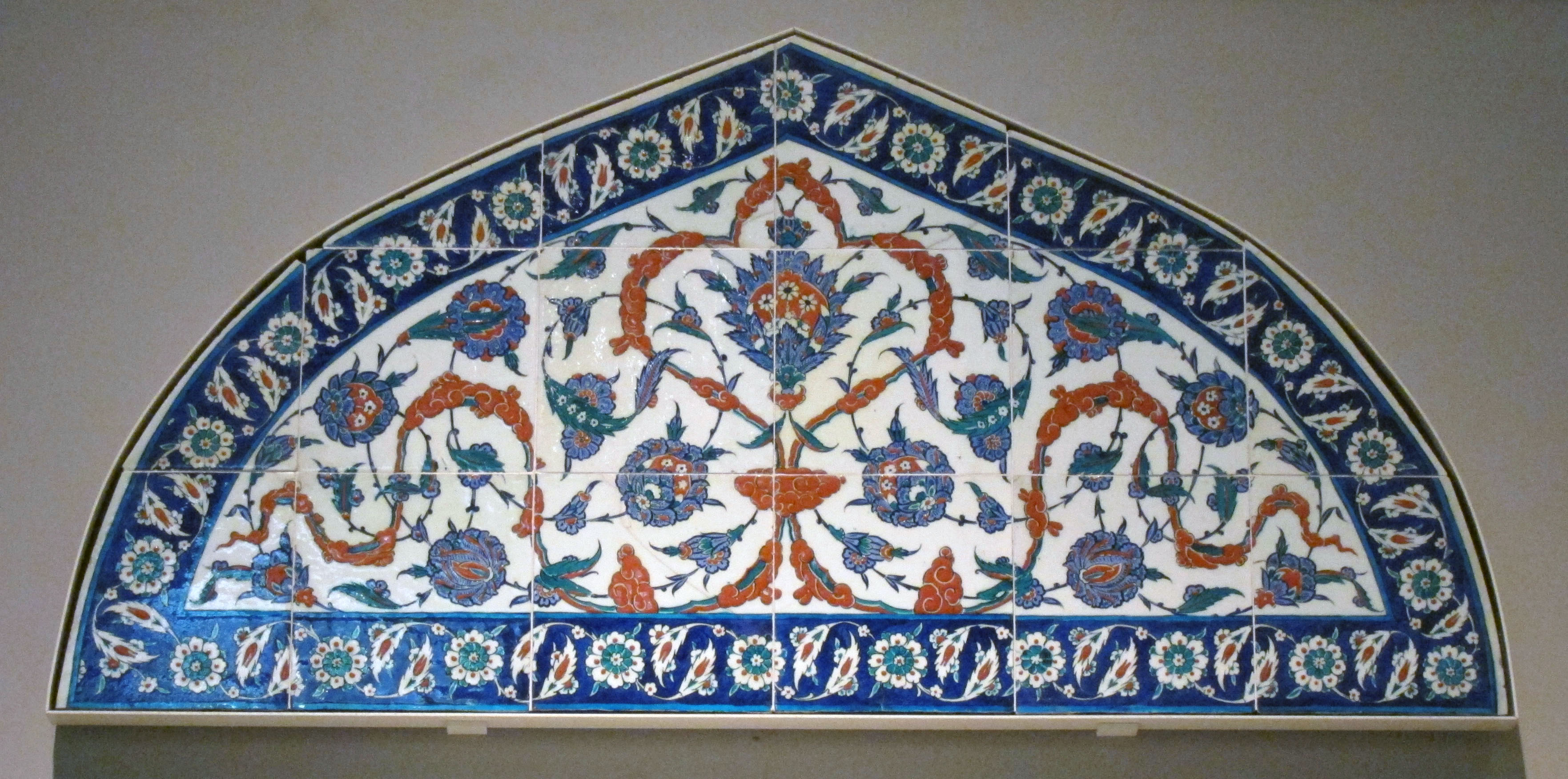
Iznik tiled lunette panel from the Piyale Pasha Mosque, c. 1570–1575. Victoria and Albert Museum

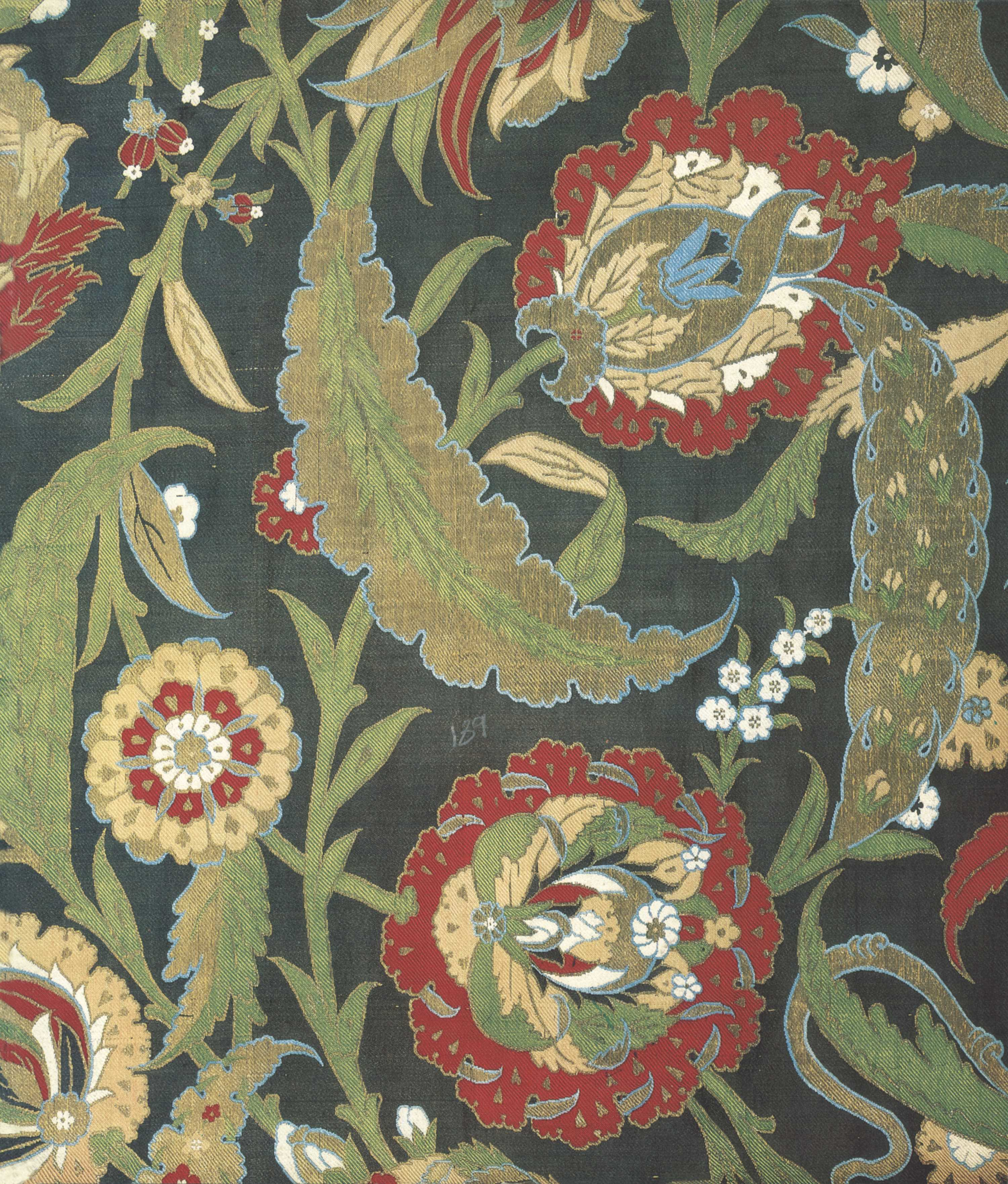
Detail from a kemha ceremonial kaftan with saz pattern made for Şehzade Bayezid, mid-sixteenth century. Topkapı Palace Museum

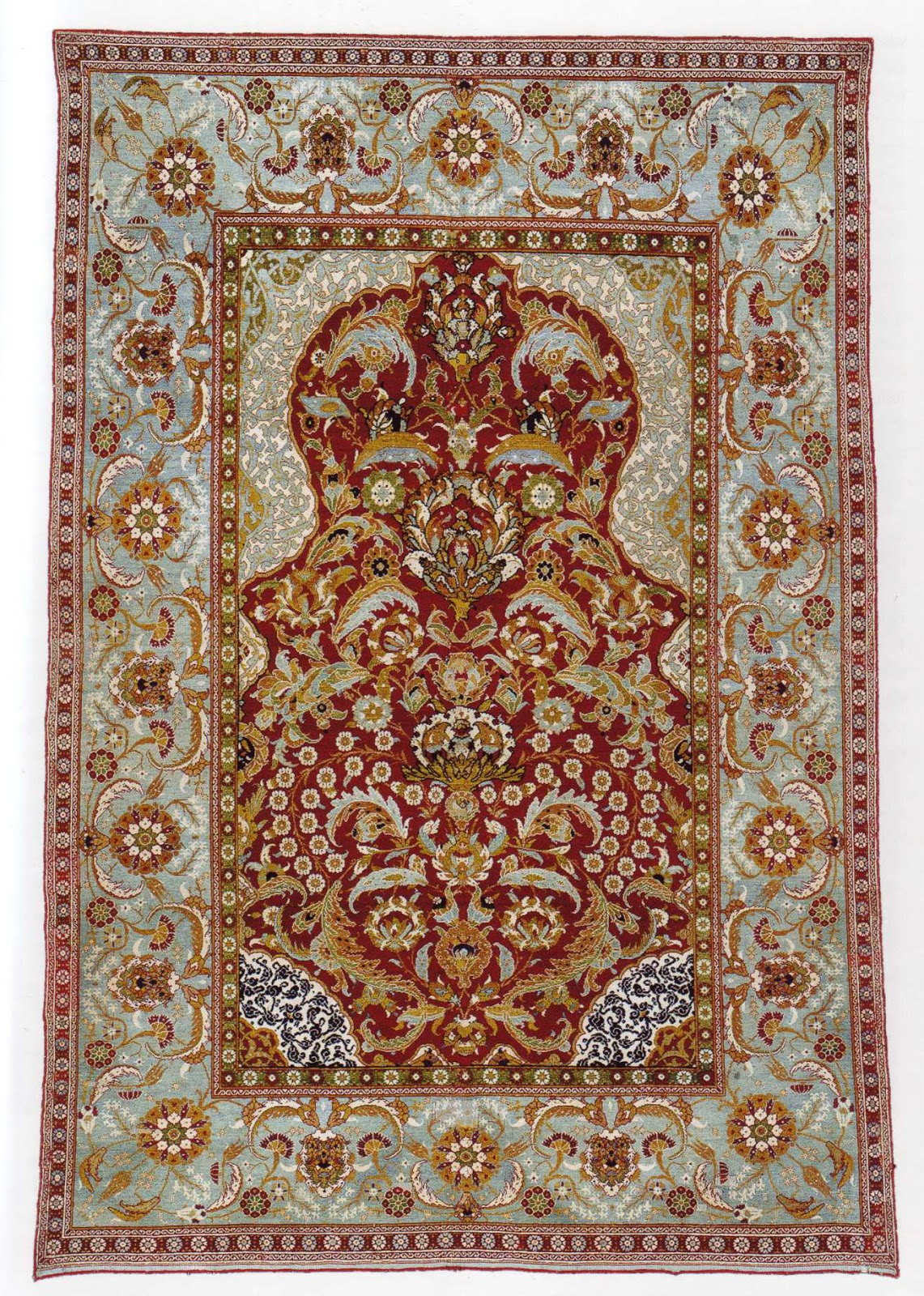
Niche or prayer carpet, from the 2nd half of the 16th century. Museum of Applied Arts, Vienna

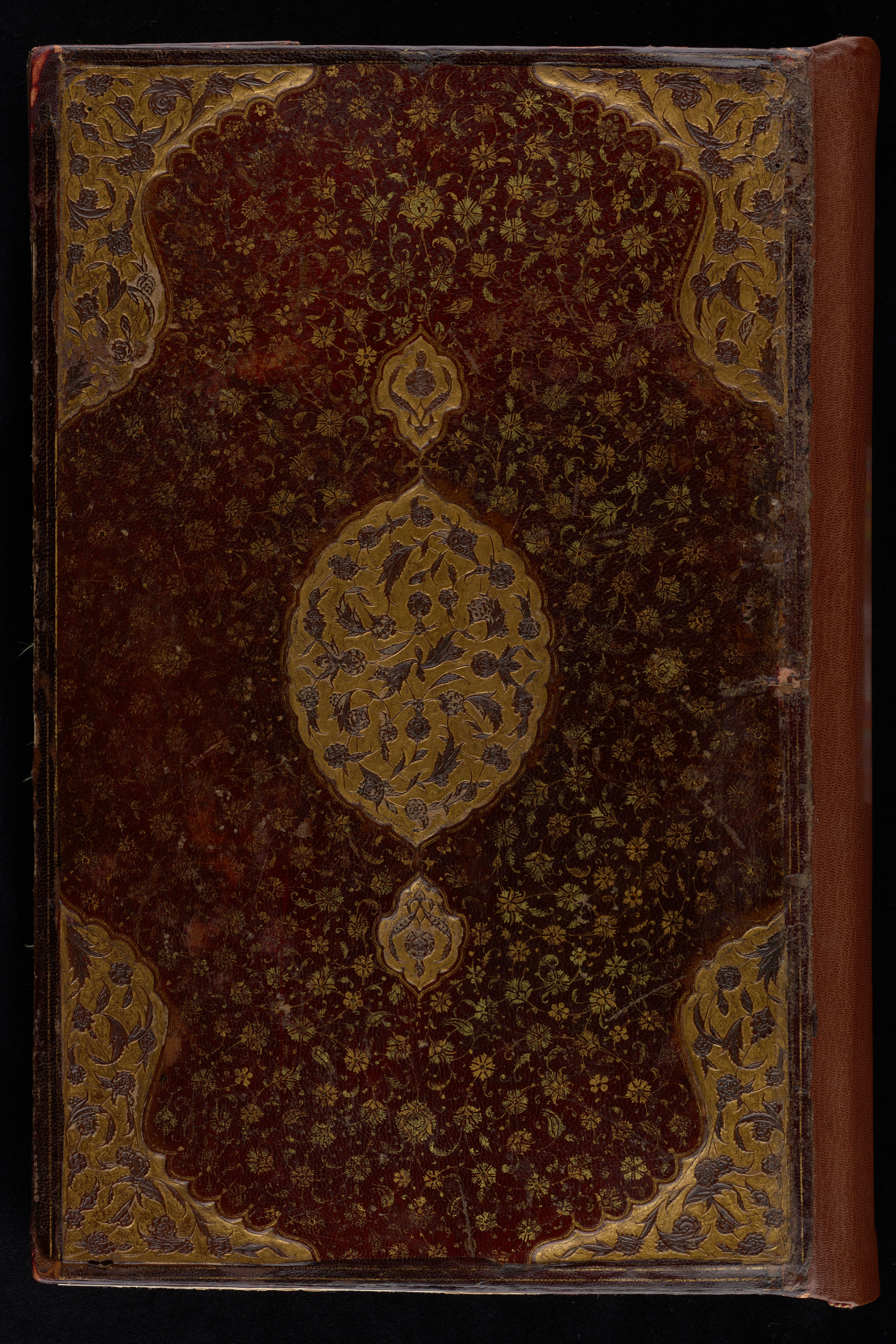
Binding from "The Cream of Histories" (Zubdat al-tawarikh), c. 1585–1590. Chester Beatty Library

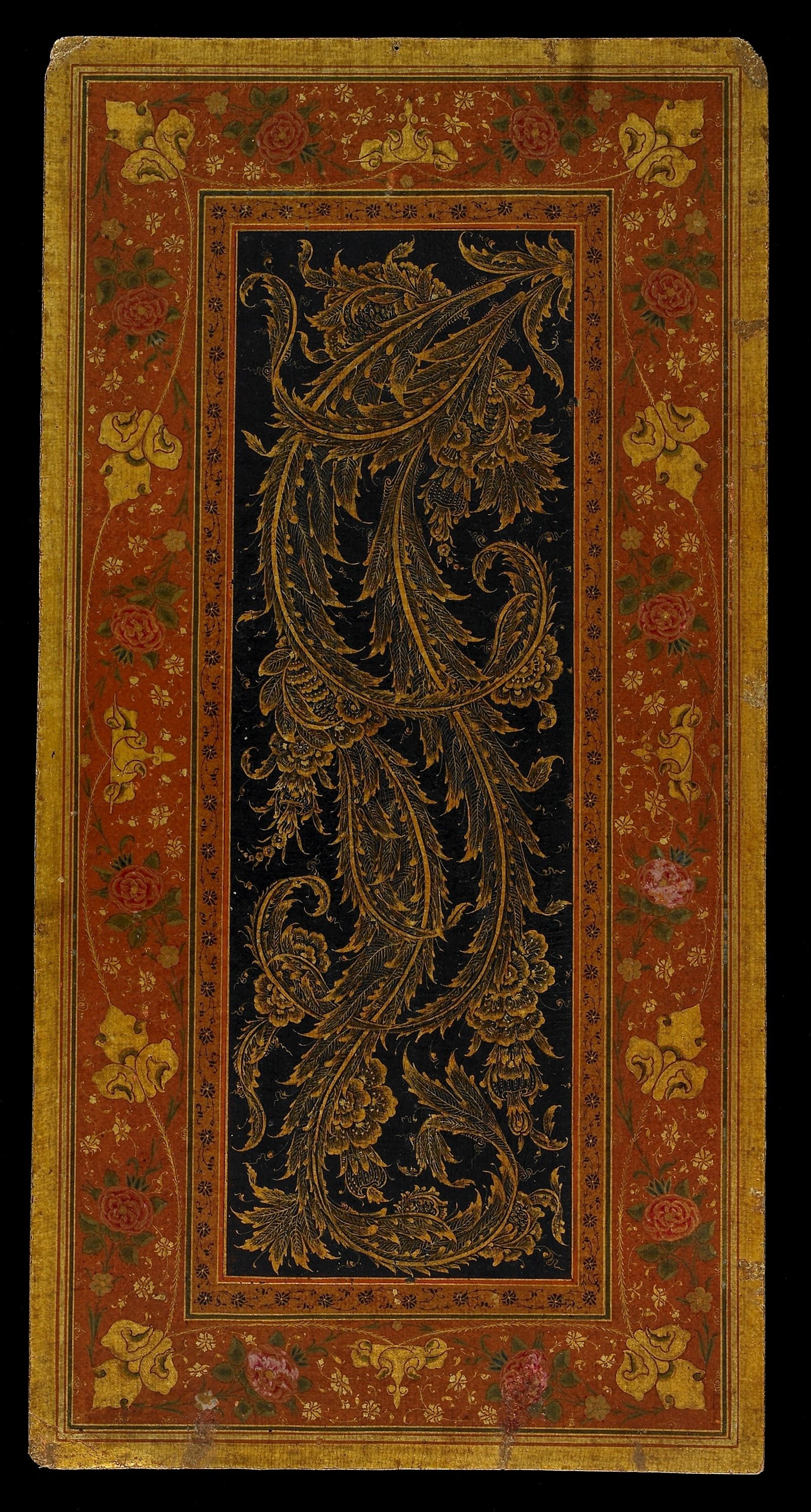
Book cover by Ali Üsküdarî, 1747–1748. Arthur M. Sackler Gallery
