= Şahkulu (painter) =

16th-century painter credited as having developed the sāz style

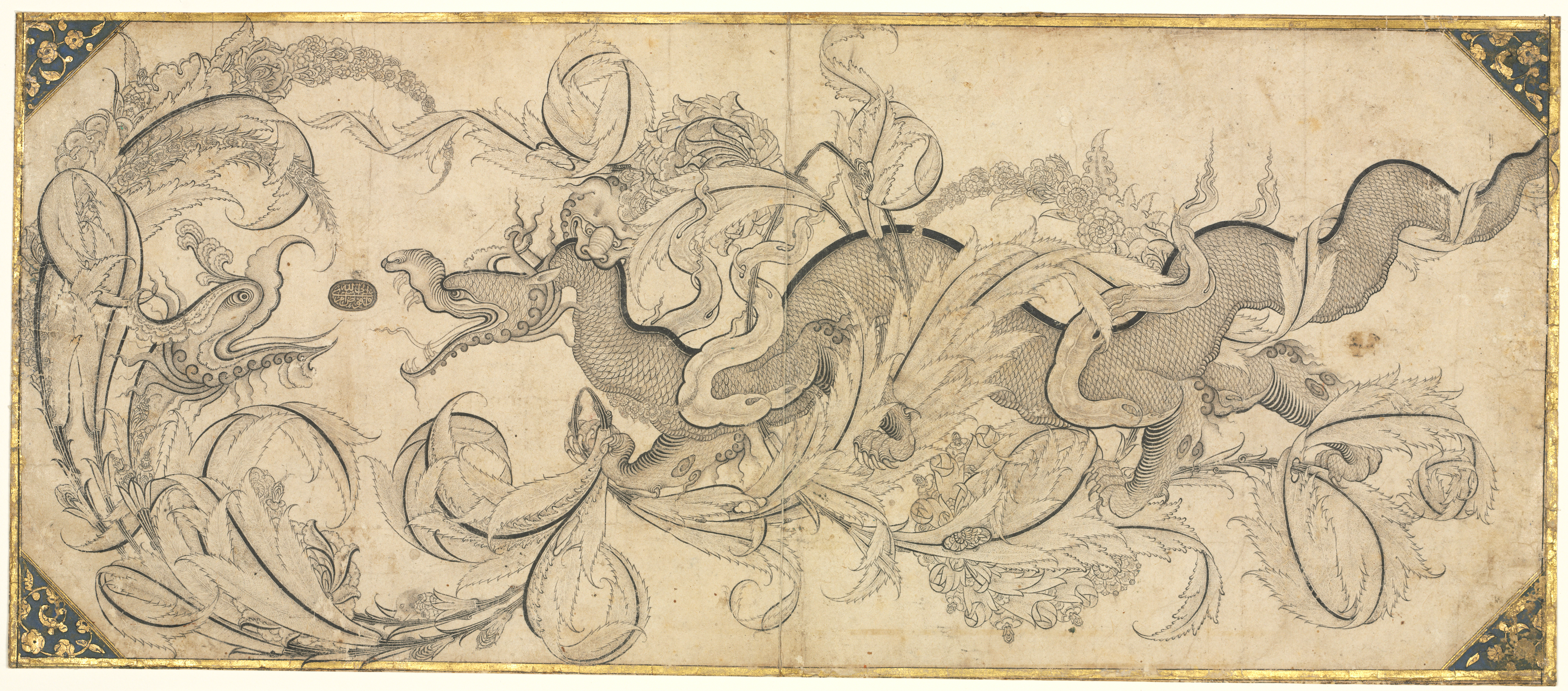
This drawing of dragon entangled in swirling foliage under attack from a lion above while assaulting a phoenix is "certainly the greatest masterpiece of the [saz] style". It belongs to the first phase of the style and is attributed to Şahkulu. Cleveland Museum of Art

Şahkulu (Ottoman Turkish: شاه قولی; Persian: شاهقلی بغدادی Shāhqulī-i Baghdādī; died 1556) was an Ottoman painter who played a leading role in a formation of the saz style.

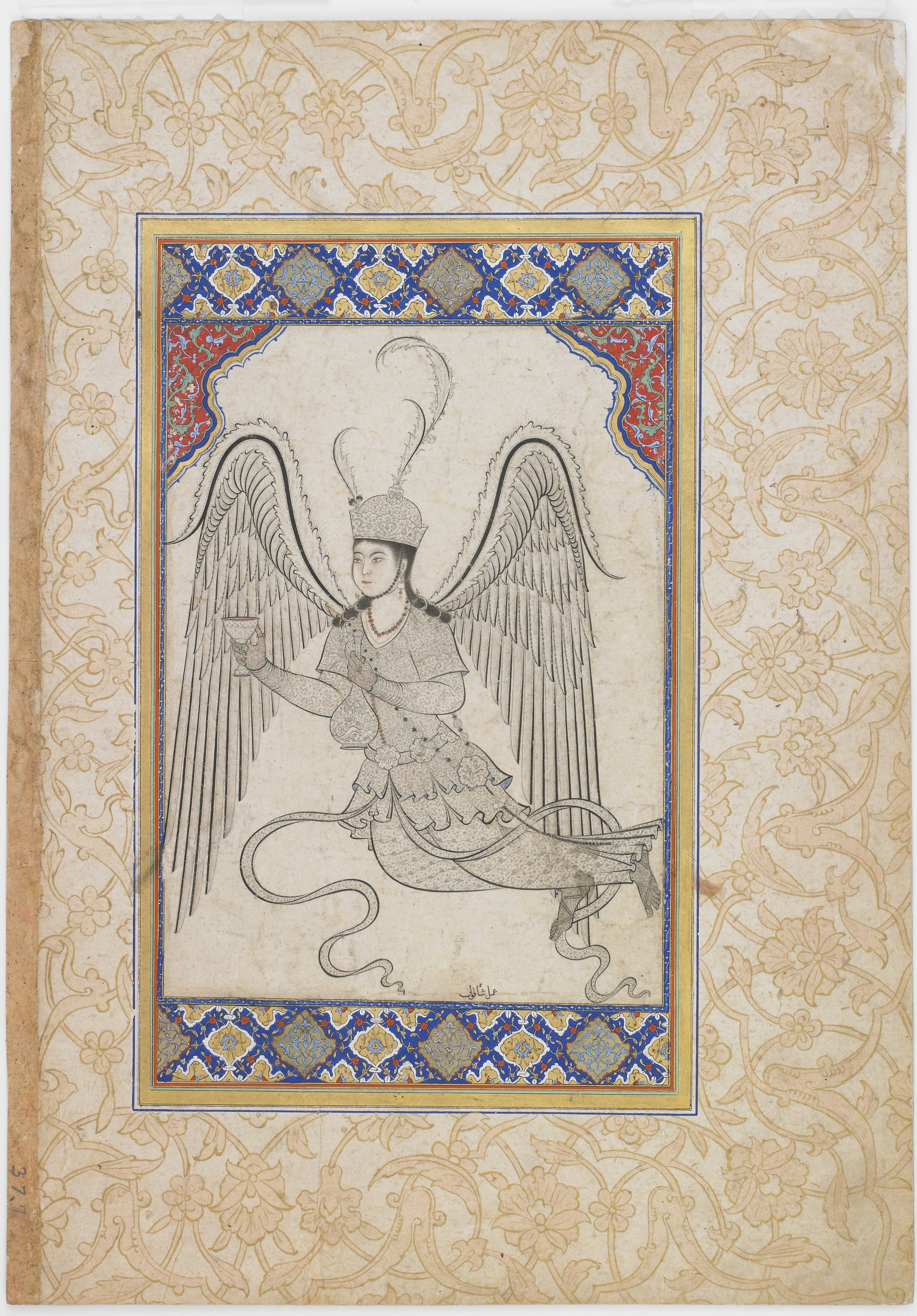
Angel (peri), flying, with cup and wine flask (signed). Freer Gallery of Art

Saz style "in which mythical creatures derived from Chinese or Islamic sources move through an enchanted forest made up of oversized composite blossoms and feathery leaves, has parallels in the art of the Aqqoyunlu and Safavid courts at Tabriz, where Shahquli trained under a master named Aqa Mirak" (it was not the well-known painter of Tahmasp's court). According to Sam Mirza Safavi (who does not mention his emigration to Ottoman lands) Şahkulu came from Qom. His name is in a document found in Ottoman Archives among the scholars and artisans who were exiled from Tabriz to Istanbul via Amasya on 12 April 1515, the aftermath of Ottoman occupation of Tabriz after the battle of Chaldiran. The 1525-26 register of court artisans list him as the head draftsman (ressam) of the twenty-nine artists and twelve apprentices employed there, with high daily salary of twenty two akçe. He became popular with Suleiman, to whom he gave a picture of a peri, and received gifts including 2000 akçe and broaded caftans and velvets. Another register from the same year adds the note that he joined the Istanbul naqqash khana ("painter's house") in 1520–21.

He next appears in 1545-46 as head (sar buluk) of the Anatolian ("Rumi") section of the naqqash khana (it was one of the two sections). According to Mustafa Ali, writing in 1586, Şahkulu was given an independent studio where the sultan liked to watch him work, together with a position of chief painter (naqqash bashi) and salary of one hundred akçe (this last figure is probably an exaggeration, because the salary would have been without precedent). A note in a list of gifts made by the sultan to his court artists in 1555–6 states that Şahkulu had died before the gift could be presented to him. His most important pupil was Kara Memi.

The role of Şahkulu in formation of saz style "is of great importance, even though it is difficult to attribute firmly to his hand more than a small number of works". Şahkulu signature is found on two ink drawings: one (damaged; Topkapı Pal. Lib., H. 2154, fol. 2r) represents a dragon and was incorporated into an album, the preface of which was written in 1544–5; the other (Freer, 37.7) depicts a flying peri (angel) with a cup and wine flask. A third drawing which bears his name (Met., 57.51.26), also representing a dragon, appears to be a later copy. His "refined brushwork and strong sense of design and dramatic movement are also seen in several unsigned drawings of dragons and peris and studies of blossoms and leaves". The importance given in later times to his name in the history of Ottoman art resulted in its "being attached to a great number of works of diverse styles and periods, not unlike the numerous 'signatures' of Riza and Bihzad".

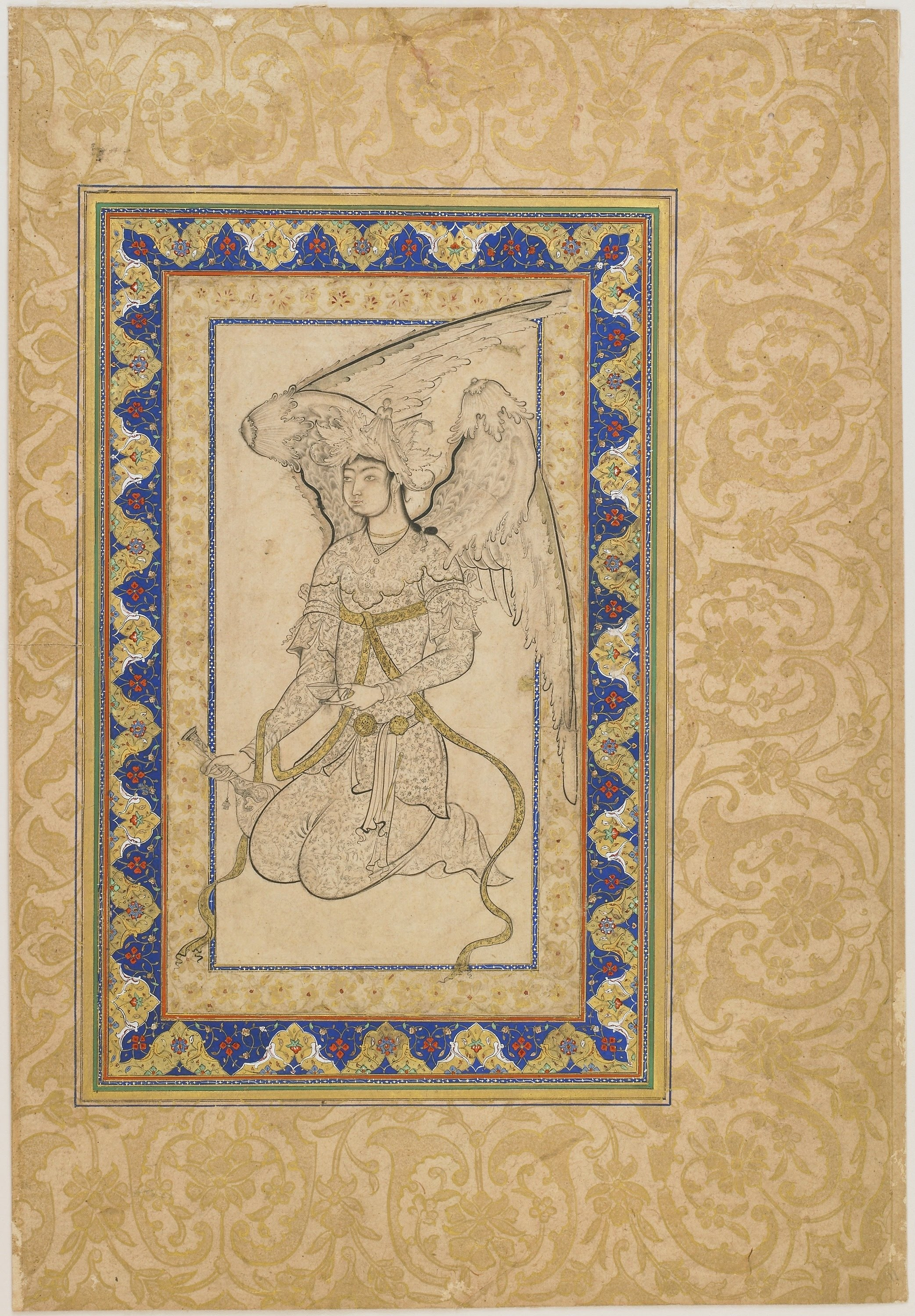
Kneeling Angel (peri) with Cup and Bottle (attribution). Freer Gallery of Art

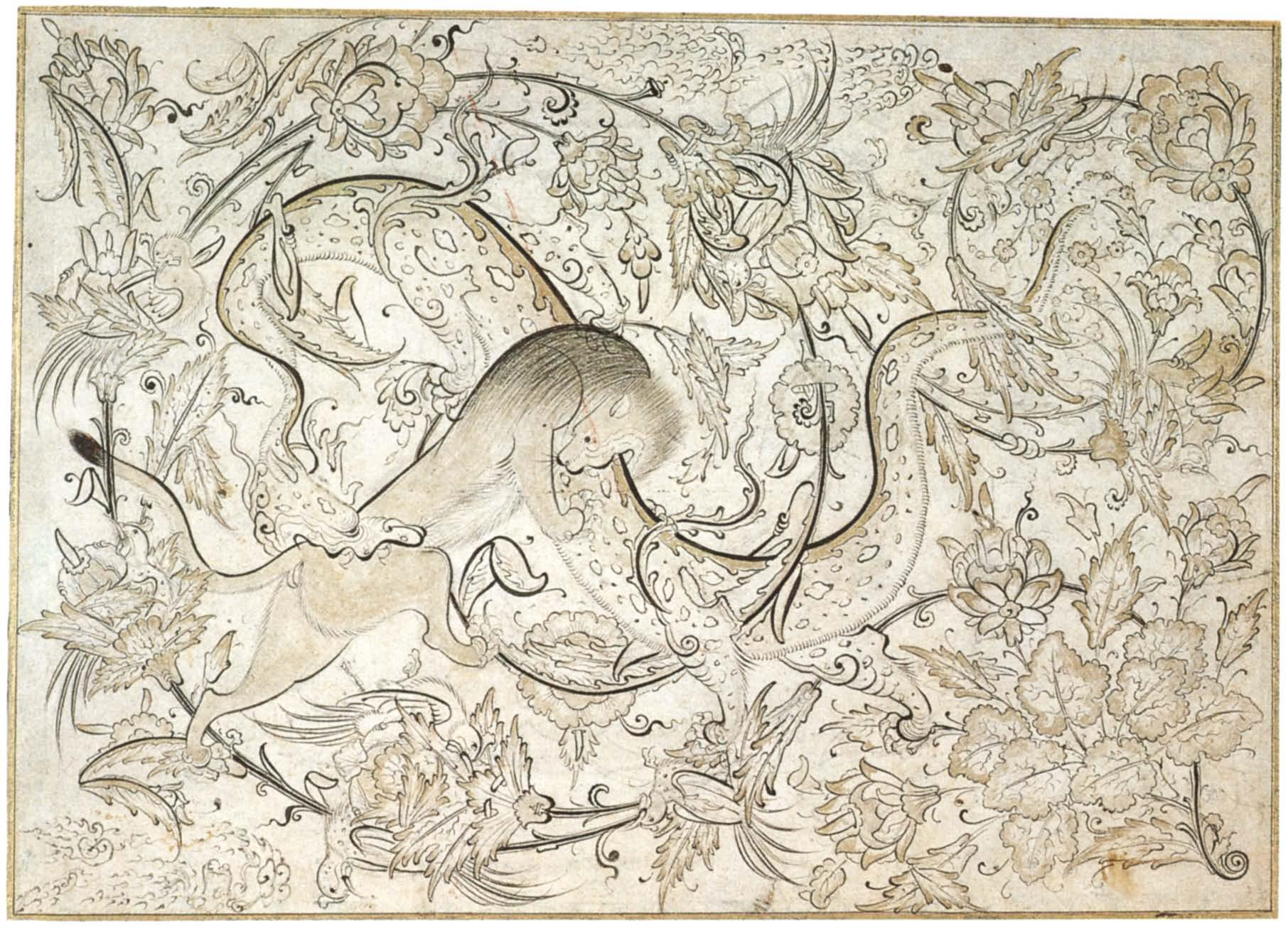
Combat between dragon and lion (attribution) Topkapı Palace Library

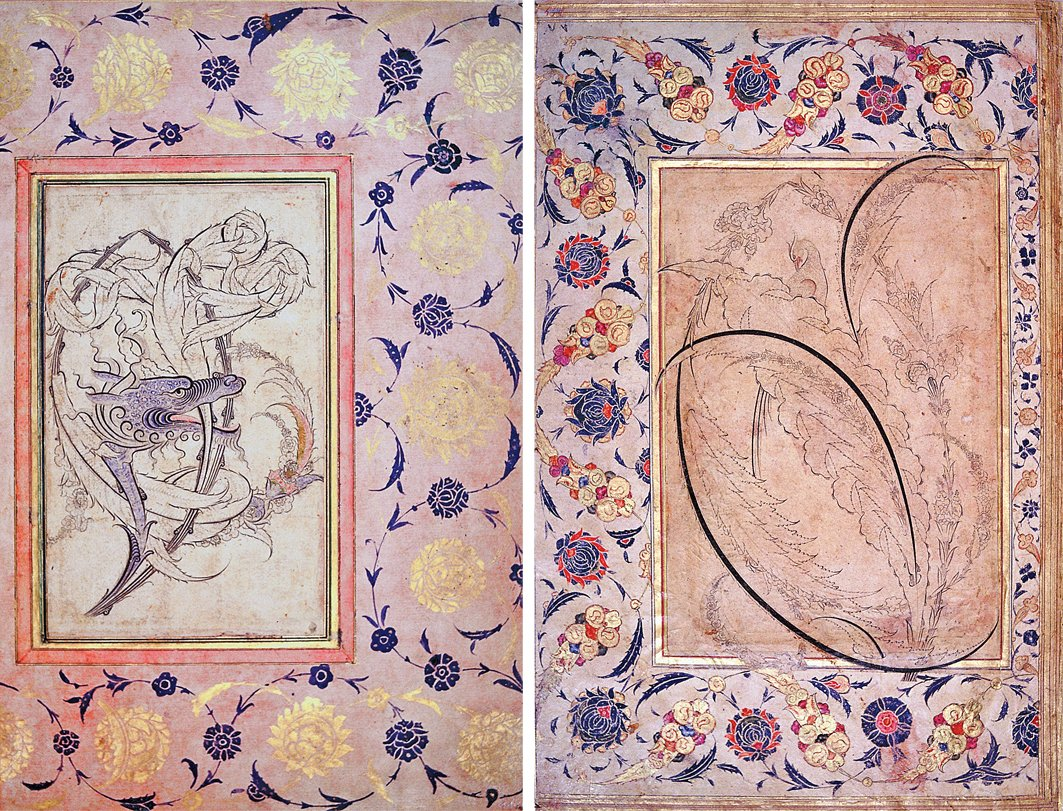
Two pages from the Sultan Murad III Album (Muraqqa) (attribution). Austrian National Library

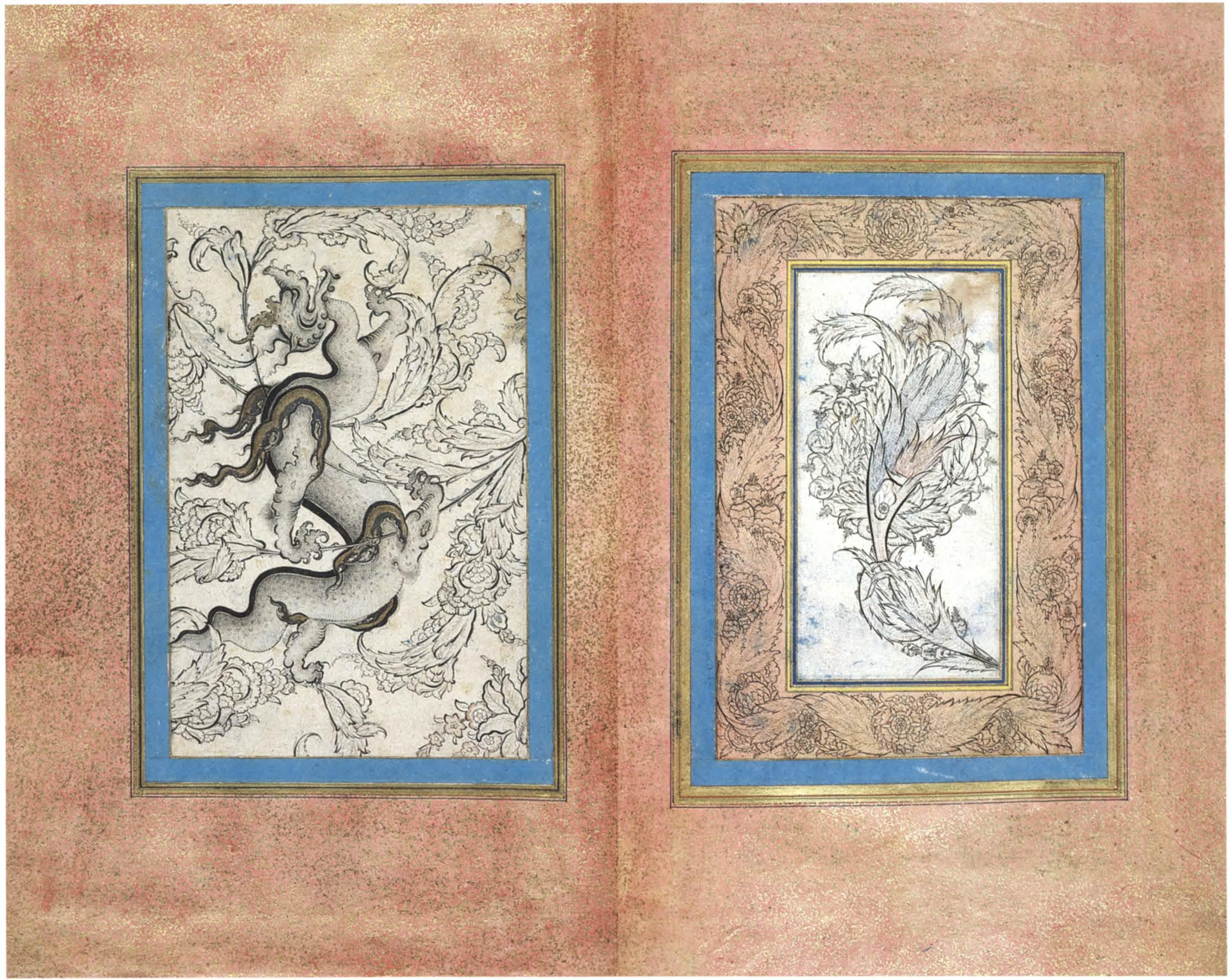
Dragon (left) and hatayi blossoms (right). It is highly possible that these two drawings were executed by Şahkulu. Istanbul University Library

== Bibliography ==
- Akin-Kivanç, Esra (2011). Mustafa Âli's Epic Deeds of Artists. Brill. ISBN 978-90-47-44107-6.
- Esin Atıl (2003). "Shahquli". Grove Art Online. doi:10.1093/gao/9781884446054.article.T077973.
- Blair, Sheila S.; Bloom, Jonathan M. (1995). The Art and Architecture of Islam 1250-1800. Yale University Press. ISBN 9780300064650.
- Denny, Walter B. (1983). "Dating Ottoman Turkish Works in the Saz Style". Muqarnas. 1: 103–121. doi:10.2307/1523074. JSTOR 1523074.
- Fatma Çĭĉek Derman, Gülnur Duran. "ŞAHKULU". İslâm Ansiklopedisi (in Turkish).
