= Siyâvush Beg Gorji =

Iranian illustrator

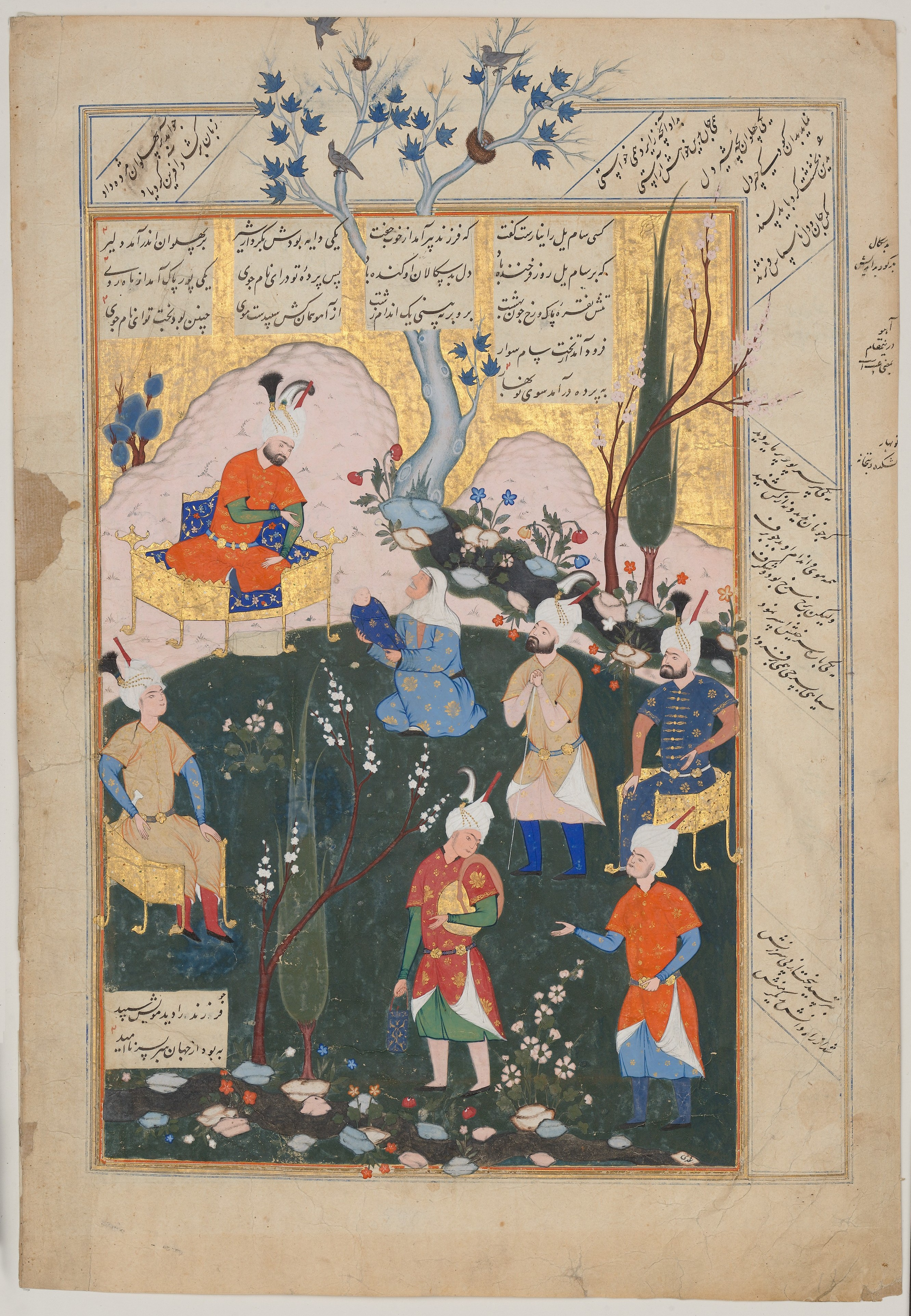
"The Birth of Zal", illustrated leaf from a manuscript of the Shahnameh produced for Safavid Shah Ismail II. Created by Siyâvush in Qazvin, dated 1576–77

Siyâvash, Siyavush, or Siyavush Beg (c. 1536 — pre-1616) was an Iranian illustrator of Georgian origin known for his miniatures with dramatic landscape elements and well-organized compositions. He was active at the court of the Safavid shahs of Iran.

According to the Persian chronicler Qazi Ahmad, Siyâvash was a Georgian slave brought to Tabriz as a child and assigned to the royal studio where he studied under Muzaffar 'Ali, artist and close companion to the Safavid shah Tahmasp I. Among his students was Veli Can.
