= Ernst Schütz =

Austrian singer and actor (1935–2020)

- Born: 5 October 1935
- Died: 22 December 2020 (aged 85); Mondsee, Austria
- Occupations: Singer; Actor

Ernst Schütz (5 October 1935 – 22 December 2020) was an Austrian singer and actor.

== Biography ==
Schütz studied singing at the Johann-Joseph-Fux-Konservatorium Graz. He made his debut from 1962 to 1964 at the Graz Opera. In 1966, he moved to Vienna and sang operettas at the Raimund Theater until 1972. He was also an actor, notably in the film Außer Rand und Band am Wolfgangsee in 1972.

Schütz died on 22 December 2020 in Mondsee at the age of 85.

== Filmography ==
- The Merry Wives of Windsor (1965)
- Boccaccio (1966)
- Der Vogelhändler (1967)
- Der Vetter aus Dingsda (1970)
- Außer Rand und Band am Wolfgangsee (1972)
- Boccaccio (1972)
