= Herzog Blaubarts Burg =

- Ana Raquel Satre and Norman Foster
- Also known as: Bluebeard's Castle
- Based on: Bluebeard's Castle by Béla Balázs
- Directed by: Michael Powell
- Starring: Norman Foster; Ana Raquel Satre
- Music by: Béla Bartók
- Country of origin: West Germany
- Original language: German

Production
- Producer: Norman Foster
- Cinematography: Hannes Staudinger
- Editor: Paula Dvorak
- Running time: 60 minutes

Original release
- Network: Süddeutscher Rundfunk
- Release: 15 December 1963

Herzog Blaubarts Burg ("Duke Bluebeard's Castle") (1963) is a film of the opera Bluebeard's Castle by the Hungarian composer Béla Bartók, written in 1911 to a symbolist libretto by the poet and later film theorist Béla Balázs. The film was made for West German television, Süddeutscher Rundfunk, and was produced by Norman Foster, who also performs the lead role. The designer was Hein Heckroth who brought in his old friend Michael Powell, for whom he had designed a number of films, to direct it. The film, which was shot at Dürer Film Ateliers in Salzburg, Austria, was out of circulation for decades because of legal problems.

Balázs' retelling is a modified version of the story of Bluebeard, the wife-killer of legend. In the opera, Bluebeard reluctantly and gradually uncovers the secrets of his psyche to his fourth wife, opening the seven doors in his castle to ultimately reveal the still living previous wives, among whom the horrified Judit must take her place. The only performers are Norman Foster as Bluebeard and Ana Raquel Satre as Judit, his fourth wife, accompanied by the Zagreb Symphony Orchestra conducted by Milan Horvat. It is sung in German although prints exist with English subtitles. A recent print was made which included Powell's notes on the production, displayed as subtitles.

Bartók's opera, which did not receive its first mounting until 1918, was widely regarded as "unperformable" due to its lack of stage action. Powell and Heckroth turn this quality to their advantage by creating an intense, expressionist psychodrama, where lighting and abstract décor convey the gradual revelation of Bluebeard's inner torment to his last wife. The vivid colours and semi-abstract, neo-primitive décor designed by Heckroth and his team give the film a suitably oppressive feel.
