= Paula Dvorak =

Austrian film editor

- Born: 8 August 1913; Wien, Austria
- Died: 24 September 1995 (aged 82); Wien, Austria
- Occupation: Film editor

Paula Dvorak (sometimes credited as Paula Dworak) was an Austrian film editor active from the 1930s through the 1970s.

== Career ==
Dvorak began training in editing with Sascha-Film in 1932. She and Annemarie Reisetbauer were among the only women editors active in the postwar Austrian film industry; they often worked together on projects.

== Selected filmography ==
- Marika (1950)
- Vanished Melody (1952)
- A Night in Venice (1953)
- The Last Bridge (1954)
- Three Men in the Snow (1955)
- Rosmarie kommt aus Wildwest (1956)
- Mikosch of the Secret Service (1959)
- Die unvollkommene Ehe (1959)
- Everyman (1961)
- The Red Frenzy (1962)
- The Black Cobra (1963)
- Herzog Blaubarts Burg (1963, TV film)
- The Great Happiness (1967)
