= Norman Foster (bass) =

American opera singer (1924–2000)

- Born: January 8, 1924; Boston, Massachusetts, United States
- Died: March 8, 2000 (aged 76); Hamburg, Germany
- Occupations: Singer, Actor, Writer
- Spouse: Sibylle Nabel-Foster

Norman Foster (born Boston, Massachusetts) was an American operatic bass-baritone, a film and television actor and a television producer.

== Recordings ==
- Gustav Mahler: Lieder eines fahrenden Gesellen with Bamberg Symphony Orchestra conducted by Jascha Horenstein recorded 1954 (Vox Box, 47163552922, released 1999)
- Samuel Barber: Vanessa (Norman Foster, Eleanor Steber, Nicolai Gedda, Alois Pernerstorfer, Rosalind Elias, Ira Malaniuk, Giorgio Tozzi) Vienna State Opera Chorus, Vienna Philharmonic Orchestra; Conductor: Dimitri Mitropoulos. Orfeo ORF 653062.
- Gian Carlo Menotti: The Medium Performer: Norman Foster (Baritone), Hilde Konetzni (Soprano), Sonja Draksler (Mezzo Soprano), María José De Vine (Soprano), Elisabeth Höngen (Mezzo Soprano), Nino Albanese (Voice); Vienna Volksoper Orchestra, Armando Aliberti (conductor). Recorded 1964. Label: Arthaus Musik (DVD) 101515, released 2010

== Films ==
- Herzog Blaubarts Burg (Bluebeard's Castle) (1964)
- Espionage: A Free Agent (1964)
- Die lustigen Weiber von Windsor (The Merry Wives of Windsor) (1966)
