= Muqarnas (journal) =

- Discipline: Islamic visual culture
- Language: English
- Edited by: Gülru Necipoğlu

Publication details
- History: 1983-present
- Publisher: Brill Publishers
- Frequency: Annually

Standard abbreviations
- ISO 4: Muqarnas

Indexing
- ISSN: 0732-2992
- LCCN: 2005-237311
- JSTOR: 07322992
- OCLC no.: 55529825

Links
- Journal homepage

Muqarnas is an annual academic journal of the Aga Khan Program for Islamic Architecture at Harvard University and the Massachusetts Institute of Technology. The journal was established in 1983 and focuses on Islamic architecture and visual arts, and has become established as "perhaps the leading journal" in English in the field. Oleg Grabar was among the founders.

The journal's name, muqarnas, is a decorative device in traditional Islamic and Persian architecture.
