= Parī =

Fairy-like spirit in West and Central Asian folklore of Persian origin

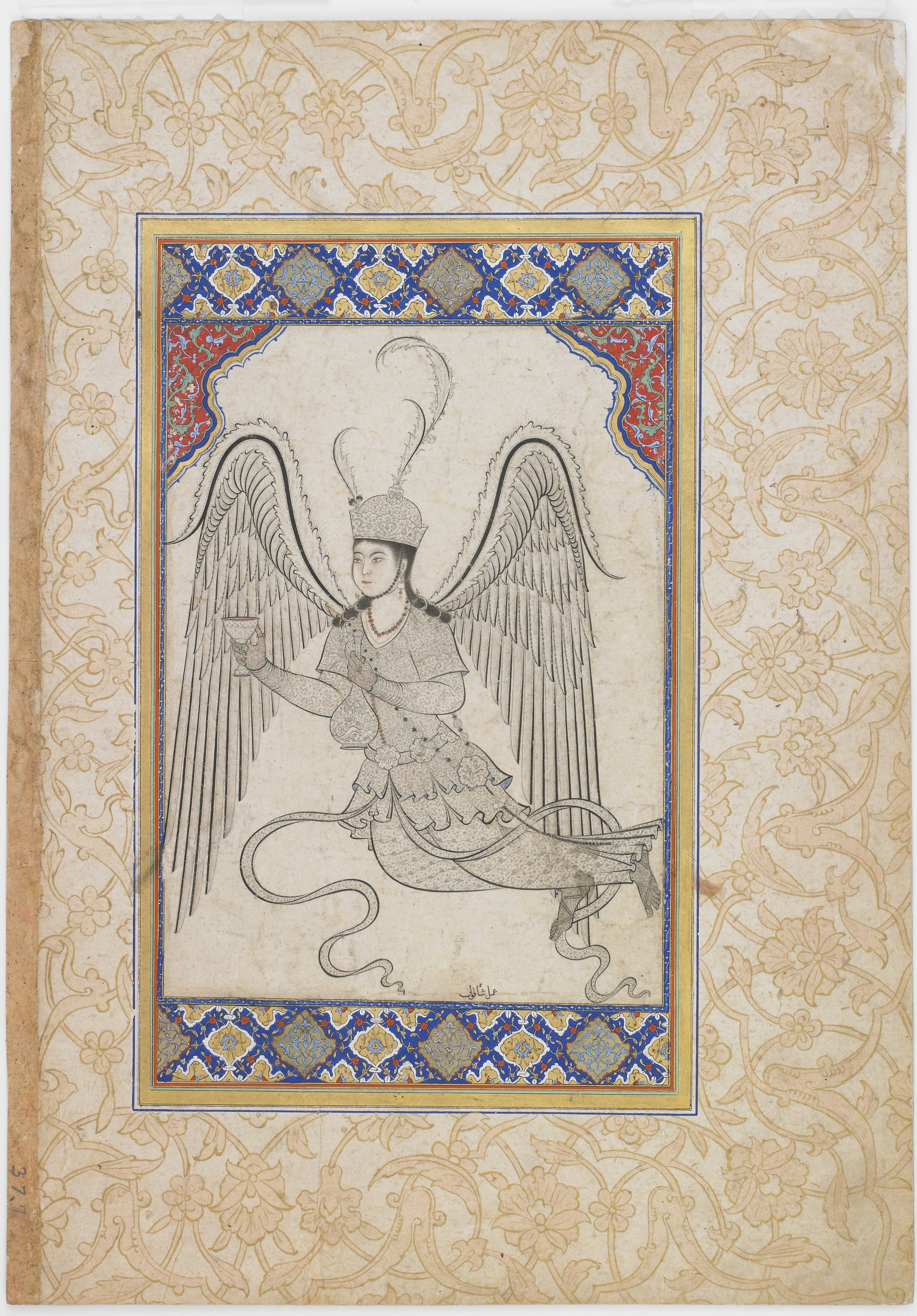
- Parī, flying, with cup and wine flask in a miniature by Şahkulu

Creature information
- Grouping: Mythical creature
- Folklore: Pre-Islamic Persian folklore, Islamic folklore

A parī or peri (Persian: پری) is a supernatural entity originating from Persian tales and distributed into wider Asian folklore. The parīs are often described as winged creatures of immense beauty who are structured in societies similar to that of humans. In contrast to jinn, the parīs usually feature in tales involving supernatural elements.

Over time, the depiction of parīs was subject to change and reconsideration. In early Persian beliefs, the parīs were probably a class of evil spirits and only later received a positive reception. In the Islamic period, the parī already developed into morally complex beings with a generally positive connotation of immense beauty, and late in the tenth century, were integrated into the Arab houri-tale tradition. They are often contrasted by their nemeses, the ugly dīvs.

Despite their beauty, the parīs are also feared because they are said to abduct people and take them to their home-world, Parīstān, or punish people for social transgressions.

== Etymology ==
The Persian word پَری parī comes from Middle Persian parīg, itself from Old Persian *parikā-. The word may stem from the same root as the Persian word par 'wing', although other proposed etymologies exist.

The etymological relation to the English word "fairy" is disputed. Some argue that there is no relation and that both words derive from different meanings. Others argue that both terms share a common origin: the English term "fairy" deriving from fier (enchant) and the Persian term from par (enchant). However, there is no consensus on either theory.

== Persian literature ==
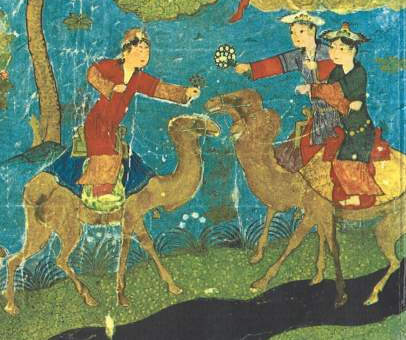
Houris in paradise, riding camels. From a 15th-century Persian manuscript.

Originally, the parīs have been considered a class of dēvatā and the term dīvānah refers to a person who lost reason because they fell in love, as the beloved steals the lover's reason. In this regard, the parī features similar to the Arabic jinn. The jinn, unlike the parīs, do not have connotations of beauty however. In Middle Persian literature, comets have been identified with parī. Comets and planets were associated with evil, while the Sun, the Moon, and the fixed stars with goodness. Such negative associations of the planets, however, are not supported in Avestan languages.

In popular literature of the Islamic period, parīs are non-human beings with wings and magical powers. They are often, though not necessarily, female and employ an erotic appeal to mortal men. As early as the tenth century, parī feature as a template for the exquisite beauty of "the beloved" in Persianate folklore and poetry, echoing an identification with the Arabic Houri. However, the term has also been used as a synonym for jinn.

At the start of Ferdowsi's epic poem Shahnameh, "The Book of Kings", the divinity Sorush appears in the form of a parī to warn Keyumars (the mythological first man and shah of the world) and his son Siamak of the threats posed by the destructive Ahriman. Parīs also form part of the mythological army that Keyumars eventually draws up to defeat Ahriman and his demonic son.

In the stories of One Thousand and One Nights, a parī appears only in the story of Ahmad and Pari Bānu. The tale is a combination of originally two separate stories; the parī features in the latter, when Prince Ahmad meets the beautiful princess Pari Banu. Ahmad has to deal with difficult tasks he manages to comply by aid of his fairy-wife.

== Folklore ==
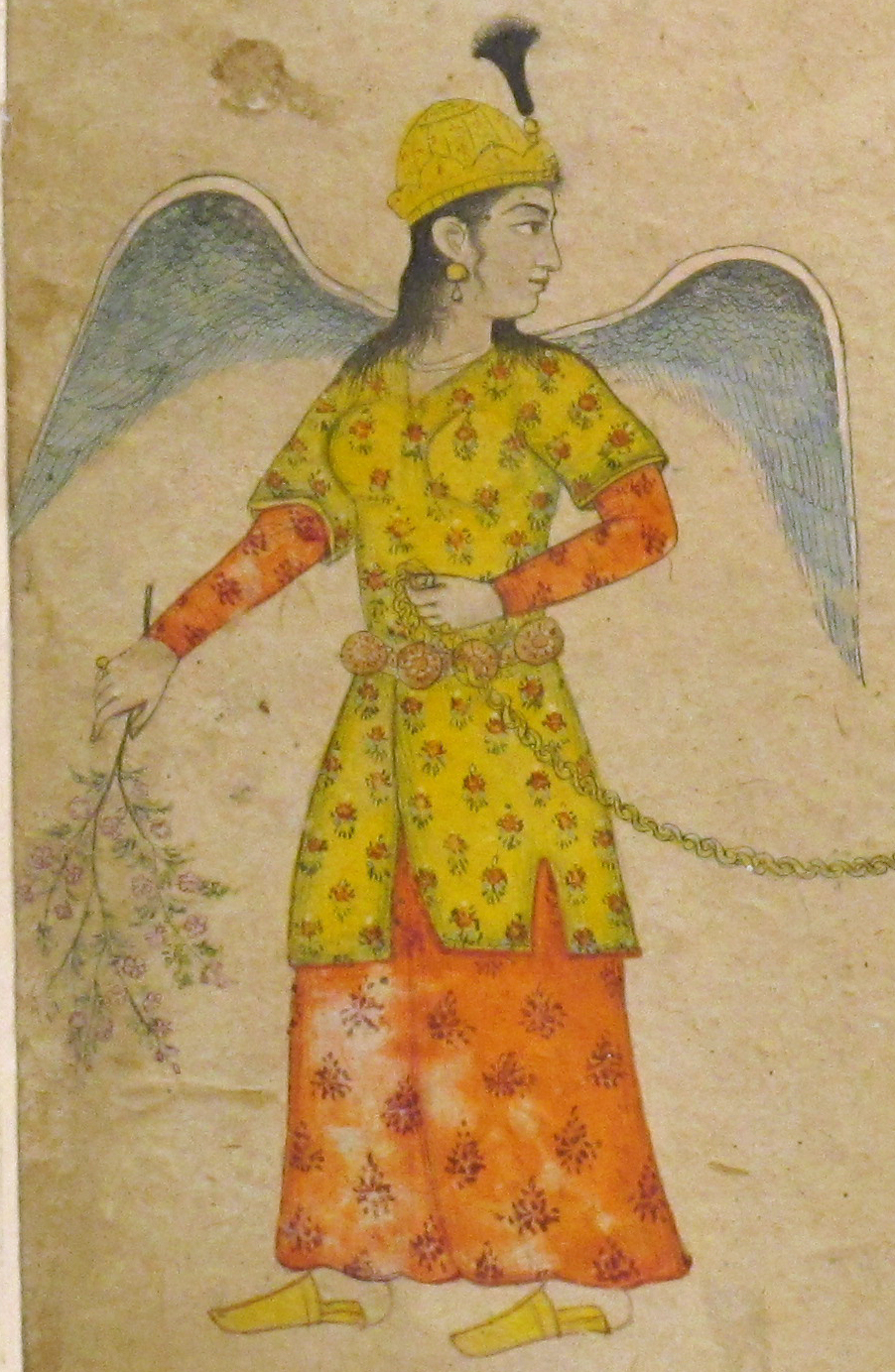
Depiction of a Parī, 19th century, Rajput Bhopal museum

From India, across Northern Pakistan, Afghanistan, and Iran to Central Asia, and Turkey, local traditions variously acknowledge the existence of a supernatural creature called parī. The term parī is attested in Turkish sources from the 11th century onward and was probably associated with the Arabic jinn when entering Turk beliefs through Islamic sources. Although jinn and parīs are sometimes used as synonyms, the term parī is more frequently used in supernatural tales. According to the book People of the Air, the parīs are morally ambivalent creatures, and can be either Muslims or infidels.

According to Turkologist Ignác Kúnos, the parī in Turkish tales fly through the air with cloud-like garments of a green colour, but also in the shape of doves. They also number forty, seven or three, and serve a Fairy-king that can be a human person they abducted from the human world. Like vestals, Kúnos wrote, the parī belong to the spiritual realm until love sprouts in their hearts, and they must join with their mortal lovers, being abandoned by their sisters to their own devices. Also, the first meeting between humans and parī occurs during the latter's bathtime. The parīs are usually considered benevolent in Turkish sources. Shamans in Kazakhstan sometimes consult parī for aid in spiritual rituals. Uyghur shamans use the aid of parī to heal women from miscarriage, and protect from evil jinn. According to the Kho, parīs are able to cast love spells, sometimes used by a spiritual master referred to as "Master of Faries".

Sometimes the parīs would take interest in the life of humans and abduct them to invite them to weddings of fellow parī. Alleged abductions can be either physical or psychological, in which case their victims lose consciousness. During the periods of abductions, people claim to be able to see, hear, and interact with parī, and sometimes even report their words and appearance.

Parī were the target of a lower level of evil Dīvs (دیو), who persecuted them by locking them in iron cages. This persecution was brought about by, as the Dīvs perceived it, the parī' lack of sufficient self-esteem to join the rebellion against perversion.

== Islamic scripture and interpretations ==
Abu Ali Bal'ami's interpretation of the Qiṣaṣ al-anbiyāʾ, the History of the Prophets and Kings, God creates parī at some point after the vicious dīvs. They ruled the world until it was given to a tribe of angels called al-jinn (fereštegan), whose leader was Iblis. Although the parī are still present after the creation of Adam, and were present during the time of Keyumar, it is only after the flood that they became hidden from the sight of humankind.

Isma'ilite scholar Nasir Khusraw (1004 – between 1072 and 1088) elaborates on the concept of parī in his explanation of angels, jinn, and devils. He asserts that parī is the Persian term for jinn. Then, he proceeds that the parīs are divided into two categories: angel and devil. Each parī would be both a potential angel and a potential devil (dīv), depending on obedience or disobedience.

== Western representations ==
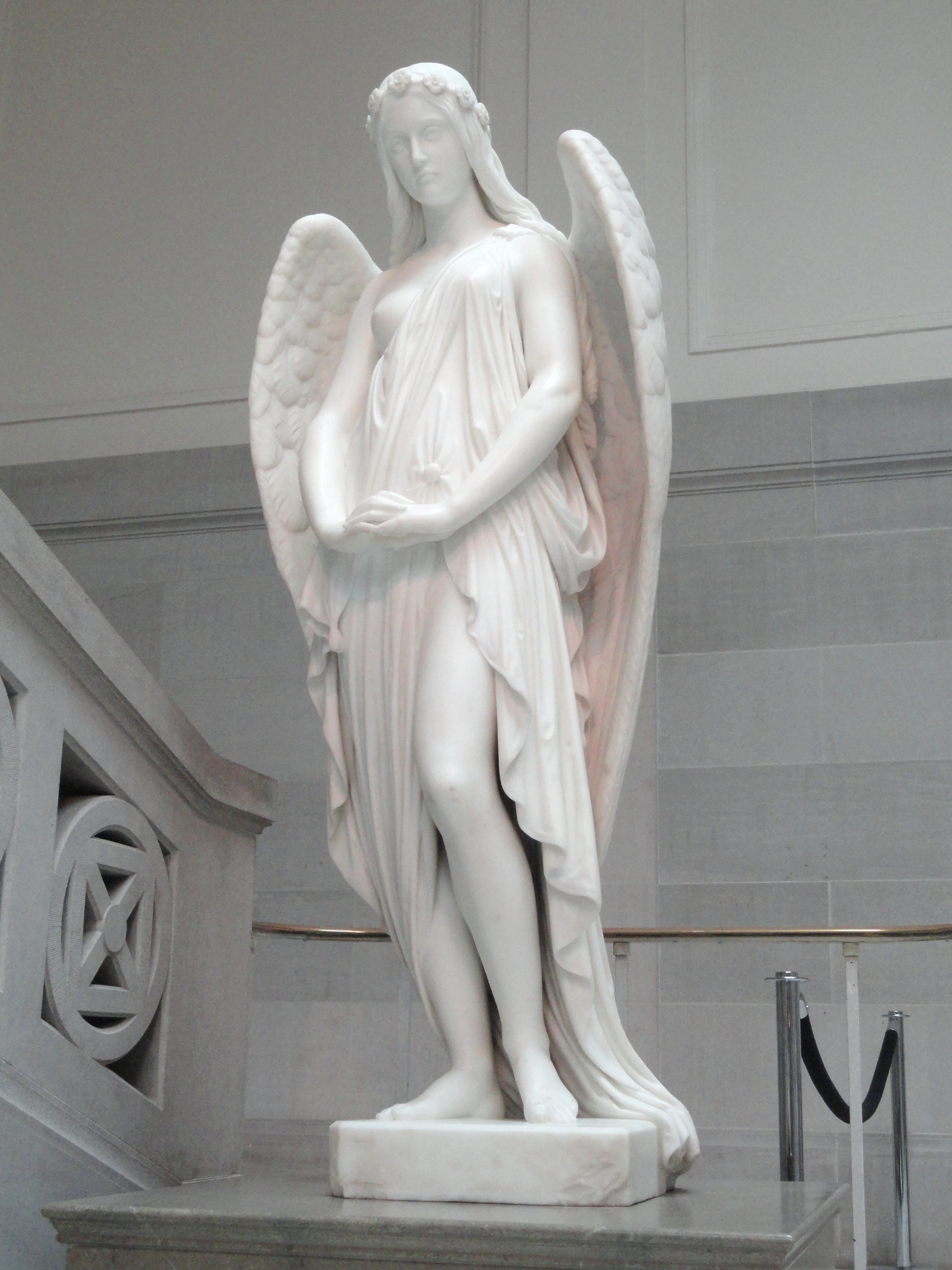
Peri at the Gates of Paradise, by Thomas Crawford (after Moore), Corcoran Gallery of Art

Arthur de Gobineau tells in his travel report about his 'three years in Asia' a story involving Fath-Ali Shah Qajar and parī. The Shah is said to have had a strong inclination towards the occult and had high respect for experts in the supernatural such as dervishes. One day, a dervish warned him that the prince needed precautions to meet the parī. The affection of parī might soon turn into wrath when he acted in a way that might offend it. He then prepares for a meeting at a pavilion outside the city. The garden was adorned with precious golden and silver vessels, jewelry, and costly furniture for the special occasion. After sunset, he fell asleep. When he woke up again, he found that not only was there no parī, but also that the dervish was gone. The author of the tale was probably familiarized with the tale on his travels to Tehran at orders of Napoleon III in 1855. The authors leave a mark of mockery and use it as a sign of the Persian's gullibility. Whether Gobineau's remark holds true or not, the story reflects the popularity of such belief in Iranian consciousness.

In Thomas Moore's poem "Paradise and the Peri," part of his Lalla Rookh, a peri gains entrance to heaven after three attempts at giving an angel the gift most dear to God. The first attempt is "The last libation Liberty draws/From the heart that bleeds and breaks in her cause," a drop of blood from a young soldier killed for an attempt on the life of Mahmud of Ghazni. Next is a "Precious sigh/of pure, self-sacrificing love": a sigh stolen from the dying lips of a maiden who died with her lover of bubonic plague in the Mountains of the Moon (Rwenzori Mountains) rather than surviving in exile from the disease and the lover. The third gift, the one that gets the peri into heaven, is a "Tear that, warm and meek/Dew'd that repentant sinner's cheek": the tear of an evil old man who repented upon seeing a child praying in the ruins of the Temple of Zeus at Baalbek. Robert Schumann set Moore's tale to music as an oratorio, Paradise and the Peri, using an abridged German translation.

== See also ==
- Dakini
- Iolanthe or The Peer and the Peri
