= Horst Tappert =

German actor

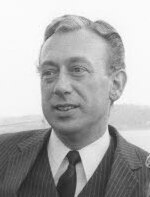
- Tappert in 1969
- Born: Horst Tappert; 26 May 1923; Elberfeld, Rhine Province, Prussia, Germany
- Died: 13 December 2008 (aged 85); Planegg, Bavaria, Germany
- Known for: "Stephan Derrick" in Derrick
- Height: 1.87 m (6 ft 2 in)
- Spouse: Ursula Pistor (m. 1957)
- Military Service
- Allegiance: Nazi Germany
- Branch: Waffen-SS
- Service years: 1943-1945
- Rank: Grenadier
- Unit: 3. SS-Panzergrenadier-Division Totenkopf
- Conflicts: World War II
- Awards: Bambi (1979, 1990, 1998); Telegatto (1986, 1987, 1990, 1999)
- Website: http://www.agentur-palz.de/Schauspieler/horst_tappert.htm

Horst Tappert (26 May 1923 – 13 December 2008) was a German film and television actor best known for the role of Inspector Stephan Derrick in the television drama Derrick.

== Biography ==
Horst Tappert was born on 26 May 1923 in Elberfeld (now Wuppertal), Germany. His father, Julius Tappert (1892–1957), was a civil servant; his mother was Ewaldine Röll Tappert (1892–1981). Following high school and at the age of 17, Tappert was drafted into the German Army during World War II. Aged 19, he was, according to his widow against his will, transferred from the Army to the Waffen-SS, where the author of the Derrick series, Herbert Reinecker, had also served. Initially a member of a reserve anti-aircraft unit in Arolsen, he was listed as a grenadier with the 3rd SS Division Totenkopf in March 1943. In 1945, he was briefly a prisoner of war in Seehausen, Altmark. Following the war, he was hired as a bookkeeper at a theatre in Stendal, Germany, and became interested in acting. He took acting classes and gave his stage debut in Stendal, playing Dr. Stribel in Paul Helwig's Die Flitterwochen.

In the following years, he changed employers several times, and in 1956, started working at the Kammerspiele, Munich. An independent actor since 1967, he worked as an actor until he died.

In the late 1950s, Tappert started taking part in movie and television productions. His big breakthrough was in 1966 with the three-part television show Die Gentlemen bitten zur Kasse, in which he played train robber Michael Donegan. In 1968, he changed sides by playing Scotland Yard detective Perkins in Edgar Wallace movies. In 1970–71, he co-starred in three crime dramas directed by Jesus Franco, She Killed in Ecstasy, The Deadly Avenger of Soho and The Devil Came from Akasava.

When the second public television station in West Germany, the ZDF, started planning a new mystery series with a different type of investigator in 1973, he was chosen for the character of detective Stephan Derrick, with sidekick assistant Harry Klein (played by Fritz Wepper). The character Stephan Derrick became a cult figure. The series was licensed in 104 countries and was popular with audiences in China, Japan, and Italy (and even Pope John Paul II). The last of 281 episodes was filmed in 1998, when Tappert reached his self-imposed age limit of 75 years old for being a television actor.

== Personal life ==
Divorced twice, he last lived in Gräfelfing near Munich with his third wife, Ursula Pistor (married in 1957). He was the father of three children. Tappert enjoyed fishing and hunting. He had a summer holiday home on the coast of northern Norway, a country where he also became a popular visitor, as Derrick, as well as a private person. Tappert and his wife Ursula had a cabin in Hamarøy Municipality in Nordland from 1990 to 2008, when due to his age and failing health, they had to sell the cabin. His wife Ursula Pistor is also an actor, a graduate of the same acting school in Berlin as Ellinor Hamsun, daughter of Knut Hamsun.

In interviews and his memoirs, Tappert did not elaborate on his World War II career, claiming to have served as a company medic in the Wehrmacht, after which he became a prisoner of war. In April 2013, he was revealed to have joined the 3. SS-Panzergrenadier-Division Totenkopf, then deployed on the Eastern Front, in March 1943. Historian Jan Erik Schulte, an expert on the history of the SS, said that the circumstances of Tappert's membership in the SS and the question of whether he was pressured or coerced into joining remain unclear.

Following the discovery of Tappert's service with the Waffen SS during the war, German broadcaster ZDF dropped all repeats of Derrick. Similarly, Bavaria's interior ministry said it was considering stripping the late actor of an honorary chief police inspector title awarded to Tappert in 1980.

Tappert died on 13 December 2008 in Planegg, Germany at age 85.

== Filmography ==
- 1950: Doctor Praetorius - Verkäufer (uncredited)
- 1958: The Trapp Family in America (with Ruth Leuwerik)
- 1958: Wir Wunderkinder (Aren't We Wonderful?) (with Hansjörg Felmy, Robert Graf, Johanna von Koczian) - Teacher Schindler
- 1958: Arms and the Man (AAN as Best Foreign Film) (with O. W. Fischer, Liselotte Pulver, Ellen Schwiers, Jan Hendriks)
- 1959: The Angel Who Pawned Her Harp (with Nana Osten, Henry Vahl, Ullrich Haupt) - Herr Parker
- 1959: Jacqueline (with Johanna von Koczian, Walter Reyer, Götz George, Hans Söhnker) - Haack, Journalist
- 1959: The Beautiful Adventure (with Liselotte Pulver, Robert Graf, Bruni Löbel) - Frécon
- 1959: Ruf ohne Echo (TV film) (with Hans Christian Blech) - Pierre
- 1961: Zu viele Köche (TV miniseries) (with Heinz Klevenow, Joachim Fuchsberger, Karl Michael Vogler) - Hoteldetektiv Odell
- 1961: Ein schöner Tag (TV film) (with Joachim Teege, Hugo Lindinger, Trude Hesterberg) - Er
- 1961: Küß mich Kätchen (TV film) (with Peter Carsten, Harald Leipnitz, Christiane Maybach) - Erster Ganove
- 1962: Das Halstuch (TV miniseries) (with Heinz Drache, Albert Lieven, Erica Beer, Eckart Dux) - Vikar Nigel Matthews
- 1962: He Can't Stop Doing It (with Heinz Rühmann, Rudolf Forster, Grit Boettcher, Lina Carstens) - Simpson
- 1962: Snow White and the Seven Jugglers - Hugendobler, Künstleragent
- 1963: Das tödliche Patent (TV film) (with Wolfgang Preiss, Gisela Trowe, Siegfried Lowitz) - Inspector Morland
- 1963: Zwei Whisky und ein Sofa (Whiskey and Sofa) (with Maria Schell, Karl Michael Vogler, Robert Graf) - Krause
- 1963: Leonce und Lena (TV film) (with Dieter Kirchlechner, Gertrud Kückelmann) - King Peter of the Kingdom of Popo
- 1964: Der Aussichtsturm (TV film) (with Claudia Sorbas, Konrad Georg, Monika John) - Eliott Nash
- 1964: Sechs Personen suchen einen Autor (TV film) (with Helmut Förnbacher, Robert Freitag) - Regisseur
- 1965: Eine reine Haut (TV Movie) (with Herbert Fleischmann) - Harry
- 1966: Die Gentlemen bitten zur Kasse (The Great British Train Robbery) (TV miniseries) (with Hans Cossy, Günther Neutze) - Michael Donegan
- 1966: Ein Tag in Paris (TV film) (with Paula Denk, Ingeborg Solbrig, Peter Fröhlich) - Boury
- 1966: Der Kinderdieb (TV film) (with Isolde Bräuner, Lucie Mannheim, Walter Jokisch) - Colonel Bigua
- 1966: Das ganz große Ding (TV film) (with Carl-Heinz Schroth, Brigitte Grothum) - Jimmy Warren
- 1966: Der Mann aus Melbourne (TV film) (with Herbert Stass, Alf Marholm, Roma Bahn) - Der Fremde
- 1966: Jerry Cotton: Die Rechnung – eiskalt serviert (with George Nader, Heinz Weiss) - Charles Anderson
- 1966: Four Queens for an Ace - Man in Restaurant (uncredited)
- 1966: Der schwarze Freitag (TV film) (with Curd Jürgens, Dieter Borsche) - Narrator (voice)
- 1967: Liebe für Liebe (TV film) (with Wolfgang Büttner, Helmut Griem, Klaus Löwitsch) - Scandal
- 1968: The New Life Style (with Charlotte Kerr) - Walter Bergmann / Travel agency owner
- 1968: The Hound of Blackwood Castle (with Heinz Drache, Karin Baal, Hans Söhnker, Agnes Windeck) - Donald Fairbanks
- 1968: Das Kriminalmuseum: Die Reifenspur (TV series) - Friedrich Groth
- 1968: The Gorilla of Soho (with Uschi Glas, Uwe Friedrichsen, Hubert von Meyerinck) - Insp. David Perkins
- 1969: The Man with the Glass Eye (with Karin Hübner, Fritz Wepper, Hubert von Meyerinck) - Insp. Perkins
- 1969: Seven Days Grace (with Joachim Fuchsberger, Konrad Georg, Karin Hübner, Petra Schürmann) - Klevenow
- 1970: Perrak (with Erika Pluhar, Judy Winter, Werner Peters) - Kommissar Perrak
- 1971: The Devil Came from Akasava (with Soledad Miranda, directed by Jesus Franco) - Dr. Andrew Thorrsen
- 1971: Und Jimmy ging zum Regenbogen (The Caesar Code) (with Alain Noury, Ruth Leuwerik, Horst Frank, Judy Winter, Doris Kunstmann) - Dr. Otto Forster
- 1971: The Love Keys (with Heidi Hansen, Uwe Friedrichsen, Siegfried Schürenberg) - Stubenrauch
- 1971: The Captain (with Heinz Rühmann, Johanna Matz, Ernst Stankovski, Horst Janson) - Konsul Carstens
- 1971: She Killed in Ecstasy (with Soledad Miranda, directed by Jesus Franco) - Inspector
- 1972: The Deadly Avenger of Soho (directed by Jesus Franco) - Charles Barton
- 1972: Hoopers letzte Jagd (TV film) (with Max Mairich, Liselotte Pulver, Florian Halm) - Michael Richardson
- 1973: Eine Frau bleibt eine Frau (TV miniseries) (with Lilli Palmer) - Oberstudienrat
- 1974: Plus minus null (TV film) (with Anaid Iplicjian, Rolf Becker) - Schattat
- 1974–1998 Derrick (TV series) - Stephan Derrick
- 1974: Auch ich war nur ein mittelmäßiger Schüler (I Wasn't a Very Good Student Either) (with Jutta Speidel, Georg Thomalla, Rudolf Platte) - Dr. Siegfried Elsenbeck
- 1987: Cinématon
- 2000: Der Kardinal – Der Preis der Liebe (The Cardinal) (TV film) (with Christine Reinhart, Enzo De Caro) - Clemens Roetger
- 2001: In 80 Jahren um die Welt (TV film)
- 2003: The Uncrowned Heart (TV film) (with Eleonora Brigliadori, Franco Nero, Jacques Breuer) - Rudolph der Listige
- 2004: Derrick – Die Pflicht ruft (Derrick – The Feature Film) (Animated film with original voice of Tappert and Wepper) - Stephan Derrick (voice) (final film role)

== Books ==
- Tappert, Horst (1999). Derrick und ich. Meine zwei Leben [Derrick and I. My two lives] (1st ed.). Munich: Heyne-Verlag. ISBN 3-453-15000-7.
