= Susanne Uhlen =

German actress (born 1955)

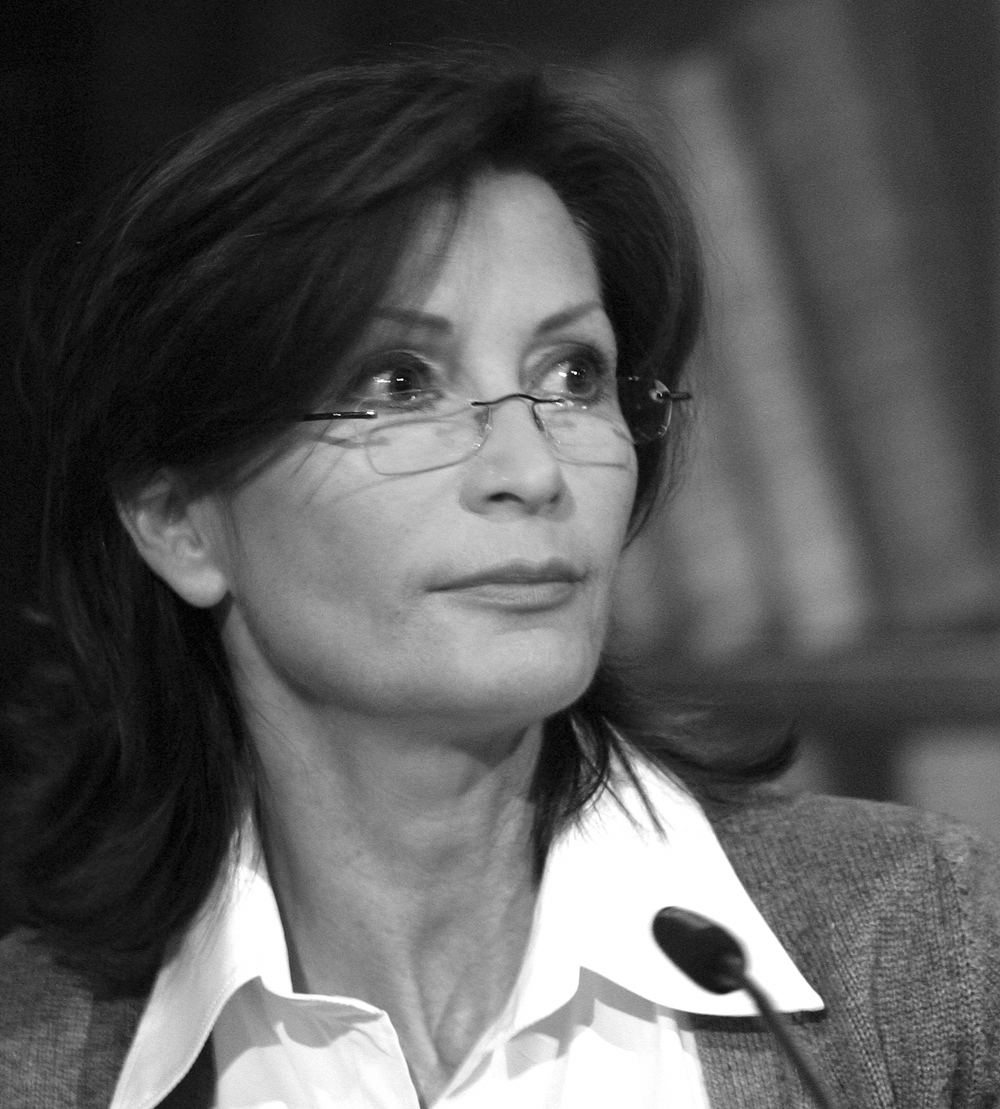
- Uhlen in 2008
- Born: Susanne Kieling; 17 January 1955 (age 71); Potsdam, East Germany
- Occupation: Actress
- Years active: 1966–present
- Spouse: Charly Steinberger (div. 1984)
- Partner(s): Herbert Herrmann (1981–1994); Henry Dawidowicz (1995–present)
- Children: 2
- Parents: Wolfgang Kieling (father); Gisela Uhlen (mother)
- Relatives: Max Schreck (uncle)

Susanne Uhlen (pronounced [zu.ˈza.nə ˈuː.lən]; born Susanne Kieling; January 17, 1955) is a German actress. She is the daughter of actors Wolfgang Kieling and Gisela Uhlen, and is niece to German actor, Max Schreck of Nosferatu fame.

== Career ==
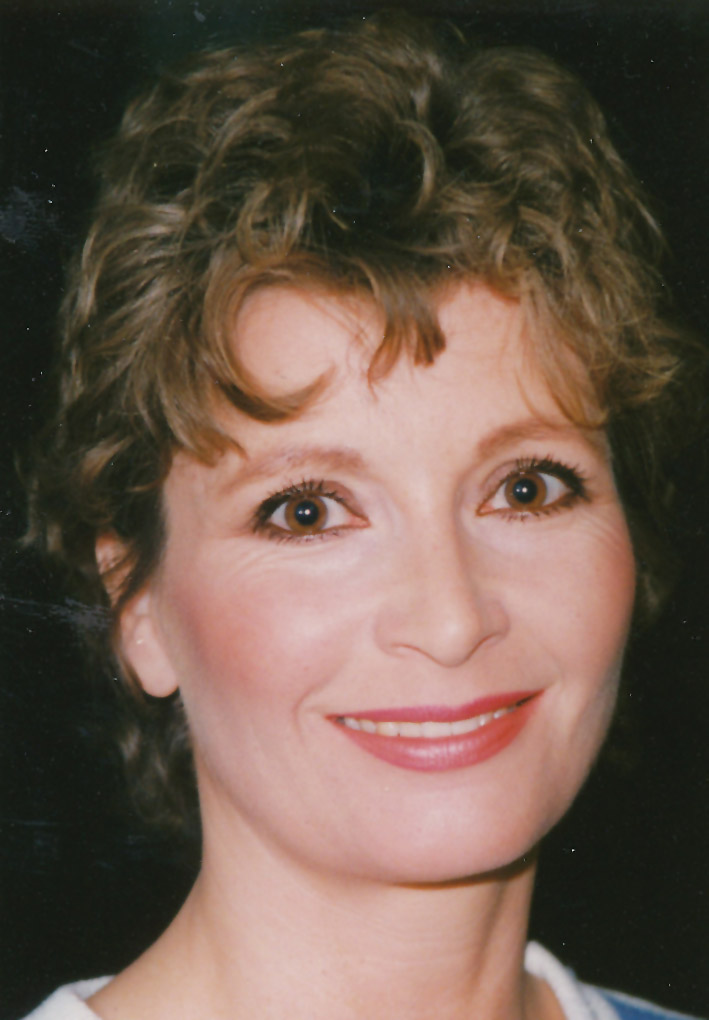
Susanne Uhlen

Uhlen began her acting career by doing acting spots in commercials as a child, and appeared in her first film at age 9. As a child, she changed schools each year, as her mother constantly had to relocate to keep up with acting commitments. At 16, she married a fellow student, but her mother became involved and ended the marriage. She then married cameraman Charly Steinberger, with whom she had one son. By this time her acting career was flourishing, but her marriage to Steinberger ended shortly after the birth of their child.

== Personal life ==
In 1981, she met actor Herbert Herrmann, with whom she would have a thirteen-year relationship, producing one child, Christopher Kieling. She has starred in numerous successful German television series, which she continues to do today, along with many film and theater appearances. In 1995, she met and became involved with her current partner, Henry Dawidowicz, a corporate manager for a cosmetics company.

== Selected filmography ==
- The Murderer with the Silk Scarf (1966, directed by Adrian Hoven)
- When Sweet Moonlight Is Sleeping in the Hills (1969, directed by Wolfgang Liebeneiner)
- Angels with Burnt Wings (1970, directed by Zbyněk Brynych)
- Birdie (1971, directed by Hubert Frank)
- Der Kommissar - Season 3, Episode 5: "Lagankes Verwandte" (1971, TV)
- Der Kommissar - Season 6, Episode 7: "Mit den Augen eines Mörders" (1974, TV)
- Die Stadt im Tal (1975, TV film)
- To the Bitter End (1975, directed by Gerd Oswald)
- The Net (1975, directed by Manfred Purzer)
- Derrick - Season 2, Episode 4: "Madeira" (1975, TV)
- Lady Audley's Secret (1978, TV film)
- Derrick - Season 11, Episode 3: "Manuels Pfleger" (1984, TV)
- Das Erbe der Guldenburgs (1986–1990, TV series)
- A Slip of the Disc (1987, TV film)
- Derrick - Season 22, Episode 12: "Mitternachtssolo" (1995, TV)
- Derrick - Season 12, Episode 8: "Schwester Hilde" (1985, TV)
