= Only the Wind Knows the Answer =

1974 film

- Film poster
- Directed by: Alfred Vohrer
- Screenplay by: Manfred Purzer
- Based on: The Wind and The Rain (novel) by Johannes Mario Simmel
- Produced by: Luggi Waldleitner
- Starring: Maurice Ronet; Marthe Keller; Karin Dor
- Cinematography: Petrus R. Schlömp
- Edited by: Ingeborg Taschner
- Music by: Erich Ferstl
- Production companies: Roxy Film; Paris-Cannes Productions
- Distributed by: Constantin Film
- Release date: 20 November 1974 (West Germany)
- Running time: 107 minutes
- Countries: West Germany; France
- Language: German

Only the Wind Knows the Answer (German: Die Antwort kennt nur der Wind) is a 1974 West German-French thriller film directed by Alfred Vohrer and starring Maurice Ronet, Marthe Keller and Karin Dor. It was entered into the 9th Moscow International Film Festival. Location shooting took place on the French Riviera, Zurich, Frankfurt and Munich. The film is a very loose remake of Hound of Blackwood Castle, with some key differences to the plot and the removal of the ‘Edgar Wallace Krimi’ brand.

== Plot ==
A millionaire and his crew are killed when his yacht explodes. An insurance detective investigates and soon realises that there is more behind the spectacular accident than meets the eye.

== Cast ==
- Maurice Ronet as Robert Lucas
- Marthe Keller as Angela Delpierre
- Raymond Pellegrin as Inspector Lacrosse
- Karin Dor as Nicole Monnier
- André Falcon as Mr. Ribeyrolles
- Anton Diffring as John Keelwood
- Robert Dalban as the Chief Inspector
- Christian Barbier as Inspector Dupin
- Philippe Baronnet as Alain
- Walter Kohut as Heinz Seeberg
- Charlotte Kerr as Hilde Hellmann
- Eva Pflug as Karin Lucas
- Herbert Fleischmann as Gustav Brandenburg
- Klaus Schwarzkopf
- Heinz Baumann
- Konrad Georg
