= To the Bitter End =

- Maurice Ronet and Ferdy Mayne
- Directed by: Gerd Oswald
- Written by: Manfred Purzer; Johannes Mario Simmel (novel)
- Produced by: Luggi Waldleitner
- Starring: Maurice Ronet; Suzy Kendall; Susanne Uhlen
- Cinematography: Charly Steinberger
- Edited by: Liselotte Klimitscheck
- Music by: Klaus Doldinger
- Production companies: Roxy Film; Wien-Film
- Distributed by: Constantin Film
- Release date: 23 October 1975
- Running time: 105 minutes
- Countries: Austria; West Germany
- Language: German

To the Bitter End (German: Bis zur bitteren Neige) is a 1975 West German-Austrian drama film directed by Gerd Oswald and starring Maurice Ronet, Suzy Kendall and Susanne Uhlen.

It was shot on location around Vienna.

== Synopsis ==
A former film star now enjoying a dissolute lifestyle funded by his wealthy wife, is offered a chance for a comeback role in a production about to start shooting.

== Cast ==
- Maurice Ronet as Paul Jordan
- Suzy Kendall as Joan Jordan
- Susanne Uhlen as Shirley Jordan
- Christine Wodetzky as Natascha Petrowna
- Karl Renar as Mörtl
- Balduin Baas as Fogosch
- Rudolf Fernau as Schauberg
- Herbert Prikopa as Polzfuss
- Wolfgang Gasser as Schinzel
- Heinz Marecek as Chuc O'Donovan
- Regine Felden-Hatheyer as Anita Smetana
- Maria Guttenbrunner as Jeanette Remy
- Fritz Goblirsch as Kamera-Assistant
- Manfred Spies as Jerry
- Erich Padalewski as Lehrer
- Ferdy Mayne as Wallace

== Bibliography ==
- Goble, Alan. The Complete Index to Literary Sources in Film. Walter de Gruyter, 1999.
