= Judy Winter =

German actress

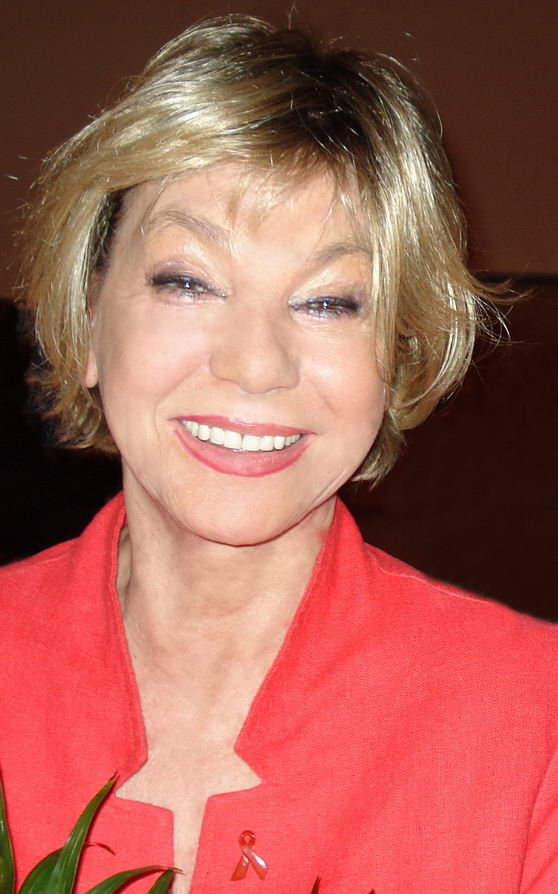
- Born: Beate Richard; 4 January 1944 (age 82); Friedland, Upper Silesia, Prussia, Germany
- Occupation: Actress
- Website: judy-winter.de

Judy Winter (pronounced [ˈd͡ʒuː.di ˈvɪn.tɐ]; born Beate Richard; 4 January 1944) is a German actress. She resides in Berlin.

== Filmography ==
=== Film ===
- 1970: The Sex Nest
- 1970: Perrak
- 1970: The Females
- 1971: Und Jimmy ging zum Regenbogen — (based on a novel by Johannes Mario Simmel)
- 1971: Love Is Only a Word — (based on a novel by Johannes Mario Simmel)
- 1972: Shadows Unseen
- 1973: ...aber Jonny!
- 1974: Der Lord von Barmbeck
- 1980: The Dream House
- 1980: Der Mann, der sich in Luft auflöste — (based on The Man Who Went Up in Smoke by Sjöwall and Wahlöö)
- 1984: Ärztinnen — (based on a play by Rolf Hochhuth)
- 1997: Sisters from Hell
- 2007: Neues vom Wixxer

=== Television ===
- 1963: Erwin und Elmire — (based on Erwin und Elmire)
- 1965: Held Henry — (based on Henry V)
- 1966: Frühlings Erwachen — (based on Spring Awakening)
- 1966: Die Unberatenen — (based on a novel by Thomas Valentin)
- 1971: "Hamburg Transit": Blondinen im Schussfeld
- 1973: Im Zeichen der Kälte
- 1973: "Sonderdezernat K1": Kassensturz um Mitternacht
- 1973: Van der Valk und die Reichen — (based on a novel by Nicolas Freeling)
- 1973: "Der Kommissar": Tod eines Buchhändlers
- 1974: Zinngeschrei — (based on a radio play by Günter Eich)
- 1974: Frau von Bebenburg — (based on a story by Arthur Schnitzler)
- 1975: "Tatort": Tod eines Einbrechers
- 1975: Schließfach 763
- 1975: "Berlin – 0:00 bis 24:00"
- 1975: Im Werk notiert
- 1975: "Derrick" – Season 2, Episode 7: "Hoffmanns Höllenfahrt"
- 1975: Im Hause des Kommerzienrates — (based on a novel by E. Marlitt)
- 1976: "Derrick" – Season 3, Episode 10: "Das Bordfest"
- 1976: Partner gesucht
- 1977: "Sonderdezernat K1": Tod eines Schrankenwärters
- 1977: "Tatort": Reifezeugnis (For Your Love Only)
- 1978: Die Eingeschlossenen — (based on The Condemned of Altona)
- 1978: Angst — (based on Fear)
- 1979: Nathan der Weise — (based on Nathan the Wise)
- 1979: "Derrick" – Season 6, Episode 9: "Ein Kongreß in Berlin"
- 1979: Glücksucher — (screenplay by Dieter Wellershoff)
- 1980: Eingriffe
- 1981: Leiche auf Urlaub — (based on a novel by Boileau-Narcejac)
- 1981: Ein zauberhaftes Biest
- 1981: Children — (based on Children)
- 1981: Der Fall Maurizius — (based on a novel by Jakob Wassermann)
- 1982: Stella — (based on Goethe's play)
- 1982: Die Stunde des Löwen
- 1982: Dr. Margarete Johnsohn — (based on a play by Volker Elis Pilgrim)
- 1982: Der Auslöser
- 1983: Die Falle
- 1984: Das schöne Ende dieser Welt
- 1984: "Geschichten aus Kalmüsel" – Zwei schwarze Schafe
- 1984: House Guest — (based on a play by Francis Durbridge)
- 1985: Le Paria
- 1986: Vicky und Nicky
- 1986: Der Schatz im Niemandsland
- 1986: Jimmy Allegretto
- 1986: Die Fräulein von damals
- 1986: Die Brücke am schwarzen Fluß
- 1988: An Odd Couple — (based on a story by Dieter Wellershoff)
- 1988: Come into My Parlor — (based on a play by Joseph Hayes)
- 1988: Die aufrichtige Lügnerin — (based on L'Idiote)
- 1989: Tam, Tam oder Wohin die Reise geht
- 1989: Besuch
- 1990: Dornröschen
- 1991: Tod auf Bali
- 1992: Der Fotograf oder Das Auge Gottes
- 1992: "Wolffs Revier": Wohnungstod
- 1993: König & Consorten
- 1993: Ein unvergessliches Wochenende ... auf Capri
- 1993: "Glückliche Reise": Südafrika
- 1993: Vater braucht eine Frau
- 1993: "Ein Fall für zwei": Gelegenheit macht Mörder
- 1994: "Ein Fall für zwei": Das fremde Herz
- 1994: "Doppelter Einsatz": Schichtwechsel
- 1995: Sterne des Südens
- 1995: "A.S.": Bitte töte ihn
- 1995: Club Las Piranjas
- 1996: Butterfly Feelings
- 1996: Ehebruch: Eine teuflische Falle!
- 1996: In the Wrong Hands
- 1996: Willkommen in Kronstadt
- 1998: Durch dick & dünn
- 1998: "Im Namen des Gesetzes": Der letzte Schlag
- 1999: "Dr. Sommerfeld – Neues vom Bülowbogen": Die Eisprinzessin
- 2001: "SOKO 5113": Nach dreißig Jahren
- 2002: "Alphateam – Die Lebensretter im OP": Rettet mein Kind
- 2003: Auch Erben will gelernt sein
- 2003: Mädchen, böses Mädchen
- 2003: "Der kleine Mönch": Arme Reiche
- 2005: Brücke zum Herzen
- 2006: "In aller Freundschaft": Schein und Sein
- 2008: The Caesar Code
- 2012: Mom's Gotta Go
