= Klaus Schwarzkopf =

German actor (1922–1991)

- Born: 18 December 1922; Neuruppin, Germany
- Died: 21 June 1991 (aged 68); Bochum, Germany
- Occupation: Actor

Klaus Schwarzkopf (18 December 1922, in Neuruppin – 21 June 1991, in Bochum) was a German actor. From 1971 until 1978 he starred in the Norddeutscher Rundfunk version of the popular television crime series Tatort. He was also known as a respected stage actor and for being the German dubbing voice of Peter Falk as Columbo during the 1970s.

Schwarzkopf was gay, but never disclosed it. Schwarzkopf died in 1991 of AIDS.

== Filmography ==
=== Film ===
- 1956: Bonjour Kathrin (directed by Karl Anton), as Neighbour (uncredited)
- 1961: Freddy and the Millionaire (directed by Paul May), as Policeman (voice, uncredited)
- 1965: Praetorius (directed by Kurt Hoffmann), as Dr. Watzmann
- 1967: Glorious Times at the Spessart Inn (directed by Kurt Hoffmann), as Roland
- 1968: Artists Under the Big Top: Perplexed (directed by Alexander Kluge), as Gerloff, philologist
- 1971: Und Jimmy ging zum Regenbogen (directed by Alfred Vohrer), as Sirius
- 1971: Jailbreak in Hamburg (directed by Wolfgang Staudte), as Police commissioner Knudsen
- 1972: The Stuff That Dreams Are Made Of (directed by Alfred Vohrer), as Dr. Wolfgang Erkner
- 1973: All People Will Be Brothers (directed by Alfred Vohrer), as Boris Minski
- 1974: Three Men in the Snow (directed by Alfred Vohrer), as Otto Tobler
- 1974: One or the Other of Us (directed by Wolfgang Petersen), as Professor Rüdiger Kolczyk
- 1974: Only the Wind Knows the Answer (directed by Alfred Vohrer), as Vicar
- 1985: Grünstein's Clever Move (directed by Bernhard Wicki), as Spiros the Greek

=== Television ===
- 1964: Nachtzug D 106 (TV film), as Zugkellner
- 1964: Flug in Gefahr (TV film), as Harry Burdick
- 1966: Zehn Prozent (TV film), as Oberregierungsrat Frühwirth
- 1968: Spravedlnost pro Selvina (TV film), as Frank Selvin
- 1969: Der Kommissar: Ratten der Großstadt (TV series episode), as Krüger
- 1969: Bitte recht freundlich, es wird geschossen (TV film), as Frank Crawford
- 1969: Christoph Kolumbus oder Die Entdeckung Amerikas (TV film), as Vendrino
- 1970: Like a Tear in the Ocean (TV miniseries), as Petrowitsch
- 1970: The Man Who Sold the Eiffel Tower (TV film), as Gaston Villier
- 1971: Der Kommissar: Besuch bei Alberti (TV series episode), as Gerhard Sidessen
- 1971: Tatort: Blechschaden (TV series episode), as Kommissar Finke
- 1972: Tatort: Strandgut (TV series episode), as Kommissar Finke
- 1973: Der Kommissar: Rudek (TV series episode), as Georg Hauffe
- 1973: Tatort: Jagdrevier (TV series episode), as Kommissar Finke
- 1974: Tatort: Nachtfrost (TV series episode), as Kommissar Finke
- 1974: Der Kommissar: Tod eines Landstreichers (TV series episode), as Pock
- 1974: Eintausend Milliarden (TV film), as Müller-Mend
- 1975: Die unfreiwilligen Reisen des Moritz August Benjowski (TV miniseries), as Don Pacheco
- 1975: Tatort: Kurzschluß (TV series episode), as Kommissar Finke
- 1976: Sladek oder Die schwarze Armee (TV film, based on a play by Ödön von Horváth), as Untersuchungsrichter
- 1977: Tatort: Reifezeugnis (TV series episode), as Kommissar Finke
- 1977: Die Dämonen (TV miniseries, based on Dostoyevsky's Demons), as Anton L. Grigoreff / Narrator
- 1978: Tatort: Himmelfahrt (TV series episode), as Kommissar Finke
- 1979: Die Buddenbrooks (TV miniseries, based on Thomas Mann's Buddenbrooks), as Jesselmeyer
- 1980: Derrick: Pricker (TV series episode), as Alfred Pricker
- 1982: The Confessions of Felix Krull (TV miniseries, based on Thomas Mann's Confessions of Felix Krull), as Felix Krull's Father
- 1982: Das blaue Bidet (based on an essay by Joseph Breitbach) (TV film), as Barbe
- 1983: Gin Romme (TV film)
- 1984: Die Rückkehr der Zeitmaschine (TV film), as Dr. Erasmus Beilowski
- 1985: Derrick: Lange Nacht für Derrick (TV series episode), as Dr. Bomann
- 1985: Der Fahnder: S.O.S. am Sonntag (TV series episode), as Willie Spiegel
- 1986: Liebling Kreuzberg: Doppeleinsatz (TV series episode), as Dagobert Gruber
- 1986: Derrick: Die Nacht, in der Ronda starb (TV series episode), as Dr. Walter Schenk
- 1986: Die Stunde des Léon Bisquet (TV film), as Léon Bisquet
- 1987–1992: Praxis Bülowbogen (TV series, 18 episodes), as "Gleisdreieck"
- 1980: Derrick: Kein Risiko (TV series episode), as Ingo Wecker
- 1988: The Old Fox: Ein ganz gewöhnlicher Mord (TV series episode), as Rudolf Ballat
- 1990: Die Richterin (TV film), as Benjamin Hofmann
