= Love Is Only a Word =

- Directed by: Alfred Vohrer
- Screenplay by: Manfred Purzer
- Based on: Love is Just a Word (novel) by Johannes Mario Simmel
- Produced by: Erwin Gitt; Luggi Waldleitner
- Starring: Judy Winter; Herbert Fleischmann; Malte Thorsten
- Cinematography: Charly Steinberger
- Edited by: Jutta Hering
- Music by: Erich Ferstl
- Production company: Roxy Film
- Distributed by: Constantin Film
- Release date: 12 November 1971
- Running time: 111 minutes
- Country: West Germany
- Language: German

Love Is Only a Word (German: Liebe ist nur ein Wort) is a 1971 West German drama film directed by Alfred Vohrer and starring Judy Winter, Herbert Fleischmann and Malte Thorsten.

== Plot ==
21-year-old Oliver Mansfeld, the son of a corrupt industrialist, is attending a boarding school in order to obtain a school leaving degree, which he failed to do in his younger years. He falls head over heels in love with Verena Angenfort, ten years his senior. However, she is married to a much older banker who does business with Oliver's father. Verena and Oliver begin a turbulent but short-lived affair. Mansfeld does not see through the web of intrigues and entanglements around him in time and finally commits suicide.

== Cast ==
- Judy Winter as Verena Angenfort
- Herbert Fleischmann as Manfred Angenfort
- Malte Thorsten as Oliver Mansfeld
- Donata Höffer as Geraldine Reber
- Karl Walter Diess as Butler Leo
- Joey Schoenfelder as Hansi
- Konrad Georg as Professor
- Friedrich Siemers as Dr. Florian
- Bernd Redecker as Walter Colland
- Manuel Iregsusi as Raschid
- Friedrich G. Beckhaus as Kommissar Hardenberg
- Holger Hagen as Dr. Haberl
- Inge Langen as Katharina Mansfeld, Olivers Mutter
- Dieter Wagner as Deutschlehrer
- Ossi Eckmüller as Zollbeamter
- Gretl Schörg as Pflegerin
- Elisabeth Volkmann as Angenforts Sekretärin
- Franz Rudnick as Kasilowski
- Frank Süssenguth as Pilot Teddy Behnke

== Bibliography ==
- Bock, Hans-Michael; Bergfelder, Tim, eds. (2009). The Concise Cinegraph: Encyclopedia of German Cinema. Berghahn Books. ISBN 978-1-57181-655-9.
