= Manfred Purzer =

German screenwriter

- Born: 13 April 1931 (age 95); Munich, Germany
- Occupations: Screenwriter; Film director
- Years active: 1955-1993

Manfred Purzer (born 13 April 1931) is a German screenwriter and film director. He wrote more than 20 films between 1955 and 1993. In 1974, he was a member of the jury at the 24th Berlin International Film Festival.

== Selected filmography ==
=== Screenwriter ===
- Komm nur, mein liebstes Vögelein (dir. Rolf Thiele, 1968) — based on a book by Joachim Fernau
- Seven Days Grace (dir. Alfred Vohrer, 1969) — based on a novel by Paul Henricks
- Herzblatt oder Wie sag ich’s meiner Tochter? (dir. Alfred Vohrer, 1969)
- The Sex Nest (dir. Alfred Vohrer, 1970) — based on a novel by Bengta Bischoff
- Perrak (dir. Alfred Vohrer, 1970)
- The Females (dir. Zbyněk Brynych, 1970)
- Und Jimmy ging zum Regenbogen (dir. Alfred Vohrer, 1971) — based on a novel by Johannes Mario Simmel
- Der neue heiße Sex-Report – Was Männer nicht für möglich halten (dir. Ernst Hofbauer, 1971)
- Love Is Only a Word (dir. Alfred Vohrer, 1971) — based on a novel by Johannes Mario Simmel
- The Stuff That Dreams Are Made Of (dir. Alfred Vohrer, 1972) — based on a novel by Johannes Mario Simmel
- Tears of Blood (dir. Alfred Vohrer, 1972) — based on The Blizzard by Alexander Pushkin
- All People Will Be Brothers (dir. Alfred Vohrer, 1973) — based on a novel by Johannes Mario Simmel
- The Sibyl Cipher (dir. Alfred Vohrer, 1973) — based on a novel by Johannes Mario Simmel
- Three Men in the Snow (dir. Alfred Vohrer, 1974) — based on a novel by Erich Kästner
- One or the Other of Us (dir. Wolfgang Petersen, 1974) — based on a novel by Horst Bosetzky
- Only the Wind Knows the Answer (dir. Alfred Vohrer, 1975) — based on a novel by Johannes Mario Simmel
- To the Bitter End (dir. Gerd Oswald, 1975) — based on a novel by Johannes Mario Simmel
- Lili Marleen (dir. Rainer Werner Fassbinder, 1981)
- Crazy Jungle Adventure (dir. Harald Reinl, 1982)
- How Would You Like to Have It? (dir. Rolf von Sydow, 1983)
- A King for Burning (dir. Tom Toelle, 1993, TV film)
- Die Elefantenbraut (dir. Dietrich Haugk, 1994, TV film)
- Tödliche Diamanten (dir. Celino Bleiweiß, 1998, TV film)

=== Director ===
- The Net (1975) — based on a novel by Hans Habe
- The Elixirs of the Devil (1976) — based on The Devil's Elixirs by E. T. A. Hoffmann
- The Man in the Rushes (1978) — based on a novel by George Saiko
- Randale (1983)
