= Perrak =

1970 film

- Directed by: Alfred Vohrer
- Written by: Manfred Purzer
- Produced by: Erwin Gitt; Luggi Waldleitner
- Starring: Horst Tappert; Werner Peters; Hubert Suschka
- Cinematography: Ernst W. Kalinke
- Edited by: Jutta Hering; Susanne Paschen
- Music by: Rolf Kühn
- Production company: Roxy Film
- Distributed by: Inter-Verleih Film
- Release date: 24 April 1970
- Running time: 84 minutes
- Country: West Germany
- Language: German

Perrak is a 1970 West German crime thriller film directed by Alfred Vohrer and starring Horst Tappert, Werner Peters and Hubert Suschka. It was shot at the Bendestorf Studios near Hamburg. The film's sets were designed by the art directors Wolf Englert and Günther Kob.

== Synopsis ==
Kommissar Perrak of Hamburg's vice squad leads an investigation following an unusual murder tied to the city's prostitution quarter.

== Cast ==
- Horst Tappert as Kommissar Perrak
- Werner Peters as Heinz-Fritz Bottke
- Hubert Suschka as Karl Kaminski
- Walter Richter as Wermuth-Ede
- Erika Pluhar as Claire Imhoff
- Judy Winter as Emma Kastelbauer, 'Trompeten-Emma'
- Wolf Roth as Nick
- Berno von Cramm as Uwe Klaus
- Carl Lange as Police President
- Hans Daniel as Oblomow
- Arthur Brauss as Casanova
- Hans Schellbach as Friedrich Imhoff
- Jochen Busse as Dr. Rembold
- Georg M. Fischer as Joschi Perrak
- Gilbert-André Ehoulan as Bimbo
- Ramonita Vargas as Transvestit Kosy
- Angie Stardust as Transvestit Pinky
- Rudolf Erbert as Gerichtsmediziner

== Bibliography ==
- Kramp, Joachim· Hallo! Hier spricht Edgar Wallace: die Geschichte der deutschen Kriminalfilmserie 1959–1972. Schwarzkopf & Schwarzkopf, 2001.
- Naumann, Gerd & Kramp, Joachim. Die Jerry-Cotton-Filme. Ibidem-Verlag, 2011.
