= Tilo von Berlepsch =

German actor (1913–1991)

- Born: 30 December 1913
- Died: 8 April 1991 (aged 77)
- Occupation: Actor
- Years active: 1949–1977

Tilo von Berlepsch (30 December 1913 – 8 April 1991) was a German actor. He appeared in more than 90 films and television shows between 1949 and 1977. He came from the Berlepsch family and was a grandson of the ornithologist Hans Hermann Carl Ludwig von Berlepsch. He made his acting debut in Berlin in 1933. After 1945 he was able to continue his long-stage career at numerous German theaters.

== Partial filmography ==
- Love '47 (1949) - Vetter Fritz
- Amico (1949) - Freddy Müller
- Immortal Beloved (1951) - Kurt von der Risch
- Veronika, die Magd (1951)
- Der Tag vor der Hochzeit (1952) - (uncredited)
- Have Sunshine in Your Heart (1953) - Arzt
- Hocuspocus (1953)
- Under the Stars of Capri (1953) - Claus
- Königliche Hoheit (1953) - Adjutant Graf Schellenberg
- Dein Mund verspricht mir Liebe (1954) - Kriminalrat Zorn
- The Immenhof Girls (1955) - Gerichtsvollzieher
- Mamitschka (1955) - Baron Hiebel
- The Barrings (1955) - Emanuel von Eyff
- Drei Mädels vom Rhein (1955)
- Die wilde Auguste (1956) - Chefredakteur
- Friederike von Barring (1956) - Emanuel von Eyff
- Vater macht Karriere (1957) - Freiherr Professor von Makkeprang
- Lilli (1958) - Schiffarzt
- Rosemary (1958) - Oelsen
- Liebe kann wie Gift sein (1958)
- Piefke, der Schrecken der Kompanie (1958) - Hauptmann Tilo von Weihrauch
- My Ninety Nine Brides (1958) - Konsul Hale
- Labyrinth (1959) - Graf
- Old Heidelberg (1959) - Kammerherr von Metzing
- Beloved Augustin (1960) - Herr von Ziwny
- Until Money Departs You (1960) - Dr. Stumpf
- The Marriage of Mr. Mississippi (1961) - Außenminister (uncredited)
- The Bread of Those Early Years (1962) - Vater Fendrich
- Moral 63 (1963) - Dr. Merkel, Ermittlungsrichter
- Der Hexer (1964) - Rezeptionist (uncredited)
- DM-Killer (1965) - Consul Moebius, Inge's Father
- Who Wants to Sleep? (1965)
- Long Legs, Long Fingers (1966) - Staatsanwalt
- The Hunchback of Soho (1966) - Polizeiarzt (uncredited)
- Tattoo (1967) - Lohmann's Brother
- The College Girl Murders (1967) - Polizeiarzt
- The Hound of Blackwood Castle (1968) - Lord Henry Beverton
- Komm nur, mein liebstes Vögelein (1968) - Baron
- The Man with the Glass Eye (1969) - Mr. Randel
- Come to Vienna, I'll Show You Something! (1970) - Talleyrand
- Gentlemen in White Vests (1970) - Juwelier Max Hase (uncredited)
- Die Feuerzangenbowle (1970) - Diener
- The Love Keys (1971)
- Our Willi Is the Best (1971) - Briefmarkensammler (uncredited)
- The Flying Classroom (1973) - Direktor Grünkern
- When Mother Went on Strike (1974)
- Dandelions (1974)
- Rosemary's Daughter (1976) - Fürst
