= The Stuff That Dreams Are Made Of (film) =

- Directed by: Alfred Vohrer
- Written by: Manfred Purzer
- Based on: The Stuff That Dreams Are Made Of by Johannes Mario Simmel
- Produced by: Luggi Waldleitner
- Starring: Edith Heerdegen; Hannelore Elsner; Herbert Fleischmann
- Cinematography: Charly Steinberger
- Edited by: Susanne Paschen
- Music by: Peter Thomas
- Production company: Roxy Film
- Distributed by: Constantin Film
- Release date: 20 September 1972
- Running time: 142 minutes
- Country: West Germany
- Language: German

The Stuff That Dreams Are Made Of (German: Der Stoff aus dem die Träume sind) is a 1972 West German thriller film directed by Alfred Vohrer and starring Edith Heerdegen, Hannelore Elsner and Herbert Fleischmann. It was adapted from a novel of the same title by the Austrian writer Johannes Mario Simmel.

== Synopsis ==
A West German investigative journalist becomes interested in the story of some defectors from Czechoslovakia who fled to the West after the crushing of the Prague Spring in 1968. When one of them is then killed, the involvement of several intelligence agencies becomes slowly apparent.

== Cast ==
- Edith Heerdegen as Luise Gottschalk
- Hannelore Elsner as Irina
- Herbert Fleischmann as Bertie Engelhardt
- Paul Neuhaus as Walter Roland
- Arno Assmann as Thomas Herford
- Paul Edwin Roth as Oswald Seerose
- Rick Parsé as Jan Bilka
- Heidi Stroh as Blondy
- Anton Diffring as CIA-Mann Simpson
- Charles Regnier as Prof. Vladimir Monerow
- Klaus Schwarzkopf as Dr. Wolfgang Erkner
- Günter Mack as Pastor Demel
- Friedrich G. Beckhaus as Herr Klein
- Konrad Georg as Jacques Jean Garnot
- Arthur Brauss as Genosse Michailow
- Malte Thorsten as Theo
- Ernst von Klipstein as Thomas Hem
- Gert Haucke as Zuhälter Karl Concon
- Eva Gelb as Prostituierte Tamara
- Walter Buschhoff as Kuschke
- Herbert Mensching as Zeuge Jehovas
- Franz Rudnick as Vaclav Bilka
- Dieter Wagner as Rogge
- Charles Brauer as Chefredakteur Lester
- Rainer Basedow as Cassin, Kellner im Hotel
- Hans Peter Hallwachs as Diener Notung
- Hans Daniel as Conny Eilers
- Arnold Marquis as Taxifahrer Fedor Georgi Iwanow

== Bibliography ==
- Bock, Hans-Michael & Bergfelder, Tim. The Concise CineGraph. Encyclopedia of German Cinema. Berghahn Books, 2009.
