= All People Will Be Brothers =

- Directed by: Alfred Vohrer
- Written by: Manfred Purzer; Johannes Mario Simmel (novel)
- Produced by: Erwin Gitt; Luggi Waldleitner
- Starring: Harald Leipnitz; Doris Kunstmann; Rainer von Artenfels
- Cinematography: Charly Steinberger
- Edited by: Ingeborg Taschner
- Music by: Erich Ferstl
- Production company: Roxy Film
- Distributed by: Constantin Film
- Release date: 15 March 1973
- Running time: 109 minutes
- Country: West Germany
- Language: German

All People Will Be Brothers (German: Alle Menschen werden Brüder) is a 1973 West German drama film directed by Alfred Vohrer and starring Harald Leipnitz, Doris Kunstmann and Rainer von Artenfels.

== Cast ==
- Harald Leipnitz as Werner Mark
- Doris Kunstmann as Lillian
- Rainer von Artenfels as Richard Mark
- Klaus Schwarzkopf as Boris Minski
- Herbert Fleischmann as Kommissar Eilers
- Konrad Georg as Paradin
- Elisabeth Volkmann as Vanessa
- Christiane Maybach as Die Rote
- Ingrid van Bergen as Nachtclub-Sängerin
- Alf Marholm as Delacorte
- Manfred Seipold as Kriminalbeamter Olsen
- Heinz Baumann as William Carpenter
- Alfred Balthoff as Mendel
- Michel Jacot as Ted
- Alexander Golling as Bauer
- Edith Schultze-Westrum as Frau Schermoly
- Hilde Brand as Frau Schermolys Assistantin
- Ingeborg Lapsien as Rachel Minski
- Herta Worell as Mrs. Buttermark
- Achim Hammer as Dr. Hess
- Eduard Linkers as Mann mit Bart
- Hermann Lenschau as Professor Mohn
- Roberto Blanco as Tiny

== Bibliography ==
- Bock, Hans-Michael & Bergfelder, Tim. The Concise CineGraph. Encyclopedia of German Cinema. Berghahn Books, 2009.
