= One or the Other of Us =

1974 film by Wolfgang Petersen

One or the Other of Us Einer von uns beiden
- Film poster
- Directed by: Wolfgang Petersen
- Written by: Manfred Purzer
- Based on: Einer von uns beiden by Horst Bosetzky (under the pseudonym -ky)
- Produced by: Luggi Waldleitner; Ilse Kubaschewski
- Starring: Klaus Schwarzkopf; Jürgen Prochnow; Elke Sommer; Ulla Jacobsson
- Cinematography: Charly Steinberger
- Edited by: Traude Krappl
- Music by: Klaus Doldinger
- Distributed by: Roxy Film; Divina-Film
- Release dates: February 22, 1974 (Theatrical premiere, Gloria-Palast, Berlin); February 12, 1982 (Television premiere, ZDF)
- Running time: 105 minutes
- Country: West Germany
- Language: German

One or the Other of Us (German: Einer von uns beiden) is a 1974 West German film directed by Wolfgang Petersen. It was Petersen's first theatrical feature film, and was based on the novel of the same name by Horst Bosetzky, published anonymously under his pseudonym -ky. The film is a psychological thriller and focuses on the intense conflict between a university professor and a blackmailer. The film features Klaus Schwarzkopf and Jürgen Prochnow as the two main characters and won two Bundesfilmpreise.

== Plot ==
Jürgen Prochnow and Klaus Schwarzkopf

Ziegenthals (Jürgen Prochnow), a failed student, makes ends meet as an academic ghost writer. By accident he discovers that the respected professor of sociology, Rüdiger Kolczyk (Klaus Schwarzkopf), plagiarized his doctoral dissertation by translating the work of an American scholar. He decides to blackmail Kolczyk and to ask for 10,000 DM and additional monthly payments of 1,500 DM. Kolczyk initially agrees, but vows to Ziegenhals that "only one of us will survive". Looking for a way to fight back, Kolczyk tries to gather information about Ziegenhals from Miezi (Elke Sommer), a prostitute and a housemate and friend of Ziegenhals. As Miezi has saved enough money she is thinking of leaving her profession. At the same time her violent ex-boyfriend and former pimp, Kalle Prötzel (Claus Theo Gärtner), has been released from prison; he murders her and steals her savings. During the investigations the police find out that Miezi had an appointment with Kolczyk and discovers the payments Kolczyk makes to Ziegenhals. Being the main suspects in the murder investigation only increases the hatred between Kolczyk and Ziegenhals, who fight with all means available. Kolczyk, learning that Ziegenhals thinks that Kolczyk wants to kill him, starts playing with Ziegenhals' mind. For example, he sends him a package with an alarm clock, making Ziegenhals think that he has received a mail bomb. Ziegenhals meanwhile befriends Kolczyk's daughter Ginny (Kristina Nel) and makes her his lover. Although this forces them both to have to pretend in public that they are friends, the final disaster cannot be averted.

== Cast ==
- Klaus Schwarzkopf as Professor Rüdiger Kolczyk
- Jürgen Prochnow as Bernd Ziegenhals
- Elke Sommer as Miezi
- Ulla Jacobsson as Reinhild Kolczyk
- Kristina Nel as Ginny Kolczyk
- Anita Kupsch as Sekretary Beate Blau
- Walter Gross as Grandfather Melzer
- Fritz Tillmann as Dr Sievers
- Berta Drews as Mother Braats
- Claus Theo Gärtner as Kalle Prötzel

== Production and distribution ==
One or the Other of Us was Petersen's first theatrical feature film. Petersen had already directed several high-profile films for television, including four episodes for the Tatort television series. Klaus Schwarzkopf and Jürgen Prochnow had already played in some of Petersen's Tatort productions. The script was based on the novel of the same name written by Horst Bosetzky, a professor of sociology. At this time the identity of Horst Bosetzky was unknown as due to his position as a professor he published under the pseudonym -ky. One or the Other of Us was shot in October and November 1973 in Berlin and Sylt. The film was shot in Eastmancolor on 35 mm in a 1.66:1 aspect ratio.

The film made its theatrical debut on 22 February 1974 at the Gloria-Palast in Berlin. It was first aired on television on 12 February 1982 on ZDF. The film was released on VHS in 1998 and on DVD in 2008 in Germany.

== Awards and honors ==
One or the Other of Us won two Bundesfilmpreise in 1974:

- Filmband in Gold for Best New Director (Wolfgang Petersen)
- Filmband in Gold for Best Cinematography (Charly Steinberger)

It was also chosen as West Germany's official submission to the 47th Academy Awards for Best Foreign Language Film, but did not manage to receive a nomination.

== See also ==
- List of submissions to the 47th Academy Awards for Best Foreign Language Film
- List of German submissions for the Academy Award for Best Foreign Language Film

== Bibliography ==
- -ky (April 2008). Einer von uns Beiden (in German). Edition Köln. ISBN 978-3-936791-48-8.
