= Herbert Fleischmann =

German actor (1925–1984)

- Born: 13 March 1925; Nuremberg, Bavaria, Germany
- Died: 5 April 1984 (aged 59); Cavigliano, Ticino, Switzerland
- Occupation: Actor
- Years active: 1955–1984 (film & TV)

Herbert Fleischmann (1925–1984) was a German film and television actor. He was married several times including to the actress Ruth Leuwerik.

== Partial filmography ==
- Barbara (1961) as Gabriel
- Durchbruch Lok 234 (1963) as Dr. Konetzki
- Der Kardinal von Spanien (1965) as Herzog von Estival
- The Investigation (1966, TV film) as Prosecuting Attorney
- Kopfstand, Madam! (1967) as Robert Hendrich
- The Girl from Rio (1969) as Carl
- Hate Is My God (1969) as Alex Carter
- Maximilian von Mexiko (1970, TV Series) as Sir Charles Wyke
- Hauser's Memory (1970, TV Movie) as Werner Renner
- The Bordello (1971) as Leopold Grün
- Und Jimmy ging zum Regenbogen (1971) as Jean Mercier
- Captain Typhoon (1971) as Nico
- Love Is Only a Word (1971) as Manfred Angenfort
- Der Kommissar (1971-1975, TV Series) as Dr. Schneider / Alwin Schenk / Willi Kaiser
- The Stuff That Dreams Are Made Of (1972) as Bertie Engelhardt
- Sonderdezernat K1 (1972, TV Series) as Dr. Robert Steenkamp
- All People Will Be Brothers (1973) as Police Inspector Eilers
- ...aber Jonny! (1973) as Frantzen
- Zinksärge für die Goldjungen (1973) as Otto Westermann
- Three Men in the Snow (1974) as Zenkel
- Only the Wind Knows the Answer (1974) as Gustav Brandenburg
- Derrick (1974-1984, TV Series) as Dr. Wolfgang Rohm / Professor Joachim von Haidersfeld Alfred Answald / Mahler / Ernst Windorf / Herr Ludemann / Broll (final appearance)
- Crime After School (1975) as Alexander Gregor
- Lobster (1976, TV Mini-Series) as Rolf Klein
- Es muss nicht immer Kaviar sein (1977, TV Series) as Major Loos
- Die Kette (1977, TV Mini-Series) as Chief Inspector Hal Yardley
- Tatort (1978, TV Series) as Peter Huck, ihr Mann
- Die Protokolle des Herrn M. (1979, TV Series) as Walter Mannhardt
- Der Fuchs von Övelgönne (1981, TV Series) as Herbert Niessen
- The Old Fox: Tote Lumpen jagt man nicht (1982, TV Series) as Bodo Lammers

== Bibliography ==
- Goble, Alan. The Complete Index to Literary Sources in Film. Walter de Gruyter, 1999.
