= Heinz Bennent =

German actor (1921–2011)

- Born: 18 July 1921; Stolberg, Rhineland, Germany
- Died: 12 October 2011 (aged 90); Lausanne, Switzerland
- Occupation: Actor

Heinz Bennent (18 July 1921 – 12 October 2011) was a German actor.

== Biography ==
Bennent was born in Stolberg. He was conscripted into the Luftwaffe during World War II, where he was captured by Allied forces and spent much of the war in POW camps. His career began after the war in Göttingen. He moved to Switzerland in the 1970s, where he lived until his death at age 90. He was survived by his son, actor David Bennent, and daughter, actress Anne Bennent.

== Selected filmography ==
=== Film ===
- 1959: A Doctor of Conviction .... Walter Wichert
- 1960: Madame Pompadour .... Dichter Joseph Calicot
- 1967: Kopfstand, Madam! .... Ulrich
- 1972: Les rendez-vous en forêt .... Akos
- 1974: Perahim - die zweite Chance
- 1975: Section spéciale .... Major Beumelburg
- 1975: Ice Age .... Pastor Holm
- 1975: The Lost Honour of Katharina Blum .... Dr. Hubert Blorna
- 1975: The Net .... Inspector Canonica
- 1976: Une femme fatale .... Moritz Korber
- 1976: Néa .... Philip Ashby
- 1976: I Want to Live .... Professor Wolfgang Mach
- 1976: Die Wildente .... Doctor Relling
- 1977: The Serpent's Egg .... Professor Hans Vergerus
- 1978: Germany in Autumn .... Member of the board of TV producers
- 1978: The Man in the Rushes .... Felix
- 1978: Brass Target .... Kasten
- 1979: Son of Hitler .... Ostermayer
- 1979: The Tin Drum .... Greff
- 1979: Womanlight .... Georges
- 1979: Sisters, or the Balance of Happiness .... Münzinger
- 1980: Lulu .... Dr. Schön
- 1980: The Last Metro .... Lucas Steiner
- 1981: Possession .... Heinrich
- 1982: L'amour des femmes .... Manfred
- 1982: Le Lit .... Martin
- 1982: Espion, lève-toi .... Meyer
- 1982: War and Peace .... Joe
- 1983: Via degli specchi .... Gianfranco
- 1983: Sarah .... Pierre Baranne
- 1983: The Death of Mario Ricci .... Henri Kremer
- 1985: Le Transfuge .... Heinz Steger
- 1988: Year of the Turtle .... Heinz August Kamp
- 1991: Plaisir d'amour .... Raphaël
- 1993: Je m'appelle Victor
- 1994: Elles ne pensent qu'à ça... .... Léon
- 1995: A French Woman .... Andreas
- 1995: Tears of Stone .... Herr Richtof
- 1999: Jonas et Lila, à demain .... Anziano
- 2000: Cold Is the Evening Breeze .... Hugo Wimmer

=== Television ===
- 1969: Exklusiv! (TV film) .... Edmund Frank
- 1969: The Age of the Fish (TV film) .... Mr. Lorenz, teacher
- 1970: Eine Rose für Jane (TV film) .... Jones
- 1971: Tatort: AE612 ohne Landeerlaubnis (TV series episode) .... Pilot Feininger
- 1972: Der Kommissar: Tod eines Schulmädchens (TV series episode) .... Dr. Gebhardt
- 1972: Les Rendez-vous en forêt (TV film) .... Akos
- 1972: Sonderdezernat K1: Vier Schüsse auf den Mörder (TV series episode) .... Jeffrey Simmons
- 1973: Der Kommissar: Der Geigenspieler (TV series episode) .... Andreas Kolding
- 1974: Perahim – die zweite Chance (TV film) .... Perahim
- 1974: Die Eltern (TV film) .... Michael
- 1975: Metamorphosis (TV film) .... Gregor Samsa's father
- 1975: Derrick: Paddenberg (TV series episode) .... Robert Hofer
- 1975: Tatort: Wodka Bitter-Lemon (TV series episode) .... Martin Koenen
- 1976: Lobster: Der Einarmige (TV series episode) .... Franz Borsig
- 1976: Tatort: Zwei Leben (TV series episode) .... Franz Scheller
- 1976: Der Anwalt (TV series, 13 episodes) .... Dr. Wetzlar
- 1978: Derrick: Lissas Vater (TV series episode) .... Ludwig Heimer
- 1980: From the Life of the Marionettes (TV film) .... Arthur Brenner
- 1981: Der Fall Maurizius (TV miniseries) .... Wolf von Andergast
- 1982: Derrick: Nachts in einem fremden Haus (TV series episode) .... Dr. Stoll
- 1983: Derrick: Geheimnisse einer Nacht (TV series episode) .... Gustav Vrings
- 1985: Derrick: Die Tänzerin (TV series episode) .... Dr. Rohner
- 1986: Le Tiroir secret (TV miniseries) .... André Lemarchand
- 1987: Gambit (TV film) .... Feuerbach
- 1994: Maigret et le Fantôme (TV series episode) .... Gustav Jonker
- 2004: Princesse Marie (TV film) .... Sigmund Freud (final film role)

== Awards ==
In 1980, Bennent was nominated for the César Award for Best Supporting Actor for his role in The Last Metro.
