= Erika Pluhar =

Austrian actress and author (born 1939)

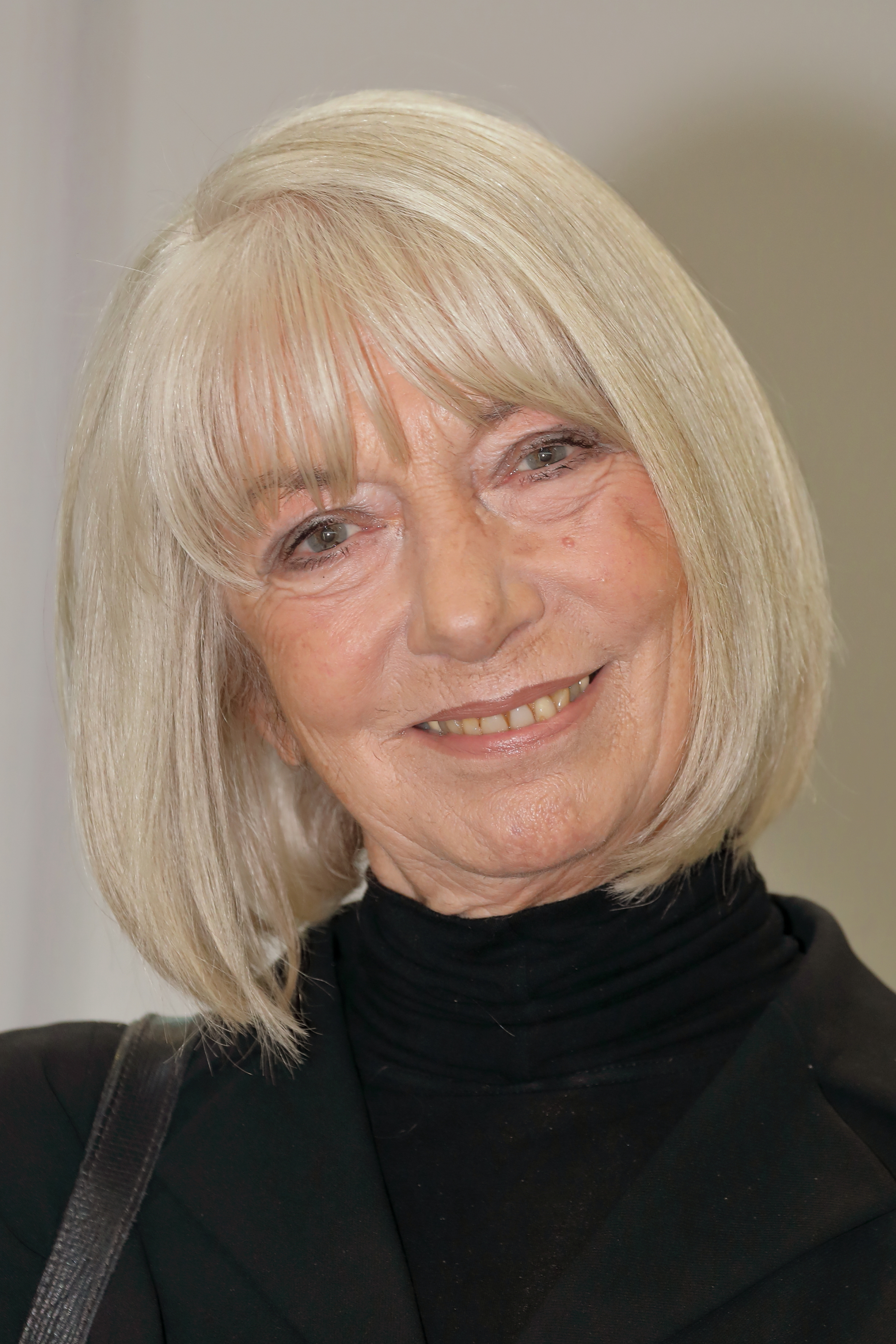
- Born: Erika Pluhar; 28 February 1939 (age 87); Vienna, Austria
- Website: www.erikapluhar.net

Erika Pluhar is an Austrian actress, singer, and author, born on 28 February 1939 in Vienna. She is the daughter of Anna and Dr Josef Pluhar. Pluhar's younger sister, Ingeborg G. Pluhar, is a painter and sculptor. Erika Pluhar is not related to Austrian musician Christina Pluhar.

After finishing school in 1957 Pluhar studied at Max Reinhardt Seminar, the Viennese academy for music and the performing arts, graduating with distinction in 1959. She immediately went into acting at Burgtheater, the former imperial court theatre. She was a member of the Burgtheater acting troupe for forty years, until 1999.

At the beginning of the 1970s Erika Pluhar embarked on a singing and songwriting career. In 1981 the diarist's first book length publication appeared. (The list below is incomplete.)

Erika Pluhar was married twice (to Udo Proksch, a businessman who was convicted of the murder of six people, and to André Heller, Austrian poet and all-rounder artist). She had a daughter, Anna (1961–1999), who died from asthma.

== Literary works (German) ==
- Aus Tagebüchern (1981)
- Über Leben : Lieder und ihre Geschichten (1982)
- Lieder (1986)
- Als gehörte eins zum anderen : eine Geschichte (1991)
- Zwischen die Horizonte geschrieben : Lieder, Lyrik, kleine Prosa (1992)
- Marisa : Rückblenden auf eine Freundschaft (1996), Hoffmann und Campe, ISBN 978-3-455-30105-2
- Am Ende des Gartens : Erinnerungen an eine Jugend (1997)
- Matildas Erfindungen (1999)
- Der Fisch lernt fliegen : unterwegs durch die Jahre (2000)
- Verzeihen Sie, ist das hier schon die Endstation? (2001)
- Die Wahl (2003)
- Erika Pluhar: Ein Bilderbuch (2004)
- Die stille Zeit : Geschichten und Gedanken nicht nur zu Weihnachten (2004)
- Reich der Verluste (2005)
- Paar Weise. Geschichten und Betrachtungen zur Zweisamkeit, (Januar 2007), Residenz/Niederösterreichisches Pressehaus, ISBN 3-7017-1472-X, ISBN 978-3-7017-1472-8
- Spätes Tagebuch. Roman (novel 2010, 9th ed. 2019), audiobook in German (2011), 4th paperback ed. 2023.
- Gitti (2023), the story of Brigitte King, Pluhar's elder sister.

== Records ==
- Erika Pluhar singt (1972)
- So oder so ist das Leben (1974)
- Die Liebeslieder der Erika Pluhar (1975)
- Hier bin ich (1976)
- Beziehungen (1978)
- Vom Himmel auf die Erde falln sich die Engel tot: Pluhar singt Biermann (1979)
- Narben (1981)
- Über Leben (1982)
- Liebende (1983)
- Wiener Lieder
- Bossa à la Marinoff (1989)
- For ever
- Ein Abend am Naschmarkt (1995)
- Jahraus, jahrein (1998)
- I geb net auf (1999)
- Lieder vom Himmel und der Erde (2002)
- Es war einmal (2004)
- Wien. Lied. Wir. (2006)

== Film appearances ==
- 1961: Die Türen knallen (TV film)
- 1963: The Seagull (TV film)
- 1964: Das vierte Gebot (TV film)
- 1968: Bel Ami (TV film)
- 1968: Moss on the Stones, directed by Georg Lhotzky
- 1968: Die Bürger von Calais (TV film)
- 1969: Bonaventure (TV film)
- 1969: Traumnovelle (TV film)
- 1970: Hier bin ich, mein Vater (TV film)
- 1970: Perrak, directed by Alfred Vohrer
- 1970: Photo Finish (TV film)
- 1971: The Goalkeeper's Fear of the Penalty, directed by Wim Wenders – based on a story by Peter Handke
- 1971: Intermezzo (TV film)
- 1971: The Night in Lisbon (TV film)
- 1972: Monsieur chasse! (TV film)
- 1973: Der Zuschlag (TV film)
- 1973: Merry-Go-Round
- 1974: Der Schwierige (TV film)
- 1975: Der Strick um den Hals (TV miniseries)
- 1976: The Brothers, directed by Wolf Gremm
- 1977: Gaslight (TV film)
- 1977: Death or Freedom, directed by Wolf Gremm
- 1977: Just a Gigolo, directed by David Hemmings
- 1978: The Lady of the Camellias (TV film)
- 1978: The Man in the Rushes, directed by Manfred Purzer
- 1980: Sunday Children, directed by Michael Verhoeven
- 1983: Love Is Not an Argument, directed by Marianne Lüdcke
- 1986: Mamortische, directed by Antonio Victor D’Almeida
- 1992: Rosalinas Haus
- 1994: Etwas am Herzen
- 1994: Mrs. Klein (TV film), directed by Ingemo Engström
- 1994: Rosen aus Jerichow, directed by Hans Peter Heinzl
- 2001: Marafona: ein Film über das Lieben, directed by Erika Pluhar
- 2010: The End Is My Beginning

== Awards ==
- The Josef Kainz Medal from the City of Vienna (1979)
- The Robert Musil Medal from the city of Klagenfurt and the Robert Musil Archive (1984)
- Chamber Actress of the Year (1986)
- Honorary Medal of the City of Vienna, Gold (2000)
