= The Man in the Rushes =

- Directed by: Manfred Purzer
- Written by: George Saiko (novel); Manfred Purzer
- Produced by: Luggi Waldleitner
- Starring: Jean Sorel; Erika Pluhar; Nathalie Delon
- Cinematography: Charly Steinberger
- Edited by: Peter Przygodda
- Music by: Erich Ferstl
- Production companies: Bayerischer Rundfunk; Roxy Film
- Distributed by: Constantin Film
- Release date: 30 October 1978
- Running time: 113 minutes
- Country: West Germany
- Language: German

The Man in the Rushes (German: Der Mann im Schilf) is a 1978 West German thriller film directed by Manfred Purzer and starring Jean Sorel, Erika Pluhar and Nathalie Delon.

The film's sets were designed by the art director Peter Rothe.

== Cast ==
- Jean Sorel as Robert
- Erika Pluhar as Hannah
- Nathalie Delon as Loraine
- Bernhard Wicki as Sir Gerald
- Heinrich Schweiger as Mostbaumer
- Kurt Weinzierl as Schemnitzky
- Karl Renar as Sedlak
- Heinz Bennent as Felix
- Tilo Prückner as Landstreicher
- Rudolf Schündler as Pfarrer
- Franz Gary as Florian

== Bibliography ==
- Bock, Hans-Michael & Bergfelder, Tim. The Concise Cinegraph: Encyclopaedia of German Cinema. Berghahn Books, 2009.
