= Charly Steinberger =

Austrian cinematographer (1937–2019)

- Born: 3 November 1937; Schalchen, Austria
- Died: 27 March 2019 (aged 81)
- Occupation: Cinematographer
- Years active: 1962-2008 (film & TV)

Charly Steinberger (1937–2019) was an Austrian cinematographer. He also directed one film, the 1975 comedy Monika and the Sixteen Year Olds. He was married to the actress Susanne Uhlen.

== Selected filmography ==
- A Woman Needs Loving (1969)
- Deep End (1970)
- Love Is Only a Word (1971)
- Und Jimmy ging zum Regenbogen (1971)
- The Stuff That Dreams Are Made Of (1972)
- King, Queen, Knave (1972)
- All People Will Be Brothers (1973)
- One or the Other of Us (1974)
- Three Men in the Snow (1974)
- Monika and the Sixteen Year Olds (1975)
- To the Bitter End (1975)
- The Net (1975)
- Crime After School (1975)
- Rosemary's Daughter (1976)
- Women in Hospital (1977)
- Just a Gigolo (1978)
- The Man in the Rushes (1978)
- The Lightship (1985)
- Fire, Ice and Dynamite (1990)

== Bibliography ==
- Terri Ginsberg & Andrea Mensch. A Companion to German Cinema. John Wiley & Sons, 2012.
