= Monika and the Sixteen Year Olds =

- Directed by: Charly Steinberger
- Written by: Willibald Eser; August Rieger
- Starring: Teri Tordai; Liselotte Pulver; Klausjürgen Wussow
- Cinematography: Charly Steinberger
- Edited by: Gabi Sulzer
- Production company: Film-Cine Produktions
- Release date: 20 June 1975
- Running time: 79 minutes
- Country: West Germany
- Language: German

Monika and the Sixteen Year Olds (German: Monika und die Sechzehnjährigen) is a 1975 West German sex comedy film directed by Charly Steinberger and featuring Teri Tordai, Liselotte Pulver and Klausjürgen Wussow.

== Synopsis ==
A group of teenage girls at a boarding school all fall in love with the son of the director, but are alarmed when they discover he has plans to become a priest and renounce women entirely.

== Cast ==
- Marie Zürer as Monika
- Oliver Collignon as Johannes
- Liselotte Pulver as Annelie, die Frau Direktorin
- Klausjürgen Wussow as Monsignore Victor Berend
- Judith Moser as Bettina
- Silke Klose as Sylvie
- Carina Kreisch as Uschi
- Teri Tordai as Mutter
- Hilde Banser as Fanny

== Bibliography ==
- Terri Ginsberg & Andrea Mensch. A Companion to German Cinema. John Wiley & Sons, 2012.
