= Just a Gigolo (1978 film) =

- Theatrical release poster
- German: Schöner Gigolo, armer Gigolo
- Directed by: David Hemmings
- Written by: Ennio De Concini; Joshua Sinclair
- Produced by: Rolf Thiele
- Starring: David Bowie; Sydne Rome; Kim Novak; David Hemmings; Maria Schell; Curd Jürgens; Marlene Dietrich
- Cinematography: Charly Steinberger
- Edited by: Susi Jäger
- Music by: John Altman; Günther Fischer
- Distributed by: Warner-Columbia Filmverleih
- Release date: 16 November 1978 (West Germany)
- Running time: 147 minutes (original cut); 105 minutes (international cut)
- Country: West Germany
- Languages: English; German

Just a Gigolo (German: Schöner Gigolo, armer Gigolo, lit. 'Beautiful Gigolo, Poor Gigolo') is a 1978 West German drama film directed by David Hemmings and starring David Bowie. Set in post-World War I Berlin, it also features Sydne Rome, Kim Novak and Marlene Dietrich in her final film role.

The film was panned by critics and audiences; this led Bowie to quip that it was "my 32 Elvis Presley movies rolled into one".

== Plot ==
A Prussian officer returns home to Berlin following the end of the Great War. Unable to find employment elsewhere, he works as a gigolo in a brothel run by the Baroness. He is eventually killed in street fighting between Nazis and Communists. Both sides claim his body but the Nazis succeed in capturing it and bury him with honours, "a hero to a cause he did not support".

== Cast ==
- David Bowie as Paul Ambrosius von Przygodski
- Sydne Rome as Cilly
- Kim Novak as Helga von Kaiserling
- David Hemmings as Captain Hermann Kraft
- Maria Schell as Frau von Przygodski
- Curd Jürgens as Prince
- Marlene Dietrich as Baroness von Semering
- Erika Pluhar as Eva
- Hilde Weissner as Aunt Hilda
- Werner Pochath as Otto
- Rudolf Schündler as Oberst Gustav von Przygodski
- Evelyn Künneke as Frau Aeckerle

== Production ==
Around the time of its release, David Hemmings said that Just a Gigolo was intended to be "highly ironic, tongue-in-cheek, about the period". Marlene Dietrich was persuaded to come out of retirement to make the film, reportedly receiving $250,000 for two days' shooting.

It was Bowie's first movie role after Nicolas Roeg's The Man Who Fell to Earth (1976). As Roeg's film had played upon Bowie's earlier identification with science fiction and alienness, so Just a Gigolo fitted his interest in pre-war Berlin, pricked by meeting Christopher Isherwood, whose Goodbye to Berlin had inspired the musical Cabaret. The city and its music scene inspired Bowie's Berlin Trilogy, and had been the recording location for Bowie's studio album, "Heroes" (1977).

The singer has variously claimed that he took the role "as a favour to Hemmings", who at the time was also planning to produce a documentary of Bowie's 1978 concert tour, and because "Marlene Dietrich was dangled in front of me". The two stars never met, Dietrich played her brief part in Paris, where she lived, with the result simply being cut into Bowie's scenes that were shot, along with the rest of the film, in Berlin.

== Soundtrack ==
The soundtrack of Just a Gigolo included jazz and cabaret standards performed by various acts including Pasadena Roof Orchestra, The Manhattan Transfer and the Village People. As well as appearing on screen, Sydne Rome sang a track called "Don't Let It Be Too Long", by David Hemmings and composer Günther Fischer, while Marlene Dietrich performed the song "Just a Gigolo".

Unlike his work on The Man Who Fell to Earth, Bowie did contribute a piece of music to the film; "Revolutionary Song" was co-written with musical director Jack Fishman and played by a band called the Rebels. It was released in Japan as a single, which later became something of a collector's item.

== Release and aftermath ==
The film opened in Berlin on 16 November 1978. It received poor reviews and was pulled from cinemas. Hemmings recut the picture for its UK premiere in Prince Charles Cinema on 14 February 1979 where, at an ostensibly black-tie affair, Bowie wore a kimono. Reviews were again negative; the Sunday Mirror called the film "all show and no substance" and considered Bowie "completely miscast", while Time Out advised its readers to simply "overlook it".

In an interview with NME in September 1980, Bowie was quoted as saying:

Everybody who was involved in that film – when they meet each other now, they look away [covers face with hands, laughs]... Listen, you were disappointed, and you weren't even in it. Imagine how we felt... It was my 32 Elvis Presley movies rolled into one.

Bowie's biographers have labelled the film "an active pain", "an unadulterated flop", and a "debacle". Its reputation among mainstream critics generally remains low, Halliwell's calling it an "international misadventure... interminable... clumsily made", while Leonard Maltin describes it as a "weird melodrama". Allmovie's Hal Erickson has nevertheless given the film a 3-star rating.

Just a Gigolo was released to DVD in a number of markets in 2004. It was digitally remastered and received its first official release in the United Kingdom in 2021, where it was accompanied by a 54-page booklet on the making of the film.
