= The Net (1975 film) =

1975 film

- Film poster
- Directed by: Manfred Purzer
- Written by: Hans Habe; Manfred Purzer
- Produced by: Luggi Waldleitner
- Starring: Mel Ferrer; Elke Sommer; Klaus Kinski; Heinz Bennent
- Cinematography: Charly Steinberger
- Edited by: Corinna Dietz; Ingeborg Taschner
- Music by: Klaus Doldinger
- Release date: 25 December 1975
- Running time: 90 minutes
- Country: West Germany
- Language: German

The Net (German: Das Netz) is a 1975 West German drama film directed by Manfred Purzer and starring Mel Ferrer. It is based on the novel The Poisoned Stream by Hans Habe.

== Cast ==
- Mel Ferrer as Aurelio Morelli
- Elke Sommer as Christa Sonntag
- Klaus Kinski as Emilio Bossi
- Heinz Bennent as Police Inspector Canonica
- Susanne Uhlen as Agnese
- Sonja Jeannine as Vera Pisenti
- Franz Rudnick as Police Detective
- Andrea Rau as Herta Enzian
- Claudio Gora as Carlo Vanetti
- Carlo De Mejo as Francesco Vanetti
- Giovannella Grifeo as Lucia
- Willi Rose as Whitaker
- Sabine von Maydell as Librarian
- Maria D'Incoronato as Girl at party
