= Auch ich war nur ein mittelmäßiger Schüler =

- Directed by: Werner Jacobs
- Written by: Alexander Spoerl (novel); Georg Althammer
- Produced by: Heinz Willeg
- Starring: Detlev Eckstein; Bernd Herberger; Jutta Speidel; Christiane Krüger
- Cinematography: Ernst Wild
- Edited by: Carl Otto Bartning
- Music by: Raimund Rosenberger
- Release date: 25 October 1974
- Running time: 94 minutes
- Country: West Germany
- Language: German

Auch ich war nur ein mittelmäßiger Schüler is a 1974 West German comedy film directed by Werner Jacobs and starring Detlev Eckstein, Bernd Herberger and Jutta Speidel.

== Synopsis ==
While waiting for their wives to give birth, two men reminisce about their school days.

== Cast ==
- Detlev Eckstein as Peter 'Pitt' Ahrens
- Bernd Herberger as Felix Kempmann
- Jutta Speidel as Julia
- Christiane Krüger as Fräulein Steiner
- Kristina Nel as Astrid
- Horst Tappert as Dr. Siegfried Elsenbeck
- Georg Thomalla as Prof. Dr. Fabian
- Rudolf Platte as Mr. Dengel
- Gerlinde Locker as Frau Ahrens
- Claus Biederstaedt as Wolfgang Ahrens
- Konrad Georg as Krüger
- Margot Trooger as Fräulein Landgraf
- Günter Mack as Dr. Krummbach
- Wolfgang Spier as Wiesling
- Walter Gross as Oskar Kunzfeld
- Harald Juhnke as Arzt
- Inge Marschall as Krankenschwester
