= Erwin Gitt =

German film producer and production manager

- Born: 17 February 1910; Berlin, German Empire
- Died: 12 August 1975 (aged 65); Munich, West Germany
- Occupation: Producer
- Years active: 1948-1975 (film)

Erwin Gitt (1910 – 1975) was a German film producer and production manager. He worked for many years at Rialto Film where he was involved with the Edgar Wallace and Karl May adaptations produced by the studio during the 1960s.

== Selected filmography ==
=== Production manager ===
- Film Without a Title (1948)
- Sensation in Savoy (1950)
- One Night's Intoxication (1951)
- A Thousand Red Roses Bloom (1952)
- Until We Meet Again (1952)
- The Chaplain of San Lorenzo (1953)
- Street Serenade (1953)
- Guitars of Love (1954)
- Old Surehand (1965)

=== Producer ===
- I and You (1953)
- A Woman of Today (1954)
- Santa Lucia (1956)
- Nick Knatterton’s Adventure (1959)
- Last of the Renegades (1964)
- Room 13 (1964)
- Ramona (1961)
- Winnetou and Old Firehand (1966)
- Winnetou and the Crossbreed (1966)
- The Duck Rings at Half Past Seven (1968)
- The Hound of Blackwood Castle (1968)
- Perrak (1970)
- Love Is Only a Word (1971)
- All People Will Be Brothers (1973)

== Bibliography ==
- Peter Cowie & Derek Elley. World Filmography: 1967. Fairleigh Dickinson University Press, 1977.
