= Anita Lochner =

German film and television actress (born 1950)

- Born: 24 April 1950 (age 76); Frankfurt am Main, West Germany
- Occupation: Actress
- Years active: 1970–present (film)

Anita Lochner (born 24 April 1950) is a German film and television actress.

== Selected filmography ==
- Deep End (1970)
- Tears of Blood (1972)
- The Moonstone (1974, TV film)
- Baker's Bread (1976)
- Die Dämonen (1977, TV miniseries)
- The Black Forest Clinic (1987–1988, TV series, 4 episodes)
- Der Landarzt (1992, TV series, 4 episodes)

== Bibliography ==
- Goble, Alan. The Complete Index to Literary Sources in Film. Walter de Gruyter, 1999.
