= The Sex Nest =

1970 film by Alfred Vohrer

- Directed by: Alfred Vohrer
- Screenplay by: Manfred Purzer; Alfred Vohrer
- Produced by: Luggi Waldleitner
- Starring: Siegfried Schürenberg; Eddi Arent; Tilly Lauenstein; Mascha Gonska; Gernot Endemann; Ann Smyrner; Judy Winter
- Cinematography: Ernst W. Kalinke
- Edited by: Susanne Paschen
- Music by: Rolf Kühn
- Production company: Roxy Film
- Release date: February 27, 1970 (West Germany)
- Running time: 94 minutes
- Country: West Germany

The Sex Nest (German: Das gelbe Haus am Pinnasberg) is a 1970 West German sex comedy directed by Alfred Vohrer. The film is about a brothel for neglected wives that is predominantly staffed by men. It is based on the novel by Bengta Bischoff.

== Plot summary ==
The so-called yellow house Pinnasberg is a Hamburg brothel for women, which is led by authoritarian "General" Werner Zibell, supported by its busy night porter. When one of his guys dies, he is replaced by sociology student Stefan Bornemann, who intends to do practical studies here.

Here, Stefan falls in love with Luise Zibell, the daughter of the brothel owner. Meanwhile, anger is finally appeased by his wife Clarissa. She persuades him to accept Stefan as a son and set the yellow house for sale. This is done just in time, because work on a subway tunnel leads to the collapse of the house shortly after.

== Release ==
The Sex Nest was released in West Germany on February 27, 1970. The film also had the alternative German title Eine Wohltat fur alle Frauen: Das gelbe Haus am Pinnasberg.

== Reception ==
In a contemporary review, the Monthly Film Bulletin noted the acting and direction in the film were "of a much higher standard than in most German sex fare" but noted that the film's humour was still "terribly heavy-handed and the film's two 'serious' sub-plots...are never successfully integrated into the comic narrative."

== See also ==
- List of German films of the 1970s
