= Tears of Blood =

1972 film

- Film poster
- Directed by: Alfred Vohrer
- Written by: Michel Gast; Manfred Purzer
- Based on: The Blizzard by Alexander Pushkin
- Produced by: Luggi Waldleitner
- Starring: Alain Noury
- Cinematography: Jerzy Lipman
- Release date: 16 November 1972
- Running time: 94 minutes
- Countries: West Germany; France
- Language: German

Tears of Blood (German: Und der Regen verwischt jede Spur) is a 1972 West German-French drama film directed by Alfred Vohrer. It was entered into the 8th Moscow International Film Festival.

== Cast ==
- Alain Noury as Alain
- Anita Lochner as Christine
- Wolfgang Reichmann as Luba
- Malte Thorsten as Martin
- Eva Christian as Karin
- Ruth Maria Kubitschek as Irene
- Konrad Georg
- Henry Vahl as Brodersen
- Alf Marholm as Vater Täumer
