= Jutta Hering =

German film editor (1924–2011)

- Born: 18 April 1924; Berlin, Germany
- Died: 31 December 2011 (aged 87); Munich, Bavaria, Germany
- Occupation: Film editor

Jutta Hering (later Kaffer, 18 April 1924 – 31 December 2011) was a German film editor.

Hering was born in Berlin in April 1924. She died in Munich in December 2011, at the age of 87.

== Selected filmography ==
- The Sinful Village (1954)
- The Double Husband (1955)
- Bonjour Kathrin (1956)
- My Aunt, Your Aunt (1956)
- The Simple Girl (1957)
- Munchhausen in Africa (1958)
- Moonwolf (1959)
- La Paloma (1959)
- Old Heidelberg (1959)
- Adieu, Lebewohl, Goodbye (1961)
- Ramona (1961)
- Axel Munthe, The Doctor of San Michele (1962)
- Room 13 (1964)
- Long Legs, Long Fingers (1966)
- Winnetou and the Crossbreed (1966)
- Winnetou and Old Firehand (1966)
- The College Girl Murders (1967)
- The Hound of Blackwood Castle (1968)
- The Gorilla of Soho (1968)
- The Man with the Glass Eye (1969)
- Dr. Fabian: Laughing Is the Best Medicine (1969)
- Perrak (1970)
- Und Jimmy ging zum Regenbogen (1971)
- Love Is Only a Word (1971)
- Everyone Dies Alone (1976)

== Bibliography ==
- Vermilye, Jerry. Ingmar Bergman: His Life and Films. McFarland, 2006.
