= Rosemary (1958 film) =

1958 film

- Directed by: Rolf Thiele
- Written by: Jo Herbst; Erich Kuby; Rolf Ulrich; Rolf Thiele
- Produced by: Luggi Waldleitner
- Starring: Nadja Tiller; Peter van Eyck; Carl Raddatz
- Cinematography: Rolf von Rautenfeld
- Edited by: Elisabeth Kleinert-Neumann
- Music by: Norbert Schultze
- Production company: Roxy Film
- Distributed by: Neue Filmverleih
- Release date: 28 June 1958
- Running time: 105 minutes
- Country: West Germany
- Language: German
- Box office: $1.25 million

Rosemary (German: Das Mädchen Rosemarie, lit. 'The Girl Rosemarie') is a 1958 West German drama film directed by Rolf Thiele and starring Nadja Tiller, Peter van Eyck, and Carl Raddatz. The film portrays the scandal that surrounded Rosemarie Nitribitt. Thiele made a second film about Nitribitt, Rosemary's Daughter, which was released in 1976. The film was a joint winner of the Golden Globe Award for Best Foreign Language Film.

== Plot ==
A basement in Frankfurt is shared by two petty criminals, Horst and Walter. They recruit Rosemarie, a pretty but penniless blonde, to be the bait for their day job as street musicians.

When she enters the lobby of a smart hotel, hoping to pick up a businessman, she is kicked out by the concierge. She does however catch the eye of a group of businessmen who meet in the hotel and one of them, the married Hartog, sets her up in an apartment.

While Hartog is away at an exclusive equestrian event, Rosemarie picks up Fribert, a wealthy Frenchman who, to the horror of Hartog and his family, brings the uninvited Rosemarie to the event. Hartog gives Rosemarie a cash pay-off, which she immediately splurges on a convertible.

Fribert takes her over, not for sex but to improve her image by ditching her cheap clothes and décor. His plan, when he unveils it, is to use her for industrial espionage. He wires her apartment, after which she has to get businessmen into her bed and get them talking.

The plan works well, except that he is slow to collect the tapes and Rosemarie realises that she can use them herself. She also hankers, after being kicked out of Hartog's horse event, to be recognised among the rich instead of just sleeping with the husbands for cash.

She causes another scandal by turning up uninvited at a party attended by most of her clients and their wives, two of which are enticed by the promise of a cash payout to plunge fully clothed into the pool and swim as the other guests crowd around. Fribert realises she is becoming a liability, as do her clients. One night when the gentlemen are all enjoying themselves in a night club with the resident whores, she turns up drunk. Left to take herself home alone, she staggers back to the assassin waiting in her flat.

== Cast ==
- Nadja Tiller as Rosemarie
- Peter van Eyck as Fribert
- Carl Raddatz as Hartog
- Gert Fröbe as Bruster
- Hanne Wieder as Marga
- Mario Adorf as Horst
- Jo Herbst as Walter
- Werner Peters as Nakonski
- Karin Baal as Do
- Horst Frank as Student Michael Runge
- Erik von Loewis as von Killenschiff
- Arno Paulsen as Schmidt
- Tilo von Berlepsch as Oelsen
- Hubert von Meyerinck as Kleye
- Helen Vita as Eveline
- Ruth Hausmeister as Frau Hartog

== Production ==
It was shot at the Spandau Studios and on location in Frankfurt and Munich. The film's sets were designed by the art directors Wolf Englert and Ernst Richter.

== Reception ==
Variety said it "stirred up the best cinema biz of any German film in this country, coining plenty for its distributor", making over $1.25 million.

It was hoped the film would be a success in US art houses along the lines of French and Italian movies but after some popular initial screenings in New York the North American earnings were only $175,000.

== Bibliography ==
- Bock, Hans-Michael; Bergfelder, Tim, eds. (2009). The Concise Cinegraph: Encyclopaedia of German Cinema. New York: Berghahn Books. ISBN 978-1-57181-655-9.
