= Schloß Pompon Rouge =

- Starring: Elisabeth Volkmann
- Music by: Grzegorz Ciechowski
- Country of origin: Germany

Production
- Running time: 25 minutes

Original release
- Network: RTL Plus
- Release: 15 September 1991

Schloß Pompon Rouge is a 1991 German period erotic comedy television series starring Elisabeth Volkmann. 22 episodes were broadcast on the German private broadcaster RTL Plus from September 1991 to May 1992. The soundtrack to the series was composed by Grzegorz Ciechowski.

== Plot ==
The series is set in Germany in the eighteenth century. The small, insignificant principality of Bommelroth is ruled by Marquis Henri (actually Heinrich) Bommelroth. He and his wife, the Marquise Marie-Antoinette (actually Maria) overindulge themselves in the courtly customs of Versailles.

== Cast ==
- Elisabeth Volkmann as Marquise Marie Antoinette de Pompon Rouge
- Jörg Bräuer as Marquis Henri de Pompon Rouge
- Franz H. Hanfstingl as Friedrich von Stolzenfels
- Imo Heite as Abbé
- Stephan Meyer-Kohlhoff as Benno von Stulpnagel
- Katja Bienert as Carmen
- Claudine Wilde as Julie
- Kathie Kriegel as Louise

== Production and airing ==
Originally, RTL had planned the production of 52 episodes, but due to financial problems and differences in content, RTL program management and producer Jörn Schröder did not implement this project. 22 episodes were broadcast on the German private broadcaster RTL plus from September 1991 to May 1992. A repeat broadcast aired on Hamburg I urban area television from July to December 1997. The soundtrack to the series was composed by Grzegorz Ciechowski.

== Reception ==
The series has been noted for containing erotic and soft pornographic elements Heiko Kaletta of fernsehserien.de wrote: Schloß Pompon Rouge, in the rococo period. The marquis, owner of the chateau, was inspired by the lifestyle of the court of the French king in Versailles, in keeping with the spirit of the times. Thus, lively parties are celebrated and the castle resembles a single house of pleasure. The Marquis and his sex-hungry wife, the Marquise, spend their money and enjoy the finer things in life. Every now and then, important personalities appear at the castle; for example Casanova or the son of the Russian Tsar ...". Authors Dietrich Schwarzkopf and Walter Hömberg remarked in their book: "How sad it is that the RTL plus series Schloß Pompon - Rouge, as it was read, went erotically in the pants". Daniela Holzer in her 1999 book Die deutsche Sitcom: Format, Konzeption, Drehbuch, Umsetzung described the supporting actors of the series, both male and female, as "libidinous". She sarcastically commented that they were supposed to be "funny and frivolous".

== See also ==
- List of German television series
