= Seven Days Grace =

1969 film

- Movie Premier- Lead actors and director on a promotional cruise aboard the Mönkeberg. From left: Joachim Fuchsberger, Horst Tappert, Hilde Brand, director Alfred Vohrer, Konrad Georg.
- Directed by: Alfred Vohrer
- Written by: Paul Hendriks (novel); Manfred Purzer
- Produced by: Luggi Waldleitner
- Starring: Joachim Fuchsberger; Horst Tappert
- Cinematography: Ernst W. Kalinke
- Release date: 3 April 1969
- Running time: 100 minutes
- Country: West Germany
- Language: German

Seven Days Grace (German: Sieben Tage Frist) is a 1969 West German crime film directed by Alfred Vohrer. It was entered into the 6th Moscow International Film Festival.

== Cast ==
- Joachim Fuchsberger as Hendriks
- Horst Tappert as Klevenow
- Konrad Georg as Fromm
- Karin Hübner as Frau Muhl
- Petra Schürmann as Fräulein Gabert
- Hilde Brand as Lonny
- Bruno Dallansky as Herr Muhl
- Paul Albert Krumm as Stallmann
- Robert Meyn as Direktor
- Joachim Rake as Beamter
- Otto Stern as Kurrat Senior
