= Und Jimmy ging zum Regenbogen =

1971 West German drama film

- Directed by: Alfred Vohrer
- Screenplay by: Manfred Purzer
- Produced by: Luggi Waldleitner
- Starring: Alain Noury; Horst Tappert; Ruth Leuwerik
- Cinematography: Charly Steinberger
- Edited by: Jutta Hering
- Music by: Erich Ferstl
- Release date: 1971
- Running time: 133 minutes
- Country: West Germany
- Language: German

Und Jimmy ging zum Regenbogen ("The Caesar Code") is a movie by Alfred Vohrer based on the novel The Caesar Code by Johannes Mario Simmel. It was filmed in Vienna and Munich in autumn 1970 and released in March 1971.

== Plot ==
1969. In a Vienna bookshop the Argentine chemist Rafaelo Aranda is poisoned by the bookseller Valerie Steinfeld. The bookseller commits suicide immediately afterwards. It seems the bookseller has never met him before. The chemist's son, Manuel Aranda, wants to find out the background of this murder. He finds out that his father has developed chemical weapons of mass destruction and offered to sell them to the United States, the Soviet Union and France. The Secret Services of these countries try to prevent Aranda from publishing these facts. Aranda survives a first sniper attack without even noticing it.

Manuel Aranda learns that Valerie Steinfeld was involved in a risky paternity trial during the Third Reich. Her half-Jewish son was to be protected from the Nazis. Valerie Steinfeld had persuaded a friend to claim he was her son's father. The friend had no Jewish background and was a registered member of the Nazi Party. Slowly the suspicion arises that Steinfeld and Rafaelo Aranda might have had to do with each other at this time.

With the help of Irene Waldegg, the niece of Valerie Steinfeld, Manuel Aranda finds out about the Nazi past of his father. But Valerie Steinfeld also had her personal secret. Not even Irene Waldegg had known that she also was a part of Valerie Steinfeld's past.

== Cast ==
- Alain Noury - Manuel Aranda
- Horst Tappert - Lawyer Forster
- Ruth Leuwerik - Valerie Steinfeld
- Konrad Georg - Martin Landau
- Horst Frank - Flemming
- Judy Winter - Nora Hill
- Doris Kunstmann - Irene Waldegg
- Heinz Moog - Hofrat Groll
- Eva Zilcher - Tilly Landau
- Heinz Baumann - Grant
- Herbert Fleischmann - Mercier
- Peter Pasetti - Santarin
- Friedrich G. Beckhaus - Dr. Gloggnigg
- Paul Edwin Roth - Direktor Friedjung
- Klaus Schwarzkopf - Sirius
- Jochen Brockmann - Dr. Stein
- Bruno Dallansky - Schäfer
- Karl Walter Diess - Carlsson
- Franz Elkins - Heinz Steinfeld
- Anita Buchegger
- Paul Glawion
- Mascha Gonska - Bianca
- Michael Janisch - Clairon
- Egon von Jordan
- Walter Regelsberger
- Robert Werner
- Herbert Kersten
- Elisabeth Stiepl
- Walter Varndal
- Ludwig Hirsch - bell boy

== Literature ==
- Johannes Mario Simmel: The Caesar Code. Time Warner Publishing M/M (1986) ISBN 978-0-446-31358-2
