= Kommissar Freytag =

- Starring: Konrad Georg
- Country of origin: Germany

Kommissar Freytag is a German television series.

== See also ==
- List of German television series
