= Luggi Waldleitner =

German film producer (1913–1998)

- Born: 1 December 1913; Kirchseeon, Bavaria, German Empire
- Died: 16 January 1998 (aged 84); Innsbruck, Austria
- Occupation: Producer
- Years active: 1937–1998 (film)

Ludwig "Luggi" Waldleitner (1 December 1913 – 16 January 1998) was a German film producer. In 1951 he set up Roxy Film which became one of the country's leading film production companies.

== Selected filmography ==
- Carnival of Love (1943)
- Thank You, I'm Fine (1948)
- A Thousand Red Roses Bloom (1952)
- That Can Happen to Anyone (1952)
- Until We Meet Again (1952)
- Everything for Father (1953)
- A Musical War of Love (1953)
- Oasis (1955)
- The Barrings (1955)
- El Hakim (1957)
- The Daring Swimmer (1957)
- Rosemary (1958)
- Conny and Peter Make Music (1960)
- Boomerang (1960)
- The Last of Mrs. Cheyney (1961)
- Street of Temptation (1962)
- Eleven Years and One Day (1963)
- The Death of a Double (1967)
- The Duck Rings at Half Past Seven (1968)
- Seven Days Grace (1969)
- Perrak (1970)
- The Sex Nest (1970)
- Und Jimmy ging zum Regenbogen (1971)
- Love Is Only a Word (1971)
- Tears of Blood (1972)
- The Stuff That Dreams Are Made Of (1972)
- All People Will Be Brothers (1973)
- Three Men in the Snow (1974)
- Only the Wind Knows the Answer (1974)
- The Net (1975)
- To the Bitter End (1975)
- The Sternstein Manor (1976)
- The Glass Cell (1978)
- The Man in the Rushes (1978)
- The Marriage of Maria Braun (1979)
- Lili Marleen (1981)
- Silence Like Glass (1989)
- Fiorile (1993)
- Beyond Silence (1996)

== Bibliography ==
- The Concise CineGraph. Berghahn Books. 1 September 2009. doi:10.3167/9781571816559. ISBN 978-1-57181-655-9.
