= J. M. Simmel =

Austrian writer (1924–2009)

Johannes Mario Simmel
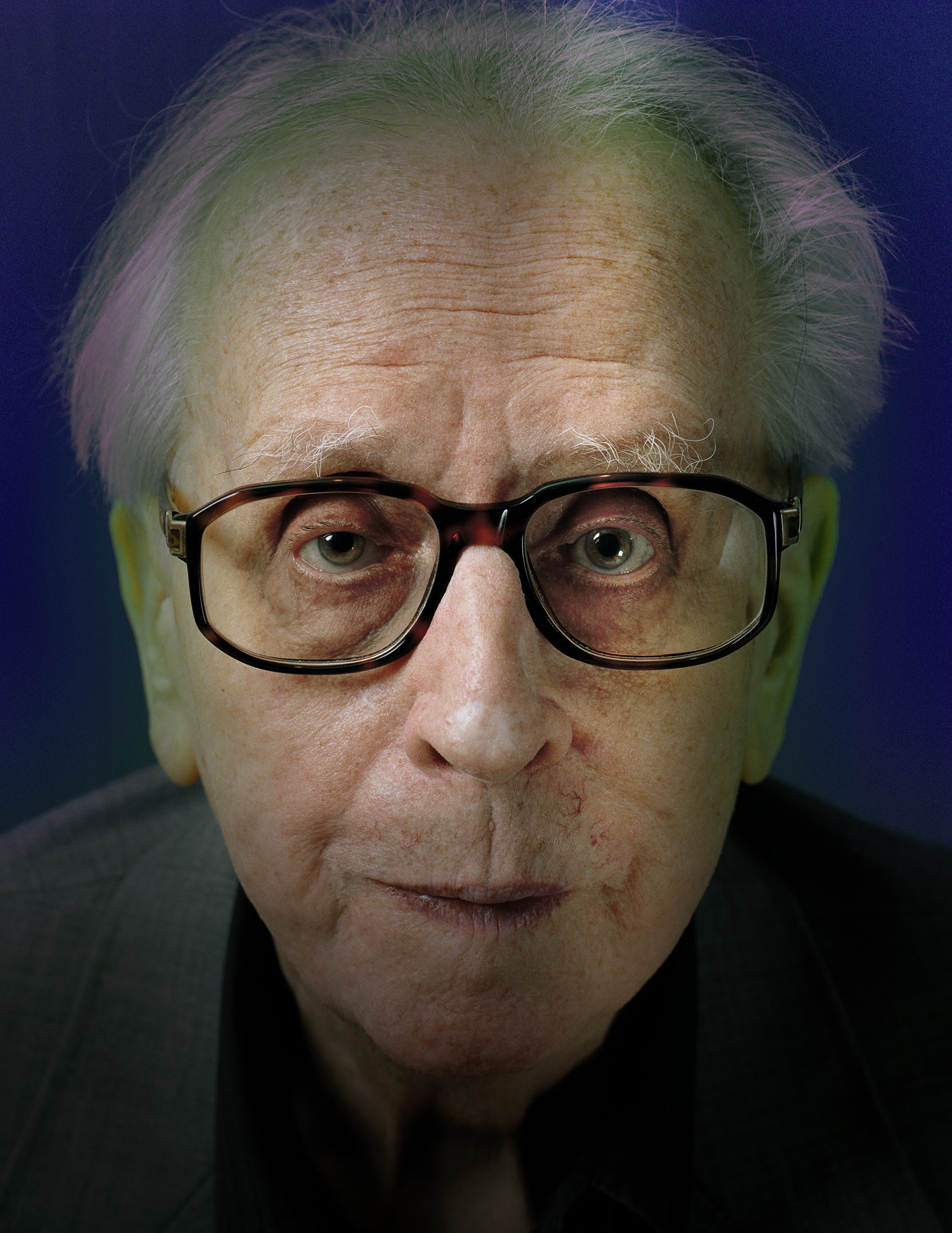
- Johannes Mario Simmel photographed by Oliver Mark, Zug 2007
- Born: 7 April 1924; Vienna, Austria
- Died: 1 January 2009 (aged 84); Lucerne, Switzerland
- Education: Chemical engineer
- Alma mater: Höhere Bundeslehr- und Versuchsanstalt für chemische Industrie
- Occupations: Novelist, screenwriter, journalist
- Writing career
- Period: 1949 – 1999
- Notable work: It can't always be caviar

Johannes Mario Simmel (7 April 1924 – 1 January 2009), also known as J. M. Simmel, was an Austrian writer.

He was born in Vienna and grew up in Austria and England. He was trained as a chemical engineer and worked in research from 1943 to the end of World War II. After the end of the war, he worked as a translator for the United States Office of Military Government based in Germany and published reviews and stories in the Vienna Welt am Abend. Starting in 1950, he worked as a reporter for the Munich illustrated Quick in Europe and America.

He wrote a number of screenplays and novels, which have sold tens of millions of copies. Many of his novels were successfully filmed in the 1960s and 1970s. He won numerous prizes, including the Award of Excellence of the Society of Writers of the UN. Important issues in his novels are a fervent pacifism as well as the relativity of good and bad. Several novels are said to have a true background, possibly autobiographic.

According to his Swiss lawyer, Simmel died on 1 January 2009 in Lucerne, at 84 years of age. This date was the 99th birthday of "Thomas Lieven", the main character of "It can't always be caviar."

== Awards and honors ==
- 1959 First prize in the competition playwright Mannheim
- 1981 Culture Award of German Freemasons (Lessing-Ring)
- 1984 Gold Medal of the City of Vienna
- 1992 Austrian Cross of Honour for Science and Art, 1st class
- 1993 Hermann Kesten Prize
- 2004: Grand Decoration of Honour in Silver for Services to the Republic of Austria
- 2005 Merit Cross 1st Class of the Federal Republic of Germany (Verdienstkreuz 1. Klasse)
- 2011 naming of Simmelgasse in Floridsdorf (the 21st district of Vienna)

== Bibliography ==
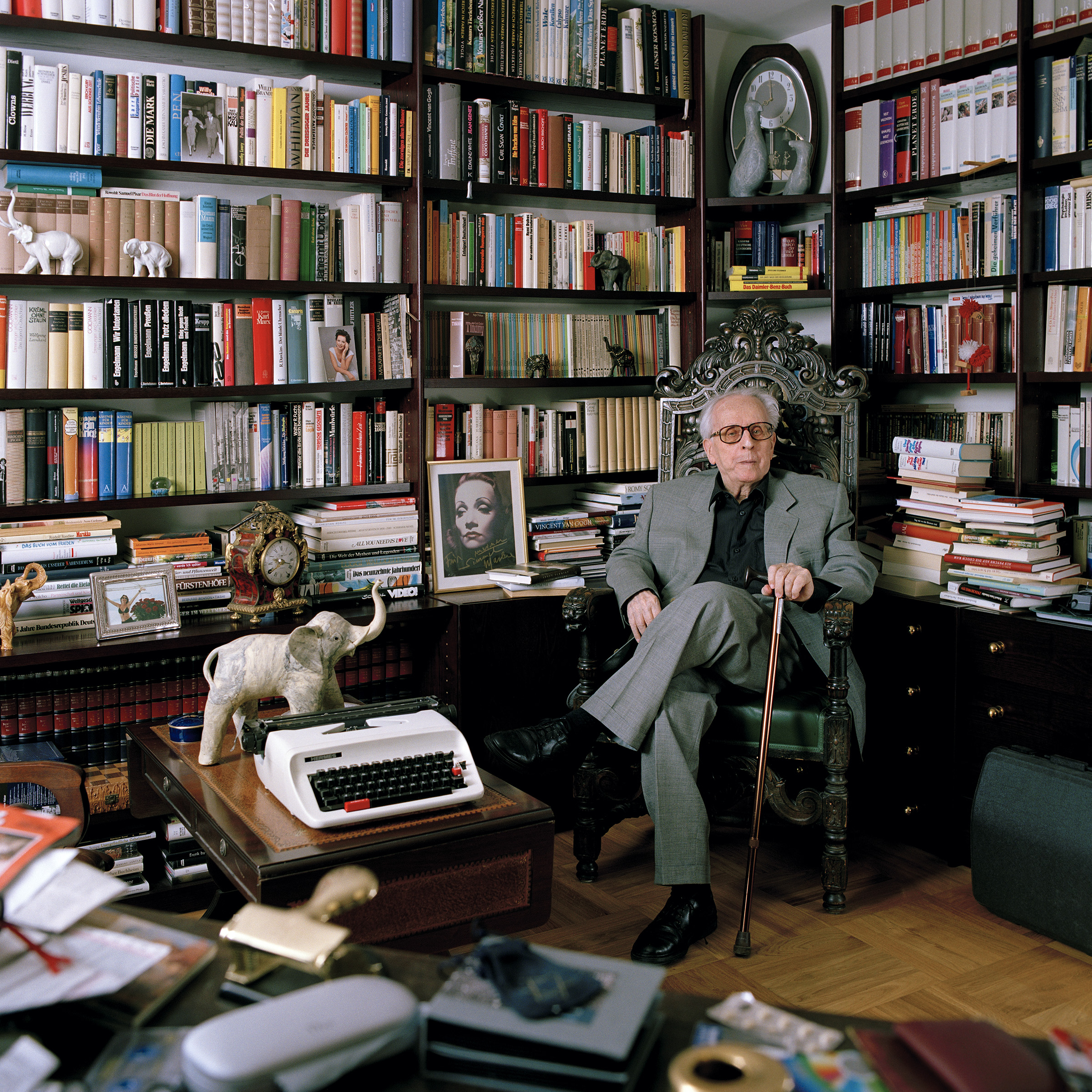
Johannes Mario Simmel photographed by Oliver Mark in his home in the city of Zug, 2007

- Encounters in the Fog ("Begegnung im Nebel." 1947)
- Why Am I So Happy? ("Mich wundert, daß ich so fröhlich bin." Zsolnay, Vienna 1949). The title is a quote from Martinus von Biberach (died 1498); but also hints at Heinrich Heine's 1837 poem "Die Lorelei": "Ich weiß nicht, was soll es bedeuten / Daß ich so traurig bin".
- Das geheime Brot. Zsolnay, Vienna 1950. (English: Secret, or hidden, bread.)
- Der Mörder trinkt keine Milch. Ein Kriminalroman. Demokratische Druck- und Verlags-Gesellschaft, Bären-Bücher 19, Linz 1950. (English: Murderers don't drink milk. A detective story.)
- Man lebt nur zweimal. Demokratische Druck- und Verlags-Gesellschaft, Bären-Bücher 21, Linz 1950. (English: You only live twice.) The title is a parody of the German proverb "Man lebt nur einmal".
- I Confess ("Ich gestehe alles." Zsolnay, Vienna 1953)
- The Pretender. Every Time He Ate Cake... ("Der Hochstapler. Immer, wenn er Kuchen aß...". Südverlag, München/Konstanz 1954), (mit Hans Hartmann)
- The Sibyl Cipher (Gott schützt die Liebenden, Zsolnay, Vienna 1957)
- The Affair of Nina B. ("Affäre Nina B.", Zsolnay, Vienna 1958)
- It Can't Always Be Caviar a.k.a. "The Monte Cristo Cover-up" ("Es muß nicht immer Kaviar sein.", Schweizer Druck- und Verlagshaus, Zürich 1960)
- To the Bitter End ("Bis zur bitteren Neige.", Knaur, München 1962)
- Love Is Just a Word ("Liebe ist nur ein Wort.", Knaur, München 1963)
- The Berlin Connection a.k.a. "Dear Fatherland" or "Double Agent - Triple Cross" ("Lieb Vaterland magst ruhig sein." Knaur, München 1965)
- The Cain Conspiracy a.k.a. "Cain '67" ("Alle Menschen werden Brüder.", Knaur, München 1967). The German title is taken from Schiller's 1785 poem "Ode to Joy".
- The Caesar Code ("Und Jimmy ging zum Regenbogen.", Knaur, München 1970). The German title is based on "And Teddy would run to the rainbow's foot" from a poem by Rudyard Kipling.
- The Traitor Blitz (Der Stoff aus dem die Träume sind, Knaur, München 1971). The German title is taken from Shakespeare's play The Tempest.
- The Wind and the Rain (Die Antwort kennt nur der Wind, Knaur, München 1973.)
- No Man Is an Island (Niemand ist eine Insel, Knaur, München 1975). The title is from Devotions upon Emergent Occasions (1624) by John Donne.
- A Bus, as big as the World (Ein Autobus, Groß wie die Welt, Knaur, 1976)
- Hurra, wir leben noch (Knaur, München 1978)
- Wir heißen euch hoffen (Knaur, München 1980)
- Let the Flowers Live ("Bitte, laßt die Blumen leben", Knaur, München 1983)
- The Secret Protocol ("Die im Dunkeln sieht man nicht", Knaur, München 1985)
- With the Clowns Came Tears ("Doch mit den Clowns kamen die Tränen", Knaur, München 1987)
- Im Frühling singt zum letztenmal die Lerche (Knaur, München 1990)
- Auch wenn ich lache, muß ich weinen (Knaur, München 1993)
- Dream the Impossible Dream ("Träum den unmöglichen Traum", Knaur, München 1996)
- The Man who painted the Almond Trees ("Der Mann, der die Mandelbäumchen malte", Knaur, München 1998)
- Love is the Last Bridge ("Liebe ist die letzte Brücke", Knaur, München 1999)

== Filmography ==
- My Schoolfriend, directed by Robert Siodmak (1960, based on the play Der Schulfreund)
- The Nina B. Affair, directed by Robert Siodmak (1961, based on the novel Affäre Nina B.)
- It Can't Always Be Caviar, directed by Géza von Radványi (1961, based on the novel Es muß nicht immer Kaviar sein)
- This Time It Must Be Caviar, directed by Géza von Radványi (1961, based on the novel Es muß nicht immer Kaviar sein)
- Und Jimmy ging zum Regenbogen, directed by Alfred Vohrer (1971, based on the novel Und Jimmy ging zum Regenbogen)
- Love Is Only a Word, directed by Alfred Vohrer (1971, based on the novel Liebe ist nur ein Wort)
- The Stuff That Dreams Are Made Of, directed by Alfred Vohrer (1972, based on the novel Der Stoff aus dem die Träume sind)
- All People Will Be Brothers, directed by Alfred Vohrer (1973, based on the novel Alle Menschen werden Brüder)
- The Sibyl Cipher, directed by Alfred Vohrer (1973, based on the novel Gott schützt die Liebenden)
- Only the Wind Knows the Answer, directed by Alfred Vohrer (1974, based on the novel Die Antwort kennt nur der Wind)
- To the Bitter End, directed by Gerd Oswald (1975, based on the novel Bis zur bitteren Neige)
- Dear Fatherland Be at Peace, directed by Roland Klick (1976, based on the novel Lieb Vaterland magst ruhig sein)
- Es muss nicht immer Kaviar sein, directed by Thomas Engel (1977, TV miniseries, based on the novel Es muß nicht immer Kaviar sein)
- Why Am I So Happy?, directed by Michael Kehlmann (1982, TV film, based on the novel Mich wundert, daß ich so fröhlich bin)
- The Roaring Fifties, directed by Peter Zadek (1983, based on the novel Hurra wir leben noch)
- Please, Let the Flowers Live, directed by Duccio Tessari (1986, based on the novel Bitte laßt die Blumen leben)
- Mit den Clowns kamen die Tränen, directed by Reinhard Hauff (1990, TV miniseries, based on the novel Doch mit den Clowns kamen die Tränen)
- The Caesar Code, directed by Carlo Rola (2008, TV film, based on the novel Und Jimmy ging zum Regenbogen)
- The Sibyl Cipher, directed by Carlo Rola (2008, TV film, based on the novel Gott schützt die Liebenden)
- Love Is Just a Word, directed by Carlo Rola (2010, based on the novel Liebe ist nur ein Wort)
- No Man Is an Island, directed by Carlo Rola (2011, TV film, based on the novel Niemand ist eine Insel)

=== Screenwriter ===
- 1951: Spring on Ice (dir. Georg Jacoby)
- 1953: Diary of a Married Woman (dir. Josef von Báky)
- 1955: Hotel Adlon (dir. Josef von Báky)
- 1955: Dunja (dir. Josef von Báky)
- 1956: Kitty and the Great Big World (dir. Alfred Weidenmann)
- 1957: The Girl and the Legend (dir. Josef von Báky)
- 1958: Stefanie (dir. Josef von Báky)
- 1960: Mit Himbeergeist geht alles besser (dir. Georg Marischka)
