= Elisabeth Volkmann =

German actress (1936–2006)

Elizabeth Volkmann
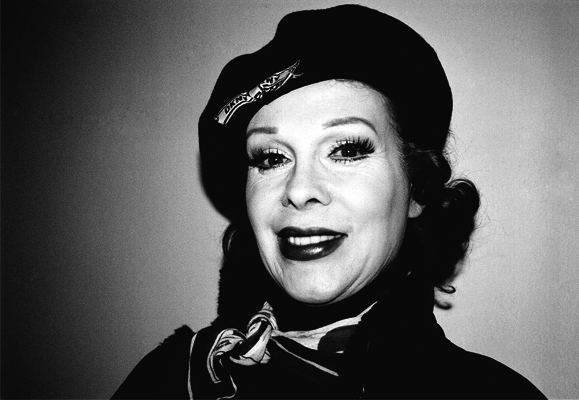
- Born: 16 March 1936; Essen, Gau Essen, Germany
- Died: 27 July 2006 (aged 70); Munich, Bavaria, Germany
- Occupations: Actress; comedian
- Years active: 1960–2006
- Spouse: Eberhard Radisch (m. 1998; died 2004)

Elisabeth Volkmann (German: [eˈliːzabɛt ˈfɔlkman]; 16 March 1936 – 27 July 2006) was a German actress and comedian, best known for her part in the German absurd comedy series Klimbim (1973–1979), which was watched by millions of viewers in Germany and, later on, as the voice of Marge Simpson in the German dub of The Simpsons. Volkmann was born in Essen, and died in Munich.

== Filmography ==
Year	Title	Role	Notes
1960	A Woman for Life	Baronin Irene von und zu Wachenheim	Uncredited
1961	Immer wenn es Nacht wird	Kitty	
1964	Mission to Hell	Secretary	Uncredited
1968	Take Off Your Clothes, Doll	Diana	
1969	Up the Establishment	Frau Schubert	
1970	Josefine Mutzenbacher	Stiefmutter	
1971	Josefine Mutzenbacher II – Meine 365 Liebhaber	Baronin / Wirtin	
1971	Hausfrauen-Report	Frau Demmler	
1971	Mache alles mit	Frau Gabor	
1971	Ehemänner-Report	Frau Berndorf	
1971	Holiday Report		
1971	Love Is Only a Word	Angenforts Sekretärin	
1971	Schüler-Report	Linda	
1971	Hausfrauen-Report 2	Kalinka	
1972	Die Klosterschülerinnen	Studienrätin Frisch	
1972	Die jungen Ausreißerinnen – Sex-Abenteuer deutscher Mädchen in aller Welt	Monika	
1972	Lehrmädchen-Report	Fräulein Schmidtke	
1972	Lass jucken Kumpel	Rosi Gernot	Voice, Uncredited
1972	Massagesalon der jungen Mädchen	Sonja	
1972	Sex-shop	Muriel	
1972	Nurse Report	Isabella Ziegler	
1973	Housewives on the Job	Doña Dolores	
1973	Love in 3-D	Rosi	
1973	All People Will Be Brothers	Vanessa	
1973	Junge Mädchen mögen's heiß, Hausfrauen noch heißer	Linda	
1973	Was Schulmädchen verschweigen	Edith Kersten	Uncredited
1973	Laß jucken Kumpel 2. Teil: Das Bullenkloster	Trudi Gimpel	Voice, Uncredited
1973–1979	Klimbim		TV series, 30 episodes
1973	Hausfrauen-Report 4	Elke Jensen	
1973	Auch Ninotschka zieht ihr Höschen aus	Veronique	
1973	Geh, zieh dein Dirndl aus	Gisela Horn	
1974	Three Men in the Snow (1)	Frau Mallebré	
1974	Alpine Glow in Dirndlrock	Hedda	
1974	Charley's Nieces	Berta Schwarzkopf	
1974	Bohr weiter, Kumpel	Frau Dose	
1974	Magdalena, vom Teufel besessen	Madame Stolz	
1974	Laß jucken, Kumpel 3. Teil – Maloche, Bier und Bett	Trudi Gimpel	Voice, Uncredited
1974	Zwei Rebläuse auf dem Weg zur Loreley	Else Schmitz – Mutter	
1975	Berlinger	Halm	
1977	Scrounged Meals	Maria	
1977	Derrick	Irmi Becker	Season 4, Episode 06: "Das Kuckucksei"
1981	Lili Marleen	Marika	
1981	Lola	Gigi	
1982	Veronika Voss	Grete	
1985	Red Heat	Einbeck	
1985	Tamboo		
1986	Manuel	Toni	
1988	The Vulture Wally	Erbfürstin	
1991–1992	Schloß Pompon Rouge	Marquise Marie-Antoinette de Pompon Rouge	TV series
1993	Kein Pardon	Hilde Schlönzke	
2002	The Antman	El Busto	

== Radioplay ==
- Die drei ??? (Three Investigators): Die Karten des Bösen, publisher: Europa (Sony Music) as Milva Summer (based on the novel by André Minninger)
