= Doris Kunstmann =

German actress

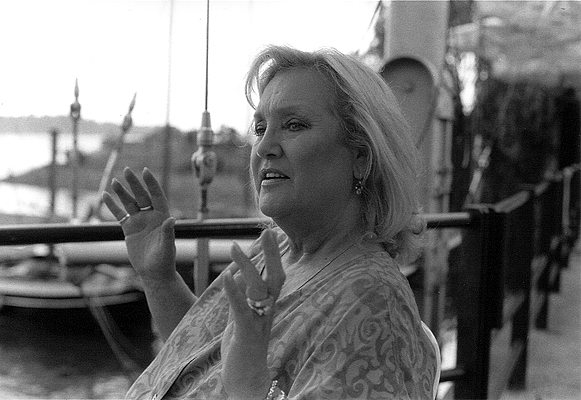
- Kunstmann in 2008
- Born: 22 October 1941 (age 84); Hamburg, Germany
- Occupation: Actress
- Years active: 1963–present

Doris Kunstmann (born 22 October 1941) is a German actress. She has appeared in more than one hundred films since 1963.

== Selected filmography ==
Year	Title	Role	Director	Notes
1967	Hot Pavements of Cologne	Susanne	Ernst Hofbauer	
1968	Bora Bora	Susanne	Ugo Liberatore	
1968	The Sex of Angels	Nora	Ugo Liberatore	
1969	Your Caresses	Christine	Herbert Vesely, Peter Schamoni	
1969	Lovemaker	Christiane	Ugo Liberatore	
1971	Und Jimmy ging zum Regenbogen	Irene Waldegg	Alfred Vohrer	
1971	Trotta	Elisabeth Kovacs	Johannes Schaaf	
1973	Joseph Balsamo	Andrée de Taverney	André Hunebelle	TV miniseries
1973	All People Will Be Brothers	Lillian Lombard	Alfred Vohrer	
1973	Seven Deaths in the Cat's Eye	Suzanne	Antonio Margheriti	
1973	Hitler: The Last Ten Days	Eva Braun	Ennio De Concini	
1974	Ein ganz perfektes Ehepaar	Angela Krieg	Ula Stöckl	
1975	Herbstzeitlosen	Melanie	Dagmar Damek	TV film
1975	Depression	Caroline	Herbert Vesely	TV film; Goldene Kamera – Best German Actress
1975	Inside Out	Erika Kurtz	Peter Duffell	
1976	Le Jeune Homme et le Lion	Aude	Jean Delannoy	TV film
1977	The Brothers	Sandra Fachmin	Wolf Gremm	
1977	Orzowei	Anna	Yves Allégret	TV miniseries
1983	Nesthäkchen	Elsbeth Braun	Gero Erhardt	TV miniseries
1987	The Cry of the Owl	Vicky	Tom Toelle	TV film
1991	Walking a Tightrope	Christa Paeffgen-Aoussine	Nikos Papatakis	
1994	Women Are Simply Wonderful	Mother	Sherry Hormann	
1997	Funny Games	Gerda	Michael Haneke	
1998	Bus 152	Mrs. Weber	Richard Huber	TV film
2003	SOKO Kitzbühel	Dr. Anastasia Stein	Michael Zens	TV series, Episode: Au Pair
2006	French Fried Vacation 3	Madame Franken	Patrice Leconte	
2008–09	Rote Rosen	Melanie Baumann		TV series
2009	Mord ist mein Geschäft, Liebling	Frau Eisenstein	Sebastian Niemann	
