= Your Caresses =

1969 film

- Directed by: Peter Schamoni; Herbert Vesely
- Written by: Esteban López
- Based on: Wie Bruder und Schwester und andere bittere Sachen by Esteban López
- Produced by: Peter Schamoni
- Starring: Doris Kunstmann; Ulli Lommel; Bernhard Wicki
- Cinematography: Michael Ballhaus
- Edited by: Heidi Genée
- Music by: Roland Kovac
- Production companies: Peter Schamoni Film; Stella Film
- Distributed by: Alpha Film
- Release date: 6 November 1969
- Running time: 92 minutes
- Country: West Germany
- Language: German

Your Caresses (German: Deine Zärtlichkeiten) is a 1969 West German drama film directed by Peter Schamoni and Herbert Vesely and starring Doris Kunstmann, Ulli Lommel and Bernhard Wicki. Location shooting took place in Baden-Baden, Barcelona, Ibiza, Seeshaupt and Munich.

== Cast ==
- Doris Kunstmann as Christine
- Ulli Lommel as Stefan
- Bernhard Wicki as Vaeter
- Charlotte Kerr as Mutter
- Irene Soederberg as Monika
- Heinz Meier as Onkel
- Maria Schamoni as Tante Maria
- Lola Dumas as Playgirl in Barcelona
- Ginny Gottschalk as Yachtbesitzerin/Yacht owner
- Molly Jones as Mädchen im Swimmingpool
- Erika Kunstmann as Madame de Plaisir
- Dolores Mis as Nina im Salon
- Uta Wohlfahrt as Chefin von Punta Arabi
- Eugenio Sentís as Don Jaime
- Ernest Ehrenfeld as Künstler in Ibiza
- Michael Herkenrath as Stefans Schulfreund
- Julio Pinheiro as Mann aus Barcelona
- Leo Weisse as Verfolger
- Roger Fritz as Party Guest

== Bibliography ==
- Bock, Hans-Michael & Bergfelder, Tim. The Concise CineGraph. Encyclopedia of German Cinema. Berghahn Books, 2009.
- Bronnen, Barbara & Brocher, Corinna. Die Filmemacher:: zur neuen deutschen Produktion nach Oberhausen 1962. Bertelsmann, 1973.
