= Konrad Georg =

German actor

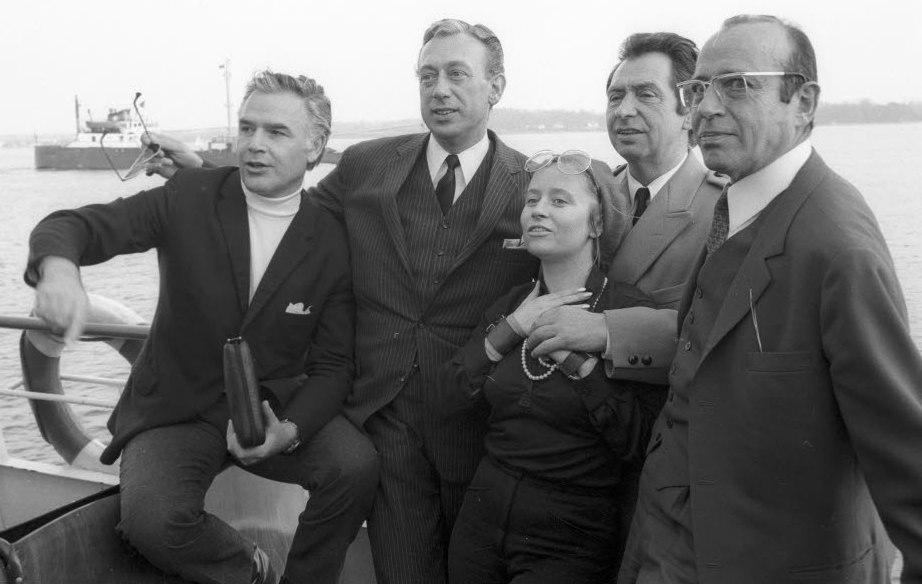
- Georg (right) with colleagues in 1969
- Born: 25 December 1914; Mainz, German Empire
- Died: 8 September 1987 (aged 72); Hamburg, West Germany
- Occupation: Actor
- Years active: 1956-1987 (film & TV)

Konrad Georg (1914–1987) was a German film, stage and television actor. A veteran performer he appeared in numerous films and television programmes in West Germany. Between 1963 and 1966 he played the title role in the television crime series Kommissar Freytag.

== Partial filmography ==
- Tim Frazer (1963–64, TV Series)
- Kommissar Freytag (1963–1966, TV series) - Kommissar Werner Freytag
- In the Matter of J. Robert Oppenheimer (1964, TV film) - Herbert S. Marks
- Call Girls of Frankfurt (1966) - Kommissar Reinisch
- Is Paris Burning? (1966) - Gen. Field Marshal Model
- Zwei wie wir... und die Eltern wissen von nichts (1966) - Dr. Felten
- The College Girl Murders (1967) - Keyston
- When Night Falls on the Reeperbahn (1967) - Hauptkommissar Zinner
- Dead Body on Broadway (1969) - Mr. Ross
- Seven Days Grace (1969) - Fromm
- Heintje: A Heart Goes on a Journey (1969) - Polizei-Inspektor
- Köpfchen in das Wasser, Schwänzchen in die Höh’ (1969) - Dr. Ahrens
- On the Reeperbahn at Half Past Midnight (1969) - Kriminalrat Norbert Krause
- 11 Uhr 20 (1970, TV miniseries) - Herr Konrad
- Hotel by the Hour (1970) - Polizeirat Dr. Marschall
- Und Jimmy ging zum Regenbogen (1971) - Martin Landau
- Love Is Only a Word (1971) - Professor
- The Stuff That Dreams Are Made Of (1972) - Jacques Jean Garnot
- Trouble with Trixie (1972) - Mr. Brown
- Tears of Blood (1972)
- All People Will Be Brothers (1973) - Paradin
- Seven Deaths in the Cat's Eye (1973) - Campbell
- Story of a Cloistered Nun (1973) - Father Confessor
- Auch ich war nur ein mittelmäßiger Schüler (1974) - Krüger
- Only the Wind Knows the Answer (1974) - Prof. Jaubert
- Der Strick um den Hals (1975, TV miniseries) - Daubigeon
- Slavers (1977) - Attaché
- Randale (1983)

== Bibliography ==
- Martin Compart. Crime TV: Lexikon der Krimi-Serien. Bertz + Fischer, 2000.
