= Alain Noury =

French actor (born 1945)

- Born: 4 November 1945 (age 80); Paris, France
- Occupation: Actor
- Years active: 1967-present

Alain Noury (born 4 November 1945) is a French actor. He appeared in more than twenty films since 1967.

== Selected filmography ==
Year	Title	Role	Notes
1967	The Wanderer	Frantz de Galais	
1969	Youth March	Giulio Govoni	
1970	The Females	Johnny	
1970	Love Me Strangely	Dino	
1971	Und Jimmy ging zum Regenbogen	Manuel Aranda	
1972	Tears of Blood	Alain	
1975	Story of O	Ivan	
1981	Peacetime in Paris	Mikelandjelo	
1986	The Beauty of Vice		
