= The Hound of Blackwood Castle =

- Directed by: Alfred Vohrer
- Written by: Edgar Wallace (story); Herbert Reinecker
- Based on: Grimsby’s Hound (story) by Edgar Wallace
- Produced by: Horst Wendlandt; Erwin Gitt
- Starring: Heinz Drache; Karin Baal; Horst Tappert
- Cinematography: Karl Löb
- Edited by: Jutta Hering
- Music by: Peter Thomas
- Production company: Rialto Film
- Distributed by: Constantin Film
- Release date: 18 January 1968
- Running time: 92 minutes
- Country: West Germany
- Language: German

The Hound of Blackwood Castle (German: Der Hund von Blackwood Castle) is a 1968 West German crime film directed by Alfred Vohrer and starring Heinz Drache, Karin Baal and Horst Tappert. Based on a story by Edgar Wallace, it also draws inspiration from Arthur Conan Doyle's 1902 novel The Hound of the Baskervilles. It was shot at the Spandau Studios in Berlin and on location around the city. The film's sets were designed by the art directors Walter Kutz and Wilhelm Vorwerg. It was part of a long-running series of Krimi films produced by Rialto Film and based on the works of Wallace.

== Synopsis ==
Scotland Yard are called in to investigate a series of killings at Blackwood Castle, apparently committed by a giant animal.

== Cast ==
- Heinz Drache as Humphrey Connery
- Karin Baal as Jane Wilson
- Horst Tappert as Donald Fairbanks
- Siegfried Schürenberg as Sir John
- Agnes Windeck as Lady Agathy Beverton
- Ilse Pagé as Miss Finley
- Mady Rahl as Catherine Wilson
- Uta Levka as Dorothy Cornick
- Hans Söhnker as Anwalt Robert Jackson
- Otto Stern as The Captain
- Alexander Engel as Doc Adams
- Tilo von Berlepsch as Lord Henry Beverton
- Harry Wüstenhagen as Ken Nelson
- Kurd Pieritz as Edward Baldwin
- Arthur Binder as Grimsby
- Rainer Brandt as Tom Heyes
- Kurt Waitzmann as Dr. Sheppard
- Paul Berger as Hausknecht Jameson

== Bibliography ==
- Bergfelder, Tim. International Adventures: German Popular Cinema and European Co-Productions in the 1960s. Berghahn Books, 2005.
