= The College Girl Murders =

- Directed by: Alfred Vohrer
- Screenplay by: Herbert Reinecker; Harald G. Petersson
- Produced by: Horst Wendlandt; Preben Philipsen
- Starring: Joachim Fuchsberger; Uschi Glas; Grit Boettcher; Konrad Georg; Harry Riebauer; Tilly Lauenstein; Ilse Pagé
- Cinematography: Karl Löb
- Edited by: Jutta Hering
- Music by: Martin Böttcher
- Production company: Rialto Film
- Distributed by: Constantin Film
- Release date: August 11, 1967 (West Germany)
- Running time: 88 minutes
- Country: West Germany
- Language: German

The College Girl Murders (German: Der Mönch mit der Peitsche) is a 1967 West German krimi film directed by Alfred Vohrer and starring Joachim Fuchsberger, Uschi Glas and Grit Boettcher. The film was part of Rialto Film's long-running series of film adaptations of Edgar Wallace works which began a cycle that started in the late 1950s.

The College Girl Murders was an adaptation of Wallace's The Terror. The story had already been adapted by Rialto two years earlier as The Sinister Monk, which had 2.5 million spectators during its initial theatrical run. The College Girl Murders was made later in this cycle and adapts influence from other contemporary series at the time such as the British James Bond films and the Dr. Mabuse film series.

== Cast ==
- Joachim Fuchsberger as Inspektor Higgins
- Uschi Glas as Ann Portland
- Grit Boettcher as Betty Falks
- Konrad Georg as Keyston
- Harry Riebauer as Mark Denver
- Tilly Lauenstein as Harriet Foster
- Ilse Pagé as Sekretärin
- Siegfried Rauch as Frank Keeney
- Claus Holm as Glenn Powers

== Background and production ==
Rialto Film produced a cycle of West German adaptations of English author Edgar Wallace's work in a uniquely West German style of crime thriller known as the kriminalfilme or krimis. Originally based in Denmark, Rialto Film made a series of Wallace adaptations with Der Frosch mit der Maske (1959) and Der rote Kreis (1960) which were aimed at the German film market and were successes in German film box office. Rialto created a German part of their company that was a subdivision of Constantin Film that would focus on the developing and releasing these films.

The College Girl Murders was an adaptation of Wallace's The Terror. The story had already been adapted by Rialto two years earlier as The Sinister Monk. The Sinister Monk, had 2.5 million spectators during its initial theatrical run. In his book German Popular Cinema and the Rialto Krimi Phenomenon: Dark Eyes of London (2020), author Nicholas G. Schlegel said that at this period, Rialto was adding flourishes of other contemporary film series. This was due to the influence of producer Horst Wendlandt who wanted a proven tropes from other series at a time when Rialto was experiencing what Schlegel called a "waning cultural relevance" of the company.

The film was shot between April 26, and June 9, 1967 at CCC Studios in Berlin and on location at Moabit Prison, Ss. Peter and Paul church on Nikolskoë, Pfaueninsel, and Teufelsberg.

== Release and reception ==
The College Girl Murders had its was distributed by Constantin Film and had its premiere at the Mathäser Filmpalast in Munich, Germany on August 11, 1967. It was first shown on German television on April 11, 1985 on Programmgesellschaft für Kabel und Satellite (PKS), a channel that began broadcasting on in 1984. The channel was relaunched as Sat1 in 1985. The majority of Rialto's krimis never saw theatrical distribution in the United States, and were sold through a television syndication packages acquired by small time distributor Roberts and Barry. It was released to American Television by 1970 as College Girl Murders. The film was released on DVD by Dark Sky Films on October 28, 2005. This version only contains the English-language dub.

In his book German Popular Cinema and the Rialto Krimi Phenomenon: Dark Eyes of London (2020), author Nicholas G. Schlegel said that the film following Die blaue Hand, Der Mönch mit der Peitsche represented "a pop-art composite of recently overused Wallace tropes (the all-girl school setting, hooded monks with whips, tiresome inheritances)" as well as cribbing from other series such as Dr. Mabuse and James Bond series. Schlegel said the film contained uninspired performances and unimaginative direction, he concluded that the "overly familiar plot nonetheless delivers high entertainment value simply because of its "over the top" execution."
