= Sonderdezernat K1 =

German television series

- Starring: Gert Günther Hoffmann; Hubert Suschka
- Country of origin: Germany

Sonderdezernat K1 is a German television series that ran from 1972 to 1982.

== See also ==
- List of German television series
