= Gerd Oswald =

American film director

- Born: June 9, 1919; Berlin, Germany
- Died: May 22, 1989 (aged 69); Los Angeles, California, United States
- Occupation: Film director
- Parent: Richard Oswald

Gerd Oswald (June 9, 1919 – May 22, 1989) was a German director of American films and television.

== Biography ==
Born in Berlin, Oswald was the son of German film director Richard Oswald and actress Käthe Oswald. He worked as a child actor before emigrating to the United States in 1938. Early production jobs at low-budget studios like Monogram Pictures prepared Oswald for a directorial career.

Oswald's film credits include A Kiss Before Dying (1956), Valerie (1957), Crime of Passion (1957), Brainwashed (1960), and Bunny O'Hare (1971).

His television credits include Perry Mason, Blue Light, Bonanza, The Outer Limits, The Fugitive, Star Trek, Gentle Ben, It Takes a Thief, Rawhide, and The Twilight Zone (1985 TV series). Oswald directed the 1966 film Agent for H.A.R.M., which was the basis of a Mystery Science Theater 3000 episode.

He was an assistant director for 20 years, including on his father's film The Captain from Köpenick (completed in 1941, but only released in 1945), aka Passport to Heaven and I Was a Criminal.

Oswald was the uncredited second-unit director of The Longest Day (1962) responsible for staging the parachute drop scenes into Sainte-Mère-Église, France on D-Day, during the Normandy landings of World War II.

Oswald died of cancer in Los Angeles, California, at the age of 69.
