= Der Kommissar (TV series) =

German television series

- Schramm (sitting); Glemnitz, Wepper, Ode (from left to right)
- Created by: Herbert Reinecker
- Starring: Erik Ode; Günther Schramm; Reinhard Glemnitz; Fritz Wepper
- Country of origin: West Germany
- No. of episodes: 97

Production
- Executive producer: Helmut Ringelmann
- Running time: 55 Minutes

Original release
- Network: ZDF
- Release: 3 January 1969 – 30 January 1976

Der Kommissar (English The Police Inspector) is a German television series first broadcast between 1969 and 1976. It is about a group of detectives of the Munich homicide squad (Mordkommission). All 97 episodes (55 minutes each) were shot in black-and-white, and were written by Herbert Reinecker and starred Erik Ode as Kommissar Herbert Keller. Keller's assistants were Walter Grabert (Günther Schramm), Robert Heines (Reinhard Glemnitz), and Harry Klein (Fritz Wepper) who, in 1974, was replaced by his younger brother (also in real life) Erwin Klein (Elmar Wepper).

According to cultural historians, the series is notable for its impact on post-war German television audiences, depicting an image of disciplined, knowledgeable, and nonviolent German heroes. The iconic German police inspector portrayed in Der Kommissar has also been called the German equivalent of the conservative British police detective.

== History ==
Today considered cult television, Der Kommissar had many of the ingredients of the whodunnit: a murder victim, often unidentified at first; a group of suspects who gradually emerge as the police gather all the evidence available to them; and a police detective who, by sheer reasoning, figures out all by himself who the murderer is, while he has his assistants do all the legwork. In some episodes, Kommissar Keller even asks everyone to gather at the scene of the crime so that he, in the manner of Hercule Poirot, can reconstruct the events leading up to, and following, the killing so that the murderer can eventually be arrested.

In Der Kommissar, author Herbert Reinecker neatly captures the zeitgeist of the late 1960s and early 1970s by presenting many young characters that are involved in a crime. These young people usually wear trendy clothes and listen to the songs from the hit parade, be it at home or in seedy pubs, night clubs, or discotheques. In Reinecker's world, a young girl who leaves her parents and moves from the country to the anonymous and evil big city—Munich—will necessarily end up as either a prostitute, or a drug addict, or a murder victim, or all of the above.

Also, at a time of shifting moral standards in the wake of the Sexual Revolution, Keller can only shake his head—only inwardly though—at the follies of middle-aged bourgeois people who think they can practice infidelity and get away with it unscathed. As a matter of fact Der Kommissar is full of bizarre relationships: There is the middle-aged wife of an academic who starts an affair with the young waiter of the local restaurant although the latter lives in a rented room and his landlady sees and hears everything; there is the wealthy entrepreneur who takes a liking to the attractive wife of his live-in servant and who arranges for her to spend the nights with him upstairs in the master bedroom; and there is the mother of a teenage daughter who, whenever her husband is working the night shift, sleeps with a boy the same age as her daughter.

However, Kommissar Keller's ways are also rather contentious by today's standards. He is hardly ever seen without a burning cigarette; he regularly drinks on duty; and he addresses everyone who works in his office with the familiar du but at the same time expects them to use the much more formal Sie when talking to him. Keller justifies that habit of his in his very first conversation with Erwin Klein (1974):

Ich muss dir gleich etwas sagen. Ich habe vielleicht die etwas schlechte Angewohnheit, meine Mitarbeiter bei der täglichen Arbeit zu duzen. Und das ärgert manche Leute, die finden das nicht richtig und die halten das für autoritär, das ist natürlich vollkommener Quatsch mit Soße. Ich duze euch, weil ihr mir näher steht als alle anderen und weil es vielleicht ein bisschen zu spät sein dürfte, mich jetzt noch zu ändern. Begreifst du das?

I have to tell you one thing right away. I may have the bad habit of duzen (using the informal address "du" to) my work colleagues in our daily job. Some people are annoyed by that, they don't think it's right, they think it's authoritarian. This is baloney of course. I duze (use the informal address "du" to) you because you are closer to me than anyone else and because it may be a bit too late for me to change. Do you understand?

Over the years, an impressive number of guest actors and actresses appeared on the show, with even the odd UFA star among them. The guests were, to name just a few, Heinz Bennent (twice), Anton Diffring, Hannelore Elsner (twice), Peter van Eyck, Götz George (three times), Raimund Harmstorf, Johannes Heesters, Paul Hubschmid, Gottfried John, Curd Jürgens (twice), Christine Kaufmann, Helmut Käutner, Marianne Koch, Christiane Krüger (three times), Ruth Leuwerik, Lilli Palmer, Eric Pohlmann (twice), Wolfgang Preiss, Charles Régnier (three times), Heinz Reincke (twice), Walter Rilla, Maria Schell (three times), Nadja Tiller, Margarethe von Trotta (three times), Karl Michael Vogler, Bernhard Wicki (twice) and Sonja Ziemann.

In 1974, two years before the final episode of The Kommissar was broadcast, Reinecker launched a new series, Derrick, establishing some kind of continuity by promoting Harry Klein, now Derrick's assistant, to the post of Inspektor (in the same building, "just down the corridor").

== See also ==
- Derrick
- Die Kommissarin
- The Old Fox
