= Alfred Vohrer =

German film director

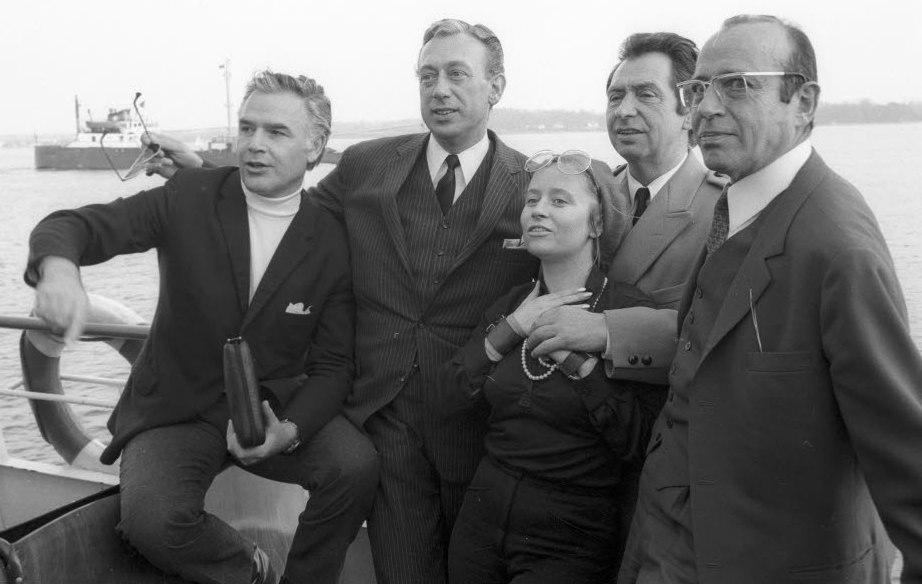
- Alfred Vohrer (second from right)
- Born: 29 December 1914; Stuttgart, German Empire
- Died: 3 February 1986 (aged 71); Munich, West Germany
- Occupations: Film director, actor
- Years active: 1958–1984

Alfred Vohrer (29 December 1914 – 3 February 1986) was a German film director and actor. He directed 48 films between 1958 and 1984. His 1969 film Seven Days Grace was entered into the 6th Moscow International Film Festival. His 1972 film Tears of Blood was entered into the 8th Moscow International Film Festival. His 1974 film Only the Wind Knows the Answer was entered into the 9th Moscow International Film Festival.

== Selected filmography ==
- Dirty Angel (1958)
- My Ninety Nine Brides (1958)
- Crime After School (1959)
- Mit 17 weint man nicht (1960)
- The Dead Eyes of London (1961)
- Our House in Cameroon (1961)
- The Door with Seven Locks (1962)
- The Inn on the River (1962)
- The Squeaker (1963)
- The Indian Scarf (1963)
- An Alibi for Death (1963)
- Mark of the Tortoise (1964)
- Der Hexer (1964)
- Among Vultures (1964)
- Neues vom Hexer (1965)
- Old Surehand (1965)
- Long Legs, Long Fingers (1966)
- The Hunchback of Soho (1966)
- Winnetou and Old Firehand (1966)
- Creature with the Blue Hand (1967)
- The College Girl Murders (1967)
- The Hound of Blackwood Castle (1968)
- The Zombie Walks (1968)
- The Gorilla of Soho (1968)
- The Man with the Glass Eye (1969)
- Seven Days Grace (1969)
- Herzblatt oder Wie sag ich’s meiner Tochter? (1969)
- The Sex Nest (1970)
- Perrak (1970)
- Und Jimmy ging zum Regenbogen (1971)
- Love Is Only a Word (1971)
- The Stuff That Dreams Are Made Of (1972)
- Tears of Blood (1972)
- All People Will Be Brothers (1973)
- The Sibyl Cipher (1973)
- Three Men in the Snow (1974)
- Wer stirbt schon gerne unter Palmen (1974)
- Only the Wind Knows the Answer (1974)
- Crime After School (1975)
- Der Edelweißkönig (1975)
- Derrick (1975–1986, TV series, 28 episodes)
- Everyone Dies Alone (1976)
- Anita Drögemöller und die Ruhe an der Ruhr (1976)
- Silence in the Forest (1976)
- The Old Fox (1977–1981, TV series, 12 episodes)
- Das Traumschiff (1983–1984, TV series, 6 episodes)
- Weißblaue Geschichten (1984–1986, TV series, 6 episodes)
- The Black Forest Clinic (1985, TV series, 12 episodes)
