= Roxy Film =

German film company

- Company type: Film production company
- Industry: Film
- Founded: 1951
- Founder: Luggi Waldleitner

Roxy Film is a German film production company established in 1951 by Luggi Waldleitner. During the 1950s, it was a leading producer with films such as melodramas which continued the traditions of the 1930s and 1940s. The company was responsible for the first German-American co-production since World War II, Oasis (1955). The company's most successful films in its first 10 years were Das Mädchen Rosemarie (1958), which was a joint winner of the Golden Globe Award for Best Foreign Language Film, and El Hakim. During the 1960s the company struggled, partly due to fierce competition from other producers such as Rialto Films which were better at using new genres such as Edgar Wallace thrillers and Karl May westerns, and due to lack of government support of the film industry.

By the late 1960s the company had begun to specialise in making sex comedies, but in the 1970s moved to producing adaptations of classic literature and funding ambitious projects by members of the New German Cinema such as Rainer Werner Fassbinder.

== Bibliography ==
- Bock, Hans-Michael & Bergfelder, Tim. The Concise CineGraph. Encyclopedia of German Cinema. Berghahn Books, 2009.
