= The Countess Died of Laughter =

1973 film by Franz Antel

- Directed by: Franz Antel
- Written by: Kurt Nachmann; Vittoria Vigorelli
- Produced by: Franz Antel; Carl Szokoll
- Starring: Gabriele Tinti; Teri Tordai
- Cinematography: Siegfried Hold
- Edited by: Femi Benussi
- Music by: Stelvio Cipriani
- Production companies: Cinemar; Neue Delta Filmproduktion
- Distributed by: Constantin Film (West Germany)
- Release dates: 11 April 1973 (Italy); 19 April 1973 (West Germany)
- Running time: 86 minutes
- Countries: Austria; Italy
- Language: German/Italian

The Countess Died of Laughter (German: Frau Wirtins tolle Töchterlein, Italian: Leva lo diavolo tuo dal... convento) is a 1973 Austrian-Italian sex comedy film directed by Franz Antel. It is the final entry in Franz Antel's series Frau Wirtin and incorporates a great deal of archive footage from earlier films.

== Plot ==
Susanne Delberg, who has become Countess Süderland, dies under absurd circumstances. It is revealed that Susanne had a daughter, whom she had named heiress to her inheritance. However, the only thing known about the heiress's identity is that she lives in a convent. Handsome executor Vincent van der Straten is tasked with uncovering her identity. There are five possible candidates: Françoise, Clarissa, Susanne, Piroschka, and Anselma. Van der Straten decides to stay at the convent to find the real heiress but things soon prove to be difficult for him since all the candidates happen to be just as raunchy as the late Susanne.

== Cast ==
- Teri Tordai as Susanne Delberg
- Gabriele Tinti as Vincent van der Straaten
- Femi Benussi as Clarissa
- Christina Losta as Francoise
- Marika Mindzenthy as Piroschka
- Alena Penz as Anselma
- Sonja Jeannine as Susanne
- Margot Hielscher as Reverend Mother
- Paul Löwinger as Antonius
- Kurt Großkurth as Monk
- Jacques Herlin as Monsieur Dulac
- Hans Terofal as Jussuf
- Franz Muxeneder as Farmer
- Galliano Sbarra as Governatore
- Joanna Jung as Anna
- Maja Hoppe as Telltale Girl
- Erich Padalewski as Piroschka's Lover
- Dolores Schmidinger as Nun
- Raoul Retzer as Osmin
- Raimund Folkert as Florian
