= Einer spinnt immer =

1971 film by Franz Antel

- Directed by: Franz Antel
- Written by: Willy Pribil
- Produced by: Franz Antel (producer); Kurt Kodal (executive producer); Carl Szokoll (producer)
- Starring: See below
- Cinematography: Hanns Matula
- Edited by: Claus von Boro
- Music by: Gerhard Heinz
- Release date: 1971
- Running time: 84 minutes
- Countries: Austria; West Germany
- Language: German

Einer spinnt immer is a 1971 Austrian / West German film directed by Franz Antel.

== Cast ==
- Georg Thomalla as Hugo Haase
- Teri Tordai as Clarisse
- Uwe Friedrichsen as Uwe Falk
- Elfie Pertramer as Beate Haase
- Brigitte Grothum as Diane
- Eva Basch as Grit Haase
- Ralf Wolter as Notar
- Jacques Herlin as Dr. Klemm
- Gunther Philipp as Major Waldemar Hammerschlag
- Herbert Fux as Ganove
- Paula Elges as Frau Huber
- Ossi Wanka as Boy
- Marika Kilius as herself (guest appearance)
- Hans-Jürgen Bäumler as himself
- Carlo Böhm as Neubauer
- Erich Kleiber as Ganove
- Gerhard Steffen
- Franz Muxeneder as Bahnwärter
- Otto Ambros as Supermarktmanager
