= Rosemarie Lindt =

German actress and ballet dancer

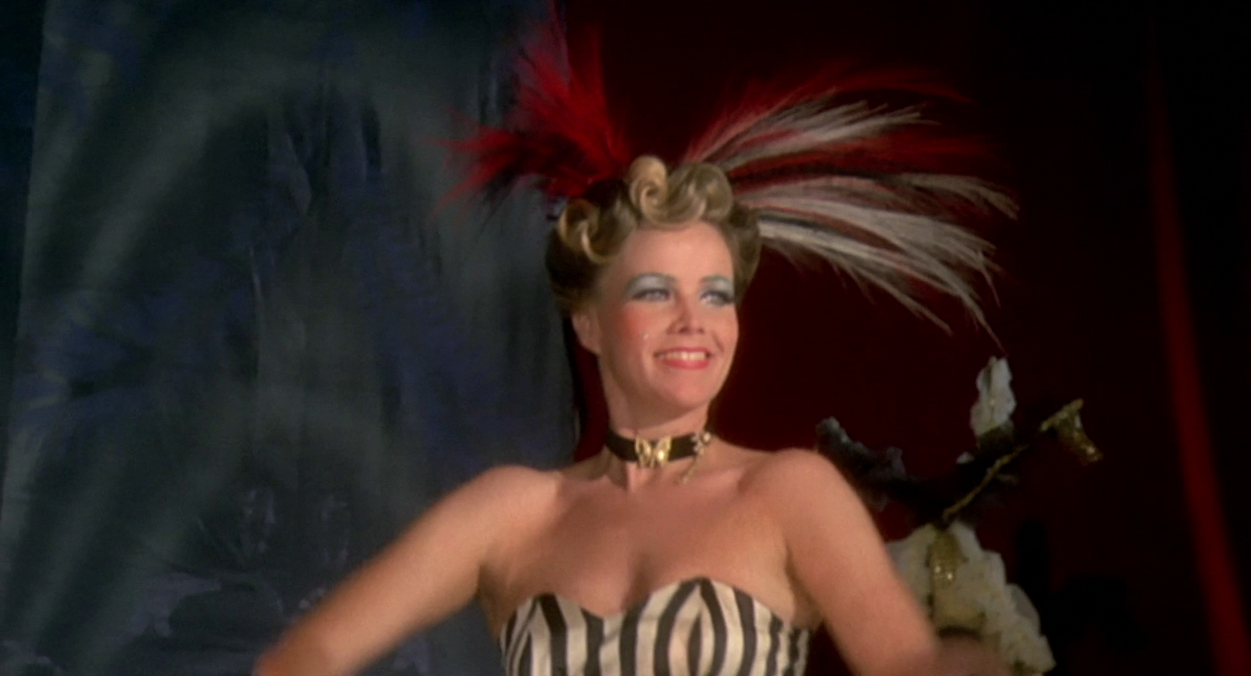
- Lindt in La cameriera (1974)
- Born: 1939 (age 86–87); Düsseldorf, Germany
- Occupations: Ballerina, film actress
- Years active: 1963 - 1979

Rosemarie Lindt is a German actress and ballet dancer who was known to the wider audience for her appearances in Frau Wirtin series in the late 1960s and in Italian exploitation cinema of the 1970s.

== Ballet career ==
Lindt studied at Folkwang University of the Arts under Kurt Jooss and performed as the prima ballerina at Opernhaus Wuppertal, Opernhaus Düsseldorf, Paris Opera, and Théâtre de la Ville.

== Film career ==
By 1963, Lindt and her boyfriend Jacques Herlin moved from Paris to Rome for Herlin's permanent employment at Cinecittà and Lindt soon found minor roles in cinema, starting with La ballata dei mariti (1963) and later Hercules the Invincible (1964). She became a regular with Herlin in Franz Antel's acclaimed series Frau Wirtin from 1967 to 1970. In the 1970s, Lindt had appeared in many Italian exploitation films including gialli, poliziotteschi and horror films before retiring from acting in 1979.

== Later career ==
Lindt moved to New York City after marrying Alfredo Piccolo and she has been operating the Lindt Ballet Theater with her husband. She also taught ballet at Hunter College.

== Selected filmography ==
- Hercules the Invincible (1964)
- Don Camillo in Moscow (1965)
- The Sweet Sins of Sexy Susan (1967)
- Sexy Susan Sins Again (1968)
- Carnal Circuit (1969)
- House of Pleasure (1969)
- Who Saw Her Die? (1972)
- Heroes in Hell (1973)
- La cameriera (1974)
- Emanuelle's Revenge (1975)
- House of Pleasure for Women (1976)
- Street People (1976)
- Salon Kitty (1976)
