= Ramona (1961 film) =

1961 film

- Directed by: Paul Martin
- Written by: Fred Ignor; Gustav Kampendonk
- Produced by: Artur Brauner; Erwin Gitt
- Starring: Senta Berger; Joachim Hansen; Ruth Stephan
- Cinematography: Richard Angst
- Edited by: Jutta Hering
- Music by: Gert Wilden
- Production companies: CCC Film; Alfa Film
- Distributed by: Gloria Film
- Release date: 22 December 1961
- Running time: 104 minutes
- Country: West Germany
- Language: German

Ramona is a 1961 West German musical film directed by Paul Martin and starring Senta Berger, Joachim Hansen and Ruth Stephan.

It was shot at the Spandau Studios in Berlin. The film's sets were designed by the art directors Paul Markwitz and Wilhelm Vorwerg.

== Cast ==
- Senta Berger as Yvonne
- Joachim Hansen as Steinberg
- Ruth Stephan as Ellinor
- Georg Thomalla as Tom Kroll
- Judith Dornys as Ramona
- Willy Hagara as Montez
- Loni Heuser as Nannen
- Edith Schollwer as Hedwig
- Ralf Wolter as Delon
- Gerold Wanke as Pepe
- Peggy Brown
- Jimmy Makulis
- Roland Kaiser as Regieassistent
- Tutte Lemkow
- Katja Lindenberg
- Sara Luzita
- Blue Diamonds as themselves
- Jan & Kjeld as themselves
- The Jochen Brauer Sextet as themselves

== Bibliography ==
- Lutz Peter Koepnick. The Cosmopolitan Screen: German Cinema and the Global Imaginary, 1945 to the Present. University of Michigan Press, 2007.
