= Sexy Susan Sins Again =

1968 film by Franz Antel

- Directed by: Franz Antel
- Written by: Kurt Nachmann; Günter Ebert; Vittoria Vigorelli
- Produced by: Carl Szokoll; Kurt Kodal; Franz Antel
- Starring: Teri Tordai; Harald Leipnitz
- Cinematography: Hanns Matula
- Music by: Gianni Ferrio
- Distributed by: Constantin Film (West Germany)
- Release dates: 1968 (Austria); 26 November 1968 (West Germany); 13 December 1968 (Italy)
- Running time: 95 minutes
- Countries: Austria; Italy
- Languages: German; Italian

Sexy Susan Sins Again (German: Frau Wirtin hat auch einen Grafen, Italian: Susanna... ed i suoi dolci vizi alla corte del re) is a 1968 Austrian-Italian costume drama-adventure-sex comedy film directed by Franz Antel. It is the first film of the series Frau Wirtin, following the 1967 film The Sweet Sins of Sexy Susan.

== Plot ==
Susanne Delberg (Teri Tordai as Terry Torday) and her friend Ferdinand (Harald Leipnitz) are assigned by Count Andrea (Béla Ernyey) to deliver some documents to his brother Enrico (Jeffrey Hunter), in order to save their family assets from Leduc (Jacques Herlin), the counsellor of Elisa Bonaparte (Pascale Petit). The duo and Susanne's prostitutes guised as an actors' troupe travel to Lucca in the Kingdom of Etruria, managing to save Enrico from an assassination attempt by Leduc and rescue him. On returning to Germany, they learn that Napoleon (Heinrich Schweiger) will meet with Elisa (accompanied by Leduc) in Giessen, Grand Duchy of Hesse and see this as a chance to settle their scores with Leduc.

== Cast ==
- Jeffrey Hunter: Count Enrico
- Harald Leipnitz: Ferdinand
- Pascale Petit: Elisa Bonaparte
- Teri Tordai: Susanne Delberg
- Jacques Herlin: Leduc
- Béla Ernyey: Count Andrea
- Gustav Knuth: Mayor of Giessen
- Hannelore Auer: Sophie
- Femi Benussi: Giovanna
- Daniela Giordano: Coralie
- Edwige Fenech: Céline
- Rosemarie Lindt: Bertha
- Judith Dornys: Dorine
- Anke Syring: Fiametta
- Franz Muxeneder: Pumpernickel
- Ralf Wolter: Bookdealer
- Heinrich Schweiger: Napoleon Bonaparte
