= The Sweet Sins of Sexy Susan =

1967 film by Franz Antel

- Directed by: Franz Antel
- Written by: Kurt Nachmann
- Produced by: Carl Szokoll; Kurt Kodal
- Starring: Teri Tordai; Harald Leipnitz
- Cinematography: Siegfried Hold
- Music by: Gianni Ferrio
- Distributed by: Variety Distribution
- Release dates: 1967 (Austria); 16 January 1968 (West Germany)
- Running time: 91 minutes
- Countries: Austria; Germany
- Language: German

The Sweet Sins of Sexy Susan (Austrian release: Susanne, die Wirtin von der Lahn, West German release: Die Wirtin von der Lahn) is a 1967 Austrian costume drama-sex comedy film directed by Franz Antel.

== Background ==
Kurt Nachmann and Franz Antel created the lead character Susanne Delberg, a courtesan-actress, later madame and eventual social climber during and after the Napoleonic Wars, with inspiration from Wirtinnenvers, a well-known profane commercium song about the exploits of an innkeeper woman from the Lahn.

== Plot ==
In the Kingdom of Westphalia, a drunken innkeeper woman (Ljuba Welitsch), just before her death, bequeaths her inn to Susanne Delberg (Teri Tordai as Terry Torday). As a result, her rival Goppelmann (Oskar Sima), who would have been first in line to inherit the inn, gets nothing. Goppelmann recruits the local Studentenverbindung to discredit Susanne's establishment. The tide turns when Susanne manages to seduce the student leader Anselmo (Mike Marshall) but through him, she finds herself in a conspiracy against the governor Dulce (Jacques Herlin) and the marching Grande Armée also involving her friend Ferdinand (Harald Leipnitz).

== Cast ==
- Teri Tordai: Susanne Delberg
- Harald Leipnitz: Ferdinand
- Pascale Petit: Caroline
- Mike Marshall: Anselmo
- Jacques Herlin: Governor Dulce
- Gunther Philipp: Wendich
- Oskar Sima: Goppelmann
- Hannelore Auer: Sophie
- Franz Muxeneder: Pumpernickel
- Judith Dornys: Dorine
- Rosemarie Lindt: Bertha
- Ljuba Welitsch: the innkeeper woman

== Frau Wirtin series ==
Although the heroine ostensibly dies at the end of the film, the commercial success of The Sweet Sins of Sexy Susan triggered the Frau Wirtin (or Sexy Susan) series of five films on later adventures of Susanne Delberg, all of them featuring Teri Tordai in the title role.

The first two films (Sexy Susan Sins Again (Frau Wirtin hat auch einen Grafen, 1968) and House of Pleasure (Frau Wirtin hat auch eine Nichte, 1969)) narrate Susanne's adventures involving Napoleon Bonaparte. The following two films (Sexy Susan Knows How...! (Frau Wirtin bläst auch gern Trompete, 1970) and The Hostess Exceeds All Bounds (Frau Wirtin treibt es jetzt noch toller, 1970)) are about Susanne's exploits in Hungary where she settles after Napoleon is deposed in 1814. The last film (The Countess Died of Laughter (Frau Wirtins tolle Töchterlein, 1973)), produced three years after the previous one was conceived as a closing chapter of Susanne's life and diverts from the earlier films of the series in several aspects, also incorporating a great deal of archive footage from earlier films.

Kurt Nachmann, the screenwriter for the series wrote and directed a film with a similar theme in 1970: Josefine Mutzenbacher based on the novel Josephine Mutzenbacher – The Life Story of a Viennese Whore, as Told by Herself.
