= Pascale Petit (actress) =

French actress

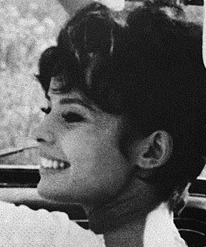
- Petit in 1960
- Born: 27 February 1938 (age 88); Paris, France
- Occupation: Actress
- Years active: 1957-2001

Pascale Petit (born Anne-Marie Pettit; 27 February 1938) is a French actress. She has appeared in more than fifty films.

== Biography ==
Working as a hairdresser, she entered films when her beauty was noticed by actress Françoise Lugagne whose husband Raymond Rouleau was searching for young actresses for his directorial debut The Crucible (1957). Petit played the role of Mary Warren.

The following year she was awarded the Prix Suzanne Bianchetti in 1958 for her role as Rosalie in One Life (1958). During the 1960s Petit appeared as the female lead in several European international co-productions such as portraying Cleopatra in the 1962 film A Queen for Caesar. Petit appeared opposite Roger Moore, Ray Danton, Jeffrey Hunter, Guy Madison and Curd Jurgens. In the 1970s and 1980s she performed a variety of roles on French Television.

== Selected filmography ==
Year	Title	Role	Director	Notes
1957	The Crucible	Mary Warren	Raymond Rouleau	
1958	One Life	Rosalie	Alexandre Astruc	
1958	Young Sinners	Mic	Marcel Carné	
1959	Women Are Weak	Agathe	Michel Boisrond	
1959	Julie the Redhead	Julie	Claude Boissol	
1960	A Mistress for the Summer	Manette	Édouard Molinaro	
1960	Vers l'extase	Catherine	René Wheeler	
1960	It Happened All Night	Christine Fiesco	Henri Verneuil	
1960	Lettere di una novizia	Margherita Passi	Alberto Lattuada	
1961	Les Démons de minuit	Daniele	Marc Allégret, Charles Gérard	
1962	No Man's Land	Giuditta	Fabrizio Taglioni	
1962	Cross of the Living	Maria	Ivan Govar	
1962	A Queen for Caesar	Cleopatra	Piero Pierotti, Victor Tourjansky	
1964	Comment épouser un premier ministre	Marion	Michel Boisrond	
1965	Code Name: Jaguar	Pilar Perez	Maurice Labro	
1966	Two Girls from the Red Star	Anja Petrovna	Sammy Drechsel	
1966	Un soir à Tibériade	Madame Pronti	Hervé Bromberger	
1966	Killer's Carnival	Lotty	Sheldon Reynolds, Robert Lynn, Alberto Cardone	
1967	Fast ein Held	Hélène	Rainer Erler	
1967	The Sweet Sins of Sexy Susan	Caroline	Franz Antel	
1968	Find a Place to Die	Lisa Martin	Giuliano Carnimeo	
1968	Sexy Susan Sins Again	Elisa Bonaparte	Franz Antel	
1968	The Last Mercenary	Maria	Mel Welles	
1970	Berlin Affair	Wendi	David Lowell Rich	TV film
1970	The Females	Miriam	Zbyněk Brynych	
1971	Chronique d'un couple	Nathalie Cantel	Roger Coggio	
1972	Boccaccio	Giletta di Narbona	Bruno Corbucci	
1972	Four Times That Night	Esmeralda	Mario Bava	
1973	The Little Cowboy	Maurice	Guido Zurli	
1975	Le dolci zie	Benedetta	Mario Imperoli	
1987	The Aggression	Ilse Trapmann	Theodor Kotulla	
