= Merkatz =

Merkatz is a surname of German-language origin. Notable people with the surname include:

- Hans-Joachim von Merkatz (1905–1982), German politician
- Karl Merkatz (1930–2022), Austrian actor
