= Casanova & Co. =

- Directed by: Franz Antel; Francois Legrand
- Written by: Tom Priman; Joshua Sinclair
- Produced by: Franz Antel; Carl Szokoll
- Starring: Tony Curtis; Jean Lefebvre; Marisa Berenson; Britt Ekland
- Cinematography: Hanns Matula
- Edited by: Michel Lewin
- Music by: Riz Ortolani
- Distributed by: PRO International Pictures (US 1979); Prima Film (Canada 1979); Monterey Home Video (US VHS 1996)
- Release date: 1 March 1977 (Italy)
- Running time: 104 minutes (Germany); 100 minutes (U.S.)
- Countries: Austria; Italy; France
- Languages: German; English (dubbed)

Casanova & Co. is a 1977 fictional period comedy film starring Tony Curtis. It had many titles during its international release. These are Casanova & Company (Italy), Casanova – sänkykamarivaras (Finland), Enas trellos, poly trellos Kazanovas (Greece), Hilfe, ich bin eine männliche Jungfrau (West Germany), Sex on the Run (United States) (reissue title), Some Like It Cool (US), The Amorous Mis-Adventures of Casanova (United States) (video title), The Rise and Rise of Casanova (United Kingdom), and Treize femmes pour Casanova (France).

The action revolves around the adventures of Giacomo Casanova with various women, and takes place during the state visit to the Republic of Venice of the Middle-Eastern entourage of a mythical Caliph of Shiraz, anomalously dominated by his sexually hungry wife, styled Calipha.

== Plot ==
While hiding from the royal authorities, Giacomo Casanova the famous romancer, encounters his look-alike: Giacomino, a fugitive petty con man. Meanwhile, the Caliph and his wife arrive in Venice for a state visit, and she insists on a night with the legendary lover. Through a series of erotic encounters and mistaken-identity comedies, Giacomo and Giacomino make their way back to Venice for their appointment with the Caliph's wife.

== Cast ==
- Tony Curtis as Giacomino/Casanova
- Jean Lefebvre as The Sergeant
- Marisa Berenson as The Caliph's Wife
- Britt Ekland as Countess Trivulzi
- Sylva Koscina as The Prefect's Wife
- Hugh Griffith as The Caliph
- Umberto Orsini as Count Tiretta
- Marisa Mell as Duchess of Cornaro
- Andréa Ferréol as The Baker's Wife
- Victor Spinetti as The Prefect
- Jenny Arasse as Cecilia
- Jacques Herlin as Senator Dell'Acqua
- Jeannie Bell as Fatme
- Lillian Müller as Beata
- Olivia Pascal as Angela
- Katia Christine as Sardella

== Differing edits ==
The initial English-language export version was prepared under the title Casanova & Company and ran 100 minutes. When released in U.S. theatres by PRO International under the titles Some Like it Cool and Sex on the Run, some trimming was performed, a brief prologue depicting the present-day Las Vegas strip of casinos with a narrator comparing the impending story's events to high-stakes gambling was added, and the credits altered to feature just the retitling and the prime star names at the beginning, with the remainder of the previous title sequence placed at the end, sandwiched between closing credit frames. This version was subsequently released on VHS by Vestron Video (under their short-lived "Wanderlust Video" sub-label), and reissued in the 90s by Monterey. When the film was reissued on DVD in 2004 as The Amorous Mis-Adventures of Casanova, the Las Vegas intro was removed, a new videoburned title was placed at the front (with a new copyright line at the bottom of the frame), and the exit music was omitted, shortening the running time further.

== Home video ==
The film was released on DVD on 5 October 2004.
