= Salvo D'Acquisto (film) =

- Directed by: Romolo Guerrieri
- Written by: Giuseppe Berto
- Starring: Massimo Ranieri
- Cinematography: Aldo Giordani
- Edited by: Antonio Siciliano
- Music by: Carlo Rustichelli
- Release date: 1974
- Language: Italian

Salvo D'Acquisto is a 1974 Italian biographical drama film directed by Romolo Guerrieri.

== Plot ==
Real life events of the Carabinieri member Salvo D'Acquisto, who during the Nazi occupation of Rome saved 22 civilians from being executed by German soldiers.

== Cast ==
- Massimo Ranieri: Salvo D'Acquisto
- Enrico Maria Salerno Rubino
- Lina Polito: Martina
- Massimo Serato: Halder
- Isa Danieli: Tatina
- Ivan Rassimov: Sgt. Krone
- Giustino Durano: Riccardo
- Mario Colli: L'ufficiale italiano
- Carla Calò: La lavandaia
- Jole Fierro: La madre superiora
- Lucretia Love
- Lorenzo Piani

== See also ==
- List of Italian films of 1974
