= Brigitte Skay =

German actress (1940–2012)

- Born: Brigitte Johanna Riedle; 18 July 1940; Mannheim, Baden, Germany
- Died: 19 November 2012 (aged 72); Weinheim, Baden-Württemberg, Germany
- Occupation: Actress
- Years active: 1963–1979

Brigitte Skay (born Brigitte Johanna Riedle; 18 July 1940 - 19 November 2012) was a German film actress.

== Career ==
Skay's foremost fame came with her lead role the Italian-West German co-production Isabella, Duchess of the Devils, followed by a number of Italian exploitation films during the 1970s.

== Filmography ==
- Heute kündigt mir mein Mann (1963) - Petra Grothum
- Unruhige Töchter (1968) - Susanne
- 24 Hour Lover (1968) - Marion
- Le 10 meraviglie dell'amore (1969) - Claudia
- Ms. Stiletto (1969) - Isabella de Frissac
- Zeta One (1969) - Lachesis
- Quando suona la campana (1969) - Dorina
- Love, Vampire Style (1970) - Dr. Stein
- L'interrogatorio (1970) - Claudia
- St. Pauli Nachrichten: Thema Nr. 1 (1971) - Georgine
- Four Times That Night (1971) - Mumu
- The Body in the Thames (1971) - Maggy McConnor
- Zu dumm zum... (1971) - Mona
- A Bay of Blood (1971) - Brunhilde
- Man of the Year (1971) - Maid
- Where the Bullets Fly (1972)
- Studio legale per una rapina (1973) - Susy
- Viaggia, ragazza, viaggia, hai la musica nelle vene (1973)
- Lo strano ricatto di una ragazza per bene (1974) - Babel
- San Babila-8 P.M. (1976) - Lalla
- La Bestia in Calore (1977) - Irene (uncredited)
- Enfantasme (1978)
