= Klausjürgen Wussow =

German actor

- Born: 30 April 1929; Cammin, Weimar Republic
- Died: 19 June 2007 (aged 78); Rüdersdorf, Germany
- Occupations: Stage actor, film actor, television actor
- Spouses: Jolande Frantz (m. 1951–1960); Ida Krottendorf (m. 1960–1991); Yvonne Viehöfer (m. 1992–2003); Sabine Scholz (m. 2004–2007) (his death)
- Children: 4

Klausjürgen Wussow (30 April 1929 – 19 June 2007) was a German stage, film and television actor.

== Early life ==
Wussow was born in Cammin, Province of Pomerania, Weimar Germany (modern Kamień Pomorski, Poland). His father was a teacher and cantor who died 1939 in the Second World War. Wussow had three brothers, an older and two younger (twins). Wussow served in the German Army in the last days of World War II. His original career choice was to become a doctor. He couldn't become a doctor as he wasn't allowed in the former East Germany. So, his new career choice was to become an actor.

== Career ==
Wussow started with the theatre. From 1964 until 1986, he was a member of the famous theatre Burgtheater in Vienna, Austria. Next to his stage work, he appeared in more than 120 film and television productions between 1958 and 2005.

Wussow was best known for his leading role as Professor Brinkmann in the ZDF medical series The Black Forest Clinic, which was one of the most successful German television series of all time. He later played another leading role as a doctor in the series Klinik unter Palmen, which ran between 1996 and 2003. In the years 2004 and 2005, the Black Forest Clinic had a new edition with two television films. In these films, he played the role of Professor Brinkmann last time, these are his last movies. He was also a writer and painter and a voice actor and announcer in radio plays and audio books. He dubbed Judge Claude Frollo in the German-language version of The Hunchback of Notre Dame (1996).

== Personal life ==
Wussow was married four times. From 1951 until 1960, he was married to German actress Jolande Frantz. They had one daughter. From 1960 until 1991, he was married to Austrian actress Ida Krottendorf. Together they had two children, a daughter and a son (both are actors too). From 1992 until 2003, he was married to the German journalist Yvonne Viehhöver. They had one son. From 2004 until 2007, he was married to Sabine Scholz, the former wife of the German boxer Bubi Scholz, marriage ended with his death. He had an Austrian honorary citizenship and an Austrian Honorary Professor.

In his last years, he was suffering from dementia after some strokes. He died in Rüdersdorf near Berlin. His grave is located in Berlin on the "Waldfriedhof Heerstrasse" cemetery.

== Selected filmography ==
- 1958: Blitzmädels an die Front - Oberleutnant Wagner
- 1959: A Doctor of Conviction - Dr. Wolfgang Friedberg
- 1960: Agatha, Stop That Murdering! - Jan Fabrizius
- 1960: The Crimson Circle - Derrick Yale
- 1960: Headquarters State Secret (Soldatensender Calais) - Jochen Malden, Kapitänleutnant
- 1960: A Woman for Life - Oberleutnant Baron Ernst Ewald von Bergen
- 1960: Final Destination: Red Lantern
- 1960: Agatha, Stop That Murdering! - Dr.Peter Brent
- 1961: The Green Archer - Inspektor James Lamotte Featherstone / Mr. Lamotte
- 1961: Judgement Day (TV film) - Thomas Hudetz
- 1961: The Last Chapter - Magnus
- 1961: Im sechsten Stock - Pierre Jonval, Student
- 1962: The Hot Port of Hong Kong - Peter Holberg
- 1964: Dead Woman from Beverly Hills - C.G.
- 1965: Bernhard Lichtenberg (TV film) - SS-Hauptsturmführer Lang
- 1966: High Season for Spies - Johansson / Bonnard
- 1967: Electra One - Klaus
- 1970–1971: Der Kurier der Kaiserin (Courier of the Empress, TV Series) - Leutnant Karl von Rotteck
- 1974: Sergeant Berry (TV Series) - Sergeant Albert Berry
- 1975: Monika and the Sixteen Year Olds - Monsignore Victor Berend
- 1975: Am Wege (TV Movie) - Huus
- 1979: Goetz von Berlichingen of the Iron Hand - Adalbert von Weislingen
- 1979-1997: Derrick (TV Series) - Gregor Lenau / Jakob Bienert / Hugo Zeller / Dr. Blunk / Martin Gericke / Bernhard Demmler
- 1981: Der Bockerer - Obersturmbannführer von Lamm
- 1983: Vom Webstuhl zur Weltmacht (TV Series)
- 1986: Nägel mit Köpfen - Falscher Graf
- 1985–1989: The Black Forest Clinic (TV Series) - Prof. Klaus Brinkmann
- 1986: Please, Let the Flowers Live - Charles Duhamel / Peter Kent
- 1992: Die Sonne über dem Dschungel
- 1994: Venti dal Sud - Rudi
- 1996–2003: Klinik unter Palmen (TV Series) - Dr. Frank Hofmann
- 1997: The Fearless Four - Der Erzähler (voice)
- 2004: Die Schwarzwaldklinik – Die nächste Generation (The Black Forest Clinic – The Next Generation) (TV Movie) - Prof. em. Klaus Brinkmann
- 2005: Die Schwarzwaldklinik – Neue Zeiten (The Black Forest Clinic – New Times) (TV Movie) - Prof. em. Klaus Brinkmann (final film role)
