= It Happened All Night =

- Affaire d'une nuit
- Directed by: Henri Verneuil
- Written by: Jean Aurenche; Henri Jeanson
- Produced by: Christine Gouze-Renal
- Starring: Pascale Petit; Roger Hanin; Pierre Mondy
- Cinematography: Robert Lefebvre
- Edited by: Léonide Azar
- Music by: Martial Solal
- Production company: PROGEFI - Production Générale de Films
- Distributed by: Pathé Consortium Cinéma
- Release date: 14 September 1960 (France)
- Running time: 95 minutes
- Country: France
- Language: French

It Happened All Night (in French: Affaire d'une nuit) is a 1960 French film directed by Henri Verneuil, starring Pascale Petit, Roger Hanin, Pierre Mondy and with the participation of Brigitte Bardot.

== Cast ==
- Pascale Petit : Christine Fiesco
- Roger Hanin : Michel Ferréol
- Pierre Mondy : Antoine Fiesco
- Robert Dalban : Lenormand
- Gabriel Gobin : Sergeant
- Émile Genevois : drunkard
- Micheline Luccioni : Mireille Luccioni
- Bernard Musson : pharmacist
- Claude Piéplu : salesman
- Gisèle Préville : Madame Lenormand
- Brigitte Bardot : a woman in the restaurant (uncredited)
- Jacques Charrier : a man in the restaurant (uncredited)
- Henri Verneuil : a man in the restaurant (uncredited)
- Christine Gouze-Rénal : a woman in the restaurant (uncredited)
- Guy Henry : librarian (uncredited)
- Félix Marten : a man in the restaurant (uncredited)
- Darío Moreno : himself (uncredited)
