= Daniela Giordano =

Italian actress (1946–2022)

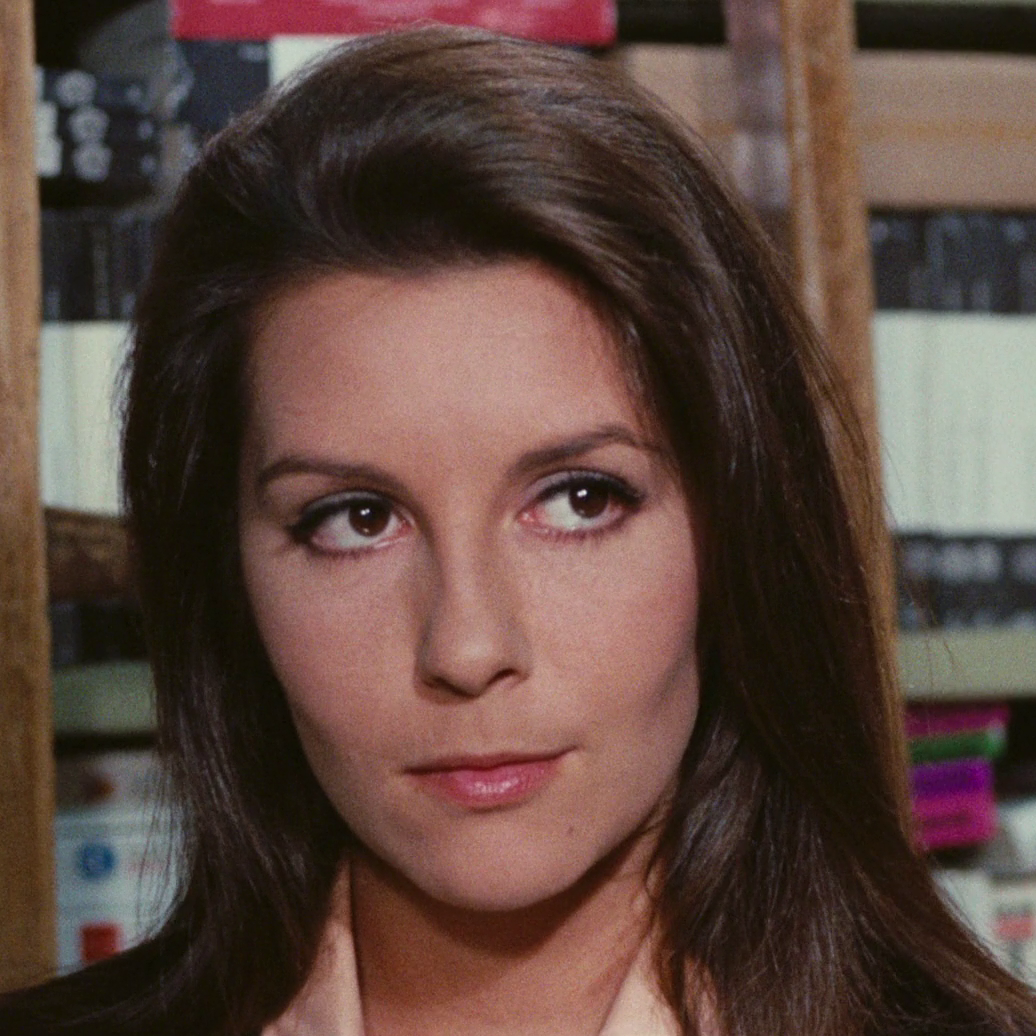
- Giordano in Your Vice Is a Locked Room and Only I Have the Key (1972)
- Born: 7 November 1947; Palermo, Italy
- Died: 16 December 2022 (aged 75); Palermo, Italy
- Occupations: Film actress; photomodel
- Years active: 1967–1980

Daniela Giordano (7 November 1947– 16 December 2022) was an Italian actress, who is foremost known for her appearances in the Italian exploitation cinema in the late 1960s and in the 1970s. She is not to be confused with the stage actress and director of the same name.

== Miss Italia ==
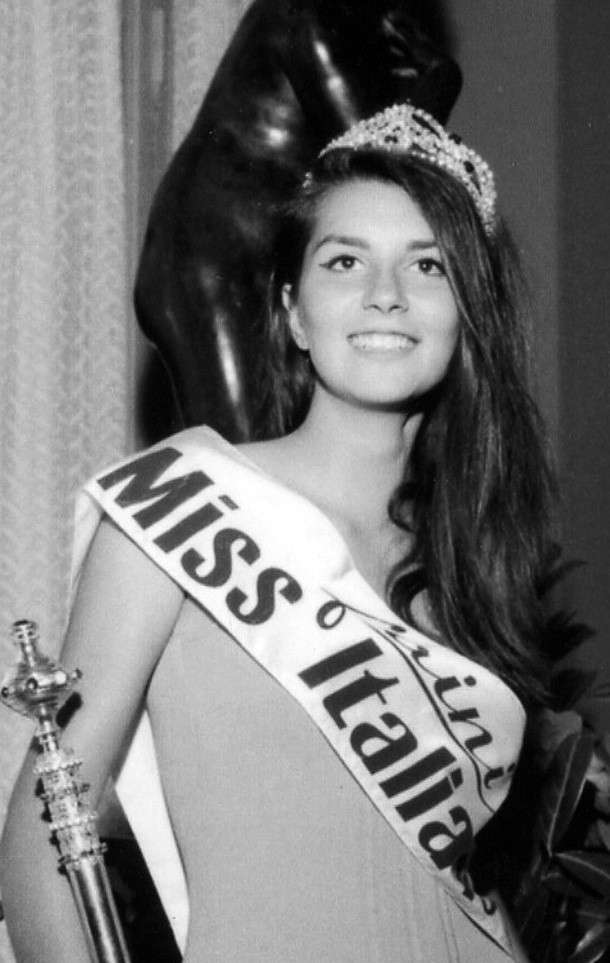
Giordano Miss Italia 1966

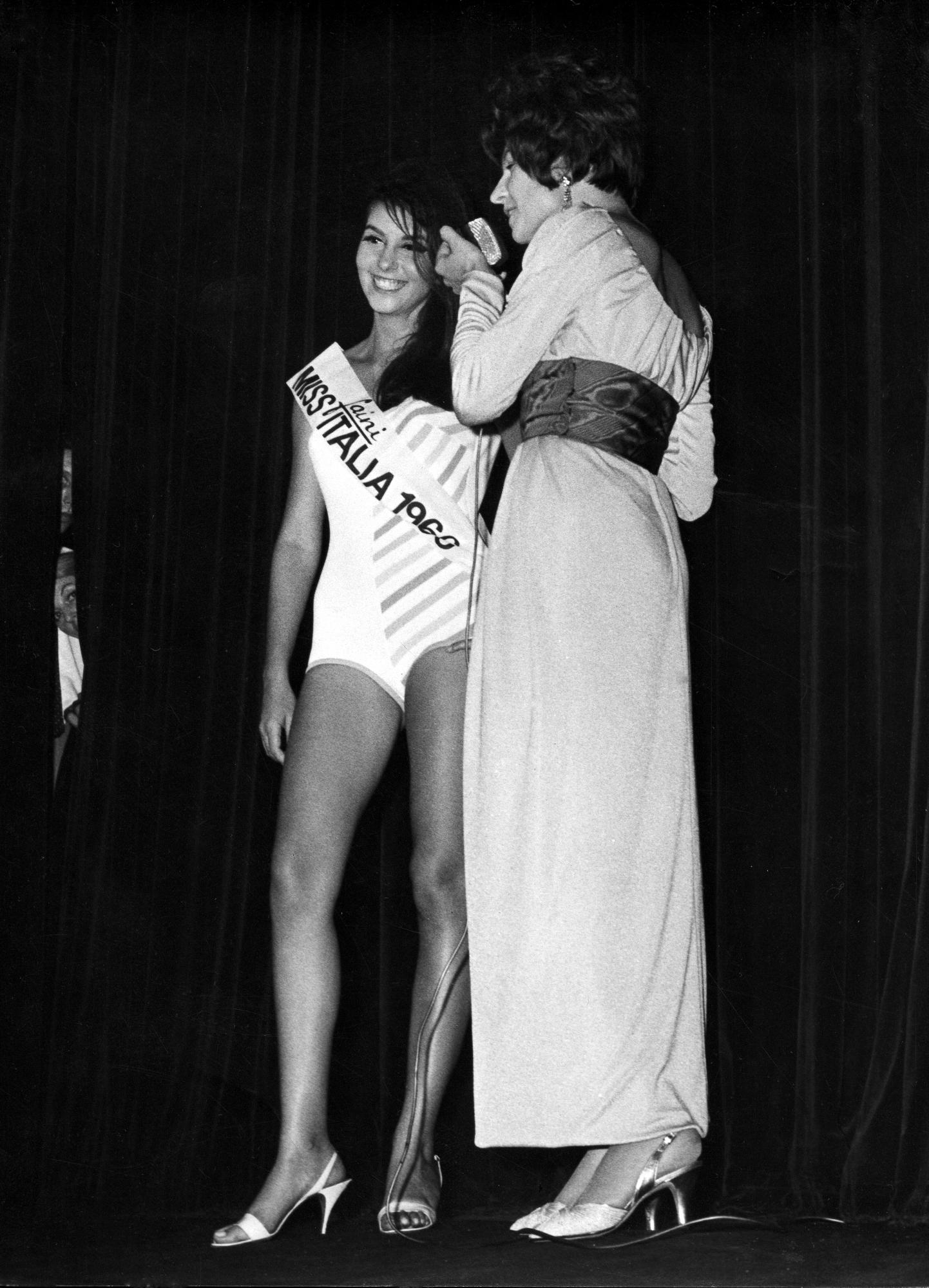
Daniela Giordano Miss Italia 1966

Daniela Giordano was the winner of local beauty pageants in her hometown Palermo and by the year 1966, as Miss Sicily, won the Miss Italia contest. She was in the second place at the Miss Europe contest in 1967.

== Film career ==
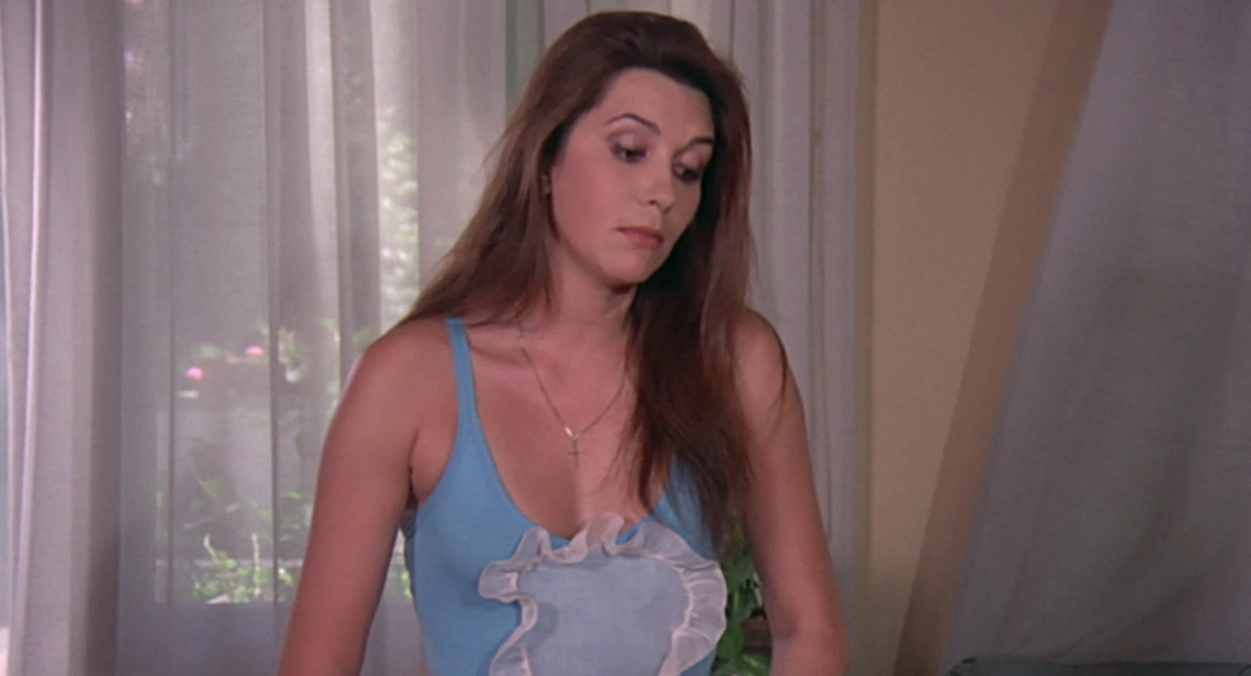
Giordano in La cameriera (1974)

Giordano made her cinema debut in 1967 with the Franco and Ciccio film I barbieri di Sicilia by Marcello Ciorciolini. She had been active in a plethora of genres including commedia all'italiana, commedia sexy all'italiana, poliziottesco, and Spaghetti Western. Giordano retired from cinema by 1980, temporarily ending her career with Secrets d'adolescentes by Gérard Loubeau, featuring French porn star Brigitte Lahaie. Giordano returned to acting in 2015 with roles in Luciano Imperoli's Help Me Have No Human Ways and Valentina Gebbia's Erba Celeste.

== Selected filmography ==
- I barbieri di Sicilia (1967)
- Sexy Susan Sins Again (1968)
- Find a Place to Die (1968)
- I See Naked (1969)
- Have a Good Funeral, My Friend... Sartana Will Pay (1970)
- Four Times That Night (1971)
- Bloody Friday (1972)
- Your Vice Is a Locked Room and Only I Have the Key (1972)
- La cameriera (1974)
- Violent Rome (1975)
- Il fidanzamento (1975)
- Reflections in Black (1975)
- L'adolescente (1976)
- Inquisition (1976)
- La portiera nuda (1976)
- Kara Murat Şeyh Gaffar'a Karşı (1976)
- Batton Story (1976)
- Help Me Have No Human Ways (2015)
- Erba Celeste (2015)
