= Rosemary's Daughter =

1976 film by Rolf Thiele

- German: Rosemaries Tochter
- Directed by: Rolf Thiele
- Written by: Joe Berger; Friedhelm Lehmann; Ted Rose; Helmut Ruge
- Produced by: Luggi Waldleitner; Dieter Graber
- Starring: Lillian Müller; Béla Ernyey; Werner Pochath
- Cinematography: Charly Steinberger
- Edited by: Ingrid Bichler
- Music by: Norbert Schultze; Kristian Schultze
- Production company: Roxy Film
- Distributed by: Constantin Film
- Release date: 19 November 1976
- Running time: 92 minutes
- Country: West Germany
- Language: German

Rosemary's Daughter (German: Rosemaries Tochter) is a 1976 West German sex comedy film directed by Rolf Thiele and starring Lillian Müller, Béla Ernyey, and Werner Pochath. It is based on the story of Rosemarie Nitribitt, which Thiele had already treated more seriously in the 1958 drama Rosemary.

== Cast ==
- Lillian Müller as Annemarie Nitribitt
- Béla Ernyey as John
- Werner Pochath as Horst
- Hanne Wieder as Hanne
- Tamara Lund as Lena
- Herbert Fux as Vokurka
- Silvia Simon as Karin
- Jo Herbst as Joe
- Karl Schönböck as Hans Winkler
- Walter Ullrich as CDU-Mitglied
- Tilo von Berlepsch as Fürst
- Paul Friedrichs
- Ernst Lothar as SPD-Mitglied
- Gerd Rigauer as FDP-Mitglied
- Georg-Simon Schiller as CSU-Mitglied
- Horst Frank as Heinrich "Mario" Schmitz
- Hans Clarin as Erzähler
- Werner Abrolat as Polizist mit Megaphon
- Fred Berhoff
- Helmut Brasch as Dr. Schreier
- Claus Fuchs as concierge
- Michael Gahr as policeman, bei Einbruch
- Walter Gnilka
- Klaus Guth as scientist
- Ralf Morell
- Wolf Petersen
- Ursula Reit as Head of Boarding School
- Harald Schreiber
- Hertha von Walther
- Günter von Wyhl as Siegfried
