= Mario Colli =

Italian actor and voice actor

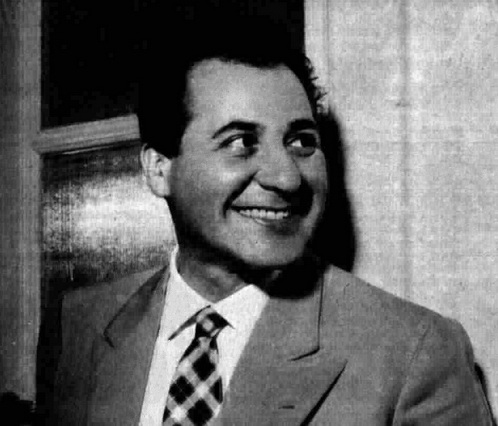
- Colli in 1960.
- Born: Mario Delli Colli; 7 July 1915; Rome, Italy
- Died: 29 November 1989 (aged 74); Rome, Italy
- Occupations: Actor, voice actor, dubbing director
- Years active: 1932–1989

Mario Delli Colli (7 July 1915 – 29 November 1989) was an Italian actor and voice actor. He also worked as a voice actor, dubbing foreign films for release in Italy.

== Selected filmography ==
- Five to Nil (1932)
- The Amnesiac (1936)
- Abandon All Hope (1937)
- The Priest's Hat (1944)
- I cinque dell'Adamello (1954)
- The Violent Patriot (1956)
- The Mongols (1961)
- I Kill, You Kill (1965)
- Salvo D'Acquisto (1974)
- La cameriera (1974)
- Erotomania (1974)

== Bibliography ==
- Pitts, Michael R. Western Movies: A Guide to 5,105 Feature Films. McFarland, 2012.
