= Ida Krottendorf =

Austrian actress

- Born: 5 April 1927; Ebreichsdorf, Austria
- Died: 23 June 1998 (aged 71); Vienna, Austria

Ida Krottendorf (5 April 1927, in Ebreichsdorf – 23 June 1998, in Vienna) was an Austrian actress. She was married from 1955 to Austrian actor Ernst Stankovski and in the second marriage from 1960 until 1991 to Klausjürgen Wussow. Together they had two children, Barbara and Alexander Wussow.

== Selected filmography ==
- Kleiner Peter, große Sorgen (1950)
- No Sin on the Alpine Pastures (1950)
- Gateway to Peace (1951)
- On the Green Meadow (1953)
- Consul Strotthoff (1954)
- Wedding Bells (1954)
- Mamitschka (1955)
- The Song of Kaprun (1955)
- Liebe, Jazz und Übermut (1957)
- 4 Schlüssel (1965)
- Das ausgefüllte Leben des Alexander Dubronski (1967)
- Der Kommissar – Parkplatz-Hyänen (1970)
- Der Kommissar - Der Tod von Karin W. (1973)
- Derrick - Season 04, Episode 05: "Tod des Wucherers" (1977)
- Tatort - Mord im Krankenhaus (1978)
- Love Hotel in Tyrol (1978)
- Derrick - Season 07, Episode 04: "Tödliche Sekunden" (1980)
- Der Bockerer (1981) (directed by Franz Antel)
- Derrick - Season 09, Episode 04: "Ein Fall für Harry" (1982)
- Derrick - Season 10, Episode 08: "Attentat auf Derrick" (1983)
- Why Is There Salt in the Sea? (1988) (based on Brigitte Schwaiger's novel)
- Die Kaffeehaus-Clique (1990)
- Der Unfisch (1997)
- Baby Rex (1998)
