= Why Did I Ever Say Yes Twice? =

1969 film

- Directed by: Franz Antel
- Written by: Vittoria Vigorelli; Kurt Nachmann
- Starring: Lando Buzzanca; Teri Tordai
- Cinematography: Hanns Matula
- Music by: Gianni Ferrio
- Release date: 1969
- Languages: German; Italian

Why Did I Ever Say Yes Twice? (German: Warum hab ich bloß 2 x ja gesagt?, Italian: Professione bigamo) is a 1969 German-Italian comedy film directed by Franz Antel and starring Lando Buzzanca, Teri Tordai and Raffaella Carrà. It is also known as The Viking Who Became a Bigamist.

== Plot ==
A railway worker has two wives, one in Munich and the other in Rome.

== Main cast ==
- Lando Buzzanca as Vittorio Coppa
- Teri Tordai as Ingrid
- Raffaella Carrà as Teresa
- Peter Weck as Von Weiland
- Ann Smyrner as Püppi
- Jacques Herlin as Dr. Pellegrini
- Andrea Rau as Marisa
- Fritz Muliar as Johann
- Rainer Basedow as Alex
- Franco Giacobini as Roberto
- Gert Wiedenhofen as Cesare
- Heinz Erhardt as Weichbrodt
- Willy Millowitsch as Mauro Carlotti
