= Four Times That Night =

1971 film by Mario Bava

- American film poster
- Directed by: Mario Bava
- Screenplay by: Mario Moroni; Charles Ross; Dialogue: Guido Leoni
- Produced by: Zeljko Kunkera; Claudio Rainis
- Starring: Brett Halsey; Daniela Giordano; Pascale Petit; Brigitte Skay
- Cinematography: Antonio Rinaldi; Mario Bava
- Edited by: Otello Colangeli
- Music by: Lallo Gori
- Color process: Eastmancolor
- Production companies: Delfino Film; Hape-Film; Arlington International Pictures
- Distributed by: Alexa Cinematografica (Italy); Cinevision Films (US)
- Release dates: 12 March 1971 (Montreal); 15 July 1972 (Italy)
- Running time: 81 minutes (Italy); 83 minutes (US)
- Countries: Italy; West Germany; United States
- Languages: English; Italian

Four Times That Night (Italian: Quante volte... quella notte, lit. 'How many times... that night') is a 1971 commedia sexy all'italiana film directed by Mario Bava.

== Plot ==
Male model John Price encounters Tina Bryant while walking her poodle, "Cool Rump", in a park. Although she initially resists his advances, they flirt after John accidentally trips over the dog, and agree to a date that evening. While picking her up, John is cautioned by Tina's strict, widowed mother Sonia that her daughter is a Catholic and a virgin, and is not to be taken advantage of. After dancing at a discoteque, Tina becomes uncomfortable with John's insistent leering, and the pair agree to return home.

Early next morning, Tina returns to her mother's apartment with her expensive mini-dress torn beyond repair. When Sonia questions her, Tina declares that John tried to rape her.

=== Tina's story ===
On their way home, John invited Tina back to his apartment as he was expecting a business call. She opted to wait outside, but after being teased by two gay neighbours, George and Esmeralda, she decided to go into the apartment, a stereotypical swinger's pad. John left the room to change into a sweater, but returned in his underwear and attempted to mount Tina; during the altercation, he tore through the dress and she scratched his forehead in self-defence. After barricading herself in the bedroom, she escaped.

=== John's story ===
John returns to the discoteque and drinks with three of his friends. Their curiosities are piqued by his forehead injury, prompting him to share his side of the story.

In his recollection, both Sonia and Tina were unrelentingly coquettish towards him, and the latter was more than willing to return to his apartment. The pair had sex multiple times throughout the night, and Tina's libidinousness eventually tired John; she unwittingly scratched him while stroking his hair. Tina's chance for another tryst was lost when they were visited by George and Esmeralda, forcing them to end their date with light conversation.

=== The Doorman's story ===
As John returns home, his sex-crazed, voyeuristic doorman converses with a milkman, claiming to have watched the encounter through binoculars.

John had brought Tina home to provide Esmerelda with company while he and George had sex in his bedroom. To dissuade Tina's disbelief about John's homosexuality, Esmeralda told her of how they met at the Club Kama Sutra, which turned out to be a story of how she convinced a German woman to pose for nude photographs. When Tina reacted in shock to John and George's lovemaking, Esmeralda drugged her drink, rendering her unconscious, and raped her. When Tina awoke and tried to escape, her dress was torn as she tried to retrieve it from John, who she scratched as he held her down for Esmeralda to take advantage of again.

=== The Scientist's story ===
After presenting a lecture on perception, a scientist proposes a fourth version of the story.

Here, John and Tina's initial encounter and date were friendly and without conflict. John suggested that they share a drink at his apartment, offering to keep his door open as a sign of trust. There, both admitted their mutual attraction, but decided that they would share intimacy once they knew each other better. As John and Tina left, they discovered that the front gate was jammed; their attempts to call for the doorman were fruitless due to him being distracted by his pornography collection. John tried to lift Tina over the gate so she could unlock it from the outside, but her dress got torn on the gate, and she scratched his forehead after she nearly fell to the ground; when Tina worried about how Sonia would respond to the torn dress, John jokingly suggested that she tell her that he tried to rape her. They then waited until another occupant was able to let them out. Upon George and Esmerelda's arrival, the doorman arrived to fix the gate, and John and Tina drove away.

The scientist is dissatisfied with this apparently "true" account, and questions the logic of the "open door" policy, as well as the couple's response to the jammed gate. Suggesting that the truth is hidden amid the embellishments and falsehoods provided by these four accounts, he reveals that the only fact he is certain of is that rather than immediately returning to Sonia's, the couple drove to the seaside to watch the sunrise together.

== Cast ==
- Daniela Giordano as Tina Bryant
- Brett Halsey as John Price (Gianni Prada in the Italian version)
- Pascale Petit as Esmeralda
- Robert H. Oliver as George (Giorgio)
- Dick Randall as The Doorman
- Valeria Sabel as Mrs. Sonia Bryant
- Rainer Basedow as Jack Halaby (Lorenzo)
- Brigitte Skay as Mumu
- Calisto Calisti as The Scientist

== Release ==
Four Times That Night was shown in Montreal on March 12, 1971.
