= Io e il re =

- Directed by: Lucio Gaudino
- Written by: Lucio Gaudino, Ivan Orano, Claver Salizzato
- Story by: Lucio Gaudino, Ivan Orano
- Produced by: Antonio Avati
- Starring: Laura Morante, Franco Nero, Carlo Delle Piane, Carla Calò
- Cinematography: Cesare Bastelli
- Edited by: Amedeo Salfa
- Music by: Antonio Di Pofi
- Release date: 1995
- Country: Italy
- Language: Italian

Io e il re (The King and Me) is a 1995 Italian historical comedy drama film written and directed by Lucio Gaudino. It entered the Italian Panorama section at the 52nd Venice International Film Festival.

== Cast ==
- Laura Morante as Beatrice
- Franco Nero as Major Ferri
- Carlo Delle Piane as Victor Emmanuel III of Italy
- Carla Calò as Elena of Montenegro
- Philippe Leroy as Il Conte
- Azzurra Fiume Garelli as Matilde
- Maria Monsè as Maria
- Nina Soldano
