= Judith Dornys =

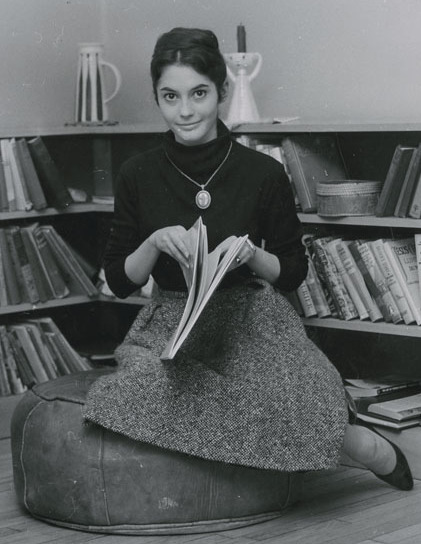
- Dornys at her home in Toronto, Ontario, Canada
- Born: 21 February 1941; Budapest, Hungary
- Died: 26 April 1989 (aged 48); Paris, France
- Occupations: Actress; dancer
- Years active: 1960–1969

Judith Dornys (21 February 1941 – 26 April 1989) was a Hungarian-Canadian actress and dancer.

Dornys died on 26 April 1989, at the age of 48.

== Selected filmography ==
- Ramona (1961)
- The Curse of the Hidden Vault (1964)
- The Inn on Dartmoor (1964)
- Call of the Forest (1965)
- The Sweet Sins of Sexy Susan (1967)
- Sexy Susan Sins Again (1968)
- House of Pleasure (1969)

== Bibliography ==
- Bergfelder, Tim. International Adventures: German Popular Cinema and European Co-Productions in the 1960s. Berghahn Books, 2005.
