= La cameriera =

1974 film

- Directed by: Roberto Bianchi Montero
- Screenplay by: Roberto Bianchi Montero
- Starring: Daniela Giordano; Mario Colli
- Cinematography: Mario Mancini
- Edited by: Carlo Reali
- Music by: Alberto Baldan Bembo
- Release date: 1974
- Country: Italy
- Language: Italian

La cameriera ('The maid') is a 1974 commedia sexy all'italiana film written and directed by Roberto Bianchi Montero and starring Daniela Giordano.

== Cast ==
- Daniela Giordano as Marietta Lorenzon
- Mario Colli as Baron Ruggero Petralia
- Carla Calò as Rosalia Calamarà
- Enzo Monteduro as Massimino Petralia
- Anna Melita as Cristina Petralia
- Rosemarie Lindt as Yvette
- Annamaria Tornello as Concettina 'Connie' Calamarà
- Giacomo Furia as the Doctor

== Production ==
The film was produced by Nais Film. Montero filmed it back to back with Calore in provincia. The film was shot in the 1974 in various Apulia locations around Lecce, including Gallipoli, Taurisano, and Diso, with interns shot in Villa Franite in Maglie.

== Release ==
The film was distributed in Italian cinemas by Seven Arts starting from 24 December 1974.

== Reception ==
The film grossed about 180 million lire. Corriere della Sera film critic Maurizio Porro wrote: 'Montero directed with such disregard for logic and good taste that one is left a little stunned', and noted: 'the screenplay reaches such an advanced and sublime state of inadequacy that it would be inappropriate to dwell on it'.
