= Carla Calò =

Italian actress (1926–2019)

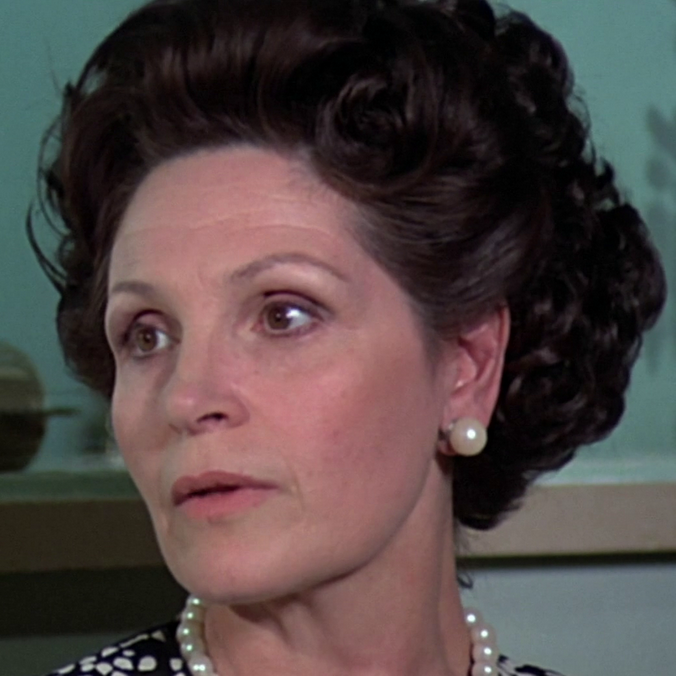
- Calò in La cameriera (1974)
- Born: 21 September 1926; Palermo, Kingdom of Italy
- Died: 29 December 2019 (aged 93); Forano, Rieti, Italy
- Other name: Carrol Brown
- Occupation: Actress

Carla Calò (21 September 1926 – 29 December 2019) was an Italian actress.

== Life and career ==
Born in Palermo, Calò started her career on stage, notably starring in Luigi Squarzina's Il berretto a sonagli, and also being active in dialectal theatre and avanspettacolo. She made her film debut in 1949, in Carlo Ludovico Bragaglia's Il falco rosso. During the early part of her film career Calò played several main roles, then, from the second half of the 1950s, she became one of the most active character actresses in Italian cinema. She was sometimes credited as Carrol Brown.

Calò died in December 2019 at the age of 93.

== Selected filmography ==
- Il falco rosso (1949) - Marfa
- Totò Le Mokò (1949) - Suleima
- The Iron Swordsman (1949) - Haidée
- The Fighting Men (1950) - Rosa
- The Treasure of Bengal (1953) - Surama
- La pattuglia dell'Amba Alagi (1953) - Elena
- Mystery of the Black Jungle (1954) - Sulima
- La vendetta dei Tughs (1954) - Sulima
- Madonna delle rose (1954)
- Il cantante misterioso (1955) - Olga
- Suonno d'ammore (1955) - Carmen De Blasi
- Sultana Safiyè (1955)
- La ladra (1955) - Gemma
- Una sera di maggio (1955) - His Secretary
- Vendicata! (1956)
- Il canto dell'emigrante (1956)
- Cantando sotto le stelle (1956) - Moglie di A. Pezzetti 2°
- Sette canzoni per sette sorelle (1957) - Signorina Paoletti
- La canzone più bella (1957)
- A vent'anni è sempre festa (1957)
- Il romanzo di un giovane povero (1958)
- Captain Falcon (1958) - Teresa
- Ritrovarsi all'alba (1959)
- Quel tesoro di papà (1959) - Adelaide
- Goliath and the Barbarians (1959) - Bruno's Mother
- Due selvaggi a corte (1959)
- Agosto, donne mie non vi conosco (1959)
- Spavaldi e innamorati (1959)
- Goliath and the Dragon (1960) - La Sibilla
- Fury of the Pagans (1960)
- The Last of the Vikings (1961) - Herta
- Spade senza bandiera (1961)
- Revolt of the Mercenaries (1961) - Miriam du Marchant
- 5 marines per 100 ragazze (1961) - Una professoressa
- Triumph of the Son of Hercules (1961) - Yalis - the Oracle
- Revenge of the Conquered (1961)
- Gerarchi si muore (1961) - Tatiana Merletti
- Roaring Years (1962)
- Zorro alla corte di Spagna (1962) - Francisca Di Villa Verde
- Caesar the Conqueror (1962) - Calpurnia
- Musketeers of the Sea (1962) - Zalamea
- Roaring Years (1962) - Bibiana
- Avventura al motel (1963) - Elvira
- The Eye of the Needle (1963) - Elisabetta
- The Magnificent Adventurer (1963) - Zia di Angela
- Il terrore dei mantelli rossi (1963)
- Brennus, Enemy of Rome (1963) - High Priestess
- D'Artagnan contro i 3 moschettieri (1963)
- Bebo's Girl (1964) - Mara's Mother
- FBI chiama Istanbul (1964) - Laura Basento
- Hercules the Invincible (1964) - Queen Etel
- Terror in the Crypt (1964) - Ljuba's Mother
- Le sette vipere (Il marito latino) (1964)
- Oh! Those Most Secret Agents! (1964) - Russian Spy Chief
- Ali Baba and the Seven Saracens (1964) - Farida, Omar's lover
- Bullets and the Flesh (1964) - Master's Maid
- I magnifici brutos del West (1964)
- Vengeance of the Vikings (1965) - Freiodis - Erik's Mother
- Secret Agent Fireball (1965) - Jane Cartland
- Veneri in collegio (1965)
- The Double Bed (1965) - Mother
- Operation Poker (1965) - Russian Agent
- The Tramplers (1965) - Mrs. Temple Cordeen
- Mondo pazzo... gente matta! (1966) - Butcher's Wife
- Agent 505: Death Trap in Beirut (1966) - Boss
- Killer's Carnival (1966) - Female boss (Rome segment)
- L'affare Beckett (1966) - Nadia
- One Thousand Dollars on the Black (1966) - Rhonda
- Hello Glen Ward, House Dick (1968) - Mrs. Parker
- Better a Widow (1968) - Rosa's governess
- Taste of Vengeance (1968) - Mother Douglas
- The Seven Red Berets (1969)
- Poppea's Hot Nights (1969) - Calpurnia
- Erika (1971) - Concettina
- No Way Out (1973) - Arzenta's Mother
- Anna, quel particolare piacere (1973) - Anna's mother
- La cameriera (1974) - Rosalia / Don Gaetano's wife
- Salvo D'Acquisto (1974) - Laundress
- La cameriera (1974) - Rosalia Calamarà
- La encadenada (1975) - Mother Superior
- Una vergine in famiglia (1975) - Francesca Vicini
- The Flower in His Mouth (1975)
- Calore in provincia (1975) - Nena
- Campagnola bella (1976)
- La cameriera nera (1976) - Eleonora
- Submission (1976) - Carmen
- La sorprendente eredità del tontodimammà (1977)
- Towards Evening (1990)
- Io e il re (1995)
- Voglio stare sotto al letto (1999)
