= Heinrich Kodré =

Austrian military officer (1899–1977)

- Born: 8 August 1899; Vienna, Austria-Hungary
- Died: 22 May 1977 (aged 77); Linz, Austria
- Military career
- Allegiance: Nazi Germany; German resistance; Austrian resistance
- Branch: Heer
- Rank: Colonel
- Conflicts: World War II
- Awards: Knight's Cross of the Iron Cross

Heinrich Kodré (8 August 1899 - 22 May 1977) was an Austrian military officer, Knight's Cross recipients and resistance fighter. As chief of the general staff in military district XVII, Vienna, he set off the Operation Valkyrie on 20 July 1944, massively exceeding his powers, which was strictly reserved for the respective commander in the military district, but by no means a right of the chiefs of staff. Together with Captain Carl Szokoll and Colonel Rudolf von Marogna-Redwitz, he then successfully carried out “Walküre”, which otherwise only succeeded in Paris.

== Early life ==
Kodré was born in 1899 to Richard Kodré and his French wife Henriette Crochet. His father came from Trieste and was a department head in the Emperor Ferdinand Northern Railway. His uncle, Franz Kodré, was the director of the Justizanstalt Stein and was shot dead on 6 April 1945 by members of the Wehrmacht and the Waffen SS as part of an end-stage crime because he had allegedly unlawfully released several hundred political prisoners.

== Awards and decorations ==
- Knight's Cross of the Iron Cross on 14 May 1941 as Major and Commander of the II./Infanterie-Regiment 123
