= Love Hotel in Tyrol =

1978 film

- German film poster
- German: Love-Hotel in Tirol
- Directed by: Franz Antel
- Written by: Hans J. Haller
- Produced by: Franz Antel
- Starring: Erich Padalewski; Teri Tordai; Fritz Muliar
- Cinematography: Franz Xaver Lederle
- Edited by: Tamara Epp
- Music by: Gerhard Heinz
- Production companies: CA-Film; Lisa Film; Neue Delta Filmproduktion
- Distributed by: Residenz Film
- Release date: 13 October 1978
- Running time: 91 minutes
- Countries: Austria; West Germany
- Language: German

Love Hotel in Tyrol (German: Love-Hotel in Tirol) is a 1978 Austrian-West German sex comedy film directed by Franz Antel and starring Erich Padalewski, Teri Tordai and Fritz Muliar.

== Cast ==
- Erich Padalewski as Peter Berger / Paul Berger
- Teri Tordai as Caroline
- Fritz Muliar as mayor Katzinger
- Ida Krottendorf as Wally Katzinger
- Iris Lohner as Susi Berg
- Heinz Reincke as prosecutor
- Rolf Olsen as Father Zwickauer
- Anna Marcella as Antje
- Marianne Chappuis as Rübenzahls Sekretärin
- Marianne Haas as Burgl
- Marte Harell as Sister Angelika
- Werner Röglin as André
- Victor Couzyn
- Elisabeth Stiepl as Olga Rübenzahl
- Gerti Schneider as Rosl
- Uschi Zech as Christa
- Rinaldo Talamonti as Peppino
- Jacques Herlin as Armin Rübenzahl
- Renate Langer as convent participant
- Claudia Mehringer as convent participant
