= No Man's Land (1962 film) =

- Poster
- Directed by: Fabrizio Taglioni
- Starring: Roger Moore; Pascale Petit
- Release date: 1962
- Countries: Italy; France
- Language: Italian

No Man's Land (it. Un branco di vigliacchi/Fr. Bande de lâches; lit. A Bunch of Cowards) is a black-and-white 1962 Italian-French war film directed by Fabrizio Taglioni, and starring Roger Moore and Pascale Petit.

The film was written by Taglioni and produced by Enrico Bomba.

== Release ==
The film was released in Italy in 1962 and in 1963 in France.

== Production ==
In his autobiography, Moore explains about his role in the 1961 film Romulus and the Sabines: "Eventually I did get paid but only, I suspect, because Bomba wanted to offer me a second picture, No Man's Land."

== Reception ==
The film received the award for the Best foreign film at the Moscow Film Festival in 1963.

An Italian contemporary review recalls that the story is loosely based on Maupassant's "Boule de Suif'.
