= House of Pleasure (1969 film) =

- Directed by: Franz Antel
- Written by: Günter Ebert; Kurt Nachmann; Vittoria Vigorelli
- Produced by: Franz Antel; Carl Szokoll
- Starring: Teri Tordai; Claudio Brook; Margaret Lee
- Cinematography: Hanns Matula
- Edited by: Luciano Anconetani
- Music by: Gianni Ferrio
- Production companies: Aico Film; Hungaro; Neue Delta; Sargon Film; Terra-Filmkunst
- Distributed by: Variety Distribution
- Release date: 16 April 1969
- Running time: 98 minutes
- Countries: Austria; Hungary; Italy; West Germany
- Language: German

House of Pleasure (German: Frau Wirtin hat auch eine Nichte, Italian: Il trionfo della casta Susanna) is a 1969 historical comedy film directed by Franz Antel and starring Teri Tordai, Claudio Brook and Margaret Lee. It is the third in the series of films which began with The Sweet Sins of Sexy Susan (1967).

== Cast ==
- Teri Tordai as Wirtin von der Lahn / Sexy Susan / Susanne Delberg
- Claudio Brook as Baron von Ambras
- Margaret Lee as Pauline Borghese
- Karl Michael Vogler as Prince Borghese
- Harald Leipnitz as Ferdinand
- Jacques Herlin as Ambassador Bulakieff
- Heinrich Schweiger as Napoleon Bonaparte
- Ralf Wolter as Waltchmaker Bobinet
- Lando Buzzanca as Conte Lombardini
- Edwige Fenech as Rosalie Bobinet
- Rosemarie Lindt as Bertha
- Judith Dornys as Dorine
- Grit Freyberg
- Sissy Löwinger as Serafine
- Annamária Szilvássy as Agathe
- Erich Nikowitz as Waldeshain
- Franz Muxeneder as Pumpernickel
- Erich Padalewski as Officer
- Guido Wieland
- Éva Vadnai as Babushka
- György Máday as Fuchsel
- Eva Vodickova as Denise

== Bibliography ==
- Robert Von Dassanowsky. Austrian Cinema: A History. McFarland, 2005.
