= Béla Ernyey =

Bela Ernyey
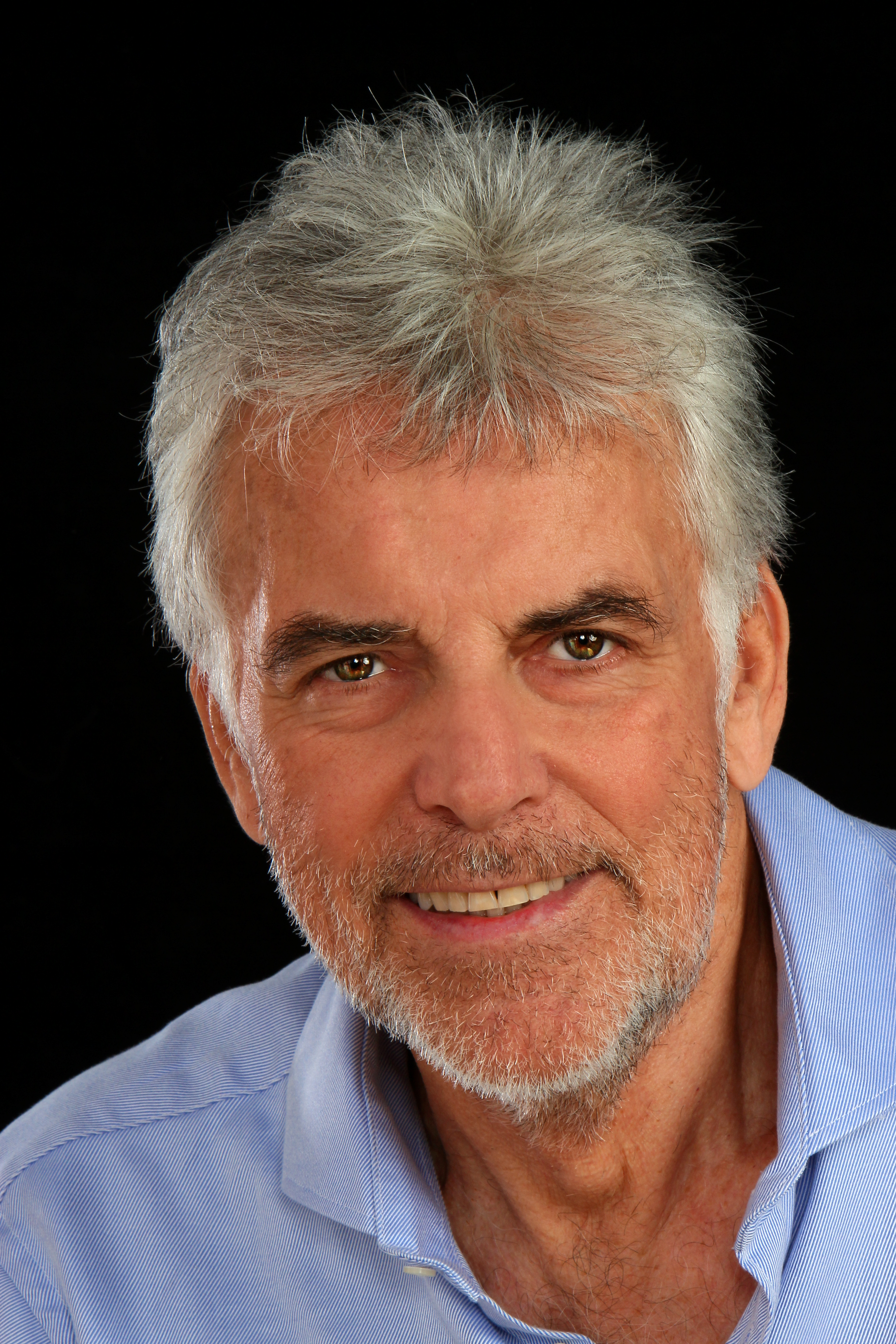
- Born: 10 June 1942 (age 83); Budapest, Hungary
- Occupation: Actor
- Years active: 1964- (film)

Béla Ernyey (also known as Béla Erny in German speaking countries; born 10 June 1942) is a Hungarian film, television actor and singer with an Austrian passport.

== Life ==
Ernyey absolved the University of Theater and Movie Art in Budapest after doing his A-level at Toldy High School. Afterwards he played classic and modern roles, just as musicals in the VIG-Theater in Budapest for nine years. At the age of 24 he played the main character in the 13 part TV series Princ, a katona (Prince, the soldier) for MTV Hungary (1966–67), which made him famous at the Hungarian audience over night. 1973 to 1976 he was acting at the Theater an der Wien in Vienna and 1978 to 1990 at the Gärtnerplatztheater in Munich. He also played in many TV series and shows in Hungary, Austria and Germany. 1986 he was the main character in the internationally produced TV film Der Beau (The beau), which he also co-produced. 1989 he released his first book, the autobiography Az álmok veszélyes dolgok, which was published both in Hungary and Germany. Several more books followed - with 3 novels and a cook book among them - which were all released by Hungarian publishers. Ernyey mostly operates in Hungary since 2005, where he participates in reality and cooking shows, but can also be seen as an actor at the broadcasts RTL Klub and TV2. He is connected to the state broadcast MTV Hungary since 1965. He produced and hosted the talkshow Hölgyválasz (Ladies choice) (2002–2005).

Ernyey used to be in a relationship with the actress and singer Heidi Brühl. He is currently married to the Hungarian lawyer Dóra Balaton.

== Awards ==
Ernyey was awarded with the Stern des Jahres (the star of the year) in 1976, a German award for the best Musical actor. He also won the Hungarian award „Most popular young actor“, the audience award The ideal man and 1996 the Hungarian movie award Golden Butterfly for his movie life achievement. 2015 Ernyey was designated as an honorary member of the Europäische Kulturwerkstatt (European cultural workshop).

== Music ==
=== Singles ===
- 1976: Wenn du träumst
- 1977: Aber Bela (LP Phonogram Hamburg)
- 1979: Wenn man noch reden kann
- 1979: Eine total verrückte Nacht

=== Albums ===
- 1975: Musical-Erfolge Von Seinerzeit (Theater an der Wien, Lied Nr. 17 : Pippin Frei muß ich sein!)

== Selected filmography ==
- 1965: Congress of Love
- 1966–67: Princ, a katona (TV series, 13 episodes)
- 1968: Sexy Susan Sins Again
- 1973: Mein Onkel Benjamin (TV film)
- 1975: Meine Schwester und ich
- 1976: Rosemary's Daughter
- 1978: Just a Gigolo
- 1981: Familie Wirbelwind (A szeleburdi család)
- 1985: Mary Ward
- 1986: Irgendwie und Sowieso (TV series, two episodes)
- 1986: Der Beau
- 1987: Das Traumschiff - Mexiko (TV series episode)
- 1991: Tatort: Animals (TV series episode)
- 1993: Freunde fürs Leben (TV series, 6 episodes)
- 1995–1996: Jede Menge Leben (TV series)
- 1997: Rosamunde Pilcher: Die zweite Chance (TV film)
- 1999: Ein Herz wird wieder jung
- 2000: Unser Charly (TV series, two episodes)
- 2001: Polizeiruf 110 – Seestück mit Mädchen (TV series episode)
- 2005: SOKO Wien – Planspiele (TV series episode)

== Books ==
- John Cunningham. The Cinema of István Szabó: Visions of Europe. Columbia University Press, 2014.
- Träume sind gefährlich. F.A. Herbig Verlagsbuchhandlung GmbH. München, 1989. ISBN 3-77661-503-6 (erschienen 1987 unter dem Titel Az álmok veszélyes dolgok im Iris Verlag, Budapest)
- Hölgyválaszaim. Bestline Verlag. Budapest, 2002. ISBN 963-528-602-3
- Curva pericosola. Magyar Könyvklub. 2003. ISBN 963-547-986-7
- Sznobbarométer: praktikus kézikönyv feltörekvők számára. Magyar Könyvklub. 2004. ISBN 963-549-133-6
- Tapadós tangó. Athenaeum Verlag. Budapest, 2006. ISBN 963-9615-45-5
- A P@si. I.A.T Verlag. 2008. ISBN 978-963-9885-02-8
- Ünnepek és hétköznapok. Book Verlag. Budapest, 2011. ISBN 978-963-8894-25-0 (zusammen mit Dóra Balaton)
