= Call of the Forest (1965 film) =

- Directed by: Franz Antel
- Written by: Kurt Nachmann; Marie von Ebner-Eschenbach (novel Krambambuli)
- Produced by: Carl Szokoll
- Starring: Hans-Jürgen Bäumler; Terence Hill; Gerhard Riedmann
- Cinematography: Siegfried Hold
- Edited by: Hermine Diethelm
- Music by: Johannes Fehring
- Production company: Neue Delta Filmproduktion
- Distributed by: Nora-Filmverleih
- Release date: 1 October 1965
- Running time: 85 minutes
- Country: Austria
- Language: German

Call of the Forest (German: Ruf der Wälder) is a 1965 Austrian drama film directed by Franz Antel and starring Hans-Jürgen Bäumler, Terence Hill and Gerhard Riedmann. It is part of the popular tradition of heimatfilm.

It was made at the Sievering Studios in Vienna and on location in the Alpine resort of Kaprun. The film's sets were designed by the art director Otto Pischinger.

== Cast ==
- Hans-Jürgen Bäumler as Bernd Helwig (dubbed by Klaus Kindler)
- Terence Hill as Marcello Scalzi
- Gerhard Riedmann as Mathias
- Johanna Matz as Angelika Hirt
- Paul Hörbiger as Gustl Wegrainer
- Rudolf Prack as Ingenieur Prachner
- Ellen Farner as Petra
- Rolf Olsen as Kubesch
- Judith Dornys as Tina
- Franz Muxeneder as Pepi Nindl
- Raoul Retzer as Zingerl
- Eva Kinsky as Lucie
- Erich Padalewski as Felix
- Elisabeth Stiepl as Hofrätin

== Bibliography ==
- Hans-Michael Bock and Tim Bergfelder. The Concise Cinegraph: An Encyclopedia of German Cinema. Berghahn Books.
