= San Babila-8 P.M. =

1976 film

- Directed by: Carlo Lizzani
- Written by: Mino Giarda; Ugo Pirro; Carlo Lizzani
- Produced by: Carlo Maietto
- Starring: Daniele Asti
- Cinematography: Piergiorgio Pozzi
- Music by: Ennio Morricone
- Release date: 9 April 1976
- Running time: 105 minutes
- Country: Italy
- Language: Italian

San Babila-8 P.M. (Italian: San Babila ore 20: un delitto inutile) is a 1976 Italian drama film directed by Carlo Lizzani. It was entered into the 10th Moscow International Film Festival.

== Plot ==
The film is inspired by the events of violence that occurred in Piazza San Babila in Milan in 1975, where groups of neo-fascists and anarchist communists were the protagonists. Four Milanese boys are part of a fascist group, claiming with all sorts of violence a new order based on the squadrism of Benito Mussolini. The boys are fighting with the institutions and against the youth group of the communists and the anarchists, and often collide during the protests, with violent outcomes.

One day the leader of the fascist group asks Franco, the most insecure boy of the brigade, to perform a violent and demonstrative act against a randomly chosen communist boy, in order to redeem his "honor". So one night in Piazza San Babila the boys meet a couple of engaged, dressed in red (they are believed by some communists), and the group's madness pushes the boys to chase them, and to stab them. Franco is shocked and runs away from home, denouncing assault on the police.

== Cast ==
- Daniele Asti as Franco
- Brigitte Skay as Lalla
- Giuliano Cesareo as Miki Castiglioni
- Pietro Brambilla as Fabrizio
- Pietro Giannuso as Alfredo
- Grazia Baccari as Paolo's girlfriend
- Gilberto Squizzato as Paolo
