= Tutte Lemkow =

Norwegian actor (1918–1991)

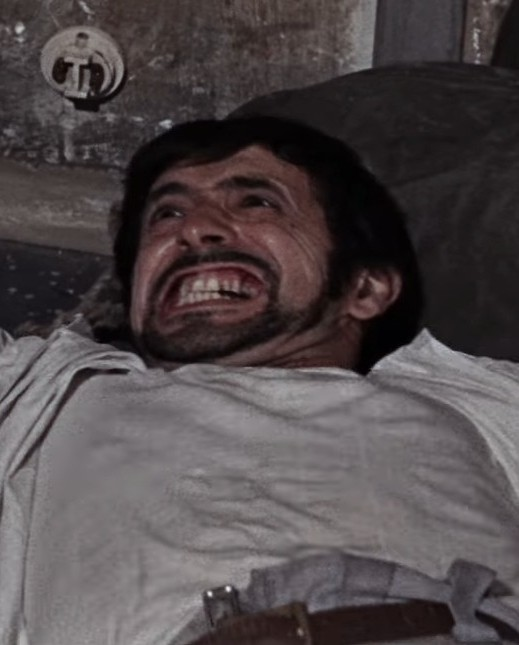
- Lemkow in The Guns of Navarone (1961)
- Born: Isak Samuel Lemkow; 28 August 1918; Kristiania, Norway
- Died: 10 November 1991 (aged 73); London, England
- Occupations: Actor, dancer
- Years active: 1945–1985
- Spouse(s): Mai Zetterling (m. 1944; div. 1953) Sara Luzita (m. 1954; div.)
- Children: 4

Tutte Lemkow (born Isak Samuel Lemkow; 28 August 1918 – 10 November 1991) was a Norwegian actor and dancer, who played mostly villainous roles in British television and films. His chief claims to mainstream familiarity were his roles as the fiddler in the film version of Fiddler on the Roof and the old man ("Imam") who translates the inscription on the headpiece of the Staff of Ra for Indiana Jones in Raiders of the Lost Ark.

== Career ==
Lemkow appeared as a dancer, together with Sara Luzita, in John Huston's 1952 film Moulin Rouge. Other films include Blake Edwards' A Shot in the Dark as the Cossack who drinks the poison intended for Peter Sellers' Inspector Clouseau, Sellers's films The Wrong Arm of the Law, The Wrong Box and Ghost in the Noonday Sun, Woody Allen's Love and Death and the Morecambe and Wise comedy film The Intelligence Men (1965).

He played three roles in Doctor Who with William Hartnell's Doctor: Kuiju in Marco Polo (1964), Ibrahim in The Crusade (1965) and Cyclops in The Myth Makers (1965). He provides choreography for The Celestial Toymaker (1966) in Doctor Who and the spoof Bond film Casino Royale (1967).

In 1968 he played the role of 'Old Gorky' in the episode "Legacy of Death" of The Avengers.

He adapted Ibsen's play for the 1983 film The Wild Duck.

== Personal life and death ==
Lemkow was born in Oslo, Norway, of Jewish heritage. He was married to Swedish actress Mai Zetterling from 1944 to 1953. In 1954, he married dancer Sara Luzita.

Lemkow died in London in 1991 of acute myeloid leukaemia at the age of 73. A biography called Tutte Lemkow; På tå hev written by Margaret Ljunggren was published in Oslo in 1989. (Gyldendal Norsk Forlag A/S)

== Filmography ==
- 1945 Galgmannen as Russian Dancer (uncredited)
- 1949 The Lost People as Jaroslav
- 1952 Moulin Rouge as Aicha's Partner
- 1953 The Captain's Paradise as Principal Dancer
- 1955 I Am a Camera as Electro-Therapist
- 1956 The Iron Petticoat as Sutisiyawa
- 1956 Zarak as Sword Dancer (uncredited)
- 1956 Anastasia as Kasbek Dancer (uncredited)
- 1958 Bonjour Tristesse as Pierre Schube (uncredited)
- 1958 Sea Fury as Dancer (uncredited)
- 1959 Too Many Crooks as Swarth Man
- 1959 Ben-Hur as Leper (uncredited)
- 1959 The Stranglers of Bombay as Ram Das
- 1959 Tommy the Toreador as Bootblack
- 1960 The Boy Who Stole a Million as Mateo
- 1960 Sands of the Desert as Bus Driver
- 1960 The Siege of Sidney Street as Dmitrieff
- 1961 The Hellfire Club as Higgins
- 1961 A Weekend with Lulu as Léon, The Postman
- 1961 The Green Helmet as Carlo Zaraga
- 1961 The Guns of Navarone as Nicolai
- 1961 The Treasure of Monte Cristo as Gino
- 1961 Ramona
- 1962 Guns of Darkness as Gino
- 1962 We Joined the Navy as Corporal
- 1962 On the Beat as Billposter in Underground (uncredited)
- 1962 The Road to Hong Kong as Hotel Servant (uncredited)
- 1963 The Wrong Arm of the Law as "Siggy" Schmoltz
- 1963 The Cracksman as The Choreographer
- 1963 The Victors as Sikh Soldier
- 1964 Becket as French Courtier (uncredited)
- 1964 Carry On Spying as Man in Marketplace (uncredited)
- 1964 A Shot in the Dark as Kazak Dancer
- 1964 The Moon-Spinners as Orestes
- 1965 The Intelligence Men as Seedy SCHLECHT Agent
- 1965 Masquerade as Paviot
- 1966 The Wrong Box as The Strangler
- 1967 Fathom as Mehmed
- 1968 Inspector Clouseau as "Frenchie" LeBec
- 1968 Duffy as Spaniard
- 1969 The Picasso Summer as Drunk
- 1969 Justine as Jens
- 1970 Revolution My A
- 1971 Fiddler on the Roof as Fiddler
- 1972 Raising the Roof as Alf
- 1973 Super Bitch
- 1973 Theatre of Blood as Meths Drinker
- 1973 Ghost in the Noonday Sun as Pontius Kak
- 1975 Love and Death as Pierre
- 1981 Sphinx as Tewfik
- 1981 Raiders of the Lost Ark as The Imam
- 1985 Mata Hari as Ybarra
- 1985 Red Sonja as The Wizard (final film role)
