= Ein echter Wiener geht nicht unter =

- Genre: Comedy
- Developed by: ORF
- Written by: Ernst Hinterberger
- Directed by: Reinhard Schwabenitzky (1-13); Rudolf Jusits (14-16); Kurt Ockermüller (17-24)
- Country of origin: Austria
- Original language: German
- No. of seasons: 1
- No. of episodes: 24

Production
- Running time: about 45 minutes
- Production company: ORF

Ein echter Wiener geht nicht unter (German; lit. 'A real Viennese does not go under'. Free translation: A real/proud Viennese never gives up) is a classic Austrian television series. It was produced by Österreichischer Rundfunk, Austrian Television, and ran for 24 episodes from 1975 to 1979. The script writer was Ernst Hinterberger; the series was based on his 1966 novel Das Salz der Erde (The Salt of the Earth). The producer was Hans Preiner, who initiated the project in his series Impulse (Impulses), which centered on development of new program formats and training of new, young directors.

Ein echter Wiener geht nicht unter starred popular Austrian actor Karl Merkatz as the main character, Edmund "Mundl" Sackbauer. Mundl lives in a typical Vienna Gemeindebau (a working-class housing estate) at Hasengasse, in Vienna's 10th municipal district (Favoriten). The series used Viennese dialect and became successful after an initial campaign against it by the Krone newspaper as too "common."

== Movies ==
In 1994 two episodes, Stille Nacht and Jahreswende, were combined into a movie that had success in theaters and was also available on VHS.

On December 19, 2008, the movie Echte Wiener - Die Sackbauer-Saga ("Real Viennese - The Sackbauer Saga"), set 30 years after the last episode of the TV series, opened in Austria. It was directed by Kurt Ockermüller and scripted by Ernst Hinterberger, and Karl Merkatz again played Mundl.

The sequel Echte Wiener II - Die Deppat'n und die Gspritzt'n is planned to open in December 2010.

== Characters ==
=== Edmund "Mundl" Sackbauer ===
Edmund Sackbauer is the main character of the series. In the first 13 episodes he is shown as very tyrannical and angry. After a big quarrel with his wife and a serious accident at work, he changes, and the program lost something of its joke because Mundl's "fits" were really amusing.

=== Antonia Sackbauer ===
Antonia ("Toni") Sackbauer is Edmund Sackbauer's wife. Although a woman of few words, she generally has the last word and unlike her husband, always makes rational decisions. She is a housewife, but because of money problems gets a job as a janitor in a drugstore. She is warm and generous and a confidante to many of her friends and acquaintances.

In the course of the series we learn that the super, Kurt Blahovec, once thought about marrying her.

=== Karl Sackbauer ===
Karl ("Karli") is the Sackbauers' older child and takes after his father: like Mundl he likes drinking beer, shouts a lot, and uses a lot of obscenities that sometimes get him in trouble. Very early in the series he marries Irma Werner and by the end they have two children, René and Petra. He fights a lot with his sister and is extremely disrespectful to his parents. He drives a forklift but a promotion to supervisor enables him to afford his own apartment.

In the book on which the series is based, he turned his back on Vienna and went to Paris, where he did well as a wrestler; this had to be changed after the slightly built Klaus Rott was cast in the part, and also there was no money for filming out of the country.

Rott had a cabaret act as Karli in which he continued the story of the Sackbauers.

=== Johanna Sackbauer ===
"Hanni" is the Sackbauers' younger child and in the first episode becomes engaged to an avant garde writer, Franz Vejvoda, leading to big problems in the family. She is often envious and takes offense easily. Starting with the episode Jahreswende she is preoccupied with women's liberation, which also causes problems in her male-dominated family. To keep up with her fiancé she takes college courses in literature and typing.

=== Johann Sackbauer ===
Mundl's brother, known as "Schani," is sympathetic to the family and often talks Mundl down from his rages.
