= My Father, the Ape and I =

- German film poster
- Directed by: Franz Antel
- Written by: Franz Antel; George Hurdalek; Otto Pribil
- Produced by: Kurt Kodal; Carl Szokoll
- Starring: Gerhart Lippert; Mascha Gonska; Paul Löwinger
- Cinematography: Hanns Matula
- Edited by: Arnfried Heyne
- Music by: Gerhard Heinz
- Production companies: Franz Antel Film; Neue Delta Filmproduktion; Terra-Filmkunst; Wien-Film
- Distributed by: Constantin Film
- Release date: 5 March 1971
- Running time: 88 minutes
- Countries: Austria; West Germany
- Language: German

My Father, the Ape and I (German: Mein Vater, der Affe und ich) is a 1971 Austrian-West German comedy film directed by Franz Antel and starring Gerhart Lippert, Mascha Gonska, Paul Löwinger.

The film's sets were designed by the art director Nino Borghi.

== Cast ==
- Gerhart Lippert as Dr. Klaus Wolf
- Mascha Gonska as Brigitte 'Biggi' Hansen
- Teri Tordai as Ruth
- Gunther Philipp as Prof. Dr. Felix Grimm
- Paul Löwinger as Kranzl
- Beppo Brem as Engelbert
- Lotte Ledl as Karin
- Eva Maria Meineke as Mrs. Finch
- Fritz Muliar as Smekal
- Carlo Böhm as Hotel doorman
- Heinz Reincke as Konsul Hansen
- Michael Holm as Self
