= Siegfried Hold =

German cinematographer

- Born: 18 August 1931; Johannisburg, East Prussia, Germany
- Died: 16 December 2003 (aged 72); Innsbruck, Austria
- Occupation: Cinematographer
- Years active: 1955-2002 (film & TV)

Siegfried Hold (1931 – 2003) was a German cinematographer. During the 1960s he shot a number of European western and adventure films, often co-productions between West Germany and other nations. He was the brother of the actress Marianne Hold. They were born in East Prussia, but towards the end of the Second World War they fled from the advancing Soviet forces and settled in Innsbruck.

== Selected filmography ==
- The Stolen Trousers (1956)
- Always Trouble with the Bed (1961)
- Robert and Bertram (1961)
- The Happy Years of the Thorwalds (1962)
- Wild Water (1962)
- Café Oriental (1962)
- The Curse of the Yellow Snake (1963)
- Old Shatterhand (1964)
- Freddy in the Wild West (1964)
- The Great Skate (1964)
- The Monster of London City (1964)
- Legacy of the Incas (1965)
- Call of the Forest (1965)
- The Treasure of the Aztecs (1965)
- The Pyramid of the Sun God (1965)
- Killer's Carnival (1966)
- The Sweet Sins of Sexy Susan (1967)
- The Great Happiness (1967)
- Spy Today, Die Tomorrow (1967)
- Target for Killing (1969)
- The Countess Died of Laughter (1973)

== Bibliography ==
- Bergfelder, Tim. International Adventures: German Popular Cinema and European Co-Productions in the 1960s. Berghahn Books, 2005.
