= Ellen Farner =

German actress (born 1941)

Ellen Farner (born 1941 in Germany) (Note: Although there is no clear consensus as to Farner's DOB (with even German Wikipedia unable to do more than offer a choice between two guess-timates—1940 as per IMDb vs. 1941 as per CSFD.cz—and two contemporaneous sources that would place it at either 1945 or '46, the fact that what CSFD.cz actually provides is not merely a year but an actual date—and that it is the only one of these four sources to do so—would seem to lend 1941 the most credibility.) is a former actress and model, active between 1962 and 1970, best known for her role in The Umbrellas of Cherbourg (1964).

== Career ==
Prior to her film debut, Farner made at least one notable stage appearance in 1962, starring in Shakespeare's Romeo and Juliet in Ingolstadt.

On June 1, 1964, four months after Cherbourg's French premiere, Newsweek reported a brief Farner sighting roughly halfway through producer Albert Zugsmith's protracted search for the female lead in what would prove the first of many screen adaptations of the 18th-century erotic novel, Fanny Hill.

... Zugsmith then tried France's Veronique Vendell, but she was too voluptuous and too busty for the role of a teen-age country girl just come to London. Ellen Farner was Fanny No. 3, and she was ruled out, too, but nobody will say why...

Although most of the plaudits received by Cherbourg's cast, at least among American critics, were reserved for the two romantic leads, at least two reviewers made special note of Farner's moving delineation of a young girl's maturation.

The story is hardly worth the telling, so predictable as to be boring, but the cast is good. Everyone is pretty, and perhaps the stealer of the show is Ellen Farner, who plays Madeleine. Watching her flower as unrequited love gradually makes the grade is a real delight. The others are just handsome people presenting a new kind of movie.

Described in 1965 as a "petite performer with waist-length brown hair," Farner was also employed as a model at least as late as 1969.

== Personal life ==
Although it is unclear when or how they first met, or whether or not they ever collaborated professionally, Farner's remarks about the late director Léonide Moguy in the introduction to his 2018 biography clearly convey the esteem in which she still held her "sublime" friend more than three decades after his death.

Pour moi, Léonide Moguy était l'ami sublime. Son humanité, son charisme et son intelligence me subjuguaient. Début 1976, je l'ai revu et son regard bienveillant me poursuit encore et me prodigue une sérénité chaleureuse.

== Filmography ==
=== Film ===
- The Umbrellas of Cherbourg (1964)
- Die drei Scheinheiligen (1964)
- Ruf der Wälder (1965)

=== Television ===
- Der gelbe Pullover (TV film) (1964)
- Die Karte mit dem Luchskopf (Fernsehserie, Folge Der Mann mit der Silbermaske) (1965)
- Die Abenteuer des Bob Moran (series, episode "La vallée des brontosaures") (1965)
- Es geschah in Berlin (series, episode "Als gestohlen gemeldet") (1965)
- Unsterblichkeit mit Marschmusik (TV film) (1965)
- John Klings Abenteuer (series, episode "Goldfische) (1966)
- Intercontinental Express (series, episode "Die Puppe mit dem Porzellankopf") (1966)
- Von null Uhr eins bis Mitternacht (series, episode "Die Hochzeit") (1967)
- Sie schreiben mit (series, episode "Folge Der Job") (1970)
