= Teri Tordai =

Hungarian actress (born 1941)

- Born: 28 December 1941 (age 84); Debrecen, Hungary
- Other name: Terry Torday
- Occupation: Actress
- Years active: 1962–present

Teri Tordai (born 28 December 1941) is a Hungarian actress.

She has appeared in a large number of European films, including a number of costume films made in the late 1960s and early 1970s, especially Frau Wirtin series of Franz Antel, which made her a sex symbol in German-speaking countries as well as Italy. She was awarded the Kossuth Prize in 2018.

She is sometimes credited as Terry Torday.

Her daughter is the actress Lili Horváth.

== Selected filmography ==
- Háry János (1965)
- A Holiday with Piroschka (1965)
- The Sweet Sins of Sexy Susan (1967)
- Otto ist auf Frauen scharf (1968)
- Tower of Screaming Virgins (1968)
- Sexy Susan Sins Again (1968)
- House of Pleasure (1969)
- Why Did I Ever Say Yes Twice? (1969)
- Naughty Roommates (1969)
- The Captain (1971)
- My Father, the Ape and I (1971)
- The Countess Died of Laughter (1973)
- The Pendragon Legend (1974)
- Julia (1974)
- Monika and the Sixteen Year Olds (1975)
- Crime After School (1975)
- Love Hotel in Tyrol (1978)
- The Train Killer (1983)
- Popcorn & Paprika (1984)
- Colonel Redl (1985)
- The Red Countess (1985)
- Hanna's War (1988)
- Montecarlo! (2004)
- Adventure (2011)

== Bibliography ==
- Halle, Randall & McCarthy, Margaret. Light Motives: German Popular Film in Perspective. Wayne State University Press, 2003.
