= Ernst Hinterberger =

Austrian writer

- Born: 17 October 1931; Vienna
- Died: 14 May 2012 (aged 80); Vienna
- Occupations: Writer of novels and plays
- Spouse(s): Margarete ("Gerti") (1958–2001); Karla (2004–2012)
- Writing career
- Period: Contemporary
- Notable works: Ein echter Wiener geht nicht unter Kaisermühlen-Blues
- Literary movement: Vienna dialect

Ernst Hinterberger (17 October 1931 – 14 May 2012) was an Austrian writer of novels, particularly detective novels, plays and successful sitcoms. His first TV scripts were unusual for their use of genuine Vienna dialect.

== Life ==
Ernst Hinterberger was born and died in Vienna. He was the son of an unemployed typesetter, who died when Ernst was seven. He completed training as an electrician, then from 1950 to 1952 he trained at the Vienna Police School to be a police officer, but had to leave a few weeks after beginning work because he suddenly needed glasses, which was not acceptable at the time. Following his time with the police, he first worked as a labourer. In 1958 he married and attended the City of Vienna's Library School, following which he worked for ten years as a librarian in adult education centres. After these libraries were closed in 1968, he worked in shipping in a factory until his retirement in 1991. He was unwilling to rely on writing to provide his entire income. He has lung damage from the factory work.

Hinterberger discovered literature in the 1950s through the Bavarian author Oskar Maria Graf; he began writing when he was 24 or 25 years old.

Since approximately 1954, Hinterberger had lived in a 44 square metre city-owned flat on the Margaretengürtel in Vienna. His first wife, Margarete ("Gerti") died in 2001 after 45 years of marriage, nine months before the 2002 publication of his book Ein Abschied. Lebenserinnerungen ("A Farewell: Life Memories"). In that book he said he was resigned and wanted nothing more to do with the world. Hinterberger had since remarried, to Karla.

Hinterberger was a practising Buddhist and had written poems in Chinese style, but they have never appeared in German. He was cremated at Feuerhalle Simmering. His ashes are buried in Vienna Central Cemetery.

== Works ==
=== Ein echter Wiener geht nicht unter ===
Hinterberger's Edmund "Mundl" Sackbauer, (anti-)hero of the television series Ein echter Wiener geht nicht unter, came to typify the Viennese renter in the German-speaking world.

Sackbauer is a complainer who is actually a good man at the bottom of his heart, but is always giving in. In contrast, the original figure in Hinterberger's mid-1960s book Das Salz der Erde on which he based the series is a pitiful man in the throes of midlife crisis, who notices while on holiday in Italy that his control over his family is dissolving. At the end of the book he leaves his wife, fails in his attempt to revive his self-confidence in a bordello, and is last seen uncertain whether in his outburst of emotion he has killed the prostitute or whether she is only injured.

In 2008 Echte Wiener – Die Sackbauer-Saga, a film based on the series, also written by Hinterberger, appeared.

=== Books (selection) ===
- 1965 Beweisaufnahme ("Taking Evidence"), novel
- 1966 Salz der Erde ("Salt of the Earth"), novel
- 1975 Wer fragt nach uns: Geschichten von kleinen Leuten, armen Hunden und Aussenseitern ("Who Asks for Us: Stories of Little People, Poor Dogs and Outsiders"), historical novel
- 1977 Das Abbruchhaus ("The Demolition House"), novel
- 1984 Jogging, detective novel
- 1988 Superzwölfer ("Super Twelver"), detective novel
- 1989 Kleine Leute ("Little People"), novel
- 1991 Das fehlende W ("The Missing W"), detective novel
- 1992 Und über uns die Heldenahnen ... ("And Above Us the Heroic Ancestors . . ."), detective novel
- 1993 Alleingang ("Walking Alone"), detective novel
- 1993 Kleine Blumen ("Little Flowers"), detective novel
- 1993 Von furzenden Pferden, Ausland und Inländern ("Of Farting Horses, Foreign Countries and Natives"), novel
- 1997 Zahltag ("Pay Day"), detective novel
- 1998 Die dunkle Seite ("The Dark Side"), detective novel
- 2002 Ein Abschied. Lebenserinnerungen ("A Farewell: Life Memories")

=== Plays ===
- Im Käfig ("In The Cage")
- Immer ist ja nicht Sonntag ("After All It's not Always Sunday")
- Die Puppe ("The Doll")
- Offene Gesellschaft ("Open Society")
- Swimmingpool

=== Television ===
- 1975–79 Ein echter Wiener geht nicht unter ("A Genuine Viennese Does not Go Under"), 24-episode sitcom
- 1992–99 Kaisermühlen-Blues, 64-episode sitcom – resulted in the spin-off of:
- 2000–05 Trautmann (Trautman is a detective figure in Kaisermühlen-Blues)

== Awards ==
- City of Vienna Achievement Award, 1971
- Anton Wildgans Prize of Austrian Industry, for Wer fragt nach uns, 1974
- Golden Romy, Kurier TV Star, 1993
- Austrian Cross of Honour for Science and Art, 1994
- Gold Award for Service of the City of Vienna, 1996
- Ehrenkieberer ("Honorary Cop"), award from the Vereinigung der Bundeskriminalbeamten Österreichs, shared with Wolfgang Böck, 2001
- Austrian Cross of Honour for Science and Art, 1st class, 2003
- Goldener Rathausmann ("Gold Town Hall Man") of the City of Vienna, 2007
- Buchliebling Lifetime Award, 2009
- Axel Corti Prize for lifetime achievement, 2010

== Sources ==
- "Die Menschen anschauen", Datum May 2008
