= Der Bockerer =

1981 film

- Directed by: Franz Antel
- Written by: Kurt Nachmann; Ulrich Becher; Peter Preses
- Produced by: Franz Antel
- Starring: Karl Merkatz
- Cinematography: Ernst W. Kalinke
- Release date: July 1981
- Running time: 104 minutes
- Country: Austria
- Language: German

Der Bockerer is a 1981 Austrian drama film directed and produced by Franz Antel. It was entered into the 12th Moscow International Film Festival where Karl Merkatz won the award for Best Actor. The film was also selected as the Austrian entry for the Best Foreign Language Film at the 54th Academy Awards, but was not accepted as a nominee.

== Cast ==
- Karl Merkatz as Karl Bockerer
- Alfred Böhm as Hatzinger
- Hans Holt as Herr Hofrat
- Marte Harell
- Ida Krottendorf as Sabine (Binerl) Bockerer
- Rolf Kutschera
- Erni Mangold as Besitzerin des Café Tosca
- Heinz Marecek as Dr. Rosenblatt
- Marianne Nentwich as Anna Hermann
- Thaddäus Podgorski as Pfalzner (as Teddy Podgorsky)
- Sieghardt Rupp as Herr Hermann
- Regina Sattler as Elisabeth (as Regine Sattler)
- Franz Stoss as Herr General (as Franz Stoß)
- Klausjürgen Wussow as Dr. Lamm

== See also ==
- List of submissions to the 54th Academy Awards for Best Foreign Language Film
- List of Austrian submissions for the Academy Award for Best Foreign Language Film
