= Sara Luzita =

British ballet dancer (1922–2025)

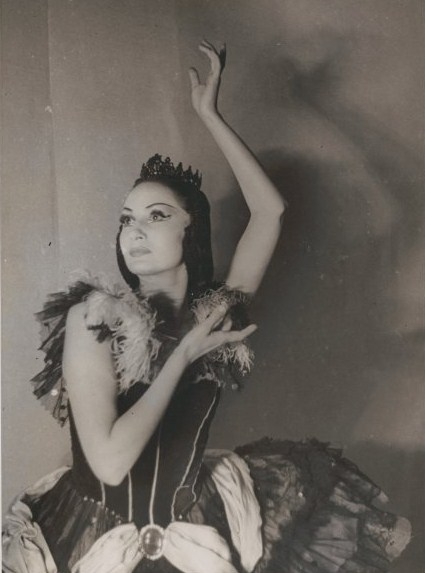
- Luzita in 1948
- Born: Sara Jacobs; 11 August 1922; Hanley, Staffordshire, England
- Died: 14 February 2025 (aged 102)
- Spouse: Tutte Lemkow (m. 1954)
- Children: 2

Sara Luzita (née Jacobs, 11 August 1922 – 14 February 2025) was a British dancer who specialised in ballet and Spanish dancing. She was a soloist for the Ballet Rambert (now Rambert Dance Company), performing in the West End, the international stage and on screen, including the films Moulin Rouge and Oh... Rosalinda!!.

== Personal life and death ==
In 1954, she married Tutte Lemkow. They had two daughters, Rachel and Rebecca.

Luzita turned 100 in August 2022, and died on 14 February 2025, at the age of 102.
