= Jacques Herlin =

French actor (1927–2014)

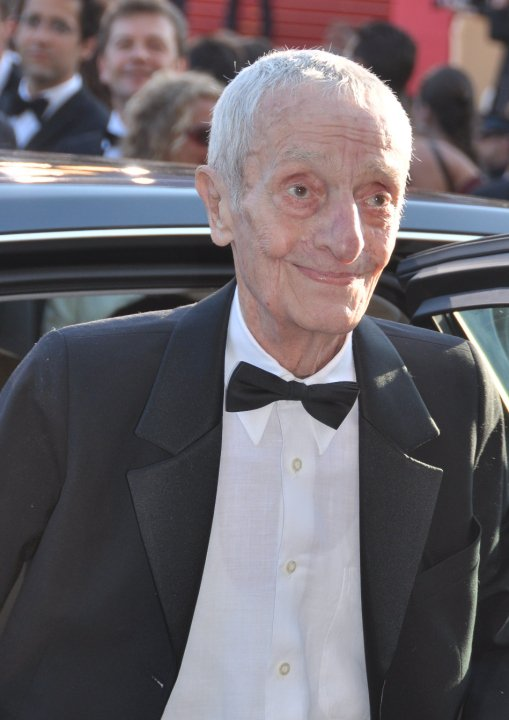
- Herlin at the 2010 Cannes Film Festival
- Born: Jacques de Jouette; 17 August 1927; Le Vésinet, France
- Died: 7 June 2014 (aged 86); Paris, France
- Occupation: Actor
- Years active: 1956–2014

Jacques Herlin (17 August 1927 – 7 June 2014) was a French character actor of stage, film, and television.

== Early life and education ==
Born as Jacques de Jouette in Le Vésinet, France, Jacques Herlin grew up in Toulon and moved to Paris in 1951 where he studied dramatic art for a year in Raymond Girard's class.

== Career ==
Herlin began acting on stage after moving from Toulon to Paris in 1951, mostly in smaller theaters with roles in classic plays, for one to two years. Herlin visited larger theaters, eventually meeting comedian Pierre Fresnay at Théâtre de la Michodière, and signed on to a play with Yvonne Printemps. His stage work continued for more than a decade.

In 1962, Herlin traveled to Italy to work in the play Tueur Sans Gages (The Killer), and Elio Petri offered him a role, after which he had continuous Cinecittà film work for more than seventeen years. Herlin played the uncredited role of Masoch Club Owner in Petri's The 10th Victim (1965). He also appeared in another uncredited role in Alberto Lattuada's La Mandrágora (The Mandrake, 1965), having been on-set for only one day. Herlin and Philippe Leroy-Beaulieu were friends and both appeared in the Tinto Brass western Yankee (1966).

Besides French, Italian and English language roles, Herlin also traveled to Germany for film roles, particularly comedies. Although he did not speak the language; he lived with a German girl who coached him using simultaneous translation.

During the 1970s, his roles included a Bank Clerk in Petri's Property Is No Longer a Theft (1973), and a Magician in the television miniseries Moses the Lawgiver (1974).

In the early 1980s, Herlin moved back to Paris, France after the free-fall decline of Italian cinema. In 1982 his agent offered a role in Umberto Lenzi's Ironmaster (1983), one of Herlin's last Italian film roles. He played Paul Reynaud, the French Prime Minister in the television miniseries The Winds of War (1983). Herlin had a recurring role as Igor in Frankenstein's Aunt (1987).

In the 1990s, Herlin appeared as a Judge on Counterstrike (1990), as Savant in Jefferson in Paris (1995), and as Virgil Baptiste on Julie Lescaut (1996).

During the 2000s, Herlin had a voice role in the French fantasy/comedy Astérix and Obélix: God Save Britannia (2012). That same year he played Marquis de Vaucouleurs in the drama, Farewell, My Queen (2012).

Herlin remained active on stage, film, and television up until his final role as Dominik Silva in Me and Kaminski, released posthumous in 2015.

== Death ==
Herlin died in 2014 at the age of 86.

== Filmography ==
=== Film ===
- Boulevard (1960) - Le garçon de café
- The Girl with the Golden Eyes (1961) - Un chauffeur de taxi
- Carillons sans joie (1962) - Benjouba
- Arsène Lupin Versus Arsène Lupin (1962)
- The Day and the Hour (1963)
- Goliath and the Sins of Babylon (1963) - Phoenician Merchant
- The Whip and the Body (1963) - Priest
- Temple of the White Elephant (1964) - British Officer
- White Voices (1964) - The Friar
- Buffalo Bill, Hero of the Far West (1965) - Piano Player
- Don Camillo in Moscow (1965) - Perletti
- The Dreamer (1965) - Marcello
- The 10th Victim (1965) - Masoch Club Manager (uncredited)
- The Mandrake (1965) - Frate Predicatore
- Seven Golden Men Strike Again (1966)
- Secret Agent Super Dragon (1966) - Ross
- A Maiden for a Prince (1966) - Il marchese spagnolo
- Yankee (1966) - Filosofo
- For a Few Extra Dollars (1966) - Traitor
- Pardon, Are You For or Against? (1966) - Bergerac
- Non faccio la guerra, faccio l'amore (1966)
- Ballata da un miliardo (1967)
- The Tiger and the Pussycat (1967) - Monsignore
- Seven Pistols for a Massacre (1967) - Horace Pim
- Tom Dollar (1967) - mr. Osborne
- Matchless (1967) - O-Chin's Doctor
- The Stranger (1967) - Director of Home
- The Girl and the General (1967) - The Veterinary
- Two Faces of the Dollar (1967) - Mathematician
- Your Turn to Die (1967) - Actor at recital
- The Sweet Sins of Sexy Susan (1967) - Count Dulce
- Tower of Screaming Virgins (1968) - King of France
- Sexy Susan Sins Again (1968) - St. Laduc
- Catch As Catch Can (1968) - Zoology Professor
- House of Pleasure (1969) - Ambassador Bulakieff
- Why Did I Ever Say Yes Twice? (1969) - Dr. Pellegrini
- Naughty Roommates (1969) - Frederic Joerges
- Giacomo Casanova: Childhood and Adolescence (1969) - Monsieur Alexandre
- Una storia d'amore (1970) - Rucó
- Frau Wirtin bläst auch gern Trompete (1970) - Baron Bierrechalet
- Frau Wirtin treibt es jetzt noch toller (1970) - Vicomte de Champenoise
- Musik, Musik - da wackelt die Penne (1970) - Dr. Wimmer
- Einer spinnt immer (1971) - Dr. Klemm
- Man of the Year (1971) - Prof. Godé
- The Mad Aunts Strike Out (1971) - Eddy Stubenrauch
- Per amore o per forza (1971)
- Außer Rand und Band am Wolfgangsee (1972) - Marcel
- Le mille e una notte all'italiana (1972)
- Slap the Monster on Page One (1972) - Lauri
- The Adventures of Pinocchio (1972) - 2° Dottore
- Il maschio ruspante (1972) - Lawyer - father of Rema
- Property Is No Longer a Theft (1973) - Bank Clerk
- Dirty Weekend (1973) - TV Journalist
- The Countess Died of Laughter (1973) - Monsieur Dulac
- Blue Blooms the Gentian (1973) - Alfons Ponelli
- Shaft in Africa (1973) - Perreau
- Property Is No Longer a Theft (1973) - Bank Employee
- Das Wandern ist Herrn Müllers Lust (1973) - Timothy
- Massacre in Rome (1973) - Giovanni
- Three Tough Guys (1974) - Barfly
- Tous les chemins mènent à l'homme (1974) - Adhémar
- Erotomania (1974) - The Surgeon
- Two Missionaries (1974) - The Bishop
- Chi ha rubato il tesoro dello scia? (1974)
- Mondo candido (1975) - Dr. Pangloss
- The Diamond Peddlers (1976) - Inspector Nelson
- Soldier of Fortune (1976)
- Plot of Fear (1976) - Pandolfi
- Carioca tigre (1976) - Kibbutz
- Casanova & Co. (1977) - Senator Dell'Acqua
- Three Swedes in Upper Bavaria (1977) - Müller-Meyerfall
- Pane, burro e marmellata (1977) - Dottor Gaetano Arfè - the psychiatrist
- Antonio Gramsci: The Days of Prison (1977) - Lo Santo
- War of the Robots (1978) - Prof. Carr
- Hurra - Die Schwedinnen sind da (1978) - Hugo Wiesinger, Ministerialrat
- Summer Night Fever (1978) - Ludwig
- Love Hotel in Tyrol (1978) - Armin Rübenzahl
- Inn of the Sinful Daughters (1978) - Maxi Huber 'Immobilien-Huber'
- Himmel, Scheich und Wolkenbruch (1979)
- Austern mit Senf (1979)
- Zum Gasthof der spritzigen Mädchen (1979) - Raffaele
- Lucky Star (1979) - Stepan - Stallmeister
- Speed Cross (1980) - Fischer
- I Hate Blondes (1980) - Party Guest
- Three Lederhosen in St. Tropez (1980) - Französischer Polizeichef
- Il Marchese del Grillo (1981) - Rabet
- The Salamander (1981) - Woodpecker
- Piratensender Power Play (1982) - Dr. Eisenhauer
- Die liebestollen Lederhosen (1982) - Hotelportier
- Odd Squad (1982) - French General
- Ironmaster (1983) - Raa the Wise
- Histoire du caporal (1983) - Le père
- Pappa e ciccia (1983) - Herr Schmidt (first story)
- Moon in the Gutter (1983)
- Plem, Plem - Die Schule brennt (1983)
- Happy Weekend (1983)
- Rive droite, rive gauche (1984) - Monsieur Vernakis
- Train d'enfer (1985)
- National Lampoon's European Vacation (1985) - Hotel Desk Clerk
- Funny Boy (1987) - Poum
- Freckled Max and the Spooks (1987) - Igor
- Chouans! (1988) - Le Marquis de St-Gildas
- The Gamble (1988) - Old fiancé of Olivia
- The Little Thief (1988) - Le sacristain
- Rebus (1989) - Albert
- Torrents of Spring (1989) - Pantaleone
- Un père et passe (1989) - Armand
- The Favour, the Watch and the Very Big Fish (1991) - Man with Hook-nose
- Un type bien (1991) - Monsieur Fez
- Krapatchouk (1992) - Travailleur immigré
- Entangled (1993) - Florent
- Justinien Trouvé, ou le bâtard de Dieu (1993)
- Not Everybody's Lucky Enough to Have Communist Parents (1993) - Choumerski
- Jefferson in Paris (1995) - Savant
- Au petit Marguery (1995) - Monsieur Piat
- Animals (1998) - Laurent
- The Creator (1999) - Le Majordome
- The Messenger: The Story of Joan of Arc (1999) - Orleans' Priest
- Off Key (2001) - Cardenal
- Le pharmacien de garde (2003) - M. Jouvin
- 7 ans de mariage (2003) - Grand-père Ménard
- L'incruste (2004) - Le grand-père
- Il ne faut jurer... de rien! (2005) - Lafayette
- A Good Year (2006) - Papa Duflot
- Madame Irma (2006) - Mr. Blanchard
- Room of Death (2007) - Marceau
- Hello Goodbye (2008) - L'oncle Albert
- Welcome (2009) - Policier centre de rétention
- In the Beginning (2009) - Gendarme 1
- Of Gods and Men (2010) - Amédée
- Our Day Will Come (2010) - Hervé Clavel
- Monsieur Papa (2011) - Le petit vieux en fauteuil roulant
- Guilty (2011) - Le gendarme
- Astérix and Obélix: God Save Britannia (2012) - Pegleg / Triple-Paw (voice)
- Farewell, My Queen (2012) - Marquis de Vaucouleurs
- Me and Kaminski (2015) - Dominik Silva (final film role)

=== Television ===
ACTOR television credits
Year	Title	Role	Notes	Ref.
1974	Moses the Lawgiver	Magician	TV miniseries	
1983	The Winds of War	Paul Reynaud, French Prime Minister	TV miniseries	
1987	Frankenstein's Aunt	Igor	7 episodes	
1990	Counterstrike	Judge Cardono	Episode: "Son with a Gun"	
1996	Julie Lescaut	Virgil Baptiste	1 episode	
