= Erich Padalewski =

Austrian actor (1930–2018)

- Born: 8 April 1930; Vienna, Austria
- Died: 24 February 2018 (aged 87); Austria
- Occupation: Actor
- Years active: 1960-2009 (film & TV)

Erich Padalewski (1930–2018) was an Austrian stage, film and television actor.

== Selected filmography ==
- Dance with Me Into the Morning (1962)
- Our Crazy Nieces (1963)
- Don't Fool with Me (1963)
- Call of the Forest (1965)
- House of Pleasure (1969)
- Housewives on the Job (1972)
- Always Trouble with the Reverend (1972)
- Alpine Glow in Dirndlrock (1974)
- To the Bitter End (1975)
- Crime and Passion (1976)
- The Mimosa Wants to Blossom Too (1976)
- Love Hotel in Tyrol (1978)

== Bibliography ==
- Roman Schliesser & Leo Moser. Die Supernase: Karl Spiehs und seine Filme. Ueberreuter, 2006.
