= Karl Merkatz =

Austrian actor (1930–2022)

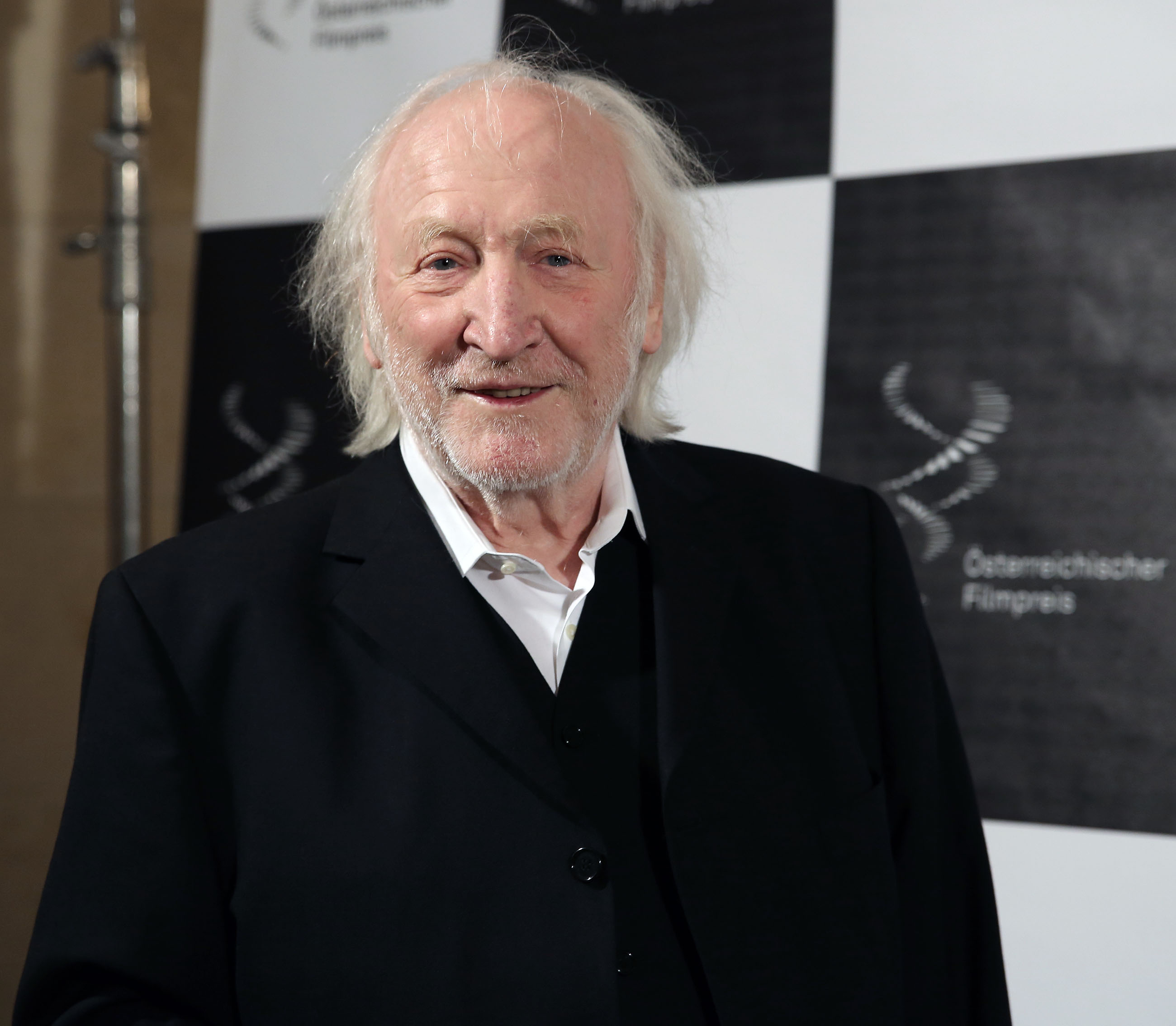
- Merkatz en 2013
- Born: 17 November 1930; Wiener Neustadt
- Died: 4 December 2022 (aged 92); Irrsdorf
- Alma mater: Mozarteum University Salzburg
- Occupation: Television actor, joiner, actor, writer, editor

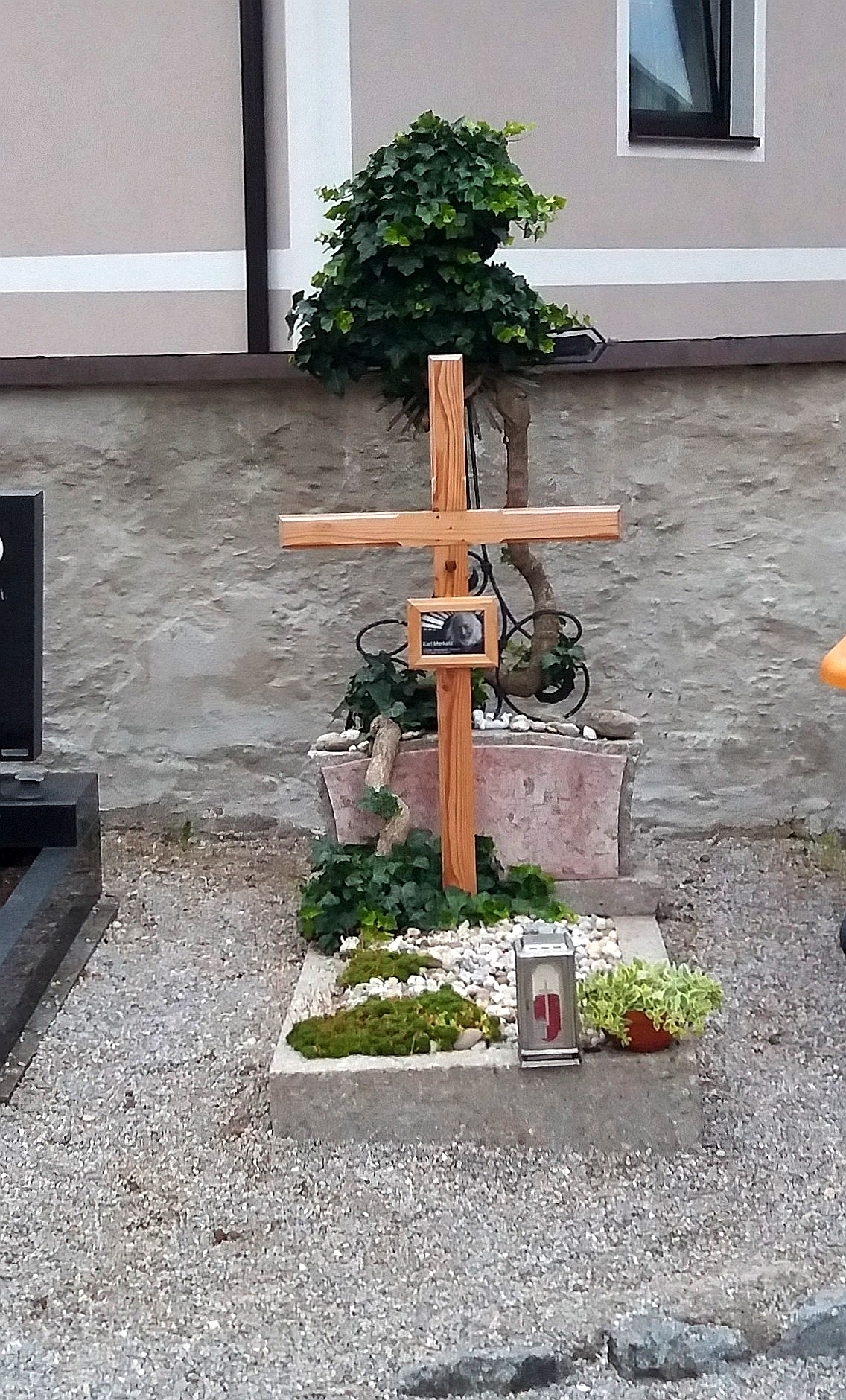
Irrsdorf near Straßwalchen: Karl Merkatz grave

Karl Merkatz (17 November 1930 – 4 December 2022) was an Austrian actor.

Merkatz was born on 17 November 1930 in Wiener Neustadt, the son of a toolmaker. He first wanted to become a carpenter. After World War II he was an active Boy Scout in Wiener Neustadt. However, later he started to enroll in acting lessons in Salzburg, Vienna and Zurich. Then he found employment in theatres, most notably in Munich, Salzburg, Hamburg (Deutsches Schauspielhaus, Thalia Theater), and Vienna (Theater in der Josefstadt, Burgtheater, Theater an der Wien).

During his later career he starred in several roles in television and motion pictures. In the role of Edmund Sackbauer (Mundl) in the 1970s, he became famous as a typical working class Viennese (Ein echter Wiener geht nicht unter). Another big success came with the films "Bockerer" starring as a naive Viennese during the Second World War in Vienna (the later films are set in the subsequent years up to 1968).

From 1998 to 2000 Karl Merkatz was honorary chairman of the human rights group SOS Mitmensch.

In 2005 Merkatz caused a deadly car accident in Henndorf (Salzburg).

Merkatz died in Straßwalchen on 4 December 2022, at the age of 92.

== Major roles ==
- Ein echter Wiener geht nicht unter: literally, A Genuine Viennese Does Not Go Down: In this 1975-1979 television series, which is about the life of a Viennese working-class family, he played Edmund "Mundl" Sackbauer, for which he is most known.
- Der Bockerer I-IV:, Merkatz plays the role of the Viennese butcher Karl Bockerer, who as a social democrat is shown during the time of the Anschluss and in the struggle against national socialism, during the post-war occupation of Austria by Allied forces, during the Hungarian Uprising of 1956 and the Prague Spring of 1968. He won the award for Best Actor at the 12th Moscow International Film Festival for his role in the first film.
- Der Mann von La Mancha: Merkatz played the roles of Miguel de Cervantes and Don Quixote in this 1994 German-language television adaptation of the classic musical Man of La Mancha.

== Decorations and awards ==
- Best Actor (1981) and Film Award (1982) for The Bockerer (Part 1)
- German Film Awards: Best Actor (1982) for The Bockerer (Part 1)
- Honorary Medal of the Austrian capital Vienna in Gold (1995) for his services to theaters in Vienna and as an excellent performer of Viennese Types
- Honorary Ring of Wiener Neustadt (1995)
- Golden Romy as the most popular actor (1996)
- Austrian Cross of Honour for Science and Art (1999)
- Grand Gold Decoration for Services to the province of Lower Austria (2002)
