= Franz Antel =

Austrian filmmaker (1913–2007)

- Born: 28 June 1913; Vienna, Austria-Hungary
- Died: 11 August 2007 (aged 94); Vienna, Austria
- Occupation: Film director
- Years active: 1935-2003

Franz Antel (28 June 1913 – 11 August 2007) was an Austrian filmmaker.

Born in Vienna, Antel worked mainly as a film producer in the interwar years. After World War II, he began writing and directing films on a large scale. In the late 1940s, 1950s and 1960s these were mainly comedies (romantic, slapstick, and/or musical) and K.u.k. films all of which, for Austrian and German TV stations alike, have been a staple of weekend afternoon programming ever since. In between there is quite a sober film about the Oberst (Colonel) Redl affair that shook the Austro-Hungarian Monarchy on the eve of World War I. Antel himself later commented on this period, "I always wanted to provide good entertainment for the people at the cinema. After the screening, people should say: Well now, I am in a good mood, I will go out and have a glass of wine." (German original: "Ich wollte die Leute im Kino immer gut unterhalten. Die Besucher sollten nach der Filmvorführung sagen: So, jetzt bin ich gut aufgelegt, jetzt geh ich auf ein Viertel Wein.")

From the late 1960s, encouraged by the new opportunities in the film industry brought about by the sexual revolution, Antel gradually switched his main interest to soft porn and ribaldry. It was in particular his series of Frau Wirtin ("hostess") films, directed under the pseudonym François Legrand, with which he tried to win international recognition. Titles included The Sweet Sins of Sexy Susan (1967), Sexy Susan Sins Again (1968), Naughty Roommates (1969) and Don't Tell Daddy (aka Naughty Nymphs in the U.S.A.) (1972).

Antel would recount an anecdote about himself describing how, in order to live up to his reputation as a womanizer, he used to carry a pair of high heels in his luggage which he then would occasionally place in the corridor in front of his hotel room – especially when he was travelling alone.

Among the best known actors Antel had worked with from the 1940s to the 1970s were Hans Moser, Paul Hörbiger, Oskar Werner, Curd Jürgens, Tony Curtis, Herbert Fux, Heinrich Schweiger, Arthur Kennedy, Carroll Baker, Edwige Fenech, George Hilton, Marisa Berenson, Britt Ekland, Andréa Ferréol.

1981 was a turning point in Antel's career when he adapted for the big screen a stage play by Ulrich Becher and Peter Preses. Set from the days of the Anschluss of 1938 until after the end of the war, Der Bockerer is about a Viennese butcher named Karl Bockerer (Karl Merkatz) whose common sense rather than intellect tells him to oppose the Nazis and who dares to show resistance just because he is never fully aware of the possible fateful consequences of his actions. While Bockerer and his wife survive the war unscathed, their son joins the SA but, after some internal intrigue, is sent to the front and killed. The film was entered into the 12th Moscow International Film Festival.

The film's strong anti-fascist message, the moving dialogue, and performances by the crème de la crème of Austrian actors and actresses (Ida Krottendorf, Alfred Böhm, Heinz Marecek, Hans Holt, Dolores Schmidinger and many more) made Der Bockerer an unusually successful film and gave new impetus to Antel's career. He made three sequels, which follow the lives of the Bockerers well into the 1960s, each depicting a crucial historical event in Austria or one of its neighbouring countries:

- Der Bockerer II (1996) is about the ten-year occupation (1945-1955) of Austria by the allied powers;
- Der Bockerer III — Die Brücke von Andau (2000) is set at the time of the 1956 Hungarian Revolution; and, finally,
- Der Bockerer IV — Der Prager Frühling (2003) deals with the historical event of Alexander Dubček's Prague Spring in 1968.

== Selected filmography ==
- Immortal Melodies (1935)
- My Daughter Lives in Vienna (1940)
- The Singing House (1948)
- No Sin on the Alpine Pastures (1950)
- The Mine Foreman (1952)
- Ideal Woman Sought (1952)
- Hello Porter (1952)
- The Emperor Waltz (1953)
- Ein tolles Früchtchen (1953)
- The Sweetest Fruits (1954)
- The Red Prince (1954)
- Roses from the South (1954)
- The Congress Dances (1955)
- Marriage Sanitarium (1955)
- Espionage (1955)
- Emperor's Ball (1956)
- Love, Girls and Soldiers (1958)
- Der Schatz vom Toplitzsee (1959)
- The Bandit and the Princess (1962)
- Frühstück mit dem Tod (1964)
- The Great Skate (1964)
- Full Hearts and Empty Pockets (1964)
- Call of the Forest (1965)
- The Great Happiness (1967)
- The Sweet Sins of Sexy Susan (1967)
- Tower of Screaming Virgins (1968)
- Sexy Susan Sins Again (1968)
- Why Did I Ever Say Yes Twice? (1969)
- Naughty Roommates (1969)
- House of Pleasure (1969)
- My Father, the Ape and I (1971)
- Einer spinnt immer (1971)
- Sie nannten ihn Krambambuli (1972)
- The Merry Quartet from the Filling Station (1972)
- Blue Blooms the Gentian (1973)
- Prima ti suono e poi ti sparo (1975)
- As of Tomorrow (1976)
- Casanova & Co. (1977)
- Love Hotel in Tyrol (1978)
- Der Bockerer (1981)
- Johann Strauss: The King Without a Crown (1987)
- Der Bockerer II – Österreich ist frei (1996)
- Der Bockerer III – Die Brücke von Andau (2000)
- Der Bockerer IV – Prager Frühling (2003)
