= Carl Szokoll =

Anti-Nazi resistance member

- Born: 15 October 1915; Vienna, Austria-Hungary
- Died: 25 August 2004 (aged 88); Vienna, Austria
- Military career
- Allegiance: Nazi Germany; German resistance; Austrian resistance
- Branch: Wehrmacht
- Rank: Major
- Conflicts: World War II; Invasion of Poland; Battle of France
- Other work: Author, film producer

Carl Szokoll (15 October 1915 – 25 August 2004) was an Austrian resistance fighter involved in the 20 July Plot, major in the Wehrmacht, and, after the war, author and film producer.

== Early life ==
Szokoll was born in Vienna, the son of a low-ranking soldier in the Austrian army who had fought in the First World War and had been a long-term Russian prisoner of war. He grew up under poor circumstances in Vienna, but because he received excellent grades in primary and secondary school he was later admitted as an officer candidate in the Austrian army in 1934. In his years as a cadet, he met his wife Christl Kukula, the daughter of a Jewish Vienniese industrialist. After the Anschluss in 1938, he had to end his relationship with Kukula because of the Nuremberg laws that forbade romantic involvement with Jews. Despite this, he secretly stayed in contact with her during the next years and married her, after the war, in 1946. Together they had one son.

Because of his relationship to a half-Jewish woman (Halbjüdin as the Nuremberg laws put it), he was transferred from an élite panzer unit to the ordinary infantry regiment and fought in the first phases of World War II in Nazi Germany's assaults on Poland and France. Because he was wounded in battle, he was sent back to Vienna for work in the administration of the district of Vienna.

== Involvement in the 20 July plot ==
In 1943, then-Captain Szokoll was introduced in Berlin to colonel Claus von Stauffenberg, one of the heads of the resistance movement in the Third Reich, by the Austrian lieutenant colonel Robert Bernardis and got involved with them by monthly visits of Bernardis in Vienna since February 1944. When the 20 July plot seemed to have succeeded after Stauffenberg placed a bomb in the Führer Headquarters "Wolfsschanze", he was with Colonel Heinrich Kodré, the "Chief of Staff" in Vienna, one of the resistance's man of Stauffenberg, who executed along with Kodre the orders to seize all authorities and arrest the leading members of SS and the Nazi administration.

Colonel Kodre and Captain Szokoll, unlike their co-conspirators in Berlin, succeeded in rounding up nearly all Nazi officials in Vienna. When the plot leaders realized that Hitler had survived, Stauffenberg called Szokoll on a secure line in order to tell him that the attempt had failed. Although Szokoll was one of the last conspirators who had telephone contact with Stauffenberg, he was able to convince the Gestapo that he was only following orders and thus he escaped punishment as one of only a handful of conspirators who did.

== "Saviour of Vienna" ==
Being promoted major later in 1944, he tried to take all measures within his power to save Vienna from following the fate of so many other European cities before that had been destroyed in heavy fighting. In the first months of 1945, he got involved with the Austrian resistance movement and started to create a network of officers in order to contact the nearing Soviet Army and declare Vienna an open city. The plan was working well until early April 1945. Although Hitler had ordered the Wehrmacht to fight until the last man in the defence of Vienna, Szokoll's co-conspirators had implemented a plan that would order all troops to retreat from Vienna when the Soviets were close to the city. However, the conspiracy was discovered and Nazi officials immediately hanged the leading conspirators and searched for Szokoll. Once again, he managed to escape and, in the following days, took part in Operation Radetzky, the plan of the Austrian resistance to take over Vienna and prevent fighting as far as possible. In the view of the Allies, reflected in different contemporary and historical accounts, despite the bravery of Szokoll and co-conspirators, the Austrian Resistance was militarily negligible. The failed attempt to surrender Vienna did not reduce the price paid by Soviet troops. The Vienna Offensive saw intense street-to-street fighting for nearly a month, resulting in an estimated 167,940 combat casualties on the Soviet side. Szokoll acted as the provisory administrator of Vienna from the time the Wehrmacht had retreated, but was once again nearly taken prisoner by the Soviets when being accused of working for US intelligence.

== Post-war career ==
Honoured by the reinstated Austrian government for his merits on freeing Austria from the Nazis, he started a career as author and film producer. Among his work is the script for the film Der Bockerer, the production of Die letzte Brücke (the film that made Maria Schell famous), and his own autobiography that became a bestseller. He died in Vienna in 2004.

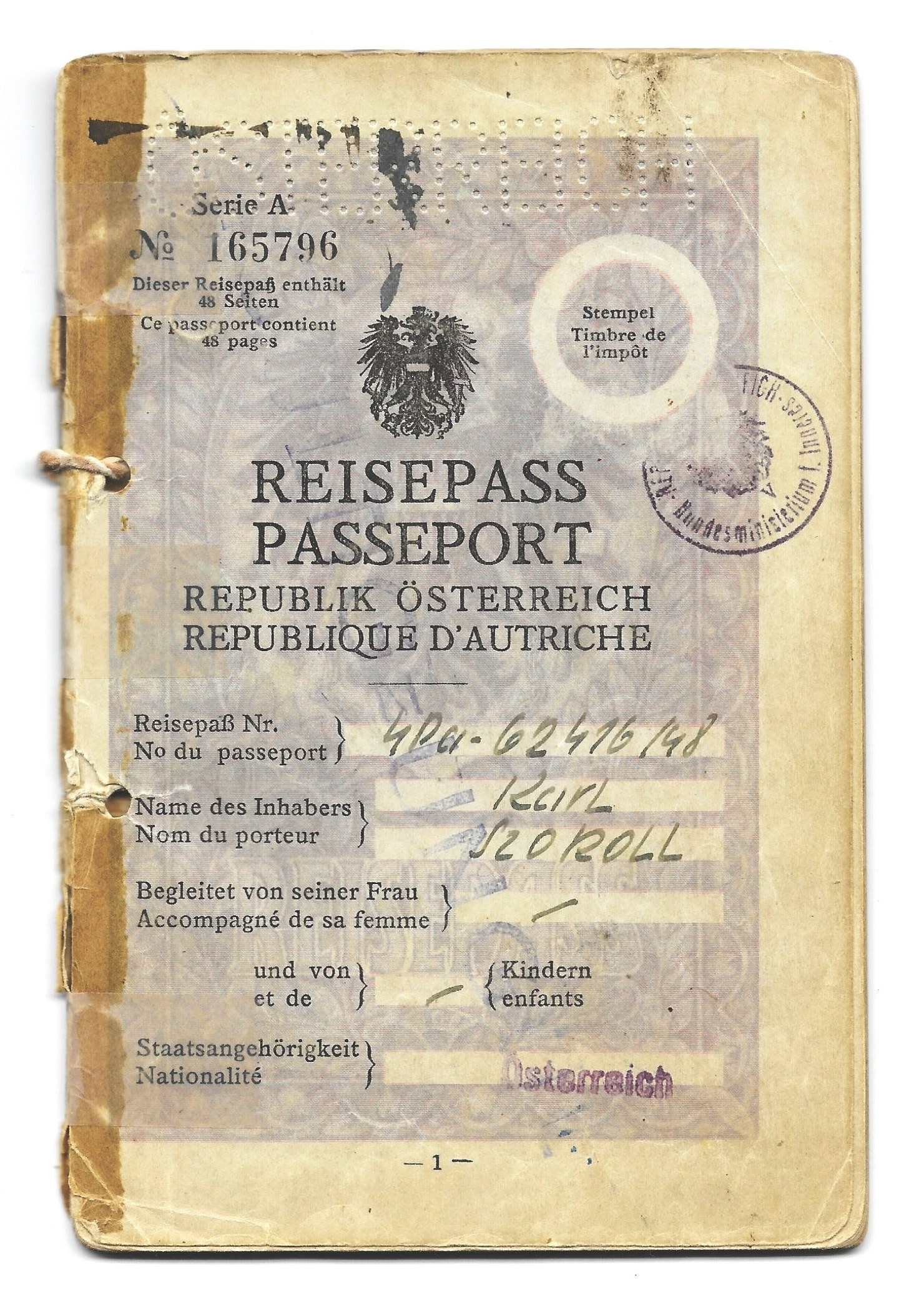
1948 Austrian passport issued to "July 20th" plot survivor Carl Szokoll.

== Selected filmography ==
- As the Sea Rages (1959)
- Final Accord (1960)
- The Mystery of the Green Spider (1960)
- The Great Skate (1964)
- Call of the Forest (1965)
- House of Pleasure (1969)
- My Father, the Ape and I (1971)

== Work ==
- Der Bockerer II : Österreich ist frei. Verlag der Apfel, Wien 1997 ISBN 3-85450-128-5
- Der gebrochene Eid. Europa-Verlag, Wien 1985 ISBN 3-203-50929-6
- Die Rettung Wiens 1945. Mein Leben, mein Anteil an der Verschwörung gegen Hitler und an der Befreiung Österreichs. Amalthea-Verlag, Wien 2001 ISBN 3-85002-472-5
- Ludwig Jedlicka: Der zwanzigste Juli in Wien, Herold, Wien 1964

== See also ==
- List of Austrians
- List of members of the 20 July plot

== Sources ==
- Neugebauer, Wolfgang (2017). The Austrian Resistance 1938-1945. Wien: Steinbauer.
