= Three Men in the Snow =

Three Men in the Snow may refer to:

- Three Men in the Snow (novel), a 1934 novel by Erich Kästner, and its film adaptations:
  - Three Men in the Snow (1936 film), a Czech comedy film
  - Three Men in the Snow (1955 film), a German comedy film
  - Three Men in the Snow (1974 film), a West German comedy film
