= Christmas Carol, Chemically Cleaned =

Poem by the German writer Erich Kästner, first appeared in 1927

"Christmas Carol, Chemically Cleaned" (German: "Weihnachtslied, chemisch gereinigt") is a poem by the German writer Erich Kästner. It first appeared in the 1927 Christmas issue of the magazine, Das Tage-Buch. In 1928, Kästner included it in his first collection of poems, Herz auf Taille. Since then, it has been printed in various anthologies and performed by numerous artists.

The poem parodies the well-known German Christmas carol "Morgen, Kinder, wird's was geben" ("Tomorrow, children, there will be something"). In this poem, Kästner expresses a satirical sentiment that on Christmas day, poor children will not receive anything, as presents and a splendid Christmas for poor children are not necessary or desirable. Kästner wrote the poem as a response to the social tensions in the Weimar Republic. He portrays the sentimentality of Christmas as a "dry cleaning" in the style of the German art movement known as New Objectivity.

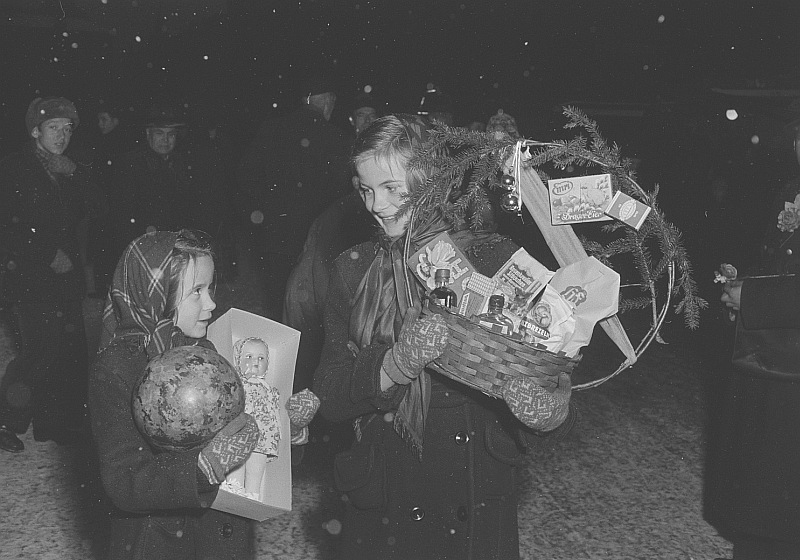
Children with gifts on a Christmas market

== Summary ==
The poem begins with the statement: "Tomorrow, children, there will be nothing!" (in German:" Morgen, Kinder, wird's nichts geben"). Presents are only for those who already have them.

For the others, the gift of life is enough. Their time will come someday, but not tomorrow. One should not be sad about poverty, it is loved by the rich and relieves one from unfashionable gifts as well as from indigestion.

A Christmas tree was unnecessary, Christmas could be enjoyed on the street, and Christianity proclaimed from the church tower increased intelligence. Poverty could teach pride.

If you have no other wood for the stove, you should just burn the board in front of your head. By waiting, one learns patience, learns for life. In any case, God in his all-embracing goodness cannot be called to account. The poem ends with the exclamation, "Oh, dear Christmastime!" (in German: "Ach, du liebe Weihnachtszeit!").

== Structure ==
The poem "Weihnachtslied, chemisch gereinigt" consists of five stanzas of six verses each. According to its subtitle, it is based on the Christmas carol "Morgen, Kinder, wird's was geben" ("Tomorrow, children, there will be something"). It imitates its accentuating metre, which consists entirely of trochaic verses.

The rhyme scheme of each stanza is formed by a cross-rhyme with a final couplet ([ababcc]). The verses, all of which are four-height, end in cross-rhyme alternately with an unstressed and a stressed syllable, thus alternating between acatalexes and catalexes, while the paired-rhyme verses are consistently catalectic.

== Style and language ==
"Christmas Carol, Chemically Cleaned" is a parody of the well-known Christmas carol "Morgen, Kinder, wird's was geben", the lyrics of which were written by Karl Friedrich Splittegarb. It contradicts its title and inverts it into the opposing statement of "Morgen, Kinder, wird's nichts geben!"—"something" to "nothing". Hans-Georg Kemper spoke of the reverse procedure of a contrafactum, the spiritual rewriting of the lyrics of a secular song. In this case it was done satirically to ridicule. In addition to "Morgen, Kinder, wird's was geben", Kästner quotes other traditional carols from the Christmas season in the poem: "Morgen kommt der Weihnachtsmann", ("Stille Nacht, heilige Nacht"), as well as Psalm 36:6 "Herr, deine Güte reicht, so weit der Himmel ist" {"Lord, your goodness extends as far as the sky is, and your truth as far as the clouds go." }.

According to Hermann Kurzke, Kästner "shreds" "the songs and aphorisms of the Christmas season" to break with their sentimentalities. His language is "brisk and cheeky, mocking to scornful, not sweet but salted". It uses a modern and casual vocabulary, colloquial expressions such as "pfeifen drauf" ("whistle on it") or sober brand names such as Osram. Instead of "Christianity, blown from the tower" (in German: "Christentum, vom Turm geblasen"), the poem spreads unromanticism and a lack of illusion. In its "chemical purification" of Christmas, it uses the stylistic means of New Objectivity with realistic, time-critical content and sober, detached language.

== Interpretation ==
=== Time reference and personal background ===
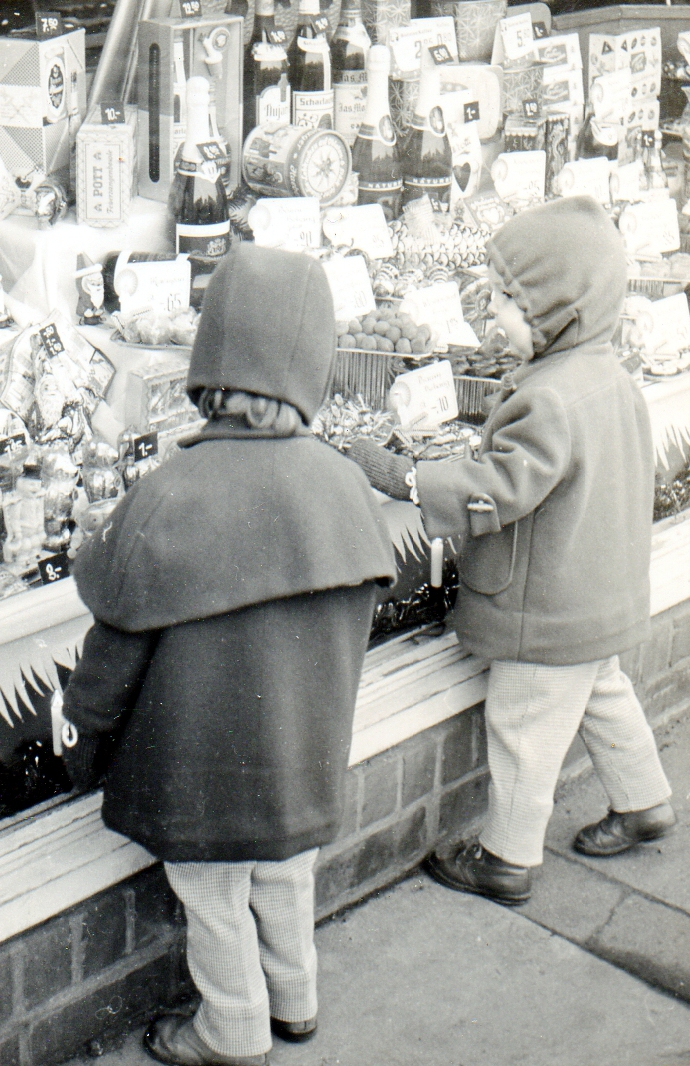
Children in front of a Christmas shop window with sweets, Hamburg 1959

For Kurt Beutler, Kästner's poem "Christmas Carol, Chemically Purified" describes Christmas "not as a festival of joy, but as days in which the children of the poor experience in a special way the injustice and harshness of their social fate". It formulates both accusation and resignation with the means of irony. Through the suffering of the children, Kästner focuses, particularly on the pedagogical aspect. According to Ruth Klüger, Kästner exposes "the hypocrisy of a capitalism obsessed with consumption and pretending to be charitable".

"Chemically Cleaned..." is one of a number of other poems with which Kästner repeatedly addressed the social upheavals in the Weimar Republic. In "Ballade vom Nachahmungstrieb" ("Ballad of the instinct to imitate"), for example, he described the effects of social coldness on children. In "Ansprache an Millionäre" ("Address to Millionaires"), he directly criticised the economic order of the Weimar Republic. The title goes back to the newly introduced dry cleaning, which at the time of the poem's composition had become a general slogan that—applied to a wide variety of areas—stood for particularly thorough cleansing and unveiling of factual circumstances. Kästner's poem is also a reference to the "chemical cleaning".

According to Hermann Kurzke, Kästner himself oscillated between the extremes of poverty and wealth in his youth in Dresden's Äussere Neustadt, between his parents' poor attic flat and the villa of his wealthy uncle Franz Augustin, which the children were only allowed to enter through the servants' entrance up to the kitchen. The experience of the contrasts between rich and poor had shaped Kästner throughout his life and was sometimes idyllic, as in Pünktchen und Anton or Drei Männer im Schnee {Three Men in the Snow), sometimes satirically processed, as in the poem "Weihnachtslied" ("Christmas Carol"), chemically purified. Kästner's companion and first biographer Luiselotte Enderle judged: "Kästner's work and life can be completely traced back to these first milieu experiences."

=== "Left Melancholia" ===
In 1931, Walter Benjamin criticised Kästner's early poetry, including "Weihnachtslied", chemically purified, as "left Melancholia" and "nihilism". The poems were "to the left of the possible in general"; "to enjoy themselves in negativistic calm" was enough for them. "The transformation of the political struggle into an object of pleasure, from a means of production into an article of consumption - that is the last hit of this literature." From Benjamin's point of view, Kästner gagged in his poems "criticism and insight [, which] are within reach, but they would be spoilsports and should not be allowed to have their say under any condition."

Almost 75 years later, Hermann Kurzke agreed with Benjamin's finding of "left-wing melancholy". Although Kästner saw himself as an enlightener who unmasked a mendacious festival and the prevailing injustice, the tone of the poem seemed strangely restrained. It does not move towards an act of liberation or rebellion, but remains apolitical. Kurzke attributed this to Kästner's biographical background. He wanted to be a revolutionary and at the same time was a model pupil. For Kurzke, the poem's message was its moral stance, expressed through the appeals to become clever and proud, to learn for life and to laugh. Ultimately, there was a longing inherent in the poem that the poor children, too, might one day share in the Christmas tree, roast goose and doll, that the poor, too, would one day be given presents by the rich, however unreasonable and improbable this hope might be.

=== Enacted passivity and contradiction ===
Wulf Segebrecht, on the other hand, questioned in 2006 whether Benjamin had not read Kästner's poem closely enough, as he had not recognized the cynical intention behind it. In each stanza, the poem makes a suggestion to children about how to come to terms with their poverty at Christmas:

1. Waiting for a future gift-giving in the distant future,
2. Rejecting gifts that are even harmful,
3. contenting oneself with the public Christmas hullabaloo,
4. superior contempt for the festivities,
5. trust in a God who is responsible for greater dimensions.

All teaching ultimately leads to a persistence in passivity, suggests that children resign themselves to their status rather than rebel.

This repressive instruction is reinforced by Kästner's invented note on the poem: "This poem was purchased by the Reich School Board for the German Unity Reading Book." (in German: "Dieses Gedicht wurde vom Reichsschulrat für das Deutsche Einheitslesebuch angekauft.“) The school board, committed to maintaining public peace and order, is interested in the poor children resigning themselves to their fate rather than rebelling. But this is precisely what exposes the cynicism of the proposals, which the reader is supposed to see through. The reader is stimulated to think about the intentions behind the teachings presented and provoked to contradiction without the poem itself formulating such a contradiction. This contradiction frees Christmas from false sentimentality as well as political instrumentalization; the Christmas carol is "chemically purified" with the means of New Objectivity. About the Children's Report of the German Children's Fund, Segebrecht emphasized the still unbroken topicality of the subject of child poverty almost 80 years after the poem's creation.

=== Publications and adaptations ===
Kästner's "Christmas Carol, Chemically Cleaned" was first published in the 1927 Christmas issue of the journal Das Tage-Buch. In 1928, Kästner included it in his first collection of poems, Herz auf Taille. Thereafter, the poem appeared in an unaltered form in a selection volumes of his works, such as Bei Durchsicht meiner Bücher in 1946 and Kästner für Erwachsene in 1966, and in various anthologies on the theme of Christmas.

Numerous artists have recited or sung the poem. Readings by Hans-Jürgen Schatz, Otto Mellies, Gerd Wameling and Ralf Bauer, for example, have been published. Of an early reading by the actor Alfred Beierle for his short-lived record company Die neue Truppe from autumn 1930, only a broken shellac record exists in the German Historical Museum, which was restored for a recording by the German Broadcasting Archive. Musical interpretations often fell back on the original melody of "Morgen, Kinder, wird's was geben" by Carl Gottlieb Hering, such as that by Gina Pietsch. The composer Marcel Rubin put his own musical setting to the poem. The poem has been recorded for the German Broadcasting Archive. In 2015, Saltatio Mortis set the poem to music on their album Fest der Liebe.

== Editions ==
- Erich Kästner: Herz auf Taille. Mit Zeichnungen von Erich Ohser. Curt Weller, Leipzig 1928 (Erstausgabe). Textgetreuer Neudruck: Atrium, Zürich 1985,3-446-19563-7 ISBN 3-85535-905-9, P. 102–103.
- Erich Kästner: Bei Durchsicht meiner Bücher. Atrium, Zürich 1946, ISBN 3-85535-912-1, Pg. 103–104.
- Erich Kästner: Zeitgenossen haufenweise. Band 1 der Werkausgabe in 9 Bänden. Herausgegeben von Harald Hartung und Nicola Brinkmann. Hanser, München 1998, ISBN 3-446-19563-7, P. 221.

== Bibliography ==
- Hermann Kurzke: Kirchenlied und Kultur. Francke, Tübingen 2010, ISBN 978-3-7720-8378-5 , P. 228–229.
- Karl-Josef Kuschel: Das Weihnachten der Dichter. Große Texte von Thomas Mann bis Reiner Kunze. Neuausgabe, Patmos, Ostfildern 2011 (Erstausgabe 2004), ISBN 978-3-491-72484-6, Pg. 96–97 (Original texts with indexes and interpretations).
- Wulf Segebrecht: Schöne Bescherung! In: Marcel Reich-Ranicki (Hrsg.): Frankfurter Anthologie. Band 29, Insel, Frankfurt am Main 2006, ISBN 3-458-17322-6, P. 167–171.
