= When I Was a Little Boy =

1957 autobiographical children's book by Erich Kästner

- Original German language Als ich ein kleiner Junge war (1960 edition)
- Author: Erich Kästner
- Original title: 'Als ich ein kleiner Junge war'
- Illustrator: Horst Lemke
- Language: German
- Genre: Children's literature, Autobiography
- Publisher: Atrium Verlag
- Publication date: 1957
- Publication place: Germany
- Media type: Print

When I Was a Little Boy (German: Als ich ein kleiner Junge war) is a children's autobiographical memoir by Erich Kästner, originally published in 1957. It earned Kästner the Hans Christian Andersen Award in 1960.

== Summary ==
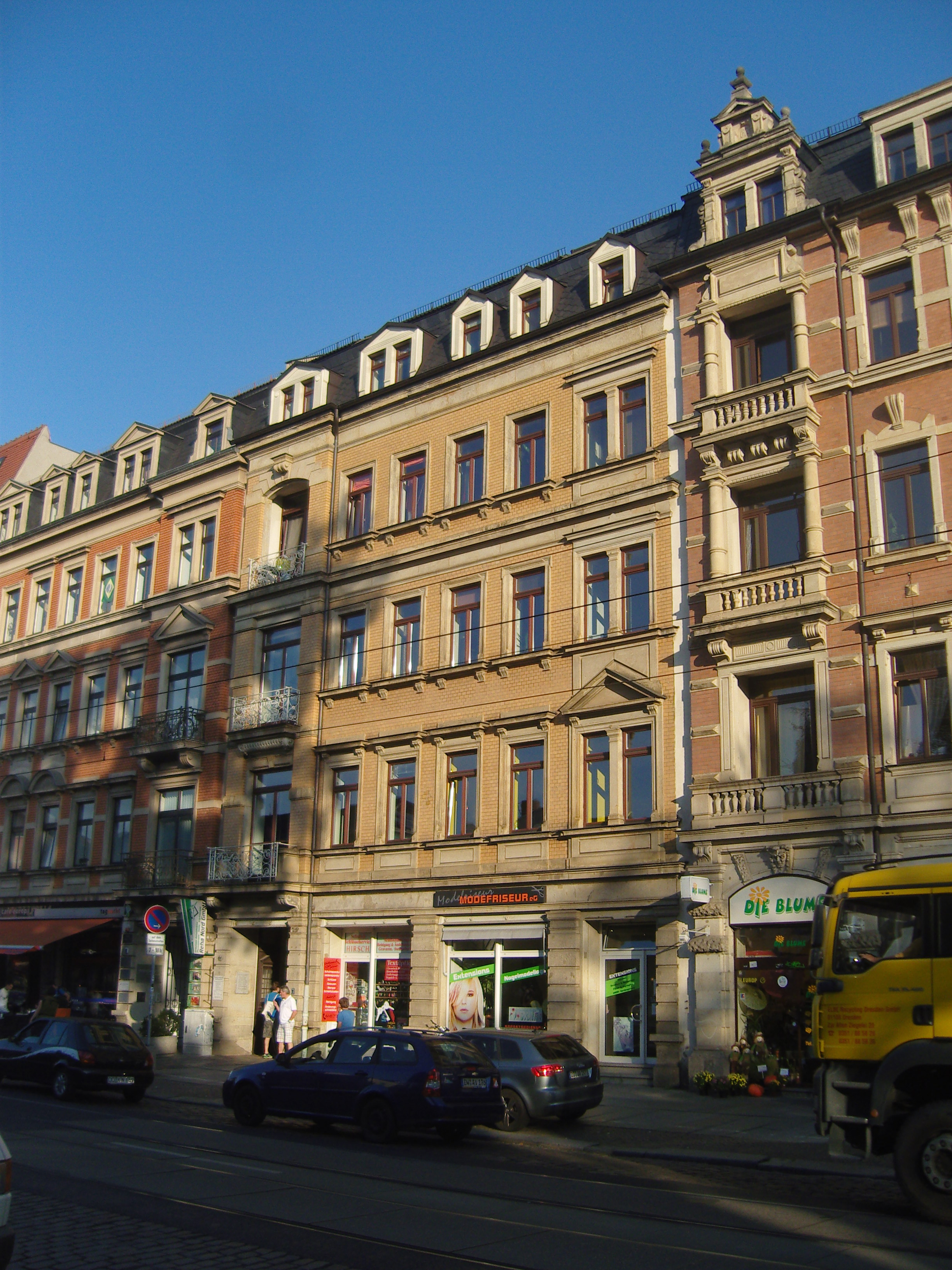
Kästner’s birthplace at Königsbrücker Straße 66 in Dresden

Kästner tells the story of his family and his childhood in Dresden, beginning with his grandparents. He explicitly writes the story for children, repeatedly addressing the readers as "dear children" throughout the book. The account follows a largely chronological order, but Kästner selects particular events and aspects of his life that he considered especially suitable, noting in the foreword that "not everything children experience is suitable for children to read." The book ends with the outbreak of the First World War, which Kästner, who was 15 years old at the time, later regarded as the end of his childhood.

== Themes and references in Kästner's other books ==
When I Was a Little Boy shows that many of Kästner’s other children’s books contain strong autobiographical elements. For example, both Anton in Dot and Anton and Emil in Emil and the Detectives have close relationships with their mothers, just as Kästner did with his own mother, who, like Emil’s, ran a hairdressing business. His mother’s habit of secretly following him to school to ensure his safety was reworked into the story Frau Hebestreit Spies, published in 1962 in his anthology for children titled The Pig at the Barber’s (Das Schwein beim Friseur).

His time as an external pupil at a boarding school, detailed in the book, also influenced works such as The Flying Classroom. Some names of his fictional characters were likewise borrowed from his childhood. For instance, Gustav, a central figure in Emil and the Detectives, was the name of one of Kästner’s best childhood friends, and his elementary school teacher, Herr Bremser, appears as Anton’s understanding teacher in Dot and Anton.

== Publication history ==
The first edition, illustrated by Horst Lemke, was published in 1957 by Swiss publishers Atrium Verlag. The book has been reprinted many times and is currently available from the Hamburg-based Dressler Publishing.

Atrium Verlag also released an audiobook version narrated by Walter Sittler. A radio play adaptation with Martin Held, Stephan Chrzescinski, and Eva Brumby was published by Oetinger Audio.

== Reception ==
When I Was a Little Boy has been praised for its emotional warmth, evocation of early 20th-century Dresden, and its honest portrayal of childhood. The Historical Novel Society commended the memoir for offering “truth, humour, and an evocative glimpse into a lost world,” particularly noting its vivid depiction of Kästner’s pre-World War I childhood and the abrupt end of that era.

In an article for the British literary magazine Slightly Foxed, Sue Gee described the book as "gentle and avuncular, indefinably Germanic," noting its tone is "filled with aphorisms and asides to the reader," and praised its blend of optimism with the occasional touch of melancholy.

== Awards ==
When I Was a Little Boy earned Kästner the prestigious Hans Christian Andersen Award in 1960. In 1961, the book also earned Kästner the Lewis Carroll Shelf Award from the University of Wisconsin–Madison School of Education.

== Editions ==
- Kästner, Erich (1985). Kästner für Kinder. Vol. 1 (Lizenzausgabe des Atrium Verlags Zürich ed.). Weinheim: Büchergilde Gutenberg. pp. 449–597. ISBN 3-7632-3109-9.
- Kästner, Erich (2003). Als ich ein kleiner Junge war. Munich: dtv. ISBN 3-423-13086-5.
