= Fabian (film) =

1980 film

- Directed by: Wolf Gremm
- Written by: Erich Kästner (novel)
- Produced by: Regina Ziegler
- Starring: Hans Peter Hallwachs
- Cinematography: Jürgen Wagner
- Production company: Regina Ziegler Filmproduktion
- Distributed by: United Artists
- Release date: 25 April 1980
- Running time: 110 minutes
- Country: West Germany
- Language: German

Fabian (German pronunciation: [ˈfaːbi̯aːn]) is a 1980 West German drama film directed by Wolf Gremm. It is based on the novel Fabian. Die Geschichte eines Moralisten (1931; German: Fabian. Die Geschichte eines Moralisten, pronounced [ˈfaːbi̯aːn diː ɡəˈʃɪçtə ˈaɪnəs moʁaˈlɪstn̩]) by German author Erich Kästner. The film was chosen as West Germany's official submission to the 53rd Academy Awards for Best Foreign Language Film, but did not receive a nomination.

== Plot ==
The story of Jacob Fabian, a somewhat liberal Berlin advertising copywriter who witnesses the collapse of the prewar German society during the 1930s.

== Cast ==
- Hans Peter Hallwachs as Fabian
- Hermann Lause as Labude
- Silvia Janisch as Cornelia
- Mijanou Van Baarzel as Frau Moll
- Brigitte Mira as Frau Hohlfeld
- Ivan Desny as Justizrat Labude
- Charles Regnier as Erfinder
- Ruth Niehaus as Ruth Relter
- Carola Regnier as Frau Kulp
- Roswitha Lippert as Frau Selow
- Helma Seitz as Fabians Mutter

== See also ==
- List of submissions to the 53rd Academy Awards for Best Foreign Language Film
- List of German submissions for the Academy Award for Best Foreign Language Film
