= Fabian: The Story of a Moralist =

1931 novel by Erich Kästner

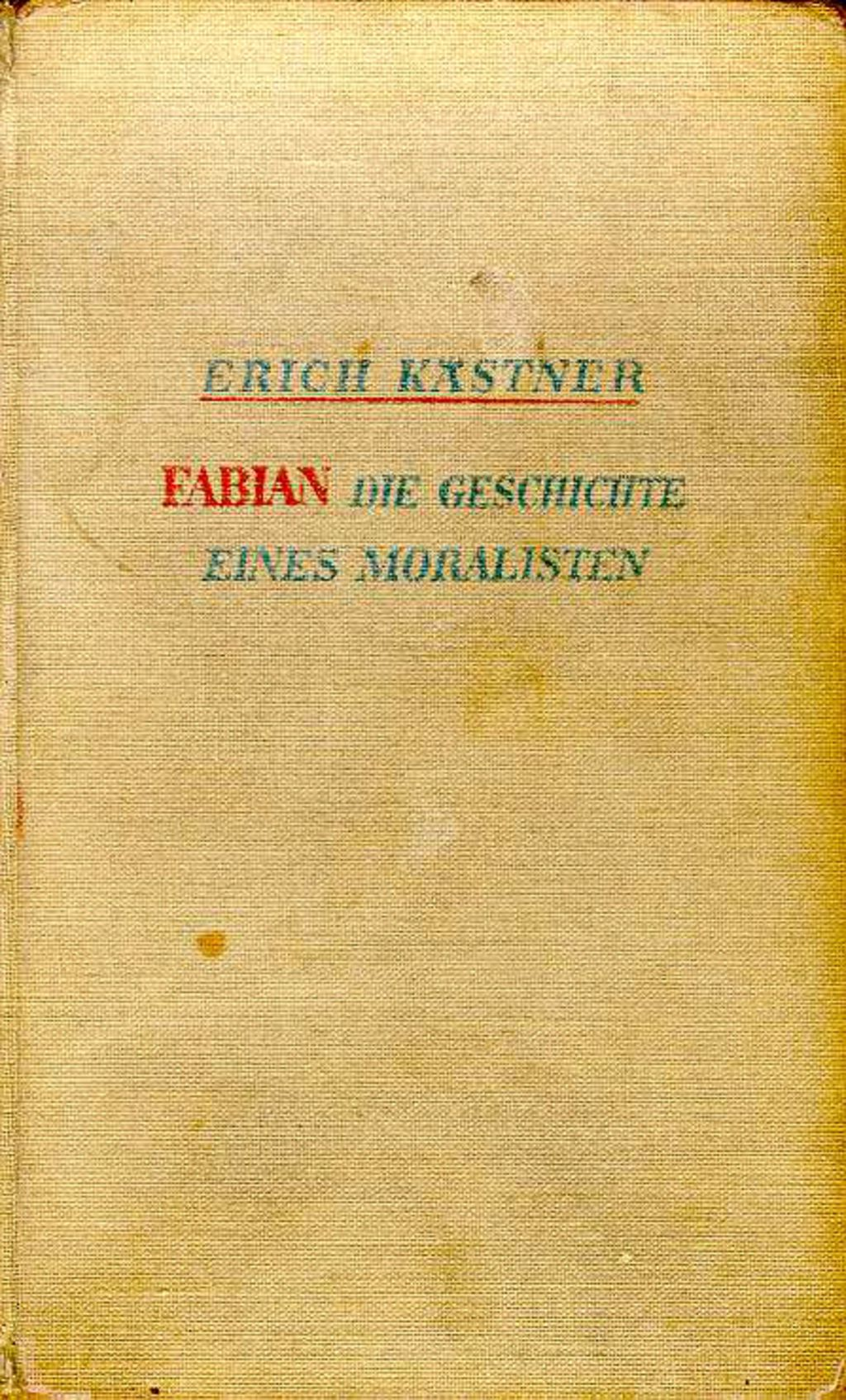
- Cover of the 1931 edition
- Author: Erich Kästner
- Language: German
- Publisher: Deutsche Verlags-Anstalt
- Publication date: 1931

Fabian: The Story of a Moralist (German: Fabian. Die Geschichte eines Moralisten) is a 1931 novel by German author Erich Kästner. An English translation was published by the New York Review Books Classics in 2012 as Going to the Dogs: The Story of a Moralist.

== Plot ==
The novel's protagonist is a Germanist, Dr. Jakob Fabian, who works as a copywriter. The first chapters of the novel deal with Fabian's confrontation with the immorality of Berlin nightlife; he visits brothels, underworld taverns, and artists' studios. In most of these situations, Fabian remains a detached observer who takes ironic note of his surroundings. He is inadvertently drawn into the increasing political polarisation between National Socialists and Communists, and witnesses Berliners engaging in unrestrained sexual hedonism to the exclusion of genuine love.

Over the course of the novel, Fabian becomes a realist. At the start, he is an ironist, who is waiting for the "victory of decency" (German: Sieg der Anständigkeit). However, he is repeatedly disappointed by people, and eventually comes to believe that he can only improve himself. Fabian's friend, Labude, believes that it is possible to enhance mankind morally. Cheated on by his fiancée, Labude seeks comfort in the company of various women but remains largely unhappy.

In an artist's studio, Fabian meets Cornelia Battenberg, who has sworn off relationships after having had negative experiences with men in the past. Fabian approaches her with empathy, whereupon a love affair blossoms between the pair. The relationship has a great impact on Fabian, causing him to develop ambition and seemingly abandon his pessimistic worldview. The day after meeting Cornelia, Fabian loses his job; his former colleague later receives a raise for Fabian's work. Cornelia wants to begin a career as a film actress. She decides to enter into a relationship with a film director to enhance her career, and tries to convince Fabian that this relationship is in both of their best interests. Fabian cannot accept this arrangement and ends the relationship.

The sudden suicide of Labude is another blow for the protagonist. Fabian's friend shoots himself in the head because of the supposed refusal of his habilitation dissertation. The script was never refused, and the rejection letter Labude received was a malevolent prank played on him by his doctoral advisor's assistant. After the death of Labude, Fabian leaves Berlin, returning to his home city of Dresden. He is offered a job at a right-wing newspaper, but his morals prevent him from taking the job. While trying to save a boy who jumped from a bridge into the river, Fabian drowns. The boy can swim, but Fabian cannot.

== Banning ==
The book was published during the rise of Nazism and attracted the special ire of the Nazis. In 1933, most copies were burned on charges of pornography and Kästner was blacklisted from working under his own name, although he continued to write light entertainment under a pseudonym.

== Adaptations ==
=== Television and film ===
- Fabian, a 1980 West German film directed by Wolf Gremm.
- Fabian oder Der Gang vor die Hunde, a 2021 German film directed by Dominik Graf.

=== Theatre ===
Fabian has been adapted three times for the stage; in 2016, a version was staged at the Landestheater Altenburg, and in 2021 a different adaptation titled Fabian oder der Gang vor die Hunde was performed by the Berliner Ensemble. An adaptation by Henrik Kuhlmann premiered on 31 March 2023 at the Staatstheater Darmstadt.
