= Wolf Gremm =

German film director (1942–2015)

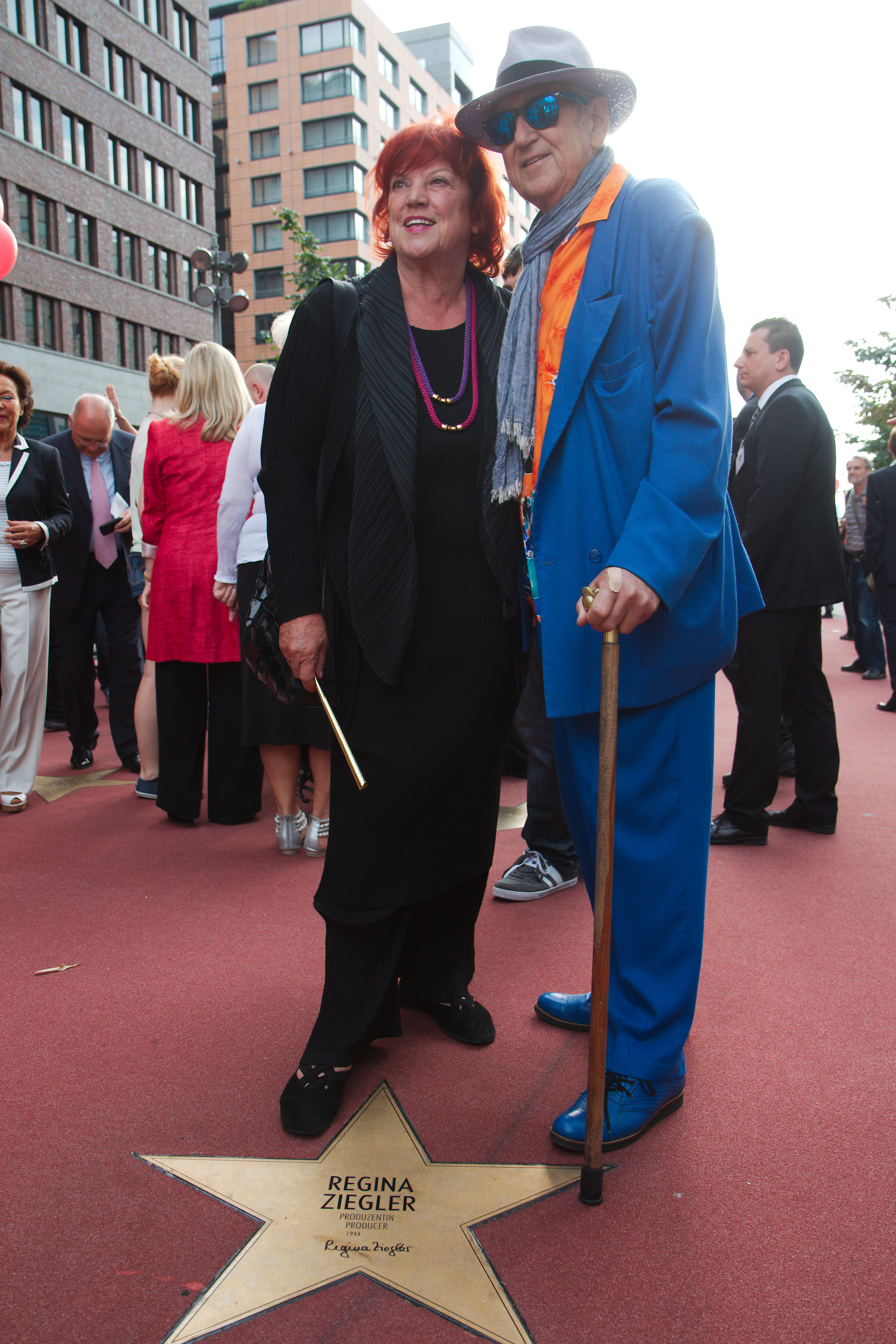
Wolf Gremm

Wolf Gremm (26 February 1942 – 14 July 2015) was a German film director and screenwriter.

Gremm was born in Freiburg im Breisgau in 1942. In the 1960s, he studied German literature, psychology, sociology and theater. After graduation, he studied film direction at the Deutsche Film- und Fernsehakademie Berlin and directed his first feature film Ich dachte, ich wär tot in 1973.

During the 1970s and early 1980s, he produced several feature films. His greatest success was the 1980 film Fabian based on a novel by German author Erich Kästner. This film was chosen as West Germany's official submission to the 53rd Academy Awards for Best Foreign Language Film, but was not nominated.

He was a close friend of the German film director Rainer Werner Fassbinder, who also starred in Gremm's 1982 film Kamikaze 1989.

== Personal life ==
Gremm was married to the film producer Regina Ziegler, who began her career as the producer of Gremm's first feature film Ich dachte, ich wär tot. He died at the age of 73 in Berlin on 14 July 2015 from cancer.

== Selected filmography ==
- Ich dachte, ich wäre tot (1973)
- I'd Like to Have My Troubles (1975)
- Tatort: Tod im U-Bahnschacht (1975, TV)
- The Brothers (1977, based on a short story by Septimus Dale)
- Death or Freedom (1977, loosely based on the play The Robbers)
- Frontiers of Darkness (1979, TV film, based on a novel by Dieter Wellershoff)
- Fabian (1980, based on a novel by Erich Kästner)
- No Terraced House for Robin Hood (1981, based on a novel by Horst Bosetzky)
- After Midnight (1981, based on the novel After Midnight)
- Kamikaze 1989 (1982, based on a novel by Per Wahlöö)
- The Thing at the Door (1983, TV film, based on a novel by Henry Slesar)
- Siggi, the Street Cleaner (1984)
- Fatal Love (1986, TV film, based on a novel by Celia Fremlin)
- The Winter Beach (1988, TV film, based on a short story by Kate Wilhelm)
- Appointment with Yesterday (1988, TV film, based on a novel by Celia Fremlin)
- The Sparrow Murderer (1989, TV film, based on a novel by Jürgen Breest)
- I Want to Live (1990, TV film, sequel to The Winter Beach)
- Pray for Ricki Forster (1991, TV film, based on a novel by Jane Johnston)
- Die Spur führt ins Verderben (1993, TV film, based on a novel by Julian Symons)
- Cliffs of the Death (1993, TV film, based on a novel by Celia Fremlin)
- Californian Quartet (1995, TV miniseries, based on a novel by Dieter Zimmer)
- Inka Connection (1995, TV film, based on a novel by Peter Breitwieser)
- The Hours before Dawn (1997, TV film, based on a novel by Celia Fremlin)
- Only a Dead Man Is a Good Man (1999, TV film, based on a novel by Gaby Hauptmann)
- Angels' Sin (1999, TV film, based on a novel by Charlotte Link)
- A Depraved Couple (2000, TV film, based on a novel by Andreas Anatol)
- Nancy & Frank – A Manhattan Love Story (2002, based on a novel by Hans Werner Kettenbach)
- Deadly Rendezvous (2002, TV film, based on a novel by Christoph Gottwald)
- One Lover Is Not Enough (2002, TV film, based on a novel by Gaby Hauptmann)
- Loving and Killing (2006, TV film, based on a novel by Barbara Wilde)
- The Lake of Dreams (2006, TV film, based on the novel On Mystic Lake by Kristin Hannah)
- Island of Light (2008, TV film, based on the novel Summer Island by Kristin Hannah)
- All the Longing in the World (2009, TV film)
- Who Dares to Love (2010, TV film, based on the novel Between Sisters by Kristin Hannah)
- Journey of Life (2011, TV film, based on a novel by Ruth Maria Kubitschek)
- Summer Light (2011, TV film, based on the novel Facing the Light by Adèle Geras)
- Das Mädchen aus dem Regenwald (2011, TV film, based on a novel by Kristin Hannah)
- Wolf at the Door (2015) (video diary / documentary)
