= Paradise for Three =

1938 film by Edward Buzzell

- Lobby card
- Directed by: Edward Buzzell
- Written by: George Oppenheimer; Harry Ruskin; Dalton Trumbo (uncredited); Gladys Unger (uncredited); Irma von Cube (uncredited)
- Based on: Three Men in the Snow; 1934 novel by Erich Kästner
- Produced by: Sam Zimbalist
- Starring: Frank Morgan; Robert Young; Mary Astor; Florence Rice
- Cinematography: Leonard Smith; Charles Lawton Jr. (uncredited)
- Edited by: Elmo Veron
- Music by: Edward Ward
- Production company: Metro-Goldwyn-Mayer
- Distributed by: Loew's, Inc.
- Release date: June 4, 1938
- Running time: 78 minutes
- Country: United States
- Language: English
- Budget: $359,000
- Box office: $751,000

Paradise for Three, titled Romance for Three in the United Kingdom, is a 1938 American romantic comedy film starring Frank Morgan as a wealthy industrialist who learns about his Austrian workers by surreptitiously living among them. It was adapted from Erich Kästner's novel Three Men in the Snow, published in 1934.

Paradise for Three is the third of several film adaptations of Kästner's novel. It was preceded by the French film A Rare Bird in 1935. Other films bearing the title of the novel were released in 1936, 1955 and 1974.

== Cast ==
- Frank Morgan as Rudolph Tobler / "Edward Schultz", industrialist
- Robert Young as Fritz Hagedorn, contest winner
- Mary Astor as Irene Mallebre, gold-digging divorcee
- Florence Rice as Hilde Tobler / "Hilde Schultz", Rudolph's daughter
- Edna May Oliver as Julia Kunkel, Tobler's housekeeper
- Reginald Owen as Johann Kesselhut, Tobler's butler
- Herman Bing as Mr. Polter, bell captain
- Henry Hull as Sepp, kitchen worker
- Sig Ruman as Karl Bold (as Sig Rumann), hotel manager
- Walter Kingsford as William Reichenbach, Tobler's assistant

== Reception ==
In a contemporary review for The New York Times, critic Frank S. Nugent called Paradise for Three "a light, slight and agile farce, something in the nature of a dividend from a Metro preferred stock company" and "a genial show."

According to MGM records, the film earned $421,000 in the U.S. and Canada and $330,000 elsewhere, resulting in a profit of $118,000.
