= A Rare Bird =

1935 film by Richard Pottier

- Directed by: Richard Pottier
- Written by: Jacques Prévert
- Based on: Three Men in the Snow by Erich Kästner
- Produced by: Oscar Dancigers
- Starring: Pierre Brasseur; Max Dearly; Monique Rolland
- Cinematography: Jean Bachelet; Charles Bauer
- Edited by: Pierre Méguérian
- Music by: Henri Poussigue
- Production company: Mega Films
- Distributed by: Les Films Roussillon
- Release date: 7 June 1935
- Running time: 90 minutes
- Country: France
- Language: French

A Rare Bird (French: Un oiseau rare) is a 1935 French comedy film directed by Richard Pottier and starring Pierre Brasseur, Max Dearly and Monique Rolland. The film's sets were designed by the art directors Robert Hubert and Jacques Krauss. It is based on the 1934 novel Three Men in the Snow by Erich Kästner.

== Synopsis ==
A millionaire and a craftsman both win a competition to design a new slogan and win a stay at a hotel in a ski resort, but a series of misunderstandings lead to the two being confused for each other.

== Cast ==
- Pierre Brasseur as Jean Berthier
- Max Dearly as Melleville
- Monique Rolland as Renée
- Charles Dechamps as Le directeur de l'hôtel
- Jean Tissier as Mascaret
- Madeleine Guitty as Léonie
- Henri Vilbert as Grégoire
- Claire Gérard as Mme Berthier
- Pierre Larquey as Valentin
- Marcel Duhamel as Le baron Tourtau
- Madeleine Suffel as La baronne Tourtau
- Anthony Gildès as Le sourd
- Léon Arvel as Broux
- Carlos Avril
- Lou Bonin
- Marguerite de Morlaye as La danseuse au bal masué
- Geno Ferny as Le membre du conseil d'administration
- Georges Jamin as Un montagnard
- Liliane Lesaffre as L'aubergiste
- Maurice Marceau as Le danseur au chalet
- Pierre Sabas

== See also ==
- Three Men in the Snow (1936)
- Paradise for Three (1938)
- Three Men in the Snow (1955)
- Three Men in the Snow (1974)

== Bibliography ==
- Goble, Alan. The Complete Index to Literary Sources in Film. Walter de Gruyter, 1999.
- Parish, James Robert. Film Actors Guide. Scarecrow Press, 1977.
