= Naussac =

Naussac is the name of two communes in France:

- Naussac, in the Aveyron department
- Naussac, in the Lozère department
