= Annaluise & Anton =

1999 film

- Theatrical release poster
- Directed by: Caroline Link
- Based on: Dot and Anton by Erich Kästner
- Starring: Elea Geissler; Max Felder
- Music by: Niki Reiser
- Production companies: Bavaria Filmverleih- und Produktions-GmbH; Lunaris Film
- Distributed by: Buena Vista International
- Release dates: 21 February 1999 (BIFF); 11 March 1999 (Germany)
- Running time: 1h 47min
- Country: Germany
- Language: German

Annaluise & Anton (German: Pünktchen und Anton) is a 1999 German family film based on the eponymous children's book by Erich Kästner. A previous version Anna Louise and Anton was made in 1953.

== Cast ==
- Elea Geissler - Annaluise
- Max Felder - Anton
- Juliane Köhler - Bettina Pogge
- August Zirner - Richard Pogge
- Meret Becker - Elli Gast
- Sylvie Testud - Laurence
- Gudrun Okras - Dicke Bertha
- Benno Fürmann - Carlos
