= Fontane =

Fontane is a surname of Italian origin, meaning fountain. The name may refer to:

- Char Fontane (1952–2007), American actress
- The Fontane Sisters (active 1941–1961), American singing trio
- Theodor Fontane (1819–1898), German novelist and poet
- Tony Fontane (1925–1974), American gospel singer

== See also ==
- Lynn Fontanne (1887–1983), English actress
- Fontaine (disambiguation)
- Fontanes (disambiguation)
- Fontanet (disambiguation)
