= Dot and Anton =

1931 children's book by Erich Kästner

Dot and Anton (German:Pünktchen und Anton) is a children's book by Erich Kästner that was published in 1931.

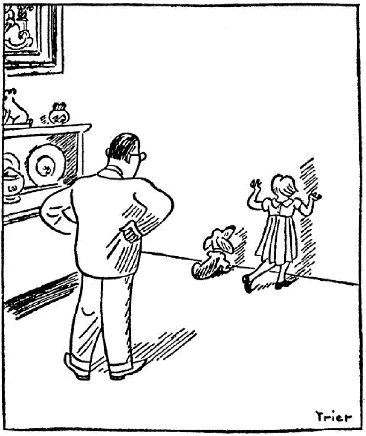
Walter Trier: Dot stood in front of the wall and curtsied

== Plot ==
The novel is about the girl Luise Pogge, called Dot, who lives in Berlin with her wealthy parents, and about the boy Anton Gast, whose standard of living is far below that of Dot. Anton lives alone with his sick mother in a very small apartment. He has to earn money and help his mother do chores all while also going to school in order to make ends meet.

Dot lives in a large apartment with her little brown Dachshund Piefke, the cook Berta, the governess Miss Andacht and her parents: Fritz Pogge the walking-stick factory director and his wife, who both barely spend any time with her.

Even though her parents are quite well off, Dot has to go begging with Miss Andacht without her parents' knowledge because Miss Andacht's dubious fiancé Robert extorts money from her. While begging, she meets Anton, who also begs. However, he begs out of genuine need as his mother recently had a serious surgery and thus can't provide for the family. In spite of Anton and Dot being from different backgrounds, they become close friends and spend a lot of time together.

The climax of the story is made of Robert's attempt to break into the Pogge family's apartment. For this purpose, he has had his fiancée draw a map of the apartment and has acquired the keys. Anton, who has witnessed the handing over of the keys, warns Berta. She notifies the police, but the burglar arrives before them and is knocked unconscious by Berta with a club upon entering the apartment. At the same time, Dot and Miss Andacht get caught begging by Mr and Mrs Pogge. The governess then flees and the Pogge family returns home where they not only meet the housekeeper but also the police and the arrested burglar, who Dot identifies as Miss Andacht's fiancé. He is taken away by the police, and the others go to sleep.

Dot's father recognizes his social responsibility and that he had neglected his daughter. Therefore, Anton and his mother are allowed to move in with the Pogges. Anton's mother takes the place of Miss Andacht, who had fled after the attempted burglary.

Between the chapters of the story, Kästner has included so-called "afterthoughts", in which he addresses ethical questions based on details of the story.

== Adaptations ==
=== Movies ===
- Annaluise and Anton (1953) – directed by Thomas Engel, starring Hertha Feiler, Paul Klinger and Jane Tilden
- Pünktchen und Anton (1958) – directed by Jörg Schneider, starring Gerda Rist, Paul Bühlmann, Alice Brüngger, Lotte Berlinger
- Annaluise & Anton (1999)– directed by Caroline Link, starring Elea Geissler, Max Felder, Juliane Köhler, August Zirner and Meret Becker

=== Children's opera ===
The children's opera Pünktchen und Anton with music by Iván Eröd and a libretto by Thomas Höft, had its premiere on May 8, 2010, in a production by Matthias von Stegmann in the Vienna State Opera.
