= Paul Klinger =

German actor (1907–1971)

Paul Karl Heinrich Klinksik (14 June 1907, Essen – 14 November 1971, Munich) was a German stage and film actor who also worked in radio drama and soundtrack dubbing.

== Family life ==
His father, a civil engineer, was Karl Heinrich Klinksik; his mother was Gertrud Emma Mathilde (née) Uhlendahl. He was first married from 1936 to 1945 to the actress Hildegard Wolf with whom he had one child. There were two more children from his second marriage in 1950 to Karin Anderson, another actress. Paul Klinger and Karin Andersen, twenty years his junior, met during the filming of a crime thriller in 1950 when she was working on the set as a stills photographer. They would later appear together in two of the Immenhof films, Hochzeit auf Immenhof, 1956 and Ferien auf Immenhof, 1957.

== Education and career ==
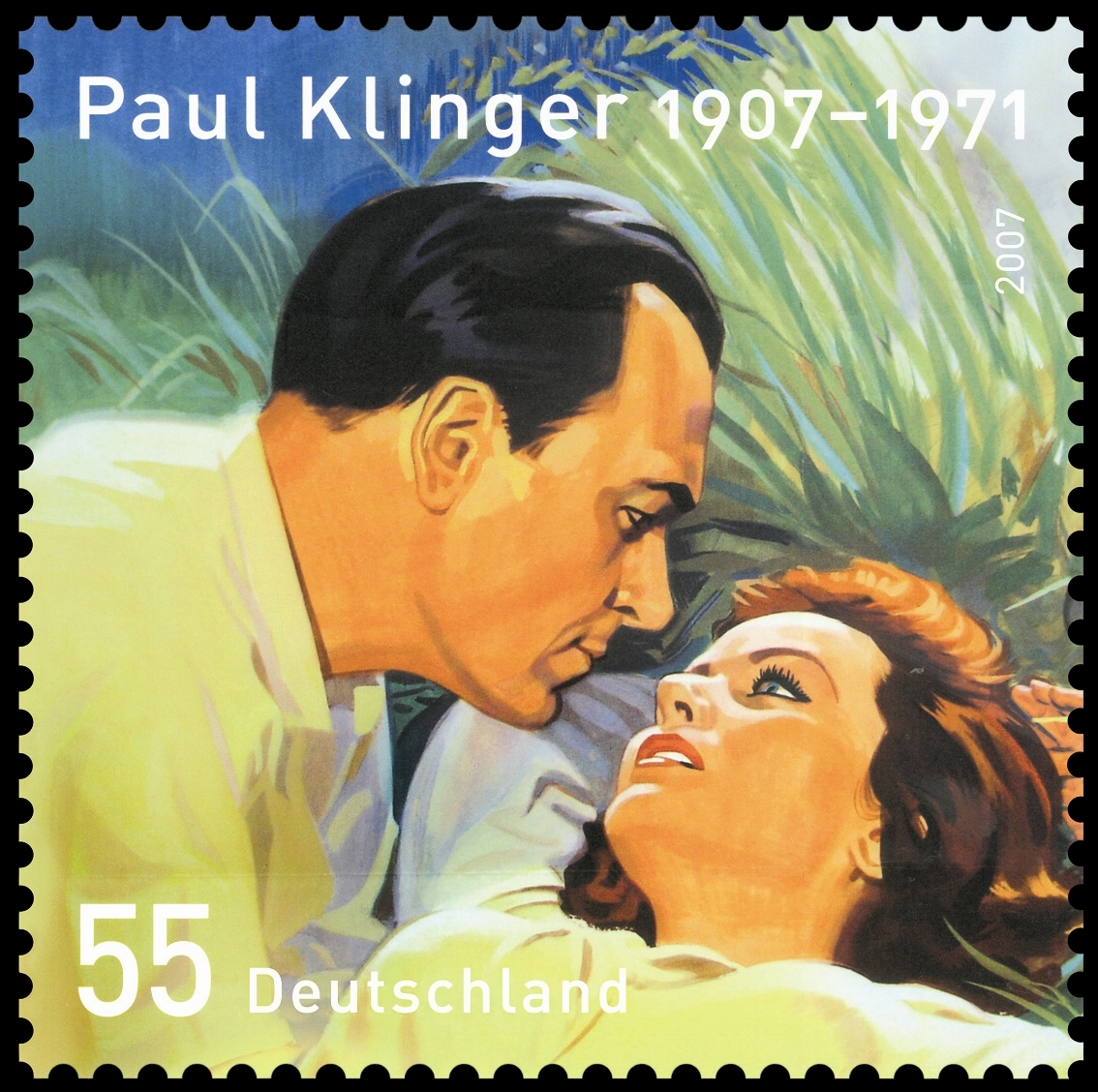
Paul Klinger and Nadia Gray; 2007 stamp based on the poster to the 1956 film Hengst Maestoso Austria

Klinger's secondary education was at the Helmholtz-Realgymnasium, which he attended to Abitur level taking part in amateur dramatic productions with his friend, Helmut Käutner. However, his father was opposed to any idea of a career in the theatre and sent him to the Technische Hochschule München (Technical University of Munich), where he once again met up with his old school friend Helmut Käutner. The latter persuaded him to change from architecture to a theatrical course. He completed six semesters, he and his friend working as extras at the Otto-Falckenberg Schauspielhaus. The death of his father meant that he could no longer afford to study, and he accordingly decided to become a professional actor.

=== Theatre ===
One of his first engagements was at the Bayerische Landesbühne (a travelling theatre) – and from 1929 at theatres in Koblenz, Oldenburg, Düsseldorf and Breslau – where his powerful and distinctive voice landed him major parts for which he was really too young. Things were to change in 1933 when the director Heinz Hilpert took him to the Deutsches Theater in Berlin, where he was cast in the roles of young heroes, as was the case with a production of Uta von Naumberg in which he appeared with Käthe Dorsch. He would remain in theatre in Berlin until 1948, appearing not only at the Deutsches Theater but also at the Komische Oper, the Theater am Kurfürstendamm, the Hebbeltheater, the Schloßpark-Theater and in comedy.

=== Early films ===
In Breslau, under the direction of his cousin, Karl-Heinz Uhlendahl, he passed some television screen tests and began his film career in 1933 with Du sollst nicht begehren (Thou Shalt not Covet), which landed him simultaneous contracts with the then biggest German studios Ufa, Terra Film and Tobis. His second film was Männer vor der Ehe in 1936, this to be followed by numerous roles in other films. As for his film work during the period of the Third Reich, the theatrical director Hellmuth Matiasek commented: "His appearance and manner – evoking pre-war salons rather than the trenches of the Eastern Front – spared him from productions commissioned by Joseph Goebbels and he played in classics by Goethe, Theodor Storm and Fontane." A short film made early in the war, Barbara, did not get past the censor: in this he played the soldier husband of Lotte Werkmeister. However, when he was sent to the front, his wife would find fulfilment with a job on the railway. In the NS-inspired war film, Spähtrupp Hallgarten, directed by Herbert B Fredersdorf, Klinger comes across as boyish, eye-winking and at times foolhardy.

=== Post war films ===
He had other film parts after the Second World War, reaching the peak of his popularity in the 1950s in films of Erich Kästner novels such as Anna Louise and Anton and The Flying Classroom, as well as others in the Heimatfilm genre of the Immenhof trilogy. In the latter, Klinger, in the role of Jochen von Roth, is an amiable, substitute father-figure who manages to turn the impoverished farm into a successful pony-trekking centre.

=== Dubbing ===
As early as 1943, Klinger was involved in film dubbing. In the 1950s and 60s he was one of the busiest dubbing actors in the German film industry, speaking the parts of many well known actors including Charlton Heston, Bing Crosby (12 times), Jean Gabin, Cary Grant, Humphrey Bogart, Stewart Granger, William Holden and Tyrone Power.

=== TV and radio ===
From the early 1960s, he was seen less frequently on the big screen but embarked on a television career where he became known to a wide audience in the six-part WDR blockbuster, Tim Frazer by Francis Durbridge, and the ZDF police series, Kommissar Brahm.

In addition to his work for theatre, film and television, Klinger appeared from 1940 onwards in numerous German radio dramas. In 1967 he took over the title role, which had been played by René Deltgen, in the twelfth and final episode of the famous Paul Temple radio series, Paul Temple und der Fall Alex (Paul Temple and the Alex Affair) by Francis Durbridge. Like almost all the other broadcasts in the series, this WDR production was released on a CD. In the eleventh episode (1966) Paul Temple und der Fall Genf(Paul Temple and the Geneva Mystery), he was heard not in the title role but as Maurice Lonsdale.

== Death and honours ==
Paul Klinger, who appeared in over 70 films, died in Munich on 14 November 1971 from a heart attack while he was attending a meeting of the Bundesfachgruppe der Film- und Fernsehschaffenden of the Deutsche Angestellten-Gewerkschaft. He is buried in the cemetery at Söcking near Starnberg.

In 1974, the non-profit association ‘Paul Klinger Künstlersozialwerk e.V.’ (Paul Klinger Artist Welfare-Aid Foundation) was founded to honour his work for disadvantaged artists.

On the anniversary of his birth in 2007, Germany honoured Paul Klinger with a commemorative postage stamp that had a print-run of ten million. The stamp was launched at a ceremony on 14 June 2007 by the Paul-Klinger-Künstlersozialwerkes e.V. at Höhenried Castle on Lake Starnberg in the presence of his family and former colleagues, the latter including Sonja Ziemann, Ernst Stankovski, Kurt Weinzierl, Mady Rahl und Eva-Ingeborg Scholz.

A road is named after him in his birthplace, Essen. It is located in the Essen-Westviertel district, close to the Colosseum Theatre on land where once stood factory premises of the firm Friedrich Krupp AG.

== Selected filmography ==
- 1933: Du sollst nicht begehren (Blut und Scholle) as Lutz, der Soldat
- 1935: Liebesleute
- 1936: Männer vor der Ehe as Fritz Hallborn - Kaufmann
- 1936: Fridericus as von Bonin
- 1937: Das schöne Fräulein Schragg as Ludwig Krüll
- 1937: Crooks in Tails as Conny Parker
- 1937: Zweimal zwei im Himmelbett as Veit Schöpflin
- 1937: Adventure in Warsaw as Henry de Fontana - Gesandtschaftsrat
- 1938: Wie einst im Mai as Georg von Uhlendorff
- 1938: Großalarm as Paul Köppen
- 1938: Fools in the Snow as Toni Notnagel
- 1938: Two Women as Werner Bruck
- 1938: Adventure in Love as Tom
- 1938: Das Verlegenheitskind as Bartel Vierköttel
- 1939: Ich bin gleich wieder da as Nicolas Mohr
- 1939: Morgen werde ich verhaftet as Dr. Walter Felden
- 1939: Sommer, Sonne, Erika as Werner Meck
- 1940: Commissioner Eyck as Günter Eyck, Kriminalkommissar
- 1940: Herzensfreud – Herzensleid as Paul, beider Sohn
- 1940: Alarm as Herbert Flügger
- 1941: Spähtrupp Hallgarten as Sepp Eberle
- 1942: Erbin vom Rosenhof as Mathias Summerer
- 1942: Die goldene Stadt as Ingenieur Christian Leidwein
- 1943: Back Then as Pablo (voice, uncredited)
- 1943: Circus Renz as Harms
- 1943: Immensee as Erich Jürgens
- 1943: Wenn die Sonne wieder scheint as Ludwig Termöhlen - beider Sohn
- 1944: Seinerzeit zu meiner Zeit as Reichling
- 1944: Life Calls as Paul Warkentin
- 1944: The Green Salon as Wolf Termöhl, cand.arch.
- 1947: Marriage in the Shadows as Hans Wieland
- 1948: Everything Will Be Better in the Morning as Dr. Axel Robert, Rundfunk-Regisseur
- 1949: Encounter with Werther as Albert
- 1949: Don't Play with Love as Walter Ulrich / Wupp
- 1950: Ich glaube an Dich (Mathilde Möhring) as Hans Ribbeck (Premiere 1950)
- 1950: Vier Treppen rechts (Zimmer zu vermieten as Dr. Jürgen Wenter (Premiere 1950)
- 1950: Sensation in Savoy as Andreas Behrend
- 1950: Die Nacht ohne Sünde as Herr Heinrich Böckmann
- 1951: Falschmünzer am Werk as Inspektor Braun
- 1951: The Secret of a Marriage (Talent zum Glück) as Paul Brugger
- 1951: Mutter sein dagegen sehr! as Kurt May - Architekt
- 1951: Das späte Mädchen
- 1952: Don't Ask My Heart as Paul Gerber
- 1952: Mikosch Comes In as Tibor von Köröd
- 1952: At the Well in Front of the Gate as Kurt Kramer
- 1953: Prosecutor Corda as Hans Neidhard
- 1953: Anna Louise and Anton as Herr Pogge
- 1953: When the White Lilacs Bloom Again as Peter Schroeder
- 1953: Wedding in Transit as Herr von Rupp
- 1954: Rose-Girl Resli as Dr. Schumann
- 1954: The Seven Dresses of Katrin as Dr. Peter Schörg
- 1954: The Flying Classroom as Der Nichtraucher
- 1954: Bon Voyage as Mr. van Mühlen
- 1955: The Immenhof Girls as Jochen von Roth
- 1955: Operation Sleeping Bag as Hauptmann Brack
- 1955: My Leopold as Rudolf Starke
- 1955: Son Without a Home as Dr. Friedlieb
- 1955: Lost Child 312 as Dr. Richard Gothe
- 195?: Hände und Hebel as Narrator
- 1956: The Bath in the Barn as Bürgermeister Hendrick
- 1956: Hengst Maestoso Austria as Georg Hochleitner
- 1956: Hochzeit auf Immenhof as Jochen von Roth
- 1956: The Old Forester House as Paul Kramer
- 1957: Glücksritter as Peter Harmsen
- 1957: Ferien auf Immenhof as Jochen von Roth
- 1958: South Seas Adventure as Supplemental Narrator (German Version) (voice)
- 1958: Liebe kann wie Gift sein as Geistlicher
- 1958: Ist Mama nicht fabelhaft? as Albert Horn
- 1958: Sebastian Kneipp as Dr. Baumgarten
- 1959: Rommel Calls Cairo as Field Marshal Erwin Rommel
- 1961: Ich kann nicht länger schweigen as Dr. Günther Behrens
- 1963: Tim Frazer (TV Series) as Dr. Killick
- 1963: The White Spider as Inspector Dawson
- 1963: Jack and Jenny as Jonas
- 1963: Unterm Birnbaum (adapted from Theodor Fontane) (TV Movie) as Justizrat Vohwinkel
- 1963: Der Parasit (TV Movie) as Narbonne
- 1964: The Inn on Dartmoor as Inspektor Cromwell
- 1964: Das Kriminalmuseum: Der Fahrplan (TV Series) as Herbert Forster
- 1964: Paul Klinger erzählt abenteuerliche Geschichten (TV Series short)
- 1964: Freddy, Tiere, Sensationen as Tompson
- 1965: Red Dragon as Norman
- 1966: Conan Doyle und der Fall Edalji (TV Movie) as Sir Arthur Conan Doyle
- 1966-1967: Familie Hansen (TV Series) as Axel Hansen
- 1967: Kommissar Brahm (TV Series) as Kommissar Brahm
- 1969: Tagebuch eines Frauenmörders (TV Movie) as Kriminalrat Rose
- 1970: Pim, Pam und Pummelchen as Narrator
- 1970: Dreißig Silberlinge (TV Movie) as Mr. Hammeker
- 1971: Kirsch und Kern (TV Movie) as Otto Kern
- 1971: Hochwürden drückt ein Auge zu as Narrator (uncredited)
- 1971: ...und heute heißt es Show as Singer

== Radio drama ==
- 1946: Torquato Tasso (adapted from Johann Wolfgang von Goethe) – Director: Hannes Küpper
- 1946: Tobby - Director: Hanns Korngiebe
- 1947: Schicksalswende – Director: Hanns Korngiebel
- 1948: Der Mann mit dem Splitter - Director: unknown
- 1952: Sieg über das Dunkel (Filmmitschnitt) - Director: unknown
- 1952: Wehe dem, der nichts geleistet hat – Director: Eduard Hermann
- 1952: They never come back – Author: Kurt Brumme – Director: Hermann Pfeiffer
- 1955: Der Fremde kam um Mitternacht – Director: Peter Glas
- 1957: Die Büchse Münchhausens – Director: Egon Monk
- 1958: Der schwarze Schwan – Director: Erich Köhler
- 1960: Die Galoschen des Unglücks – Director: Raoul Wolfgang Schnell
- 1960: Das Gartenfest – Director: Peter Schulze-Rohr
- 1962: Die verlorene Stimme – Director: Otto Kurth
- 1963: Der Entartete – Director: Hans Lietzau
- 1963: Das Steckenpferd – Director: Otto Kurth
- 1963: Zwischenfall beim Maskenball – Director: Hermann Pfeiffer
- 1963: Ein blinder Spiegel – Director: :Friedhelm Ortmann
- 1963: Der Reifenstecher – Director: Manfred Brückner
- 1964: Tistou mit dem grünen Daumen – Director: Robert Bichler
- 1964: Durch die Wüste (adapted from Karl May) – Director: Manfred Brückner
- 1965: Ellen – Director: Heinz-Günter Stamm
- 1965: Noch eine Nacht – Director: Rolf von Goth
- 1965: Die Glocken von Bicêtre – Director: Gert Westphal
- 1965: Das ist nicht in Tedeles Sinn – Director: Manfred Brückner
- 1965: Der Berg – Director: Miklós Konkoly
- 1965: Die Prinzessin und die Hexe – Director: Leopold Reinecke
- 1966: Heinrich Schliemann – Director: Hermann Pfeiffer
- 1966: Paul Temple und der Fall Genf – Director: Otto Düben
- 1966: Heimgefunge – Regie: Heinz Dieter Köhler
- 1966: Konsultation – Director: not stated
- 1967: Gespräche im All – Director: Ulrich Lauterbach
- 1967: Modell meiner kleinen Stadt – Director: Jiri Horcicka
- 1967: Die Marne bei Charenton – Director: Klaus Mehrländer
- 1968: Paul Temple und der Fall Alex – Director: Otto Düben
- 1968: Schlafwagenabteil – Director: Peter Albrecht Stiller
- 1968: Spaziergang im Park – Director: Oswald Döpke
- 1969: Die Fünf-Uhr-Marquise – Director: Otto Düben
- 1969: Die Parzen – Director: Hermann Wenninger
- 1972: Professor Mancinis Geheimnis – Director: Ulrich Lauterbach
