= Helma Seitz =

German actress (1913–1995)

- Born: 23 February 1913; Offenbach am Main, German Empire
- Died: 11 July 1995 (aged 82); Cologne, Germany
- Occupation: Actress
- Years active: 1962–1988

Helma Seitz (23 February 1913 – 11 July 1995) was a German actress. She appeared in twenty-six films and television shows between 1962 and 1988.

== Filmography ==
Year	Title	Role	Notes
1962	Escape from East Berlin	Frau Jürgens	
1967	Der Tod läuft hinterher	Agentursekretärin	Episode: "Zweiter Teil"
1968	Babeck	Agathe	Episode: "Ein Sarg aus Genua"
1972	Alexander Zwo	Melanie Friedberg	Episode: "Gefährliche Heimkehr"
1973	Libero	Schwester Irene	
1980	Fabian	Fabians Mutter	
