= Theater Die Kleine Freiheit =

Defunct theatre in Munich, Bavaria, Germany (1951–1996)

Coordinates: 48°08′19″N 11°35′02″E

Theater Die Kleine Freiheit was a theatre in Munich, Bavaria, Germany. It was closed in November 1996.

The cabaret presented its first program at the Atelier Theater in Elisabethstrasse on January 24-25, 1951. The main author was the writer Erich Kästner, while Kolman directed. The performers were mainly employees of the former cabaret "Die Schaubude," including Ursula Herking, Oliver Hassencamp and Bum Krüger.
