= Three Men in the Snow (1974 film) =

Drei Männer im Schnee Three Men in the Snow
- Directed by: Alfred Vohrer
- Written by: Manfred Purzer
- Based on: Three Men in the Snow; 1934 novel by Erich Kästner
- Produced by: Luggi Waldleitner
- Starring: Klaus Schwarzkopf; Roberto Blanco; Thomas Fritsch
- Cinematography: Charly Steinberger
- Edited by: Ingeborg Taschner
- Music by: Peter Thomas
- Production company: Roxy Film
- Distributed by: Constantin Film
- Release date: 13 March 1974
- Running time: 92 minutes
- Country: Germany
- Language: German

Three Men in the Snow (German: Drei Männer im Schnee) is a 1974 German comedy film directed by Alfred Vohrer and starring Klaus Schwarzkopf, Roberto Blanco and Thomas Fritsch. It is an adaptation of the novel of the same title by Erich Kästner.

== Plot ==
The wealthy and eccentric Tobler, a Geheimrat and owner of various businesses, enters and wins a competition started by one of his businesses. Using the pseudonym Schlüter he wins the second prize: a ten-day stay at the luxurious Grand Hotel in Bruckbeuren in the Alps.

The first prize is won by Dr. Fritz Hagedorn, an unemployed copywriter, who lives with his widowed mother and scrapes by on occasional work.

Before claiming the prize, Tobler transforms himself into Schlüter and assumes the persona of a poor man. His intention is to carry out a sociological study. Tobler buys old, worn-out, tattered clothes, and manages to pass himself off as destitute. However, as a Geheimrat, he is both practical and pragmatic, and seeks to assure that he still retains access to his everyday luxuries. Thus, he orders his butler, Johann Kesselhut, to take accommodations at same hotel acting as a wealthy man who has no relation to Schlüter.

Tobler's daughter Hilde does not like the idea, the arrangements, and these plans. She shares her unease with their longtime housekeeper, frau Kunkel, and they decide that Hilde should warn the management of the hotel of her father's plan. But, as a comedy as this is, when Hilde phones the hotel's management, the faulty telephone lines scramble the message. The hotel's management therefore considers the unemployed and destitute copywriter Dr. Hagedorn, the first prize winner, as the wealthy man living in disguise and decide to treat him lavishly. Schlüter, who looks and acts poor, must sleep in a small attic room, without heating, harassed by the staff and even compelled to do odd jobs. Kesselhut tries to help as much as he can, and ultimately after a few days, decides to inform Hilde. Hagedorn, Schlüter, and Kesselhut nevertheless bond with each other, and Hagedorn and Schlüter become friendly: a young man unaccustomed to luxury shares what he has with the poor, destitute old man.

When Hilde learns how her father is being treated, she immediately travels to the hotel in Bruckbeuren with frau Kunkel acting as her aunt. At the Grand Hotel, she is shocked to experience how her father is being mistreated. And, she falls in love with Hagedorn, not knowing that he also has a “secret”: poverty. The romance between Hilde and Hagedorn blossoms rapidly to the point that they are planning to marry. Yet, after a few additional days Tobler becomes so disgusted with the daily harassment by the hotel that he cannot take it anymore and rapidly returns to Berlin with his daughter, his butler, and the housekeeper. The sudden departure, with no prior notice or information, leaves Hagedorn confused and saddened.

The lovelorn and depressed Hagedorn returns to Berlin to search for Hilde Schlüter. His search is unsuccessful for obvious reasons. But one day Hagedorn is surprised to receive an invitation to dinner from a certain "Tobler" family.

When they arrive, the mystery is revealed and the friendship forged between Tobler, Hagedorn, and Kasselhut strengthens. Hilde identifies herself as Tobler's daughter. Tobler then learns that he already owns the grand hotel - he purchased it and sacked management promptly.

== Themes ==
The story is about male bonding and the comedy of errors cutting across socio-economic lines in the aftermath of the Great Depression, and the rise of the Nazism, in Germany. This book is clearly very apolitical. Kästner was not a favorite of the Nazi cultural elite. His few novels and works he authored at that time, reflect an increasing distance from the day-to-day changes in the public discourse. Throughout the predictable story, Kästner infuses warm humor and creates unusually realistic characters.

== Cast ==
- Klaus Schwarzkopf as Otto Tobler
- Roberto Blanco as Titus
- Thomas Fritsch as Boris Dorfmeister
- Susanne Beck as Susanne Tobler
- Grit Boettcher as Frau Casparius
- Lina Carstens as Frau Tobler
- Elisabeth Volkmann as Frau Mallebré
- Herbert Fleischmann as Zenkel
- Ingrid Steeger as Gundula von Wolzogen
- Fritz Tillmann as Kühne
- Gisela Uhlen as Frau von Wolzogen
- Klaus Grünberg as Ferry
- Franz Muxeneder as Kommissar
- Rainer Basedow as Kellner
- Dieter Augustin as Barmann
- Max Strecker as Eduard Schulze
- Ursula Reit as Wondraschek, Telefonistin
- Benno Hoffmann as Leo Plotte
- Bruno W. Pantel as Richter
- Ulrich Beiger as Prosecutor
- Joachim Hackethal as Mann in Kneipe
- Rolf Castell as Anton

== See also ==
- A Rare Bird (1935)
- Three Men in the Snow (1936)
- Paradise for Three (1938)
- Three Men in the Snow (1955)

== Bibliography ==
- Bock, Hans-Michael & Bergfelder, Tim. The Concise CineGraph. Encyclopedia of German Cinema. Berghahn Books, 2009.
