= Three Men in the Snow (1936 film) =

- Directed by: Vladimír Slavínský
- Written by: Vladimír Slavínský; Otakar Vávra
- Based on: Three Men in the Snow; 1934 novel by Erich Kästner
- Starring: Hugo Haas; Věra Ferbasová; Jindřich Plachta
- Cinematography: Jan Roth
- Edited by: Jiří Slavíček
- Music by: Josef Dobes
- Production company: Metropolitan Film
- Release date: 1936
- Country: Czechoslovakia
- Language: Czech

Three Men in the Snow (Czech: Tři muži ve sněhu) is a 1936 Czech comedy film directed by Vladimír Slavínský and starring Hugo Haas, Věra Ferbasová and Jindřich Plachta. It is based on the novel of the same title by Erich Kästner.

The film's sets were designed by the art director Štěpán Kopecký.

== Cast ==
- Hugo Haas as Továrník Eduard Bárta
- Věra Ferbasová as Vera Bártová
- Jindřich Plachta as Jan Náprstek
- Zdeňka Baldová as Julie Hubácková
- Vladimír Borský as Dr. Obch. véd. Jaroslav Hájek
- Ella Nollová as Jeho matka
- František Paul as Reditel hotelu
- Theodor Pistek as Vrátný v Imperialu
- Míla Reymonová as Pani Kasperová
- Vlasta Hrubá as Paní Severová
- Jaroslav Marvan as Director of Barta's Works

== See also ==
- A Rare Bird (1935)
- Paradise for Three (1938)
- Three Men in the Snow (1955)
- Three Men in the Snow (1974)

== Bibliography ==
- Goble, Alan. The Complete Index to Literary Sources in Film. Walter de Gruyter, 1999.
