= Three Men in the Snow (1955 film) =

- Directed by: Kurt Hoffmann
- Screenplay by: Erich Kästner
- Based on: Three Men in the Snow; 1934 novel by Erich Kästner
- Produced by: Karl F. Sommer
- Starring: Paul Dahlke; Günther Lüders
- Cinematography: Richard Angst
- Music by: Sándor Szlatinay
- Production company: Ring-Film
- Distributed by: Ring-Film; Deutsche London Film
- Release date: 30 June 1955
- Running time: 93 minutes
- Country: Austria
- Language: German

Three Men in the Snow (German: Drei Männer im Schnee) is a 1955 Austrian comedy film based on the novel of the same name by Erich Kästner.

== Cast ==
- Paul Dahlke – Geheimrat Eduard Schlüter
- Günther Lüders – Johann Kesselhut
- Claus Biederstaedt – Dr. Fritz Hagedorn
- Nicole Heesters – Hildegard Schlüter
- Margarete Haagen – Frau Kunkel
- Alma Seidler – Mutter Hagedorn
- Eva Maria Meineke – Frau Thea Casparius
- Franz Muxeneder – Graswander Toni, Ski-Lehrer
- Hans Olden – Direktor Kühne
- Fritz Imhoff – Portier Polter
- Richard Eybner – Herr Heltai

== See also ==
- A Rare Bird (1935)
- Three Men in the Snow (1936)
- Paradise for Three (1938)
- Three Men in the Snow (1974)
