= Kommissar Brahm =

- Starring: Paul Klinger
- Country of origin: Germany

Kommissar Brahm is a German television series.

== See also ==
- List of German television series
