= The 35th of May; or, Conrad's Ride to the South Seas =

1932 novel by Erich Kästner

- Author: Erich Kästner
- Original title: Der 35. Mai oder Konrad reitet in die Südsee
- Illustrator: Walter Trier (since 1968 also Horst Lemke).
- Language: German
- Genre: Children's novel
- Publisher: New English Library
- Publication date: 1932
- Publication place: Germany
- Media type: Print (Hardback & Paperback)
- Pages: 192 pp.
- ISBN: 978-0-224-60363-8
- OCLC: 123753039

The 35th of May; or, Conrad's Ride to the South Seas (German: Der 35. Mai oder Konrad reitet in die Südsee) is a novel by Erich Kästner, first published in 1932. Unlike most of Kästner's other works - set in a completely realistic contemporary Germany - the present book is a work of fantasy and satire.

In his preface to the 1929 Emil and the Detectives the narrator recounts that he intended to write a humorous South Sea adventure story, but got stuck with the concrete details and finally followed the advice of a head waiter in his favorite cafe shop to write instead a book set in the familiar Berlin reality. Several of the characters briefly mentioned where Kästner describes his aborted fantasy were taken up in "35th of May", written three years later.

== Plot introduction ==
The novel is about Conrad, a young boy, who spends each Thursday afternoon with his uncle, Mr. Ringelhuth. One Thursday — it happens to be the 35th of May — they meet Negro Caballo, a black horse that can speak, is well-versed in German literature, and at the same time, is the best roller skater in the world. Together they enter Mr. Ringelhuth's huge wardrobe, which stands in the hallway, and end up in a series of magical lands, starting with the land of Cockaigne ("free entry — children half price"), followed by a medieval castle complete with jousting, an upside-down world in which children send bad parents to reform school, a science fiction nightmare city with mobile phones and moving walkways, and a South Sea island. On his return to the real world, Conrad writes a school essay about his experiences.

Erich Kästner's choice of a wardrobe as an entrance to the magical world refers to E.T.A. Hoffmann's The Nutcracker and the Mouse King (1816). The plot device of a magic wardrobe through which the characters enter magical lands is also used by C. S. Lewis in The Lion, the Witch and the Wardrobe, and, earlier, in the 1912 short story by E. Nesbit, "The Aunt and Amabel" — in which a girl enters a magic world through a wardrobe.
