= The Flying Classroom (1954 film) =

1954 film

- Directed by: Kurt Hoffmann
- Based on: The Flying Classroom by Erich Kästner
- Produced by: Günther Stapenhorst
- Starring: Paul Dahlke; Heliane Bei; Paul Klinger
- Cinematography: Friedl Behn-Grund
- Edited by: Fritz Stapenhorst
- Music by: Hans-Martin Majewski
- Production company: Carlton-Film
- Distributed by: Neue Filmverleih
- Release date: 3 September 1954
- Running time: 92 minutes
- Country: West Germany
- Language: German

The Flying Classroom (German: Das fliegende Klassenzimmer) is a 1954 West German family comedy film directed by Kurt Hoffmann and starring Paul Dahlke, Heliane Bei and Paul Klinger. It is an adaptation of the 1933 novel The Flying Classroom by Erich Kästner. It was a great success in Germany.

It was made at the Bavaria Studios in Munich. The film's sets were designed by the art directors Kurt Herlth and Robert Herlth. It was shot on location in Bavaria and Tyrol.

== Cast ==
- Paul Dahlke as Justus
- Heliane Bei as Schwester Beate
- Paul Klinger as Der Nichtraucher
- Erich Ponto as Der Sanitätsrat
- Bruno Hübner as Prof. Kreuzkamm
- Herbert Kroll as Direktor Grünkern
- Rudolf Vogel as Friseur Krüger
- Willy Reichert as Martins Vater
- Ruth Hausmeister as Martins Mutter
- Arno Ebert as Johnnys Vater
- Peter Vogel as Der schöne Theodor
- Peter Tost as Martin
- Peter Kraus as Johnny
- Bert Brandt as Matz
- Knut Mahlke as Uli
- Axel Arens as Sebastian
- Michael Verhoeven as Ferdinand
- Bernhard von der Planitz as Egerland
- Michael von Welser as Kreuzkamm jr.

== Bibliography ==
- Hans-Michael Bock and Tim Bergfelder. The Concise Cinegraph: An Encyclopedia of German Cinema. Berghahn Books, 2009.
