= Annaluise and Anton =

1953 film by Thomas Engel

- Directed by: Thomas Engel
- Written by: Erich Kästner (novel); Maria von der Osten-Sacken; Thomas Engel
- Based on: Pünktchen und Anton by Erich Kästner
- Produced by: Günther Stapenhorst
- Starring: Paul Klinger; Hertha Feiler; Heidemarie Hatheyer
- Cinematography: Franz Weihmayr
- Edited by: Anna Höllering
- Music by: Herbert Trantow
- Production companies: Rhombus Film; Ring-Film
- Distributed by: Herzog Filmverleih
- Release date: 27 August 1953
- Running time: 91 minutes
- Countries: Austria; West Germany
- Language: German

Annaluise and Anton (German: Pünktchen und Anton) is a 1953 Austrian-West German comedy film directed by Thomas Engel and starring Paul Klinger, Hertha Feiler, and Heidemarie Hatheyer. It was one of the 10 most popular films released in Austria that year. It was made at the Sievering Studios in Vienna. The film's sets were designed by the art director Fritz Jüptner-Jonstorff. It was remade in 1999.

== Main cast ==
- Sabine Eggerth as Pünktchen
- Peter Feldt as Anton
- Paul Klinger as Herr Pogge
- Hertha Feiler as Frau Eva Pogge
- Heidemarie Hatheyer as Frau Gast, Anton's mother
- Annie Rosar as Bertha, cook
- Jane Tilden as Fräulein Andacht
- Michael Janisch as Hollack, Chauffeur
- Carl Möhner as Höllriegel, Rennfahrer
- Claus Kaap as Klepperbein
- Hugo Gottschlich as Gustav
- Walter Varndal as Friseur Habekuss
- Herbert Kroll as Lehrer Bremser
- Maria Eis as Frau Übelmann
- Carl de Groof
- Hermann Erhardt as Ein Betrunkener
- Curt Eilers as Polizei-Wachtmeister
- Hans Putz as Robert
- Fritz von Friedl as Ein Schüler
