= Fontanes =

Fontanes or Fontanès is the name or part of the name of several communes in France:

- Fontanes, Lot, in the Lot department
- Fontanes, Lozère, in the Lozère department
- Fontanès, Gard, in the Gard department
- Fontanès, Hérault, in the Hérault department
- Fontanès, Loire, in the Loire department
- Fontanès-de-Sault, in the Aude department
- Fontanes-du-Causse, in the Lot department
