= Naussac, Lozère =

Naussac
- Part of Naussac-Fontanes
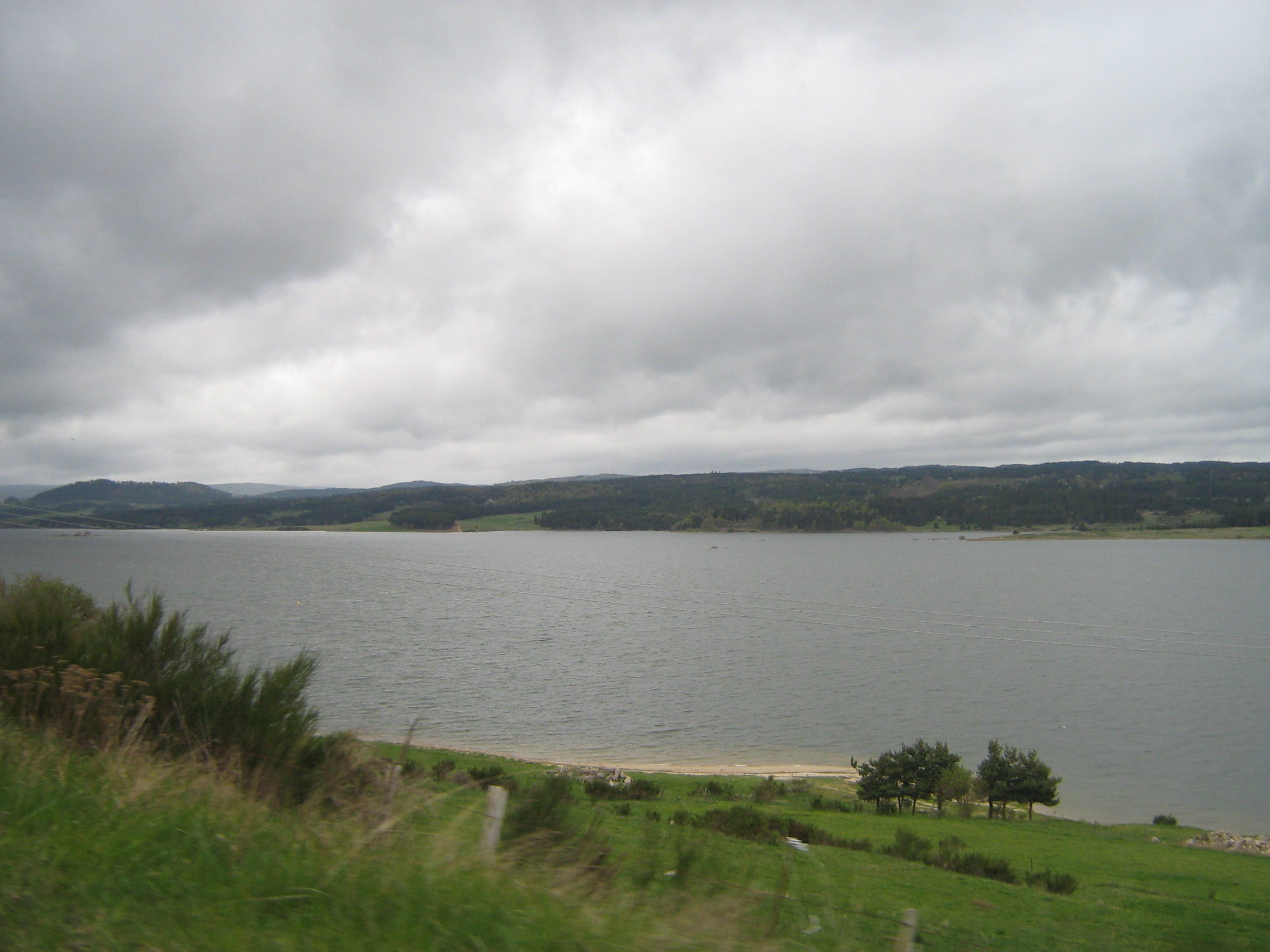
- The Lac de Naussac, an artificial lake
- Location of Naussac
- Location within France Location within Occitanie
- Coordinates: 44°43′41″N 3°50′22″E
- Country: France
- Region: Occitania
- Department: Lozère
- Arrondissement: Mende
- Canton: Langogne
- Commune: Naussac-Fontanes
- Area^{1}: 13.52 km^{2} (5.22 sq mi)
- Elevation: 925 m (3,035 ft)
- Highest elevation: 1,064 m (3,491 ft)
- Lowest elevation: 869 m (2,851 ft)
- Population (2022): 206
  - Density: 15.2/km^{2} (39.5/sq mi)
- Time zone: UTC+01:00 (CET)
  - Summer (DST): UTC+02:00 (CEST)
- Postal code: 48300
- ^{1} French Land Register data, which excludes lakes, ponds, glaciers > 1 km^{2} (0.386 sq mi or 247 acres) and river estuaries.

Naussac (French pronunciation: [nosak]; Occitan: Naussac, Nauçac, or Nonçac) is a former commune in the Lozère departement in southern France. On 1 January 2016, it was merged into the new commune of Naussac-Fontanes.

== See also ==
- Communes of the Lozère department
