= The Flying Classroom =

Novel for children by Erich Kästner

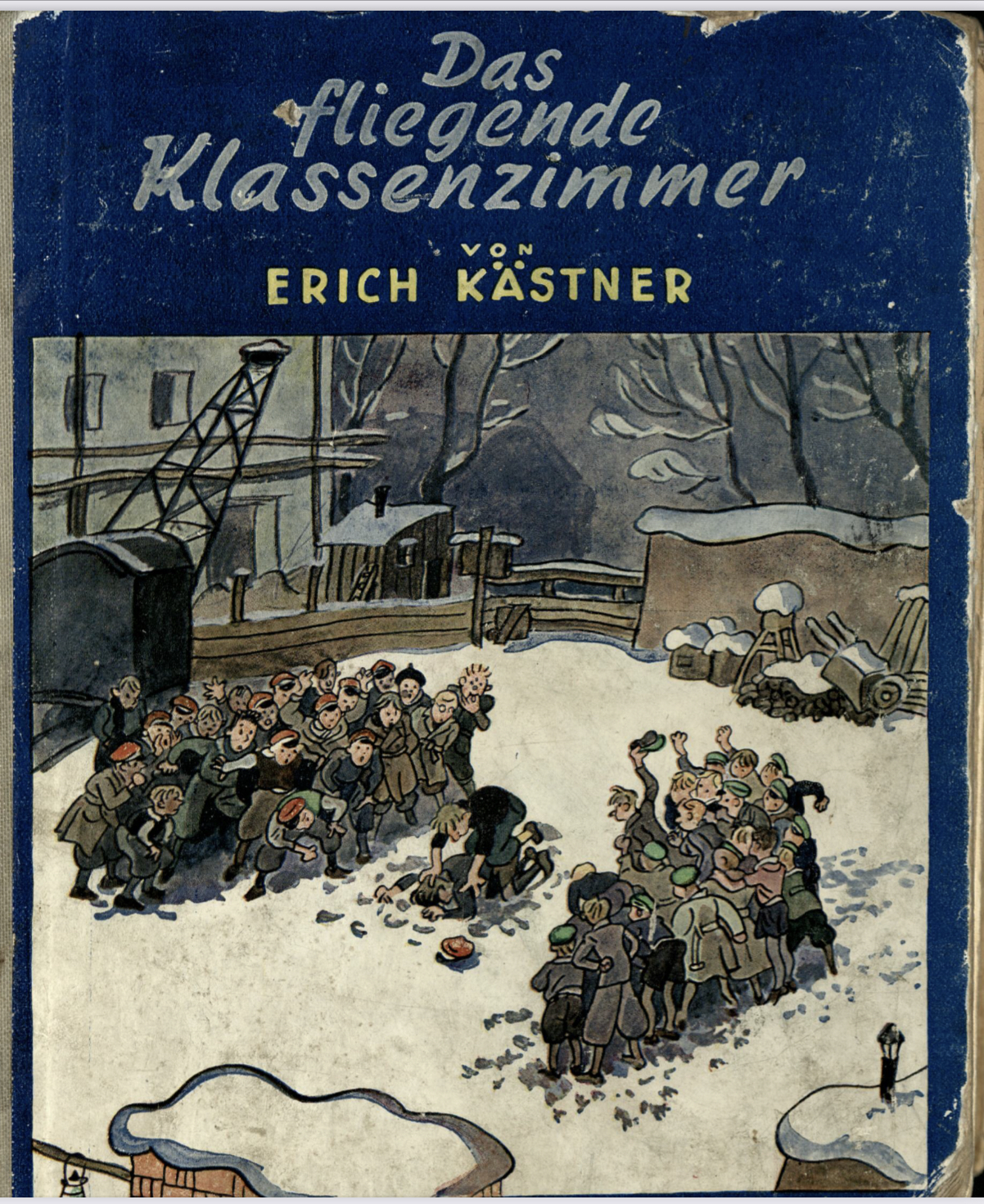
- Author: Erich Kästner
- Publication date: 1933
- Pages: 155

The Flying Classroom (German: Das fliegende Klassenzimmer) is a 1933 novel for children written by the German writer Erich Kästner.

In the book Kästner took up the predominantly British genre of the school story, taking place in a boarding school, and transferred it to an unmistakably German background.

== Plot summary ==
The story covers the last few days of term before Christmas for the students of the Johann-Sigismund Gymnasium. The main characters are Martin, the first student of the class, Jonathan, an orphan who was adopted by a captain, Matz, Uli and Sebastian, students from the Tertia (Year 8). There is a bitter struggle between the students at the Gymnasium and another school, the Realschule (which is, with some probability, not the Realschule as known today, but an Oberrealschule, as the science -oriented, rather than humanist and focussing on classical philology, variety of the Gymnasium was then called). The so-called "Realists" steal the Gymnasium's pupils' schoolbooks containing their dictations, which the teacher's son (another classmate) was to carry home to his father. The son was also captured by the 'Realschüler'. This results in a brawl between two champions of each side - Matz and one Wawerka - and a hard-fought snow-ball fight, both of which the six friends win, although they end up being reported by a student from the Prima (Year 13) for being late back to school. As a "punishment" they are docked one afternoon's leave, which they are invited to spend with their amiable house teacher Dr Johann ("Justus") Bökh at his office (coffee and cake included) where he tells them a story about his own youth and his struggle with unreasonable prefects from the Prima.

Other parts of the plot include: the friends playing a drama called the Flying Classroom written by Johnny, their friendship with the "Nonsmoker" (a former doctor who lives in a scrapped non-smoker railway compartment and works as a pub piano player) and the Nonsmoker's own friendship with Dr Bökh, with whom the boys help to re-unite him. Uli, the smallest boy, decides at this time to attempt something which will remove his reputation as a coward. His best friend, Matz, has in the past encouraged him to try to shed it, but he is horrified when he sees Uli about to jump off a tall climbing frame using an umbrella as a parachute. Uli crashes to the ground and falls unconscious. As the boys know that the Nonsmoker used to be a doctor, they fetch him, and he allays their fears that Uli is dead. However, he has a broken leg (in the Canadian version, Uli breaks an arm instead). Upon this, the Nonsmoker re-enters the medical profession as he becomes the new school doctor.

== Characters ==
- Jonathan Trotz, or Johnny - a half-American boy cast away by his parents. He loves poetry and writing, and dreams of being a great writer one day. He wants to marry a kind-hearted woman and have children - children that he won't cast away.
- Martin Thaler, or Das Dreimarkstück (Note: In 1873, the mark had replaced the Thaler at an exchange rate of 1 Taler = 3 Mark; existing talers were used as three-mark coins, hence the nickname.) - a poor (in terms of family means) but bright student. His parents cannot afford to have him travel home this Christmas and it troubles him very much. Martin has a very strong sense of justice and will come out fighting with his friends although it means risking his scholarship.
- Matthias Selbmann, or Matz - not very clever, but strong. He constantly craves for food and wants to be a professional boxer. The other children rely on him to smash their opponents. Matz is somewhat overprotective towards his best friend, Uli.
- Uli von Simmern - the blond, small, underrated rich boy, best friend of Matz. He always tries to do his best during fighting - but usually ends up hiding in fear. Uli decides to perform an act of bravado to make the others stop poking fun at him.
- Sebastian Frank - the cynical one of the five. He spends his time reading 'smart books', such as ones dealing with genetics or (Schopenhauerian) philosophy. Although he hangs out a lot with Jonathan and the other guys, he actually has no real friends and is a lonely figure, putting up a cold mask to cover his own weaknesses.
- Theodor Laban - called Der Schöne Theodor (Handsome Theo). He is Martin's prefect, busy trying to make himself look good in the eyes of the teachers.
- Dr Johann Bökh, nicknamed Justus - the children's favourite teacher. He was a student of the Johann-Sigismund School and knows well how hard life in the school can be. That's why he returned to the school - to ensure that children don't have to suffer, like he did.
- Dr. Robert Uthofft, nicknamed Nonsmoker - an old friend of Justus'. He was a medical doctor. When he lost his wife and child, he disappeared, and later took up residence in a trailer situated near his old school. His nickname does not relate to his not smoking (he does, very much so) but to his living in an old railway carriage, which still bears a sign that reads "Nonsmoker".

== Background, the sequel and trivia ==
This was the last Kästner book published before the rise of the Nazis to power. Though Nazis are not explicitly mentioned anywhere in the book, the situation of economic crisis and mass unemployment which made many German voters turn to Hitler is very evident in the book's background.

Shortly after publishing Das fliegende Klassenzimmer, Kästner witnessed how the NSDAP turned to power and how his books were burned as well as those from other dissidents. Although fourteen of Kästner's other books were banned, Das fliegende Klassenzimmer was widely sold in bookstores, as Kästner recorded in a letter to his mother in December 1933.

A short sequel, in which the characters visit the Winter Olympics of 1936 (held at Garmisch-Partenkirchen in Bavaria) was already written under the Nazi regime and was published only many years later, having less success than the original: Zwei Schüler sind verschwunden in Das Schwein beim Friseur (The Pig at the Barbershop). In it, Kästner let his characters have a friendly encounter with visiting English boys, culminating in winning their British Gold Medal, at a time when their soon meeting each other as enemy soldiers on the battlefield was already a very real possibility.

== Publication history ==
- Kästner, Erich (1933). Das Fliegende Klassenzimmer. Germany.
- Kästner, Erich; Walter Trier (Illustrator) (October 1967). The Flying Classroom. Translated by Cyrus Brooks (English ed.). Puffin Books. ISBN 0-14-030311-1.

== Film, TV or theatrical adaptations ==
- The Flying Classroom - film (West Germany, 1954), directed by Kurt Hoffmann, with Paul Dahlke (Justus), Paul Klinger (Nichtraucher), Bruno Hübner (Prof. Kreuzkamm).
- The Flying Classroom - film (West Germany 1973), directed by Werner Jacobs, with Joachim Fuchsberger (Justus), Heinz Reincke (Nichtraucher).
- The Flying Classroom - film (Germany, 2003), directed by Tomy Wigand, with Hauke Diekamp (Jonathan Trotz), Frederick Lau (Matthias Selbmann), François Goeske (Sebastian Kreuzkamm), Hans-Broich Wuttke (Uli von Simmern), Philipp Peters-Arnolds (Martin Thaler), Nicky Kantor (Der Schöne Theo), Sebastian Koch (Nichtraucher), Piet Klocke (Professor Kreuzkamm, the principal, Sebastian's father), Ulrich Noethen (Justus). In Wigand's film, the story and characters were altered to suit the present time. Sebastian Frank is fused with Rudi Kreuzkamm to produce 'Sebastian Kreuzkamm', a red-haired nerd, and the plot is liberally reinterpreted to include subjects such as girls or divorce.

== See also ==
- The Paul Street Boys
- War of the Buttons
