= Naussac-Fontanes =

- Commune
- Location of Naussac-Fontanes
- Location within France Location within Occitanie
- Coordinates: 44°46′08″N 3°49′48″E
- Country: France
- Region: Occitania
- Department: Lozère
- Arrondissement: Mende
- Canton: Langogne

Government
  - Mayor (2020–2026): Jean-Louis Brun
- Area^{1}: 24.80 km^{2} (9.58 sq mi)
- Population (2023): 372
  - Density: 15.0/km^{2} (38.8/sq mi)
- Time zone: UTC+01:00 (CET)
  - Summer (DST): UTC+02:00 (CEST)
- INSEE/Postal code: 48105 /48300
- ^{1} French Land Register data, which excludes lakes, ponds, glaciers > 1 km^{2} (0.386 sq mi or 247 acres) and river estuaries.

Naussac-Fontanes (French pronunciation: [nosak fɔ̃tan]; Occitan: Fontanas) is a commune in the department of Lozère, southern France. The municipality was established on 1 January 2016 by merger of the former communes of Naussac and Fontanes.

== See also ==
- Communes of the Lozère department
