= Fontanes, Lozère =

Fontanes
- Part of Naussac-Fontanes
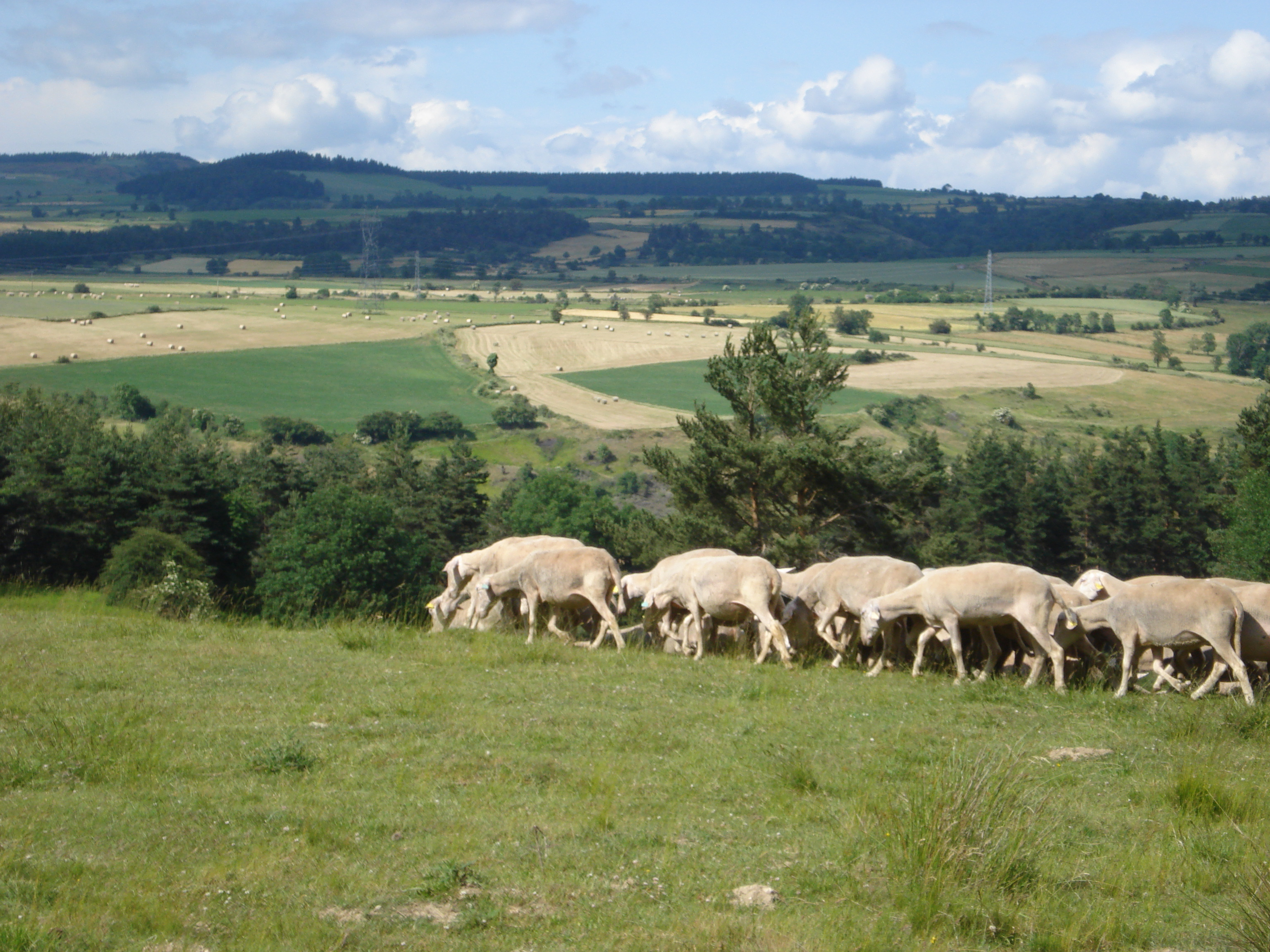
- Sheep on the high plateau, in Fontanes

- Coat of arms
- Location of Fontanes
- Location within France Location within Occitanie
- Coordinates: 44°46′15″N 3°47′10″E
- Country: France
- Region: Occitania
- Department: Lozère
- Arrondissement: Mende
- Canton: Langogne
- Commune: Naussac-Fontanes
- Area^{1}: 11.28 km^{2} (4.36 sq mi)
- Elevation: 1,000 m (3,300 ft)
- Highest elevation: 1,075 m (3,527 ft)
- Lowest elevation: 791 m (2,595 ft)
- Population (2022): 162
  - Density: 14.4/km^{2} (37.2/sq mi)
- Time zone: UTC+01:00 (CET)
  - Summer (DST): UTC+02:00 (CEST)
- Postal code: 48300
- ^{1} French Land Register data, which excludes lakes, ponds, glaciers > 1 km^{2} (0.386 sq mi or 247 acres) and river estuaries.

Fontanes (French pronunciation: [fɔ̃tan]; Occitan: Fontanas) is a former commune in the Lozère department in southern France. On 1 January 2016, it was merged into the new commune of Naussac-Fontanes. Its population was 162 in 2022.

== See also ==
- Communes of the Lozère department
