= Fontanet =

Fontanet is a surname. Notable people with the surname include:

- José Fontanet (1900–1941), Spanish water polo player
- Joseph Fontanet (1921–1980), French politician
- Patricio Fontanet (born 1979), Argentine singer-songwriter
- Pedro Mata y Fontanet (1811–1877), Spanish medical doctor
- Xavier Fontanet (born 1948), French businessman.

== See also ==
- Fontanet, Indiana, an unincorporated census-designated place in Vigo County, Indiana
- Fontenet, a commune in the Charente-Maritime department in southwestern France
