= Lac de Naussac =

Lake in Lozère, Occitania, France

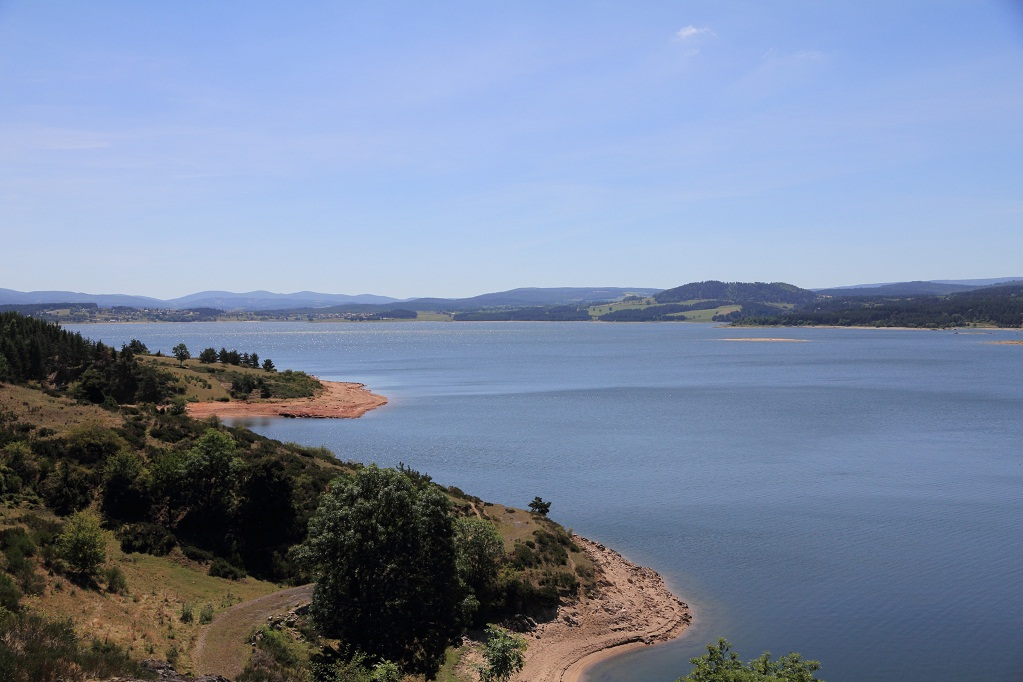

- Location within France
- Location: Lozère
- Coordinates: 44°44′49″N 3°47′55″E
- Type: artificial
- Primary inflows: Allier, Chapeauroux
- Primary outflows: Allier
- Basin countries: France
- Max. length: 8 km (5.0 mi)
- Max. width: 2.7 km (1.7 mi)
- Surface area: 10.8 km^{2} (4.2 sq mi)
- Max. depth: 50 m (160 ft)
- Water volume: 190,000,000 m^{3} (6.7×10^{9} cu ft)
- Surface elevation: 945 m (3,100 ft)
- Islands: 1

Lac de Naussac is a lake in Lozère, France. At an elevation of 945 m, its surface area is 10.8 km².
