= Regina Ziegler =

German film producer (1944–2026)

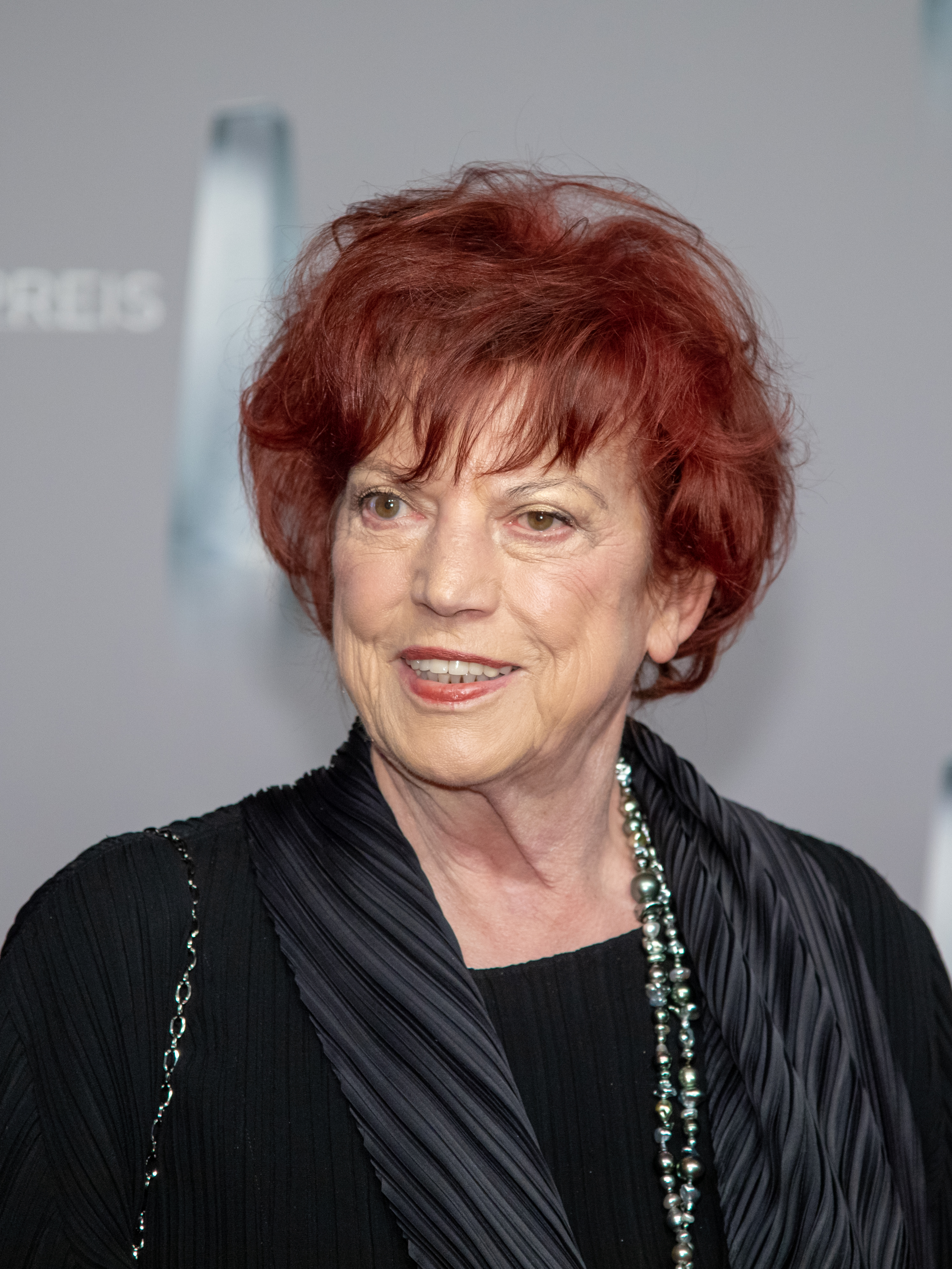
- Ziegler in 2019
- Born: 8 March 1944; Quedlinburg, Gau Magdeburg-Anhalt, Germany
- Died: 1 November 2026 (aged 82); Berlin, Germany
- Occupation: Producer

Regina Ziegler (8 March 1944 – 1 November 2026) was a German film and television producer.

== Life and career ==
Born in Quedlinburg, the daughter of a journalist, Ziegler briefly studied law at the Free University of Berlin, before dropping her studies to work at the Sender Freies Berlin as a production assistant. Germany's first female film producer, she started her own independent company Ziegler Films in 1973. She produced about 500 works between cinema and television, including the Golden Lion winner film A Year of the Quiet Sun by Krzysztof Zanussi, as well as works by Volker Schlöndorff, Andrzej Wajda, Ulrich Schamoni and her life-partner Wolf Gremm.

During her career Ziegler received various awards and honours, including a Romy Award for her career, a Lifetime Carl Laemmle Produzentenpreis, and the Federal Cross of Merit 1st Class. She served as a juror at the 44th Venice International Film Festival. In 2006, her career was the subject of a retrospective at the Museum of Modern Art in New York.

Ziegler died on 1 November 2026, at the age of 82.
