= Gaby Hauptmann =

German writer and journalist (born 1957)

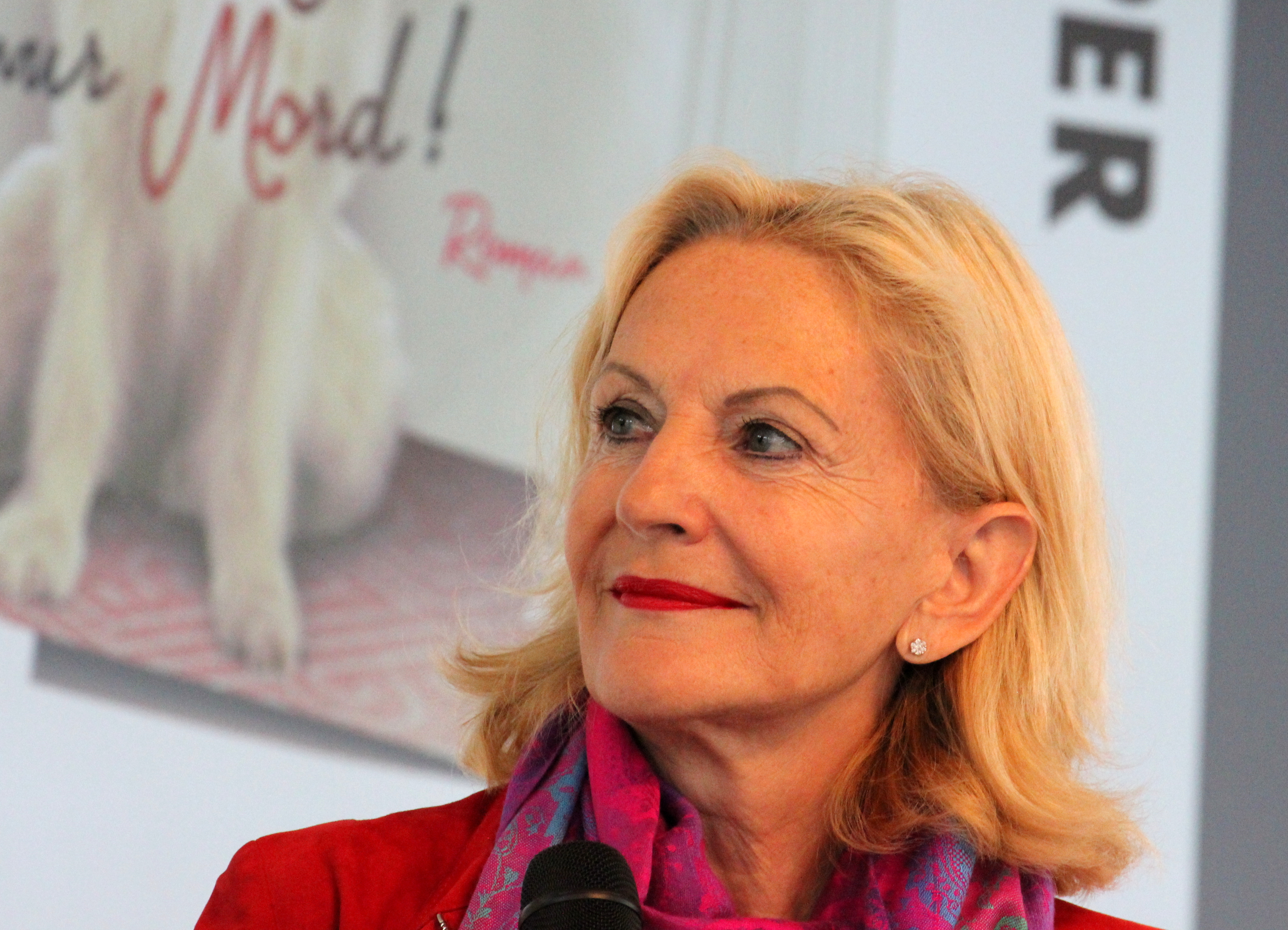
- Hauptmann in 2017
- Born: 14 May 1957 (age 69); Villingen-Schwenningen, West Germany
- Occupations: Writer; Journalist
- Known for: Her novels

Gaby Hauptmann (born 14 May 1957) is a German journalist and writer.

== Life ==
Hauptmann was born in Villingen-Schwenningen in 1957. Her grandfather was the noted Black Forest based painter Karl Hauptmann. She started her writing career at the Südkurier newspaper. She left after two years and formed her own business running a press office. She then became chief editor at the radio station Radio Seefunk RSF from 1987.

She began working for the broadcaster Südwestfunk initially as a writer but in time a director and producer.

Her first book was for children, but her first bestseller was "Suche impotenten Mann fürs Leben" which was made into the film In Search of an Impotent Man. Her books have sold six million copies in total.

She has written novels in German, and filmscripts and has worked as a TV producer. Her books include "A Handful of Manhood" which has been translated into English.

In 2005 she started to write a series of books for younger readers with horse related themes.
