= Three Men in the Snow (novel) =

1934 novel by Erich Kästner

- Author: Erich Kästner
- Original title: Drei Männer im Schnee
- Language: German
- Publisher: Rascher Verlag
- Publication date: 1934
- Publication place: Switzerland
- Pages: 277

Three Men in the Snow (German: Drei Männer im Schnee) is a 1934 novel by the German writer Erich Kästner.

== Plot ==
The novel is about an eccentric millionaire who disguises himself as a poor man and wins a stay at a fancy hotel in the Alps, while an actually poor man also wins a stay at the hotel and is mistaken as wealthy. The story was an expansion from Kästner's 1927 short story "Inferno im Hotel".

== Publication ==
Three Men in the Snow was published in Switzerland in 1934 and initially had unclear legal status in Germany. The Ministry of Propaganda had banned the sale of Kästner's books in Germany in the autumn of 1934, but this was not applied consistently and Three Men in the Snow was available in Berlin. It was withdrawn from circulation in the autumn of 1935, when a more consistent blanket ban was applied to Kästner's books.

== Adaptations ==
The novel is the basis for multiple films, including the French A Rare Bird (1935), the Czechoslovak Three Men in the Snow (1936), the Swedish Poor Millionaires (1936), the American Paradise for Three (1938), the Austrian Three Men in the Snow (1955) and the West German Three Men in the Snow (1974).
