= Ernst Hannawald =

German actor (born 1959)

Ernst Hannawald (born 20 October 1959 in Heidholzen, Germany) is a German television actor, best known for his role in The Consequence.

== Life ==
Ernst Hannawald was discovered at the age of 17 by Wolfgang Petersen for his film Die Konsequenz. The homosexual romantic drama caused a scandal in 1977 because the Bayerischer Rundfunk switched off the broadcast during the programme. Hannawald continued to act mainly in socially critical films. After his second leading role in Die Faust in der Tasche, he was given a smaller role in the film Traffic Jam under the direction of Luigi Comencini.

Hannawald became known nationwide through the series Zeit genug with Toni Berger. He also appeared in the series Irgendwie und Sowieso and Zur Freiheit by Franz Xaver Bogner.

In 1986, Hannawald caused a car accident on Munich's Leopoldstraße in which his then fiancée Lucie and two friends were killed. He himself was seriously injured in the accident and was in a coma. A court later placed partial blame on him, as he had changed direction over a solid line, while the other party in the accident, who had ignored a red traffic light at excessive speed while drunk and thus crashed into his car, was primarily to blame.

To finance his drug addiction, which Hannawald believes was a consequence of the car accident, he robbed a bank and a post office in 1998. He was sentenced to five years in prison and was granted an early release in August 2000 for good behaviour. During his time in prison, he wrote his autobiographical book Life is not a film. In the early 2000s he resumed his acting career.

== Filmography ==
=== Feature films ===
- 1977 - Die Konsequenz (The Consequence)
- 1978 - Fist in the Pocket (Die Faust in der Tasche)
- 1979 - Traffic Jam (L'ingorgo - Una storia impossibile)
- 1979 - The Last Years of Childhood (Die letzten Jahre der Kindheit)
- 2007 - Das sardonische Lächeln
- 2013 - Dampfnudelblues

=== Television ===
- 1981: Zeit genug
- 1986: Zur Freiheit
- 1986: Irgendwie und Sowieso
- 1997: Mali
- 2002: Schlauer als die Polizei erlaubt
- Guest star roles in Löwengrube, Café Meineid, München 7, Tatort, Derrick, The Old Fox, SOKO 5113 and Die Rosenheim-Cops
