= Rob Houwer =

Dutch film producer (1937–2025)

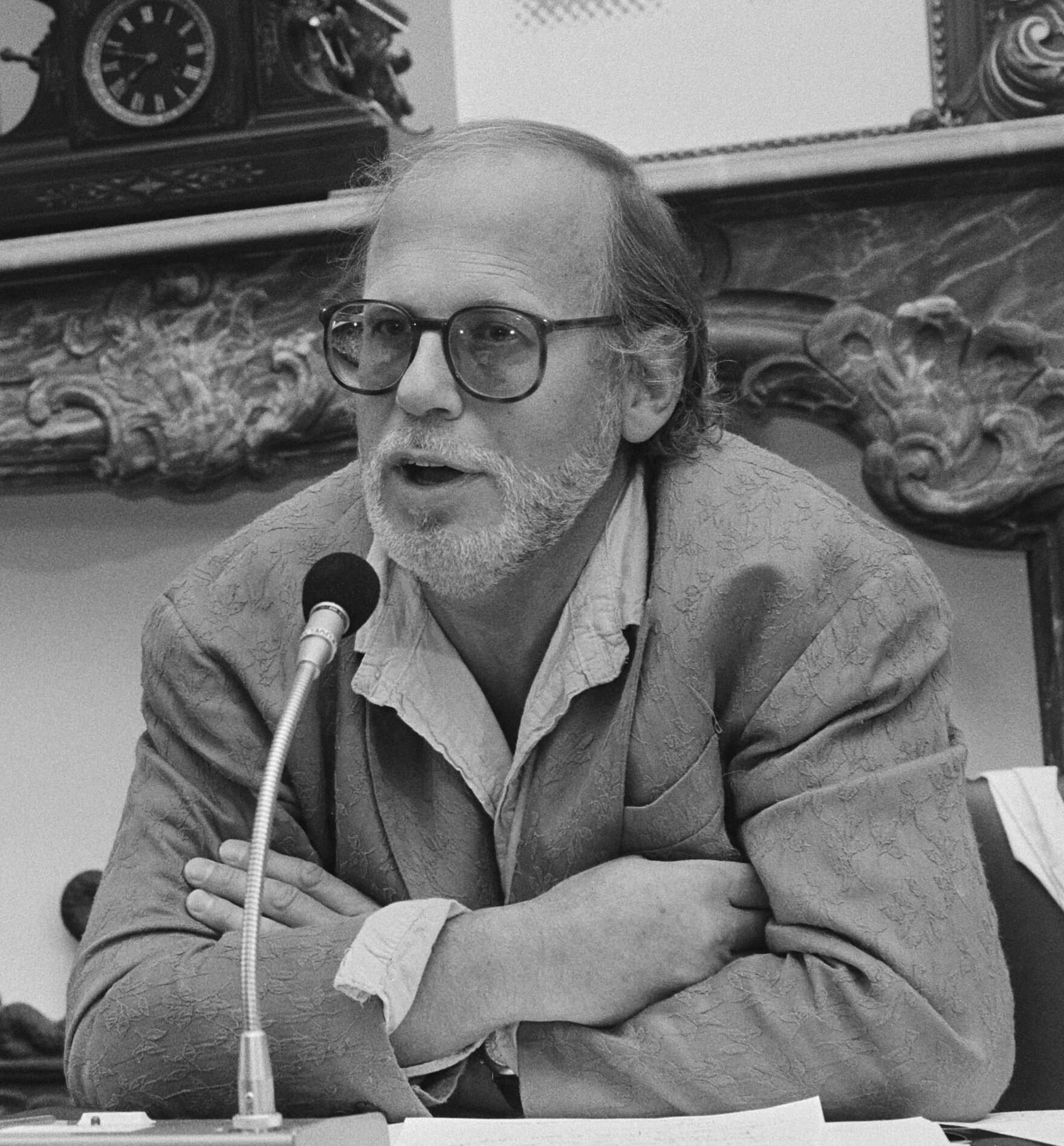
- Born: Robert Piet Houwer; 13 December 1937; Hoogeveen, Netherlands
- Died: 4 July 2025 (aged 87); Amsterdam, Netherlands
- Occupation: Film producer
- Years active: 1960–2012
- Children: 7

Robert Piet Houwer (13 December 1937 – 4 July 2025) was a Dutch film producer. He studied at the University of Television and Film Munich, Germany. In 1964 he directed the short film Anmeldung (Declaration) which was awarded a Silver Bear at the Berlin Filmfest. During the 1960s, Rob Houwer became one of the most prolific producers in Germany, with directors Volker Schlöndorff (A Degree of Murder, Man on Horseback), Peter Fleischmann (Hunting Scenes from Bavaria), Johannes Schaaf (Tattoo), Michael Verhoeven (Up the Establishment, o.k.) and Hans-Jürgen Syberberg (Romy: Anatomy of a Face).

== Life and career ==
In February 1962, he was one of the ten co-founders of the Oberhausen Manifesto, a pivotal declaration that laid the foundation for the ‘new German film’. In 1967, Houwer gained international recognition with his production of Schlöndorff’s A Degree of Murder, which earned a nomination for the Golden Palm at the Cannes Film Festival that year. The original soundtrack by Brian Jones of The Rolling Stones, featuring contributions from Led Zeppelin founder Jimmy Page, added to the film’s allure. Notably, Jones’ then-girlfriend, the German-Italian actress Anita Pallenberg, made her debut in the lead role. Distributed globally by Universal Pictures, it marked the first post-war German film to secure distribution by an American major studio. That same year, Houwer’s production Tattoo was selected as the official German entry for the 40th edition of the Oscars.

In Germany, at the end of the 1960s, he produced several documentaries about prominent figures in the film industry, including Romy Schneider (Romy: Anatomy of a Face), Billy Wilder (Billy Wilder: Report on a Hollywood Director), and Alfred Hitchcock (What Did You Do with Jefferson, Alfred?), shot in Universal City, California. Upon his return to the Netherlands in 1971, he frequently collaborated with Paul Verhoeven and produced most of his Dutch films. Turkish Delight (1973), based on the novel by Jan Wolkers, became the most frequently visited film in Dutch cinema and still holds that place today. In 1973, Turkish Delight was nominated for the Oscar for Best Foreign Language Film at the 46th Academy Awards. Soldier of Orange received the Los Angeles Film Critics Association Award for Best Foreign Film in 1979 and was nominated for a Golden Globe for Best Foreign Language Film.

The relationship between Houwer and Verhoeven ended when Verhoeven moved to the US in 1985. Houwer's later films did not always enjoy the huge commercial success of his early productions. Some of his later productions were considered to be among the worst in Dutch cinema by critics: De gulle Minnaar (1990), De Zeemeerman (1996) and Het woeden der gehele wereld (2006). Grijpstra & De Gier and The Dragon That Wasn't (Or Was He?), like the feature films directed by Verhoeven, reached an audience of millions. The Dragon That Wasn't (Or Was He?), supervised by Houwer and artist Marten Toonder became the All-Time Number One Dutch animated feature at the box office. Houwer was awarded the Golden Calf for Best Film in 1993 for The Little Blonde Death. In 1999, he received a second Golden Calf, this time for Turkish Delight, as the ‘Film of the Century’. H.M. The Queen appointed him as Officer in the Order of Orange-Nassau, a distinguished Dutch royal decoration. On 4 November 2022, Rob Houwer officially received the UNESCO flag, marking the film Soldier of Orange as cultural heritage included in the Dutch Memory of the World program by UNESCO.

Houwer died in Amsterdam on 4 July 2025, at the age of 87.

== Awards and nominations ==
Academy Awards

Year	Nominated work	Category	Result
1973	Turkish Delight	Best Foreign Language Film	Nominated

Golden Globe Awards

Year	Nominated work	Category	Result
1977	Soldier of Orange	Best Foreign Language Film	Nominated

== Selected filmography ==
West Germany

- Romy: Anatomy of a Face (dir. Hans-Jürgen Syberberg, 1967)
- A Degree of Murder (dir. Volker Schlöndorff, 1967)
- Tattoo (dir. Johannes Schaaf, 1967)
- Engelchen (dir. Marran Gosov, 1968)
- Lebeck (dir. Johannes Schaaf, 1968)
- Sugar Bread and Whip (1968)
- Angel Baby (1968)
- 24 Hour Lover (1968)
- Hunting Scenes from Bavaria (dir. Peter Fleischmann, 1969)
- Up the Establishment (dir. Michael Verhoeven, 1969)
- Man on Horseback (dir. Volker Schlöndorff, 1969)
- Student of the Bedroom (dir. Michael Verhoeven, 1970)
- o.k. (dir. Michael Verhoeven, 1970)
- Majestät brauchen Sonne (dir. Peter Schamoni, 1999)

Netherlands

- Business Is Business (dir. Paul Verhoeven, 1971)
- Turkish Delight (dir. Paul Verhoeven, 1973)
- Keetje Tippel (dir. Paul Verhoeven, 1975)
- Soldier of Orange (dir. Paul Verhoeven, 1977)
- Grijpstra & De Gier (dir. Wim Verstappen, 1979)
- The Dragon That Wasn't (Or Was He?) (animated film, 1983)
- The Fourth Man (dir. Paul Verhoeven, 1983)
- Brandende liefde (dir. Ate de Jong, 1983)
- Count Your Blessings (dir. Pieter Verhoeff, 1987)
- De Gulle Minnaar (dir. Mady Saks, 1990)
- The Little Blonde Death (dir. Jean van de Velde, 1993)
- De Zeemeerman (dir. Frank Herrebout, 1996)
- Bigger than James Dean (dir. Frank Krom, 2004)
- Het Woeden der Gehele Wereld (dir. Guido Pieters, 2006)
