= Dream City (film) =

1973 West German film directed by Johannes Schaaf

- Directed by: Johannes Schaaf
- Screenplay by: Johannes Schaaf; Rosemarie Fendel
- Based on: The Other Side by Alfred Kubin
- Produced by: Heinz Angermeyer
- Starring: Per Oscarsson; Rosemarie Fendel
- Cinematography: Klaus König; Gérard Vandenberg
- Edited by: Russell Parker
- Music by: Eberhard Schoener
- Production company: Independent Film Heinz Angermeyer
- Distributed by: Constantin Film
- Release date: 15 November 1973
- Running time: 124 minutes
- Country: West Germany
- Language: German
- Budget: 2 million DM

Dream City (German: Traumstadt) is a 1973 West German drama film directed by Johannes Schaaf and starring Per Oscarsson and Rosemarie Fendel.

== Plot ==
An artist couple from Munich move to a supposed utopian state that has been set up in Asia.

== Cast ==
- Per Oscarsson as Florian Sand
- Rosemarie Fendel as Anna Sand
- Olimpia as The Girl
- Eva Maria Meineke as Mrs. Lampenbogen
- Helen Vita as Princess
- Heinrich Schweiger as Mr. Gautsch
- Ron Williams as Hercules Bell
- Alexander May as Dr. Lampenbogen
- Louis Waldon as Louis
- Josef Hlinomaz as Magistrate
- Herbert Bötticher as Sir Edward
- Emil Iserle as Prof. Korntheur
- Suacina Krytenés as Ludwig the Dwarf

== Production ==
The film is loosely based on the 1909 novel The Other Side by Alfred Kubin, transposed from the Mitteleuropa of its day to 1970s West Germany. The production budget was two million Deutsche Mark. Filming took six months and took place in Czechoslovakia, especially Krumlov, and Israel.

== Reception ==
Vincent Canby of The New York Times called the film "an interior decorator's dream, full of bizarre sets, costumes and make-up", and described it as a "nightmare that can't make up its mind whether its interests are psychological or political".
