= The Emperor's Tomb =

1938 novel by Joseph Roth

- Author: Joseph Roth
- Original title: Die Kapuzinergruft
- Translator: John Hoare
- Language: German
- Publisher: De Gemeenschap
- Publication date: 1938
- Publication place: Netherlands
- English publication date: 1984
- Pages: 231

The Emperor's Tomb (German: Die Kapuzinergruft) is a 1938 novel by the Austrian writer Joseph Roth. The Overlook Press published an English translation by John Hoare in 1984. The title refers to the Imperial Crypt in Vienna. The novel was adapted into the 1971 film Trotta directed by Johannes Schaaf. New Directions Publishing Corporation published a new translation by Michael Hofmann in 2013.

New German edition, based on the first print: Joseph Roth, Die Kapuzinergruft, ed. by Werner Bellmann, Reclam, Stuttgart 2013. [with detailed commentary and epilog]

== See also ==
- 1938 in literature
- Austrian literature
