= Romy (disambiguation) =

Romy is a given name.

Romy may also refer to:

- Kevin Romy (born 1985), Swiss ice hockey player
- Romy (TV award), Austrian TV award
- Romy: Anatomy of a Face, a documentary film about Romy Schneider
- ROMY, ICAO code for Miyako Airport
