= The Other Side (Kubin novel) =

1909 novel by Alfred Kubin

- Cover of Die andere Seite. Ein phantastischer Roman (1909)
- Author: Alfred Kubin
- Original title: Die andere Seite
- Translator: Denver Lindley
- Illustrator: Alfred Kubin
- Language: German
- Publisher: Georg Müller Verlag
- Publication date: 1909
- Publication place: Germany
- English publication date: 20 October 1967
- Pages: 339

The Other Side (German: Die andere Seite. Ein phantastischer Roman) is a 1909 novel by the Austrian writer Alfred Kubin. It is about a man who is invited to come and live in a kingdom that has been created in Central Asia from old European buildings. Kubin was known as a draughtsman and The Other Side was his only novel. It was inspired by his own illustrations originally intended for the novel The Golem by Gustav Meyrink. It is regarded as a precursor to magical realism.

== Background ==
In the early 1900s, Alfred Kubin became an established draughtsman and illustrator known for his dark, otherworldly and sexually charged imagery. After a few years, when his wife had become sickly and they had moved to the Austrian countryside, he began to struggle to continue making images. He wrote in a private letter: "I don't believe I am an artist any longer; perhaps I am a writer, perhaps a philosopher, perhaps something else—a thing or something else again, or I am nothing at all." Some time previously, he had been commissioned to create illustrations for Gustav Meyrink's novel The Golem, which had been delayed for several years. Kubin decided to write his own novel with these unused illustrations as basis, and this became The Other Side. He finished the novel quickly.

== Plot ==
The narrator and his wife are invited by his old friend Patera to come and visit the Dream Kingdom, which has been set up in Central Asia. The kingdom has been created from old buildings and objects that have been brought in from Europe and reassembled into the city Perle. It has a population of 65,000 people. In Perle, the narrator gets a job as a newspaper illustrator. He explores the kingdom and its strange inhabitants in a report-like fashion. Eventually, the kingdom begins to disintegrate and suffers a great upheaval. The novel is divided into three parts: the first is about the journey to Perle, the second about life there, and the third about its downfall.

== Major themes ==
Kubin wrote about The Other Side: "During its composition I achieved the mature realisation that it is not only in the bizarre, exalted or comic moments of our existence that the highest values lie, but that the painful, the indifferent, and the incidental-commonplace contain these same mysteries. This is the principal meaning of the book."

The novel has apocalyptic motifs that combine influences from Lebensphilosophie with contemporaneous occult and paranormal writings. Characters repeatedly describe the outside world, with its increasing mechanisation and technocracy, as hostile to life and regard the Dream Kingdom as a life-affirming refuge. The apocalyptic elements have been connected to fin de siècle themes and the disintegration of Austria-Hungary.

== Publication ==
Georg Müller Verlag in Munich published the original German edition in 1909 as Die andere Seite. Ein phantastischer Roman (lit. 'The Other Side: A Fantastical Novel'). It included Kubin's 52 illustrations of which one is a map. Several editions followed, including a revised version published in 1952. It was Kubin's only novel. It was published in Denver Lindley's English translation on 20 October 1967. A new translation by Mike Mitchell was published on 8 October 2000.

== Reception ==
The book was well received in the German-speaking world and is regarded as a precursor to magical realism. It influenced several Austrian and German writers, notably Ernst Jünger, who took interest in Kubin's conception of the interior and exterior of things, and how the invisible and visible exist in fusion. Other writers influenced by the book include Thomas Mann, Franz Kafka, Joseph Roth, Hermann Kasack and Christoph Ransmayr. The scholar Andreas Geyer calls it a "key work of literary modernism".

The novel and Kubin's autobiographical notes about its conception became recurring subjects in psychoanalytical literature. Hermann Rorschach devoted a section to it in his book Psychodiagnostics.

== Adaptations ==
The novel was the basis for the 1973 film Dream City directed by Johannes Schaaf and the 2010 opera Die andere Seite composed by Michael Obst to a libretto by Hermann Schneider.
