= Die Wilsheimer =

- Starring: Hansjörg Felmy; Gila von Weitershausen
- Country of origin: Germany

Die Wilsheimer is a German television series.

== Cast ==
- Hansjörg Felmy as Jean Ziegler
- Ulrike Stürzbecher as Anni Ziegler
- Axel Jörg as Andreas Ziegler
- Regine Lutz as Luise Ziegler
- Dieter Kirchlechner as Friedrich Erlemann
- Ulrike Bliefert as Betty Erlemann
- Tilman Madaus as Michael Erlemann
- Iris Berben as Gudrun Idstein
- Knut Hinz as Edmund Idstein
- Ben Engel as Helmut Eschesheimer
- Silvia Tietz as Marlies Knapp
- Hans Weicker as Lautengast
- Gila von Weitershausen as Lilo Ziegler

== See also ==
- List of German television series
