= Helmut Brasch =

German performer

- Born: 15 August 1912; Berlin, German Empire
- Died: 2 July 1987 (aged 74); Starnberg, Bavaria, West Germany
- Occupation: Actor
- Years active: 1936–1987

Helmut Brasch (1912–1987) was a German film, television actor and cabaret singer.

In 1945 he sang Child of the Ruins (German: Das Trümmerkind), which describes some facets of Berlin society. He played S.S. Man Scharf in Divina-Film Nachts, wenn der Teufel kam (1957), by Robert Siodmak. He played mayor along Rolf Becker and Hannes Fuchs in I Love You, I Kill You (1971).

== Selected filmography ==
- Maria, die Magd (1936) - Johann
- Heimweh (1937) - Ein Fischer
- Wie einst im Mai (1938) - Tankstellenwart
- Der letzte Appell (1939)
- The Desert Song (1939) - Sam
- The Girl from Fano (1941) - Klaus
- Fritz and Friederike (1952)
- Rose Bernd (1957)
- Weißer Holunder (1957) - Ferdinand
- The Devil Strikes at Night (1957) - SS-Truppenfuehrer Scharf
- Der Pauker (1958) - Detective
- Liebe auf krummen Beinen (1959)
- Heiße Ware (1959) - Gessner
- People in the Net (1959) - Grasdorffer
- Beloved Augustin (1960) - Steuereinnehmer
- Les honneurs de la guerre (1961) - Müller
- Snow White and the Seven Jugglers (1962) - Dompteur Toni
- A Man in His Prime (1964)
- Go for It, Baby (1968) - Viktor Block
- Der Griller (1968) - Dr. Meyer
- Office Girls (1971) - Direktor Wieland
- I Love You, I Kill You (1971) - Mayor
- The Love Keys (1971)
- Sex in the Office (1972)
- Hausfrauen-Report 3.Teil - Alle Jahre wieder-wenn aus blutjungen Mädchen blutjunge Hausfrauen werden (1972) - Vertreter von Aphrodisiaka
- Was wissen Sie von Titipu? (1972) - Trainer
- Schulmädchen-Report 5. Teil - Was Eltern wirklich wissen sollten (1973) - Opa Kessler (uncredited)
- Cipolla Colt (1975) - Judge Logan
- Berlinger (1975) - Man (uncredited)
- Hugs and Other Things (1975) - Verleger Bergmann
- Potato Fritz (1976)
- Die Affäre Lerouge (1976) - Lerouge
- Rosemary's Daughter (1976) - Dr. Schreier
- The Tin Drum (1979) - Der alte Heilandt
- Warten bis Lili kommt (1982) - Opa

== Bibliography ==
- Pitts, Michael R. Western Movies: A Guide to 5,105 Feature Films. McFarland, 2012.
