= Edith Volkmann =

German actress (1920–1997)

- Born: 14 November 1920; Hanover, Germany
- Died: 29 July 1997 (aged 76); Munich, Germany
- Occupation: Actress
- Years active: 1951–1994

Edith Volkmann (14 November 1920 – 29 July 1997) was a German film and television actress.

== Selected filmography ==
- Corinna Schmidt (1951)
- Stärker als die Nacht (1954)
- Go for It, Baby (1968)
- I Only Want You To Love Me (1976)
- Die Konsequenz (1977)

== Bibliography ==
- Sloan, Jane. Reel Women: An International Directory of Contemporary Feature Films about Women. Scarecrow Press, 2007.
