= Don't Fumble, Darling =

- Directed by: May Spils
- Written by: Werner Enke
- Produced by: Hans Fries
- Starring: Werner Enke; Gila von Weitershausen; Henry van Lyck
- Cinematography: Hubertus Hagen; Niklaus Schilling
- Edited by: Ulrike Froehner
- Music by: Kristian Schultze
- Production company: Cinenova Film
- Distributed by: Paramount Pictures
- Release date: 9 January 1970
- Running time: 87 minutes
- Country: West Germany
- Language: German

Don't Fumble, Darling (German: Nicht fummeln, Liebling) is a 1970 West German comedy film directed by May Spils and starring Werner Enke, Gila von Weitershausen and Henry van Lyck. The film was distributed by the German subsidiary of Paramount Pictures. It was a commercial success on its release, one of the biggest hits in Germany that year. The film was shot at the Bavaria Studios in Munich, and on location around the city during the summer of 1969.

== Cast ==
- Werner Enke as Charly
- Gila von Weitershausen as Gila
- Henry van Lyck as Harry
- Benno Hoffmann as Herbert Oehl
- Elke Haltaufderheide as Elke
- Jean Launay as Lux
- Otto Sander as Revoluzzer Otto
- Iris Gras as Starlet
- Sabrina A. Wengen as Starlet
- Michael Cromer as Klaus-Peter Pumm
- Johannes Buzalski as Gefängniswärter Bumski
- Ingrid Stahl as Reni Tenz
- Kasimir Esser as Kasimir
- Karl Schönböck as Actor in Geiselgasteig
- Erica Beer as Actress in Geiselgasteig

== Bibliography ==
- Bock, Hans-Michael & Bergfelder, Tim. The Concise Cinegraph: Encyclopaedia of German Cinema. Berghahn Books, 2009.
