= Trotta (film) =

- Directed by: Johannes Schaaf
- Written by: Johannes Schaaf; Maximilian Schell
- Based on: The Emperor's Tomb by Joseph Roth
- Starring: András Bálint; Rosemarie Fendel; Doris Kunstmann
- Cinematography: Wolfgang Treu
- Edited by: Dagmar Hirtz
- Production companies: Independent Film; Johannes Schaff Productions
- Distributed by: Constantin Film
- Release date: 16 November 1971
- Running time: 95 minutes
- Country: Germany
- Language: German

Trotta is a 1971 West German film directed by Johannes Schaaf. It is based on the 1938 novel Die Kapuzinergruft (The Emperor's Tomb) by Austrian author Joseph Roth. It was chosen as West Germany's official submission to the 45th Academy Awards for Best Foreign Language Film, but did not receive a nomination. It was also entered into the 1972 Cannes Film Festival.

== Cast ==
- András Bálint - Trotta
- Rosemarie Fendel - Almarin
- Doris Kunstmann - Elisabeth Kovacs
- Elma Bulla - Trotta's Mother
- Heinrich Schweiger - Elisabeth's Father
- Tamás Major - Mr. Reisiger
- István Iglódi - Chojnicki
- Mari Törőcsik
- Ferenc Kállai
- Liliana Nelska

== See also ==
- List of submissions to the 45th Academy Awards for Best Foreign Language Film
- List of German submissions for the Academy Award for Best Foreign Language Film
