= Werner Enke =

German film actor and screenwriter (1941–2026)

- Born: 25 April 1941; Berlin, Germany
- Died: 20 July 2026 (aged 85); Munich, Bavaria, Germany
- Occupations: Actor, screenwriter
- Years active: 1963–2026

Werner Enke (25 April 1941 – 20 July 2026) was a German film actor and screenwriter. He died in Munich on 20 July 2026, at the age of 85.

== Selected filmography ==
- A Degree of Murder (dir. Volker Schlöndorff, 1967)
- Sugar Bread and Whip (1968)
- With Oak Leaves and Fig Leaf (dir. Franz-Josef Spieker, 1968)
- Go for It, Baby (dir. May Spils, 1968)
- Don't Fumble, Darling (dir. May Spils, 1970)
- Hau drauf, Kleiner (dir. May Spils, 1974)
- Beware of Schwarzenbeck (dir. May Spils, 1979)
- Mit mir nicht, du Knallkopp (dir. May Spils, 1983)

== Bibliography ==
- Hake, Sabine. German National Cinema. Routledge, 2013.
