= Vier gegen die Bank (1976 film) =

1976 film

- Based on: The Nixon Recession Caper by Ralph Maloney
- Written by: Wolfgang Menge
- Directed by: Wolfgang Petersen
- Starring: Harald Leipnitz; Walter Kohut; Günther Neutze; Herbert Bötticher
- Music by: Klaus Doldinger
- Country of origin: West Germany
- Original language: German

Production
- Producer: Peter Märthesheimer
- Cinematography: Jörg-Michael Baldenius
- Editor: Hannes Nikel
- Running time: 96 minutes
- Production company: Bavaria Film

Original release
- Release: December 7, 1976

Vier gegen die Bank is a 1976 German crime comedy television film directed by Wolfgang Petersen. It was adapted from the novel The Nixon Recession Caper by Ralph Maloney and was produced for the German television station ARD. In 2016 it was remade under the same title for theatrical release.

== Plot ==
Hartmut Wredel, a respected lawyer, is left unemployed by the recession. At his golf club he discovers that three other members have not paid their membership dues for a while. The men, out-of-work actor Peter Pagodi, fashion designer Benedict Hoffmann, and garage owner Gustav Blümel, have also been hit hard by the recession. Wredel convinces them that a bank robbery is the solution to their problems. They successfully carry out the plan and even escape imprisonment because the police blame the robbery on a separate group of terrorists who were planning to rob the same bank.

== Cast ==
- Harald Leipnitz as Peter Pagodi
- Walter Kohut as Hartmut Wredel
- Günther Neutze as Gustav Blümel
- Herbert Bötticher as Benedict Hoffmann
- Ingrid van Bergen as Uschi Blümel
- Christine Schuberth as Gaby Pagodi
- Karin Eickelbaum as Angelika Hoffmann
- Gitty Djamal as Christa Wredel
- Otto Sander as Bankleiter
- Hans Schulze as Hauptkommissar Röse
- Uwe Dallmeier as Kommissar Ludendorf
- Karl-Heinz von Hassel as Gangster Manfred
- Hans Dieter Trayer as Kriminalassistent
- Joachim Regelien as Erster Komplize
- Wolf Richard as Zweiter Komplize
- Ulli Chivall as Dritter Komplize
- Helmut Alimonta as Kfz-Meister
- Leopold Gmeinwieser as Taxifahrer
- Horst Pasderski as Feinkosthändler

== Production ==
The film was shot in and around Munich in July 1976.
