= Oliver B. Bumble =

Fictional bear in Dutch comic books by Marten Toonder

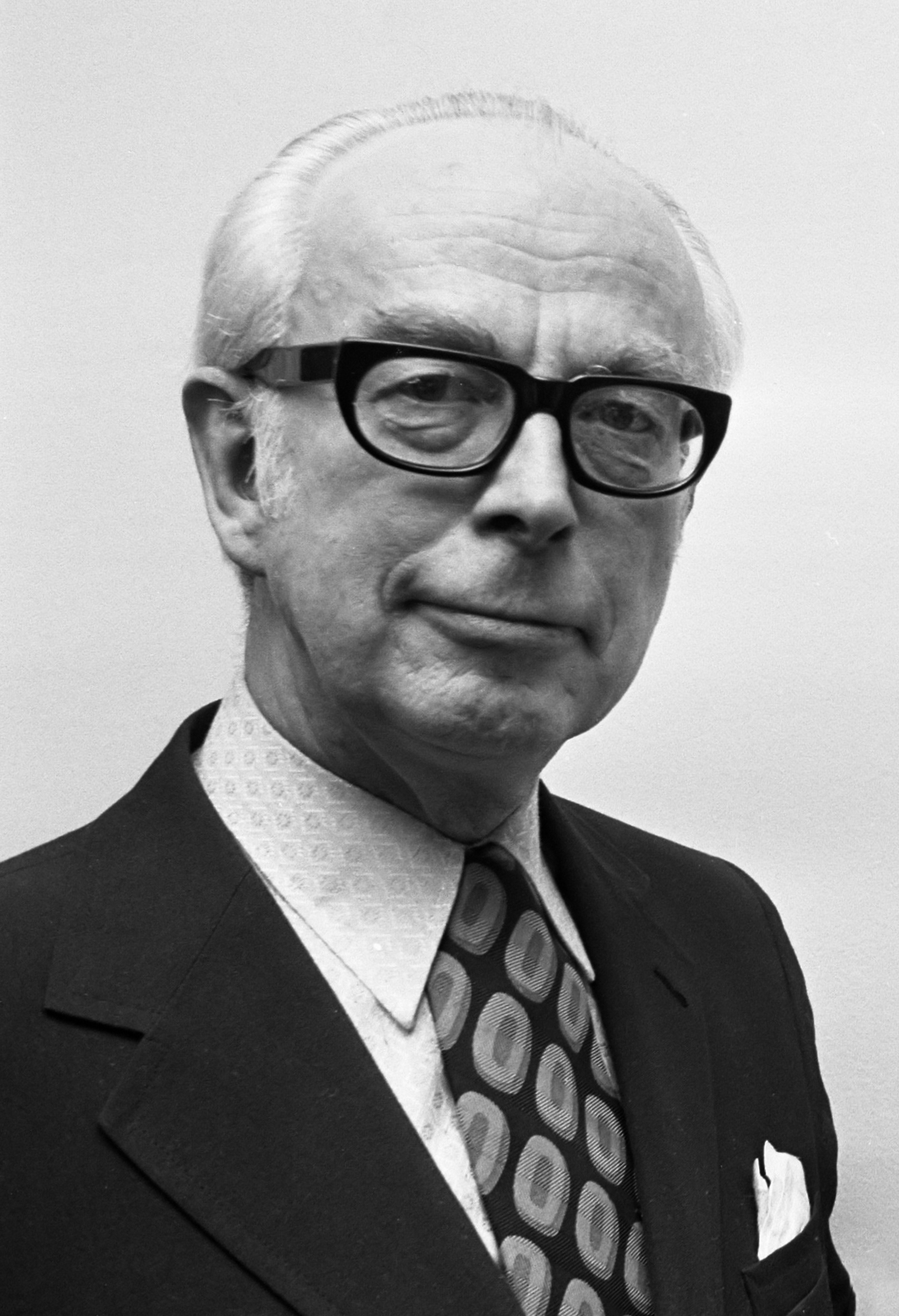
Marten Toonder in 1972

Oliver B. Bumble (Olivier B. Bommel in Dutch) is a fictional anthropomorphic bear, one of the two main characters in a Dutch comic book series written by Marten Toonder. The other is Tom Puss (Tom Poes), and the comic book bears the name of either of these characters.

== Publication history ==
The first Tom Puss stories were told as illustrated novels, published in daily installments in the Dutch newspaper De Telegraaf. Tom Puss first appeared as a replacement for the Mickey Mouse strip in 1941. It was not until later that Tom Puss became more identifiable as a comic strip.

Tom Puss and Oliver B. Bumble

Sir Oliver B. Bumble was introduced in 1941, in the third Tom Puss story. Initially, he was only a supporting character, but he soon became a second protagonist. As Tom Puss was noble and heroic, later stories came to depend on the flawed and kind-hearted Oliver B. Bumble as an initiator of events. The final story, published in 1986, ends the story with Bumble marrying his neighbor, Miss Doddel, and settling down.

There have been over 600 Tom Puss stories in total and most of them feature Oliver B. Bumble. Bumble and Puss' stories have been translated and published worldwide. An animated movie based on the series named Als je begrijpt wat ik bedoel ("If you know what I mean," one of Bumble's catch-phrases) was released in 1983. In English, it is alternately called The Dragon That Wasn't (Or Was He?) and Dexter the Dragon and Bumble the Bear. In the 1940s, Toonder created a number of short animated movies featuring the characters in commercials for Philips.

In February 2007, the Dutch Programme Foundation began a 440-part radio drama based on the series, hosted by Radio 4. The series ended in December 2009. There have been rumors of a new film and animation series.

== Character ==
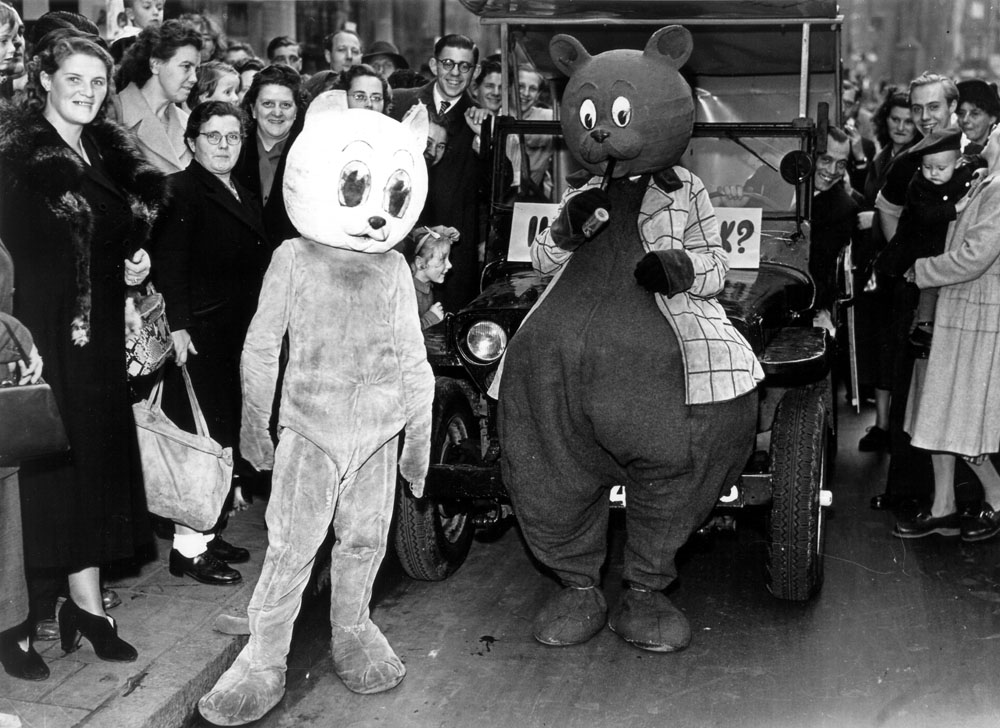
Sir Oliver and Tom Puss with the Oude Schicht in Amsterdam, October 4, 1949

Sir Oliver is a bear of nobility; an eloquent, though not always coherent, gentleman with a slight stutter when he's upset. He enjoys the finer things in life, like a good pipe, and tries to make a good impression with his peers in the "Kleine Club," the "Little Club", a rather exclusive affair. It includes members such as mayor Dickerdack, overly eager to delegate difficult tasks, and Bumble's arch-rival the Marquis de Canteclaer, who is also his neighbor and thinks that "this, err.. Bumble" is a parvenu. Bumble's membership is somewhat controversial and he's blackballed on several occasions.

Bumble is quite wealthy; he even makes it into the upper ten who own almost everything, but always tells others that money is of no importance and is generous to his friends and those in need. He lives in castle Bommelstein, where his butler Joost sees to his every need. He is a modest bear though; he always dresses in a simple checkered coat and his car, nicknamed "De Oude Schicht" ("The Old Bolt (of lightning)"), is reliable, but not extravagant. Extravagance is a trait Bumble doesn't possess, following his dear father's lessons of modesty and common sense, exemplified in a "simple yet nutritious meal", which is rarely simple but always nutritious. The phrase "een eenvoudige doch voedzame maaltijd" has become a colloquialism in Dutch.

He is a kind soul but he tends to act before he thinks. His compassion and sense of justice can sometimes move him to do great things, although it's usually others, most often Joost and Tom Puss, who do the actual work. He also tends to blame others for his own mistakes and rarely gives Tom Puss the credit he deserves for getting him out of trouble. As he has a "delicate constitution", he has no heart for conflict, but in the end he will always help his friends in need.

Bumble has two staunch admirers. The first is Miss Doddle, Bumble's Dulcinea and his prime source of fresh tea, courage and resolve in times of great emotional turmoil. She idolizes Bumble and thinks he's the smartest man in the world, even though Bumble is out of his depth more often than not. The second great admirer is the dwarf Kwetal who thinks Bumble has a big thinking-frame ("denkraam") and who blindly trusts his judgment. He is the source of some weird gadgets which wreak havoc in Bumble's life or work as a deus ex machina to solve the problems which Bumble's ill-conceived grand designs have caused.

Although Bumble has many flaws in his character, and maybe because of it, he's far more popular than Tom Puss and practically reduced the former hero to a sidekick. In many ways Bumble is an antihero, blundering blindly through life, forced by fate, one of several villains or Dorknoper, civil servant first class and tax-collector, to make decisions which greatly influence his world. Hence he is a more interesting figure than Tom Puss, who is a bit boring in contrast.

== Clarifications ==
The claim that the B. in Olivier B. Bommel would stand for Berendinus is semi-canonical at best. A middle name is not found in any of the original stories and —according to the author— did not exist. Bommel was intended to be an American, though it is possible that he did indeed return to ancestral grounds. The lone initial was part of the American attributes of the character. The source of Berendinus was the answer by an editor in the Tom Poes magazine, and thus one given with a semblance of authority, which explains the popularity of the claim.

Related to this is the play in the original series with the meanings of the Dutch word heer, which does mean gentleman, though it does not mean member of the nobility, which Bumble as an American would not be. He is very rich and tries to live like a gentleman. Another meaning is lord, as in (absolute) ruler; as owner of his castle, he turns out to have been the lord of the land for almost the entire series in the last story. "Sir" rather obscures this essential part of the character as it rather suggests some noble title under lordship. An acceptable translation might be Oliver B Bumble, Lord of the manor, most of all because in the very last story, there's a mentioning about the remaining manorial rights, that from now on will stay there forever.

== Catch phrases ==
Oliver B. Bumble uses several catch phrases:

- "If you know what I mean", usually used at the end of nearly any speech he made.
- "Like my dear father always said: ..... and I abide by that."
- "Money is of no consequence"
