= Rosemarie Fendel =

German actress (1927–2013)

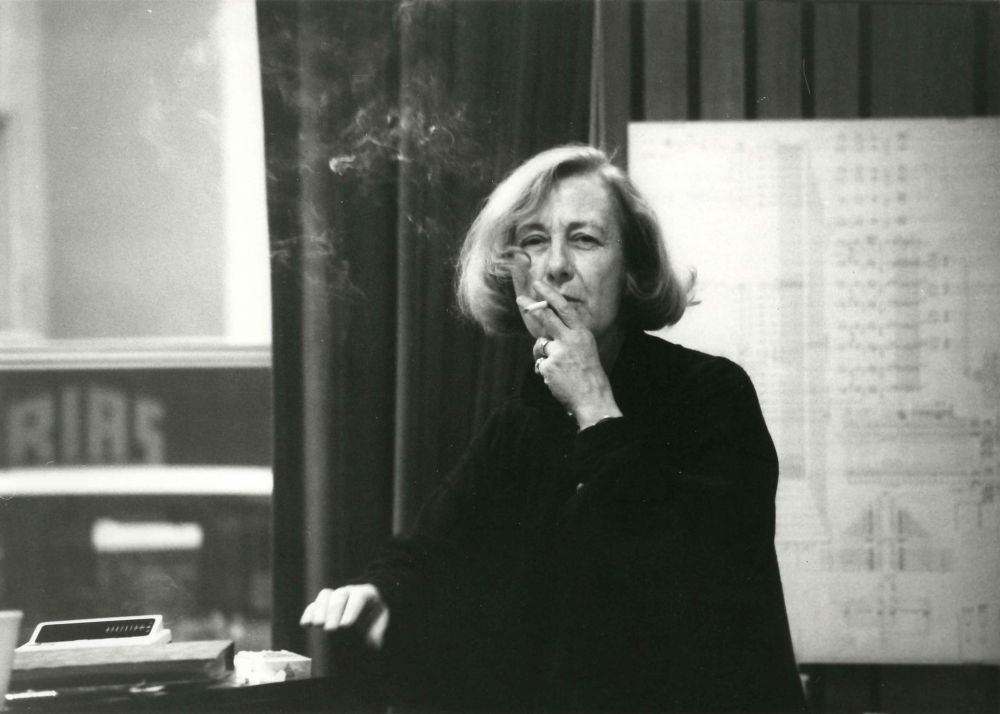
Fendel in 1986

Rosemarie Fendel (1927–2013) was a German actress who worked on the stage, in film, and television. She was also a voice actress and was the voice of notable actresses for German dubs of their work, including Elizabeth Taylor, Jeanne Moreau, and Annie Girardot. She won numerous awards for her work in film and television, and also directed and wrote a few screen productions herself. Her daughter is a German actress, Suzanne von Borsody.

== Career ==
=== Theater ===
Fendel began her acting career on stage in 1946, appearing at the Kammerspiele in Munich as a flower girl in a production of Girodoux's "Die Irre von Chaillot". She studied acting with the actress Maria Koppenhöfer. She was noticed by director and actor, Gustaf Gründgens, who brought her to act in productions in the Düsseldorfer Schauspielhaus as well as to perform in Darmstadt, Munich and Frankfurt. In 1957, she temporarily retired from the stage after the birth of her daughter, Suzanne von Borsody, who was born to her after she married actor and director Hans von Borsody.

She later returned to the stage, and in 1982, she had a notable performance in a production of Chekhov's The Cherry Orchardat the Frankfurt Schauspiel. She performed roles written for both men and women, in productions of plays by Bertolt Brecht and Miller. Other notable performances include roles in Heiner Müller's Quartet. Towards the end of her career, she routinely gave private and small performances of works by Goethe and Mascha Kaléko, often in her home in Frankfurt.

=== Film and television ===
Fendel appeared in several television series in the 1960s, most notably in the crime series Der Kommissar as the wife of Erik Ode. She also had roles in Dem Täter auf der Spur, Das Kriminalmuseum, Tatort, Der Havelkaiser, Freunde fürs Leben and Der Nachtkurier meldet.

Fendel also appeared in several films, including Trotta (1971) directed by Johannes Schaaf, an adaptation of a novel by Joseph Roth, and won a federal prize for her performance in the film. She is best known for her performance in The Sister (2010) directed by Margarethe von Trotta. In 1973, she won the Grimme Prize for her performance in Im Reservat, written by Peter Stripp and directed by Peter Beauvais. Other notable film roles include Alle Jahre wieder (1967), Tätowierung (1967), Dream City (1973), Ödipussi (1988), Schtonk! (1992), Das Schwein – Eine deutsche Karriere (1994), Bonhoeffer: Agent of Grace (2000), Die Farben der Liebe (2003), Mensch Mutter (2006), and Das zweite Leben (2007). Her last film appearance was in a three-part series titled Hotel Adlon: A Family Saga (2013) filmed for ZDF. She won the Bavarian Television Prize for her role in Das zweite Leben.

=== Directing and writing ===
In 1973, Fendel assisted her long-time partner, director Johannes Schaaf, in writing the screenplay for his film Dream City. Following this, she wrote a screenplay for a television series, Der Alte, which was produced by ZDF. In 1980, she wrote and directed the television film Der Heuler. She also wrote the screenplay for Momo (1986).

=== Voice acting ===
During her retirement from the stage, Fendel worked as a voice actor and performed roles by Elizabeth Taylor, Jeanne Moreau, Simone Signoret, Lauren Bacall, Anne Bancroft, Myrna Loy, Dorothy Parker, Vanessa Redgrave, and Annie Girardot in German dubs. Her roles include dubbing of roles by Gina Lollobrigida in Pane, amore e fantasia (1927), and Simone Signoret in Les Diaboliques (1954).

== Life ==
Fendel was born in 1927 in Metternich near Koblenz, and spent her childhood in Berlin and Bohemia. During the course of her career, she lived in Munich, Düsseldorf, and Hamburg, eventually settling in Frankfurt. For several years she lived and worked with director Johannes Schaaf. She later married actor Hans von Borsody, and their daughter is the German actress, Suzanne von Borsody, She died at the age of 85 in her home in Frankfurt, after a short illness.

== Selected filmography ==
- Tattoo (1967), as Frau Lohmann
- Trotta (1971), as Almarin
- Dream City (1973), as Anna Sand
- Die Kette (1977, TV film), as Mary Rogers
- Heinrich Heine (1978, TV film), as Rahel Varnhagen
- Theodor Chindler (1979, TV miniseries), as Elisabeth Chindler
- The Assault of the Present on the Rest of Time (1985), as Frau von Gerlach
- Reise nach Weimar (1996, TV film), as Hilde La Rocca
- The Loneliness of the Crocodile (2000), as Frau Sperl
