= Harald Leipnitz =

German actor (1926–2000)

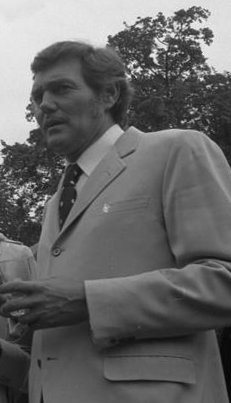
Leipnitz in 1971

Harald Leipnitz (22 April 1926 – 21 November 2000) was a German actor, who was born in Wuppertal and died in Munich of lung cancer.

== Filmography ==
- 1961: The Big Show (Uncredited)
- 1963: The Endless Night, as Wolfgang Spitz
- 1963: River of Evil, as Pedro
- 1964: The Curse of the Hidden Vault, as Jimmy Flynn
- 1965: Die Schlüssel (TV miniseries), as Eric Martin
- 1965: The Bandits of the Rio Grande, as Ryan
- 1965: Girls Behind Bars, as Pfarrer Johannes
- 1965: Diamond Walkers, as Mike Johnson
- 1965: The Oil Prince, as The Oil Prince
- 1965: The Sinister Monk, as Inspector Bratt
- 1966: I Am Looking for a Man, as Gregor
- 1966: Agent 505: Death Trap in Beirut, as Fred Köhler
- 1966: Sperrbezirk, as Bernie Kallmann
- 1966: Playgirl, as Siegbert 'Bert' Lahner
- 1966: The Brides of Fu Manchu, as Nikki Sheldon
- 1966: Countdown to Doomsday, as Alan Shepperton
- 1966: Liselotte of the Palatinate, as Herzog von Orléans
- 1966: Winnetou and Old Firehand, as Silers
- 1967: The Sweet Sins of Sexy Susan, as Ferdinand
- 1967: Creature with the Blue Hand, as Inspector Craig
- 1967: Le Treizième Caprice, as Golo
- 1967: Le Grand Dadais, as Monsieur Poloni
- 1967: Glorious Times at the Spessart Inn, as Frank Green
- 1968: Sugar Bread and Whip, as Robert Arnold
- 1968: Sexy Susan Sins Again, as Ferdinand
- 1968: Emma Hamilton, as Harry Featherstone
- 1968: 24 Hour Lover, as Georg 'George' Weissborn
- 1969: Marquis de Sade: Justine, as Raymond
- 1969: House of Pleasure, as Ferdinand
- 1969: That Guy Loves Me, Am I Supposed to Believe That?, as Rolf Olvedi
- 1970: Frau Wirtin bläst auch gern Trompete (Sexy Susan Knows How...!), as Ferdinand
- 1970: Som hon bäddar får han ligga (Do You Believe in Swedish Sin?), as Horst Praterweiss
- 1970: Moonlighting Mistress, as Jan
- 1971: Großstadtprärie, as Zahnarzt Falk
- 1972: Not Dumb, The Bird, as Victor Masson
- 1973: All People Will Be Brothers, as Werner Mark
- 1973: The Sibyl Cipher, as Paul Holland
- 1973: The Bloody Vultures of Alaska (Hell Hounds of Alaska), as Mark Monty
- 1973: Libero, as Himself
- 1976: Derrick: Tote Vögel singen nicht (TV), as Wirt Schermann
- 1976: Anita Drögemöller und die Ruhe an der Ruhr, as Lampensiepen
- 1976: Vier gegen die Bank (TV film), as Peter Pagodi
- 1977: The Chinese Miracle, as Dr. Linkers
- 1977: Death or Freedom, as Oberster Kommandant (Obrist)
- 1977: Die Kette (TV film), as Inspector Harry Dawson
- 1978: Kneuss, as Schnaffelmann
- 1980: Musik auf dem Lande, as Harry Elmau
- 1983: Monaco Franze (TV series), as Man with Porsche
- 1985: Unsere schönsten Jahre (TV series), as Seibold
- 1986: Kir Royal (TV series), as Puppi
- 1987: Three Crazy Jerks, as Director
- 1988: Three Crazy Jerks II, as Hoteldirektor
- 1992: Immer Ärger mit Nicole, as Harald
- 1993: Cliffs of the Death (TV film), as Conrad
- 1993: Hunt for the Blue Diamond (TV film), as Jack Di Franco
- 1994-1995: Unsere Schule ist die beste (TV series), as Harald Schönauer
- 1995: Pizza Arrabbiata
- 1999: Our Island in the South Pacific, as Dr. Tietze
- 1999: Prosit Neujahr (directed by Leipnitz)
- 2001: Vortex, as Carl (final film role)
