= Die Konsequenz =

- Written by: Alexander Ziegler and Wolfgang Petersen
- Directed by: Wolfgang Petersen
- Starring: Jürgen Prochnow; Ernst Hannawald; Walo Lüönd; Edith Volkmann; Erwin Kohlund; Hans Irle; Erwin Parker; Alexander Ziegler; Werner Schwuchow; Hans-Michael Rehberg; Elisabeth Fricker; Hans Putz; Wolf Gaudlitz; Thomas Haerin; Carsten Neumann; Franz Kollasch; Alexis von Hagemeister; Jan Groth; Gerold Nölli; Franz Stiefel
- Music by: Nils Sustrate
- Country of origin: West Germany
- Original language: German

Production
- Producer: Bernd Eichinger
- Cinematography: Jörg-Michael Baldenius
- Editor: Johannes Nikel
- Running time: 100 minutes
- Production company: Solaris Film

Original release
- Release: 8 November 1977

Die Konsequenz (The Consequence) is a 1977 West German made for television film directed and co-written by Wolfgang Petersen, starring Jürgen Prochnow and Ernst Hannawald. The screenplay is an adaptation of the 1975 autobiographical novel of the same name by Alexander Ziegler, who also co-wrote with Petersen. The film premiered on ARD on 8 November 1977.

== Plot ==
Gay actor Martin Kurath is serving a prison sentence when he develops a friendship with Thomas Manzoni, the 16-year-old son of a prison guard. The two fall in love and yearn for Kurath's release. This triggers intense indignation in their surroundings. After Kurath is released a year later, Thomas tells his parents he is a homosexual and is disowned by his father. Kurath and Thomas move in together and Thomas enrolls in school. Thomas' father, however, has him arrested and committed to a brutal reformatory. Kurath obtains a fake passport and poses as a psychology doctoral candidate and helps Thomas escape with him to Germany. They are betrayed by a German homosexual friend of Kurath's who insists, in Kurath's absence, that Thomas become his lover in order to obtain a German residency permit. Thomas does so, but then refuses to sleep with the betrayer, is kicked out and prostitutes himself. Broken by these experiences, he voluntarily returns to the reformatory. When he comes of age and is released, he is so psychologically damaged that, despite a reunion with Kurath, he attempts suicide and is committed to a psychiatric hospital. He escapes and the film ends with a TV announcement that the police are looking for him and that members of the public should, if approaching him, treat him gently, as he is very depressed and confused.

== Literary original ==
The novel Die Konsequenz, which reads like the diary of Martin Kurath, is set in 1974. Swiss author Alexander Ziegler processed his personal experiences in the book. He himself served two and a half years in prison for "seducing an innocent underaged person to unnatural sexual acts".

== Film production ==
Alexander Ziegler contributed personally in the collaboration of Bernd Eichinger's 1977 adaptation of the novel and with the director Wolfgang Petersen. Die Konsequenz was made-for-television and filmed in black and white on 16 mm film. The soundtrack was composed by Nils Sustrate.

In March 2008, the film was released on DVD as part of a complete works edition of director Wolfgang Petersen's films (size: 22 DVDs).

== Controversy ==
The original version of the film received a Wertvoll (i.e. "recommended") quality award in the German Filmprädikat rating scheme, but was censored due to its perceived incendiary content in the first television broadcast on ARD on November 8, 1977, and regional affiliate Bayerischer Rundfunk refused to relay the transmission signal.

The novel and film had a pivotal role in West Germany in starting a dialogue on the topic of homosexuality, a role analogous to that played by the works of Roger Peyrefitte in France.

== Reviews ==
Despite somewhat dramatic decorations [...] it [the story] is, above all, a natural love story in black and white – one of the most private and credible to have been seen on the screen in a long time.

— Der Spiegel

== Awards ==
- Adolf Grimme Awards 1977

== Literature ==
- Alexander Ziegler: Die Konsequenz. ISBN 3-596-23407-7, Fischer-TB 3407, Frankfurt am Main, 1978
- Wolfgang Petersen and Ulrich Greiwe (editors): Die Resonanz. Briefe und Dokumente zum Film "Die Konsequenz" ISBN 3-596-23423-9, Fischer-TB 3423, Frankfurt am Main, 1980
