= 24 Hour Lover =

1968 film

- Directed by: Marran Gosov
- Written by: Marran Gosov
- Produced by: Rob Houwer
- Starring: Harald Leipnitz; Herbert Bötticher; Brigitte Skay
- Cinematography: Hubertus Hagen; Niklaus Schilling
- Edited by: Gisela Haller
- Music by: Martin Böttcher
- Production company: Rob Houwer Productions
- Distributed by: Constantin Film
- Release date: 20 December 1968
- Running time: 90 minutes
- Country: West Germany
- Language: German

24 Hour Lover (German: Bengelchen liebt kreuz und quer) is a 1968 West German comedy film directed by Marran Gosov and starring Harald Leipnitz, Herbert Bötticher and Brigitte Skay.

== Synopsis ==
Georg is a playboy bachelor whose lifestyle is an embarrassment to his brother Alfred, a schoolteacher who believes he will not be promoted unless Georg settles down and becomes respectable.

== Cast ==
- Harald Leipnitz as Georg 'George' Weissborn
- Sybille Mar as Irene Kaufmann
- Herbert Bötticher as Alfred Weissborn
- Brigitte Skay as Marion
- Monika Lundi as Lisa
- Renate Roland as Peggy
- Marianne Wischmann as Vera, Peggy's Mother
- Claudia Wedekind as Rosa
- Sylvie Beck as Monika
- Isolde Bräuner as Mia
- Werner Schwier as Doctor
- Jana Nováková as Ulla
- Doris Kiesow as Lenna
- Herbert Weissbach as Grandfather
- Inge Langen as Claudia
- Sammy Drechsel as Reporter
- Nino Korda as Konsul Gerhard
- Henry van Lyck as Winegrower
- Marran Gosov as Kaukasischer Kellner

== Bibliography ==
- Bock, Hans-Michael & Bergfelder, Tim. The Concise CineGraph. Encyclopedia of German Cinema. Berghahn Books, 2009.
- Gerhardt, Christina & Abel, Marco. Celluloid Revolt: German Screen Cultures and the Long 1968. Camden House, 2019.
- Paietta, Ann C. Teachers in the Movies: A Filmography of Depictions of Grade School, Preschool and Day Care Educators, 1890s to the Present. McFarland, 2007.
