= Wolfgang Petersen =

German filmmaker (1941–2022)

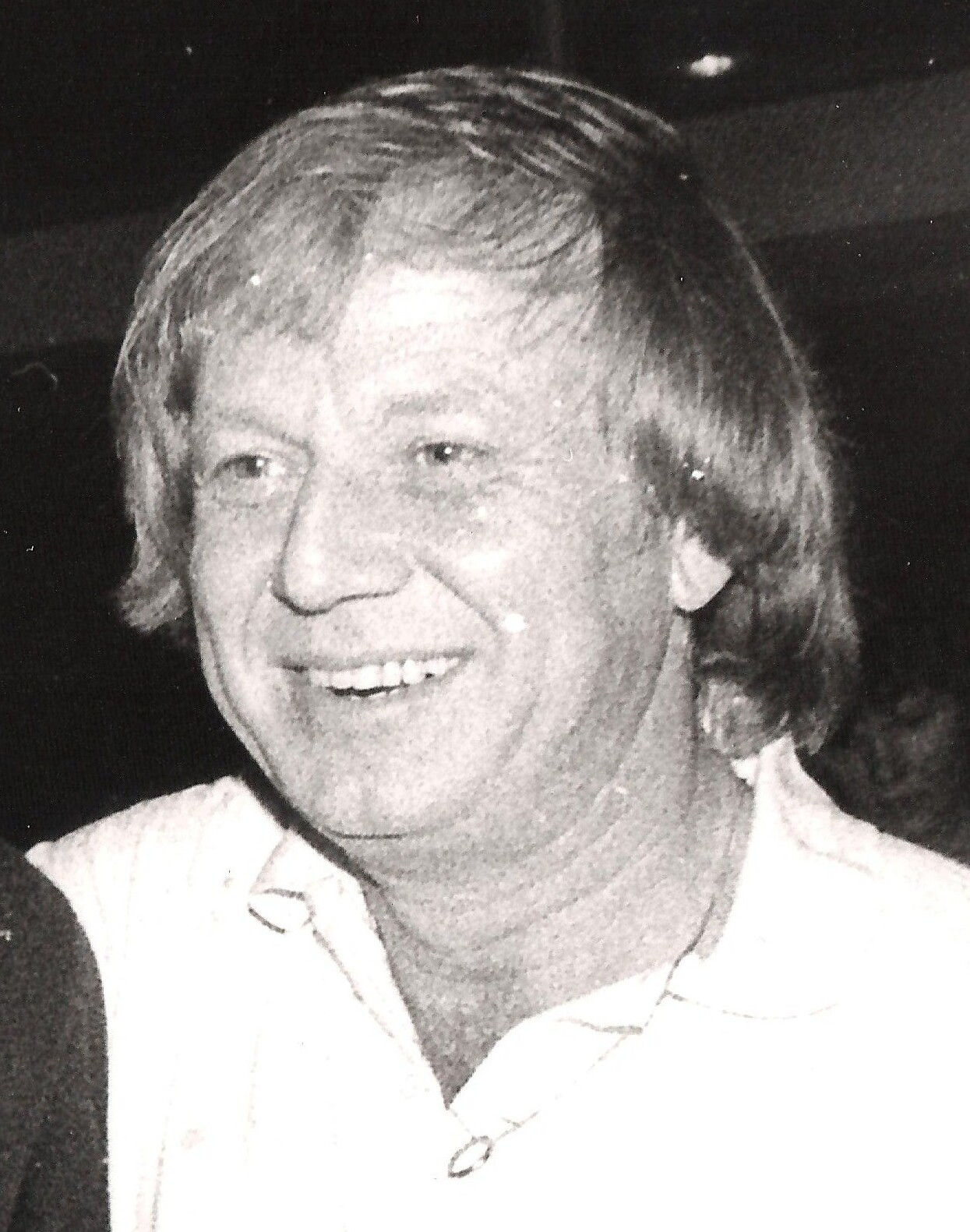
- Petersen in 1984
- Born: 14 March 1941; Emden, German Reich
- Died: 12 August 2022 (aged 81); Los Angeles, California, U.S.
- Citizenship: Germany; United States
- Education: Deutsche Film- und Fernsehakademie Berlin
- Occupations: Director; screenwriter; producer
- Years active: 1953–2016
- Spouses: Ursula Sieg (m. 1970; div. 1978) Maria Borgel-Petersen (m. 1978)
- Children: 1

Wolfgang Petersen (14 March 1941 – 12 August 2022) was a German film and television director, screenwriter and producer. His international breakthrough was the war film Das Boot (1981), which earned him Academy Award nominations for Best Director and Best Adapted Screenplay. He subsequently directed the blockbuster fantasy film The NeverEnding Story (1984), based on the 1979 novel of the same name.

After moving to the United States in the mid-1980s, Petersen directed his first American production, the science-fiction film Enemy Mine (1985). He directed a variety of major studio productions through the 1990s to the mid-2000s, including In the Line of Fire (1993), Outbreak (1995), Air Force One (1997), The Perfect Storm (2000), Troy (2004) and Poseidon (2006).

In addition to his Oscar nominations, Petersen won three Bambi Awards, a Bavarian Film Award and a German Film Award. He was also a founding member of the Deutsche Filmakademie.

== Early life ==
Petersen was born on 14 March 1941 in the northern harbour city, just a few miles from the Netherlands, Emden, the son of a naval officer. From 1953 to 1960, Petersen attended the Gelehrtenschule des Johanneums in Hamburg.

He made his first films with an 8 mm camera while still at school. In the 1960s he was directing plays at Hamburg's Ernst Deutsch Theater. After studying theater in Berlin and Hamburg, Petersen attended the Film and Television Academy in Berlin (1966–1970).

== Career ==
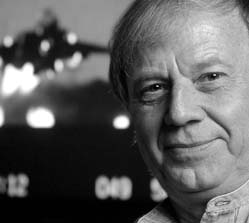
Petersen at the filming location of Air Force One

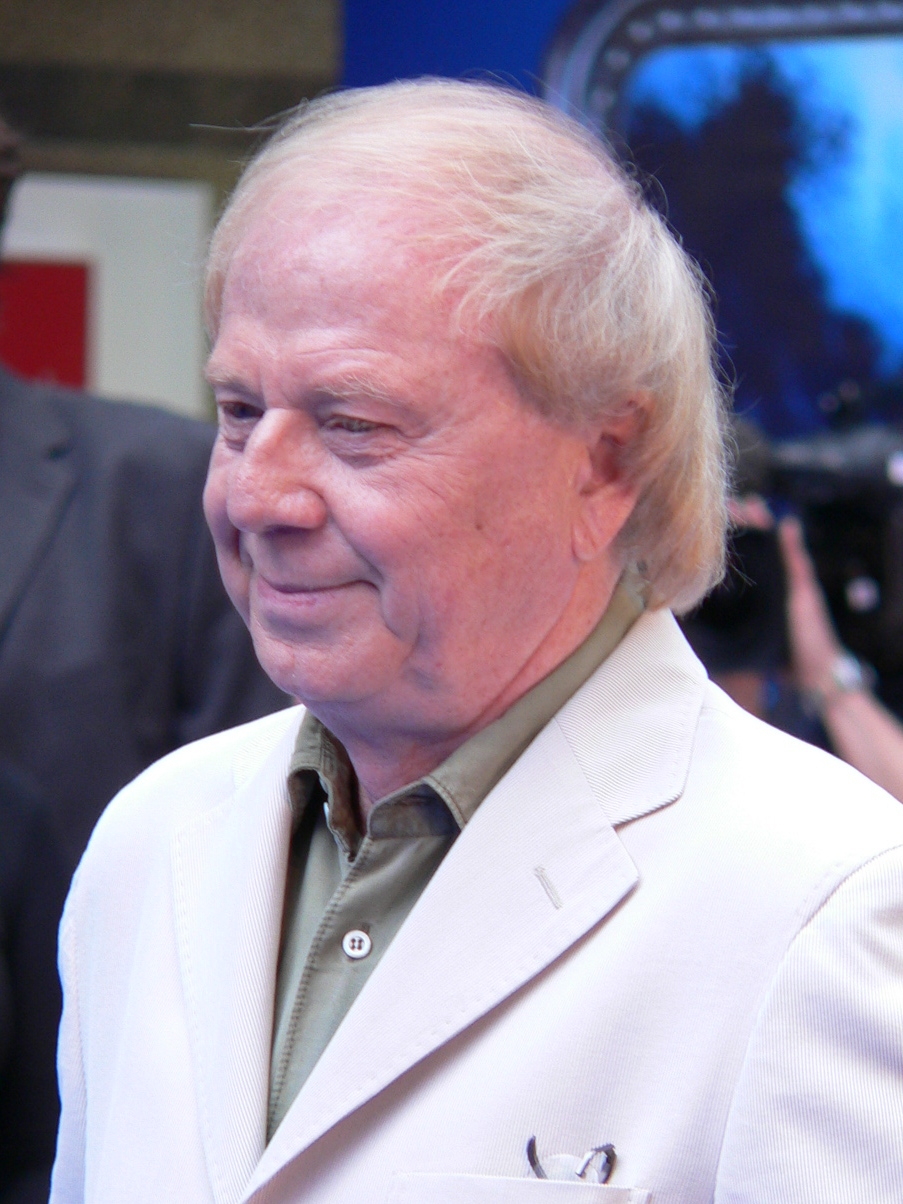
Petersen in 2006

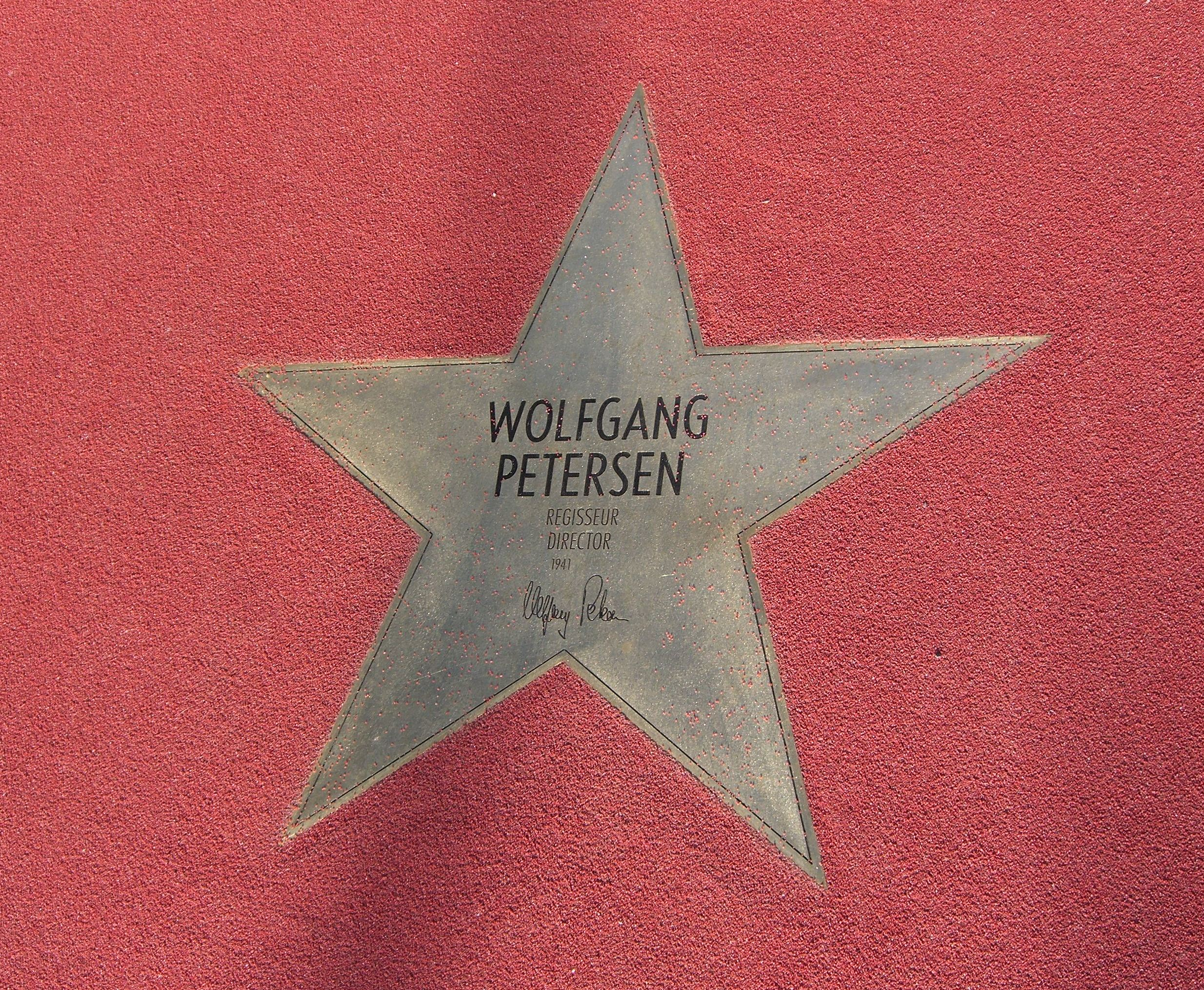
Petersen's star on the Boulevard der Stars

Petersen's first productions were for German television and it was during his work on the popular German Tatort (Crime Scene) TV series that he first met and worked with the actor Jürgen Prochnow — who would later appear as the U-boat captain in Petersen's famous Das Boot. The most famous of his Tatort episodes is Reifezeugnis (Maturity Certificate) from 1977 with the young Nastassja Kinski. He shot 6 Tatort episodes.

Petersen made his first theatrical feature film in 1974, the psychological thriller One or the Other of Us, based on the novel Einer von uns beiden by Horst Bosetzky and published anonymously under his pseudonym and starring Jürgen Prochnow. He next directed the 1977 film Die Konsequenz, a black/white adaptation of Alexander Ziegler's autobiographical novel of homosexual love. In its time, the film was considered so radical that when first broadcast in Germany, the Bavarian network Bayerischer Rundfunk turned off the transmitters rather than broadcast it.

His next feature was the World War II epic Das Boot, released in early 1982. The film chronicles the experiences of a German submarine crew engaged in the "Battle of the Atlantic". Though not an immediate financial success, the film received highly positive reviews and was nominated for six Academy Awards, two of which (for Best Director and Best Adapted Screenplay) went to Petersen; he was also nominated for a BAFTA Award and DGA Award. The film starred Jürgen Prochnow as the U-boat Captain, who became a good example of Petersen's action characters, a man at war who confronts danger and fate at sea.

After The NeverEnding Story (1984), Petersen's first English-language film, he directed Enemy Mine (1985), which was not a critical or box office success. In the six-year interim between Enemy Mine and Shattered (1991), Petersen developed at Warner Bros. a version of Phantom of the Opera set in Nazi-occupied France. It was written by James Dearden and Petersen wanted Dustin Hoffman for the role of the Phantom.

He hit his stride in 1993 with the assassination thriller In the Line of Fire. Starring Clint Eastwood as an angst-ridden presidential Secret Service guard, In the Line of Fire gave Petersen the box office clout he needed to direct another suspense thriller, Outbreak (1995), starring Dustin Hoffman. The 1997 Petersen blockbuster Air Force One did very well at the box office, with generally positive critical reviews from movie critics. For both Air Force One and Outbreak, Petersen teamed up with the German cinematographer Michael Ballhaus, who has also worked frequently with director Martin Scorsese.

By 1998, Petersen was an established Hollywood director, with the power to both re-release his classic Das Boot in a new director's cut and to helm star-studded action-thrillers. As such, he was originally considered to direct the first movie in the Harry Potter film series, Harry Potter and the Philosopher's Stone. Petersen pulled out of the running in March 2000.

In the 2000s, Petersen continued to direct two summer blockbusters, the films The Perfect Storm (2000) and Troy (2004). The success of the former helped his Radiant Productions company to sign a deal with Warner Bros. In 2003, he was set to direct a Batman vs. Superman film, but deciding to make Troy instead.

Petersen's $160 million epic film Poseidon, a re-telling of the 1969 Paul Gallico novel The Poseidon Adventure (previously adapted for the 1972 disaster film), was released by Warner Bros. in May 2006. The film performed poorly in the U.S., barely exceeding $60 million in domestic box office receipts by early August, but international sales surpassed $121 million.

Although hired to direct the film adaptation of Ender's Game by Orson Scott Card that was scheduled for release in 2008, he later "moved on" from the project. His potential projects included a live-action adaptation of the 2006 anime film Paprika and a film adaptation of the science fiction novel Old Man's War.

After a ten-year hiatus, Petersen returned in 2016 as director of the heist comedy Vier gegen die Bank, his first German-language film since Das Boot in 1981.

== Personal life ==
Petersen's first marriage was with actress Ursula Sieg; they had a son. In 1978, he married his assistant Maria Borgel. Petersen moved to Los Angeles in 1986 and subsequently acquired American citizenship.

== Death ==
Petersen died of pancreatic cancer on 12 August 2022, at the age of 81, at his home in Brentwood, Los Angeles.

== Filmography ==
=== Short film ===
Year	Title	Director	Writer
1968	Die rote Fahne	Yes	No
1969	Ich nicht	Yes	Yes
1969	Der Eine, der Andere	Yes	Yes

=== Feature film ===
Year	Title	Director	Producer	Writer
1981	Das Boot	Yes	No	Yes
1984	The NeverEnding Story	Yes	No	Yes
1985	Enemy Mine	Yes	No	No
1991	Shattered	Yes	Yes	Yes
1993	In the Line of Fire	Yes	Executive	No
1995	Outbreak	Yes	Yes	No
1997	Air Force One	Yes	Yes	No
1999	Bicentennial Man	No	Yes	No
2000	The Perfect Storm	Yes	Yes	No
2004	Troy	Yes	Yes	No
2006	Poseidon	Yes	Yes	No
2016	Vier gegen die Bank	Yes	Yes	No

=== Television ===
TV movies

Year	Title	Director	Writer
1965	Stadt auf Stelzen	Yes	No
1972	Anna und Totò	Yes	No
1973	Smog	Yes	No
1973	Van der Valk und die Reichen	Yes	No
1974	Aufs Kreuz gelegt	Yes	No
1975	Die Stadt im Tal	Yes	No
1975	Stellenweise Glatteis	Yes	No
1976	Hans im Glück	Yes	No
1976	Vier gegen die Bank	Yes	No
1977	Planübung	Yes	Yes
1977	Die Konsequenz	Yes	Yes
1978	Schwarz und weiß wie Tage und Nächte	Yes	No

TV series

Year	Title	Director	Writer	Executive producer	Notes
1971–1977	Tatort	Yes	Yes	No	Directed 6 episodes; Wrote 2 episodes
2001–2003	The Agency	No	No	Yes	4 episodes

== Critical reception ==
Year	Film	Rotten Tomatoes	Ref.
1981	Das Boot	98%	
1984	The NeverEnding Story	81%	
1985	Enemy Mine	61%	
1991	Shattered	31%	
1993	In the Line of Fire	96%	
1995	Outbreak	60%	
1997	Air Force One	76%	
2000	The Perfect Storm	47%	
2004	Troy	54%	
2006	Poseidon	33%	
