= That Guy Loves Me, Am I Supposed to Believe That? =

1969 film

- Directed by: Marran Gosov
- Written by: Florian Hopf; Klaus Lemke; Marran Gosov
- Produced by: Felix Hock; Horst Wendlandt
- Starring: Uschi Glas; Harald Leipnitz; Stefan Behrens.
- Cinematography: Werner Kurz; Robert van Ackeren
- Edited by: Jane Seitz
- Music by: Johnny Harris
- Production company: Rialto Film
- Distributed by: Inter-Verleih
- Release date: 5 September 1969
- Running time: 89 minutes
- Country: West Germany
- Language: German

That Guy Loves Me, Am I Supposed to Believe That? (German: Der Kerl liebt mich - und das soll ich glauben?) is a 1969 West German comedy film directed by Marran Gosov and starring Uschi Glas, Harald Leipnitz and Stefan Behrens. The film's sets were designed by the art directors Christoph Hertling and Duscha Sypereck. Location shooting took place in West Berlin and Munich. Gosov was associated with the New German Cinema movement.

== Synopsis ==
Unable to afford the rent for her Berlin apartment, Tony impulsively decides to leave and move to Bavaria. She hitchhike and encounters a smooth but shady antiques dealer Rolf and a more awkward inventor Stefan, both of whom fall in love with her. When the two meets she worries they will be jealous, but in fact they strike up a close friendship and almost overlook her.

== Cast ==
- Uschi Glas as Tony
- Harald Leipnitz as Rolf Olvedi
- Stefan Behrens as Stefan
- Horst Janson as Rainer Forst
- Georg Hartmann as Kriminalinspektor
- Dieter Augustin as Horst
- Heidrun Hankammer as Helga
- Gerd Lohmeyer as Klaus
- Marran Gosov as Mann in der Telefonzelle
- Horst Wendlandt as Porschefahrer
- Ekkehard Fritsch as Vermieter
- Willy Schultes as 1. Trödler
- Johannes Buzalski as 2. Trödler

== Bibliography ==
- Bock, Hans-Michael & Bergfelder, Tim. The Concise CineGraph. Encyclopedia of German Cinema. Berghahn Books, 2009.
- Kramp, Joachim· Hallo! Hier spricht Edgar Wallace: die Geschichte der deutschen Kriminalfilmserie 1959–1972. Schwarzkopf & Schwarzkopf, 2001.
