= Inge Marschall =

German actress

- Born: 4 November 1943 (age 82); German-occupied Czechoslovakia
- Occupations: Actress, Model
- Years active: 1968–present

Inge Marschall is a Czech-born German model and film and television actress.

== Selected filmography ==
- The Duck Rings at Half Past Seven (1968)
- Go for It, Baby (1968)
- Old Barge, Young Love (1973)
- Auch ich war nur ein mittelmäßiger Schüler (1974)
- Spring Symphony (1983)
- Der Fahnder (1997)

== Bibliography ==
- Cowie, Peter (1977). World Filmography 1968. London: Tantivy Press. ISBN 978-0-498-01569-4.
