= Diamond Walkers =

1965 film

- Directed by: Paul Martin
- Starring: Harald Leipnitz; Joachim Hansen; Marisa Mell; Ann Smyrner; Brian O'Shaughnessy; Gert van den Bergh; Patrick Mynhardt
- Release date: January 1, 1965
- Running time: +92 minutes
- Countries: South Africa; Germany
- Language: English

Diamond Walkers is a 1965 South African-West German adventure film directed by Paul Martin and starring Harald Leipnitz, Joachim Hansen and Marisa Mell. The film portrays diamond smuggling in South Africa. Its German title is Jagd auf blaue Diamanten.

== Cast ==
- Harald Leipnitz – Mike Johnson
- Joachim Hansen – Peter Wade
- Marisa Mell – Irene de Ridder
- Ann Smyrner – Karen Truter
- Brian O'Shaughnessy – Sergeant Barrett
- Gert Van den Bergh – Piet Truter
- Ivan Berold]] – Webber
- Bill Brewer– De Ridder
- Mervyn John – Bill Jenkins
- James White – Harris
- Patrick Mynhardt – Kelly
- Simon Sabela – Lobata (Ngela)
- John Marcus – Butu
- Barney Sidwaba - Gang Leader
- Morgan Langa – 1st African Policeman
- Jose Sithole – 2nd African Policeman
