= Alexander Ziegler (Swiss writer) =

Swiss writer and actor (1944–1987)

Alexander Ziegler (8 March 1944 in Zurich – 11 August 1987 in Zurich) was a Swiss author and actor.

Ziegler studied drama at the Max Reinhardt Seminar in Wien (1960/1961). He was an actor in Spring Awakening, a play by Frank Wedekind, in 1964. He was also an actor in the American television series Boys and Girls, created by Fred Mallow.

Openly gay, in 1966, he was imprisoned for two years because of his gay friendship with a 16-year-old named Stephan. While in prison, he wrote his first work, Labyrinth (1966). After he was released from prison, he worked as a journalist and author from 1971 to 1979 for the German gay magazine DU&ICH. He wrote many other articles and books.

In November 1977, his work Die Konsequenz was filmed and shown on German television. Actors in the film Die Konsequenz were Jürgen Prochnow as Martin Kurath and Ernst Hannawald as Thomas Manzoni.

Ziegler committed suicide, aged 43, in Zurich by overdosing on tranquilizers.

== Works by Ziegler ==
- Labyrinth, 1970
- Die Konsequenz, 1975
- Kein Recht auf Liebe, 1978
- Eines Mannes Liebe, 1980
- Gesellschaftsspiele, 1980
- Angstträume, 1981
- Die Zärtlichen, 1982
- Ich bekenne, 1985
- Halunkengelächter, 1985
