= Sugar Bread and Whip =

1968 film

- Directed by: Marran Gosov
- Written by: Vít Olmer; Marran Gosov
- Produced by: Rob Houwer
- Starring: Helga Anders; Roger Fritz; Harald Leipnitz
- Cinematography: Werner Kurz
- Edited by: Gisela Haller
- Music by: Hans Posegga
- Production company: Rob Houwer Productions
- Distributed by: Constantin Film
- Release date: 21 August 1968
- Running time: 85 minutes
- Country: West Germany
- Language: German

Sugar Bread and Whip (German: Zuckerbrot und Peitsche) is a 1968 West German crime drama film directed by Marran Gosov and starring Helga Anders, Roger Fritz and Harald Leipnitz. It was shot on location around Munich. The title is a German-language expression similar to the English-language carrot and stick metaphor.

== Synopsis ==
A male model is tired of his constant posing with luxury goods that he cannot himself afford and decides to commit a bank robbery. Things are complicated by his relationship with the married Helga.

== Cast ==
- Helga Anders as Helga Arnold
- Roger Fritz as Roger
- Harald Leipnitz as Robert Arnold
- Jürgen Jung as Jörg
- Helmut Hanke as Helmut
- Dieter Augustin as Augustin
- Gudrun Vöge as Gudrun
- Monika Lundi as Franziska
- Walter Gnilka as Juwelier Nicolodi Katz
- Nico Vogler as Fotograf
- Hans Wengefeld as Polizist
- Werner Enke as Toter Verkäufer
- Jürgen Draeger as Regisseur
- Günter Becker as Inspektor

== Bibliography ==
- Bock, Hans-Michael & Bergfelder, Tim. The Concise CineGraph. Encyclopedia of German Cinema. Berghahn Books, 2009.
- Gerhardt, Christina & Abel, Marco. Celluloid Revolt: German Screen Cultures and the Long 1968. Camden House, 2019.
