= Gila von Weitershausen =

German actress (born 1944)

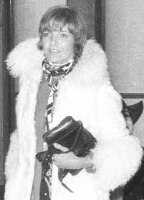
- von Weitershausen leaving the Metro-Kino in 1970
- Born: Gisela Freiin von Weitershausen; 21 March 1944 (age 81); Trebnitz, Germany
- Occupation: Actress
- Spouses: Martin Lüttge (m. 1966; div. 1972) Hartmut Wahle (m. 1994; died 2020)
- Partner: Louis Malle (1970–1973)
- Children: 1

Gisela "Gila" Freiin von Weitershausen (German: [ˈɡiː.la fɔn ˈvaɪ.̯tɐs,haʊ̯zn̩]; born 21 March 1944) is a German actress. Born in Trebnitz (today Trzebnica), Lower Silesia, Germany (today Poland) into an aristocratic family, she has three brothers and two sisters and is the great-granddaughter of former German Chancellor Georg Graf von Hertling.

Gila von Weitershausen became popular in the late 1960s when she appeared in German comedy films, for example alongside Uschi Glas. One of the films from that period about Swinging Sixties Bavaria, Engelchen, gave her the nickname Engelchen ("Little Angel"), which was used by the tabloid press for decades. In one of her best-known roles, she played a prostitute in the 1971 film Murmur of the Heart. She also appeared several times as "Rowena" in the British TV series Arthur of the Britons. By common consensus one of her best performances was in Circle of Deceit (1981), a film directed by Volker Schlöndorff, where she played with Hanna Schygulla and Bruno Ganz. Von Weitershausen regularly appears in television movies to this day.

She was married to fellow actor Martin Lüttge from 1966 until 1972. Between 1970 and 1973, she had a relationship with movie director Louis Malle, who is the father of her son, Manuel Cuotemoc (born 1971). Since 1994, she has been married to Hartmut Wahle.

== Selected filmography ==
- Glorious Times at the Spessart Inn (1967), as Gundel
- Angel Baby (1968), as Katja
- Zur Hölle mit den Paukern (1968), as Helena Taft
- The Magnificent Tony Carrera (1968), as Ursula Beaulieu
- Up the Establishment (1969), as Helene Wohlfahrt
- Charley's Uncle (1969) as "Charley" Carla Werner
- Student of the Bedroom (1970), as Nicci Krüger
- Don't Fumble, Darling (1970), as Christine
- 11 Uhr 20 (1970, TV miniseries), as Maria Wassem
- Slap in the Face (1970), as Eva
- Murmur of the Heart (1971), as Freda
- X312 - Flight to Hell (1971), as Steffi
- Bloody Friday (1972), as Marion Lotzmann
- My Daughter, Your Daughter (1972), as Hella Mattes
- Arthur of the Britons (1972, TV series), as Rowena
- Cry of the Black Wolves (1972), as Frona Williams
- The Pedestrian (1973), as Karin
- The Sibyl Cipher (1973), as Sybille Loredo
- When Mother Went on Strike (1974), as Gloria Perkin
- Death Rite (1976), as Martine
- Thaw (1977), as Jutta
- Schwarz und weiß wie Tage und Nächte (1978), as Marie Rosenmund
- The Unicorn (1978), as Birga Kristlein
- Confused Feelings (1981, TV film), as Anna
- Circle of Deceit (1981), as Greta Laschen
- Blood and Honor: Youth Under Hitler (1982, TV miniseries), as Ruth Mönkmann
- The Roaring Forties (1982), as Émilie Dubisson
- The Captain's Doll (1983, TV film), as Countess Johanna zu Rassentlow
- Trenchcoat (1983), as Eva Werner
- Patrik Pacard (1984, TV miniseries), as Katrin Pacard
- Der Landarzt (1987–1995, TV series, 69 episodes), as Annemarie Mattiesen
- Die Wilsheimer (1987, TV series, 6 episodes), as Lilo Ziegler
- Lorentz & Söhne (1988, TV series, 11 episodes), as Gertrud Bienger
- Love and Fear (1988), as Erika
- Itinerary of a Spoiled Child (1988), as German tourist
