= Johannes Buzalski =

German actor (1918–1977)

- Born: 24 August 1918; German Empire
- Died: July 1977 (aged 58); West Germany
- Occupation: Actor
- Years active: 1949–1977

Johannes Buzalski (1918–1977) was a German film and television actor.

== Selected filmography ==
- Hello, Fraulein! (1949)
- Jonny Saves Nebrador (1953)
- The Confession of Ina Kahr (1954)
- Heroism after Hours (1955)
- The Beggar Student (1956)
- Through the Forests and Through the Trees (1956)
- Go for It, Baby (1968)
- So Much Naked Tenderness (1968)
- That Guy Loves Me, Am I Supposed to Believe That? (1969)
- Mark of the Devil (1970)
- Don't Fumble, Darling (1970)
- Schulmädchen-Report 3. Teil - Was Eltern nicht mal ahnen (1972) - Hausmeister Pfeiffer (uncredited)
- Ludwig: Requiem for a Virgin King (1972) - Emmanuel Geibel / Hitler
- Lehrmädchen-Report (1972) - Freier
- The Salzburg Connection (1972) - Telephone Technician (uncredited)
- Die liebestollen Apothekerstöchter (1972) - Patient (uncredited)
- Gefährlicher Sex frühreifer Mädchen 2: Höllisch heiße Mädchen (1972) - Georg Seidel - Vater von Angelika
- Housewives on the Job (1973) - Klempner
- Mark of the Devil Part II (1973) - Advocate
- Skihaserl-Report (1973) - Betrunkener
- Liebesgrüße aus der Lederhos'n (1973) - Ludwig Schneider
- Geilermanns Töchter - Wenn Mädchen mündig werden (1973) - Brandstifter am Puff
- Laß jucken Kumpel 2. Teil: Das Bullenkloster (1973) - Erwin Kutter
- Der Bumsladen-Boß (1973) - Gangster
- Auch Ninotschka zieht ihr Höschen aus (1973) - Mann in Cafe (uncredited)
- Sally - heiß wie ein Vulkan (1973) - Polizist (uncredited)
- Unterm Dirndl wird gejodelt (1973) - Wirt
- Hau drauf, Kleiner (1974) - Schaper
- Die Stoßburg (1974) - Gerichtssekretär
- Schulmädchen-Report. 7. Teil: Doch das Herz muß dabei sein (1974) - Portier (uncredited)
- Laß jucken, Kumpel 3. Teil - Maloche, Bier und Bett (1974) - Erwin Kutter
- Liebesgrüße aus der Lederhose 2. Teil: Zwei Kumpel auf der Alm (1974) - Erwin Kutter
- The Enigma of Kaspar Hauser (1974)
- Krankensaal 6 (1974) - Postbeamter
- Hurra... die deutsche Sex-Partei (1974) - Spanner
- Laß jucken, Kumpel 5: Der Kumpel läßt das Jucken nicht (1975) - Erwin Kutter
- Jagdrevier der scharfen Gemsen (1975) - Portier
- Champagner aus dem Knobelbeche (1975) - Schmoll
- Sex-Express in Oberbayern (1977)
- Uncle Silas (1977, TV Series) - Torfstecher Hawkes
- Hitler: A Film from Germany (1977) - Hitler als Anstreicher / Eva Braun-Puppenspieler / Mann der Gesellschaft 1923
- Verrückt nach steilen Kurven (1977) - Doktor
- Der Hauptdarsteller (1977) - Betrunkener Mann

== Bibliography ==
- Eric Rentschler. The Films of G.W. Pabst: an extraterritorial cinema. Rutgers University Press, 1990.
