= Tattoo (1967 film) =

1967 film

- Film poster
- Directed by: Johannes Schaaf
- Written by: Johannes Schaaf; Günter Herburger
- Produced by: Rob Houwer
- Starring: Helga Anders
- Cinematography: Petrus R. Schlömp
- Edited by: Dagmar Hirtz
- Release date: 14 July 1967
- Running time: 86 minutes
- Country: West Germany
- Language: German

Tattoo (German: Tätowierung) is a 1967 West German film directed by Johannes Schaaf. The film was selected as the German entry for the Best Foreign Language Film at the 40th Academy Awards, but was not accepted as a nominee. It was also entered into the 17th Berlin International Film Festival. The film won three German Film Awards.

== Cast ==
- Helga Anders - Gaby
- Christof Wackernagel - Benno
- Rosemarie Fendel - Frau Lohmann
- Alexander May - Herr Lohmann
- Tilo von Berlepsch - Lohmann's Brother
- Heinz Meier - Sigi
- Heinz Schubert - Auctioneer
- Wolfgang Schnell - Simon
- Curt Ackermann - Voice of Lohmann's Brother (voice) (uncredited)

== See also ==
- List of submissions to the 40th Academy Awards for Best Foreign Language Film
- List of German submissions for the Academy Award for Best Foreign Language Film
