= Erica Beer =

German actress (1925–2013)

Erica Beer (19 January 1925 – 27 December 2013) was a German film actress. She was born in Munich.

== Selected filmography ==
- Captive Soul (1952)
- The Last Waltz (1953)
- Heartbroken on the Moselle (1953)
- They Were So Young (1954) - Elise LeFevre
- Die goldene Pest (1954)
- 08/15 – Part 2 (1955) - Viola
- Winter in the Woods (1956) - Simone
- Black Forest Melody (1956) - Harriet Morton
- Der Glockengießer von Tirol (1956) - Lia Serrana, Schauspielerin
- My Father, the Actor (1956) - Olympia Renée
- Flucht in die Tropennacht (1957) - Barbara
- Kindermädchen für Papa gesucht (1957) - Monika Bärwald
- And Lead Us Not Into Temptation (1957) - Sekretärin
- My Ninety Nine Brides (1958) - Regina Hale
- Your Body Belongs to Me (1959)
- Crime After School (1959) - Erna Kallies
- A Doctor of Conviction (1959) - Margot, eine Barfrau
- Arzt ohne Gewissen (1959) - Sabine
- Abschied von den Wolken (1959) - Cecily Sims
- That's No Way to Land a Man (1959) - Vera Reinhardt
- The Crimson Circle (1960) - Mrs. Carlyle
- Mit 17 weint man nicht (1960) - Erika Wieland
- Im sechsten Stock (1961) - Lady in Grey
- Das Halstuch (1962, TV miniseries) - Kim Marshall
- The Counterfeit Traitor (1962) - Klara Holtz
- DM-Killer (1965) - Gerda Bruck, Ronalds Frau
- Don't Fumble, Darling (1970) Schauspielerin in Geiselgasteig
- Deep End (1970) - Baths cashier
- King, Queen, Knave (1972) - Frieda
- Zwei himmlische Dickschädel (1974) - Fräulein Fabich
