= Herbert Bötticher =

German actor

- Born: 19 December 1928; Hannover, Germany
- Died: 8 October 2008 (aged 79); Düsseldorf, North Rhine-Westphalia, Germany
- Occupation: Actor
- Years active: 1960-2008 (film & TV)

Herbert Bötticher (1928–2008) was a German film, stage and television actor. He played supporting roles in German television for several decades.

== Selected filmography ==
- Hamlet (1961)
- Das Kriminalmuseum: Kaliber 9 (1967, TV series)
- Morning's at Seven (1968)
- 24 Hour Lover (1968)
- The Duck Rings at Half Past Seven (1968)
- Hotel Royal (1969, TV film)
- Dream City (1973)
- Lina Braake (1975)
- Vier gegen die Bank (1976, TV film)
- Ich heirate eine Familie (1983–86, TV series)

== Bibliography ==
- Paietta, Ann C. Teachers in the Movies: A Filmography of Depictions of Grade School, Preschool and Day Care Educators, 1890s to the Present. McFarland, 2007.
