= Angel Baby (1968 film) =

1968 film

- Directed by: Marran Gosov
- Written by: Marran Gosov; Franz Geiger
- Produced by: Rob Houwer
- Starring: Gila von Weitershausen; Ulli Koch; Hans Clarin
- Cinematography: Werner Kurz
- Edited by: Renate Schlösser; Gudrun Vöge; Enzio von Kühlmann-Stumm; Monica Wilde
- Music by: Jacques Loussier
- Production company: Rob Houwer Productions
- Distributed by: Constantin Film
- Release date: 8 March 1968
- Running time: 90 minutes
- Country: West Germany
- Language: German

Angel Baby (German: Engelchen - oder die Jungfrau von Bamberg) is a 1968 West German comedy film directed by Marran Gosov and starring Gila von Weitershausen, Ulli Koch and Hans Clarin. Location shooting took place in Bamberg and Munich.

== Cast ==
- Gila von Weitershausen as Katja
- Ulli Koch as Tim Schubert
- Hans Clarin as Graf
- Dieter Augustin as Gustl
- Christof Wackernagel as Franz
- Gudrun Vöge as Doris
- Edgar M. Böhlke as Volker
- Michael Luther as Ulrich
- Peter Wortmann as Christian
- Hartmut Neugebauer as Hans-Jürgen Hoffmann
- Helmut Markwort as Man in Elevator

== Bibliography ==
- Bock, Hans-Michael & Bergfelder, Tim. The Concise CineGraph. Encyclopedia of German Cinema. Berghahn Books, 2009.
- Bergfelder, Tim, Carter, Erica & Göktürk, Deniz. The German Cinema Book. Bloomsbury Publishing, 2020.
- Gerhardt, Christina & Abel, Marco. Celluloid Revolt: German Screen Cultures and the Long 1968. Camden House, 2019.
