= DU&ICH =

German LGBT magazine

- Cover of the August/September 2010 edition
- Chief editor: Andreas Hergeth
- Frequency: Monthly
- Circulation: 20,000 – 24,000
- Founded: 1969
- First issue: 1 October 1969; 57 years ago
- Final issue: July 2014
- Company: Jackwerth Verlag GmbH & Co. KG
- Country: Germany
- Based in: Berlin
- Language: German
- Website: du-und-ich.net

DU&ICH ("You and I") was a German LGBT magazine. DU&ICH distributed copies monthly. It was published by German company Jackwerth Verlag. The seat of the publishing company was in Berlin. It was in circulation between 1969 and 2014.

== History and profile ==
DU&ICH was founded in 1969. On 1 October 1969 the first edition was published. Founder of DU&ICH was Egon Manfred Strauss. First chief editor was Udo J. Erlenhardt. In the last 40 years over 465 editions of DU&ICH were printed. The magazine was the oldest German gay magazine —other magazines launched after DU&ICH were him in April 1970 and DON in May 1970.

In the 1970s, journalist Alexander Ziegler worked for DU&ICH. Journalist Dirk Ludigs worked for the magazine in the 2000s and Andreas Hergeth was the chief editor.

Later the magazine (alongside other popular magazines such as Spartacus, him, DOM and ADAM) have been criticised for blurring the lines between ages of consent and encouraging sex tourism (including child sex tourism) in their fetishised portrayals of non-white youths. Many of the sexual images in DU&ICH undoubtedly included children under 18; however, in 1975 the West German government only forbade imagery of under-14s in sexually explicit poses.

The magazine was cancelled in Summer 2014.

== See also ==
- List of magazines in Germany
