= Degree of Murder =

1967 German film starring Anita Pallenberg

- US theatrical release poster
- Directed by: Volker Schlöndorff
- Written by: Arne Boyer; Niklas Frank; Volker Schlöndorff; Gregor von Rezzori
- Produced by: Rob Houwer
- Starring: Anita Pallenberg; Werner Enke; Hans Peter Hallwachs
- Cinematography: Franz Rath
- Edited by: Claus von Boro
- Music by: Brian Jones
- Distributed by: Constantin Film (Germany); Universal Pictures (US)
- Release date: 19 April 1967
- Running time: 87 minutes
- Country: West Germany
- Language: German

Degree of Murder (German: Mord und Totschlag, French: Vivre à tout prix) is a 1967 West German crime drama film directed by Volker Schlöndorff and starring Anita Pallenberg, Werner Enke and Hans Peter Hallwachs. The film is mainly known because of the soundtrack composed by Brian Jones (founder and multi-instrumentalist of the Rolling Stones), Pallenberg's boyfriend at the time. The film won three German Film Awards. Part of the New German Cinema movement, it was entered into the 1967 Cannes Film Festival. It was filmed in Eastmancolor in West Germany in 1967.

== Plot ==
Marie shoots her ex-boyfriend with his own gun, after he attempts to force himself on her. Instead of reporting this to the police, she hires two men to help her dump the body in a construction site near an autobahn. While doing this, she becomes romantically involved with both men.

== Cast ==
- Anita Pallenberg as Marie
- Werner Enke as Hans
- Hans Peter Hallwachs as Gunther
- Manfred Fischbeck as Fritz
- Sonja Karzau
- Angela Hillebrecht
- Willy Harlander
- Kurt Bulau

== Home media ==
The film was released on Blu-ray and DVD in Germany in 2019.

== Soundtrack ==
A Degree of Murder

Soundtrack album by Brian Jones
- Released: Various unofficial release dates
- Recorded: 1966–1967
- Studio: IBC Studios
- Genre: bluegrass, folk, Eastern influences, R&B, rock, country
- Length: 29:36
- Producer: Brian Jones

The soundtrack by Brian Jones has never had an official release, possibly because of legal conflicts. Jones played on the soundtrack, while Yardbirds guitarist Jimmy Page, session pianist Nicky Hopkins, musician Peter Gosling, and Small Faces drummer Kenney Jones also contributed their respective instruments to the recording sessions, which took place between late 1966 and early 1967 at IBC Studios in London. Jones stated that "ranging from one musician to ten. I ran the gamut of line-ups – from the conventional brass combination to a country-band with Jew's harp, violin and banjo. In the main the musicians were established session – though some of the boys from the group also played." However, Rolling Stones bassist Bill Wyman has said that neither he nor drummer Charlie Watts participated, and Jones never specified exactly which members played on the soundtrack. Neither Mick Jagger nor Keith Richards have stated their involvement in the soundtrack. Jones also claimed that many session musicians were involved, but according to the session logs, most of the instrumentation was done by Jones himself.

In Rolling Stone issue #1171, Jimmy Page talks about working on the soundtrack. "Brian knew what he was doing. It was quite beautiful. Some of it was made up at the time; some of it was stuff I was augmenting with him. I was definitely playing with the violin bow. Brian had this guitar that had a volume pedal – he could get gunshots with it. There was a Mellotron there. He was moving forward with ideas."

Audio engineer Glyn Johns said that he and Jones did not get along personally but worked well on the project, Johns said: "Brian came to me and asked for help. He'd lost so much self-confidence by this time and really was in need of a hand. In a way I felt sorry for him. It wasn't that I didn't think he was capable of handling the project himself. But clearly he wanted help in the engineering. So I agreed. Brian worked very hard in his Courtfield flat on two little tape machines. He had all types of ideas which worked. He did it very well, and it came out amazingly. And we had a good time doing it. Brian was extremely together and confident while he was working on it. When it was finished he was both pleased and relieved. The rock 'n' roll bit which was written to fit the early murder scene was really good."

The musicians were:

- Brian Jones – sitar, organ, mellotron, recorder, banjo, harpsichord, autoharp, dulcimer, clarinet, harmonica
- Jimmy Page – guitars
- Nicky Hopkins – piano
- Kenny Jones – drums
- Glyn Johns – engineering
- Peter Gosling – backing vocals (on one song)
- Mike Leander – orchestra
