= The Dragon That Wasn't (Or Was He?) =

- Theatrical release poster
- Directed by: Harrie Geelen; Bjørn Frank Jensen; Bert Kroon
- Written by: Harrie Geelen; Bjørn Frank Jensen; Bert Kroon; Original characters: Marten Toonder
- Produced by: Rob Houwer
- Music by: Herman Schoonderwalt; Gildo del Mistro; Harrie Geelen (song lyrics)
- Production companies: Verenigde Nederlandsche Film Company; Topcraft
- Distributed by: Tuschinski Film Distribution
- Release date: 3 February 1983
- Running time: 84 minutes
- Country: Netherlands
- Language: Dutch
- Budget: $2,000,000 (estimated)

The Dragon That Wasn't (Or Was He?) (Dutch: Als je begrijpt wat ik bedoel, literally: If you know what I mean) is a 1983 Dutch film written and directed by Harrie Geelen, Bjørn Frank Jensen and Bert Kroon. Based on the comic strip Tom Puss, created by Marten Toonder, it was the first animated feature produced in the Netherlands.

The film was released on DVD in 2005.

== Plot ==
One stormy night, a servant dog, named Yost is reading a book saying that storms are caused by dragons. Starting to believe it to be true, he wakes up his employer, a bear, named Oliver B. Bear. When Ollie tries to convince Yost that dragons do not exist. Yost tries to convince Ollie otherwise by showing him a book he'd been reading during the storm. Ollie takes the book and reads a dragon, calling spell from it and the wind blows the curtains in their faces, and Ollie does not notice a dragon walking by the window. After the storm dies down, they see dragon tracks on the ground, and Yost goes searching for more evidence, visiting Ollie's next door neighbor, Kit Cat. He tells Kit Cat about what had happened with her determining that if she were a dragon after having laid an egg, she had leave on the back path behind the gardens. In the middle of the forest, Yost insisted they look around to find something to convince Ollie that dragons are real and find a spherical object. Not knowing what it is, they take it back to Ollie, who assumes that it is a beach ball.

Meanwhile, in a local bar, two gangsters are plotting a heist at a banquet to be held in Ollie's mansion. Both were hired as doormen.

The next morning, while Ollie is cleaning up for his party, the "beach ball" follows him, eventually carrying him outside to the fountain in front of his home. At this point, a dragon hatches out of the "beach ball" and he starts acting affectionate with Ollie, proving that Yost and Kit Cat were right, as Kit Cat points out that the little dragon believes Ollie to be his father, since Ollie was the first thing the little dragon saw. Ollie names the dragon Dexter, after his great grandfather. A rumor quickly spreads through town that Ollie laid an egg, after the local grocer brings an order to Marquis de Canteclaer explaining that he was late because he'd witnessed Ollie hatching an egg with a creature in it. The size and shape kept changing each time that the story gets retold from Mayor Dickerdack's office to the newspaper editor Mr. Tusker making its way to the entire town.

Later that day, Yost and a duck, named Mr. Waddle, he had hired to be waiter for Ollie's party attempt to give Dexter a bath, but as Kit Cat had read earlier, dragons hated baths; Dexter reacts by growing very large and becoming aggressive. When Yost tries to explain this to Ollie, he goes upstairs to investigate himself. By the time that he reaches the bathroom, Dexter has returned to normal size. Ollie interprets it to mean that Yost and Mr. Waddle overreacted, leading Ollie to still believe that Dexter is still a harmless child.

Before the banquet starts, Ollie puts Dexter to bed, but Dexter doesn't immediately go to sleep and starts gathering up toys and anything else he could fit in his pillow case presumably starting a hoard. During the banquet, the two gangsters are surreptitiously stealing the guests' belongings, while Dexter is slowly making his way towards the party attracted by the music and food. Meanwhile, Kit Cat is reading that dragons can be set off by sweet-tasting foods and shiny objects, and she realizes that Dexter might try to get into the party. She goes to the party and tries to get Ollie's attention, but he ignores her and opens the curtain to the dining room, revealing the monstrous Dexter, who assaults the guests collections and shaking out what the gangsters could not steal. Kit Cat tells Ollie he needed to be firm with Dexter. Ollie initially does not believe that the monstrous dragon was Dexter, until he scolds him and Dexter returns to normal size. Ollie, in obvious denial of Dexter obviously being a dragon, tries convincing his guests that Dexter is still a child but very different and special in his own right and that he was only going through growing pains. One of Ollie's guests, the local physician, tells Ollie to bring Dexter in for a checkup to help deal with the "growing pains".

Before he leaves for the hospital, the Police chief makes sure Dexter and Ollie go, and Kit Cat insists that she go with them to make sure nothing happens, with Ollie scolding her and insisting it was still nothing to worry over. When Ollie brings Dexter into the hospital the next morning, the two gangsters kidnap Dexter and have him rob the bank for them. When Ollie arrives to stop Dexter, the giant Dexter grabs him and runs into the hills with him.

Ollie wakes up the next morning, alone in a cave, finding himself to be alone until Kit Cat comes to try to convince Ollie to send Dexter back to his own kind, over the Misty Mountains but Ollie continuing to be stubborn, motivated Dexter to chasing Kit Cat away. Dexter is scolded for it afterward by Ollie who suggests to have breakfast. Dexter opens his bag and dumps out some turnips he dug up, but since Ollie does not like the idea of eating them, Dexter leaves. After wandering through the hills for a few minutes trying to find Dexter, Ollie starts remembering how good he had him back home and eventually comes across the police, who arrest him for his presumed role in the bank robbery. Dexter returns apparently after having raided the grocer's store for food he knew Ollie liked, but finds Ollie gone and starts crying. After Mayor Dickerdack makes a deal with Ollie to capture Dexter and hand him over to the circus, under the premise that it's for Dexter's own good, Ollie cooperates. As Dexter breaks into the jail trying to save Ollie, Ollie tells Dexter he cannot be the little dragon's father anymore which saddens Dexter causing him to shrink down to the size he was when he hatched, leaving the jail in tears. Ollie's name is cleared and he is released for helping to "capture the vicious dragon", and he later watches as a commercial for the circus with the gangsters hosting comes on TV.

Yost leaves for the opening premier of the circus leaving Kit Cat to watch it over the TV and her shouting at Ollie to be quiet, only to later see Ollie unpacking a blunderbuss that he brings with him going to the circus. At the start of the show Kit Cat can be seen sneaking to the back of the tent opening the cage Dexter was kept in trying to help him escape, only to find Dexter was too sad and depressed to want to escape. Later one of the two gangsters and Mr. Waddles show up to get Dexter into the show pushing, shoving and pulling him into the center ring with Bull, the lead gangster, making himself the ringmaster trying to provoke him by whipping the ground in front of him. Ollie arrives at the circus and stops the act, bringing up Dexter's spirits after seeing him. Ollie stirs up some trouble by firing his blunderbuss into the air scaring the crowd. This causes Dexter to grow and become aggressive again. The resulting chaos destroys the circus with the gangsters trying to get away with all the money, but Dexter stops them first by picking them up, only to have Ollie tell him to put the money box down. This causes some of the money they'd had to fly away on a breeze. Dexter sees it and burns it leaving the gangsters with nothing. He picks up Ollie and leaves for the hills again only unlike before Ollie gives a warmer farewell telling Dexter he is now a big boy and has to return to his Dragon kind over the mountains. Dexter hears a call from another dragon and climbs the hills returning it, waving goodbye to Ollie.

At the end of the film, Ollie admits his faults, misjudgments and stubbornness by admitting that dragons were in fact real and he had learned this from the book Yost had in the beginning, which Yost ironically burns up. With Mayor Dickerdack, Mr. Tusker and other friends at the table, Ollie toasts to Dexter and the dragons, after which we hear a dragon call scaring Yost, thinking another one was coming, but Ollie believed it was Dexter saying another goodbye to them all from the mountain, Confident that he'd found his family. The film ends with Mr. Waddles waddling up to the mountain with a net and cage, apparently hoping to catch a dragon of his own.

== Cast ==
Character		Original	English
Original	English	Original	English
Oliver B. Bommel	Oliver B. Bear	Fred Benavente	Gregg Berger
Tom Puss	Kit Cat	Trudy Libosan	Mona Marshall
Joost	Yost	Luc Lutz	John Hostetter
Mayor Dickerdack		Lo van Hensbergen	Unknown
Commissioner Bulle Bas	Chief Snooper	Joan Remmelts	Jeff Winkless
Bul Super		André van den Heuvel	Jeff Winkless
Zielknijper	Doctor Lockjaw	Ger Smit	Dave Mallow
Markies de Canteclaer		Ger Smit	Jeff Winkless
Nieuwslezer	Newscaster	Fred Emmer	Dave Mallow
Grootgrut	Ram Shop Owner	Paul Haenen	John Hostetter
O. Fanth Mzn	Mr. Tusker	Will Van Selst	Dave Mallow
Neighbor Doddeltje	Miss Fluff	Tonny Huurdeman	Mona Marshall
Wammes Waggel	Mr. Waddle	Harrie Geelen	John Hostetter
Brigadier Snuf	Officer Fuzznose	Sacco van der Made	John Hostetter
Unknown	Mrs. Tusker	Unknown	Mona Marshall

- Cees Linnebank - Hieper
- Arnold Gelderman - Journalist Argus
- Tonny Huurdeman - Miss Bass
- Maja Bouma - Head nurse
- Elly Van Stekelenburg - Mrs. Dickerdack

== Production ==
In 1942–1944, Marten Toonder partnered with Joop Geesink to produce animated shorts based on Tom Puss for Nederlandse Spoorwegen and Philips. He also collaborated with Degeto Film to produce an adaptation of the first Tom Puss story Het geheim van de blauwe aarde (1941), Tom Puss und das Geheimnis der Grotte, which was never completed. In 1947–1950, his studio had opened an animation department, which produced Tom Puss shorts commissioned by Philips, including The Haunted Castle, The Magic Music, In Dreamland, and Tom Puss and The Legend of Loch Ness.

In the summer of 1979, producer Rob Houwer wrote a letter to Toonder, who was residing in Ireland, about making an animated film. Houwer had a love of Disney, had been reading and studying the Tom Puss stories, such as Het land van de blikken mannen (1942), and wanted to take a break from working with actors. Production began in 1980 and ended in 1982, with Houwer and Toonder assuming artistic leadership. The film's screenplay was adapted from the Tom Puss stories De zwelbast (1957) and Het monster-ei (1942) by Bjørn Frank Jensen, Bert Kroon and director Harrie Geelen. Animator Børge Ring and comic artist Jaap Lamberton participated in the film's production. The backgrounds were painted by Frits Godhelp and Ben van Voorn.

Toonder was not satisfied with the film, feeling that it focused too much on slapstick.

== See also ==
- List of animated feature films
