= Go for It, Baby =

1968 film

- Directed by: May Spils
- Written by: Werner Enke; Rüdiger Leberecht; May Spils
- Produced by: Peter Schamoni
- Starring: Werner Enke; Uschi Glas; Henry van Lyck
- Cinematography: Klaus König
- Edited by: Ulrike Froehner; Heidi Genée; May Spils
- Music by: Kristian Schultze
- Production company: Peter Schamoni Film
- Distributed by: Alpha Films
- Release date: 4 January 1968
- Running time: 80 minutes
- Country: West Germany
- Language: German

Go for It, Baby (German: Zur Sache, Schätzchen) is a 1968 West German comedy film directed by May Spils and starring Werner Enke, Uschi Glas and Henry van Lyck. It was part of the wave of New German Cinema films. The film won two German Film Awards. Location shooting took place in Munich.

== Cast ==
- Werner Enke as Martin
- Uschi Glas as Barbara
- Henry van Lyck as Henry van Busch
- Rainer Basedow as Wachhabender im Polizeirevier
- Inge Marschall as Anita
- Helmut Brasch as Viktor Block
- Joachim Schneider as Wachtmeister
- Fritz Schuster as Bettler
- Johannes Buzalski as Spanner
- Horst Pasderski as Filmproduzent
- Ursula Bode
- Edith Volkmann as Hausmeisterin
- Martin Lüttge as Dichter im Fahrstuhl
- Erwin Dietzel as Zoo-Wärter
- Li Bonk as Blocks Sekretärin
- Barbara Schütz as Anitas Freundin
- Günter Strigel as Polizist 2
- Peter Tambosi as Polizist 1

== Reception ==
The film was the highest-grossing in Switzerland in the second half of 1968 as well as the highest-grossing German film in Germany of the year 1968.

== Bibliography ==
- Hake, Sabine. German National Cinema. Routledge, 2013.
