= Zur Freiheit =

Zur Freiheit is a German television series.

== See also ==
- List of German television series
