= Zeit genug =

German television series

- Country of origin: Germany

Zeit genug is a German television series. It translates to 'Plenty of Time' in English.
