= Alfred Kubin =

Austrian illustrator and writer (1877–1959)

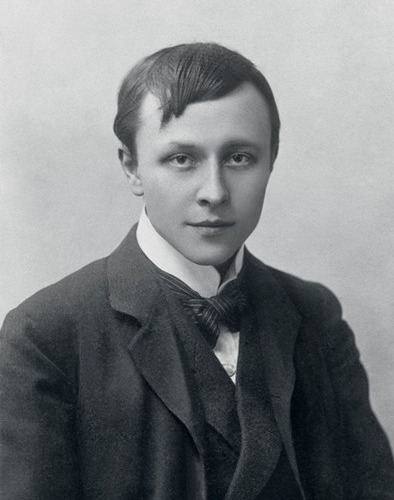
- Kubin in 1898
- Born: Alfred Leopold Isidor Kubin; 10 April 1877; Litoměřice, Kingdom of Bohemia, Austria-Hungary
- Died: 20 August 1959 (aged 82); Zwickledt near Wernstein am Inn, Austria
- Education: Munich Academy
- Known for: Painting
- Movement: Symbolism, Expressionism

Alfred Leopold Isidor Kubin (10 April 1877 – 20 August 1959) was an Austrian artist, printmaker, illustrator, and writer of a single novel, The Other Side. Kubin is considered an important exponent of Symbolism and Expressionism.

== Biography ==
Kubin was born in Bohemia in the town of Leitmeritz in the Austro-Hungarian Empire (now Litoměřice). From 1892 to 1896, he was apprenticed to the landscape photographer Alois Beer, although he learned little. In 1896, he attempted suicide on his mother's grave, and his short stint in the Austrian army the following year ended with a nervous breakdown.

In 1898, Kubin began a period of artistic study at a private academy run by the painter Ludwig Schmitt-Reutte, before enrolling at the Munich Academy in 1899, without finishing his studies there. In Munich, Kubin discovered the works of Odilon Redon, Edvard Munch, James Ensor, Henry de Groux, and Félicien Rops. He was profoundly affected by the prints of Max Klinger, and later recounted: "Here a new art was thrown open to me, which offered free play for the imaginative expression of every conceivable world of feeling. Before putting the engravings away I swore that I would dedicate my life to the creation of similar works". The aquatint technique used by Klinger and Goya influenced the style of his works of this period, which are mainly ink and wash drawings of fantastical, often macabre subjects.

In 1902, Kubin exhibited at the prestigious Cassirer Gallery in Berlin. Soon after, having met the publisher Hans von Weber in Munich in 1901, in 1903 the Hans von Weber Portfolio reproduced 15 of Kubin's works on paper as prints, which allowed a wider distribution of his work, and established his fame. According to one contemporary critic, Kubin's work occupied "the darkroom of the modern soul".

Kubin produced a small number of oil paintings in the years between 1902 and 1910, but thereafter his output consisted of pen and ink drawings, watercolors, and lithographs. In 1911, he became associated with the Blaue Reiter group, and exhibited with them in the Galerie Der Sturm in Berlin in 1913. After that time, he lost contact with the artistic avant-garde.

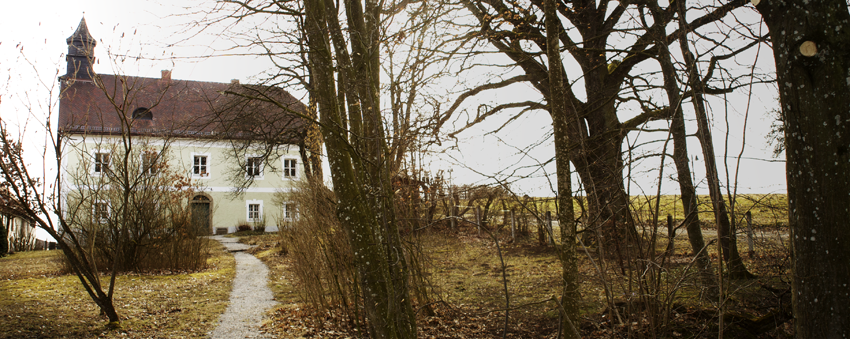
Manor-House Zwickledt (Upper Austria): last residence of Alfred Kubin.

Kubin is considered an important representative of Symbolism and Expressionism and is noted for dark, spectral, symbolic fantasies, often assembled into thematic series of drawings. Like Oskar Kokoschka and Albert Paris Gütersloh, Kubin had both artistic and literary talent. He illustrated works of Edgar Allan Poe, E. T. A. Hoffmann, and Fyodor Dostoevsky, among others. Kubin also illustrated the German fantasy magazine Der Orchideengarten.

From 1906 until his death, he lived a withdrawn life in a Manor-House on a 12th-century estate in Zwickledt, Upper Austria. In 1938, at the Anschluss of Austria by Nazi Germany, his work was declared entartete Kunst or "degenerate art", but he managed to continue working during World War II.

== Themes ==
Kubin’s work is notable for its dark, imaginative vision, populated by motifs of decay, illness, nightmares, and fantastical creatures. Deeply influenced by dreams and the emerging study of the unconscious, particularly The Interpretation of Dreams by Sigmund Freud, Kubin produced works exploring psychological states, often working in intense bursts reportedly linked to fevers and hallucinations.

A prominent theme in his work is the representation of the female body and sexuality. Women are frequently depicted as threatening figures, often portrayed as seductive, dominant, or predatory, presenting female sexuality as a danger.

== The Other Side ==
Kubin's only novel was The Other Side (German: Die andere Seite) (1909), a fantastic novel set in an oppressive imaginary land. The novel evokes absurdity and claustrophobia. The illustrations for the book were originally intended for The Golem by Gustav Meyrink, but as that book was delayed, Kubin instead worked his illustrations into his own novel.

The Other Side influenced a number of Austrian and German writers, notably Ernst Jünger, Thomas Mann, Franz Kafka, Joseph Roth, Hermann Kasack and Christoph Ransmayr. It has achieved cult status, receiving praise from Jeff VanderMeer and other writers.

== Drawings sold under duress ==
In 2016, the Städtische Galerie im Lenbachhaus Munich restituted, to the heirs of Max and Hertha Morgenstern, 16 drawings by Kubin which had been sold under duress in Vienna in July 1938 as a result of Nazi persecution of Jews following Austria's Anschluss with Nazi Germany. Lenbachhaus had acquired them from Kurt Otte, a Kubin collector in Hamburg in 1971.

The German Lost Art Foundation lists 24 artworks by Kubin in its database, many of which are from the Found-Object Reports from the Staatliche Kunstsammlungen Dresden Kupferstichkabinett in Dresden which launched Nazi-era provenance research in 2008.

== Honours and awards ==
- City of Vienna Prize for Visual Arts (1950)
- Grand Austrian State Prize for Visual Art (1951)
- Austrian Medal for Science and Art (1957)
- Gustav Klimt badge as an honorary member of the Vienna Secession

== Collections ==
- Kubin's Dance of Death and Other Drawings (1973) (art collection) (ISBN 9780486228846)
- The Life and Art of Alfred Kubin (2017) (autobiography) (ISBN 9780486815305)

== Gallery ==
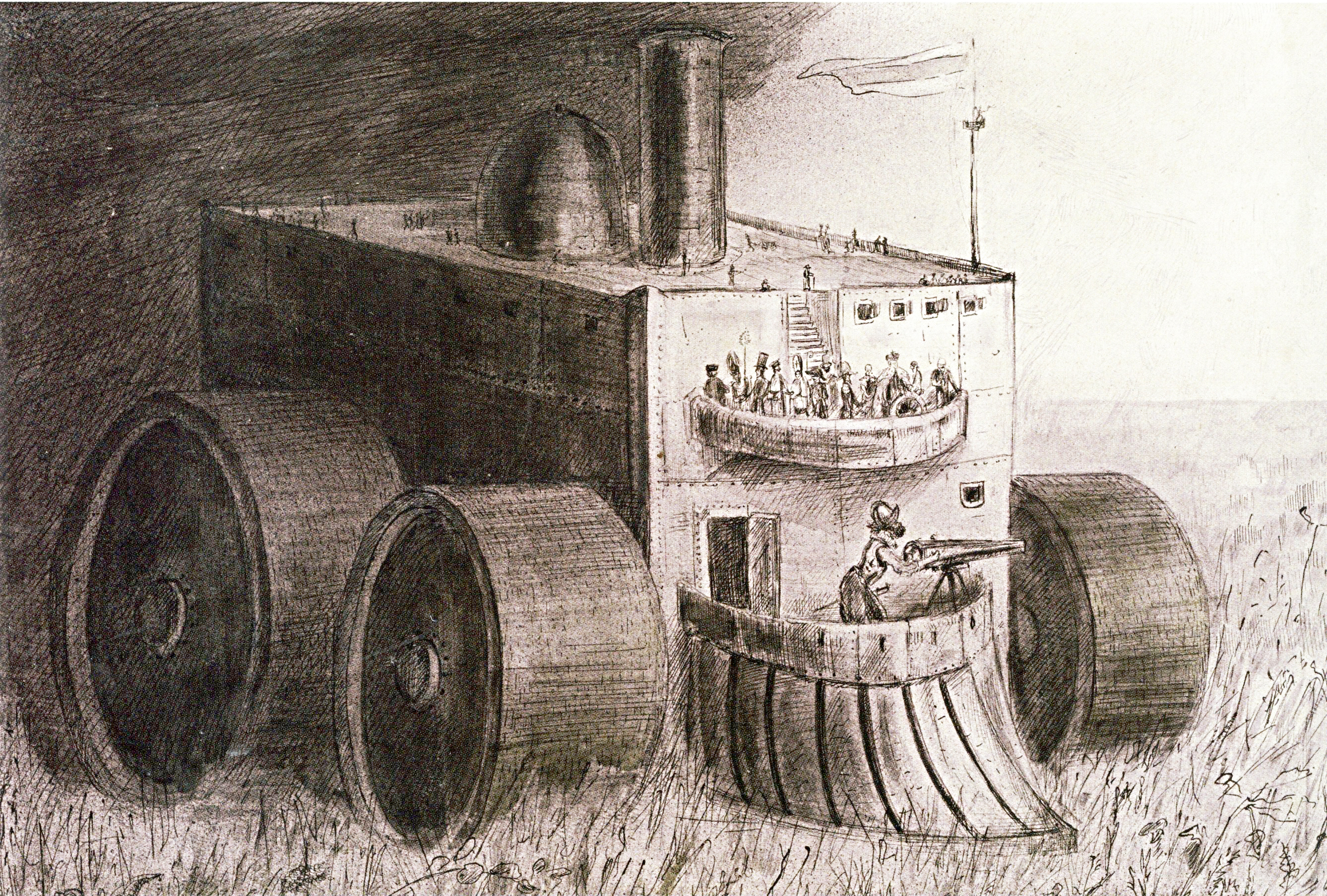
The State (1899–1900)

Dolmen (c. 1900–1902); Indian ink, wash, spray paint, and white body color; Albertina, Vienna

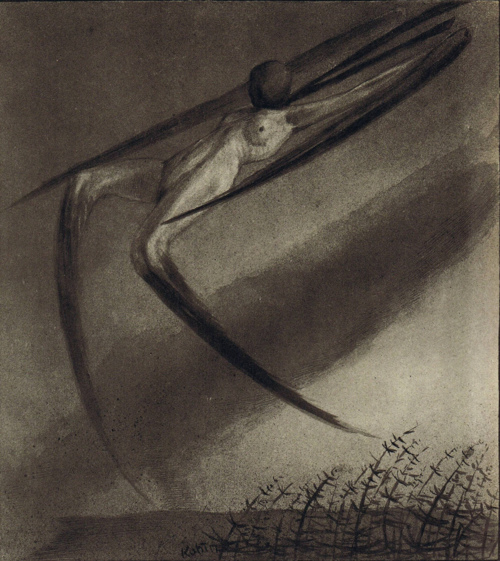
A Dream Visits Us Every Night (1900)

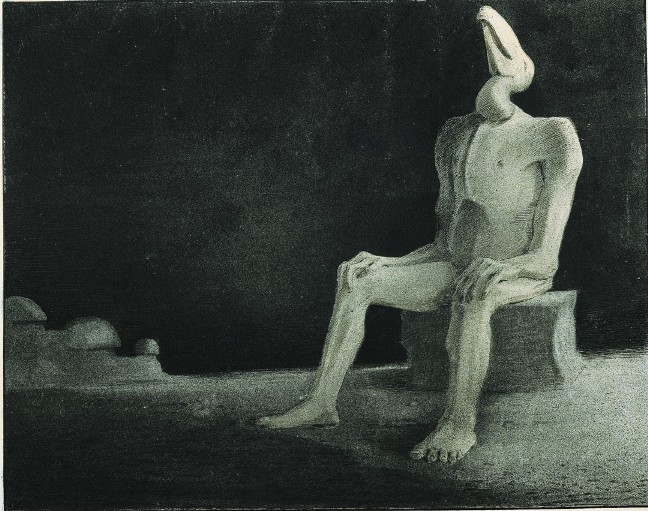
The Past Forgotten Swallowed (1901)

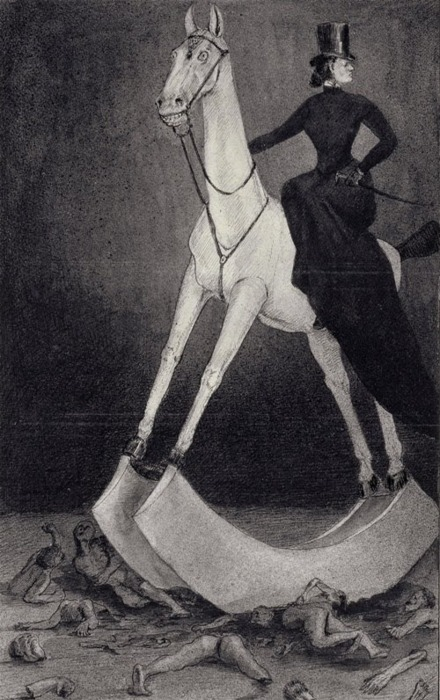
The Lady on the Horse (1901); pen, ink, wash and spray

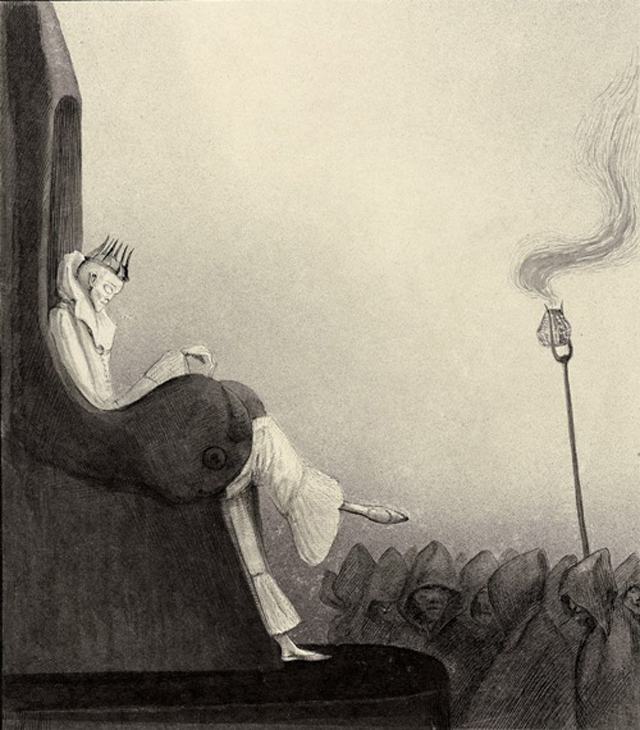
The Last King (1902)

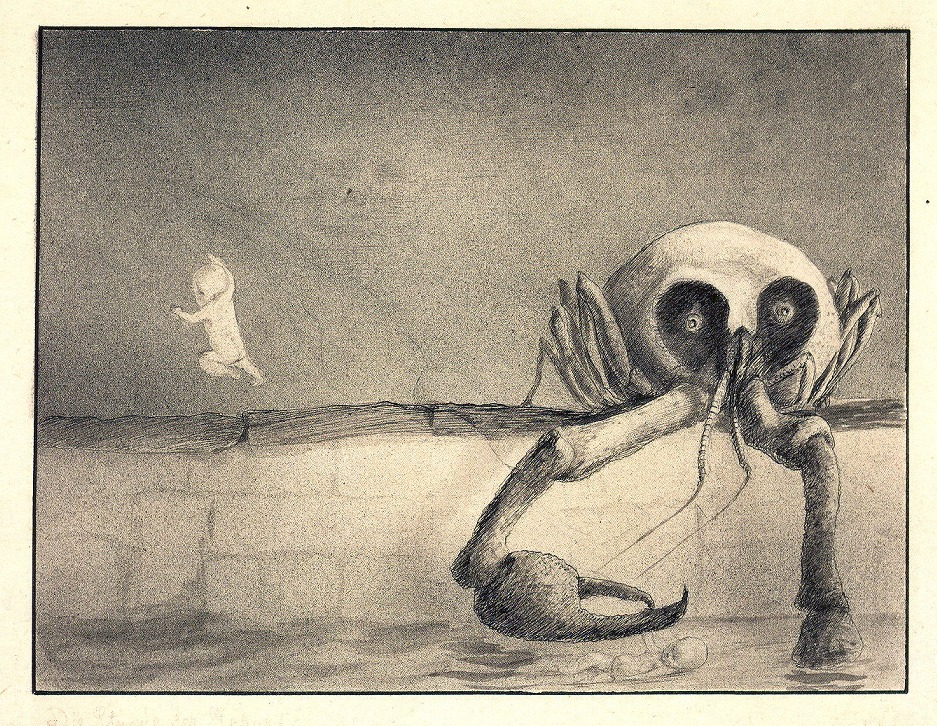
The Moment of Birth (1902)

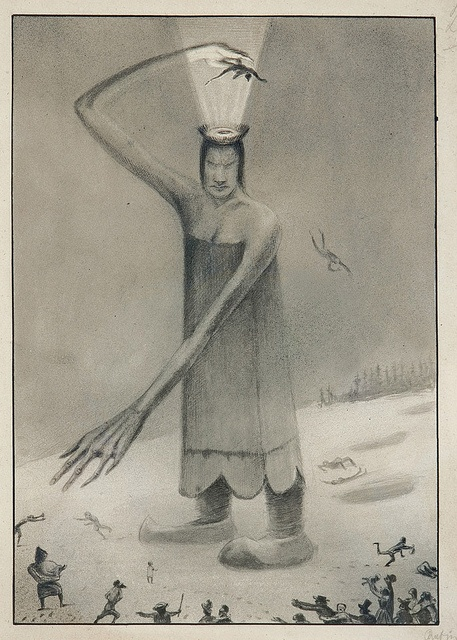
Siberian Fairy Tale (1902)

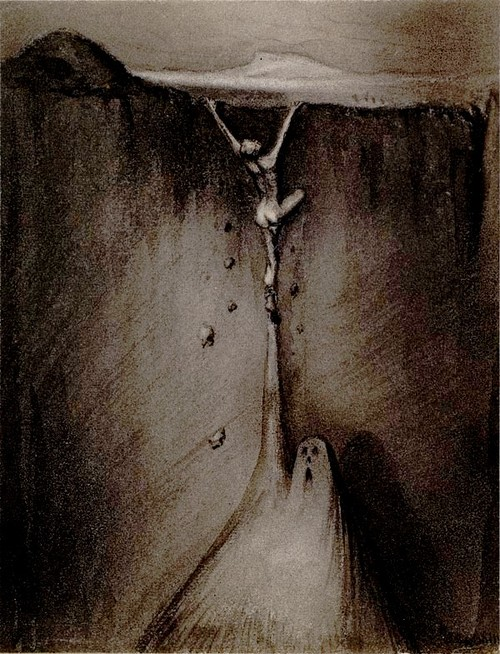
Angst (1903)

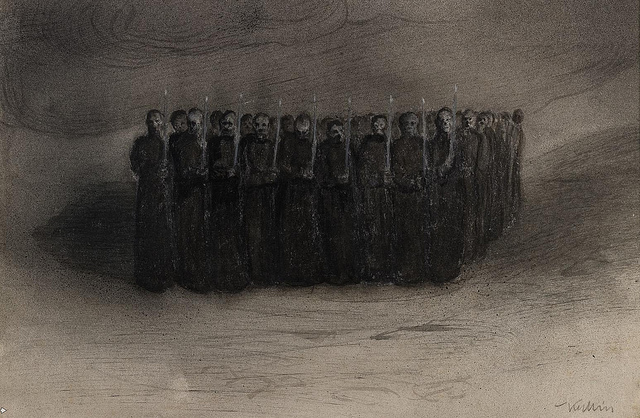
Black Mass (1905)

== See also ==
- List of Austrian artists and architects
- List of Austrians
