= Marran Gosov =

Bulgarian film director

- Born: 3 October 1933; Sofia, Bulgaria
- Died: 12 January 2021 (aged 87); Polkovnik Serafimovo, Bulgaria
- Other name: Tzvetan Marangosoff
- Occupations: Director, screenwriter, producer, composer
- Years active: 1963-1994 (film & TV)

Marran Gosov (1933–2021) was a Bulgarian filmmaker who settled and worked in West Germany. Born in Sofia to a German mother and Bulgarian artist, he emigrated to German in 1960. He produced a number of shorts and feature films as well as working in West German television. He is associated with New German Cinema via the New Munich Group.

== Selected filmography ==
- Angel Baby (1968)
- Sugar Bread and Whip (1968)
- 24 Hour Lover (1968)
- That Guy Loves Me, Am I Supposed to Believe That? (1969)

== Bibliography ==
- Gerhardt, Christina & Abel, Marco. Celluloid Revolt: German Screen Cultures and the Long 1968. Camden House, 2019.
- Abel, Marco & Fisher, Jaimey (ed.) New German Cinema and Its Global Contexts: A Transnational Art Cinema. Wayne State University Press, 2025.
- Rother, Rainer (ed.) German Film: From the Archives of the Deutsche Kinemathek. Hatje Cantz Verlag, 2024.
