= Romy: Anatomy of a Face =

1967 film

- Screenplay by: Hans-Jürgen Syberberg
- Directed by: Hans-Jürgen Syberberg
- Starring: Romy Schneider
- Country of origin: West Germany
- Original language: German

Production
- Producer: Rob Houwer
- Cinematography: Kurt Lorenz; Klaus König
- Editors: Barbara Mondry; Michaela Berchtold
- Running time: 60 minutes
- Production company: Houwer-Film

Original release
- Release: 21 January 1967

Romy: Anatomy of a Face (German: Romy. Porträt eines Gesichts) is a 1967 West German documentary film about the actress Romy Schneider. Directed by Hans-Jürgen Syberberg, the film was shot at the ski resort of Kitzbühel during three days in February 1966. It was made for television.

The film director Syberberg portrays the aspiring film actress Romy Schneider while skiing on the Kitzbüheler Horn, walking around Kaps Castle and talking about her career in detail by the fireplace: Romy Schneider expresses her great desire to play theater in Germany and Austria, but at the same time confesses her stage fright. She talks about the beginning of her career with her first film role in 1953 at the side of her mother Magda Schneider, as well as about the great success of the "Sissi films". She talks about her everyday life when she was not filming in Paris, the “star system” in the USA and the shooting of the film The Trial (1962) with director Orson Welles as well as about her encounter with Coco Chanel in 1962.

Syberberg shows an amazingly approachable and forthcoming Romy Schneider, with all the magic of her 27-year-old physical beauty and her softly modulated voice. At the same time you can also see the actress's great sensitivity, her nervousness and her self-doubt. This allows deep insight into Romy Schneider's personality. The film is underlaid with music from the 1960s (Oscar Peterson's “Tangerine”, the chanson “Que c'est triste Venise” by Charles Aznavour and the song “Bee-Bom” by Sammy Davis Jr.) and vividly conveys the leisure life of Romy Schneider.
