= Johannes Schaaf =

German film and stage director (1933-2019)

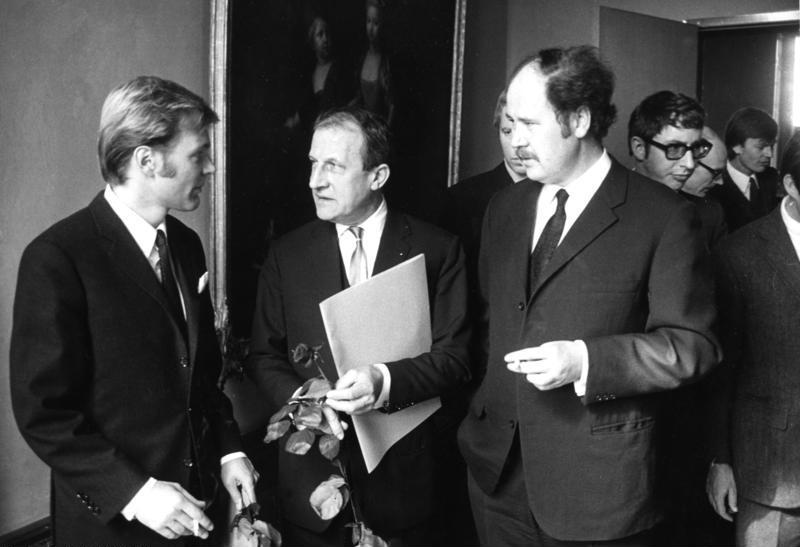
- Helmut Griem, Hans Lietzau, and Johannes Schaaf
- Born: 7 April 1933; Stuttgart, Nazi Germany
- Died: 1 November 2019 (aged 86)
- Occupations: Film director, opera director and producer, stage director, actor
- Years active: 1960 – present

Johannes Schaaf (7 April 1933 – 1 November 2019) was a German film, theatre and opera director and actor. Several of his films have been internationally recognized. His focus shifted to opera in the 1980s and he worked with many of the leading international opera houses within Europe, and was invited to direct at several renowned opera houses in the United States and Asia.

== Biography ==
He initially studied medicine at the Universities of Tübingen and Berlin, but moved into theatre during the 1950s, during which he worked at the Staatstheater Stuttgart as actor and assistant stage director. 1958 he started directing himself at the Theater Ulm. During the 1960s, he became acclaimed through multiple movie and TV productions. His film Trotta was nominated for the Palme d'Or at the 1972 Cannes Film Festival. He was head of the jury at the 19th Berlin International Film Festival. His movie Tattoo was one of the first films to address the generational tensions during the early years of Germany's "student revolution".

In the 1980s, he turned more and more towards theatre and opera. His last movie was Momo in 1986. He directed plays at the Vienna Burgtheater, the Schiller Theater in Berlin, the Residenztheater in Munich and the Salzburg Festival (Leonce and Lena, Nathan the Wise, La Folle Journée by Beaumarchais). He directed opera at the Salzburg Festival: Capriccio, The Magic Flute and Die Entführung aus dem Serail, working with conductor Georg Solti. At the Royal Opera House Covent Garden in London he directed Mozart's Idomeneo, The Marriage of Figaro (1987), Così fan tutte (1989), and Don Giovanni. With conductor Nikolaus Harnoncourt he directed Idomeneo (1987) and Così fan tutte (1989) at the Vienna State Opera. He worked at the Bavarian State Opera and De Nederlandse Opera, as well as with the Staatstheater Stuttgart: Lady Macbeth von Mzensk, Wozzeck, Rigoletto, Simon Boccanegra, Hansel and Gretel, Falstaff and The Queen of Spades.

His production of Boris Godunov at the Bavarian State Opera was also shown at the grand opening of the New Opera house in Tel Aviv. He directed Othello in Stockholm, Fidelio, Die Fledermaus, Eugene Onegin and King Roger by Karol Szymanowski in Amsterdam. The Zurich Opera was showplace to his production of Verdi's Aida as well as a highly regarded new version of Weber's Oberon.

Schaaf lived and worked for many years of his early career with actress Rosemarie Fendel; since 1984 he is married to opera singer Stella Kleindienst.

== Selected filmography ==
=== Director ===
- 1963: Ein ungebetener Gast (TV)
- 1964: Hotel Iphigenie (TV)
- 1965: Im Schatten einer Großstadt (TV)
- 1965: Die Gegenprobe (TV)
- 1966: Große Liebe (TV)
- 1965: Der Mann aus dem Bootshaus (TV)
- 1967: Tattoo
- 1971: Trotta
- 1973: Dream City
- 1975: Der Kommissar – "Der Mord an Dr. Winter" (TV)
- 1986: Momo

=== Actor ===
- 1960: Aufruhr (TV)
- 1960: Terror in der Waage (TV)
- 1961: Die Nashörner (TV)
- 1961: Zwischen den Zügen (TV), as Johnny
- 1961: Unsere kleine Stadt (TV)
- 1962: Die Feuertreppe (TV), as Eddie
- 1967: Next Year, Same Time, as Spezie
- 1970: First Love, as Nirmatsky
- 1970: Bali, as Bradford
- 1971: Das falsche Gewicht, as Gendarm Slama
- 1971: Jaider, der einsame Jäger
- 1973: Im Reservat (TV)
- 1975: Der Kommissar – "Sturz aus großer Höhe" (TV), as Hans Werner Schäfer
- 1975: Der Kommissar – "Der Held des Tages" (TV), as Robert Stimmel
- 1975: John Glückstadt
- 1983: Fear of Falling, as Ing. Hübner
