= International response to the MeToo movement =

List of responses to the #MeToo movement

The MeToo movement, an effort to publicize and criticize sexual abuse and harassment, was founded in 2006 by Tarana Burke, and spread virally on social media following the exposure of numerous sexual-abuse allegations against film producer Harvey Weinstein in October 2017. Since then, the #MeToo hashtag has trended in at least 85 countries.

== Afghanistan ==
The #MeToo hashtag initially spread in Afghanistan where it is estimated about 90% of women experience sexual harassment in public, at school, or at work, but was quickly silenced when those who shared their stories started fearing for their life. Less than 1% of police officers or military members are women, and sexual assault is often ignored by law enforcement and the military. Rape threats and other types of harassment are common on Facebook and other social media in Afghanistan. Sharing stories of sexual abuse against higher-ranking men is especially dangerous for women in the country, and may result in the killing of the victim or her family members. Some women are also punished or killed by their own family for speaking out, to redeem their "honor" after being tarnished by rape. Despite the risks, some notable people such as Sarienews journalist Maryam Mehtar, and presidential advisor Shaharzad Akbar have shared their own #MeToo stories on social media. Mehtar experienced extreme abuse and several death threats for sharing her story about being sexually harassed in public daily, and was publicly called a "whore" in an interview with The New York Times by Afghan writer Jalil Junbish. He also called the NYT reporter a whore in the same interview. He later denied making the comments. Other women only share their first name or a fake name, and typically describe the story without naming the perpetrator to avoid reprisal. Sexual harassment was first defined in Afghanistan in 2016, though there has been little effort made to enforce laws against it. Rod Nordland and Fatima Faizi of The New York Times reported that a colonel in the Afghan Air Force was secretly and clearly videotaped sexually assaulting a subordinate in November 2017, and the video quickly went viral, but despite an alleged investigation, the colonel has not been formally accused of misconduct. The Ministries of Interior and Communications set up a phone hotline for women to call to report sexual misconduct from law enforcement officials, but a call to the line revealed the hotline will offer advice only about phone harassment, and stated if a person harasses you in person, to "slap them".

== Australia ==
In October 2017, reporter and journalist Tracey Spicer announced on Twitter that she was launching an investigation into reports of sexual harassment by powerful Australian men in the media in the wake of the Harvey Weinstein sexual abuse allegations and the rise in public awareness of the #MeToo movement. Earlier that same year, Spicer had released a memoir, The Good Girl Stripped Bare, where she wrote about her own experiences of sexual harassment in the work place. Spicer later reported that she had received responses from 470 people about people in the industry, including Australian television presenter and producer Don Burke. The extent of the claims against Burke were published by the Australian Broadcasting Corporation (ABC) and The Sydney Morning Herald in a joint investigative piece on November 26, 2017, where it was reported that "One name kept recurring – Don Burke." Spicer, along with Kate McClymont, Lorna Knowles and Alison Branley, won the 2018 Walkley Awards in the print/text journalism and Television/Video Current Affairs Short (less than 20 minutes) categories for their investigation and on Australia Day in 2018, Spicer was appointed as a Member of the Order of Australia "for significant service to the broadcast media as a journalist and television presenter, and as an ambassador for social welfare and charitable groups". Later that same year, Spicer and Melinda Schneider launched NOW Australia, a campaign aimed at helping connect people with legal support and counselling.

Since then the #MeToo movement has now expanded beyond Australian media and the Australian Human Rights Commission has launched an independent search into workplace sexual harassment that is the first of its kind in the world.

It has been hypothesised by The Age that Australia's strict defamation laws make it difficult for more victims to come forward. The Daily Telegraph reported an accusation against Geoffrey Rush. He then successfully sued the newspaper for defamation; this may have a chilling effect on the #MeToo movement due to the lack of protection for freedom of speech. Yael Stone separately described sexual misconduct by Rush.

Tarana Burke and Tracey Spicer won the 2019 Sydney Peace Prize for their role in the #MeToo movement. The award was presented on November 14, 2019.

In February 2021, four women accused a former parliament staffer of rape, including Brittany Higgins who mentioned that she was raped in the office of the then-defence industry minister Linda Reynolds inside Parliament House in March 2019. Days after Higgins came forward, Attorney-General Christian Porter gave a media statement about a 1988 rape allegation made against him by a woman who committed suicide in 2020.

== Austria ==
Austrian director Michael Haneke called the #MeToo movement "a new puritanism coloured by a hatred of men" and a "witch hunt" that "should be left in the Middle Ages".

In 2019, the umbrella organization of Austrian filmmakers along with the VdFS, the VAM and the BMKÖS launched "#we_do!"", a contact point "against discrimination and unequal treatment, abuse of power, sexual assault and violations in labor law" for everyone working in the Austrian film and television industry.

On June 18, 2022, Austrian director Katharina Mückstein initiated a debate by sharing on her Instagram account her experiences with sexism and sexual harassment in the film industry since she was 19, such as when a lighting technician insulted her body every day on a film set and then said that he wanted to fuck her, and when she got the funding approval for her first major film, two established male colleagues tried to intervene with the funding agency so that she would not get the money, since they believed that she only got the funding because she is a woman. She also shared an Instagram Story that read: "Tonight a perpetrator will stand on the stage and will be applauded. And there is nothing we can do to counter that. It's devastating. I wish all those affected good nerves. #MeToo didn't even start in Austria". No name was given, but the only event of that kind taking place in Austria that night was the premiere of Corsage in Vienna, which led to speculation that Mückstein was referring to someone who worked in that film. Mückstein later said that she could not name the man for legal reasons.

Mückstein's Instagram posts inspired several women to share their own experiences with sexual harassment, sexism, racism, homophobia and abuses of power in the Austrian film and theatre community, which Mückstein then shared anonymously on her Instagram account, which generated a lot of debates, media attention and sparked a new wave of the #MeToo Movement in Austria. When Corsage's director, Marie Kreutzer, was asked about it, she told Austrian magazine Profil on 2 July 2022 that she learned about the rumors about one of the actors from Corsage "a long time ago", when the project was already underway, but as long as there are only rumors and no court-confirmed evidence, she will never remove or dismiss a staff member from the stage based on rumors, and if there are neither concrete allegations nor a procedure against someone, she would act as a judge if she reacted with consequences. "There were certainly reports about this man, but they only came from people who were neither affected themselves nor had anything to testify directly. One should stick to the facts, because passing on rumors can seriously damage people; I appreciate Katharina Mückstein extremely for her attitude and her commitment to film politics, we are definitely on the same side. But I would definitely have chosen a different path," she said.

Mückstein's proposal to give a speech on the #MeToo debate on the stage of the Austrian Film Awards ceremony at the end of June 2022 was rejected by the Austrian Film Academy, which choose to release a statement on the matter on their official website instead.

During her acceptance speech for Best Supporting Actress at the Austrian Film Awards on June 30, 2022, German actress Luna Jordan said; "I'm only 20 years old and I'm a frequent victim of sexual abuse on film sets and in the theater. It is important to stand together here. Let's break the silence together," Jordan urged those in attendance, earning a standing ovation.

On September 2, 2022, German newspaper Der Spiegel reported that Austrian filmmaker Ulrich Seidl has been accused of child exploitation and that children were exposed to violence and nudity on the set of his 2022 film Sparta. Seidl has denied the allegations. The Filmfest Hamburg gave up on awarding Seidl with the Douglas Sirk Prize, and the Toronto Film Festival withdrew Sparta from its program due to the allegations.

On September 5, 2022, two Austrian independent organisations launched VERA, a trust center against abuse of power, harassment and violence in art, culture and sport. It is run by the Vertrauensstelle for the field of the arts and culture, and the 100% Sport for the sports sector.

On January 13, 2023, it was reported that actor Florian Teichtmeister has been charged with possession of child pornography. In the middle of Summer 2021, Teichtmeister's girlfriend at the time discovered a pornographic image of a child on his mobile phone and informed the police. During a search of Teichtmeister's apartment, police found around 58,000 files with pornographic depictions of minors in a total of 22 data carriers such as laptops, desktops, mobile phones, USB sticks and memory cards collected between February 2008 and August 2021. The investigators found no evidence that Teichtmeister had passed on data, but he is said to have taken photos of minors himself at film locations and subsequently arranged them into collages with speech bubbles with pornographic content. According to Teichtmeister's lawyer, Michael Rami, his client "fully confesses" and would plead guilty in the forthcoming trial, scheduled to begin on February 8, 2023, at the Vienna Criminal Court. Teichtmeister faced up to two years in prison. Teichtmeister's lawyer said that he is accused of a "purely digital crime", meaning that he has not committed any criminal acts against people. Following the reports, Austrian public broadcaster ORF stated that it will refrain from producing and broadcasting works with Teichtmeister with immediate effect, and The Burgtheater dismissed him from their ensemble without notice. The cinema chain Cineplexx also reacted by removing the film Corsage (in which Teichtmeister portrayed Emperor Franz Joseph I of Austria) from its theaters in Austria. On January 14, 2023, the Federal Ministry for Art, Culture, Public Service and Sport, Andrea Mayer, announced a detailed examination of the case and commissioned the Bundestheater-Holding to create a comprehensive chronology of the information flows in the group to ensure that all levels were acted correctly and with the necessary care. The producers of Corsage, Johanna Scherz and Alexander Glehr stated; "Today we learned of the charges against Florian Teichtmeister for the first time and as film producers and parents we are deeply shocked. Over the weekend we will decide together with the director of the film, Marie Kreutzer, what this means for the film and we will inform you in good time." On January 15, 2023, Kreutzer released a statement saying that she was "sad and angry that a feminist film that more than 300 people from all over Europe worked on for years may be tarnished and damaged by the horrific actions of one person". Kreutzer said she was informed of the rumors about Teichtmeister in Autumn 2021, after filming for Corsage had wrapped, and when the actor was inquired about these rumors, he "convincingly assured us (and others) of their falsity," she said.

Rumors about Teichtmeister have been circulating in the Austrian press since September 2021, when daily newspaper Der Standard published an article reporting that there was talk of a "successful local theater and film actor who is said to be hoarding child pornographic material". The actor's ex-partner reported him, and he was said to have physically attacked and verbally threatened her during their relationship. No one was named at the time, but insiders quickly found out that it was Teichtmeister, according to Austrian magazine Profil, which also stated that Katharina Mückstein's Instagram post on June 18, 2022, was meant for a different actor, and Mückstein herself later stated that she was not talking about Teichtmeister. The Burgtheater director Martin Kušej said that Teichtmeister had been identified internally as the person concerned in the rumors in 2021, but he "credibly denied" all of the allegations when he was confronted by the management and described the accusations as an act of revenge by his ex-partner. However, according to his lawyer, Teichmeister is said to have confessed from the start and cooperated with the authorities. In October 2021, Dieter Pochlatko, producer of the film Serviam, was informed by the lawyer of the parents of an underage actress about a photo and was asked to arrange that Teichtmeister no longer approached that actress. On 5 September 2023, Teichtmeister pleaded guilty and the Vienna Regional Court sentenced him to a two-year suspended prison sentence for possessing and processing child sexual abuse images after further investigation found that about 47,500 of the 76,000 child sexual abuse files he owned show children under the age of 14. He also confessed in court that he was never sober and sometimes used three grams of cocaine per day for months, claiming that it had contributed to his "violent fantasies". The court also ruled that Teichtmeister must undergo therapy and regularly submit to drug tests, facing placement in a center for mentally ill offenders if he violates these conditions. Teichtmeister accepted the verdict and refrained from appealing.

Austrian newspaper Exxpress reported on January 15, 2023, that another actor from Corsage has been accused of sexual assault by an anonymous insider of the film scene. "As with Teichtmeister, everything should be covered up with this actor so that the film project is not damaged. Again, many people know about the allegations, and again nobody is bringing it to the public," reported the whistleblower who informed Exxpress in June 2022 about the allegations against Teichtmeister. "In the industry it is known that there are also serious allegations against another Austrian actor. During the shooting of Corsage there were several serious sexual assaults on the film set. And the scene is also silent about that again", the insider said. Exxpress also reported that the film's director Marie Kreutzer had been informed about these cases, and that the name of the actor is known to the newspaper, but Austria's media law does not allow him to be named. Der Standard also reported that there are allegations against another actor from Corsage. Kreutzer confirmed to Der Standard on January 16, 2023, that her response to Mückstein's post in July 2022 was not about Teichtmeister. Der Standard wrote that Kreutzer had several conversations with the second actor about the #MeToo rumors circulating about him around the start of the shooting for Corsage. After the rumors were repeatedly brought to Kreutzer, she had several conversations with the actor, who always claimed that the rumors were unfounded. Kreutzer then recommended that he turn to "We_do", the contact and advice center for the film and television industry of Austria. According to reports, the actor followed her advice and is said to have deposited his willingness to talk at "We_do" if he was reported by those affected. In 2020, the actor filmed an anti-violence campaign by the Autonomous Austrian Women's Shelters speaking against violence against women. After the spot was published on social media in February 2021, several victims of violence, acquaintances or witnesses called the organization to ask why they chose this actor and the video was removed. On January 17, 2023, Corsage's production company, Film AG, issued a statement on the second actor accused of sexual assault: "Of course we take such allegations seriously, even if they have nothing to do with the production of the film 'Corsage' directly. Director Marie Kreutzer commented in detail on this last summer. Back then, she tried to get to the bottom of the rumors with both the actor and many whistleblowers. We had another detailed conversation with the actor yesterday. This conversation didn't bring us any new information either," the statement said.

== Belgium ==
On November 9, 2017, The Vlaamse Radio- en Televisieomroeporganisatie stopped all collaboration with Bart De Pauw, a Belgian TV producer, after several complains and allegations of sexual intimidation were filed against him. The TV producer is facing charges of stalking women and electronic nuisance behaviour. The trial was scheduled for January 14, 2021.

In May 2019, Julie Van Espen was the victim of a homicide in Antwerp. Her death has led to political protests against sexual violence. That month, over 15,000 people walked a 'silent march' in Antwerp for Van Espen. The hashtags '#enough', '#MeToo' and '#JulieVanEspen' were used by people on social media to command attention to the case, to raise awareness on sexual violence, and to address that the suspect of her murder had been convicted of rape twice before.

== Canada ==
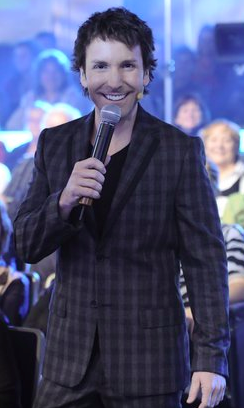
Éric Salvail, accused of sexual harassment

In French-speaking parts of Canada, the campaign is done under the hashtag #MoiAussi. A minister of Quebec, Hélène David, said she believed a global movement was in the works and we should salute this change. It was reported that calls to rape and women's crisis centers have increased dramatically, up to 553% above normal levels, since #MoiAussi started trending in October 2017, causing problems with staffing and budgeting. Quebec has contributed $1 million to help support these crisis hotlines. Hundreds of people marched to promote #MoiAussi at an event in Toronto in December 2017. In the wake of #MoiAussi, a candidate for mayor of Plateau-Mont-Royal dropped out of the race in response to allegations of sexual misconduct from several women. Montreal police set up a phone hotline for people who have been raped or harassed to call. Radio and TV presenter Éric Salvail was accused by 11 people of either sexually harassing them, or engaging in such conduct that they witnessed. Salvail He lost several endorsements and was suspended from most projects he was involved with. Humorist Gilbert Rozon resigned from all his positions and tried to sell his company in the wake of several sexual misconduct allegations, including one from producer Julie Snyder, a class action lawsuit from several women, and a sexual assault report filed with the police.

A newly popular hashtag, #EtMaintenant (#AndNow or Now What?) has started spreading as the "second part" to #MoiAussi to discuss what to do now that the magnitude of the problem with sexual misconduct in the workplace has been exposed. #EtMaintenant is represented by a yellow heart. It was unveiled on the show Tout le monde en parle in January 2018, with the stated purpose of determining which attitudes related to society, politics, institutions, and media need to be changed to ensure equity between all people.

Canadian Prime Minister Justin Trudeau has been a vocal advocate and supporter of the #MeToo movement. In a speech at the World Economic Forum in January 2018, Trudeau called for critical discussion on issues brought up by the #MeToo and Women's March movements and by Time's Up. Trudeau has also advocated and acted upon a high standard set for himself and members of his government. Trudeau stated that he holds a "zero tolerance for sexual assault, harassment or other forms of misconduct by his employees or caucus colleagues". As leader of the Liberal party, Trudeau initiated investigations on several members of parliament resulting in the dismissal of cabinet minister Kent Hehr, the resignation of MP Darshan Kang, and the suspension and later expulsion of MPs Scott Andrews and Massimo Pacetti. In an interview, Trudeau explained that the zero tolerance standard applied to himself as well and stated, "I've been very, very careful all my life to be thoughtful, to be respectful of people's space and people's headspace as well."

However, an editorial written in August 2000 resurfaced during his premiership regarding an alleged incident where an author accused Trudeau of groping a reporter and in July 2018 Trudeau publicly rejected the accusations. The piece stated Trudeau provided a "day-late" apology to the reporter, saying, "If I had known you were reporting for a national paper, I never would have been so forward." On July 6 Trudeau stated there was no need to investigate the allegations against him.

== Chile ==
In April–June 2018, female students marched around Chile and occupied universities to protest sexual harassment. Multiple actresses levelled accusations of Weinstein-like behavior at telenovela director Herval Abreu in April and film director Nicolás López in June; both men have denied any wrongdoing.

== China ==
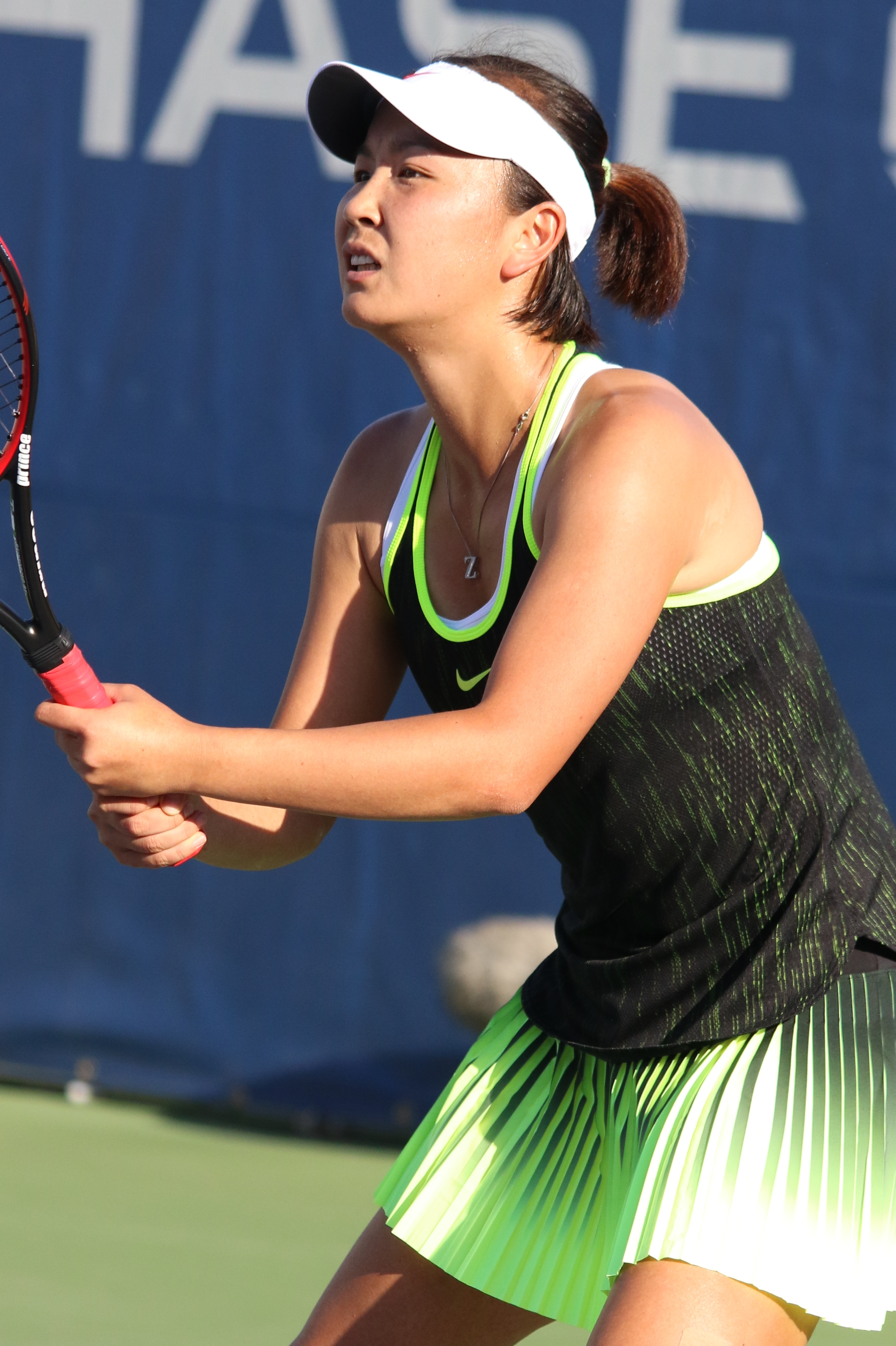
Chinese tennis star Peng Shuai disappeared after accusing a top Chinese official of sexual assault

On Chinese social networks, hashtags #WoYeShi or #metoo are sometimes used to denote the #Metoo hashtag. Mi tu pronounced in Mandarin, meaning "rice bunny", is also used with a hashtag of #RiceBunny.

In mainland China, the Chinese internet censorship service has slowed down the Chinese MeToo posts via censorship. So far, the #MeToo debate appears to be limited to universities.

An article appearing on the state-run China Daily newspaper states that sexual misconduct is rare in China due to superior education and culture has caused considerable Internet outrages.

A recent study from a pair of professors from City University of Hong Kong indicated that about 80% of working women in China have experienced sexual harassment at some point in their career, and there were strong reactions of anger online following the report. The article has since been taken down. Activist Feng Yuan points out that China does not have national laws prohibiting sexual harassment, and uses state media to encourage women to focus on family and stay home. New laws recently made it illegal for television programming to contain images of a women's cleavage, sexual acts outside of marriage, or any topics that present "Western lifestyles" in a positive light. #MeToo has received extreme governmental censorship online.

Sophie Richardson, then Human Rights Watch director for China, stated the Chinese government regularly suppresses discussion of women's rights, for example an incident in 2015 where Li Tingting and four other activists were arrested when the government learned they planned to hand out stickers about preventing sexual harassment on public transportation.

In Hong Kong, track and field athlete Vera Lui Lai-Yiu posted her case of sex abuse alongside #metoo on her Facebook fanpage on her 23rd birthday. She posted in response to a similar action by gymnast McKayla Maroney. Lui posted a picture of herself holding a piece of paper with the handwritten words "#metoo lly" (her initials). In January 2018, student Zheng Xi publicly started a campaign against sexual harassment in response to #MeToo.

Dr. Luo Xixi, an academic, revealed being sexually assaulted by a professor at Beihang University when she was in her 20s. Luo gathered extensive evidence from many women, including recordings, and presented it to the institution. She waited until the professor was already suspended before going public with the story. Her post was viewed over 3 million times within 24 hours. She said that #metoo gave her the courage to speak up. She is currently living in the US.

Zhou Xiaoxuan, a 25-year-old screenwriter in Beijing, stated that the China Central Television host and anchor Zhu Jun assaulted her in his dressing room while she was an intern of his in 2014. When she went to the police, she was urged her to drop her report, telling her that her parents, who both work for government institutions, could lose their jobs. So for years, Ms. Zhou kept what had happened a secret, only known by herself, her parents, and some close friends. That was until one day, where she saw a "#MeToo" post, and decided to share her own story. Her intentions were to share with her friends that this happens to people close to themselves, but instead her post was shared rapidly over the Chinese internet, until the Chinese government intervened and banned state-run media from covering the story. Zhou has sued Zhu, who has countersued.

Yue Xin, an undergraduate of Peking University in Beijing, led a campaign to uncover information regarding the alleged assault and subsequent suicide of Gao Yan, a student who was allegedly assaulted by former professor Shang Yang. Peking University took measures to attempt to dissuade Yue from pursuing her investigation. Yue Xin would eventually participate in the Jasic Incident.

In June 2021, a Weibo (Chinese Twitter) user, Du Meizhu (都美竹), revealed that she had been sexually and emotionally assaulted by the top-tier Canadian Chinese idol Kris Wu (吴亦凡) while she was 17. On July 18, she revealed that Kris had sex with women on the pretext of supporting them in the entertainment industry. In particular, she claimed that there were more than eight victims, including her, and that two of them were minors, which intensified the impact. After her first accusation, at least 24 women have revealed that they have been sexually assaulted by Kris. She posted an ultimatum on Weibo, urging Wu to apologize to all the victims of his sexual and emotional abuse and leave the show business, lest she release video and photo evidence that she had gathered. Du's bravery, besides triggering support from celebrities and public figures who had suffered abuse under Wu, also inspired public support in China leading to the creation of the #girls help girls# hashtag. In the hashtag, netizens expressed support for Du, shared their own experiences with sexual violence, and reflected on the social status of women and sexual violence in contemporary Chinese patriarchy. The campaign set in motion by Du Meizhu sparked the #MeToo movement in China, with Kris Wu being arrested on rape charges on August 16, 2021. Consequently, Kris Wu was tried for rape and was convicted of raping three drunken women on November 25, 2022, for which he was sentenced to 11 years and 10 months in prison.

On November 2, 2021, professional tennis player and former doubles world no. 1 Peng Shuai shared allegations of sexual assault against Zhang Gaoli, former Vice Premier of the People's Republic of China and a high-ranked official of the Chinese Communist Party cadre.

In June 2024, activist Huang Xueqin was reported by a support group to have been sentenced to five years in prison after having been found guilty of "subverting state power." Wang was sentenced to three and a half years. The support group stated that Huang planned to appeal.

== Denmark ==
In September 2020, a letter addressed to Sofie Linde, signed by 700 women, stated that she was not the only person being sexually harassed. Over the following months, debate eventually resulted in the Lord Mayor of Copenhagen, Frank Jensen, admitting that he had sexually harassed women over a span of about 30 years. He resigned one day later. The head of the Danish Social Liberal Party, Morten Østergaard, also resigned.

== Egypt ==
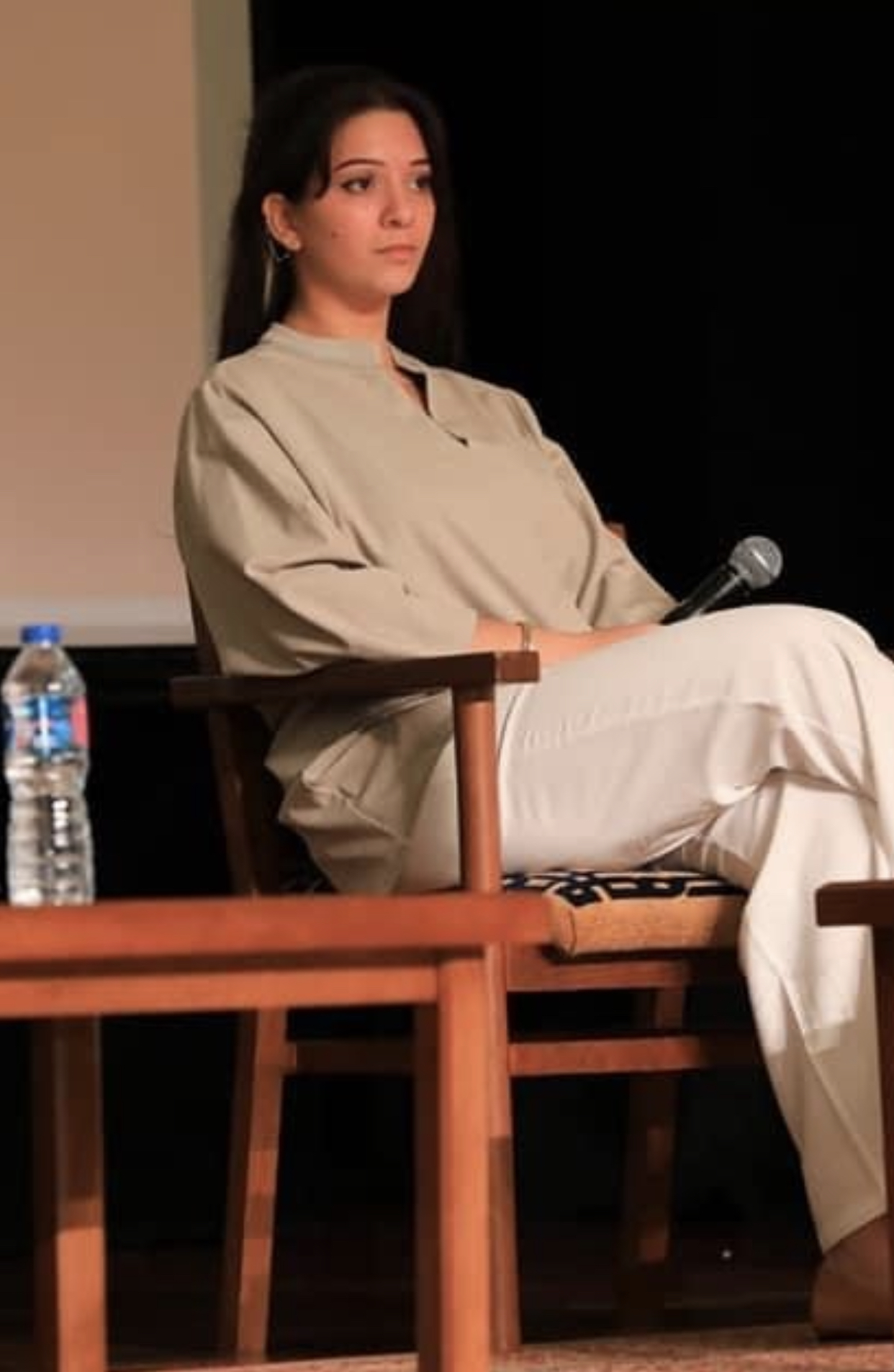
Nadeen Ashraf's use of social media instigated the #MeToo movement within Egypt.

The #MeToo movement in Egypt was instigated by the social media campaign of student Nadeen Ashraf, who was compelled to create the account "Assault Police" to enable women in Egypt to have a public platform to call out their abusers anonymously.

== Ethiopia ==
Alyssa Milano specifically called for supporting the victims in Ethiopia in an interview with Rolling Stone. In Ethiopia, up to 40% of students may have experienced sexual violence. In November 2017, nine middle-school aged girls organized together and spoke out about an abusive teacher in their school, saying they got the idea from the "Me Too" movement. The teacher was dismissed and referred to law enforcement. UNICEF's Amanda Westfall said the teacher likely would have gotten away with it just a few years ago.

== France ==
Variants of the phrase trended in France, especially #BalanceTonPorc (#DenounceYourPig), which encouraged users to share the names of their alleged abusers. #BalanceTonPorc was first used by Sandra Muller. She was requested to take down her tweet by two lawyers. In France, 93% of complaints against criminal sexual harassment are dropped or never followed up on by law enforcement. Prosecutions are extremely rare, and only 65 of 1,048 sexual harassment lawsuits from 2014 actually led to a conviction. In 40% of workplace sexual violence cases, the person who makes the complaint is reprimanded or fired, while the accused person is typically not investigated or punished. There is no French equivalent to the U.S. Equal Employment Opportunity Commission, which gives victims a place to report workplace sexual violence if the employer and/or law enforcement refuses to address the complaint. Brigitte Macron, wife of French President Emmanuel Macron, expressed support for the #MeToo movement.

Initially the hashtag went viral, but there was an almost immediate media backlash. Soon after, 100 high-profile French women, including actress Catherine Deneuve, former actress and radio host Brigitte Lahaie, art critic and author Catherine Millet, and German singer and actress Ingrid Caven, signed an open letter by Abnousse Shalmani which criticized the #MeToo / #BalanceTonPorc campaign.

The people who signed the letter, especially Deneuve and Millet, were criticized for saying men should have the "right to pester" women. The letter also told people not to be bothered by small amounts of sexual harassment, for example men who rub against women on public transportation. The letter states women should "consider it as the expression of a great sexual misery, or even as a nonevent". French politician Marlène Schiappa said some aspects of the letter were "profoundly shocking" and "we have immense difficulty convincing young women that when a man rubs his genitals against a woman in the Métro without her consent, it is an act of sexual assault that can lead to three years in prison and a 75,000 euro fine."

A week after its publication, Deneuve issued a letter of clarification, and said although she still agrees with the spirit of the original letter, she wants to clarify that she does believe sexual harassment and assault are real problems, and apologized to all victims of unpleasant sexual acts who read the letter and felt hurt by it.

Political commentator Anastasia Colosimo said the movement to prevent sexual misconduct at work is more accepted by younger women in France because they take sexual freedom as a given, while older feminists are afraid #MeToo may hurt the sexual revolution. Legal professional Marilyn Baldeck noted that when people are given "concrete examples" of sexual misconduct, they often "change their minds and acknowledge how harmful some situations can be". French politician Sandrine Rousseau said that the #MeToo movement will continue because French women have been silenced for too long. A petition aimed at President Emmanuel Macron demanded sexual harassment to be taken more seriously in France, and received more than 100,000 signatures in three days.

Singer Tom Connan said in an interview published by L'Obs that he had been the victim of sexual harassment and stated that men (not only women) were also affected by the problem.

NousToutes

In 2018, 30,000 women marched in Paris with the #NousToutes, dressing in purple.

Tens of thousands of men and women demonstrated on November 23, 2019, in more than 30 cities.

Ligue du LOL

In February 2019, prominent male Parisian journalists were accused of forming a group called the "Ligue du LOL" that ran online harassment campaigns against feminists, female journalists, writers of color and gay people over a 10-year period. The group's founder, Vincent Glad, was suspended by the daily newspaper Libération, whose own fact-checking unit broke the story.

The NGO SOS Racisme called for a judicial investigation.

== Germany ==
MeToo was not particularly popular in Germany until January 11, 2018, when it started trending after the Die Zeit weekly newspaper published reports about three German former actresses who alleged that award-winning TV director Dieter Wedel had committed sexual assault. There have been official concerns about the alleged long-time coverup of Wedel's actions because most of his work was done through public broadcasting and received government money. The report detailed a months-long investigation into the three allegations, and included 50 interviews. Wedel has not responded to the allegations in Die Zeit, stating through a spokesperson he is in the hospital and having heart trouble. Another high-profile German case concerned the former president of the Munich Academy of Music, Siegfried Mauser. In a study of 2000 Germans conducted after the initial spread of #MeToo, it was found that 43% of women and 12% of men have experienced sexual harassment or abuse, most commonly inappropriate touching.

== Greece ==
The MeToo movement took off in Greece when, in November 2020, Olympic sailing champion Sofia Bekatorou revealed publicly that she had been the victim of sexual assault by a senior Hellenic Sailing Federation (HSF) executive in 1998. The case's revelation led to a wave of solidarity among all the segments of the Greek society with the hashtag #MeTinSofia (#IAmWithSofia) becoming a hit and the country's political leadership, including Prime Minister Kyriakos Mitsotakis and President Katerina Sakellaropoulou, expressing their full support to her. The mounting pressure led to the resignation of the assailant from the HSF.

The wave of #MeToo allegations rocked the country and spread from Sports sector to other segments of the Greek social life, including the Arts and Entertainment industry, and eventually inspired Zeta Douka and a number of other actresses and actors to come forward with their own stories of workplace bullying, sexual harassment and abuse, with reports surfacing about the involvement of high-profile people, such as actors George Kimoulis and Petros Filippidis, as well as the Greek National Theatre director Dimitris Lignadis, in violent incidents, sexual assaults and rapes. Following these revelations, Filippidis was removed from the TV shows he was starring, and Lignadis resigned from his position where he was hired by Greek Culture Minister Lina Mendoni under controversial circumstances which were the subject of a public debate and strong criticism against Mendoni. Lignadis was later arrested by the authorities on rape charges. Following the #MeToo wave, the Greek government proposed in February 2021 law changes designed to combat sexual abuse in the country.

== Iran ==
In October 2018, in the Islamic Republic of Iran, Grand Ayatollah Ali Khamenei issued a message stating the "disaster of countless sexual assaults on Western women – including incidents leading to #Metoo campaign" can be solved with the Islamic solution of hijab.

In August 2020, a #Metoo movement gained momentum on social media in Iran. Most prominently, in a New York Times article by Farnaz Fassihi, published on October 20, 2020, thirteen women accused Aydin Aghdashloo, an internationally famous Iranian artist with ties to the Iranian regime, of repeated acts of sexual assault and abuse over many years. The wave of allegations against Aghdashloo began with a Twitter thread by former journalist Sara Omatali on August 22, 2020, and were corroborated by 45 people in research for the Times article. The article stated that, out of these 45 people interviewed, "nineteen described him as the 'Harvey Weinstein of Iran'." Aghdashloo responded by stating that "the allegations of sexual abuse against me are full of significant inaccuracies, mischaracterizations and fabrications."

At the same time, discussion of the case of university art professor Keivan Emamverdi flooded Iranian Twitter accounts in 2020. He was accused by multiple female students of inviting them to his home, then drugging and raping them. After a number of former students leveled allegations against Emamverdi on social media — using fake names to remain anonymous — Tehran's police chief announced Emamverdi's arrest on August 25, 2020.

== India ==
The use of the #MeToo hashtag on social media spread quickly in India, where sexual harassment is commonly referred to by the word 'eve-teasing', a term described as misleading, tame, and diluting the seriousness of the crime. In response to #MeToo, there have been attempts to teach Indian women about workplace rights and safe reporting, as well as educate men about the scope of the problem. Some have likened #MeToo to a 2012 social movement which followed a violent gang rape in New Delhi that later resulted in a woman's death, which caused the Indian government to institute harsher punishments for rape. Others have suggested there was underlying public anger over a Delhi rape conviction that was overturned by Judge Ashutosh Kumar a month before against filmmaker and writer Mahmood Farooqui, ruling that a "feeble" no was not enough to revoke consent because it was typical for one partner to be less willing. The case is being appealed to the Supreme Court. Activist Jasmeen Patheja, head of Blank Noise, stated #MeToo's power is in demonstrating India can no longer ignore the scope of the problem. Kaimini Jaiswal, a lawyer at the Supreme Court of India, stressed the importance of teaching women how to read, especially in rural villages, because most women in these areas are illiterate and financially and emotionally dependent on a male relative.

Blogger Sheena Dabholkar's viral #MeToo tweet resulted in the boycott of Khodu Irani's popular Pune pub, High Spirits, by several well-known performers. Several women mentioned Mahesh Murthy, which initiated a police case in January 2018. The Trends Desk of The Indian Express wrote many Indian men are speaking up as a part of #MeToo, including discussions about consent and how some men are also abused. Rina Chandran of Reuters said that #MeToo is ignoring the 600,000 women in India who are currently involuntary sex workers, and are typically poor, uneducated or lack a family.

There were reports of mass sexual assaults during the 2018 new year's celebrations in Bangalore, which have been associated with #MeToo. The incidents were initially dismissed by the police until someone uploaded CCTV footage of the assaults to social media. Home Minister G. Parameshwara, Abu Azmi, and other officials came under fire for stating "western" women's clothing and values were the cause of the rapes and that women's families should not allow them to go to parties or major celebrations.

Several lists of alleged rapists and harassers started spreading on social media in India, including "The List" which initially included the names of about sixty highly respected academic men. The List of Sexual Harassers in Academia ("LoSHA") was posted on October 24, 2017, by activist Inji Pennu and an Indian student in California named Raya Sarkar, who alleged they personally confirmed every incident. This list has resulted in criticism against #MeToo because the allegations were unverified before they started spreading on social media. Some of the victims from the list have come forward to explain they were ignored, mistreated or retaliated against when they tried to pursue action. Sarkar has defended The List, saying that she posted it only to warn her friends about professors and academics to avoid (mostly upper caste men), and had no idea it could become so popular. A second list came out a week later that was made by women from a lower caste background and included more names, raising the total to around 70.

Twelve prominent Indian feminists dismissed The List in a formal letter, saying they understand that the justice system is typically tilted against victims, but unverified claims make things harder for the feminist movement. Writers Rhea Dangwal and Namrata Gupta responded that most victims from the list were poor students who tried to go through official channels without success or recourse, while every single man on the list can defend himself socially and legally.

On September 27, 2018, former actress Tanushree Dutta accused Nana Patekar of sexual harassment, which was the catalyst of the "Me Too" movement in India. The accusation by Dutta stirred a row of accusations from many women in industries including media and politics. In October 2018, the Minister of state for External Affairs, MJ Akbar was accused of sexual harassment by several female colleagues through the 'Me Too' Movement in India.

On October 21, 2018, former music director Anu Malik was suspended from the jury panel of Indian Idol 2018, after facing multiple allegations of sexual harassment made through the movement.

== Israel ==
In Israel, the Hebrew hashtag גםאנחנו# (#UsToo) began trending on October 18, 2017, with a front page spread in the newspaper Yedioth Ahronoth. Asi Levi said at the Ophir Award ceremony that unlike America, in Israel the status of those accused does not change. A hashtag for men, #HowIWillChange, has also become popular.

== Italy ==
In Italy, women posted stories of assault and harassment under the hashtag #QuellaVoltaChe, which translates literally as "TheTimeThat". The phrase was launched by the journalist Giulia Blasi. Italian journalist Simona Siri wrote in The Washington Post that the initially popular movement quickly died out in Italy. She stated that Italian politician and former Prime Minister Silvio Berlusconi, who is known for his role in wild parties (Bunga Bunga bacchanals) with underage girls and prostitutes, has contributed to a strong sexist culture with few female politicians in positions of power. Movie directors Fausto Brizzi and Giuseppe Tornatore were accused of harassment by more than a dozen women but did not face any significant consequences or media scrutiny.

The New York Times described the movement in Italy as "Meh" — later referring to the country as "the land that #MeToo forgot" — due to the lack of discussion. Laura Boldrini, the president of the lower house of Parliament, has declared that the movement cannot touch Italy because although there is much harassment, victims are often silenced and there is also a belief that "in our country, there are no harassers". It has been reported that nearly 70% of female university students have been sexually harassed, and it is widely accepted that Italy is behind other countries when it comes to gender rights. In response to #QuellaVoltaChe, one article from Libero was titled, "First they put out, then they whine and pretend to regret it."

Italian Fabrizio Lombardo, an employee and friend of Harvey Weinstein, was widely covered by the media after he was accused of allegations that he aided Weinstein in sexually harassing Italian actress and former model Asia Argento, though he denies all wrongdoing. Argento said of Italy, "Nothing has changed", and described her life after going public with the allegations as living a nightmare. She has made plans to leave Italy. Conservative TV news editor Alessandro Sallusti criticized Argento for being an accomplice to Weinstein for not reporting him immediately, and several other public figures and politicians questioned her innocence.

The Non Una di Meno group (Not One Woman Less), which is dedicated to stopping violence against women, wrote a letter to support Argento and organised a protest in November 2017 where tens of thousands of people gathered in Rome. Blogger Abbatto i muri (I Break Down Walls), journalist Ida Dominijanni, Cagne sciolte (literally, Loose Bitches), and author Michela Marzano also strongly supported Argento publicly. Italian women's rights activist Lorella Zanardo has stated that it is taken for granted that women must give or sell their body in order to get high-profile positions in politics, film, and media.

Maria Elena Boschi, a politician who has created governmental initiatives aimed at teaching women it is okay to say no to sexual advances, has been targeted in the news and on social media for her support of the #QuellaVoltaChe movement. She has been impersonated in several fake interviews where the actresses portray Boschi in unflattering ways. Photoshopped images of Boschi have been shared widely on social media, including a doctored image with her underwear showing during her swearing-in ceremony, which never occurred. Francesca Puglisi, the chair of the Commission of Inquiry into Femicide in Italy, said that one woman is killed every two days on average by male violence, and the problem is severely under-reported, though she credited the #QuellaVoltaChe hashtag and the work by Boschi with making a positive difference.

Argento, herself, was accused of sexual misconduct in 2018 by actor Jimmy Bennett. Following this allegation, Argento was fired from her work on The X Factor Italy.

== Japan ==
According to Shiori Itō, in Japan only around 4% of rapes are reported due to social stigmas against sexual assault survivors, of which half of the criminal charges are dropped by prosecutors. According to her, many rape myths in Japanese culture typically hold women accountable for sexual assaults instead of the assaulter, creating an environment where even if victims come forward "Japanese society wants them to stay silent." According to her, The word "rape" is taboo in Japan, instead described with less threatening words like saying an underage victim was "tricked," or a woman was "violated" thus contributing to a public lacking comprehensive understanding of the pervasiveness of the problem.

Political Scientist Mari Miura argues that a lack of solidarity among women and the complicated, stigmatized and lengthy process of prosecuting rapists deters sexual assault survivors from speaking out.

According to Yumi E. Suzuki, victims of sexual violence in Japan tend to remain silent after victimization due to unsupportive attitudes from criminal justice officials and the general public. She says that the lay judge system (saiban-in seido) introduced in 2009 may change this trend and improve the response to victims.

Prior to 2017, laws regarding the treatment of sexual assault had remained unchanged since 1907. Previously, oral and anal rape was considered sexual assault (強制わいせつ, kyōsei waisetsu) and not rape (強姦, gōkan). A 2017 amendment to the law made the forced insertion of male genitalia into the victim's oral cavity or anus the same crime as traditional rape, regardless of the victim's gender, and changed the legal name of the crime to forced sexual intercourse (強制性交, kyōsei seikō). And while previously, in order to protect the privacy of the victim, the perpetrator could not be prosecuted unless the victim filed a complaint, this was changed so that the perpetrator could be prosecuted with or without a complaint from the victim, in order to avoid placing an emotional burden on the victim to decide whether or not to file a complaint. In addition, the minimum penalty was increased from three to five years.

Multiple other authors and public figures have criticized what they saw as Japan's silence on the topic of sexual assault, such as Kyoko Nakajima, Mayumi Mori, Kirsten King, Akiko Kobayashi, Hakuo Au (née Haruka Ito). BuzzFeed Japan writer Takumi Harimaya has stated that by sharing these stories, other victims of sexual assault and harassment can know they are not alone. Another journalist, Keiko Kojima stated that the movement is necessary to let people know that it is okay to say no to sexual violence, including male victims. She further remarked that despite how it is attacked in Japanese media, that #MeToo is not an "anti-man" campaign and that it is simply about anti-violence and anti-harassment. Kojima also believes it is extremely important for men to call out behaviors in others such as sexual harassment or having sex with someone who is unconscious and that every person who is not committing sexual violence is part of the #MeToo movement, whether they are male or female.

As part of the #MeToo movement, Shiori Itō went public alleging that she was raped by Noriyuki Yamaguchi, a prominent TV journalist and acquaintance of Japanese Prime Minister Shinzo Abe, an admission she says was unthinkable for a woman to do in Japan. Yamaguchi rejects her accusations, and says that sex was consensual. She said her experience with Japan's legal system showed her that victims of sex crimes were undermined and ignored. She called for the Japanese parliament to update Japan's laws regarding rape, which were over a century old. She explains how she could not get information on which hospital provides rape kits without going through a preliminary interview in person. When she went to the police, she was discouraged from filing a report, and informed her career would be ruined for no reason if she did this. She was told she did not act like a victim, and had to be interviewed by several officers, including one who made her reenact the rape with a dummy while he took pictures. Although they initially said they would arrest Yamaguchi, the case and charges were unexpectedly dropped. Itō then went to the media, but no one would take her story. When she spoke about the experience at a press conference, she made national news and immediately started receiving a negative backlash, hate mail, and threats. She has been unsuccessful in her attempts to have criminal charges brought against Yamaguchi, but as of 2018 she was still pursuing a civil case against him, which he was defending. After reflecting on her experience with reporting sexual assault, Itō notes that there "is little concept of sexual consent in the law or in society" which indicates a need for more education in schools especially given the prevalence of rape culture and power imbalances in Japanese society. Itō further stated that the #MeToo Movement was small in Japan but that "what's happened in the United States and elsewhere has provided an opening in our media to discuss sexual harassment and assault here, and to raise awareness".

In 2018, Junichi Fukuda, a deputy finance minister in the Abe Administration, resigned after being accused of sexual harassment by his former subordinates and an anonymous TV Asahi reporter. TV Asahi warned against their employee making this allegation and going public with the allegedly incriminating conversation between her and Fukuda. Finance Minister Tarō Asō said of Fukuda, "There is no crime of sexual harassment in Japan, and it is different from sexual assault or murder. As long as Fukuda denies guilt, the case will go to trial", and announced that the investigation by the Ministry of Finance would be closed. However, Aso disciplined Fukuda on the grounds that he had damaged the dignity of the Ministry of Finance. Asō retained his job despite commenting that replacing female reporters with men should stop sexual harassment.

A former member of the Japanese idol group Niji no Conquistador pressed charges against Pixiv representative director, Hiroaki Nagata, for sexual harassment during her time with the group, motivated by the #MeToo movement. Nagata resigned following the lawsuit.

As a result of the severe culture of victim blaming, the slogan #WeToo was developed in conjunction with #MeToo. The slogan was launched to spur more women to openly support the feminist agenda of revealing the prevalence of sexual harassment and showing solidarity with victims. By replacing "Me" with "We", the slogan allowed women to contribute to the movement without having to speak of their own experience with sexual harassment, which is associated with the risk of receiving stigma, shame, and ostracization. The slogan was developed by Monica Fukuhara, who had first hand experience in the difficulty women in Japan face in regards to the fear of speaking of their experience with sexual assault.

Another manifestation of the MeToo movement in Japan was the following development of the KuToo campaign. Based on the Japanese word "kutsu" for shoes and the word for pain "kutsuu", the campaign was launched in response to the corporate norm that expects women at the workplace to always wear high heels. Similarly, women are pressured to wear high heels when job hunting, so as to raise the prospects of finding a competitive position in a corporation. Founded and supported by writer Yumi Ishikawa, the campaign gained enough support to result in a petition being sent to labour ministry officials. Specifically, KuToo aims to prompt officials to create anti-sexual harassment and discrimination laws that will prohibit companies from restricting women from wearing anything other than high heels at the workplace.

== Kenya ==
When #MeToo first went viral in October 2017, coverage was overshadowed in Kenya by a presidential election that was occurring the next week. However, the #MeToo movement started slowly spreading in Kenya after the election was over. In January 2018, it became especially popular after several new mothers alleged sexual misconduct at Kenyatta National Hospital, claiming that after giving birth they have been sexually assaulted when they went alone to breastfeed. There were also allegations that children in the hospital have been sexually assaulted. The hospital announced that the women were all lying, but in the future, women should stay together in groups in the hospital to prevent sexual assault. In response, hundreds of people protested in the streets of Nairobi, Kenya, and an investigation was initiated by the health minister.

== Lithuania ==
The independent cinema director Šarūnas Bartas and the politician Mykolas Majauskas galvanized Lithuania's first #MeToo cases in 2018. In neither case legal prosecution followed. Bartas continues to direct. Majauskas survived two impeachment attempts and remains in politics. In the latter case the media withheld the names of the alleged victims due to alleged intimidation and their fears of retaliation.

== Nepal ==
Former Mayor of Kathmandu Keshav Sthapit has been accused of sexual harassment by two female office clerks of the Kathmandu Metropolitan Office, Rashmila Prajapati and Ujjwala Maharjan, as a part of the Me Too movement in Nepal.

== Nigeria ==
=== Culture ===
Nigerian women and children get sexually assaulted every day and do not speak up about it due to fear of stigmatisation and prejudice. Official silence seems to surround sexual abuse of women in Nigeria, with the police frequently not taking sexual abuse reports seriously. As a result, men, who are often the perpetrators of sexual abuse go unchallenged, and unpunished owing to factors such as culture and popular beliefs. The custom of victim blaming is evident in testimonies rape and sexual abuse survivors. Nigerian cultures look down on the open discussions of sexual matters and desires. A great deal of the pressure to remain silent stems from socio-cultural values, customs and expectations about what constitutes socially accepted behaviours. Cultural socialisation recognises men as having a naturally stronger sexual drive, and speaks of women in terms of shame, lack of interest in sexual matters and as one to be conquered by a domineering man. Nigerians are socially nurtured and fed by oppressive patriarchal subjectivities that try to instil a sense of what is normal: sexually-speaking.

=== Role of power and privilege ===
There is a factor of power influencing the slow growth of the movement in Nigeria. The country is a highly patriarchal society. Women have complained of how unimaginable it is in the country to report cases of harassment. Yet, sexual harassment is so prominent within the country that it is perceived as almost a right to men.

=== Brenda Uphopho case ===
She had been assaulted three times by three different men. The first incident took place at age five. At that time, she was too young to understand what happened until a similar incident occurred at age 18. She was at a party when a stranger forced her to have sex with him. Upon her refusal, he beat her up and raped her. Due to the stigma attached to being raped, she resorted to silence. The final experience took place at her workplace when her boss forcibly put his hand under her skirt. She still remained silent with the notion of not being believed and being judged by others. Realizing she could not remain silent and needing to make an impact, Uphopho currently works with her husband to break the "culture of silence" around abuse in Nigeria. They produced a play called Shattered which seeks to encourage victims of sexual abuse to speak up.

== Norway ==
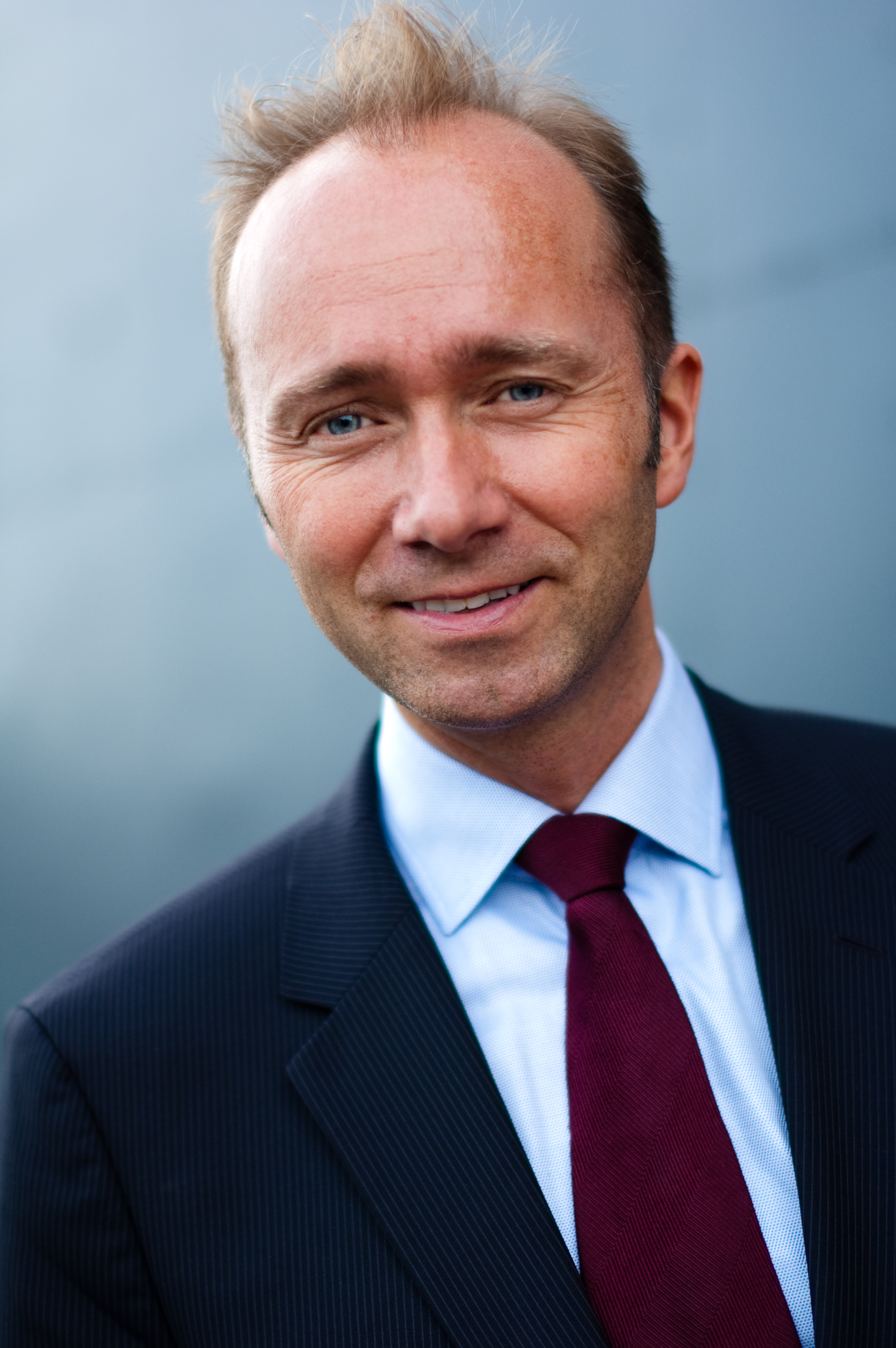
Trond Giske announced his permanent withdrawal from politics in 2020 following accusations of sexual harassment.

In Norway, under the hashtag #stilleforopptak (en. SilentforRecording), almost 600 actresses signed a petition and shared their stories through Aftenposten on November 16, 2017. This also inspired dancers and musicians to create their own petitions, #nårdansenstopper (en. WhentheDanceStops) signed by 792 dancers, and #nårmusikkenstilner (en. WhentheMusicQuiets) signed by over 1110 musicians.

Trond Giske, the deputy leader of the Norwegian Labour Party and a former cabinet minister in Norway, resigned from his political positions on January 7, 2018, after being accused of an extensive pattern of sexual assault and sexual harassment of young women, and of taking advantage of his political positions to make unwanted sexual advances. The accusations came in the context of the Me Too debate and dominated Norwegian media for several weeks from December 2017. Accusations towards the now former leader of the Norwegian Young Conservatives, Kristian Tonning Riise, also saw the light of day. In a Facebook post, Tonning Riise wrote: "I have been confronted with the fact that members of the Norwegian Young Conservatives on several occasions have reacted to my behaviour." It would later be revealed that the Conservative Party had received 15 alerts, whereas 10 of them regarded Tonning Riise. Ulf Leirstein, Norwegian politician for the Progress Party and member of the Storting, had to take a break from office after it was discovered that he had shared pornographic images with a 14-year-old member of the Progress Party's Youth and suggested a threesome between him, a 30-year-old woman and a 15-year-old member of the Progress Party's Youth.

== Pakistan ==
After the rape and murder of 7-year-old Zainab Ansari in January 2018, a wave of declarations were posted on Pakistan social media in #MeToo style. Sexual assault against a minor in Pakistan will result in 14 to 20 years in prison and a fine of 1 millions rupees. Sheema Kermani, a classical dancer, has been called the leader of the Pakistan #MeToo movement. Former model Frieha Altaf and designer Maheem Khan shared stories of sexual abuse, and challenged Pakistan to be more proactive at stopping children from getting raped.

In April 2018, Meesha Shafi accused fellow singer Ali Zafar of harassment, however, Zafar filed a defamation suit against her and won the trial after eight years in 2026.

== Palestine ==
#AnaKaman or وأنا كمان# (#MeToo) has also been used by Palestinian women from refugee camps.

== Philippines ==
The Me Too movement has slowly picked up in the Philippines. In the culture of the Philippines, shaming and victim blaming are still present and is often encouraged. They are afraid to say #MeToo because people do not believe them. Stories finally were heard from after actress Saab Magalona retweeted Alyssa Milano's infamous quote. The accusations revolved around the entertainment industry as one of the bands, Jensen and The Flips was being brought up and they acknowledged their mistakes and apologized for their misconduct. Statistics from the Philippine Commission on Women from 2004 to 2013 revealed that only 629 cases had been recorded with the Philippine national police's Women and Children Protection Center. This figure is believed to only be a fraction of the actual number of harassment offenses committed against women. While the movement has not been as big as in the U.S., other movements such as #BabaeAko have started as a result of #MeToo. #BabaeAko translates to "I am a Woman" and began in May after President Rodrigo Duterte declared that the next Chief Justice of Philippines could not be a woman.

== Russia ==
#IDidntWantToDie (#ЯНеХотелаУмирать) and #IFearMen (#ЯБоюсьМужчин)

In July 2019, activist Alena Popova and blogger Alexandra Mitroshina launched a campaign on Instagram to advocate for the adoption of a law on preventing domestic violence. The idea was supported by other female authors of popular blogs, and the participants took photos of themselves wearing makeup that simulated the marks of beatings. In mid-October, another major flash mob emerged on the Russian internet – #IAmAfraidOfMen. Female users are sharing stories of harassment and domestic violence. The hashtag became a trending topic on the Russian segment of Twitter. In October, the State Duma held hearings on a bill to protect victims of domestic violence, although this is not the first attempt to draw deputies' attention to the problem. The activists' proposal was considered in the lower house of parliament back in 2016, but at that time the document did not even pass the first reading.

== Serbia ==
Inspired by the women of the global MeToo movement, Marija Lukić has stood up against Milutin Jeličić, her boss and the Mayor of Brus, a small town in central Serbia and taken her accusations to court. She and several other women from Brus have accused Mayor of sexual harassment and disturbing messages. Lukić faced threats and pressure, but she also received scores of support messages flooding in on social media with the hashtag #PravdaZaMarijuLukić (#JusticeForMarijaLukić). These events were one of the triggers for the anti-government protests, which forced Jeličić to resign from office and his duties in the governing Serbian Progressive Party were suspended. Lukić stated that she no longer believes in Serbian justice, but she is determined to fight for her rights at the European Court of Human Rights. On July 10, 2020, Mutin Jeličić received a three-month prison sentence.

In January 2021, Serbian actress Milena Radulović (sr) accused Miroslav "Mika" Aleksić (sr) of raping her, when he was her mentor at the Stvar Srca acting studio, as published in an interview by Blic. He was later arrested due to allegations from four other women of sexual abuse between 2008 and 2020. During this time, the hashtag #NisiSama (#YouAreNotAlone) gained popularity.

In March 2021, Serbian actress Danijela Štajnfeld named Branislav Lečić as her rapist from 2012 after previously making a documentary "Hold Me Right" about the sexual assault and its impact on survivors. A few days later another actress, Merima Isaković (sr) accused Lečić of raping her in 1978.

In April 2021, the vice president of the Party of Freedom And Justice, Marinika Tepić, accused Dragan Marković-Palma and his partners for "prostitution of women and girls" in Jagodina. Tepić also revealed a video of the testimony of an anonymous man who is informed of the prostitution case. In the video he explained how everything was organized, who knew everything about cheating minors and which government members attended parties where prostitution was happening, claiming that all of this was happening in Hotel Končarevo whose "real owner" is Palma. The prosecutors announced that they would investigate the claims.

In June 2021, five survivors (with over 20 more who did not talk on the record) talked in Vreme about their assaulter "S" from Petnica Science Center, with the physical and mental assaults dating back to 2003. A few days later, in "S's" (Branislav Savić) flat the police found boxes of photos of underage girls.

== South Korea ==
In South Korea, the Me Too movement started to gain momentum as public prosecutor Seo Ji-hyeon shared her experience of assault by a high-level prosecutor and oppression of government authorities on national television on January 29, 2018. As part of her interview, Seo claimed that she was sexually assaulted by then Korean Ministry of Justice Policy Planning Director and former prosecutor Ahn Tae-geun at a funeral in 2010. She reported the activity to her superiors, however, her superiors covered up the incident and demoted her to Changwon Public Prosecutor's Office from her post in Seoul, in spite of the fact that she was highly praised and awarded for her work performance by her superiors prior to the incident.

After Seo's public admittance of sexual assault, the Me Too movement spread quickly to other areas of society. On February 13, 2018, several women, including former actress Kim Soo-hee and actress Hong Seon-joo, accused Lee Yountaek, a prominent and critically acclaimed stage director, of sexual harassment. Lee allegedly forced many women in his theater troupe, for 18 years, to massage his genital area prior to raping them. In addition, Kim Soo-hee stated that in 2005, Lee raped her and got her pregnant, for which she had an abortion. Moreover, actress Hong Seon-joo alleged that Lee forcibly penetrated her private part with sticks and wooden chopsticks, saying it will help her vocalization. As a result, Lee resigned from all his positions in the theater world and formally apologized to the victims. Lee admitted to all his crimes except the abortion.

However, discussion on sexual assault and harassment preceded the MeToo with a series of hashtags under the scope of #000_nae_seongpongnyeok (#sexual_violence_in_000) with particular attention in the arts and culture #yeonghwagye_nae_seongpongnyeok (#sexual_violence_in_the_film_industry). These hashtags were used on Twitter in October 2016, a year before the MeToo movement in the West. They document a work culture that encourages men to act aggressively, and women to "defeminize" in order to avoid objectification. Anonymous accounts set up to document sexual assault and harassment received legal action, and or had personal information leaked (doxing). In addition to the trauma of sexual assault, they must also face the financial, psychological and social burden of litigation.

On February 22, 2018, actor Oh Dal-su was accused of sexual harassment, for which he denied the accusation. However, February 26, further accusations against Oh were broadcast on JTBC Newsroom, during which an interview was conducted with the woman who had accused Oh of sexual harassment and sexual assault. Moreover, on February 27's episode of JTBC's Newsroom, actress Uhm Ji-young came forward to say that she was also sexually harassed by Oh in 2003. As a result, Oh pulled out of his upcoming TV series My Mister. However, all charges against Oh were dismissed following a police investigation.

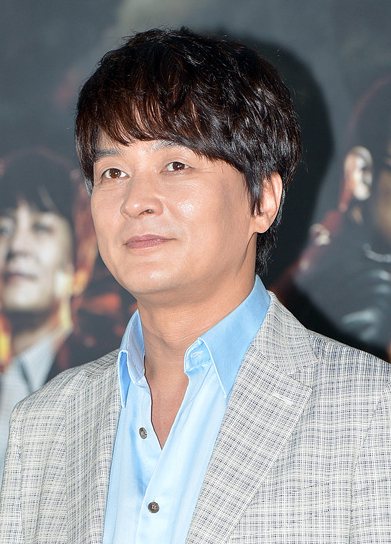
Jo Min-ki, accused by several students of sexual assault, committed suicide following the allegations.

Also on February 22, 2018, students in Cheongju University in Korea divulged the long-time crimes of professor and actor, Jo Min-ki. At first, he denied his crimes and dismissed them as rumors. However, as many other students, including fellow male students accusing him of such exploitation, he admitted to the allegations and apologized publicly. It was confirmed that Jo would be investigated by the police. On March 9, 2018, Jo committed suicide following his scandal, which triggered backlash against the Me Too movement in South Korea.

On February 23, 2018, actress Choi Yul accused actor Cho Jae-hyun of assaulting her sexually. On February 24, Cho acknowledged the accusations.

On February 28, 2018, Ko Un, one of South Korea's most iconic and prominent poets and frequently mentioned Nobel laureate shortlist candidate, was also accused of sexual assault. First reported by the Dong-A Ilbo, poet Choi Young-mi's poem 'The Beast' suggests sexual assault by Ko approximately 20 years ago. The poem did not explicitly mention Ko, but the details of the frequently mentioned "En", which bears similarities to Ko's name – Ko Un – highly matches the accused poet's past. It also confirms the constant rumors and allegations that have been circulating in the past years that Ko has been using his privilege as a prominent poet to gain sexual advances and favors. As a result, Ko was pulled from textbooks and critically denounced by fellow literati alike. Ko also resigned from various posts that he held, including his professorship at KAIST. On March 2, 2018, Ko offered his statement to The Guardian through UK publishers Bloodaxe Books, writing that "he had ‘done nothing which might bring shame on my wife or myself." Despite the denial, more allegations are emerging against Ko.

As more public figures are denounced across society, there has been an increased number of celebrities accused of unwanted sexual advances and activities in the Korean television and cinematic industries, including Choi Il-hwa and Kim Heung-gook.

On March 5, 2018, prominent Democratic Party of Korea presidential contender and former Chungcheongnam-do province Governor Ahn Hee-jung resigned from the governorship and announced his retirement from public service, as his former secretary Kim Ji-eun accused him of multiple cases of sexual assault. She claims that Ahn assaulted her multiple times and said that there is more than one victim inside the Governor's office. Ahn admitted about his sexual activity to his former secretary and apologized, however claimed that it was consensual. He was expelled from his party on the same day.

A female executive of Hyundai resigned due to the movement.

In response to the support of the MeToo movement, Citizen's Action to Support the MeToo Movement was created in early 2018. It is a network of groups that work together to organize events and mass protests to support victims of sexual assault and the enactment of legal and societal reform in regards to the issue. Citizen's Action is responsible for various large scale protests and public speaking events.

== Spain ==
The Spanish-language counterpart is #YoTambién. On October 25, 2017, several Spanish actresses recognized in a report the existence of sexual harassment in Spanish cinema, among them Maru Valdivieso, Aitana Sánchez-Gijón, Carla Hidalgo, and Ana Gracía. Also explaining cases of harassment suffered by them were the actress, scriptwriter and film director Leticia Dolera and Bárbara Rey. The Me Too movement found an echo in the ongoing uproar raised by the La Manada sexual abuse case, resulting in numerous protests across the country.

== Sweden ==
One distinguishing feature of the #MeToo movement in Sweden was how large groups, organized by profession or interests, gathered and mobilized through social networks to raise awareness of the situation in their respective sectors. These sectors could be more loose areas of interest like sports to workplaces such as the university, the media industry, the forest sector, and the church.

Over hundred thousand people participated actively in these groups by contributing with testimonies, supporting survivors, developing petitions, etc., and the participants represented a broad group of women and non-binary, from teens to seniors, and from most parts of the country. A large number of petitions were co-authored and published in the country's major newspapers (33) or public television (7) or smaller industry journals (18) during a period of four months. A total of 78 groups were formed, all of them organizing their own petitions. The petitions had as many as several thousands of signatures and were organized within even larger social media groups. A broad mobilization took place in the form of lists of demands petitioned to the government, action plans by politicians and employers, and a multitude of seminars and educational events organized around the country. Some of the concrete results achieved include increased government funding for women's and girls' shelters, enhanced sex education in schools, training of leader figures on how to handle sexism and sexual harassment and abuse, and the introduction of a sexual consent law. Reporting rates of domestic violence increased after #MeToo, and special efforts to prevent domestic violence were made by the Stockholm Police.

None of the 78 Swedish petitions published any names of perpetrators, and the groups had carefully reviewed testimonies to ensure that no one could be identified, neither victims nor perpetrators. The publishing of names of alleged perpetrators that occurred by Swedish media during the #MeToo wave was made partly by individuals, on their own initiative via social media, and by the news media that picked up these stories. Analyses have also seen that the traditional media gradually took an increasingly active role in investigating and revealing their "own" new cases, with debatable results. According to von Krogh, there were 38 cases of complaints related to the reporting of #MeToo, 24 of which led to serious criticism from PON (Pressens opinionsnämnd).

== Taiwan ==
In 2023 the Taiwanese television series Wave Makers brought increased attention to sexual harassment in Taiwanese society and set of a round of grappling with the issue. Within a month of the shows launch more than 100 public accusations of sexual violence had been leveled. Allegations have been made against figures in the political, economic, and artistic spheres. Taiwan has long had a culture of silence and shame surrounding sexual assault. Taiwanese President Tsai Ing-wen apologized twice for the allegations made against members of her party, the Democratic Progressive Party (DPP) and promised that changes would be made both in party policy and culture. Exiled Chinese human rights activist Teng Biao apologized after allegations against him were made public. Allegations were also made against figures in the entertainment industry, including singer Aaron Yan, hosts Mickey Huang and Chen Hsuan-yo (stage name NONO). Host Blackie Chen was accused of sexual harassment by actress Tina Chou.

== Tunisia ==
Tunisia's #EnaZeda movement (en: #MeToo) began when politician Zouheir Makhlouf was seen allegedly masturbating in a vehicle, whilst following a schoolgirl home. A Facebook group was set up in response to the purported incident, which has over 21,000 members. Najma Kousri, one of the co-founders of the movement, praised the energy from social media as it has gathered huge amounts of testimony and provided support for survivors of sexual violence.

== Turkey ==
Following the murder of a university student named Pınar Gültekin by her boyfriend in July 2020, many celebrities and members of the public condemned domestic and sexual violence against women. A global Instagram hashtag campaign called #ChallengeAccepted was relaunched by a group of Turkish women in wake of her murder and many came out in support for the initiative worldwide. In December 2020, novelist Hasan Ali Toptaş was accused of sexual misconduct by 20 women. Inspired by the Me Too movement, many women later expressed solidarity with the victims. The publication house responsible for publishing his works cut all ties with him, and the city of Mersin revoked the Literature Award that had been given to him.

== United Kingdom ==
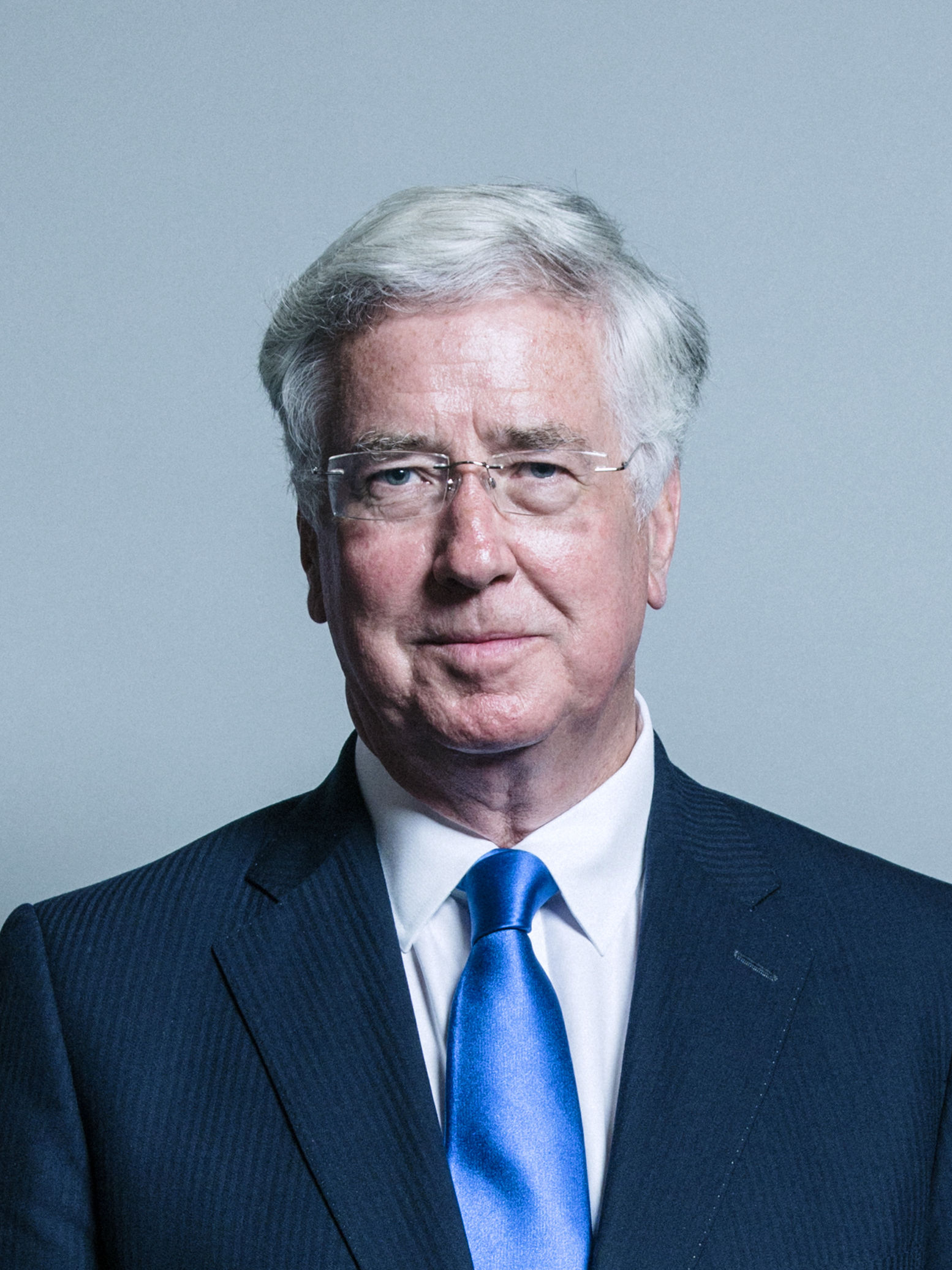
Sir Michael Fallon resigned after being implicated in the 2017 Westminster sexual misconduct allegations.

In the wake of #MeToo, a Labour activist shared her 2011 story of being raped by a senior person in the Labour Party, but being warned that her career could be damaged if she reported the incident. In the UK, the Cabinet Office has launched an investigation in allegations that Parliament member Mark Garnier ordered a secretary to buy sex toys for his wife and mistress.

A series of allegations concerning the involvement of British politicians in cases of sexual harassment and assault arose in October and November 2017, the 2017 Westminster sexual scandals. Allegations were prompted by discussions among junior staff employed in the UK Parliament at Westminster following the Harvey Weinstein sexual abuse allegations in Hollywood earlier in October, and the subsequent rise of Me Too. The journalists Jane Merrick and Kate Maltby made allegations against the Defence Minister Michael Fallon and de facto Deputy Prime Minister Damian Green, respectively. These led to the departures of both from Theresa May's cabinet, the latter after a two-month inquiry that also considered allegations that Green had lied about copious amounts of pornography found on his parliamentary computer. Both Merrick and Maltby cited the #MeToo movement as inspiring their allegations.

Rape statistics (2016–2017) from Rape Crisis Centers across England and Wales state that every year, about 85,000 women and 12,000 men become victims of rape.

In January 2018, Channel 4 News's Cathy Newman conducted an interview with Canadian professor of psychology Jordan Peterson. Newman was criticized for the interview and Rachael Revesz of The Independent wrote that subsequent abuse targeted at Newman was a symbol of a backlash against the MeToo movement.

In the UK, British celebrities such as Emma Watson, Jodie Whittaker, and Keira Knightley came together and donated one million euros to give to victims of sexual harassment.

== Venezuela ==
In April 2021, after Venezuelan vocalist and member of the band Los Colores Alejandro Sojo was denounced for sexual abuse, several allegations of abuse, including against minors, were made public against musicians and artists in Venezuela. The hashtag #YoSíTeCreo (#IBelieveYou) started trending in social media. On April 28, the Venezuelan Public Ministry opened an investigation against Alejandro Sojo; the drummer of the band Tomates Fritos, Tony Maestracci; and writer Willy Mckey after allegations were made against them.
