= Losha =

Losha may refer to:

- Losha, Vologda Oblast, Russia, a village
- Losha, Belarus, a checkpoint on the Belarus–Lithuania border
- LoSHA (List of Sexual Harassers in Academia), a 2017 crowdsourced list of sexual harassers in academia in India
- Peter Losha (died 1374), Albanian clan leader in Epirus
- Losha, a 2012 album by Andrea
