= Gentle Monster (film) =

2026 film by Marie Kreutzer

- German theatrical release poster
- Directed by: Marie Kreutzer
- Written by: Marie Kreutzer
- Produced by: Alexander Glehr; Johanna Scherz
- Starring: Léa Seydoux; Jella Haase; Laurence Rupp; Malo Blanchet; Anton Rubtsov; Nils Strunk; Sylvester Groth; Patrycja Ziółkowska; Regina Fritsch; Catherine Deneuve
- Cinematography: Judith Kaufmann
- Edited by: Ulrike Kofler
- Music by: Camille
- Production companies: Film AG; Komplizen Film; Kazak Productions; Kjellson & Wik; Film I Väst
- Distributed by: Alamode Film (Germany); Ad Vitam (France)
- Release dates: 15 May 2026 (Cannes); 17 September 2026 (Germany); 13 January 2027 (France)
- Running time: 115 minutes
- Countries: Austria; Germany; France
- Languages: German; French; English

Gentle Monster is a 2026 drama film written and directed by Marie Kreutzer. A co-production of Austria, Germany, and France, it stars Léa Seydoux as a successful pianist who must confront her husband's shocking crimes. It also stars Jella Haase, Laurence Rupp, Malo Blanchet, Anton Rubtsov, Nils Strunk, Sylvester Groth, Patrycja Ziółkowska, Regina Fritsch, and Catherine Deneuve in supporting roles.

The film had its world premiere in the main competition of the 79th Cannes Film Festival on 15 May 2026, where it competed for the Palme d'Or. It was theatrically released in Germany by Alamonde Film on 17 September. It received generally positive reviews, with special praise towards Seydoux's performance.

== Plot ==
Lucy Weiss, a successful pianist, moves from Munich to the countryside to support her husband Philip after he suffers burnout, sacrificing her own career in the process. The two have a young son.

Meanwhile, Elsa, a special police investigator from Munich, struggles with the responsibility of caring for her father, who suffers from dementia and has a live-in nurse.

Elsa arrives at Philip and Lucy’s home with a search warrant to seize Philip’s computers and electronic devices under a charge of possession and distribution of child sexual exploitation material.

The live-in nurse for her father tells Elsa he attempts to sexually assault her while she works. Both women reckon with these revealed truths.

== Cast ==
- Léa Seydoux as Lucy Weiss
- Jella Haase as Elsa Kühn
- Laurence Rupp as Philip Weiss
- Malo Blanchet as Johnny
- Anton Rubtsov as Arian
- Nils Strunk as Lukas
- Sylvester Groth as Hermann Kühn
- Patrycja Ziółkowska as Natalia
- Regina Fritsch as Inge Weiss
- Catherine Deneuve as Eloise
- Rainer Doppler as Volker Weiss
- Katharina Lorenz as Maike
- Baran Sönmez as Kevin
- Filipe Repak as Johnny (young)
- Sara Sukarie as Dragana
- Sami Loris as Hannes

== Production ==
=== Development ===
The title Gentle Monster comes from the South Korean brand of sunglasses of the same name that director Marie Kreutzer had lying on the table when she was working on the script for the film, which was originally titled Johnny Maccaroni.

In 2022, Kreutzer released her historical drama film Corsage, which starred Austrian actor Florian Teichtmeister as Emperor Franz Joseph I of Austria. On 13 January 2023, it was reported that Teichtmeister had been charged with possession of child pornography. On 15 January 2023, Kreutzer released a statement saying that she was "sad and angry that a feminist film that more than 300 people from all over Europe worked on for years may be tarnished and damaged by the horrific actions of one person". Kreutzer said she was informed of the rumors about Teichtmeister in Autumn 2021, after the filming for Corsage had wrapped, and when she inquired the actor about these rumors via email, he "convincingly assured us (and others) of their falsity". Teichtmeister initially denied the allegations by claiming it was an act of revenge by his ex-girlfriend, who discovered a pornographic image of a child on Teichtmeister's cell phone and reported it to the police. On 5 September 2023, Teichtmeister pleaded guilty and received a two-year suspended prison sentence from the Vienna Regional Court for possessing and processing over 76,000 files depicting the sexual abuse of children.

Kreutzer's handling of Teichtmeister's case as well as her handling of another case involving an unnamed actor from Corsage—who was accused of abuse and Kreutzer refused to talk to the victims who tried reaching out to her— drew criticism in Austria for contradicting her feminist advocacy and views.

In 2020, Kreutzer read about a pedophile ring on a newspaper, and inspired by that story, she started working on a new film under the working title Johnny Maccaroni, which deals with a topic similar to Teichtmeister's case. The project, for which Kreutzer received funding in 2021, was about a woman who is visited by the police one day because her husband published a photo of their child in a dark web chat group in which men share content about how to abuse a child. Kreutzer told German newspaper Süddeutsche Zeitung in January 2023 that she was unsure whether the film would even come about. The project was later retitled Gentle Monster.

Kreutzer stated that Teichtmeister's case did not make her change the script for Gentle Monster, explaining that the story and characters remained unchanged, although the scandal influenced the atmosphere surrounding the production. In the closing credits for Gentle Monster, Kreutzer thanks "the haters" who criticized her when Teichtmeister's case became known in 2023.

Gentle Monster was produced by Alexander Gehr and Johanna Scherz at the Vienna-based company Film AG, in co-production with Germany's Komplizen Film and France's Kazak Productions, alongside Sweden's Kjellson & Wik and Film i Väst, and the broadcasters ORF (Film/Fernsehabkommen), ZDF and ZDF/Arte. The production was supported by the Austrian Film Institute, German Federal Film Fund, Filmfonds Wien, Eurimages - Council of Europe, FilmFernsehFonds Bayern, Medienboard Berlin-Brandenburg and the Lower Austria Cinestyria Filmcommission and Fonds. It was selected as one of the projects presented at the 2025 Marché du Film Investors Circle initiative, where it was awarded the main ArteKino International Prize.

=== Filming ===
Principal photography began in September 2025. Filming took place in Niederschleinz in Sitzendorf an der Schmida in November 2025. Filming was also planned to take place in Altaussee. German cinematographer Judith Kaufmann shot the production on 16mm and 35mm film. The original score was composed by Camille, while Ulrike Kofler was responsible for the editing.

As Léa Seydoux does not speak German, she learned her dialogue phonetically and occasionally used an earpiece to help with the pronunciation. She received the German-language screenplay after filming had begun and subsequently re-recorded her German dialogue during automated dialogue replacement (ADR) in post-production.

== Release ==
Gentle Monster was selected to compete for the Palme d'Or at the 2026 Cannes Film Festival, where it had its world premiere on 15 May. It was screened in the Summer Screen Programme section of the 32nd Sarajevo Film Festival in August 2026. It had its North American premiere at the 53rd Telluride Film Festival. It was also programmed in the 'Official Section' of the 71st Valladolid International Film Festival.

International sales are handled by Mk2 Films. The film was released theatrically in Germany by Alamode Film on 17 September 2026, before being released in France by Ad Vitam on 13 January 2027.

A week after its Cannes premiere, Netflix was reported to be nearing a deal for distribution rights to the film in North America, the United Kingdom, Australia and New Zealand. It began a limited theatrical release in those territories on 30 October 2026, before streaming on Netflix on 18 November 2026.

== Reception ==
=== Critical response ===
On the review aggregator website Rotten Tomatoes, 73% of 80 critics' reviews are positive, with an average rating of 6.6/10. Metacritic, which uses a weighted average, assigned the film a score of 70 out of 100, based on 27 critics, indicating "generally favorable" reviews.

Peter Bradshaw of The Guardian rated Gentle Monster four out of five stars, considering it a "bleak, pessimistic film with two excellent lead performances". Leslie Felperin of The Hollywood Reporter wrote about Seydoux's performance being "all raw nerves — steely, vulnerable, angry and broken at once". Stephanie Bunbury of Deadline wondered what the film might be "if only the narrative had been as uncluttered as Kreutzer's cleanly defined framing", decrying the result as bafflingly "over-egged", also citing the muddle of languages depending on who speaks to whom.

=== Accolades ===
Award	Date of ceremony	Category	Recipient(s)	Result	Ref.
Cannes Film Festival	23 May 2026	Palme d'Or	Marie Kreutzer	Nominated	
Middleburg Film Festival	18 October 2026	Outstanding Achievement in Acting Award	Léa Seydoux	Honored	
European Film Awards	16 January 2027	Best European Actress	Léa Seydoux	Pending	
