= Marie Kreutzer =

Austrian film director and screenwriter (born 1977)

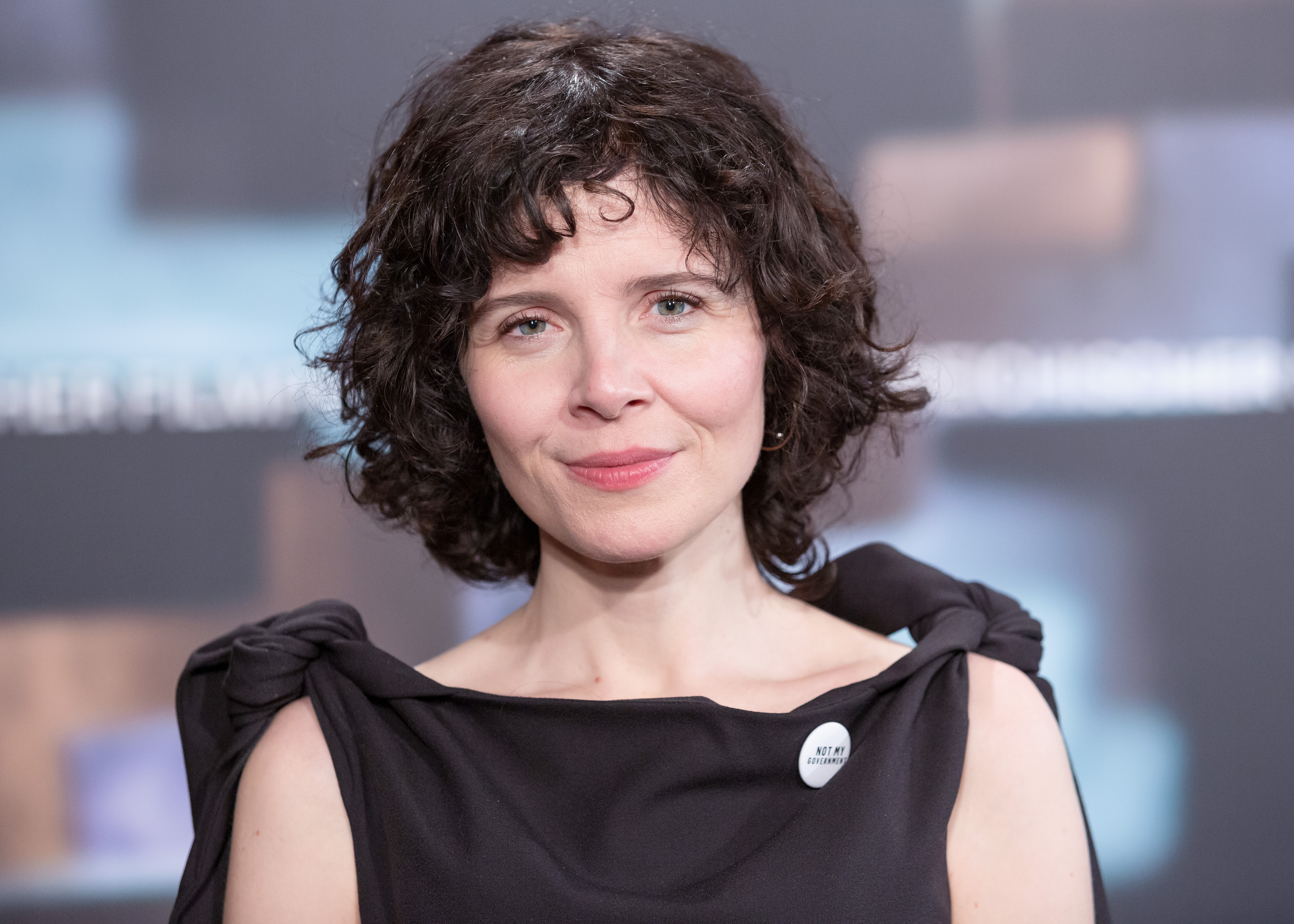
- Kreutzer in 2019
- Born: 25 August 1977 (age 49); Graz, Austria
- Years active: 2011–present
- Spouse: Martin Reiter
- Children: 1

Marie Kreutzer (born 25 August 1977) is an Austrian film director and screenwriter, most known for Corsage (2022).

== Early life and career ==
Kreutzer was born on 25 August 1977 in Graz, Styria, Austria. She is the daughter of the Styrian Green Party politician Ingrid Lechner-Sonnek.

Kreutzer studied at Vienna Film Academy with Walter Wippersberg and later worked as a lecturer at the Vienna Film Academy.

One of Kreutzer's most notable films Corsage focuses on themes of female rebellion in a historic setting, tackling contemporary female issues. She collaborated with her cinematographer Judith Kaufmann to convey her version of the story of Empress Elisabeth of Austria.

Her films have been screened at the Berlin International Film Festival, 70th San Sebastián International Film Festival, 2022 Cannes Film Festival, 2022 Toronto International Film Festival, and 2022 New York Film Festival.

Gentle Monster (2026) had its world premiere in the main competition of the 2026 Cannes Film Festival, where it was nominated for the Palme d'Or. The production won the Cannes Marché du Film Investors Circle Prize in 2025. Starring Léa Seydoux, it follows a wife who must face her husband's horrific crimes.

== Filmography ==
=== Feature film ===
Year	English Title	Original Title	Notes
2011	The Fatherless	Die Vaterlosen	
2015	Gruber Is Leaving	Gruber geht	
2016	We Used to Be Cool	Was hat uns bloß so ruiniert	
2019	The Ground Beneath My Feet	Der Boden unter den Füßen	
2022	Corsage		
2026	Gentle Monster		

=== Television ===
Year	English Title	Notes
2017	Die Notlüge	TV Movie
2022	Vier	TV Movie

== Personal life ==
Kreutzer is a feminist. She is married to production designer Martin Reiter, with whom she has a daughter.

In November 2023, Kreutzer signed a letter supporting the right of the state of Israel to exist and condemning the terrorist attack by Hamas in Israel on 7 October 2023.

== Controversies ==
On 18 June 2022, Austrian film director Katharina Mückstein shared an Instagram Story that read: "Tonight a perpetrator will be on stage and will be applauded. And there is nothing we can do to counter that. It's devastating. I wish all those affected good nerves. #MeToo didn't even start in Austria". No name was given, but the only event of that kind taking place in Austria that night was the premiere of Kreutzer's Corsage in Vienna, which led to speculation that Mückstein was referring to someone who worked in that film. Mückstein later said that she could not name the man due to legal reasons. Mückstein's Instagram story inspired several women to share their own experiences with sexual harassment, sexism, racism, homophobia and abuses of power in the Austrian film and theatre community, which generated a lot of media attention and sparked a new wave of the MeToo movement in Austria.

Kreutzer told Austrian magazine Profil on 2 July 2022 that she learned about the rumors about one of the actors from Corsage "a long time ago" when the project was already underway, but as long as there are only rumors and no court-confirmed evidence, she will never remove or dismiss a staff member from the stage based on rumors, and if there are neither concrete allegations nor a procedure against someone, she would act as a judge if she reacted with consequences. She added; "There are neither concrete allegations nor those affected who have contacted authorities to articulate something concrete there. That's what makes the case so problematic. Even though I've worked very well with him and I like him, I can't put my hand on the fire for him. I do not check the reputation of my performers or my team. What lies in their past I cannot and do not want to research completely. I can only urge that official contact points be included and that all of this is not just carried out among colleagues and like-minded people. You have to take steps, not just talk about it behind closed doors. There were certainly reports about this man, but again they only came from people who were neither affected themselves nor had anything to testify directly. One should stick to the facts, because passing on rumors can seriously damage people; I appreciate Katharina Mückstein extremely for her attitude and her commitment to film politics, we are definitely on the same side. But I would definitely have chosen a different path."

On 13 January 2023, Corsage actor Florian Teichtmeister was charged with possession of child pornography following an investigation that started in 2021. On 15 January 2023, Kreutzer released a statement saying that she was "sad and angry that a feminist film that more than 300 people from all over Europe worked on for years may be tarnished and damaged by the horrific actions of one person". Kreutzer said she was informed of the rumors about Teichtmeister in Autumn 2021, after the filming for Corsage had wrapped, and when she inquired the actor about these rumors via email, he "convincingly assured us (and others) of their falsity", she said. Teichtmeister initially denied the allegations by claiming it was an act of revenge by his ex-girlfriend. The same day, Exxpress reported that another actor from Corsage had been accused of sexual assault by an anonymous insider of the film industry, and that Kreutzer had been informed of that case as well. "As with Teichtmeister, everything should be covered up with this actor so that the film project is not damaged. Again, many people know about the allegations, and again nobody is bringing it to the public", said the whistleblower who tipped off Exxpress about Teichtmeister in June 2022.

Despite the charges against Teichtmeister, Corsage remained as Austria's official submission for the Oscars in the Best International Feature Film category, which caused controversy and divided opinions in the country. However, the film did not get the nomination. In February 2023, Kreutzer said that she did not know Teichtmeister well, that they shot together for two weeks and she did not see him much before either and that "the shock must be much bigger for the people who knew him well". Kreutzer also added, "He has done other films, he is a famous theatre actor in Austria, but we are in a crossfire now, because Corsage has been so successful and everybody was putting this story together with the film. I had to talk about it, even though I am neither responsible nor could I have ever known that. I don't wish for anyone to ever experience this." On 5 September 2023, Teichtmeister pleaded guilty and was sentenced to a two-year suspended prison sentence for possessing and processing child sexual abuse images after further investigation found that about 47,500 of the 76,000 child sexual abuse files he owned show children under the age of 14.

On 20 January 2023, German magazine Der Spiegel reported that at least three women have accused an unnamed actor from Corsage of psychological, physical and sexual violence. Shortly before the Vienna premiere of Corsage in June 2022, the women tried to talk to Kreutzer, who canceled three suggested dates for the meeting claiming she did not have time for it. She later offered to get in touch with one of the women, but it was not accepted. On 22 January 2023, Kreutzer said in a live interview for Austrian TV channel ORF III that the unnamed actor informed her of the allegations against him two days before shooting began. She also made sure to say that this actor is not Manuel Rubey, and that without a name it not only harms Corsage but also his male colleagues in the film if he does not identify himself.

Since 2020, Kreutzer has been working on a new film under the working title Johnny Maccaroni, which deals with a topic similar to Teichtmeister's case. The project, for which Kreutzer received funding in 2021, is about a woman who is visited by the police one day because her husband published a photo of their child in a dark web chat group in which men share content about how to abuse a child. Kreutzer told German newspaper Süddeutsche Zeitung in January 2023 that she was unsure whether the film would even come about after Teichtmeister's case.

At the 2023 Austrian Film Awards, Kreutzer gave a speech in which she defended Corsage's nomination and reported on three alleged #MeToo cases in the Austrian film industry, including a non-consensual oral sex scene. Shortly thereafter, both the director and the actress in question denied the allegations, emphasizing that the filming was consensual and protected, and that they had no contact with Kreutzer. Mückstein criticized Kreutzer's speech, "It is also an abuse of power to bring stories of assault to the public without having discussed it with the people affected. Imagine sitting in the audience at the film awards ceremony and suddenly your story is being told on stage," she said.
