= Florian Teichtmeister child pornography scandal =

Case of possession of child pornography against actor Florian Teichtmeister

Florian Teichtmeister possession of child pornography case
- Court: Vienna Regional Court
- Decided: 5 September 2023
- Verdict: Pleaded guilty
- Charge: Possession of child pornography

Court membership
- Judge sitting: Stefan Apostol

On 13 January 2023, 43-year-old Austrian actor Florian Teichtmeister was charged with possession of child pornography. On 5 September 2023, Teichtmeister pleaded guilty and received a two-year suspended prison sentence from the Vienna Regional Court for possessing and altering images involving the sexual abuse of children, after an investigation that began in August 2021 found that about 47,500 of the 76,000 child sexual abuse files he owned depict children under the age of 14. The court also ruled that Teichtmeister must undergo therapy and regularly submit to drug tests, facing placement in a center for mentally ill offenders if he violates these conditions. Teichtmeister accepted the verdict and refrained from appealing. A forensic psychiatrist diagnosed Teichtmeister's disorder as "severe and persistent", with his cocaine addiction, alcohol consumption, and tendency to cope with stress by viewing child pornography considered as risk factors and a high probability of relapse.

Following the scandal and public outrage, the Austrian government tightened the penalties for acquiring, possessing and passing on or trading in depictions of child sexual abuse, which became known as "Lex Teichtmeister" ("The Teichtmeister Law"). However, it could not be retroactively applied in Teichtmeister's case.

== Background ==
Florian Teichtmeister was born in Vienna, Austria on 4 November 1979. He began his acting career in 2001 and has acted in theatre, film and television. In 2004, he graduated from the Max Reinhardt Seminar drama school, where he became a teacher in 2012. Teichtmeister was a member of the Freemasons of Austria and built a temple on a private property in Langenlois, which he shared with two family members. The engravings on the temple read: "Memento mori" (Latin for "remember [that you have] to die") and "Know yourself, rule yourself and refine yourself". In 2022, Teichtmeister portrayed Emperor Franz Joseph I of Austria in Marie Kreutzer's historical drama film Corsage (2022).

On 18 June 2022, Austrian film director Katharina Mückstein shared an Instagram Story that read: "Tonight a perpetrator will be on stage and will be applauded. And there is nothing we can do to counter that. It's devastating. I wish all those affected good nerves. #MeToo didn't even start in Austria". No name was given, but the only event of that kind taking place in Austria that night was the premiere of Marie Kreutzer's Corsage (2022) in Vienna, which led to speculation that Mückstein was referring to someone who worked in that film. Mückstein later said that she could not name the man due to legal reasons. Mückstein's Instagram story inspired several women to share their own experiences with sexual harassment, sexism, racism, homophobia and abuses of power in the Austrian film and theatre community, which generated a lot of media attention and sparked a new wave of the MeToo movement in Austria.

Corsage's director, Marie Kreutzer, told Austrian magazine Profil on 2 July 2022 that she learned about the rumors about one of the actors from Corsage "a long time ago" when the project was already underway, but as long as there were only rumors and no court-confirmed evidence, she would never remove or dismiss a staff member from the stage based on rumors, and that if there were neither concrete allegations nor a legal case against someone, she would be acting as a judge if she reacted with consequences. "There are neither concrete allegations nor those affected who have contacted authorities to articulate something concrete there. That's what makes the case so problematic. Even though I've worked very well with him and I like him, I can't put my hand on the fire for him. I do not check the reputation of my actors or my team. What lies in their past I cannot and do not want to research completely. I can only urge that official contact points be included and that all of this is not just carried out among colleagues and like-minded people. You have to take steps, not just talk about it behind closed doors. There were certainly reports about this man, but again they only came from people who were neither affected themselves nor had anything to testify directly. One should stick to the facts, because passing on rumors can seriously damage people; I appreciate Katharina Mückstein extremely for her attitude and her commitment to film politics, we are definitely on the same side. But I would definitely have chosen a different path", she said.

On 9 January 2023, Corsage's lead actress and executive producer, Vicky Krieps, was asked on Instagram about the alleged abuser in the film's cast, to which she replied: "So, a feminist film made by two women should be discarded because of the misconduct of a male colleague? (Second question) Who exactly is being harmed by this? But thanks for the mansplaining — always a pleasure."

== Investigation ==
On 10 September 2021, rumors started circulating in the Austrian film and theatre industry when Austria's biggest newspaper, Kronen Zeitung, published an article reporting that "a well-known and award-winning actor" was accused, among other things, of "dangerous threats, drug abuse, beating his partner and possession of child pornography", and referred to him under the fictitious name "Peter P." because the law did not allow his real name to be mentioned in the article. The actor's ex-partner–who wanted to remain anonymous–reported him and filed a complaint in early August 2021, and the article also mentioned that the actor physically attacked and verbally threatened her for years during their relationship. Soon after that, other newspapers such as Der Standard started reporting on the case. Nobody was named at the time, but insiders quickly found out that it was Florian Teichtmeister, according to Austrian magazine Profil, which also stated that Mückstein's Instagram post on 18 June 2022 was meant for a different actor, and Mückstein herself later stated that she was not talking about Teichtmeister.

Teichtmeister continued to work with children while he was being investigated for possession of child pornography. In the summer of 2021, he shot the film Serviam, where he plays the father of a twelve-year-old monastery student. The police files stated that Teichtmeister may also have filmed the legs of a child on the set. In October 2021, Dieter Pochlatko, producer of the film Serviam, was informed by the lawyer of the parents of an underage actress about a photo and was asked to arrange that Teichtmeister no longer approached that actress. Teichtmeister, who portrayed Emperor Franz Joseph I of Austria in Corsage, was also pictured next to child actress Rosa Hajjaj–who portrayed his 9-year-old daughter in Corsage–during the film's premiere in Vienna on 18 June 2022, while investigation was still underway. Director Sebastian Brauneis–who directed Teichtmeister in the film Zauberer (2018)–said that "everyone in the industry knew who it [the rumors of possession of child pornography] was about".

On 3 June 2022, Austrian newspaper Exxpress reported that "a prominent TV commissioner" was being investigated for possession of child pornography, but that Austria's media laws protected him by not allowing his name to be revealed, but it did not protect other possible victims. "TV commissioner" was a reference to Teichtmeister's role in the television series Inspector Rex.

== Charge ==
On 13 January 2023, it was reported that 43-year-old Austrian actor Florian Teichtmeister had been charged with possession of child pornography. In the middle of Summer 2021, Teichtmeister's girlfriend at the time discovered a pornographic image of a child on his cell phone and informed the police. Teichtmeister initially denied the allegations by claiming it was an act of revenge by his former partner.

During a search of Teichtmeister's apartment, police found around 58,000 files with pornographic depictions of minors in a total of 22 data carriers such as laptops, desktops, mobile phones, USB sticks and memory cards collected between February 2008 and August 2021. The investigators found no evidence that Teichtmeister had passed on data, but he is said to have taken photos of minors himself at film locations and subsequently arranged them into collages with speech bubbles with pornographic content. Police also found 110 grams of cocaine on Teichtmeister's mattress, but the prosecutor did not charge the actor for possession of cocaine because there was no evidence that the drug was passed on and it was determined to be for personal use.

Teichtmeister confessed to the authorities throughout the investigation and had been undergoing psychological treatment for two years before he was charged. According to Teichtmeister's lawyer, Michael Rami, his client "fully confesses" and would plead guilty in the forthcoming trial. Teichtmeister's lawyer said that he was accused of a "purely digital crime", meaning that he has not committed any criminal acts against people.

Teichtmeister was a member of Vienna's Burgtheater, whose director, Martin Kušej, said that Teichtmeister had been identified internally as the person concerned in the rumors in 2021, but he "credibly denied" all of the allegations when he was confronted by the management and described the accusations as an act of revenge by his ex-partner. However, according to his lawyer, Teichtmeister confessed from the start and cooperated with the authorities.

A female acquaintance of Teichtmeister (who asked to remain anonymous) said that many people in the industry knew about his violent behavior because he confessed to his colleagues about beating his partner.

== Aftermath ==
Following the charge, Austrian public broadcaster ORF—which co-produced Corsage—stated that it will refrain from producing and broadcasting works with Teichtmeister with immediate effect, and the Burgtheater fired him from their ensemble without notice. The cinema chain Cineplexx also reacted by removing Corsage from its theaters in Austria. Corsage's producers, Johanna Scherz and Alexander Glehr stated; "Today we learned of the charges against Florian Teichtmeister for the first time and as film producers and parents we are deeply shocked. Over the weekend we will decide together with the director of the film, Marie Kreutzer, what this means for the film and we will inform you in good time."

On 14 January 2023, Austria's State Secretary for the Federal Ministry for Art, Culture, Public Service and Sport, Andrea Mayer, announced a detailed examination of the case and commissioned the Bundestheater-Holding to create a comprehensive chronology of the information flows in the group to ensure that all levels were acted correctly and with the necessary care.

On 15 January 2023, Kreutzer released a statement saying that she was "sad and angry that a feminist film that more than 300 people from all over Europe worked on for years may be tarnished and damaged by the horrific actions of one person". Kreutzer said she was informed of the rumors about Teichtmeister in Autumn 2021, after the filming for Corsage had wrapped, and when she inquired the actor about these rumors via email, he "convincingly assured us (and others) of their falsity". Kreutzer later said that it was not possible to reshoot Teichtmeister's scenes with another actor due to budget and organization issues and that it would have breached the contract, "we can't just interrupt a project just because there are suspicions or rumors about an actor", she said. The same day, Exxpress reported that another actor from Corsage had been accused of sexual assault by an anonymous insider from the film industry, and that Kreutzer had been informed of that case as well. "As with Teichtmeister, everything should be covered up with this actor so that the film project is not damaged. Again, many people know about the allegations, and again nobody is bringing it to the public", said the whistleblower who tipped off Exxpress about Teichtmeister in June 2022. In February 2023, Kreutzer told Variety that she did not know Teichtmeister well, that they shot together for two weeks and she did not see him much before either and that "the shock must be much bigger for the people who knew him well". Kreutzer also added, "He has done other films, he is a famous theatre actor in Austria, but we are in a crossfire now, because Corsage has been so successful and everybody was putting this story together with the film. I had to talk about it, even though I am neither responsible nor could I have ever known that. I don't wish for anyone to ever experience this."

The Film & Music Austria (FAMA) decided that Corsage would continue to be Austria's official submission for the Oscars in the Best International Feature Film category despite the charges against Teichtmeister. The film's international distributors such as IFC Films (United States), Picturehouse Distribution (UK and Ireland), Bim Distribuzione (Italy), Ad Vitam (France) and Alamode (Germany) agreed with the statements from Kreutzer and the film's production company that the film should not be overshadowed by the actions of one person, and there was no indication that Corsage would be removed from theaters in any of these countries. The film's international sales handler mK2 declined to comment on the situation.

Austrian newspaper Kronen Zeitung reported that the fact that Corsage remained as Austria's candidate for the Oscars following the charges against Teichtmeister has divided opinions in the country. However, the film did not get the nomination. On 17 January 2023, Corsage's production company, Film AG, issued a statement saying that the underage actors who worked on the film were never left unsupervised, and that there was little or no contact with Teichtmeister behind the camera. The company also said that there was a strict ban on cell phones and photography on the set.

Kreutzer's handling of the case also drew criticism for contradicting her feminist views and criticism of the misogynistic approach to the Johnny Depp vs. Amber Heard case. Der Standard questioned if Kreutzer should have withdrawn her film from Oscar consideration after Teichtmeister's confession or acted differently after the first rumors became known in 2021. In 2020, Kreutzer started working on a new film under the working title Johnny Maccaroni, which deals with a topic similar to Teichtmeister's case. The project, for which Kreutzer received funding in 2021, is about a woman who is visited by the police one day because her husband published a photo of their child in a dark web chat group in which men share content about how to abuse a child. Kreutzer told German newspaper Süddeutsche Zeitung in January 2023 that she was unsure whether the film would even come about. The project was retitled Gentle Monster and will premiere at the 2026 Cannes Film Festival.

Vicky Krieps, who played the wife of Teichtmeister's character in Corsage, Empress Elisabeth of Austria, talked about the case for the first time in an interview with Variety on 19 February 2023, saying, "It's the problem of a man who needs probably treatment and help and also, it needs to be judged by the law. To me, I don't even see in what way this could be controversial to the movie. It was a shock to know that someone I was so close to was apparently someone I didn't know. This was more shocking, and shaking me in a way thinking about humans and society and how we think we know each other, but we don't. In that way I thought about it a lot but I never understood what it has to do with the movie. He's not playing Sisi and the movie is not about manliness. In my eyes it is not really connected."

Following the scandal and public outrage, the Austrian government tightened the penalties for acquiring, possessing and passing on or trading in depictions of child sexual abuse, which became known as "Lex Teichtmeister" ("The Teichtmeister Law") and also included the mandatory implementation of protection concepts in schools, the tightening of sexual criminal law and the extension of the ban on activities, with criminals facing up to five years in prison for possession of photos or videos with minors (up to the age of 13), a maximum sentence of one year in prison for initiating sexual contact, and up to ten years in prison for child abuse. However, they could not be retroactively applied in Teichtmeister's case.

On 14 July 2023, the Grand Master of the Grand Lodge of Austria announced that Teichtmeister was expelled from the Freemasons of Austria after the charges against him became public.

In April 2025, two years after Austrian cinema chains and TV channels refused to broadcast Teichtmeister's works, Kronen Zeitung reported that Netflix will stream a film and a series starring Teichtmeister, while the ORF still does not broadcast productions with him.

== Trial and conviction ==
Teichtmeister's trial was originally scheduled to begin on 8 February 2023 at the Vienna Criminal Court, with Teichtmeister facing up to two years in prison, but it was canceled at short notice due to Teichtmeister's illness. In June 2023, it was reported that Teichtmeister was no longer ill but no date had been set for the trial, and he was not arrested either. Experts told the Austrian press that they were expecting a conditional sentence based on his confession instead of prison.

On 5 September 2023, Teichtmeister pleaded guilty and the Vienna Regional Court sentenced him to a two-year suspended prison sentence for possessing and processing/altering child sexual abuse images after further investigation found that about 47,500 of the 76,000 child sexual abuse files he owned show children under the age of 14. He also confessed in court that he was never sober and sometimes used three grams of cocaine per day for months, claiming that it had contributed to his "violent fantasies". The court also ruled that Teichtmeister must undergo therapy and regularly submit to drug tests, facing placement in a center for mentally ill offenders if he violates these conditions. Teichtmeister accepted the verdict and refrained from appealing. A small group of people protested next to the court during the trial with a gallows dummy under the motto "Hands off our children", to which the presiding judge, Stefan Apostol, responded; "We don't follow the call of the street here."

A forensic psychiatrist diagnosed Teichtmeister's disorder as "severe and persistent", with his cocaine addiction, alcohol consumption, and tendency to cope with stress by viewing child pornography considered as risk factors and a high probability of relapse. German newspaper Süddeutsche Zeitung described Teichtmeister's texts on the images of children–which were read out during the trial–as "extremely brutal rape fantasies," and the public prosecutor's office also classified his texts as "pedo-sadistic."

Teichtmeister's verdict set a precedent, and in March 2024, another man accused of possession of child pornography in Austria begged not to be sent to prison inspired by Teichtmeister's case.

== Other legal actions ==
The Burgtheater also sued Teichtmeister for damages amounting to almost €100,000, claiming costs for canceled performances, reprinted program booklets, and legal fees. Teichtmeister rejected some of the claims, arguing that performances could have been recast instead of being canceled entirely. The Vienna Labor and Social Court awarded the Burgtheater approximately €20,000, claiming that two-thirds of the damages were caused by the Burgtheater. Teichtmeister was also awarded €6,000 in legal costs. In February 2025, the Vienna Higher Regional Court upheld an appeal by the Burgtheater and increased the amount of damages to €58,725.

In October 2025, Teichtmeister was observed consuming cocaine by Munich police during Oktoberfest, which he had attended with his fiancée, to whom he became engaged in September 2025 following a two-year relationship that began after his conviction in 2023. This was in violation of his probation conditions, which prohibited him from consuming addictive substances for five years. Teichtmeister was then detained in a forensic treatment facility. The duration of his detention was subjected to an evaluation by a psychiatric expert. At the end of January 2026, he was released from custody under conditions.

== In media ==
Teichtmeister's case inspired Austrian writer Werner Reichel to write the book Das Netzwerk der Kinderschänder: Politik, Macht und Pädophilie in Österreich ("The Network of Child Abusers: Politics, Power and Pedophilia in Austria"), published in 2024, in which he discusses power, pedophilia and cover-up, and the negligent handling of cases of child sexual abuse by the media and the judiciary in Austria. Reichel said that the suffering of Teichtmeister's victims was largely ignored even at the trial, and that a lack of a deep investigation into the network of Teichtmeister's co-workers and employers may be due to celebrity protection and political consideration.

== See also ==
- Child pornography
- Law of Austria
- Legality of child pornography
- Corsage (film)#Abuse allegations and #MeToo Movement in Austria
- International response to the MeToo movement#Austria
