= Losha, Vologda Oblast =

Losha Лоша
- Village
- Location within Vologda Oblast Location within Russia
- Coordinates: 58°38′N 37°29′E
- Country: Russia
- Region: Vologda Oblast
- District: Cherepovetsky District
- Time zone: UTC+3:00

Losha (Russian: Лоша) is a rural locality (a village) in Yagnitskoye Rural Settlement, Cherepovetsky District, Vologda Oblast, Russia. The population was 2 as of 2002.

== Geography ==
Losha is located 117 km (73 mi) southwest of Cherepovets (the district's administrative centre) by road. Ploskovo is the nearest rural locality.
