= Corsage (film) =

2022 film by Marie Kreutzer

- Theatrical release poster
- Directed by: Marie Kreutzer
- Written by: Marie Kreutzer
- Produced by: Alexander Glehr; Johanna Scherz
- Starring: Vicky Krieps; Florian Teichtmeister; Katharina Lorenz; Jeanne Werner; Alma Hasun; Manuel Rubey; Finnegan Oldfield; Aaron Friesz; Rosa Hajjaj; Lilly Marie Tschörtner; Colin Morgan
- Cinematography: Judith Kaufmann
- Edited by: Ulrike Kofler
- Music by: Camille
- Production companies: Film AG; Samsa Film; Komplizen Film; Kazak Productions; ORF Film; Fernseh-Abkommen; ZDF; Arte; Arte France Cinéma
- Distributed by: Panda Lichtspiele Filmverleih (Austria); Alamode Film (Germany); Ad Vitam Distribution (France)
- Release dates: 20 May 2022 (Cannes); 7 July 2022 (Austria and Germany); 14 December 2022 (France)
- Running time: 112 minutes
- Countries: Austria; Germany; Luxembourg; France
- Languages: German; French; English; Hungarian
- Budget: €7.5 million (US$8.1 million)
- Box office: $3.1 million

Corsage is a 2022 historical drama film written and directed by Marie Kreutzer. It stars Vicky Krieps, Florian Teichtmeister, Katharina Lorenz, Jeanne Werner, Alma Hasun, Manuel Rubey, Finnegan Oldfield, Aaron Friesz, Rosa Hajjaj, Lilly Marie Tschörtner, and Colin Morgan. The film is an international co-production between Austria, Germany, Luxembourg, and France.

The film debuted in the Un Certain Regard section of the Cannes Film Festival on 20 May 2022. It was released in Austria and Germany on 7 July 2022, and in France on 14 December 2022.

== Plot ==
Empress Elisabeth of Austria is semi-estranged from her philandering husband Emperor Franz Joseph, with whom she unhappily celebrates her 40th birthday. Frustrated with her loneliness and fading beauty, Elisabeth tries to reassert agency by obsessively maintaining her weight. Elisabeth's youngest daughter Marie Valerie falls ill after Elisabeth takes her for a nighttime ride, causing discord between Franz and Elisabeth.

Rudolf joins Elisabeth and Marie Valerie on a trip, where Elisabeth amuses herself with a flirtation with her riding instructor Bay and a jaunt with aspiring filmmaker Louis Le Prince. After Bay rejects her, realizing her vanity, Elisabeth returns to Vienna and attempts to physically reconnect with Franz but fails; she later hears rumors of his affair with a much younger woman. After Rudolf leaves for Prague to begin his military education, Elisabeth expresses a desire to depart with Valerie, angering Franz. The argument causes Elisabeth to jump out the window, surviving with minor injuries.

She spends time with her cousin and kindred spirit Ludwig II in their native Bavaria, but the visit fails to significantly lift her spirits, and she is further frustrated by her inability to affect the war effort in Sarajevo. At her behest, Franz finances an extension of the mental ward she frequently visits.

Elisabeth is prescribed heroin in an attempt to ease her health. She impulsively cuts her hair and feels freer. She has her lady-in-waiting, Marie Festetics, stand-in for her in public, and commands Marie to restrict her diet. She invites Franz's rumored mistress to entertain the emperor regularly. Elisabeth takes a trip to Ancona with her ladies, including a veiled Marie, during which Elisabeth jumps into the sea.

== Cast ==
- Vicky Krieps as Empress Elisabeth of Austria
- Florian Teichtmeister as Emperor Franz Joseph I of Austria
- Katharina Lorenz as Countess Marie Festetics
- Jeanne Werner as Ida Ferenczy
- Alma Hasun as Fanny Feifalik
- Manuel Rubey as King Ludwig II of Bavaria
- Finnegan Oldfield as Louis Le Prince
- Aaron Friesz as Rudolf
- Rosa Hajjaj as Valerie
- Lilly Marie Tschörtner as Queen Maria Sophie of Two Sicilies
- Colin Morgan as George "Bay" Middleton
- Alice Prosser as Anna Nahowski

== Production ==
In February 2021, it was announced Vicky Krieps, Florian Teichtmeister, Manuel Rubey, and Katharina Lorenz had joined the cast of the film, with Marie Kreutzer directing from a screenplay she wrote. Krieps is also the film's executive producer.

The film is a co-production between Austria's Film AG Produktion, Germany's Komplizen Film, Luxembourg's Samsa Film, and France's Kazak Productions. With a €7,5 million budget ($8.1 million), the production is 58.62% Austrian, 21.34% Luxembourgish, 10.03% German, and 10.01% French. The film was financially backed by Eurimages, the Austrian Film Fund, Luxembourg Film Fund, FISA – Film Industry Support Austria, the Vienna Film Fund and FilmFernsehFonds Bavaria.

Principal photography began on 2 March 2021, and wrapped on 7 July 2021. Filming took place in Austria, Luxembourg, France, Belgium and Italy; locations included the Hofburg and Schönbrunn Palace in Vienna, and Eckartsau Castle in Lower Austria.

When asked how much of the film was real and how much was fiction, Corsage's director and screenwriter Marie Kreutzer said she could not tell in percent because she could not even remember exactly, but that some parts were made up, such as the ending, and also the meeting between Elisabeth and Louis Le Prince, which did not happen in real life.

Although Corsage has been compared to Sofia Coppola's Marie Antoinette (2006) due to the use of modern music and anachronisms, director Marie Kreutzer said she does not like Coppola's film and does not want people to think of it.

== Abuse allegations and #MeToo Movement in Austria ==
On 18 June 2022, Austrian director Katharina Mückstein shared an Instagram Story that read: "Tonight a perpetrator will be on stage and will be applauded. And there is nothing we can do to counter that. It's devastating. I wish all those affected good nerves. #MeToo didn't even start in Austria". No name was given, but the only event of that kind taking place in Austria that night was the premiere of Corsage in Vienna, which led to speculation that Mückstein was referring to someone who worked in this film. Mückstein later said that she could not name the man for legal reasons.

Mückstein's Instagram story inspired several women to share their own experiences with sexual harassment, sexism, racism, homophobia and abuses of power in the Austrian film and theatre community, which generated a lot of media attention and sparked a new wave of the MeToo movement in Austria. Corsage's director, Marie Kreutzer, told Austrian magazine Profil on 2 July 2022 that she learned about the rumors about one of the actors from Corsage "a long time ago" when the project was already underway, but as long as there are only rumors and no court-confirmed evidence, she will never remove or dismiss a staff member from the stage based on rumors, and if there are neither concrete allegations nor a procedure against someone, she would act as a judge if she reacted with consequences. "There are neither concrete allegations nor those affected who have contacted authorities to articulate something concrete there. That's what makes the case so problematic. Even though I've worked very well with him and I like him, I can't put my hand on the fire for him. I do not check the reputation of my performers or my team. What lies in their past I cannot and do not want to research completely. I can only urge that official contact points be included and that all of this is not just carried out among colleagues and like-minded people. You have to take steps, not just talk about it behind closed doors. There were certainly reports about this man, but again they only came from people who were neither affected themselves nor had anything to testify directly. One should stick to the facts, because passing on rumors can seriously damage people; I appreciate Katharina Mückstein extremely for her attitude and her commitment to film politics, we are definitely on the same side. But I would definitely have chosen a different path", she said.

On 9 January 2023, lead actress and executive producer Vicky Krieps was asked about the alleged abuser in the cast of Corsage on Instagram, to which she replied: "So, a feminist film made by two women should be discarded because of the misconduct of a male colleague? (Second question) Who exactly is being harmed by this? But thanks for the mansplaining – always a pleasure."

=== Florian Teichtmeister ===
On 13 January 2023, it was reported that Austrian actor Florian Teichtmeister (who portrayed Emperor Franz Joseph I of Austria in Corsage) has been charged with possession of child pornography. In the middle of Summer 2021, Teichtmeister's girlfriend at the time discovered a pornographic image of a child on his cell phone and informed the police. During a search of Teichtmeister's apartment, police found around 58,000 files with pornographic depictions of minors in a total of 22 data carriers such as laptops, desktops, mobile phones, USB sticks and memory cards collected between February 2008 and August 2021. The investigators found no evidence that Teichtmeister had passed on data, but he is said to have taken photos of minors himself at film locations and subsequently arranged them into collages with speech bubbles with pornographic content.

Teichtmeister confessed to the authorities throughout the investigation and had been undergoing psychological treatment for two years before he was charged. According to Teichtmeister's lawyer, Michael Rami, his client "fully confesses" and would plead guilty in the forthcoming trial. Teichtmeister's lawyer said that he was accused of a "purely digital crime", meaning that he has not committed any criminal acts against people. Teichtmeister continued to work with children while he was being investigated for possession of child pornography, he was even pictured next to child actress Rosa Hajjaj–who portrayed his 9-year-old daughter in Corsage–during the film's premiere in Vienna with the director and the cast on 18 June 2022, while investigation was still underway. According to director Sebastian Brauneis–who directed Teichtmeister in the film Zauberer (2018)–"everyone in the industry knew who it [the rumors of possession of child pornography] was about".

The trial was originally scheduled to begin on 8 February 2023 at the Vienna Criminal Court, with Teichtmeister facing up to two years in prison, but it was canceled at short notice due to Teichtmeister's illness. In June 2023, it was reported that Teichtmeister was no longer ill but no date had been set for the trial, and he had not been arrested either. Experts expected a conditional sentence based on his confession instead of prison. Following the scandal and public outrage, Austrian politicians tightened the penalties for acquiring, possessing and passing on or trading in depictions of abuse. However, they could no longer be applied in Teichtmeister's case. On 5 September 2023, Teichtmeister pleaded guilty and the Vienna state court sentenced him to a two-year suspended prison sentence after further investigation found that about 47,500 of the 76,000 child sexual abuse files he owned show children under the age of 14.

Following the charges, Austrian public broadcaster ORF—which co-produced Corsage—stated that it will refrain from producing and broadcasting works with Teichtmeister with immediate effect. The cinema chain Cineplexx also reacted by removing Corsage from its theaters in Austria. Corsage's producers, Johanna Scherz and Alexander Glehr stated; "Today we learned of the charges against Florian Teichtmeister for the first time and as film producers and parents we are deeply shocked. Over the weekend we will decide together with the director of the film, Marie Kreutzer, what this means for the film and we will inform you in good time." On 15 January 2023, Kreutzer released a statement saying that she was "sad and angry that a feminist film that more than 300 people from all over Europe worked on for years may be tarnished and damaged by the horrific actions of one person". Kreutzer said she was informed of the rumors about Teichtmeister in Autumn 2021, after the filming for Corsage had wrapped, and when she inquired the actor about these rumors via email, he "convincingly assured us (and others) of their falsity". Kreutzer later said that it was not possible to reshoot Teichtmeister's scenes with another actor due to budget and organization issues and that it would have breached the contract, "we can't just interrupt a project just because there are suspicions or rumors about an actor", she said.

Rumors about Teichtmeister had been circulating in the Austrian press since September 2021, when daily newspaper Der Standard published an article reporting that there was talk of a "successful local theater and film actor who is said to be hoarding child pornographic material". The actor's ex-partner reported him, and he was said to have physically attacked and verbally threatened her during their relationship. Nobody was named at the time, but insiders quickly found out that it was Teichtmeister, according to Austrian magazine Profil, which also stated that Katharina Mückstein's Instagram post on 18 June 2022 was meant for a different actor, and Mückstein herself later stated that she was not talking about Teichtmeister. Teichtmeister initially denied the allegations by claiming it was an act of revenge by his former partner.

The Film & Music Austria (FAMA) decided that Corsage would continue to be Austria's official submission for the Oscars in the International Feature Film category despite the charges against Teichtmeister. The film's international distributors such as IFC Films (United States), Picturehouse Distribution (UK and Ireland), Bim Distribuzione (Italy), Ad Vitam (France) and Alamode (Germany) agreed with the statements from Kreutzer and the film's production company that the film should not be overshadowed by the actions of one person, and there was no indication that Corsage would be removed from theaters in any of these countries. The film's international sales handler mK2 declined to comment on the situation.

Kronen Zeitung reported that the fact that Corsage remained as Austria's candidate for the Oscars following the charges against Teichtmeister has divided opinions in the country. On 17 January 2023, Corsage's production company, Film AG, issued a statement saying that the underage actors who worked on the film were never left unsupervised and that there was little or no contact with Teichtmeister behind the camera. The company also said that there was a strict ban on cell phones and photography on the set. In February 2023, Kreutzer said that she did not know Teichtmeister well, that they shot together for two weeks and she did not see him much before either and that "the shock must be much bigger for the people who knew him well". Kreutzer also added, "He has done other films, he is a famous theatre actor in Austria, but we are in a crossfire now, because Corsage has been so successful and everybody was putting this story together with the film. I had to talk about it, even though I am neither responsible nor could I have ever known that. I don't wish for anyone to ever experience this."

Since 2020, Kreutzer has been working on a new film under the working title Johnny Maccaroni, which deals with a topic similar to Teichtmeister's case. The project, for which Kreutzer received funding in 2021, is about a woman who is visited by the police one day because her husband published a photo of their child in a dark web chat group in which men share content about how to abuse a child. Kreutzer told German newspaper Süddeutsche Zeitung in January 2023 that she was unsure whether the film would even come about.

Krieps, who played the wife of Teichtmeister's character in Corsage, talked about the case for the first time in an interview with Variety on 19 February 2023, saying, "It's the problem of a man who needs probably treatment and help and also, it needs to be judged by the law. To me, I don't even see in what way this could be controversial to the movie. It was a shock to know that someone I was so close to was apparently someone I didn't know. This was more shocking, and shaking me in a way thinking about humans and society and how we think we know each other, but we don't. In that way I thought about it a lot but I never understood what it has to do with the movie. He's not playing Sisi and the movie is not about manliness. In my eyes it is not really connected."

=== Further allegations ===
Austrian newspaper Exxpress reported on 15 January 2023 that another actor from Corsage has been accused of sexual assault by an anonymous insider of the film industry. "As with Teichtmeister, everything should be covered up with this actor so that the film project is not damaged. Again, many people know about the allegations, and again nobody is bringing it to the public", reported the whistleblower who tipped off Exxpress in June 2022 about the allegations against Teichtmeister. "In the industry it is known that there are also serious allegations against another Austrian actor. During the shooting of Corsage there were several serious sexual assaults on the film set. And the scene is also silent about that again", the insider said. Exxpress also reported that the film's director Marie Kreutzer had been informed about these cases, and that the name of the actor is known to the newspaper, but Austria's media law does not allow him to be named.

Der Standard also reported that there are allegations against another actor from the film. Kreutzer confirmed to Der Standard on 16 January 2023 that her response to Mückstein's post in July 2022 was not about Teichtmeister. Der Standard wrote that Kreutzer had several conversations with the second actor after the #MeToo rumors circulating about him were repeatedly brought to her around the start of the shooting for Corsage, and the actor always claimed that the rumors were unfounded. Kreutzer then recommended that he turn to "We_do", the contact and advice center for the film and television industry of Austria. According to reports, the actor followed her advice and is said to have deposited his willingness to talk at "We_do" if he was reported by those affected. The following day, the "We_do" issued a statement saying the article made it look like they are a relief for the people who caused the abuse, which they are not, and that it can even be part of an overall strategy of manipulation. They clarified that they work for the people who were affected. If they want support in a conversation with the person who caused the problem, they will be happy to do it.

On 17 January 2023, one of Corsage's production companies, Film AG, issued a statement on the second actor accused of sexual assault: "Of course we take such allegations seriously, even if they have nothing to do with the production of the film Corsage directly. Director Marie Kreutzer commented in detail on this last summer. Back then, she tried to get to the bottom of the rumors with both the actor and many whistleblowers. We had another detailed conversation with the actor yesterday. This conversation didn't bring us any new information either", the statement said. The actor's lawyer told Austrian newspaper Kleine Zeitung that there is no investigation against him. On 20 January 2023, the actor issued a statement denying the allegations through his lawyer and asked not to be named further.

On 20 January 2023, German magazine Der Spiegel reported that at least three women have accused the unnamed actor of psychological, physical and sexual violence. The producers of Corsage sent a statement to Der Spiegel saying, "We trusted him, we shouldn't have done that from today's perspective. It is the right of those affected to decide whether an action is an assault and how they want to deal with it." Shortly before the Vienna premiere of Corsage in June 2022, the women tried to talk to Kreutzer, who canceled three suggested dates for the meeting claiming she did not have time for it. She later offered to get in touch with one of the women, but it was not accepted. On 22 January 2023, Kreutzer said in a live interview for Austrian TV channel ORF III that the unnamed actor informed her of the allegations against him two days before shooting began, "That was shortly before shooting started, that's not the moment when you quickly pull someone else out of a hat. Especially when it's about something so vague," she said. In the same interview, Kreutzer made sure to say that this actor is not Manuel Rubey, and that without a name it not only harms Corsage but also his male colleagues in the film if he does not identify himself.

== Release ==
The film had its world premiere in the Un Certain Regard section of the Cannes Film Festival on 20 May 2022. Shortly thereafter, IFC Films acquired U.S. distribution rights to the film while the rights for the United Kingdom and the Republic of Ireland went to Picturehouse Entertainment. It was also screened at the Toronto International Film Festival in September 2022 and at the 60th New York Film Festival and at the 17th Rome Film Festival in the following month.

It was released in Austria and Germany on 7 July 2022, by Panda Lichtspiele Filmverleih and Alamode Film, respectively. and it was released in the United States on 23 December 2022, in the United Kingdom on 26 December 2022, and in France on 14 December 2022 by Ad Vitam Distribution. It was also invited to the 27th Lima Film Festival in the Acclaimed section, where it was screened on 10 August 2023.

== Reception ==
=== Critical reception ===
On the review aggregator website Rotten Tomatoes, 85% of 137 critics' reviews are positive, with an average rating of 7.3/10. The website's consensus reads, "Corsage puts a refreshingly irreverent spin on period biopic formulas, further elevated by Vicky Krieps' terrific turn in the central role". Metacritic assigned the film a weighted average score of 76 out of 100 based on 35 critics' reviews, indicating "generally favorable reviews".

=== Box office ===
The film grossed US$3.1 million worldwide. It was the third most-watched Austrian film of 2022 and sold a total of 57,394 tickets in Austria, 47,501 tickets in Germany, 60,249 in France, 8,607 in Luxembourg, and a total of 348,948 tickets sold in Europe.

=== Accolades ===
Award	Date of ceremony	Category	Recipient(s)	Result	Ref.
Cannes Film Festival	27 May 2022	Un Certain Regard Award	Marie Kreutzer	Nominated	
Cannes Film Festival	27 May 2022	Un Certain Regard Best Performance Prize	Vicky Krieps	Won	
Munich International Film Festival	2 July 2022	Best International Film	Corsage	Nominated	
Sarajevo Film Festival	19 August 2022	Best Film	Corsage	Nominated	
Sarajevo Film Festival	19 August 2022	Best Actress	Vicky Krieps	Won	
Miskolc International Film Festival	17 September 2022	Emeric Pressburger Prize	Corsage	Nominated	
San Sebastián International Film Festival	24 September 2022	RTVE-Another Look Award Special Mention	Corsage	Won	
London Film Festival	16 October 2022	Best Film	Corsage	Won	
Film Fest Ghent	22 October 2022	Best Film	Corsage	Nominated	
Chicago International Film Festival	21 October 2022	Gold Hugo	Corsage	Nominated	
Chicago International Film Festival	21 October 2022	Siver Hugo for Best Performance	Vicky Krieps	Won	
Montclair Film Festival	30 October 2022	Fiction Feature	Corsage	Nominated	
Montclair Film Festival	30 October 2022	Special Jury Prize	Corsage	Won	
Montclair Film Festival	30 October 2022	Special Jury Prize for Performance	Vicky Krieps	Won	
Gotham Independent Film Awards	28 November 2022	Best International Feature	Corsage	Nominated	
European Film Awards	10 December 2022	Best Film	Corsage	Nominated	
European Film Awards	10 December 2022	Best Director	Marie Kreutzer	Nominated	
European Film Awards	10 December 2022	Best Actress	Vicky Krieps	Won	
Chicago Film Critics Association	14 December 2022	Best Costume Design	Monika Buttinger	Nominated	
Alliance of Women Film Journalists	5 January 2023	Best Actress	Vicky Krieps	Nominated	
Alliance of Women Film Journalists	5 January 2023	Best Woman Director	Marie Kreutzer	Nominated	
London Film Critics' Circle	5 February 2023	Actress of the Year	Vicky Krieps	Nominated	
Satellite Awards	11 February 2023	Best Actress in a Motion Picture – Drama	Vicky Krieps	Nominated	
Satellite Awards	11 February 2023	Best Motion Picture – International	Corsage	Nominated	
British Academy Film Awards	19 February 2023	Best Film Not in the English Language	Marie Kreutzer	Nominated	
Independent Spirit Awards	4 March 2023	Best International Film	Corsage	Nominated	
Golden Trailer Awards	29 June 2023	Best Foreign Trailer	"Duty" (GrandSon)	Nominated	
Golden Trailer Awards	29 June 2023	Best BTS/EPK for a Feature Film (Under 2 minutes)	"Corset" (Jump Cut)	Won	
Golden Trailer Awards	29 June 2023	Best Drama Poster	Corsage (GrandSon Creative)	Nominated	
Golden Trailer Awards	29 June 2023	Best Teaser Poster	Corsage (GrandSon Creative)	Nominated	

== See also ==
- List of submissions to the 95th Academy Awards for Best International Feature Film
- List of Austrian submissions for the Academy Award for Best International Feature Film
