= Babae Ako movement =

Women's rights movement

#BabaeAko
- Formation: May 20, 2018; 8 years ago
- Founder: Zerna Bernardo; Jean Enriquez; Mae Paner; Inday Espina-Varona
- Type: Political movement / Women's rights advocacy group
- Region served: Philippines
- Methods: Hashtag activism, mass demonstration
- Fields: Women's rights
- Official language: Filipino

The Babae Ako movement (transl. I'm a Woman movement; stylized as #BabaeAko) is a women's rights movement in the Philippines. It was launched on May 20, 2018 as a social media campaign when twelve women of various political persuasions got together to launch a public campaign calling out what they perceived as anti-women remarks made by President Rodrigo Duterte. The social media campaign eventually took the form of live protests later held under the movement. The founders of the movement were included among the "25 Most Influential People on the Internet in 2018" list by Time.

== History ==
The Babae Ako movement started out as an online campaign in May 2018. It was a response to President Rodrigo Duterte's various remarks which was seen as misogynist by critics. Among these statements was President Duterte's ruling out any female successor to outgoing Ombudsman Conchita Carpio-Morales who was to retire on July 26, 2018, and said that he wanted a person with integrity but preferably not a woman to succeed Maria Lourdes Sereno, who was removed from her post in a quo warranto petition.

Days after Duterte made the remark on the Ombudsman post, Babae Ako convenors launched the social media campaign which also drew in the participation of former Social Welfare Secretary Judy Taguiwalo.

Convenors of Babae Ako include journalist Inday Espina-Varona, actress Mae Paner, Socorro Reyes of Baigani, Edna Aquino of LODI, Coalition Against Trafficking in Women chief for Asia Pacific Jean Enriquez, Zena Bernardo of Bahay Amihan, lawyer Susan Villanueva, Annelle Gumihid-Sabanal of Christians for Life and Democracy (CLAD), Melba Magay and Fhabi Fajardo of the Institute for Studies in Asian Church and Culture (ISACC), Sharon Cabusao-Silva of Voices of Women for Justice and Peace (VoWJP), Gert Ranjo-Libang of the Gabriela Women's Party and Marielle Rugas of Girls for Peace. The movement was a concept originally proposed by Bernardo.

In response to President Rodrigo Duterte kissing a married Filipino woman in South Korea amidst applause from supporters on June 3, 2018, Babae Ako mobilized its supporters and encouraged women to post video messages addressed to Duterte followed by a pledge of "lalaban ako" (transl. I will fight back).

The online campaign later led to in-person activism, as demonstrators marching under the Babae Ako movement organized a protest during Independence Day on June 12, 2018. The protest was attended by 1,000 to 1,500 people, including men.

== Political positions ==
=== Women in politics ===
The Babae Ako movement has condemned President Rodrigo Duterte's remarks on his preference in hiring a successor to former Chief Justice Maria Lourdes Sereno, who was removed from her post in a quo warranto petition. He has said that Sereno's successor should have integrity, and be "especially not a woman."

== Reception ==
Daughter of President Rodrigo Duterte, Sara Duterte said that the movement is doomed to failure because she believes her father is not a misogynist. A few weeks later, the people behind the Babae Ako movement were named as among the "25 Most Influential People on the Internet in 2018" by Time.

== See also ==
- Women's rights in the Philippines
