= Judith Kaufmann =

German cinematographer

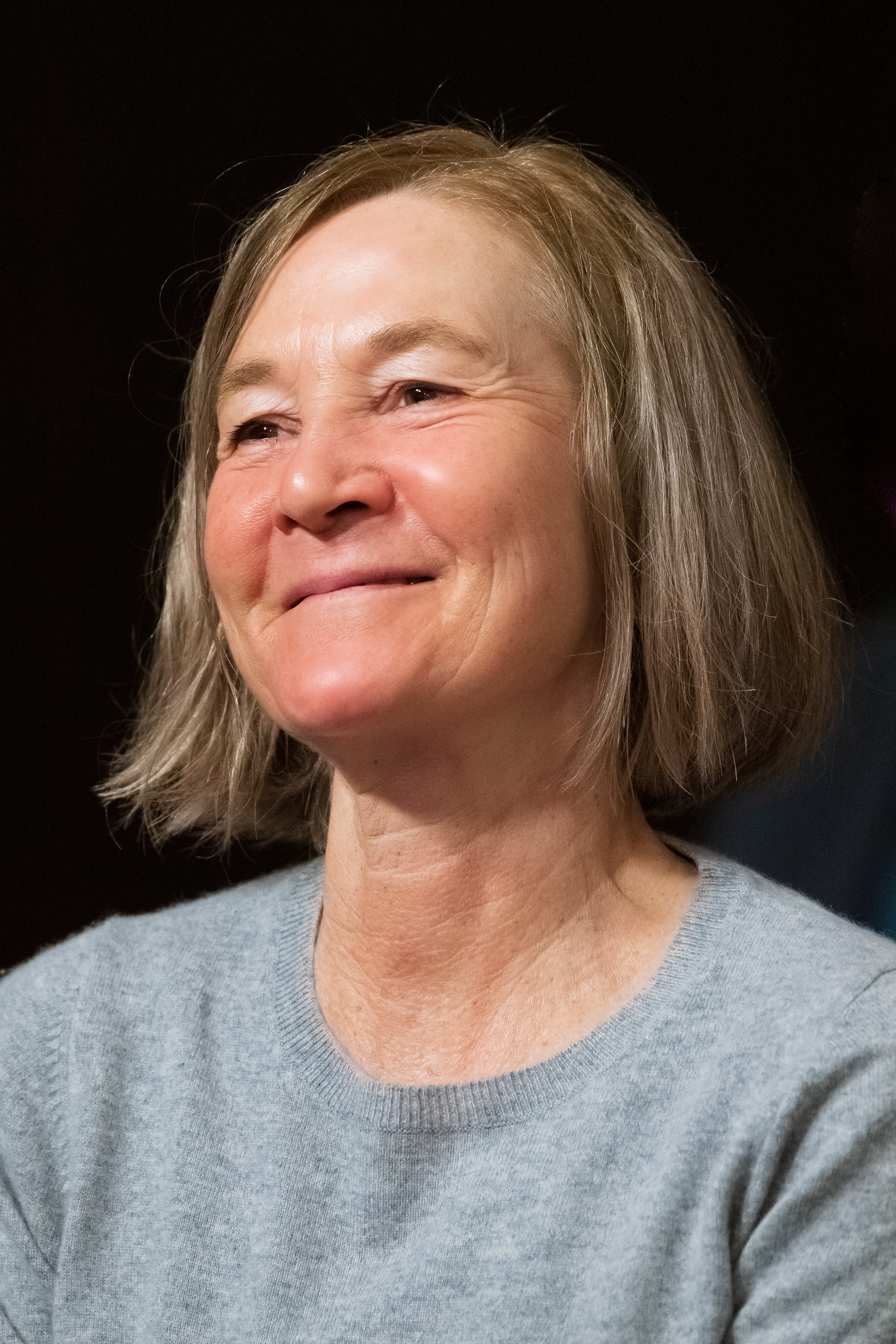
- Kaufmann in 2023
- Born: 20 September 1962 (age 63); Stuttgart, West Germany
- Occupations: Cinematographer, photographer

Judith Kaufmann (born 20 September 1962) is a German cinematographer.

== Biography ==
Judith Kaufmann was born in Stuttgart, West Germany in 1962. But after moving with her family grew up in West Berlin. After graduating from the National College of Optics and Photographer in Berlin, she apprenticed as a photographer.

Kaufmann worked in film as a camera assistant under Konrad Kotowski, Thomas Mauch, Gernot Roll, and Raoul Coutard. Since 1982 Kaufmann focused on film, and in 1991 became chief cinematographer.

== Filmography ==
| Year | Title | a.k.a. | Notes |
|---|---|---|---|
| 2026 | Yellow Letters | Gelbe Briefe | |
| 2025 | Late Shift | Heldin | A Switzerland, Germany co-production film selected at the Berlinale in Special Gala. |
| 2023 | The Teachers' Lounge | | |
| 2022 | Corsage | | |
| 2020 | My Wonderful Wanda | | |
| 2019 | The Audition | | |
| 2019 | A Regular Woman | | |
| 2015 | Time to Say Goodbye | | |
| 2015 | 13 Minutes | | |
| 2015 | Sanctuary | a.k.a. Freistatt – Germany | |
| 2014 | Inbetween Worlds | | |
| 2014 | The Witness House (TV Movie) | a.k.a. Das Zeugenhaus – Germany | |
| 2013 | Dreamland | | |
| 2013 | Back on Track | a.k.a. Sein letztes Rennen – Germany | |
| 2012 | Two Lives | | |
| 2011 | If Not Us, Who? | a.k.a. Wer wenn nicht wir – Germany | |
| 2010 | The End Is My Beginning | a.k.a. Das Ende ist mein Anfang – Germany | |
| 2010 | When We Leave | a.k.a. Die Fremde – Germany | |
| 2008 | Heart of Fire | a.k.a. Feuerherz – Germany | |
| 2006 | 4 Minutes | a.k.a. Vier Minuten – Germany | |
| 2005 | Unveiled | a.k.a. Fremde Haut – Germany | |
| 2004 | Jena Paradies | | |
| 2004 | Peas at 5:30 | a.k.a. Erbsen auf halb 6 – Germany | |
| 2002 | Shattered Glass | a.k.a. Scherbentanz – Germany | |
| 2002 | Brass on Fire | | |
| 2002 | Elephant Heart | a.k.a. Elefantenherz – Germany | |
| 2001 | Engel & Joe | | |
| 2000 | Now or Never: Time Is Money | a.k.a. Jetzt oder nie – Zeit ist Geld – Germany | |
| 2000 | Swetlana | | |
| 2000 | Forget America | a.k.a. Vergiss Amerika – Germany | |
| 1999 | Marie Marie | | |
| 1998 | Everything Will Be Fine | a.k.a. Alles wird gut – Germany | |
| 1995 | Nico Icon | | |
| 1992 | Nie wieder schlafen | | |
| 1988 | Fussel | | |
| 1988 | Aufrecht gehen, Rudi Dutschke – Spuren | | |
TV
| Year | Title | a.k.a. / episodes | other notes |
| 2010 | Alles Liebe | | |
| 2008 | Outta Control | a.k.a. Ihr könnt euch niemals sicher sein – Germany | |
| 2005 | Bella Block | Reise nach China (2008) & Die Frau des Teppichlegers (2005) | |
| 2005 | Tatort | Wem Ehre gebührt (2007) & Der schwarze Troll (2003) | |
| 2007 | Das letzte Stück Himmel | | |
| 2007 | Ich wollte nicht töten | | |
| 2000 | Schwiegermutter | | |
| 1999 | Drachenland | a.k.a. Dragonland – Europe | |
| 1998 | An Angel's Revenge | | |
| 1996 | Niemand außer mir | | |
| 1993 | Tisch und Bett | | |
| 1993 | Außerirdische | | |
| 1991 | Stocker & Stein | | |

== Awards ==
Won
| Year | Film | Award | Ceremony |
|---|---|---|---|
| 2006 | Bella Block: Die Frau des Teppichlegers (episode #1.19) | German Television Award Best Cinematography (Beste Kamera) | German Television Awards |
| 2003 | Shattered Glass | German Camera Award Feature Film (Spielfilm) | German Camera Awards |
| 2003 | Elephant Heart | Bavarian Film Award Best Cinematography (Kamerapreis) | Bavarian Film Awards |
| 2003 | Drachenland | Best Cinematography or Femina Film Award | Max Ophüls Festival |
Nominated
| Year | Title | Awards | Ceremony |
| 2007 | 4 Minutes | Film Award in Gold Best Cinematography (Beste Kamera/Bildgestaltung) | German Film Awards |
| 2006 | Unknown | Marburg Camera Award | Marburg Camera Awards |
| 2006 | 4 Minutes | Golden Frog Award | Camerimage Awards |
| 2003 | Tatort: Der schwarze Troll (episode #1.533) | German Television Award Best Cinematography (Beste Kamera) | German Television Awards |
| 2001 | Now or Never | German Camera Award Feature Film Award (Spielfilm) | German Camera Awards |
| 2000 | Drachenland | German Camera Award TV Film Award (Fernsehfilm – auch Video) | German Camera Awards |
| 1998 | Everything Will Be Fine | Promotional Award TV Film (Fernsehfilm) | German Camera Awards |
