= LoSHA =

Crowdsourced #MeToo list of sexual harassers

LoSHA (an abbreviation of List of Sexual Harassers in Academia) was a crowdsourced list of sexual harassers in academia that was compiled in 2017 by Raya Sarkar, a law student studying at UC Davis School of Law. This list, published on Sarkar's Facebook page with the intention of a cautionary list rather than for institutional action, was cited to have marked the advent of the #MeToo movement in India.

Sarkar received death threats within days of publishing the list which included professors from renowned institutions including Indian Institute of Technology (Bhubaneswar) and Tata Institute of Social Sciences. Fourteen notable feminists including Nivedita Menon and Kavita Krishnan also published a statement expressing dismay over the list, citing a commitment to due process.
