= List of University of Music and Performing Arts Vienna alumni =

University of Music and Performing Arts Vienna alumni

The following is a list of notable University of Music and Performing Arts Vienna alumni.

== Notable alumni ==
=== Conductors ===
- Alexander Alexeev
- Philippe Auguin
- Claudio Abbado
- Alan Buribayev
- James Erb
- James Allen Gähres
- Nikolaus Harnoncourt
- Jascha Horenstein
- Mariss Jansons
- Herbert von Karajan
- Clemens Krauss
- Uroš Lajovic
- Jesús López Cobos
- Gustav Mahler
- Zubin Mehta
- Felix Mottl
- Arthur Nikisch
- Andrés Orozco-Estrada
- Erwin Ortner
- Kirill Petrenko
- Johannes Wildner
- Hans Richter
- Lester José Olivas E.
- Georg Tintner
- Josep Caballé Domenech
- Donald Covert
- Mario Venzago
- Oliver von Dohnányi
- Karel Mark Chichon
- Manfred Honeck
- Walter Weller
- Alexander Rahbari
- Shardad Rohani

=== Composers ===
- Miguel del Águila
- Nicolae Bretan
- Friedrich Cerha
- George Enescu
- Marios Joannou Elia
- Iván Erőd
- Beat Furrer
- Karl Goldmark
- Róbert Gulya
- Georg Friedrich Haas
- Paul Haslinger
- Géza Horváth (composer)
- Leoš Janáček
- Gustav Mahler
- Alireza Mashayekhi
- Ahmad Pejman
- Ezio Bosso
- Thomas Larcher
- Hans Rott
- Heinrich Schalit
- Kurt Schwertsik
- Jean Sibelius
- Mauricio Sotelo
- Ferdi Statzer
- Johannes Maria Staud
- Mimi Wagensonner
- Norma Wendelburg
- Johannes Winkler
- Hugo Wolf
- Alexander von Zemlinsky

=== Pianists and organists ===
- Miguel del Águila
- Khatia Buniatishvili
- Rudolf Buchbinder
- Helmut Deutsch
- Matthias Fletzberger
- Friedrich Gulda
- Mitsuko Uchida
- Maciej Łukaszczyk
- Christiana Lin
- Wayne Marshall
- Peter Planyavsky
- Wolfgang Sauseng
- Paul Weingarten
- Erik Werba

=== String players ===
- Christoph Koncz
- Joseph Joachim
- Oskar Back
- Johanna Beisteiner
- Carl Flesch
- Gareth Koch
- Leon Koudelak
- Fritz Kreisler
- Johannes Wildner
- Heinrich Schiff
- Günter Pichler
- Dragomir Krančević
- Joji Hattori
- Manfred Honeck
- Ludwig Streicher
- Walter Weller
- Friedrich Buxbaum
- Georg Hellmesberger Sr.
- Ricardo Odnoposoff
- Arnold Rosé
- Rainer Küchl
- Shkelzen Doli

David grunschlag

=== Wind, brass, and percussion ===
- Thomas Gansch
- Johann Hindler
- Ernst Ottensamer
- Carole Dawn Reinhart

=== Singers ===
- Walter Berry
- Mimi Coertse
- Kieth Engen
- Antonia Fahberg
- Anny Felbermayer
- Marie Fillunger
- Aida Garifullina
- Agnieszka Gertner-Polak
- Ernst Gutstein
- Liviu Holender
- Wolfgang Holzmair
- Angelika Kirchschlager
- Gabrielle Krauss
- Genia Kühmeier
- Elisabeth Kulman
- Kari Løvaas
- Aga Mikolaj
- Lula Mysz-Gmeiner
- Anna Nekhames
- Cristina Pasaroiu
- Kurt Rydl
- Andreas Schager
- Michael Spyres
- Linda Watson (soprano)

=== Film and theatre ===
- Barbara Albert
- Achim Benning
- Emily Cox
- Arthur Hellmer
- Katharina Mückstein
- Dávid Paška
- Max Steiner
- Robert O. Ragland
- Sophie Rois
- Ulrich Seidl
- Christoph Waltz

=== Other ===
- Stephanie Goldner
- Susana Naidich
- Leopold Nowak
- Heinrich Schenker
- Elisabeth Wärnfeldt
- Josef Venantius von Wöss
