= Ottensamer =

Ottensamer is a surname. Notable people with the surname include:

- Andreas Ottensamer (born 1989), Austrian classical clarinetist
- Daniel Ottensamer (born 1986), Austrian classical clarinetist, brother of Andreas
- Ernst Ottensamer (1955–2017), Austrian classical clarinetist, father of Andreas and Daniel
