= Prelude, Fugue and Riffs =

Composition by Leonard Bernstein

- Composition by Leonard Bernstein
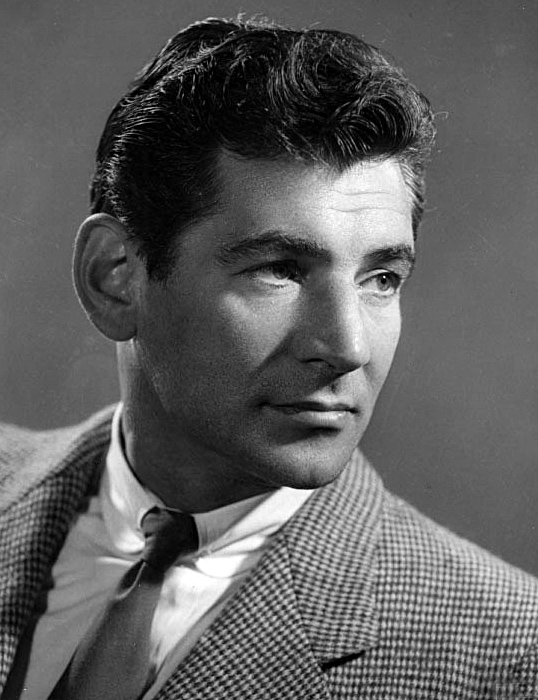
- The composer in the 1950s
- Composed: 1949
- Dedication: Woody Herman's big band
- Performed: October 16, 1955
- Movements: three
- Scoring: clarinet; jazz ensemble

Prelude, Fugue and Riffs is a "written-out" jazz-in-concert-hall composition composed by Leonard Bernstein for a jazz ensemble featuring solo clarinet.

The title points to the union of classical music and jazz: Prelude (first movement) and Fugue (second movement) – both baroque forms – are followed immediately without a pause by a series of "riffs" (third movement), which is a jazz term for a repeated and short melodic figure.

It features:

- brass and rhythm in the first movement,
- saxophones in the second movement, and
- the entire ensemble plus solo clarinet in the third movement first with backing from the piano then by the entire ensemble.

Completed in 1949 for Woody Herman's big band as part of a series of commissioned works – that already included Stravinsky's Ebony Concerto – it was never performed by Herman, possibly because his orchestra had disbanded at that time.

Instead, it received its premiere on Bernstein's Omnibus television show, The World of Jazz on October 16, 1955. The soloist for the work's TV premiere was Al Gallodoro; he is seen in the preserved 1955 video playing alto saxophone and then the clarinet solo passages. Some sources instead credit Benny Goodman, to whom the work was dedicated upon its publication.

In 1952 Bernstein revised the score from its original instrumentation for a more conventional pit orchestra, and the work was then incorporated into a ballet sequence in the first draft of the musical comedy Wonderful Town. The revised version of Prelude, Fugue and Riffs did not survive and the majority of the music was cut from the final version of the Wonderful Town score with the exception of a few phrases in the musical's numbers "Conquering the City" and "Conversation Piece".

It later was transcribed for clarinet and orchestra by Lukas Foss.

In 2025 it was arranged by Simon Wright for trumpet soloist Alison Balsom, and performed with the BBC Symphony Orchestra in the Finale of the Last Night of the Proms 2025 at The Royal Albert Hall.

== Discography ==
Recordings by Leonard Bernstein

- Benny Goodman. Benny Goodman Collector's Edition, CBS MK 42227
- Peter Schmidl. Bernstein Conducts Bernstein, Deutsche Grammophon 447952-2 GLB, (1949), (p) 1992

Recording of big band version

- Wolfgang Meyer. Homage to Benny Goodman, EMI Classics 7243 5 56652 2 5 (1998), (p) 1998

Recordings available on CD

- Michael Collins. The Jazz Album, EMI CDC 7 47991 2
- Harmen de Boer. Bernstein/Copland/Gershwin/Stravinsky, Chandos CHAN 9210 (1993), (p) 1993
- Benny Goodman. Benny Goodman Collector's Edition, CBS MK 42227
- Wolfgang Meyer. Homage to Benny Goodman, EMI Classics 7243 5 56652 2 5 (1998), (p) 1998
- Peter Schmidl. Bernstein Conducts Bernstein, Deutsche Grammophon 447952-2 GLB, (1949), (p) 1992
- Richard Stoltzman. Copland/Corigliano/Bernstein, RCA Victor Red Seal RD 87762 (1988), (p) 1988
- John Bruce Yeh. Stravinsky/Bernstein/Gould/Babin/Shaw, Reference Recordings RR-55CD (1993), (p) 1993
