= Fritz Walden =

Austrian writer (1914–1992)

Fritz Walden, real name Friedrich Drobilitsch, also Fritz Drobilitsch-Walden and Franz Drobilitsch, (3 January 1914 – 12 September 1992) was an Austrian publicist, author and cultural editor as well as film, literature, music and theatre critic.

== Life ==
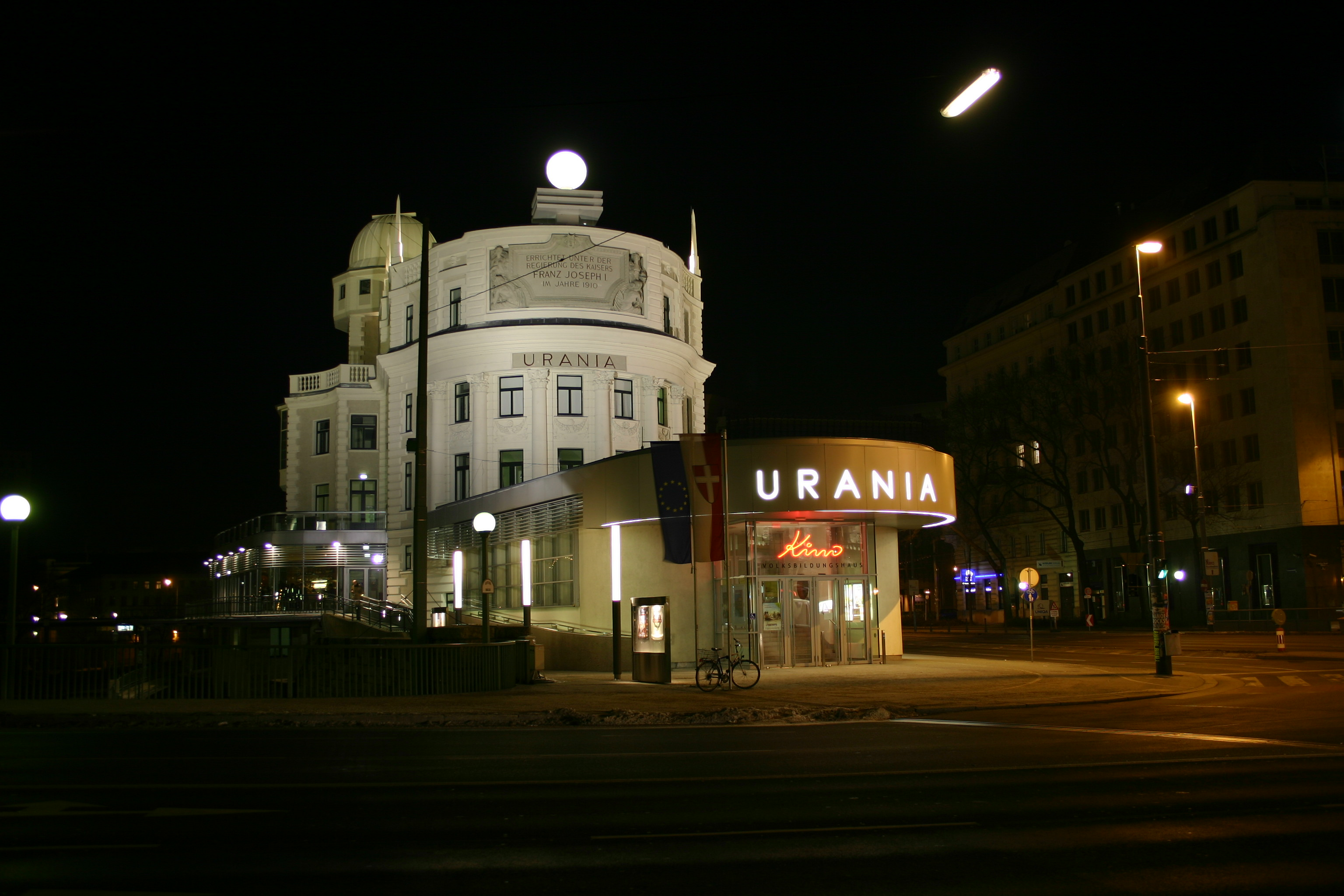
In the 70s a cinema hall was built in the Vienna Urania where Walden presented his film analysis lessons at the Film Academy, where films from all periods were viewed and discussed every Saturday morning.

Born in Vienna, Walden studied several semesters German studies. Since the 1950s, he was cultural editor of the Viennese Arbeiter-Zeitung. He actively participated in cultural events, and in 1964 he was a founding member of the Vereins der Wiener Filmfestwochen, which took over the organization of the Vienna Film Festival Viennale, as it was now called, alongside Edwin Zbonek. He taught film analysis at the Vienna Film Academy in the 1970s and 80s, was asked to serve as a juror at international film festivals such as the Berlinale and in the 1980s was a member of the jury of the Film Advisory Board of the Austrian Film Fund of the Federal Ministry of Education, Science and Research He was also a patron and mentor of young Viennese filmmakers, whom he sometimes supported materially. Through the first font insert in the opening credits of the film Mansur Madavi dedicated his film Notausgang to him out of gratitude.

Walden belonged to a generation of critics who made no secret of their passion for films, Theaterstücke oder Opern which were and are often reviewed in other media by colleagues from other countries. or in diplomacy thesis.

Walden also appeared in films and wrote poetry for contemporary music.

Walden died in Vienna at the age of 78.

== Publications ==
As fiction critic

- Als wäre es nie gewesen. Anatomie eines Verrates. Roman. Hans Deutsch Verlag, Vienna 1962.
- Sindelar. Der "papierene" Heerführer. Eine Erzählung. Verlag der Zeitschrift Der jugendliche Arbeiter, Vienna 1949.

Other publications

- Der tschechoslowakische Film. ed.: Socialist Students of Austria, Vienna 1966 (with Antonín J. Liehm, Jean de Baroncelli.
- Österreichs Film: Eine Chronik der verlorenen Jahre. In Jacques Hannak (ed.): Bestandaufnahme Österreich. 1945–1963. Forum-Verlag, Vienna 1963, p. 438 (Fachaufsatz).
- Der Kopf des Monats. Ein armer Mann wie Josef Luitpold Stern. Vienna 1949 (biography).
- Ich gab Euch Zeit! Kleine Lebensgeschichte des großen Sozialreformers Ferdinand Hanusch. Österreichischer Gewerkschaftsbund, Vienna 1948 (Jugendschriftenreihe, issue 4; Biography).
