= Eugene Ormandy =

Hungarian-American conductor and violinist (1899–1985)

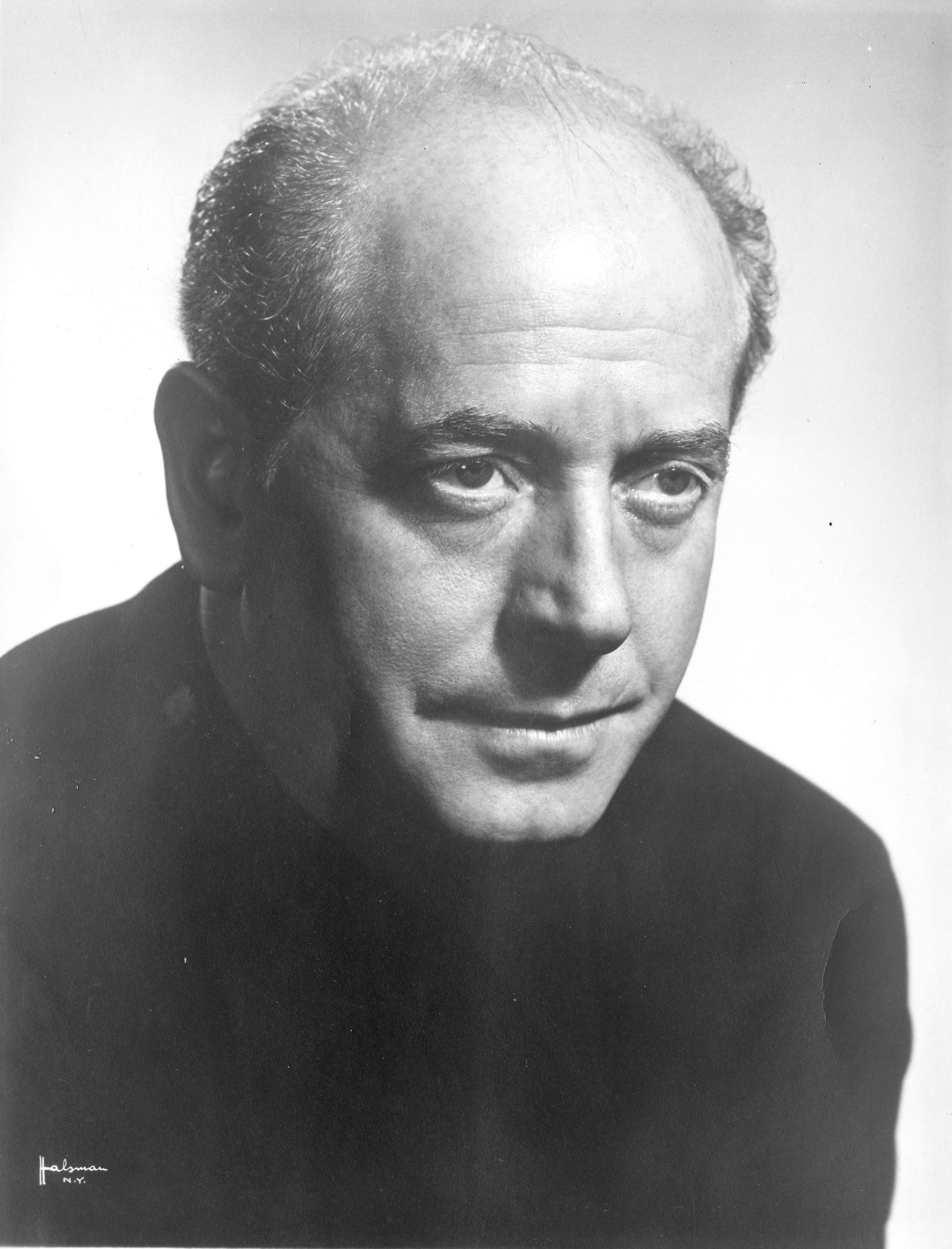
The Hungarian-American conductor Eugene Ormandy (c. 1950s)

Eugene Ormandy (born Jenő Blau; November 18, 1899 – March 12, 1985) was a Hungarian-born American conductor and violinist, best known for his association with the Philadelphia Orchestra, as its music director. His 44-year association with the orchestra is one of the longest enjoyed by any conductor with any American orchestra. Ormandy made numerous recordings with the orchestra, and as guest conductor with European orchestras, and achieved three gold records and two Grammy Awards. His reputation was as a skilled technician and expert orchestral builder.

== Early life ==
Ormandy was born in Budapest, Austria-Hungary, as Jenő Blau, the son of Jewish parents Benjamin Blau, a dentist and amateur violinist, and Rozália Berger. His musical talents emerged early. Blau received his first violin lessons from his father at the age of three and a half and was proficient enough as a violinist to enter the Royal National Hungarian Academy of Music at the age of five, being the youngest student to date. From 1909 a student of Jenő Hubay, he passed the finals in chamber music and in violin in spring of 1915. From 1917 Blau undertook first tours in Hungary and Germany; among other things as concertmaster of the Berlin Blüthner Orchestra. In 1918 he became briefly professor for violin at his old university. From 1917 to 1920 he also completed a degree in philosophy. Motivated by promises made by a dubious impresario, he emigrated to the US in 1921.

Until 1918 Ormandy used the stage name "Eugen Blau" in public performances, "Eugen" being the German equivalent of "Jenő". About 1919, after the end of the Austro-Hungarian Empire, he used "Jenő B. Ormándy". At the time of his arrival in America in 1921, he was using "Jeno Blau", but by 1925 he was going by "Eugene Ormandy". The origin of the surname "Ormandy" is uncertain. Speculation that it was either his middle name or that of his mother appears to be unfounded. His father changed his surname to "Ormándi" on March 22, 1937, a few weeks before emigrating to the United States.

Arthur Judson, the most powerful manager of American classical music during the 1930s, first heard Ormandy when he conducted (as a freelancer) for a dance recital at Carnegie Hall by Isadora Duncan; Judson later said, "I came to see a dancer and instead heard a conductor."

== Career ==
At Judson's instigation Ormandy substituted for the unavailable Arturo Toscanini with the Philadelphia Orchestra in 1931. This led to an appointment as musical director of the Minneapolis Symphony Orchestra, a post he held from 1931 to 1936. In this post he became nationally known in the US through his recordings, which included the first versions on disc of Kodály's Háry János suite and Schoenberg's Verklärte Nacht. In 1936 he returned to Philadelphia as joint conductor with Leopold Stokowski. After two years he became the orchestra's sole music director; he held the post for 42 years (1938–1980), before stepping down to be its conductor laureate. He took the Philadelphia Orchestra on several national and international tours, and appeared as a guest conductor with other orchestras in Europe, Australia, South America and East Asia. Ormandy built on what Grove's Dictionary of Music and Musicians calls "Stokowski's voluptuous 'Philadelphia Sound'" and added further polish and precision. Despite, or even because of, this, among many music critics and others, as Harold C. Schonberg opined in a 1967 study, "there was a singular reluctance in musical circles to admit him into the ranks of great conductors". He was thought superficial; Toscanini dismissed him as "an ideal conductor of Johann Strauss" and a similar remark is attributed to Igor Stravinsky. Donald Peck, principal flute of the Chicago Symphony Orchestra, reports that a fellow flutist was won over when Ormandy conducted the Chicago in Beethoven's Ninth Symphony; he told Peck that it was the greatest Ninth he had ever heard. The conductor Kenneth Woods ranked Ormandy 14th of the "Real Top 20 of Conducting," saying,

Critics hate Ormandy. It must be the first "fact" they teach at critic school – always work in an Ormandy slam into every article you write. Record collectors hate him, too. I just don't get it. The film of him looks pretty impressive – classical and classy conducting technique, not at all showy. His Philadelphia Orchestra was the only real rival to Karajan's Berlin for sonic beauty in the 50s–70s, but was also a tighter and more versatile band.

Schonberg called Ormandy "an excellent technician with a technicolored approach". Grove comments that Ormandy may have contributed to this image by concentrating on the late-Romantic and early 20th-century repertory that showed to advantage the lush sound he could command in works by composers such as Debussy, Ravel, Richard Strauss, Tchaikovsky, and Sergei Rachmaninoff. Schonberg commented that Ormandy programmed very little Haydn or Mozart and approached Beethoven "in a rather gingerly manner". He conducted much less new music than his predecessor, Stokowski, had done, but did not ignore it, and gave the premieres of works including Rachmaninoff's Symphonic Dances, which is dedicated to him and the orchestra, Bartók's Piano Concerto No.3, Britten's Diversions for Piano Left Hand and Orchestra and music by Ginastera, Hindemith, Martinů, Milhaud, Villa-Lobos and Webern. He did not neglect American composers, and among premieres he gave were works by Samuel Barber, David Diamond, Walter Piston, Ned Rorem, William Schuman, Roger Sessions and Virgil Thomson.

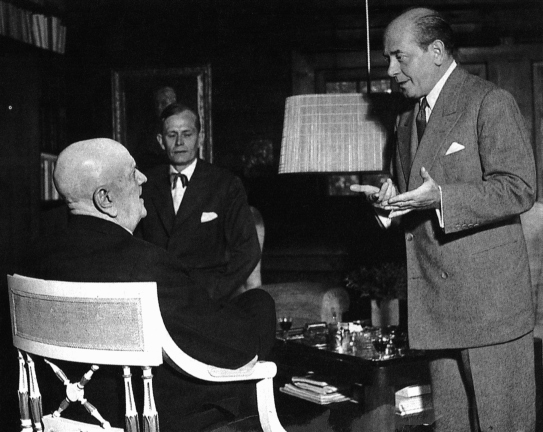
Ormandy visited Finland several times. Here he is seen in 1951 with Jean Sibelius (left) and Nils-Eric Ringbom in Sibelius' home, Ainola.

Schonberg concluded his study of Ormandy with the words, "Ormandy does not conduct with the overwhelming personality of a Furtwängler, or with the ferocity and clarity of a Toscanini, or with the immense knowledge and classicism of a Szell. But he has carved out an area for himself, and within it he is secure, a perfect workman and a sensitive interpreter. And it is an area that takes in a great deal more than Strauss waltzes".

In 1980, aged 80, Ormandy retired as chief conductor of the Philadelphia Orchestra, but continued to appear as its conductor laureate. His last concert was with his Philadelphia colleagues at Carnegie Hall on January 10, 1984. His tenure, as chief conductor and then laureate was the longest unbroken association between a conductor and a major American orchestra.

He died of pneumonia at his home in Philadelphia, Pennsylvania], on March 12, 1985, at the age of 85. Having converted to Protestanism earlier in life,, he is buried in the Old Pine Street Church graveyard.

== Awards and honors ==
In honor of Ormandy's vast influence on American music and the Philadelphia performing arts community, on December 15, 1972, he was awarded the University of Pennsylvania Glee Club Award of Merit. He was appointed by Queen Elizabeth II as an honorary Knight Commander of the Order of the British Empire (KBE) in 1976, and received of Yale University's Sanford Medal. He was elected to the American Philosophical Society in 1977. After Ormandy's death the US Congress and President Ronald Reagan declared that November 18 would be "Eugene Ormandy Appreciation Day", with a recognition ceremony held on that date at the Academy of Music. He was given the very first "Eugene Ormandy" medal for distinguished service by the Philadelphia Orchestra on his retirement in 1980.

Ormandy's collection of 1,400 orchestral scores is now in the library of the University of Pennsylvania, and he is also commemorated in the name of its Eugene Ormandy Music and Media Center at the Otto E. Albecht Music Library.

== Marriages ==
On 8 August 1922 Ormandy married Stephanie Goldner. "Steffy" Goldner had come to New York in 1921 from her native Vienna, where she had attended the city's Academy of Music. Soon after arriving in New York she took a position at Capitol Theatre where Ormandy was a violinist. For more than a decade she was harpist for the New York Philharmonic, the only woman on its roster. The two later did broadcast performances on WABC radio, where Ormandy was one of the staff conductors.

In the fall of 1946, the couple parted. "There is no talk now of divorce [...] It's just a separation," Mrs. Ormandy reported. However, she later filed for divorce, decreed 4 August 1947 "on grounds of extreme mental cruelty." Following the divorce she joined the faculty at the Philadelphia Music Academy while announcing plans to resume her performing.

On 15 May 1950 Ormandy married Margaret Frances Hiltsch in a civil ceremony in Philadelphia. In a statement released by the Philadelphia Orchestra Association, the two were described as "family friends for many years [...] Mrs. Ormandy came to the United States about 12 years ago from Vienna [...] shortly thereafter she became an American citizen. During the war years Mrs. Ormandy became a licensed pilot in preparation for the WASP training program. However, as the unit was then disbanded, she enlisted in the U.S. Navy and for two years was then stationed at Norfolk, VA., in operations work at the Naval Air Station."

The couple remained wed until his death in 1985.

== Recordings ==
External audio
- You may hear Eugene Ormandy conducting Ludwig van Beethoven's Symphony No. 7 in A major, Op. 92 with the Philadelphia Orchestra in 1945 here on archive.org

Ormandy's recording career began with the Minneapolis Symphony for RCA Victor in 1934 and included the first US recordings of symphonies by Anton Bruckner (No. 7) and Gustav Mahler (No. 2). He remained with RCA Victor after becoming music director of the Philadelphia Orchestra in 1938. In 1944, Ormandy and the Philadelphians began a 23-year association with Columbia Records. His many recordings for Columbia include the first US recording of the Fourth Symphony of Dmitri Shostakovich and the first ever recording of Mahler's Tenth Symphony in the performing version by Deryck Cooke. (Ormandy and the Philadelphia Orchestra gave the first public performance of the Mahler/Cooke Symphony No. 10 at the express invitation of Mahler's widow Alma.) In 1968, conductor and orchestra returned to RCA Victor, recording for the label until 1981. His recordings of Saint-Saëns's Symphony No. 3, "Organ'" were considered the best ever produced by Fanfare Magazine which remarked of the 1974 RCA Red Seal recording with organist Virgil Fox: "This beautifully played performance outclasses all versions of this symphony." The Telarc recording of the symphony with Michael Murray from 1980 is also highly praised.

Under Ormandy's baton, the Philadelphia Orchestra had three gold records and won two Grammy Awards.

Ormandy's first digital recording was a performance of Béla Bartók's Concerto for Orchestra for RCA Red Seal in 1979.

External audio
- You may hear Eugene Ormandy conducting Sergei Prokofiev's Symphony No. 1 in D major ("Classical"), Op. 25 with the Philadelphia Orchestra in 1950 Here on archive.org

External audio
- You may hear Eugene Ormandy conducting Johannes Brahms' Violin Concerto in D major, Op. 77 with Joseph Szigeti and the Philadelphia Orchestra in 1945 Here on archive.org

External audio
- You may hear Eugene Ormandy conducting Nikolai Rimsky-Korsakov's Russian Easter Festival Overture, Op. 36 with the Philadelphia Orchestra in 1950 Here on archive.org

== Filmography ==
- Night Song (1948)

== Sources ==
- Schonberg, Harold C. (1967). The Great Conductors. New York: Simon and Schuster. ISBN 978-0-67-120735-9.
