= Urania Sternwarte (disambiguation) =

Urania Sternwarte is an observatory in Zurich, Switzerland.

Urania Sternwarte may also refer to:

- Urania Sternwarte (Vienna), at Vienna, Austria
- Urania Sternwarte (Berlin), at Berlin, Germany; see List of largest optical refracting telescopes
