= Carl Julius Haidvogel =

Austrian writer (1891–1974)

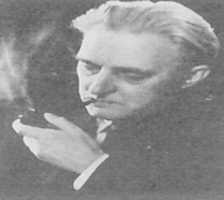
- Born: September 13, 1891; Vienna, Austria
- Died: December 26, 1974 (aged 83); Graz, Austria
- Occupation(s): registrar, part time editor

Carl Julius Haidvogel was born to Carl Haidvogel and Juliana on 13 September 1891 in Vienna, Austria.

From 1912, Haidvogel worked as a registrar for the municipality of Vienna, was a part-time editor at the public educational institute and observatory Urania, and a dramaturge at the Bühne der Jungen. He started publishing his famous literary works in 1918. In the 1920s, he came into contact with the "Weekend and Settlement Movement" of the Viennese municipal Councillor Anton Weber, which also influenced his work. In 1937, Haidvogel joined the "Union of German Writers in Austria". Although Haidvogel was not among the contributors to the Confession Book of the "Union of German Writers of Austria" (BdSÖ), he was one of the signatories of the "Confession of the Union of German Writers to the Führer", published in Grazer Tagespost on 27 March 1938. Haidvogel was friends with Josef Weinheber and Karl Heinrich Waggerl. Haidvogel's work "The Pillars of God" was placed on the list of banned authors and books in Austria in 1946. In 1956, Haidvogel was retired. In 1971, he received the Austrian Decoration for Science and Art. He welcomed his son Gerhard with wife Lotte on 14 January 1921; Gerhard became the famous Austrian architect Gerhard Haidvogel. Carl Julius Haidvogel died on 26 December 1974 in Graz.

== Works ==
- Der heimliche Spiegel. Wien: Ver, 1918.
- Golgatha. Wien: Interterrit. Verlag Renaissance, 1920.
- Die Wiedergeburt in Kain. Wien: Wiener Graph. Werkstätte, 1920.
- Bundschuh. Wien: Luser, 1939.
- Einer am Rande. München: Braun & Schneider, 1939.
- Soldat der Erde. München: Braun & Schneider, 1939.
- Die Pfeiler Gottes. Wien: Wiener Verlag, 1942.
- Herzbrunn. Wien: Wiener Verlag, 1943.
- Wast. Wien: Wiener Verlag, 1943.
- Landsidl besucht die Natur. Wien: Wiener Verlag, 1944.
- Das Teufelsloch. Wien-Mödling: St.-Gabriel-Verlag, 1954.
- Der Reiter auf zwei Pferden oder wem Gott ein Amt gibt.... Innsbruck: Österreichische Verlagsanstalt, 1954.
- Mädchen ohne Mann. Wien: Deutsche Buchgemeinschaft, 1954.
- Herbsthimmel. Innsbruck: Österreichische Verlagsanstalt, 1955.
- Scherben bringen Glück. Wien: Gritsch, 1956.
- Der treue Diener. Wien: Gasolin Gesellschaft, 1957.
- Vaterland. Krems a.d. Donau: Faber, 1957.
- Es war einmal ein Vater. Krems a.d. Donau: Buchgemeinschaft Heimatland, 1961.
- In die Wolke geschrieben. Wien: Österreichische Verlagsanstalt, 1961.
- Das unerbittliche Glück. Stuttgart: Steinkopf, 1963.
- Mensch nach siebzehn Uhr. Graz: Stocker, 1964.
- Asphalt und Acker. Wien: Österreichische Verlagsanstalt, 1966.
- Salz in der Wunde. Krems a.d. Donau: Heimatland-Verlag, 1966.
- Bomm. Wien: Österreichische Verlagsanst., 1969.
- Hand aufs Herz. Wien: Österreichische Verlagsanstalt, 1972.
- Traum wird Wort. Wien: Kisler, 1972.
