= Andreas Ottensamer =

Austrian clarinetist and conductor (born 1989)

- Born: April 4, 1989 (age 37); Vienna, Austria
- Occupation: Conductor
- Instrument: Clarinet
- Label: Deutsche Grammophon

Andreas Ottensamer (born 4 April 1989) is an Austrian clarinettist and conductor. He was the principal clarinettist of the Berlin Philharmonic before he stepped down from his position on January 27, 2025. He announced his decision in order to focus on his career as a conductor.

== Life ==
Born in Vienna, Ottensamer commenced his musical studies in 1999 at the University of Music and Performing Arts Vienna on piano and then on cello with Wolfgang Herzer and then from 2003 clarinet with Johann Hindler. Ottensamer also enrolled as a student at Harvard University in the United States. Ottensamer first gained his orchestral experience as substitute clarinet in the Vienna State Opera and the Vienna Philharmonic and is a former member of the Gustav Mahler Youth Orchestra. In October 2Orchestra Academy of the Berlin Philharmonic. From July 2010 to February 2011, he was solo clarinettist of the German Symphony Orchestra, Berlin and since March 2011 he has filled the position of solo clarinet with the Berlin Philharmonic.

First prize winner of several competitions on clarinet, piano and cello, Ottensamer has performed as soloist worldwide with partners such as the Vienna Philharmonic, the Berlin Philharmonic, the Mahler Chamber Orchestra, the London Philharmonic and chamber musician with performers including Sol Gabetta, Yuja Wang, Leif Ove Andsnes, Gautier Capucon and Yo-Yo Ma. In 2005, together with father Ernst Ottensamer and his older brother Daniel Ottensamer (both solo clarinettists of the Vienna Philharmonic), formed the clarinet trio The Clarinotts. The ensemble gives concert tours in Austria, Germany, Italy, Japan, the United States, performs at festivals all over the world, appeared on TV and radio and in 1999 recorded a CD published by Gramola Vienna and Octavia Records.

Ottensamer accompanied Tori Amos on her 2011 album Night of Hunters.

In 2013 Ottensamer entered an exclusive recording agreement with Universal Classics's Mercury Classics label, in partnership with Deutsche Grammophon (DG). This makes him the first clarinettist to release exclusively through DG. His debut album, Portraits – The Clarinet Album, was released in June 2013 internationally through Mercury Classics/Deutsche Grammophon and features concertos by Domenico Cimarosa, George Gershwin and Aaron Copland, recorded with the Rotterdam Philharmonic Orchestra and Yannick Nézet-Séguin.

As conductor he works with orchestras such as NHK Symphony Orchestra, Orchestre National du Capitol Toulouse, Mozarteumorchester Salzburg, Oxford Philharmonic, Basel Chamber Orchestra, Seoul Philharmonic. In 2026 he conducted a production of Engelbert Humperdinck’s opera “Hansel and Gretel” at the Houston Grand Opera.
