= Karl Weigl =

Austrian composer

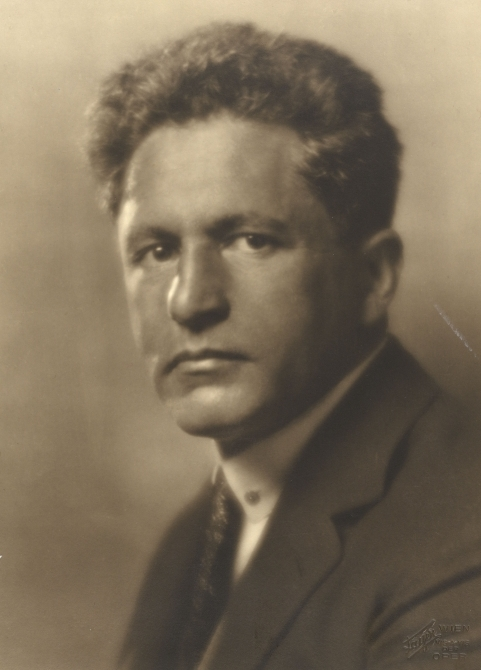
Karl Weigl in 1927, taken by Georg Fayer.

Karl Ignaz Weigl (6 February 1881 – 11 August 1949) was a Jewish Austrian composer and pianist, who later became a naturalized American citizen in 1943.

== Biography ==
Weigl was born in Vienna, Austria, the son of a bank official who was also a keen amateur musician. Alexander Zemlinsky took him as a private pupil in 1896. Weigl went to school at the Franz-Joseph-Gymnasium and graduated from there in 1899. After that, he continued his studies at the Vienna Music Academy, where he became a composition pupil of Robert Fuchs, and also enrolled at the University of Vienna, studying musicology under Guido Adler, with Anton Webern as his classmate. At the Vienna Hofoper between 1904 and 1906 he served as a rehearsal conductor for Gustav Mahler. In 1930 he was appointed professor of theory and composition at the University of Vienna, where he succeeded Hans Gal and taught composer Mimi Wagensonner.

When the Nazis occupied Austria in 1938, Weigl's music could no longer be performed. He emigrated to the United States of America, together with his second wife, the composer and music therapist Vally Weigl (née Pick), and their son. There, he obtained a number of increasingly important teaching posts: at the Hartt School of Music, at Brooklyn College, at the Boston Conservatory and, from 1948 on, at the Philadelphia Musical Academy. Weigl often appeared as a soloist and also played four-handed with his wife. He died in New York after a prolonged battle with bone marrow cancer.

Weigl's music, which was admired by Mahler, Schoenberg and Strauss, shows the influence of Brahms, with an emphasis on polyphony. His works include six symphonies, several concertos, chamber music pieces including eight string quartets, many songs (lieder in the tradition of Wolf and Mahler) and solo piano works. His only opera, Der Rattenfänger von Hameln, premiered in Vienna in 1932.

== Works (selection) ==
=== Symphonies ===
- Symphony No. 1 in E major, Op. 5 (1908)
- Symphony No. 2 in D minor, Op. 19 (1922)
- Symphony No. 3 in B major (1931)
- Symphony No. 4 in F minor (1936)
- Symphony No. 5, "Apocalyptic Symphony" (1945)
- Symphony No. 6 in A minor (1947)

=== Orchestral works ===
- Der 71. Psalm for female choir and orchestra (1901)
- Symphonisches Vorspiel zu einer Tragödie (1933)
- Music for the Young (Boy Scouts Overture) für kleines Orchester (1939)
- Drei Gesänge für hohe Frauenstimme und Orchester (1916)
- Phantastisches Intermezzo, 1922 (4th movement from the 2nd Symphony, to be performed as a separate work)
- Piano Concerto No. 1 for the left hand in E flat, 1924
- Violin Concerto in D major (1928)
- Piano Concerto No. 2 in F minor, Op. 21 (1931)
- Cello Concerto (1934)
- Rhapsody for Piano and Orchestra (1940)

=== Opera ===
- Der Rattenfänger von Hameln, Op. 24, Märchenspiel in vier Bildern (1932)

=== Choral works ===
- Drei Gedichte von Lenau, für achtstimmigen gemischten Chor a cappella, Op. 6 (1909)

=== Chamber music ===
- String Quartet No. 1 in C minor, Op. 20 (1905/1906)
- String Quartet No. 2 in E major, with Viola d'amore (1906)
- String Quartet No. 3 in A major, Op. 4 (1909)
- String Quartet No. 4 in d minor (1924) Op. Post.
- String Quartet No. 5 in G major, Op. 31 (1933)
- Fünf Lieder für eine hohe Singstimme und Klavier, Op. 23 (1911)
- Violin Sonata No. 1, Op. 16 (1923)
- String Quartet No. 6 in C (1939)
- String Quartet No. 7 in F minor (1941-2)
- String Quartet No. 8 in D major (1949)
- Two Pieces for cello and piano, Op. 33
- Minuet for cello and piano
- Piano Trio (1939)

== Notable students ==
- Erich Wolfgang Korngold
- Rosy Wertheim
- Ernst Bacon
- Hanns Eisler
- Kurt Adler
