= Christiana Lin =

Christiana Lin 林秋孜
- Born: Taipei, Taiwan
- Genres: Classical
- Occupation(s): pianist, educator, harpsichordist
- Instrument: Piano
- Website: www.christianalin.idv.tw

Christiana Lin (Chinese: 林秋孜; born in Taipei) is a Taiwanese-Austrian pianist and harpsichordist. Since 1994 she has been a Steinway Artist.

== Education ==
From 1978 to 1992, she studied in Vienna, Innsbruck and Munich and was conferred the Diplom Ausgezeichnet in piano performing from the University of Music and Performing Arts, Vienna, where she studied piano under Noel Flores, and composition with Erich Urbanner. She was also conferred the Diplom Ausgezeichnet in piano performing and Diplom in music education with additional Schwerpunkt in Cembalo (harpsichord) from the Tiroler Landeskonservatorium Innsbruck where she studied piano under Claude-France Journès, a renowned French-German pianist, and harpsichord under Michael Jaud, an Austrian harpsichordist and organist. For several times at the Mozarteum International Summer Academy in Salzburg, she studied piano with the American pianist, Leon Fleisher. She also has been to the Moscow Conservatory several times, studying with Monov and Natalie Trull.

Lin is piano and harpsichord professor at the colleges and graduate schools of Soochow University and National Taiwan University of Arts in Taipei.

== Career ==
Lin was the first musician ever to play both harpsichord and piano in one recital. In the past many years, she has been invited to perform around Europe and Asia, such as Vienna, Innsbruck, Munich, Beijing, Hong Kong, and Taiwan. In 1989, she was invited by the Vienna Arts Festival to give a piano recital at the Urania concert hall. She also gave many piano and harpsichord recitals at the Innsbruck Konservatorium Saal. In 1991, she worked with the conductor Edgar Seipenbush and the Innsbruck Symphoniker, performing Schumann's Piano Concerto in A minor Op. 54. Conductors she has collaborated with in concerts include Edgar Seipenbush, Mark Graveson, Henry Mazer, Jaime Laredo, Nien-Fu David Liao, Wen-Hsien Chang, and Cheng-Tu Su. Orchestras and musical groups she performed with include the Innsbruck Symphoniker, Innsbruck Chamber Orchestra, National Symphony Orchestra (Taiwan), Taipei Symphony Orchestra, Taipei Sinfonietta & Philharmonic Orchestra, Taipei Chamber Orchestra, Pace Symphony Orchestra, Hua-Gang Symphony Orchestra, and Da-Guan Symphony Orchestra.

In 1995, Dr. Merton Miller, who won the 1990 Nobel Memorial Prize in Economic Sciences, visited Taiwan. Lin was the only musician invited to play in his welcoming party. Among all concerts, she was also invited to appear in 1997 Taipei International Music Festival to perform with artists such as conductor Jaime Laredo, cellist Yo-Yo Ma and violinist Cho-Liang Lin. In 2008, she was invited by the Taiwan National Palace Museum to perform in the documentary Carving the Subtle Radiance of Colors: Treasured Lacquerware in the National Palace Museum. In the 2009 "An Evening of Symphony" concert, she performed Beethoven's Piano Concert No. 1 with the conductor Nien-Fu Liao and the Da-Guan Symphony Orchestra. She composed the cadenza herself, which was its international debut. In 2012, she was invited by Steinway & Sons Piano Center to hold a master class as part of Steinway's Beethoven Summer Festival.

In 2011, she held a concert titled "From Vienna to Beijing – the Conversation between Piano and Guqin" in the Multi-Function Hall of Peking University Centennial Memorial Hall, which was a concert blending Oriental and western artistries.

Lin initiated an international concert tour starting in 2013: "Echo aus Wien", piano duo at the Klimt Villa in Vienna in late August; "Wonderful Melody", cembalo and piano recital at the Tianjin Concert Hall in Tianjin in October; "Accolades to Classics", piano recital at the Central Music Conservatory Concert Hall in Beijing in November; "Wonderful Melody", this time a piano recital at Bach Hall in Taipei in February 2014; "Beauty of Classics from Vienna", piano recital at the Minnan Grand Theater in Xiamen in April; and finally, "The Charming Classics", piano recital at the Shanghai Concert Hall in Shanghai in early July 2014. Altogether more than 4,000 people attended her performances of that concert tour.

== Education and playing style ==
"Music is a language that can only rise from harmonized spirituality, passing from one generation to the next, and the most beautiful among all languages created by the humankind." —— Christiana Lin

In addition to performing, Lin founded Cantabile Piano Music Group in 1994, in the spirit of "I play, we play". As the artistic director, she has held three Christiana Lin's Piano Education Seminar and Master Classes and 17 Cantabile Piano Master Class Concerts in order to create a stage for aspiring young artists to present their talent. Among all the master class concerts, the eleventh was 2008 Cantabile Piano German Master Class in that she took the role of artistic director. She invited Chancellor of the Hochschule für Musik und Theater Hamburg, pianist and Prof. Dr. Siegfried Mauser, French-German pianist Prof. Claude-France Journès, and vocalist Prof. Ingrid Kremling to teach master classes in Taipei.

== Writings ==
In 2001, specifically for writing the book J.S. Bach Sechs Partiten BWV 825–830 Analysis und Interpretation, Lin went to do research at the Bach-Archiv in Leipzig. This is the first book on the subject written in Chinese.

In 2003, she compiled her past speeches and her personal teaching experiences and had them published in three books: The Glory of Baroque Keyboard Music, Enlightenment in Your Capacity for Understanding Music, and Understanding the Humanism in Music.
