= Peter Schmidl =

Austrian clarinetist (1941–2025)

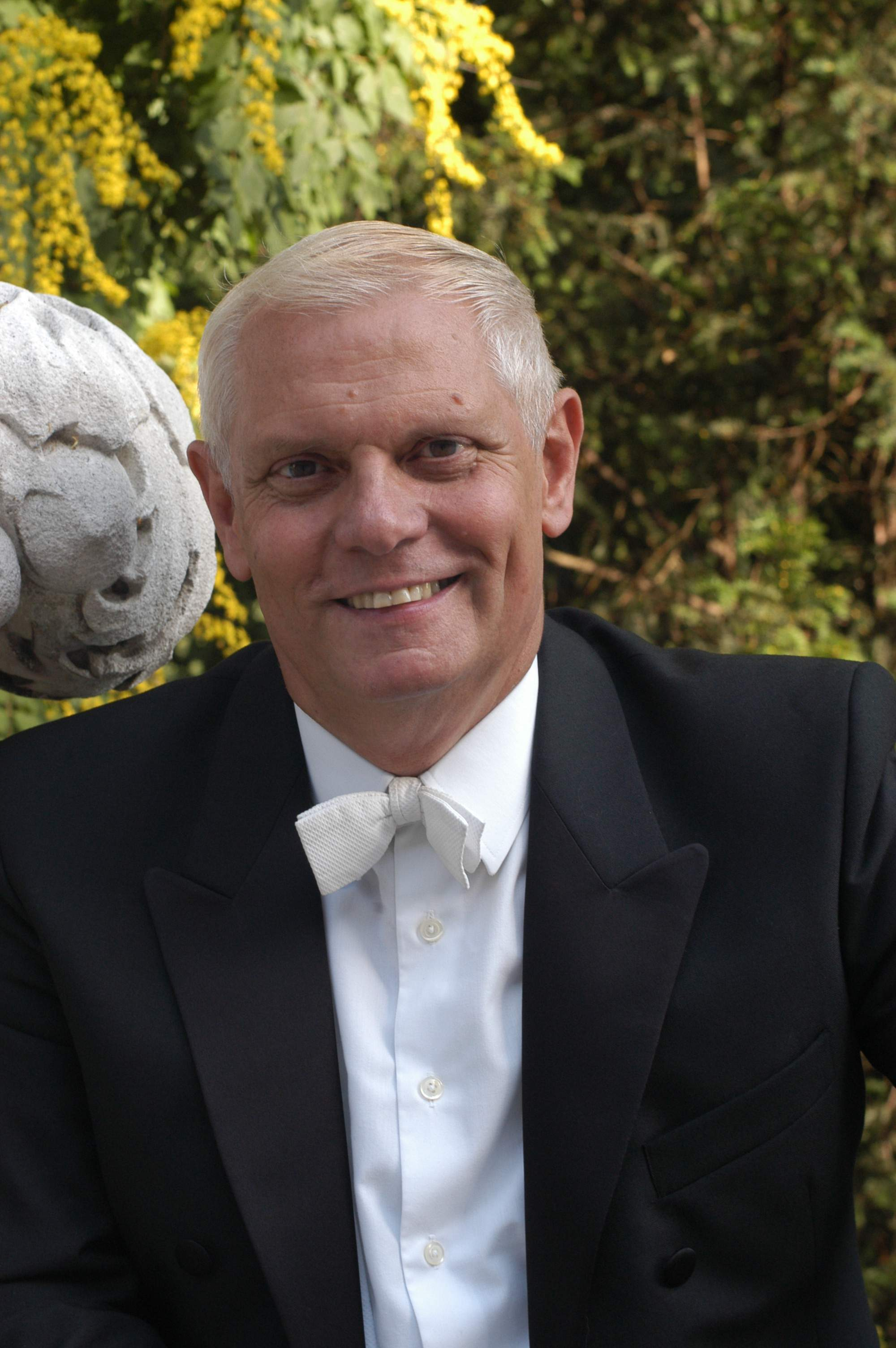
Peter Schmidl

Peter Schmidl (10 January 1941 – 1 February 2025) was an Austrian clarinetist.

== Life and career ==
Schmidl was born in Olomouc, Protectorate of Bohemia and Moravia on 10 January 1941. He studied clarinet with Rudolf Jettel at the University of Music and Performing Arts, Vienna. He was the principal clarinetist of the Vienna Philharmonic Orchestra. He has played with the MDR Orchestra, the Salzburg Mozarteum Orchestra, and the Tokyo New Philharmonia. He taught at the University of Music and Performing Arts, Vienna since 1967. Among his students are several internationally renowned clarinetists, including Johann Hindler, Leonhard Kubizek, Ernst Ottensamer, Daniel Ottensamer, Ferdinand Steiner, and Wenzel Fuchs. Schmidl died on 1 February 2025, at the age of 84.

== Selected discography ==
- Johannes Brahms: Clarinet Trio in A minor, Op. 114, with András Schiff (Piano) and Friedrich Dolezal (Cello), Decca, 1982
- W. A. Mozart: Clarinet Concerto in A Major, KV 622, with Leonard Bernstein and Vienna Philharmonic, Deutsche Grammophon, 1987
- Richard Strauss: Duet concertino for clarinet and bassoon, with André Previn and Vienna Philharmonic, Deutsche Grammophon, 1996
- Johannes Brahms: Clarinet Sonatas, Robert Schumann: Fantasiestücke, Op. 73, Alban Berg: Vier Stücke, Op. 5, with Bruno Canino, Camerata Tokyo, 1997
- Ludwig van Beethoven: Piano Trio in B-flat major, Op. 11, "Gassenhauer", Piano Trio in E-flat major, Op. 38, with Anthony Spiri (Piano) and Ko Iwasaki (Cello). Camerata Tokyo, 2004
- Franz Schubert: Octet in F Major, D 803, with Gunter Hogner (horn), Milan Turkovic (bassoon), Milan Sagat (double bass) and The Vienna String Quartet, Camerata Tokyo, 2004
- Archduke Rudolf of Austria: Works for Clarinet, with Tomoko Okada (Piano), Tamás Varga (Cello). Camerata Tokyo, 2016
- Classical Bliss, with various artists. Naxos, 2009
- Mozart: Clarinet Concerto / Symphony No. 25, with the Vienna Philharmonic Orchestra. Naxos, 2006
- Chill with Beethoven, with various artists. Naxos, 2006
- Beethoven for Meditation, with various artists. Naxos, 2005
- The Art of the Clarinet, with Madoka Inui, Teodora Miteva and Pierre Pichler. Naxos, 2003

== Decorations and awards ==
- Gold Medal of the Province of Salzburg
- Honorary Ring of the Vienna Philharmonic
- Grand Decoration of Honour for Services to the Republic of Austria (1999)
- Large golden belt of the Vienna Ambulance
- Cross of Honour of Cultural Merit of the Republic of Romania
- Appointment as Special Advisor for Cultural Exchange by the Japanese Ministry of Culture
- Mozart Silver Medal at the International Mozarteum Foundation
- Austrian Cross of Honour for Science and Art, 1st class (2008)
