= Josef Weinheber =

German poet and essayist

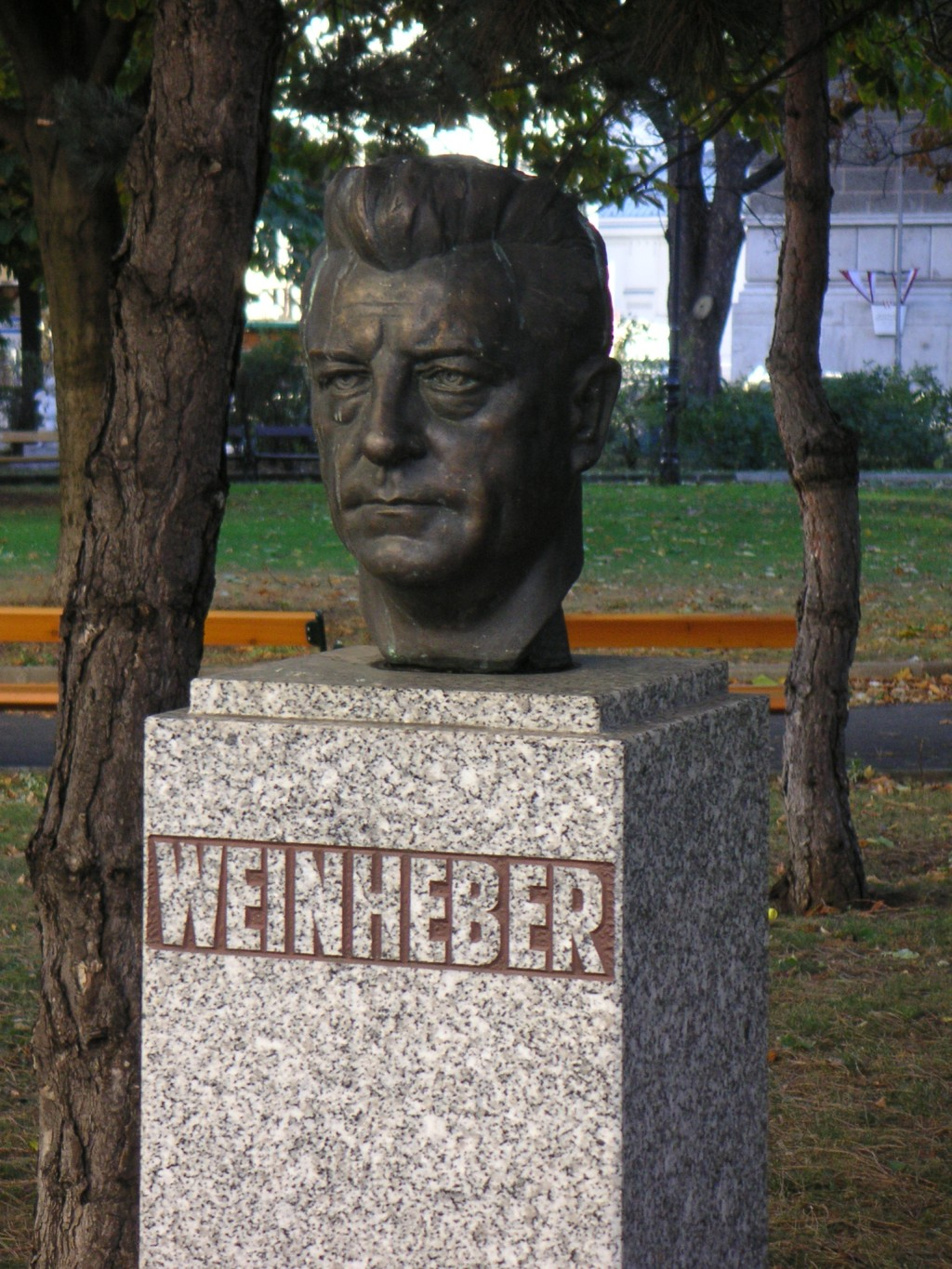
Statue of Weinheber in the Schillerplatz (Vienna)

Josef Weinheber (9 March 1892 in Vienna – 8 April 1945 in Kirchstetten, Lower Austria) was an Austrian lyric poet, narrative writer and essayist.

== Life ==
Brought up in an orphanage, Weinheber was, before his authorial career, a casual labourer, and from 1911 to 1918 a postal service worker. In 1919 he made contributions to the newspaper The Musket. In 1918 he left the Roman Catholic Church became agnostic. In 1927 Weinheber became Protestant, however on October 26, 1944 he became Roman Catholic again.

In 1920 his first volume of lyric poetry appeared, Der einsame Mensch (The Solitary Man). Weinheber was principally under the literary influence of Rainer Maria Rilke, Anton Wildgans and Karl Kraus. He was on friendly terms with his author-colleagues Mirko Jelusich and Robert Hohlbaum. From 1931 until 1933 and from 1944 until his death, Weinheber was a member of the Nazi Party. He had strong antisemitic beliefs, and thought the Jews were responsible for his lack of recognition. An example is a letter in 1933 to Jelusich, an Austrian Nazi culture official: "It's not my fault that the Jews keep silent about me ... that for 20 years they have prevented me from coming into prominence and making a name for myself.” In the same letter he offered to make his "talents as an artist available to the [Nazi] movement," and asked Jelusich to find an appropriate place for him in it. Weinheber held positions in various Nazi cultural organizations designed not only to explain ideology but also help the careers of Nazi artists.

With the publication of his volume of poems Adel und Untergang (Nobility and Ruin), he became one of the most distinguished poets of his time. Especially admired was the volume Wien wörtlich (Vienna Verbatim), which is partially written in Viennese dialect. However, the forty odes comprising the cycle "Zwischen Göttern und Dämonen" (Between Gods and Demons) of 1938 are considered his poetical masterpiece.

The NSDAP publishers Langen-Müller introduced Weinheber to the lucrative German market, and he was invited on extensive reading tours in the Altreich and awarded a prize for foreign German writers. After 1938 he wrote numerous Nazi propaganda poems, such as "Hymnus auf die Heimkehr" ("Hymn to Austria's return"), "Dem Führer" ("To the führer"), and "Ode an die Straßen Adolf Hitlers" ("Ode to the streets of Adolf Hitler"), and became the most-read contemporary poet in Nazi Germany. He received numerous honors and awards, and was included by Adolf Hitler on the list of 1,041 Gottbegnadeten or "divinely gifted" Nazi artists who were exempt from war service on account of their cultural importance.

Falling prey to alcohol during the later events of the War, he committed suicide in April 1945 by taking an overdose of morphine at the time of the advancing Red Army and Germany's impending defeat. He was buried in the village of Kirchstetten, Austria, where he lived from 1936. Part of his house there, located on Josef Weinheber-Straße, has been preserved as a museum in his honour.

The English poet W. H. Auden, who spent summers in Kirchstetten from 1958 until 1973, wrote a poem titled "Josef Weinheber." Auden acknowledges Weinheber's support of Nazism but also records his reply to Nazi propaganda minister Joseph Goebbels' offer to enrich Austrian culture: "in Ruah lossen" ("leave us alone"). Auden's poem appears in his Collected Poems.

Composer Mimi Wagensonner set 13 of Weinheber's poems to music.

Weinheber was friend to the Austrian writer Carl Julius Haidvogel.

== Distinctions and honours ==
- 1936 Wolfgang Amadeus Mozart Prize
- 1941 Grillparzer Prize (jointly with Mirko Jelusich)

== Works ==
- Der einsame Mensch, (The Solitary Man, poems) 1920
- Von beiden Ufern, (Of Both Shores, poems) 1923
- Das Waisenhaus, (The Orphanage, Novel) 1924
- Boot in der Bucht, (Boat in the Bay, poems) 1926
- Adel und Untergang, (Nobility and Ruin, poems) 1934
- Wien wörtlich, (Vienna Verbatim, poems) 1935
- Vereinsamtes Herz, (The Heart made Lonely, poems) 1935
- Späte Krone, (Belated Crown, poems) 1936
- O Mensch, gib acht!, (Mankind, Take heed!, poems) 1937 (ein erbauliches Kalenderbuch für Stadt- und Landleute)
- Selbstbildnis, (Self-portrait, poems) 1937
- Zwischen Göttern und Dämonen, (Between Gods and Demons, poems) 1938
- Kammermusik, (Chamber-music, poems) 1939
- Dokumente des Herzens, (Documents of the Heart, poems) 1944
- Hier ist das Wort, (Here is the Word, poems) 1947

== Sources ==
- Albert Berger, Josef Weinheber (1892–1945). Leben und Werk - Leben im Werk (Salzburg: Müller 1999). ISBN 3-7013-1003-3
- Albert Berger, 'Götter, Dämonen und Irdische: Josef Weinhebers dichterische Metaphysik', In: Klaus Amann und Albert Berger (Eds.): Österreichische Literatur der dreissiger Jahre (Vienna, etc.: Böhlau 1985). ISBN 3-205-07252-9
- W. H. Auden, "Josef Weinheber." Collected Poems (New York: Modern Library, 2007). ISBN 978-0-679-64350-0
- Harry Bergholz, Josef Weinheber. Bibliographie (Bad Bocklet etc.: Krieg 1953). (= Bibliotheca bibliographica 14).
- Christoph Fackelmann, Die Sprachkunst Josef Weinhebers und ihre Leser. Annäherungen an die Werkgestalt in wirkungsgeschichtlicher Perspektive (Vienna/Münster 2005). ISBN 3-8258-8620-4
- Jan Zimmermann, Die Kulturpreise der Stiftung F.V.S. 1935 - 1945. Darstellung und Dokumentation. Edited by the Alfred-Toepfer-Stiftung F.V.S. (Hamburg, Christians 2000).
- Fritz Feldner, Josef Weinheber. Eine Dokumentation in Bild und Wort (Salzburg etc., Das Berglandbuch 1965).
- Edmund Finke, Josef Weinheber. Der Mensch und das Werk (Salzburg etc., Pilgram 1950).
- Friedrich Heer, 'Josef Weinheber aus Wien,' in: Frankfurter Hefte 8, (1953), pp. 590–602.
- Rudolf Ibel, Mensch der Mitte. George - Carossa - Weinheber (Hamburg,: Holstein Verlag 1962).
- Friedrich Jenaczek, Josef Weinheber 1892-1945. Exhibition set up by the Josef Weinheber Society in the Austrian National Library, 7 December 1995 to 31 Jänner 1996. (Kirchstetten: Josef Weinheber Society 1995).
- Paul Anton Keller, Dreigestirn. Josef Weinheber, Max Mell, Josef Friedrich Perkonig. Begegnungen. Erinnerungen (Maria-Rain, Petrei 1963).
- Franz Koch, Josef Weinheber (München, Langen/Müller 1942).
- Dietrich Kralik, Josef Weinheber. Ehrendoktor der Philosophie der Universität Wien (Vienna, Verlag der Ringbuchhandlung anno 1943). (= Wiener wissenschaftliche Vorträge und Reden; 5)
- Eduard Kranner, Als er noch lebte. Erinnerungen an Josef Weinheber. (Krems, Faber 1967).
- Walter Marinovic, Deutsche Dichtung aus Österreich. Schönherr - Weinheber - Waggerl. (Vienna, Österr. Landsmannschaft 1997). (= Eckartschriften; 143)
- Josef Nadler, Josef Weinheber. Geschichte seines Lebens und seiner Dichtung (Salzburg, O. Müller 1952).
- Heinrich Zillich (Ed.), Bekenntnis zu Josef Weinheber. Erinnerungen seiner Freunde (Salzburg, Akad. Gemeinschaftsverlag 1950).
