= Robert Hohlbaum =

German writer (1886–1955)

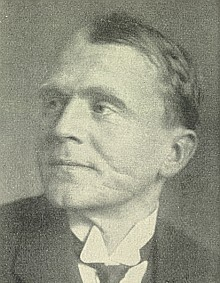
Robert Hohlbaum

Robert Hohlbaum (28 August 1886 – 4 February 1955) was an Austrian-German librarian, writer, and playwright. He was born as a son of an industrialist Alois Hohlbaum in what is now Krnov in the Czech Republic, then part of the Austro-Hungarian Empire and known by its German name, Jägerndorf.

Hohlbaum studied at Graz and Vienna and received his doctorate from the University of Vienna in 1910. He gained employment as a scientific librarian, but maintained an avocation as a writer, writing principally for the journal Muskete, along with Mirko Jelusich and Rudolf Hans Bartsch. Hohlbaum was a nationalist and became an officer in the Austrian army during World War I. After the war was over he became involved with the Austrian wing of the right-wing German People's Party.

In 1933 Hohlbaum moved to Germany, where he became a citizen in 1937. He was a friend of Josef Weinheber. He thrived during the Third Reich, becoming first the director of the municipal library at Duisburg and later, in 1942, that of the state library at Weimar (now the Duchess Anna Amalia Library).

In disgrace after the war, Hohlbaum was able after a number of attempts to return to Austria in 1951. He settled first in Vienna, and later in Graz, where he died in 1955. His most significant work after the war ended was a book on Anton Bruckner, Tedeum.

== Works ==
- Der ewige Lenzkampf, 1913
- Deutsche Gedichte. A Cycle, 1916
- Unsterbliche. Novellas, 1919
- Die Amouren des Magister Döderlein, 1920
- Grenzland, 1921
- Franz Karl Ginzkey. His Life and Work, 1921
- Fallbeil und Reifrock. New Noverllas, 1921
- Zukunft. Novel, 1922
- Himmlisches Orchester, 1923
- Die deutsche Passion, 1924
- Der wilde Christian. Novel, 1925
- Die Pfingsten von Weimar, 1926
- Die Raben des Kyffhäuser. The Novel of the Burschenschaft und their Age, 1927
- Das Paradies und die Schlange. A Novel from South Tyrol, 1928
- Winterbrautnacht. Novellas, 1929
- Das klingende Gift, 1930
- Deutsches Leid in Österreich, 1930
- Die Stunde der Sterne. A Bruckner Novella, 1930
- König Volk, 1931
- Der Mann aus dem Chaos. A Napoleon Novel, 1933
- Die Flucht in den Krieg, 1935
- Der Held von Kolberg, 1935
- Zweikampf um Deutschland. Novel, 1936
- Fröhlicher Vormärz. Two Novellas, 1936
- Grillparzer, 1938
- Die stumme Schlacht. Novel, 1939
- Der Kurfürst, 1940
- Heroische Rheinreise, Novelle, 1941
- Die Königsparade, 1942
- Balladen vom Geist, 1943
- Das letzte Gefecht, 1943
- Symphonie in drei Sätzen. Novellas, 1943
- Tedeum, 1950
- Jesus-Legende, 1951
- Der Heiratsvermittler, 1953
- Der Zauberstab. Novel of Viennese Musical Life, 1954
- Des reifsten Weines später Segen, 1967
