= Stephanie Goldner =

Austria-American harpist (1896–1962)

- Goldner in 1930

Background information
- Born: February 9, 1896; Vienna, Austria-Hungary
- Died: November 18, 1962 (aged 66) San Francisco, California, U.S.
- Occupation: Musician
- Instrument: Harp
- Formerly of: New York Philharmonic (1922–1932); Minneapolis Symphony Orchestra (Soloist)
- Spouse: Eugene Ormandy (m. 1922; div. 1947)

Stephanie Goldner (February 9, 1896 – November 18, 1962) was an Austrian-American harpist and the first female member of the New York Philharmonic. Known professionally as Steffy Goldner, she had a successful career in the concert hall and on radio. She was a member of the New York Philharmonic from 1922 to 1932 and toured the United States and Europe with the orchestra.

== Early life and education ==
Goldner was born in 1896 to Desider Goldner and Emma Adler Goldner in Vienna, Austria. At age eight, she took lessons from the Austrian writer and harpist Vicki Baum. Her brother Hermann, and sisters, Julia and Gertrude, were also musicians. She attended the Vienna Academy of Music, now the University of Music and Performing Arts Vienna, for four years.

== Career ==
Goldner performed as a harp soloist in Vienna, starting in 1912 at the age of 16, and also performed chamber music with her sisters, touring England and Germany. Conductor Oskar Nedbal of the Wiener Tonkünstler-Orchester and conductor Wilhelm Bruch of the Philharmonisches Orchester Nürnberg, now Staatsphilharmonie Nürnberg, both praised her work and wrote letters of recommendation. In 1921, she went to New York City and became the first female member of the orchestra at the Capitol Theatre, a Broadway movie palace. There she met Eugene Ormandy, then concertmaster of the orchestra, who later became her husband. In the fall of 1922, at age 26, she was asked to join the New York Philharmonic as the second harp player and became its first female member. At that time, the orchestra was led by conductor Willem Mengelberg; starting in 1926 it was led by conductor Arturo Toscanini. In 1930, she traveled with the philharmonic aboard the ocean liner SS De Grasse on its first international tour to Europe, with her harp in a special traveling case. In addition to Europe, she toured the United States with the philharmonic nine times. In 1932, she left the philharmonic to accompany her husband to Minneapolis, Minnesota, where he had been named conductor. On April 15, 1932, the final concert of the season for the Minneapolis Symphony Orchestra, she was the featured soloist for the Concerto for Flute, Harp, and Orchestra by Mozart. The concerto, featuring her as a soloist, was repeated the next season, on February 19, 1933. In addition to the concert hall, Goldner could be heard on the radio, including the WABC and WEAF stations. She appeared both as a soloist and with her husband for violin and harp duets.

In an article about Goldner in 1931, her ninth season with the philharmonic, the author Juliet Danziger noted her accomplishments:

... the harp is one of the most difficult instruments of the orchestra to play. There are forty-seven strings which must be continually tuned and seven pedals, each of which has three positions to be manipulated ... Thus for a woman to have achieved such success as a harpist is no mean accomplishment.

== Personal life ==
On August 8, 1922, Goldner married the violinist and conductor Eugene Ormandy. In 1932, she moved to Minneapolis where her husband was the conductor of the Minneapolis Symphony Orchestra. In 1936, she moved to Philadelphia, Pennsylvania, where he was conductor of the Philadelphia Orchestra. They divorced in 1947. She died in 1962 from pancreatic cancer, while living with her sister, Julia Goldner Elbogen, in California.

== Legacy ==
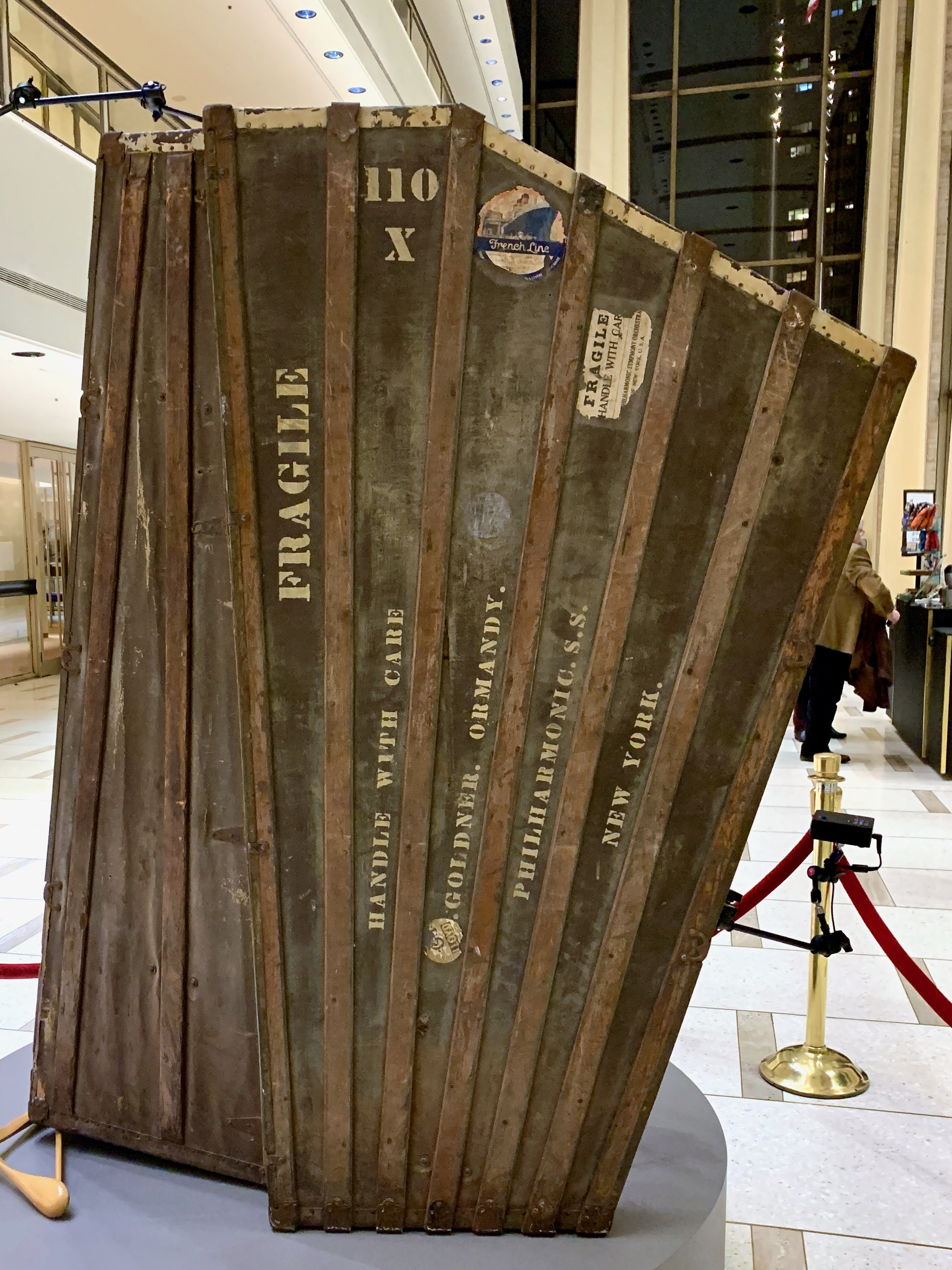
The Special Case of Steffy Goldner

In February 2020, the New York Philharmonic Archives displayed The Special Case of Steffy Goldner, a multimedia exhibit designed by Swiss/Austrian artist Nives Widauer, in David Geffen Hall for performances of the philharmonic. The exhibit featured the original traveling case for her harp, instrumental to her professional career and legacy. The case was needed for her tours in the United States and Europe and then for this exhibit of her life. On March 5, the exhibit was displayed at the Austrian Embassy in Washington, D.C., part of the program to celebrate International Women's Day. In March 2022, it was displayed at the New-York Historical Society. By November, one hundred years after Goldner joined the New York Philharmonic, the number of women members outnumbered the men.

== Discography ==
The Discography of American Historical Recordings lists four recordings for Goldner on harp and her husband on violin. Two recordings are available on Spotify:

- Humoresques, Op. 101, B. 187: No. 7, Poco lento e grazioso, by Antonín Dvořák
- Souvenir in D Major, by František Drdla

Two recordings are violin and harp duets:

- "Holy, Holy, Holy!"
- "Abide with Me"

== See also ==
- List of University of Music and Performing Arts Vienna alumni
- Women in music
