= Dávid Paška =

Slovak theater director, playwright, and writer (born 1999)

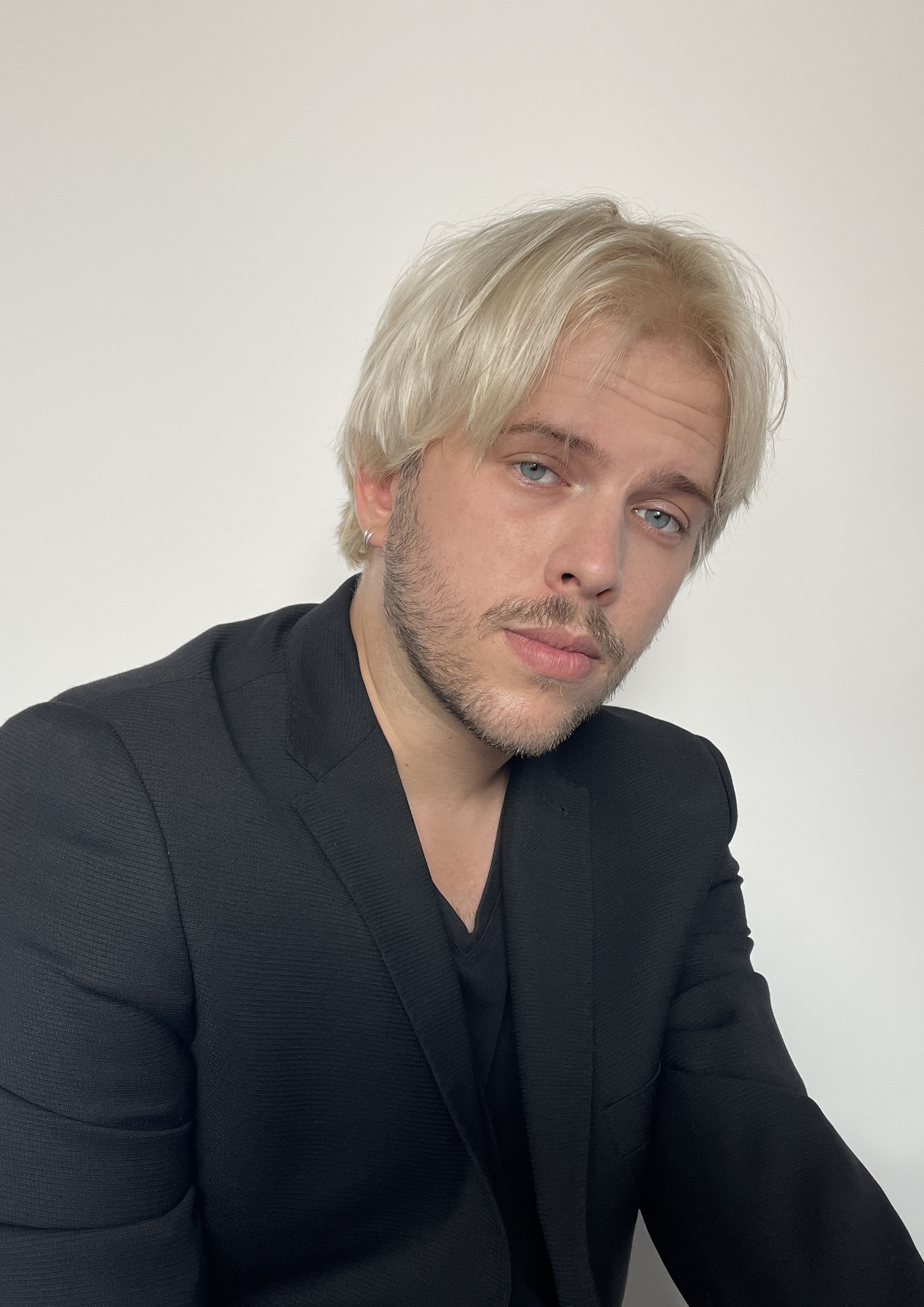
- Born: 18 May 1999 (age 27); Bratislava, Slovakia
- Education: Max Reinhardt Seminar in Vienna
- Occupations: Theatre director, playwright, writer
- Website: www.davidpaska.com/en/

Dávid Paška (born 18 May 1999) is a Slovak theatre director, playwright and writer.

== Life ==
Paška was born 18 May 1999 in Bratislava. After working as an assistant in several Prague theatres, he studied theatre directing at the Max Reinhardt Seminar in Vienna (mdw – University of Music and Performing Arts Vienna) from 2018 to 2022, where his professors included Anna Maria Krassnigg, David Bösch, Dušan David Pařízek and Martin Kušej.

Since completing his studies, Paška has worked as a theatre director, playwright and author of stage adaptations. His work encompasses classical and contemporary drama, literary adaptations and interdisciplinary theatre projects. He has directed productions at theatres in Slovakia and abroad, including Ein Jedermann at the Radu Stanca National Theatre in Sibiu (2022), NA.TU.R.AL in Linz (2022), Don Karlos at Kasematten Wiener Neustadt (2023), 1984 at Schauspielhaus Salzburg (2024), and Tatarka at the Slovak National Theatre (2024). His more recent work includes Negatívy snehu: Wetzler, Vrba, Schulman, Lux (2025), an international co-production involving Divadlo Jána Palárika in Trnava, the Jan Kochanowski Theatre in Opole and the Academy for Theatre and Digitality in Dortmund, and Jak se stát jiným (2026), a stage adaptation of novels by Édouard Louis, directed by Paška at Prague's Komedie Theatre.

Several of his productions have been presented at international theatre festivals. These include Das Schweigen by Nathalie Sarraute at the Körber Studio Junge Regie festival in Hamburg (2022); Ein Jedermann by Thomas Perle, based on Hugo von Hofmannsthal's Jedermann, at the Sibiu International Theatre Festival (FITS) in Romania (2022); Odysea by Roland Schimmelpfennig at the Kutná Hora Theatre Festival in the Czech Republic (2024); Tatarka at the Nová dráma/New Drama festival in Bratislava (2025), where it received the Student Jury Award; and Jak se stát jiným, based on the novels of Édouard Louis and adapted by Paška for Prague's Komedie Theatre, which was included in the programme of the Drama Queer festival in Bratislava (2026).

Since November 2026, Paška has also served as Artistic Director of Malá scéna Theatre in Bratislava.

=== Education ===
He completed a diploma in directing at the Max Reinhardt Seminar Institute for Acting and Directing at the mdw – University of Music and Performing Arts Vienna.

== Awards ==
- 2026: Tatra Bank Foundation Award for Arts 2025 – Young Artist for directing the productions Tatarka, The Bloody Sonnets, and Negatívy snehu: Wetzler, Vrba, Schulman, Lux.
- 2025: Divadelné Dosky Awards 2025 – nominated for Best Production of the Season and Outstanding Achievement in Drama Theatre for Negatívy snehu: Wetzler, Vrba, Schulman, Lux.[10]
- 2025: Tatra Banka Foundation Art Award 2024: Young Creator Award for directing of the production The Odyssey – Roland Schimmelpfennig
- 2025: Festival NEW DRAMA Prize 2025 – Student Jury Award for the production of Tatarka – by Dávid Paška after Dominik Tatarka.

== Directed productions (selection) ==
- 2026: The Merchant of Venice/Mauser – William Shakespeare / Heiner Müller, P. O. Hviezdoslav Theatre (Slovakia).
- 2026: Jak se stát jiným – Édouard Louis, Městská divadla pražská – Divadlo Komedie (Czech Republic).
- 2026: Saved – Edward Bond, Arena Theatre (Slovakia).
- 2025: Endsieg // Dobytie – by Elfriede Jelinek, Malá scéna STU (Slovakia).
- 2025: Snow Negatives: A Trilogy (Lux / Schulman / Wetzler–Vrba) – by Dávid Paška after Alfréd Wetzler, Faye Schulman, Štefan Lux and Rüdiger Strempel. Co-production: Jan Palarik Theatre, JK Opole Theatre, Academy for Theatre and Digitality Dortmund and others (Slovakia, Poland, Germany).
- 2025: The Bloody Sonnets – by Pavol Országh Hviezdoslav, P. O. Hviezdoslav Theatre and La MaMa Experimental Theatre Club (Slovakia, U.S.).
- 2024: TATARKA – Dávid Paška after Dominik Tatarka, Slovak National Theatre (Slovakia)
- 2024: 1984 – Tabea Baumann based on George Orwell, Schauspielhaus Salzburg (Austria)
- 2024: The Odyssey – Roland Schimmelpfennig, Bratislava (Slovakia)
- 2023: Don Carlos – Friedrich Schiller, Wortwiege (Austria)
- 2023: The Adventures of a Mad King – György Ligeti, Sir Peter Maxwell Davies, Academie-theatre-musique, Theatre de Nimes (France)
- 2022: NAT.U.R.AL – Dávid Paška after Karel Čapek, Theater Zirkus des Wissens and Johannes Keppler University, Linz (Austria)
- 2022: one everyman – Thomas Perle after Hugo von Hofmannsthal, National Theatre Radu Stanca, Sibiu (Romania)
- 2021: The Silence – Nathalie Sarraute, Schlosstheater Schönbrunn (Austria)
- 2021: Nomos Faustus – Thomas Mann, Josef Matthias Hauer, Arnold Schönberg, co-production of the Max Reinhardt Seminar with isaFestival, Kasematten Wiener Neustadt
- 2020: The Bacchae – Euripides – undergraduate production, Max Reinhardt Seminar
- Roberto Zucco – Bernard-Marie Koltes, directing internship, MRS
- The Good Person of Szechwan – Bertolt Brecht, directing internship, MRS
- Ubu – Alfred Jarry, directing internship, MRS
- Babel – Elfriede Jelinek, directing internship, MRS

== Performance of own text ==
- 2026: Jak se stát jiným – adaptation by Dávid Paška after three novels by Édouard Louis: Change: A Method, A Woman's Battles and Transformations and Monique Escapes.
- 2025: Snow Negatives: A trilogy ((Lux / Schulman / Wetzler-Vrba) – Jan Palárik Theatre, JK Opole Theatre, Academy for Theatre and Digitality Dortmund, among others, (Slovakia, Poland, Germany)
- 2024: TATARKA – Slovak National Theatre, Bratislava (Slovakia)
- 2022: NAT.U.R.AL – Theater Zirkus des Wissens, Linz, (Austria)
- 2022: Tenká línia povedomia – Theater LUDUS, Bratislava (Slovakia)
- 2017: Kým nacionalista zakikiríka – Slovač Woodstock, Theater Znudyľudu, Bratislava (Slovakia)
- 2015: NUSICA – Ludus school, Bratislava (Slovakia)

== Published texts ==
- 2021: Nomos črepín a vrások – poetry collection
- 2017: V roztrieštenom procese – poetry collection
- 2017: Kým nacionalista zakikiríka – theatre play

== Participation in international festivals ==
- 2026: Festival Dotyky a spojenia, Martin (Slovakia): Snow Negatives: A Trilogy – Dávid Paška.
- 2026: Mezinárodní divadelní festival REGIONY, Hradec Králové (Czech Republic): Snow Negatives: A Trilogy – Dávid Paška.
- 2026: Divadelní svět Brno (Czech Republic): Snow Negatives: A Trilogy – Dávid Paška.
- 2026: Festival Nová komedie (Czech Republic): Endsieg – Elfriede Jelinek.
- 2025: New Drama Festival (Slovakia): TATARKA – Dávid Paška after Dominik Tatarka.
- 2025: Festival DSB (Czech Republic): The Odyssey – Roland Schimmelpfennig.
- 2024: Festival Kutná Hora (Czech Republic): The Odyssey – Roland Schimmelpfennig.
- 2022: Sibiu International Theatre Festival (FITS), Romania: one everyman – Thomas Perle after Hugo von Hofmannsthal.
- 2022: Körber Studio Junge Regie Hamburg (Germany): The Silence – Nathalie Sarraute.
