= Max Reinhardt Seminar =

Drama school in Vienna, Austria

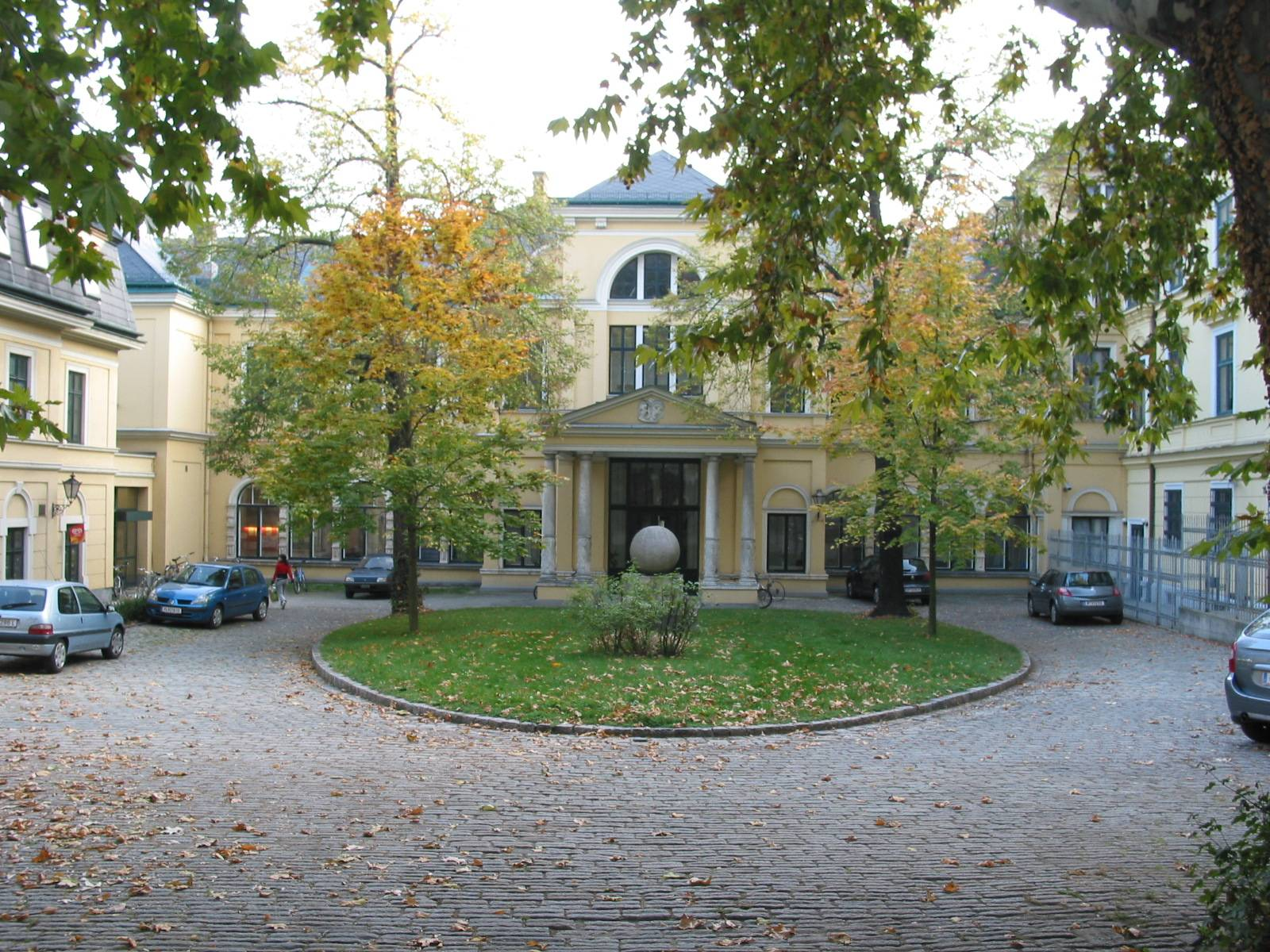
Reinhardt Seminar in Palais Cumberland

The Max Reinhardt Seminar (Reinhardt Seminar) is the School of Drama at the University of Music and Performing Arts in Vienna, Austria. It is located in the Palais Cumberland, Penzingerstraße 9, in Vienna's 14th district (48°11′21″N 16°18′44″E).

== History ==
A Lehrgang für Declamation und Mimik (Course in Declamation and Mimics) had been in existence in Vienna since 1852, when Max Reinhardt received a call from the University of Music and Performing Arts in 1929 to create a drama seminar. Initially, this Seminar was taught at the Schlosstheater Schönbrunn, the imperial theatre in the Schönbrunn Palace. After Reinhardt's emigration in 1937, the seminar moved to the nearby Palais Cumberland in 1940. From 1948 until 1954, Helene Thimig (Reinhardt's widow) directed the Seminar.

== Curriculum ==
The Seminar offers a four-year course taught by some 40 professors, many of whom are themselves notable actors and directors, e.g. Karlheinz Hackl, Heiner Müller, Oleg Tabakov, Giorgio Strehler, István Szabó, Klaus Maria Brandauer. After the second semester, the students specialize into various branches of acting and directing. Student performances are staged at the Schlosstheater.

== Alumni ==
- Dávid Paška, Slovak playwright
- Florian Teichtmeister, Austrian actor

== See also ==
- Hochschule für Schauspielkunst "Ernst Busch" in Berlin
- Max Reinhardt Workshop
- Max Reinhardt Junior Workshop
- The Continental Players
