= Heinrich Schalit =

Austrian–American, Jewish musician (1886–1976)

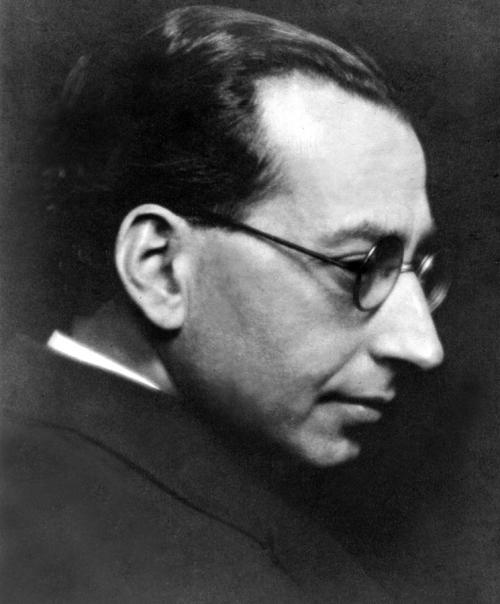
- Schalit c. 1920
- Born: January 2, 1886; Vienna, Austria
- Died: February 3, 1976 (aged 90); Evergreen, Colorado, US
- Occupations: Composer; organist
- Works: Freitagabend-Liturgie; Seelenlieder
- Parents: Joseph Schalit (father); Josefine Fischer (mother)

Heinrich Schalit (January 2, 1886 – February 3, 1976) was an Austrian-American, Jewish composer and musician; best known for his sacred music, art songs, and chamber music. Along with other Jewish composers such as Isadore Freed, Hugo Chaim Adler and Abraham Binder, Schalit modernized Jewish sacred music in the first half of the 20th century. His most popular work is Freitagabend-Liturgie (Friday Evening Liturgy).

== Life and career ==
=== Education ===
Heinrich Schalit was born in Vienna, Austria on January 2, 1886 to Joseph Schalit and Josefine Fischer. He had four siblings, including first secretary of the Zionist Office, Isidor Schalit. Schalit began his musical education and career without any connection or influence to Jewish music. He studied organ, piano and composition privately in 1898 with Josef Labor; and in 1903 he began studying at the Conservatory of Music and Performing Arts in Vienna. His teachers included Polish pianist Theodor Leschetizky and composer Robert Fuchs. In 1906, he graduated and received the Austrian State Prize for Students of Composition for his Piano Quartet in E minor. Schalit moved to Munich in 1907, where he worked as a private music teacher and composed numerous works; primarily post-romantic songs and chamber music, including the works Jugendland, Six Love Songs and Six Spring Songs.

=== Influence on Jewish music ===
Between 1916 and 1920, driven by the political events of the time, Schalit began to focus more on Jewish music. He saw himself as a Jewish composer motivated by Zionism. In a letter to Anita Hepner, Schalit wrote:

[… between] 1928 and 1932, when there was no composer of Jewish birth who could have even thought of writing music with a consciously Jewish heartbeat, I was already a well-known composer of Jewish religious music [...] as a conscious Jewish musician and Zionist I considered it my duty to convince him [Paul Ben-Haim] of the necessity of devoting his talent to Jewish music and culture“.

On a list of compositions in 1936, Schalit wrote: "1916, Beginning of the creative period of music of Jewish content and character."

=== Liturgical music ===
At the end of the 1920s, Schalit began to study Jewish liturgical music. In his opinion, Jewish liturgical music was characterized by a romantic and operatic style, as in the works of Louis Lewandowski and Salomon Sulzer, and called for a resurgence and modernization; being based on authentic Jewish musical traditions while still integrating elements of 20th-century music. Schalit stated his displeasure with what he deemed an “unorganic mixture of traditional cantorial chants with congregational and choral music in the German style of the 19th century." His ambition was to "create a new, unified liturgical music growing out of the soil of the old-new, significant and valuable source material." The result of these aspirations was his Freitagabend-Liturgie for cantor, unison and mixed choir, and organ (Opus 29), which premiered in 1932. In this work, Schalit also incorporated Jewish-Oriental melodies (Hebrew-Oriental Melodienschatz). The work was highly praised by musicologists such as Alfred Einstein, Curt Sachs, and Hugo Leichtentritt. During the early days of National Socialism, publishing the work was considered too risky, so Schalit published it himself.

=== Compositional style ===
In his music, Schalit avoided the harmonic conventions of 19th-century music by relying more on modal elements. His musical style utilized controlled dissonances within a diatonic framework. He placed greater emphasis on clear linear melodic lines than on the complex layered harmony; which was more prevalent in late Romanticism. His writing style is reminiscent of the polyphonic density of the choral and orchestral writing in many of Arnold Schoenberg's works, without Schoenberg's traditional atonality. Similar to composers like Béla Bartók and Paul Hindemith, Schalit considered the folk music traditions of individual cultural heritages and nations to be an important source of inspiration; while defining his own use of tonality in the context of the musical innovations of the 1920s. Schalit viewed modern research and the collection of Hebrew-Oriental ritual music, as collected by Jewish ethnomusicologist and composer Abraham Zevi Idelsohn, to be the incentive for the further development of synagogue music.

=== Death and legacy ===
Schalit died on February 3, 1976 in Evergreen, Colorado.

Analysis and recognition of Schalit and his music is scarce. Although, Müller's Lexikon Deutsches Musiker (Encyclopedia of German Musicians) from 1929 published a comprehensive article with a catalogue of his works from his Munich years, in the two editions of the encyclopedia Music in the Past and Present, Schalit is only mentioned briefly in the article Jewish Music.

== Selected works ==
- Ostjüdische Volkslieder, Opus 18 and 19
- Freitagabend-Liturgie; premiered on September 16, 1932, at the Lützowstrasse Synagogue in Berlin
- V'shamru
- Sh'nat olam
- Hebräischer Lobgesang
- Seelenlieder
- In Ewigkeit

== Bibliography ==
- Schalit, Heinrich. In: Werner Röder, Herbert A. Strauss (eds.): International Biographical Dictionary of Central European Emigrés 1933–1945. Volume 2, vol. 2. Saur, Munich 1983, ISBN 3-598-10089-2, p. 1022.
- Heinrich Schalit: The man and his music. Schalit, Michael. Livermore, California. ASIN: B0006E285A
- Schalit, Heinrich. In: Joseph Walk (ed.): Short Biographies on the History of the Jews 1918–1945. Saur, Munich 1988, ISBN 3-598-10477-4, p. 328.
