= Agnieszka Gertner-Polak =

- Born: 1966 (age 59–60)
- Citizenship: Polish
- Education: Hochschule für Musik und darstellende Kunst, Wien
- Occupation: Opera singer (soprano)

Agnieszka Gertner-Polak is a Polish operatic soprano. She graduated from Hochschule für Musik und darstellende Kunst, Vienna, where she studied under the direction of Leopold Spitzer.

== Discography ==
- The Most Beautiful European Christmas Carols (2015)
- Dni, które przed nami (2016)
