= Mimi Wagensonner =

Austrian composer and poet

Maria Wagensonner-Schipper (13 March 1897 – 21 August 1970), best known as Mimi Wagensonner, was an Austrian composer and poet.

Wagensonner was born in Aussig an der Elbe in what is now the Czech Republic to Franz Schipper and Maria Stangl Schipper. She had one brother and one sister. The family moved to Vienna during her childhood. She married Josef Wagensonner in 1923. She had one son (Diether) and one stepson (Hermann).

Wagensonner studied piano with A. Subak and Mannheimer; harmony with Richard Stohr; and composition with Karl Weigl at the New Vienna Conservatory. She also studied and taught at the Music Academy in Vienna (today known as the University of Music and Performing Arts Vienna).

Wagensonner set 13 poems by Josef Weinheber to music. Her other publications included:

== Music for voice or piano ==
- Adagio
- Andante
- Before NIght
- Singing Sheets for Music Education (1969)

== Poetry ==
- Die Katz von Ravenna (The Cat of Ravenna)
