= Schauspielhaus Salzburg =

Theatre in Salzburg, Austria

Coordinates: 47°47′33″N 13°03′06″E

Schauspielhaus Salzburg is a theatre in Salzburg, Austria.
