= Daniel Ottensamer =

Austrian clarinetist (born 1986)

- Born: July 26, 1986 (age 40); Vienna, Austria
- Education: University of Music and Performing Arts Vienna
- Occupation: Classical clarinetist
- Organizations: Vienna Philharmonic

Daniel Ottensamer is an Austrian clarinetist and the principal clarinet of the Vienna Philharmonic.

== Life and career ==
Born in Vienna, Ottensamer first began learning the piano in 1992, and switched to cello after two years. He then took up the clarinet, studying with Anton Hafenscher at the Music School in Perchtoldsdorf. In 2004, he began studying under Johann Hindler at the University of Music and Performing Arts Vienna. In September 2009, he was appointed first clarinetist of the Vienna State Opera Orchestra.

Ottensamer has won several prizes at various international clarinet competitions. These include the Grand Scholarship Competition of the Munich Concert Society in 2005; the Animato Foundation in Zurich in 2006; and the Carl Nielsen International Clarinet Competition in 2009. He also appeared as soloist with the Mozarteum Orchestra Salzburg, the Sofia Philharmonic, the Radio Orchestras of Cologne, Munich and Vienna, along with the Vienna Chamber Orchestra as well as the NHK Symphony Orchestra under Lorin Maazel, Adam Fischer, Ivor Bolton, and Ralf Weikert.

In 2005, Ottensamer with father Ernst and younger brother Andreas, formed the clarinet trio The Clarinotts. The ensemble gave concert tours in Austria, Germany, Italy, Japan, the United States, performed at festivals all over the world, appeared on TV and radio and in 1999 recorded a CD published by Gramola Vienna and Octavia Records.
