= Michael Murray (organist) =

American musician

- Born: March 19, 1943; Kokomo, Indiana, United States
- Died: September 1, 2024 (aged 81) Columbus, Ohio, United States
- Genres: Classical
- Occupations: Organist, writer
- Instrument: Pipe organ

Michael Murray (March 19, 1943 – September 1, 2024) was an American-born organist and writer.

== Biography ==
He was born in Kokomo, Indiana, United States.

Murray studied at Butler University and Oberlin College Conservatory of Music before entering private study with Marcel Dupré in Paris. (He was the last important student of Dupré, of whom he would later write a biography). During the 1968–69 performance season, Murray performed the complete organ works of Johann Sebastian Bach in a series of twelve recitals in Cleveland. He later commemorated the 150th birthday of César Franck by playing that composer's complete organ works in 1972. He repeated the cycle for the hundredth anniversary of Franck's death in 1990 at the Cathedral of St. John the Divine in New York City.) Murray performed in many major cities in North America including numerous appearances as a soloist with major orchestras. Critics hailed Murray's rare combination of technique, thoughtfulness, and musical feeling. He made many recordings on the Telarc label featuring the works of Bach, Franck, Camille Saint-Saëns and others.

Murray was awarded an honorary doctorate by Ohio State University in 2000. He served as a librarian in the Music and Dance Library at Ohio State University.

After previously stepping back from touring and recording, Murray finally retired in June, 2014, from St. Mark's Episcopal Church in Columbus, Ohio, where he had served as organist for 31 years. He was named organist emeritus.

Murray wrote many articles and published five books. His Marcel Dupré: The Work of a Master Organist (Northeastern University Press, ISBN 0-930350-65-0) is in its third printing. He also wrote French Masters of the Organ (Yale University Press, ISBN 0-300-07291-0) and served as editor for A Jacques Barzun Reader (HarperCollins, ISBN 0-06-093542-1). He wrote a biography of Jacques Barzun, Jacques Barzun: Portrait of a Mind (Frederic C. Beil, ISBN 1929490410).

He died at the age of 81 in Columbus, Ohio.

== Discography ==
- Bach at The Methuen Memorial Music Hall
- Bach at The First Congregational Church, Los Angeles
- A Recital of Works by Bach, Messiaen, Dupre, Widor & Franck
- Bach: The Organ At St. Andreas-Kirche, Hildesheim
- An Organ Blaster Sampler: The Best of Michael Murray
- Bach and Franck
- Bach at St. Bavo's: Concert from St. Bavo's Church, The Netherlands
- Bach at Zwolle
- Bach in Los Angeles (Toccata & Fugue in D minor)
- Bach Organ Blaster
- Bach: Organ Works
- Bach: The Organs at First Congregational Church, Los Angeles
- Ceremonial Music for Trumpet & Organ (with Rolf Smedvig)
- Dupre, Franck & Widor
- Dupre: Symphony in G minor & Rheinberger: Organ Concerto No. 1 (with the Royal Philharmonic Orchestra)
- Encores a la francaise & Poulenc: Organ Concerto (with the Atlanta Symphony Orchestra)
- Franck: The Complete Masterworks for Organ
- Jongen: Symphonie Concertante & Franck: Fantaisie in A (with the San Francisco Symphony)
- Music for Organ, Brass & Percussion (with the Empire Brass)
- Poulenc: Gloria and Concerto for Organ (with the Atlanta Symphony Orchestra)
- Saint-Saëns: Symphony No. 3 and Encores a la francaise
- Saint-Saëns: Symphony No. 3 (with the Philadelphia Orchestra)
- Saint-Saëns: Symphony No. 3 in C minor, Organ (with the Royal Philharmonic Orchestra)
- The Willis Organ at Salisbury Cathedral
- The Young Bach
- Vierne: Organ Symphonies
- Works by Franck, Widor, Dupre, Bach & others

== Bibliography ==
- 1985 Marcel Dupré: The Work of a Master Organist. Northeastern, ISBN 0-930350-65-0
- 1994 Albert Schweitzer, Musician. Scolar, ISBN 1-85928-031-5
- 1998 French Masters of the Organ. Yale, ISBN 0-300-07291-0
- 2003 Editor, A Jacques Barzun Reader: Selections from His Works. Harper, ISBN 0-06-093542-1
- 2011 Jacques Barzun: Portrait of a Mind. Frederic C. Beil, ISBN 978-1-929490-41-7
