= Géza Horváth (composer) =

Hungarian composer

Géza Horváth (* May 27, 1868 in Komárom, Hungary; † July 19, 1925 in Vienna ) was a Hungarian composer, arranger and music school director who worked in Vienna.

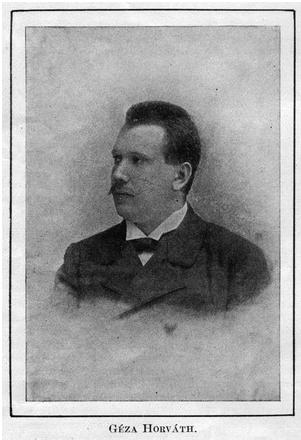
Géza Horváth

== Life ==
Géza Horváth attended music school in his hometown of Komárom and became a full-time musician at the age of 18. He studied at the Vienna Conservatory and passed the state music teacher examination in 1892. After a few years as a music teacher, Horvath opened his own private music school. Around 1911 he was active as President of the committee of licensed music school owners. After his death in 1925, the private music school Horvath (Hirschengasse 15, 1060 Vienna) was continued by his daughter Blanca Horvath.

== Compositions ==
During his time as music school director, Horvath created numerous works for learning piano and violin, which are often used in modern teaching materials to this day (e.g. Canzonetta). Horvath is considered one of the outstanding composers and arrangers for multi-handed piano playing. “The works by Wilhelm Kramer and Géza Horváth stand out from the estimated 400 pieces for piano duet in the 19th century. In their numerous original compositions and arrangements, both created a balanced piano setting with equal parts for the three piano partners." His works have been published by well-known publishers in Budapest, Vienna, Leipzig, Mainz, Wroclaw, Paris, New York, Boston and Moscow.

== Preserved works ==
- Op. 5 gypsy tunes for 4 hands. Leipzig, A.P. Schmidt. October 1898
- Op. 6 Two songs (You my soul's most beautiful dream, you blue eyes, good night). Leipzig, Hofmeister
- Op. 7 The Bell of Innisfare. A Christmas saga in three voices connected by declamation. Youth Choirs with S.-Solo and Pfte. Offenbach, Andre
- Op. 10 A May Celebration. Ten pieces for little pianists. (The march to the forest, Mailied, The kukuk in the forest, A little dance, The mill at the edge of the forest, Catch me, The race, The boat trip, The happy homecoming, Good night)
- Op. 11 children's ball. 5 easy dance pieces for beginners in playing the piano. (polonaise, polka-mazurka, polka, waltz, gallop)
- Op. 14 Scene de Bal. Polka brilliant p. Piano. Breslau, Hainauer
- Op. 15 Danse serpentine. Valse brilliant p. Piano. Breslau, Hainauer
- Op. 16 ice flowers. Five easy dance pieces for little pianists. (Christkindl march, Bébé's dance lesson, at the costume party, the dancing snowflakes, a fun sleigh ride) Leipzig, Siegel
- Op. 16 no. 1st Christkindl March f. Pfte. Leipzig, seal
- Op. 18 snowflakes. Three easy dances for young people for four hands. (The Ball Queen, Ball Whisperer, The Brittle One). Leipzig, seal
- Op. 19 A dance album for little people. 6 easy pieces for Pfte. (The little Viennese, chatterbox, Valeska, gnomes, a sleigh party, children's party). Mainz, Scotland
- Op. 20 Colorful. Ten Easy Piano Pieces (March of the Little Soldiers, Girl's Lament, The Merry Trumpeter, Gnome Dance, Bébé's Lullaby, The Little Tambour, The Aquarius and the Mermaid, Dragonflies, Mama's Birthday, Springinsfeld). Breslau, Hainauer, 1899.
- Op. 21 A little party. 6 easy dance pieces for Pfte. (The opening, carnival lust, Mamsel Uebermut, the romper, defiant head, Kehraus). Leipzig, seal * Op. 22 Pierrot & Harlequin. Quadrille f. paw to 4 hands for two small players of the same level. Leipzig, seal
- Op. 24 Les deux dominoes. 2 Valses modern p. Piano. (Domino rouge, domino noir). Breslau, Hainauer * Op. 25 Four Brilliant Salon Dances for Pfte. (The Serpentine Dancer, The Blonde, Olga, Bridal Gavotte). Leipzig, seal
- Op. 26 Two Brilliant Piano Pieces. (The sound of waves, The Moonlit Night). Leipzig, seal
- Op. 27 Four dance tunes f. Pfte to 4 hands. (Jubilee polonaise, Viennese, glockenspiel, Hungarian). Leipzig, seal
- Op. 28 Two small pieces f. Pfte. (elegy, confession). Leipzig, seal
- Op. 29 In the elf grove. Gavotte in an easy way f. Pfte. Leipzig, Rózsavölgyi & Co
- Op. 30 Two Dances for Youth for Pfte. (polonaise, waltz). Leipzig, seal * Op. 31 Three easy salon pieces for Pfte. (Dream image, Alpine idyll, twilight hour). Breslau, Hainauer
- Op. 32 festive polonaise f. paw to 4 hands. Leipzig, seal
- Op. 33 Fantaisie mignonne hongroise pour Piano à 2 mains. Budapest &pz., Rozsavolgyi
- Op. 35 Deux Sonatines * Op. 40 In a silent night
- Op. 42 La Fileuse
- Op. 43 Twelve melodic octave studies, op. 43. Theodore Presser
- Op. 44 Mazurka, no. 2 from "Trois bagatelles,". Edward Schuberth, 1905
- Op. 46 no. 1. Spring dance. No. 2. Polka Francaise. No. 3. The little mask. No. 4. Dancing Gnomes. No. 5. The Danube Mermaid. No. 6. The funny ones * Op. 47 Morceau de Salon. (La Danse de Colombine, Cher's Souvenirs, Marquita)
- Op. 48 3 Morceaux Pour Piano a 4 Mains * Op. 53 20 small easy melodious recital pieces book 1-10
- Op. 56 Souvenir de Lemberg, 1912
- Op. 63 Danses Nationales pour Piano (Danse italienne, Scene hongroise, Valse espagnole, The same, Danse orientale, Moorish dance, Norvegian danse)
- Op. 67 Eight melodious Studies, Presser * Op. 68 Petite Suite Hongroise (Allegro agitato, Andante doloroso, Allegro con fuoco)
- Op. 69 Puppet Quadrille * Op. 73 No 1 Le Retour No 2 Au bal masque, 1905
- Op. 94 The Acrobat
- Op. 95 Dance bohemian
- Op. 103 Columbines
- Op. 103 No 1. Moonlight idyll
- Op. 108 Sonatina
- Op. 109 Trois Morceaux de Salon (Valse Brillante, Menuet Galant, Intermezzo)
- Op. 116 Seven Little Piano Pieces for Beginners. Vienna, Karl Mück
- Op. 117 Morceaux Characteristics en Forme des Etudes en Oktaves. Character pieces in the form of octave etudes. (Piano) - Leipzig: Bosworth & Co. 1914
- Op. 146 Cradle song * Blonde sweetheart. Valse elegant. (Piano) - Berlin, Leipzig, Vienna: W. Vobach & Co. 1908/09
- Twilight Dreams - 1. The young Scout 2. Twilight Dreams
- Melody pearls. Perles de melodies. Pearls of melodies. 100 folksy tunes and piano pieces for the first beginning (appendix to every piano method), arranged by Géza Horváth. - Vienna, Leipzig: Universal Edition 1920
  - Issue 1, Nos. 1-25. - U.E.6301. 13 p.
  - Issue 2, #26-50. - U.E.6302. 15 p. ** Issue 3, Nos. 51–75. - U.E.6303. 17 p.
  - Issue 4. No. 76-100. - U.E.6304. 18 pp. MS21515-4°. Mus East National Library
- Collection of popular rondos for piano 2 hands edited by Geza Horváth. - Vienna, Leipzig: Universal Edition o. J. U.E.2811. 56 S. MS7476-4°.Mus East. National Library
