= Ernst Ottensamer =

Austrian clarinetist (1955–2017)

- Born: October 5, 1955; Wallern an der Trattnach, Upper Austria
- Died: July 22, 2017 (aged 61)
- Genres: Classical
- Occupation: Principal clarinet of Vienna Philharmonic Orchestra (1983-2017)
- Instrument: Clarinet
- Formerly of: The Clarinotts

Ernst Ottensamer (5 October 1955 – 22 July 2017) was an Austrian classical clarinetist.

== Early life ==
Born in Wallern an der Trattnach in Upper Austria, Ottensamer's father, also named Ernst Ottensamer, was a former mayor of Wallern. Ottensamer studied the clarinet at the Bruckner-Konservatorium in Linz. He continued his studies in Vienna at the University of Music and Performing Arts Vienna (Universität für Musik und Darstellende Kunst in Wien), where he completed his studies in 1979. His teachers included Peter Schmidl.

== Career ==
Ottensamer joined the orchestra of the Vienna State Opera in 1979. He became principal clarinetist of the Vienna Philharmonic Orchestra in 1983. He joined the faculty of the Universität für Musik und Darstellende Kunst in Wien in 1986, and subsequently attained the title of Universitätsprofessor (University Professor) in 2000. He was a founder-member of such chamber ensembles as the Wiener Bläserensemble (Vienna Wind Ensemble), Wiener Virtuosen, and the Wiener Solisten Trio. His elder son Daniel Ottensamer (born 26 July 1986) became co-principal clarinetist with the Vienna Philharmonic alongside his father, and his younger son Andreas Ottensamer (born in 1989) is principal clarinetist of the Berlin Philharmonic. The three of them formed a clarinet ensemble, the Clarinotts. The Clarinotts' first album appeared in 2009, and their second album in 2016. Ivan Eröd composed a triple clarinet concerto for The Clarinotts, who premiered the work with the Vienna Philharmonic in January 2016.

Ottensamer died after a heart attack on 22 July 2017. His widow Cecilia and his sons survive him.

== Sources ==
Liner notes to Carl Maria von Weber, Clarinet Concertos No.1 in F Minor and No.2 in E Flat Major, Concertino for Clarinet and Orchestra in E Flat Major. Johan Wildner cond. Czecho-Slovak State Philharmonic. Naxos 8.550378
