= Urania, Vienna =

Urania
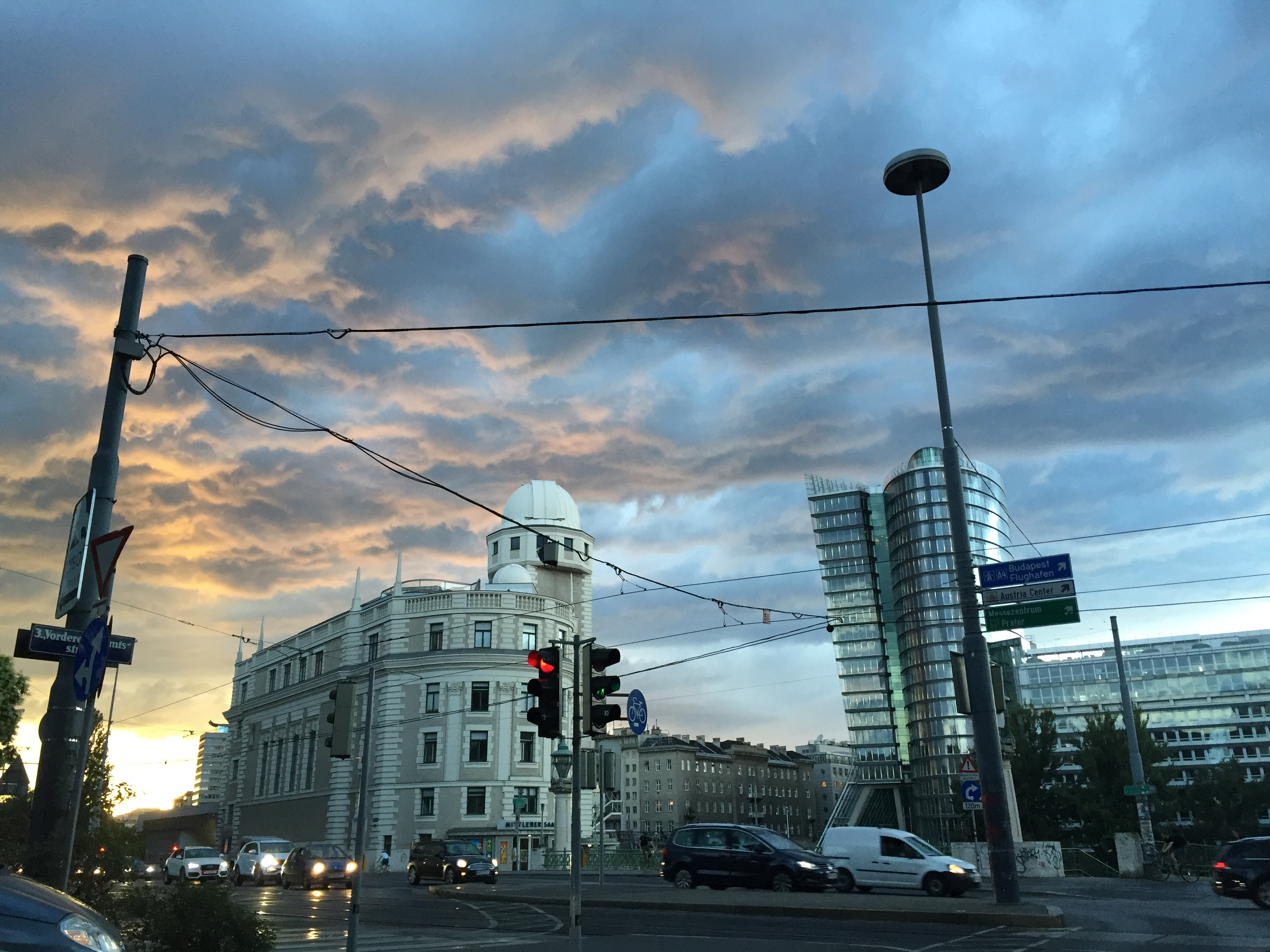
- Urania at sunset
- Named after: Urania
- Location: Vienna, Austria
- Coordinates: 48°12′42″N 16°23′01″E
- Established: 1910
- Website: www.urania-sternwarte.at
- Related media on Commons

Urania is a public educational institute and observatory in Vienna, Austria.

Urania Observatory (German: Urania Sternwarte) was built in 1909 according to the plans of Art Nouveau style architect Max Fabiani (a student of Otto Wagner) at the outlet of the Wien River and was opened in 1910 by Franz Joseph I of Austria as an educational facility with a public observatory. It was named after the Muse Urania who represents Astronomy.

During World War II, the Urania was severely damaged and the dome with the observatory was destroyed. After its reconstruction, it was reopened in 1957. The observatory itself has been continually improved technically over the years.

Though it now serves different functions, the Urania continues to be a public observatory. Presently the Urania also has seminar rooms in which wide-ranging classes and lectures are given, a movie theater that screens at the annual Viennale movie festival and a puppet theater created originally by actor Hans Kraus. The Urania moreover contains a memorial room for the Kindertransport organized by the Dutch resistance fighter and humanitarian Mrs Geertruida Wijsmuller-Meijer, who early December 1938 managed to rescue the first 600 Jewish children from Vienna after direct negotiations in Vienna with Adolf Eichmann. It also hosts a restaurant, and is the oldest public observatory in Austria. The highly awarded Austrian writer Carl Julius Haidvogel once worked there as an editor.

== Gallery ==
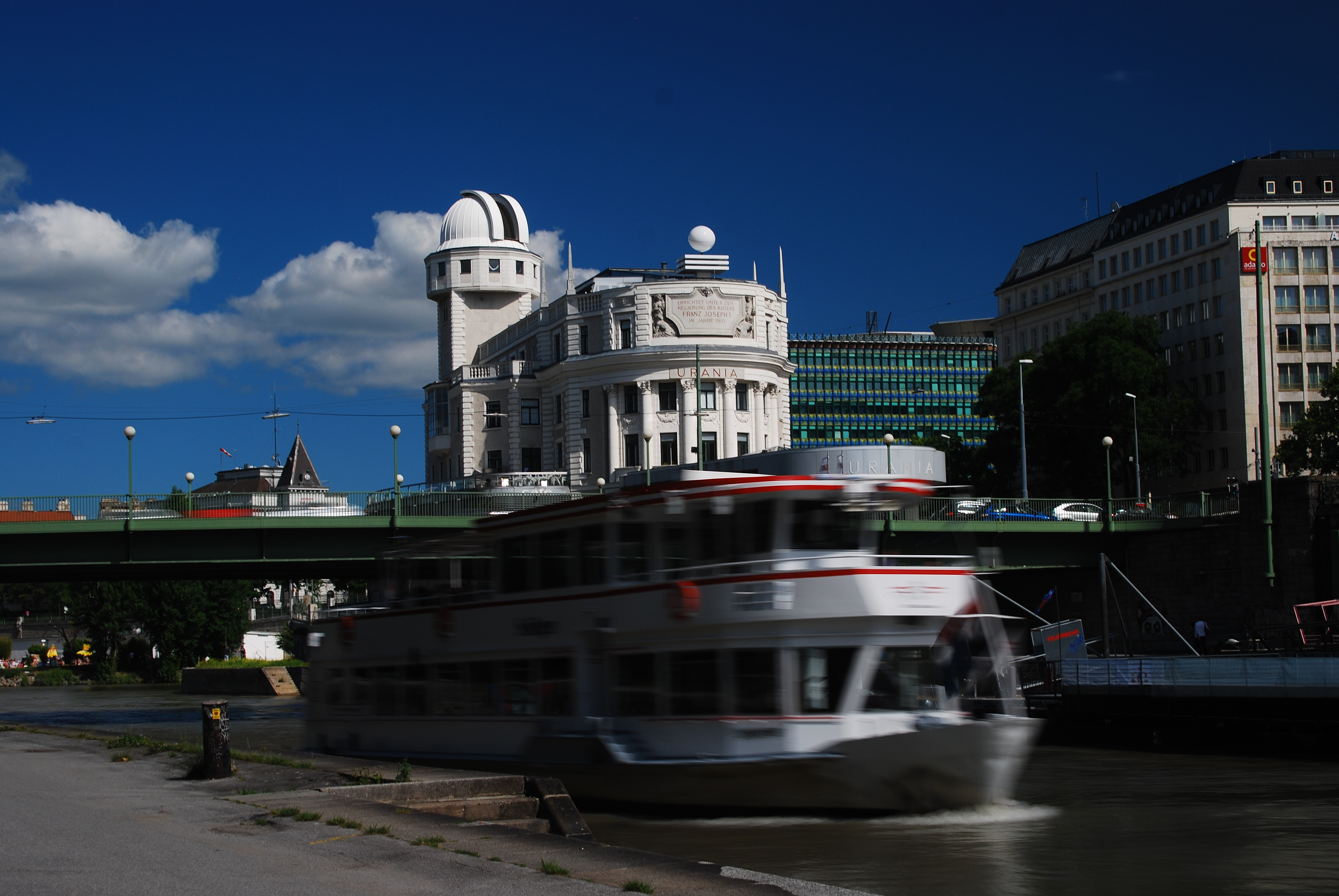

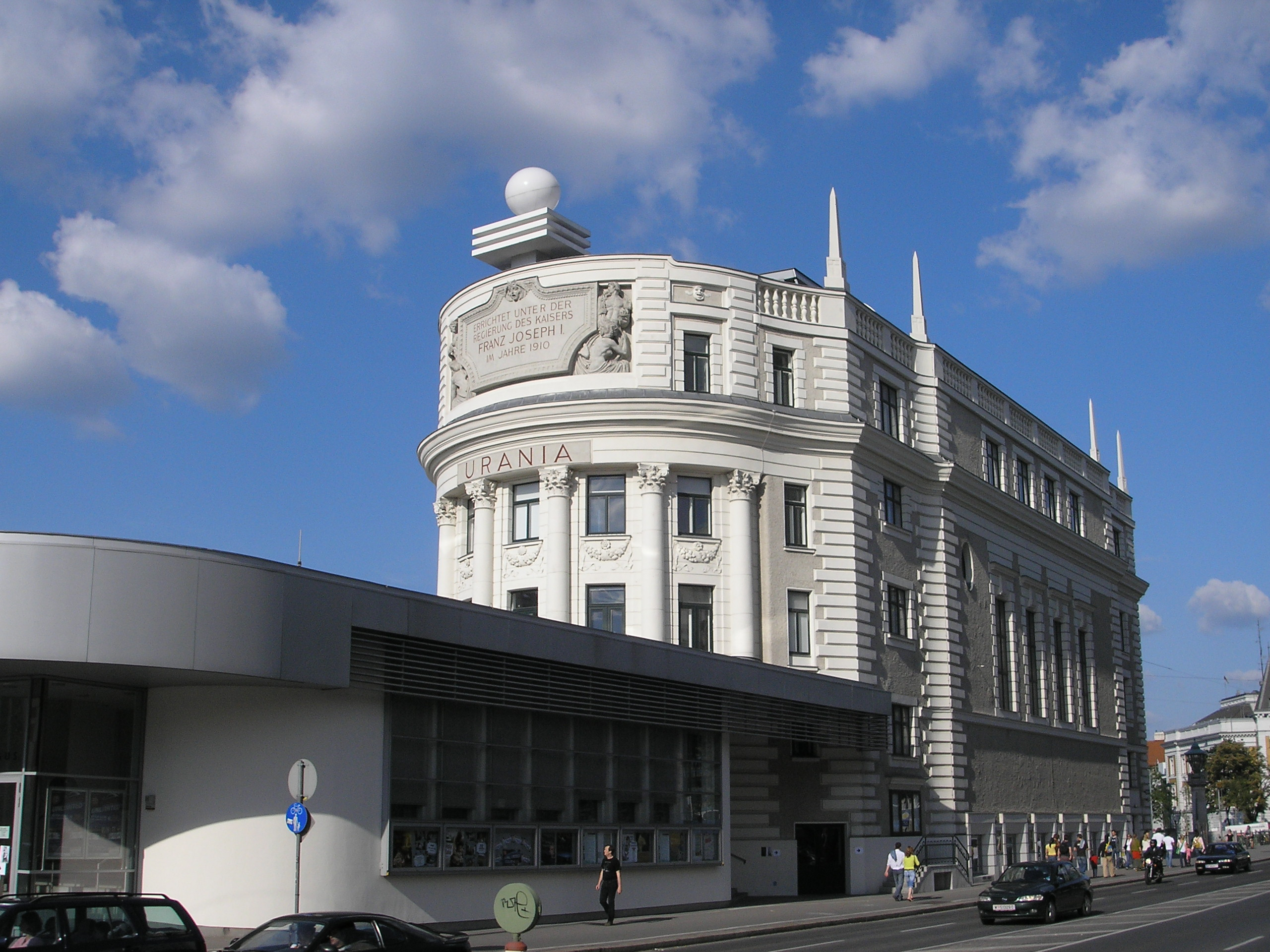

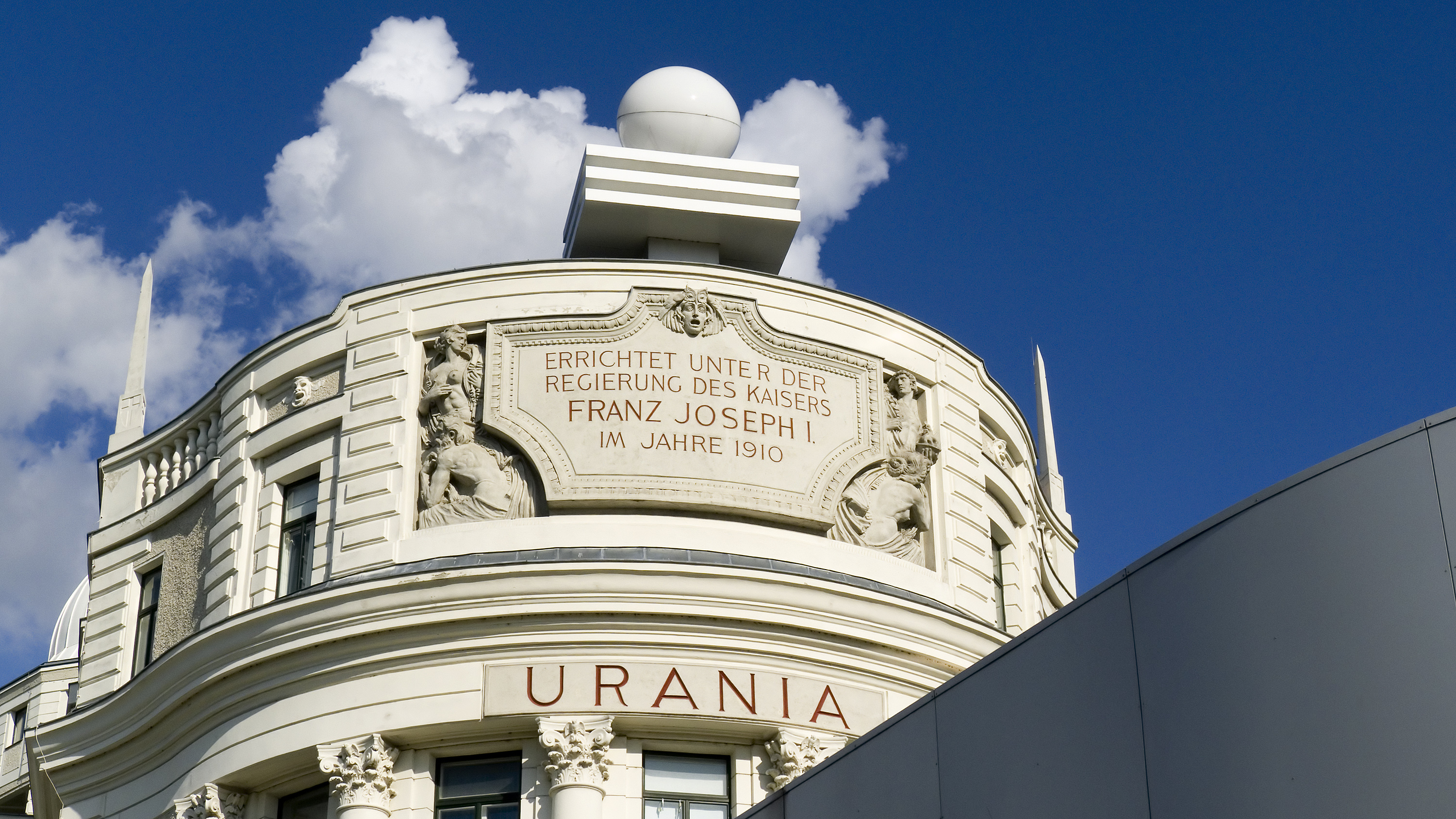

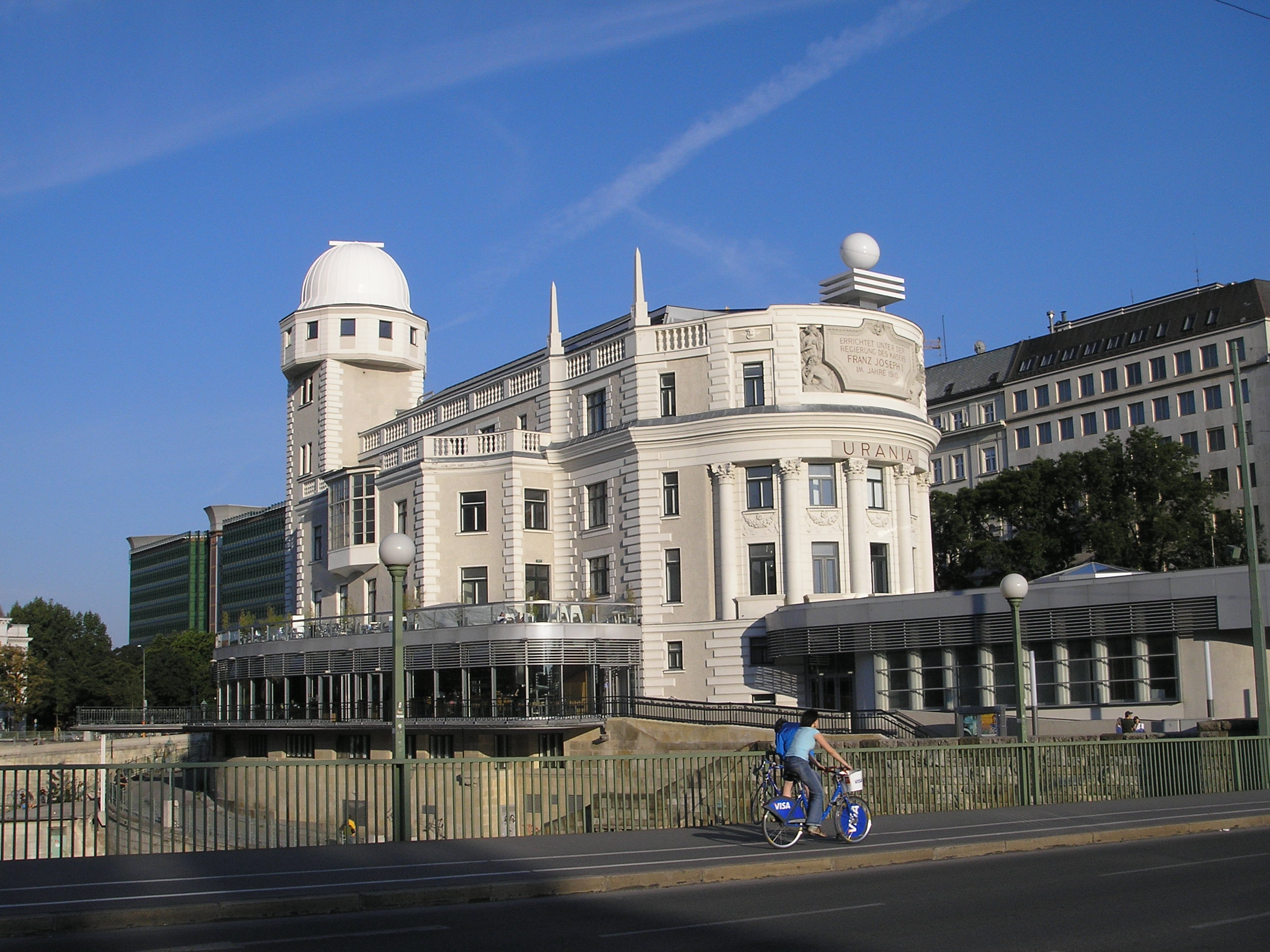

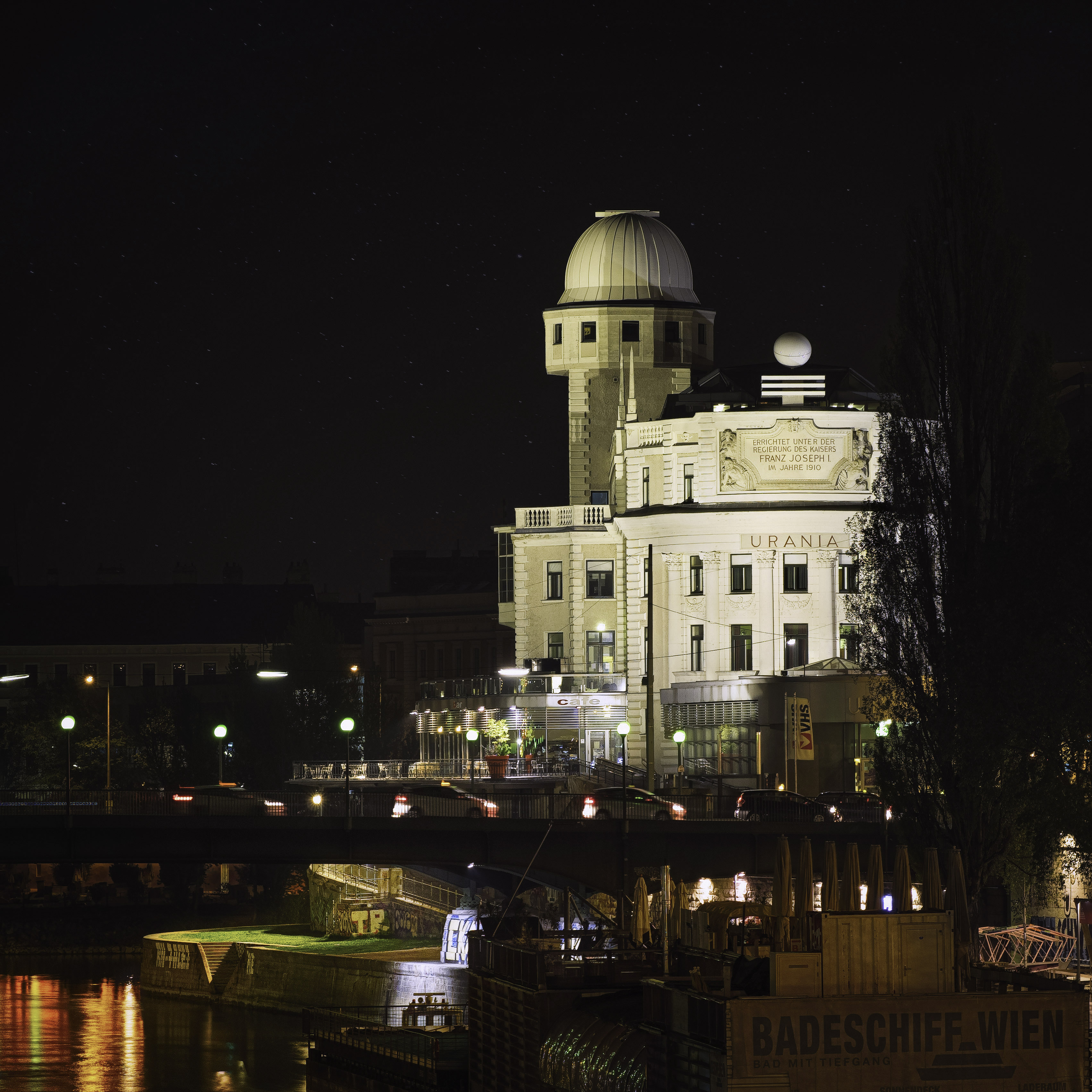

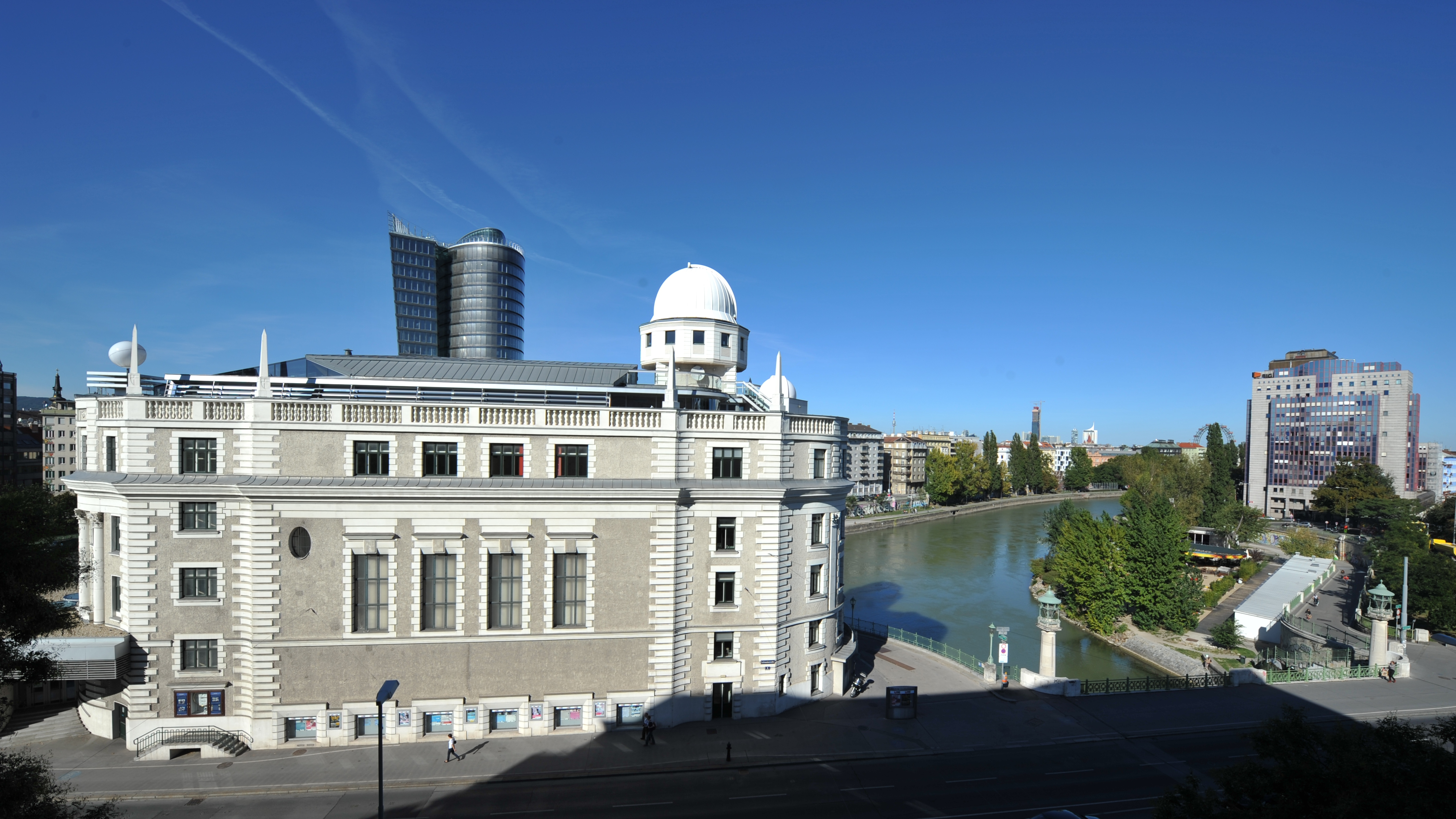

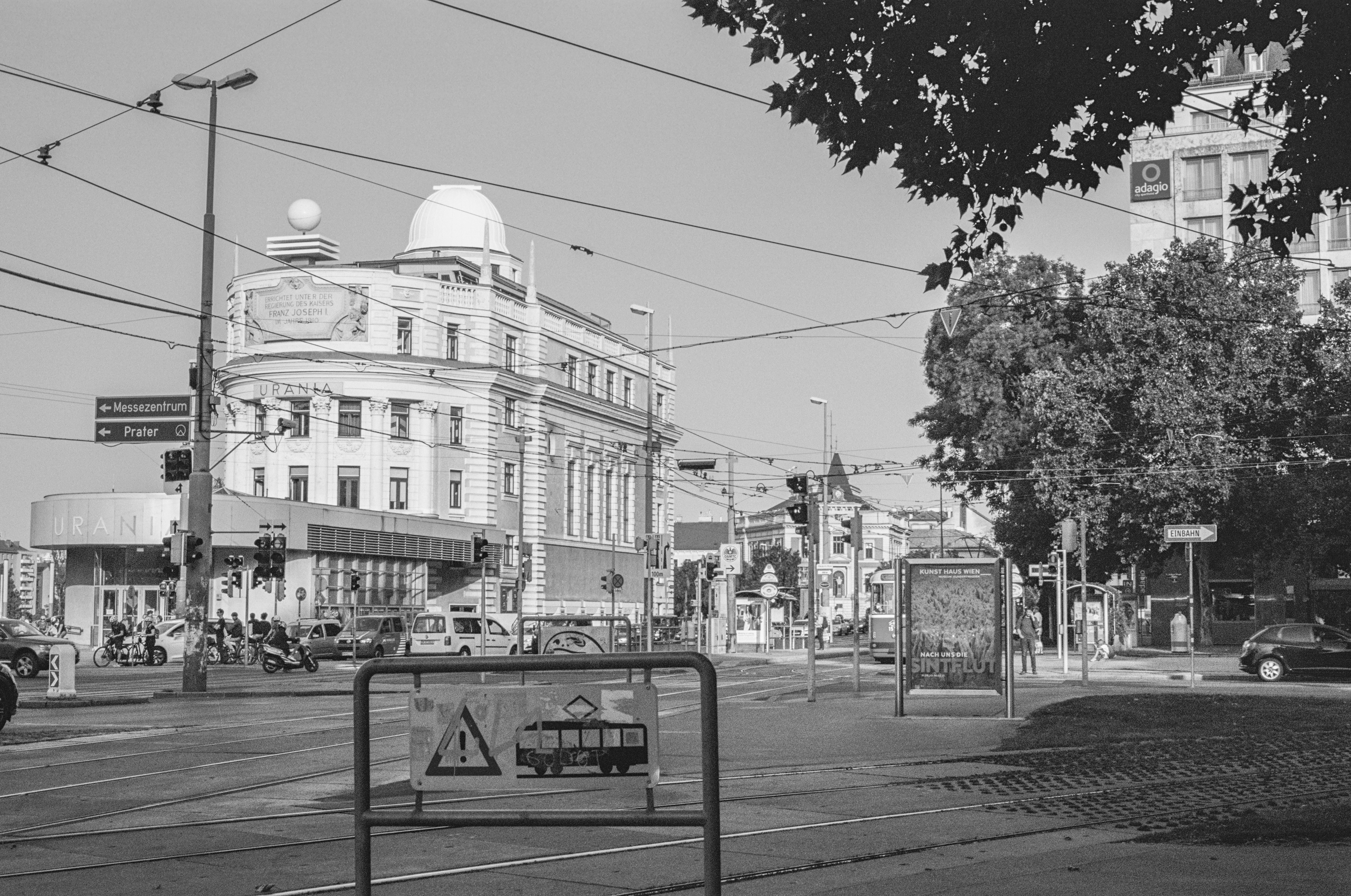
