= Johann Hindler =

Austrian musician

Johann "Hans" Hindler is an Austrian clarinetist.

Hindler teaches clarinet at the University of Music and Performing Arts in Vienna. He also plays clarinet in the Vienna Philharmonic. Austrian president Thomas Klestil awarded him the Silver Medal of Merit for service to the Republic of Austria in 2004.
