= Der Weibsteufel =

Der Weibsteufel may refer to:

- A Devil of a Woman or Der Weibsteufel, a 1951 Austrian film
- Der Weibsteufel (1966 film), an Austrian film
