= Ingeborg Bachmann – Journey into the Desert =

2023 film by Margarethe von Trotta

- Official poster
- Directed by: Margarethe von Trotta
- Screenplay by: Margarethe von Trotta
- Produced by: Katrin Renz; Alexander Dumreicher-Ivanceanu; Bady Minck; Bettina Brokemper
- Starring: Vicky Krieps; Ronald Zehrfeld; Tobias Resch; Basil Eidenbenz
- Cinematography: Martin Gschlacht
- Edited by: Hansjörg Weissbrich
- Music by: Andre Mergenthaler
- Production companies: Tellfilm GmbH; Amour Fou Film Production GmbH; Heimatfilm GmbH + Co KG; Amour Fou Luxembourg
- Distributed by: Alamode Film Distribution; The Match Factory
- Release dates: 19 February 2023 (Berlinale); 13 October 2023 (Austria)
- Running time: 110 minutes
- Countries: Switzerland; Austria; Germany; Luxembourg
- Language: German
- Budget: €8 million

Ingeborg Bachmann – Journey into the Desert is a 2023 European co-production biopic-drama film directed by Margarethe von Trotta and stars Vicky Krieps in the titular role. The film depicts the life of Austrian poet and author Ingeborg Bachmann (1926–1973).

It was selected to compete for the Golden Bear at the 73rd Berlin International Film Festival, where it had its world premiere on 19 February 2023.

== Synopsis ==
The biopic film is about the life of the Austrian poet and author Ingeborg Bachmann, who lived in Berlin, Zürich, and Rome. The film depicts her relationship with Swiss playwright Max Frisch, her friendship with composer Hans Werner Henze, and her trip to Egypt with writer Adolf Opel. It also showcases her radical texts and readings.

== Cast ==
- Vicky Krieps as Ingeborg Bachmann
- Ronald Zehrfeld as Max Frisch
- Tobias Resch as Adolf Opel
- Basil Eidenbenz as Hans Werner Henze
- Marc Limpach as Tankred Dorst
- Luna Wedler as Marlene
- Renato Carpentieri as Giuseppe Ungaretti
- Ricardo Angelini as Kellner Café Greco Rom
- Bettina Scheuritzel as Zuschauerin leseabend

== Production ==
The film was shot from 28 March to 6 June 2022 in the cities of Vienna, Rome, Zürich, Luxembourg, Cologne, Bonn, while the desert scenes were shot in Jordan.

== Release ==
Ingeborg Bachmann – Journey into the Desert had its premiere on 19 February 2023 as part of the 73rd Berlin International Film Festival, in competition. It played at the German Film Festival in multiple cinemas across Australia between 2 and 24 May 2023. The film was selected in 'Cinema International' section at the 29th Kolkata International Film Festival and was screened on 9 December 2023.

It was released in Austrian cinemas on 13 October 2023.

== Reception ==
On the review aggregator Rotten Tomatoes website, the film has an approval rating of 80% based on 10 reviews, with an average rating of 6.3/10. On Metacritic, it has a weighted average score of 55 out of 100 based on 5 reviews, indicating "Mixed or average reviews".

Lee Marshall for ScreenDaily wrote in review that "A touching tribute to a woman who, von Trotta suggests, pitted a radical desire to question everything against the comfortable certainties of the men who surrounded her." Marco Vito Oddo graded the film B+ and wrote for Collider, "When so many biopics end in disasters, it is definitely worth praising a refreshing take on the genre, especially when it focuses on a woman who’s equally complicated and fascinating". Ben Rolph graded the film "A" and wrote for AwardsWatch, "Margarethe von Trotta’s latest film is a graceful triumph of modern European cinema".

Davide Abbatescianni, of Cineuropa heavily criticised the film, labelling it as "a rather outdated upper-class drama," which includes some "unintentionally funny" moments. While acknowledging that the director "steers clear of judging the real-life figures and their troubled existences," the way these are portrayed "makes them look like they belong to the endless series of bourgeois characters that have been filling our screens for decades". Similarly to Abbatescianni, Variety's Jessica Kiang wrote how Vicky Krieps couldn't "save an oldfangled biopic," describing the picture as "a mawkish melodrama more interested in poet and author Bachmann's romantic life than her work".

== Accolades ==
Award	Date	Category	Recipient	Result	Ref.
Berlin International Film Festival	26 February 2023	Golden Bear	Ingeborg Bachmann – Journey into the Desert	Nominated	
