= Christiane Schmidtmer =

German actress and model

- Born: 24 December 1939; Mannheim, Germany
- Died: 13 March 2003 (aged 63); Heidelberg, Germany
- Occupation: Actress
- Years active: 1963–1981
- Spouse: Michel Thomas

Christiane Schmidtmer (24 December 1939 – 13 March 2003) was a German actress, fashion model, nude model, and memoirist.

== Biography ==
=== Early life ===
Christiane Schmidtmer was born in Mannheim, Germany, to Gertrud and Jakob Schmidtmer on Christmas Eve 1939. She took acting lessons in Munich and worked in the stage in Germany for around 4 years (1961-1963), then Christiane turned to photographic modeling for several German glammor model magazines, and later, Playboy. Before acting in film, she also modeled for advertising companies, such as Max Factor cosmetics. Her father disappeared in Russia during the war. The family later relocated from Mannheim to nearby Heidelberg after her mother remarried.

At the age of 17, her mother sent her to London, where Christiane attended St Giles School to learn English. After her stay, she returned to Heidelberg and attended the local Hölderlin-Gymnasium (academic high school) from which she graduated during the late 1950s.

In 1959 against strong family opposition – her mother wanted her to follow a career in medicine – Christiane Schmidtmer moved to Munich, where she began taking acting lessons. During that time, she performed in afternoon stage productions for children.

=== Career ===
Schmidtmer worked onstage in Germany from 1961–63, then turned to photographic modelling for German fashion and nude magazines and later, Playboy in the USA. She modelled for advertising companies, namely Max Factor Cosmetics, before she started her movie career. She was hired as their featured model and introduced at the New York World's Fair in 1964 followed by an American tour with visits to Los Angeles, Las Vegas, and Chicago. After her return to Los Angeles, she met polyglot language teacher and publisher Michel Thomas for the first time in August 1965 at Chateau Marmont. The two began a long love relationship a short time later.

She appeared in German TV and movie productions, such as Rolf Hädrich's Stop Train 349. During the filming in Berlin and England, she befriended co-star José Ferrer. The friendship lasted until Ferrer's death in 1992. He later recommended her to Stanley Kramer for his production of Ship of Fools, her first US film in which she played Ferrer's beautiful German mistress and Nazi party member. Also in 1965 she played Lufthansa stewardess Lise Bruner in Boeing Boeing (1965).

Schmidtmer was one of just a few German actresses successful in 1960s Hollywood, and was praised by critics as the most exciting German import since Marlene Dietrich. Schmidtmer, with her attractive and typically German appearance, was often reduced to playing the sexualized "attractive German". Her nickname which stuck throughout her career was "Liebesbombe"/"Love Bomb". A 1965 article in The New York Times described her as a "chesty wonder".

Throughout the 1970s and towards the end of her career, Schmidtmer appeared in numerous US talk shows, television series and B-movie productions such as The Giant Spider Invasion (1975). She played a sadistic white prison wardress who is raped in an act of revenge in the 70s "shock movie" The Big Doll House (1971). In 1981, she appeared in Hot Bubblegum – one of the sequels in the Israeli Eskimo Limon series. Most sources list this as her last film; in it she portrayed a nymphomaniac piano teacher.

Schmidtmer continued to do commercials and voiceover work in a number of productions.

=== Later years and death ===
Following her movie career, Schmidtmer worked as a licensed real estate agent in Southern California. She lived both in the US and Heidelberg. In 1980, shortly before ending her movie career, she published her autobiography My Wild Nights in Hollywood in German magazines, which detailed her claimed affairs with many actors, including a relationship with Glenn Ford. It was later translated into several languages. During that time, she lived in Munich-Schwabing.

In 1995, Schmidtmer permanently moved back to Germany. She led a quiet life, but her health started to fail. Schmidtmer died in her sleep on 13 March 2003 at her home in Heidelberg, Germany, from natural causes following an accident. Schmidtmer is interred at the family grave in Heidelberg-Handschuhsheim.

== Filmography ==
- Geld sofort (1961, TV Short) as die Sekretärin
- Ein Todesfall wird vorbereitet (1963, TV movie) as Sandra Williams
- Stop Train 349 (1963) as Karin
- Hafenpolizei (1963, TV Series) as Hannelore
- Fanny Hill (1964) as Fiona
- Sechs Stunden Angst (1964, TV movie) as Carla de la Osta
- DM-Killer (1965) as Miranda (uncredited)
- Ship of Fools (1965) as Lizzi
- Boeing Boeing (1965) as Lise Bruner / Lufthansa
- Blue Light (1966, TV series) as Erika von Lindendorf
- The Wild Wild West (1966, TV Series) as Lucretia Ivronin
- 12 O'Clock High (1966, TV series) as Frieda von Heurtzel
- I Deal in Danger (1966) as Erika von Lindendorf
- Hogan's Heroes (1968, TV series) as Heidi Baum
- Our Doctor is the Best (1969) as Frau Janssen
- The Most Deadly Game (1970, TV Series) as Bettina
- The Big Doll House (1971) as Miss Dietrich
- Scream, Pretty Peggy (1973, TV movie) as Jennifer Elliot
- Police Story (1974-1976, TV series) as Lynn / Hilda
- Airport 1975 (1974) as Angie Bell - Passenger (uncredited)
- The Specialist (1975) as Nude Model
- Half a House (1975) as Gina
- The Giant Spider Invasion (1975) as Helga (wrongly credited as Christiana Schmidtmer)
- Wonder Woman (1977, TV Series) as Lisa Engel
- Star Struck (1978, short) as Kimberly Shaw
- Half a House (1979) as Gina
- Hot Bubblegum (1981) as Fritzi (final film role)

== Sources ==
- Biodata, lifeinlegacy.com
