= Vicky Krieps =

Luxembourgish and German actress (born 1983)

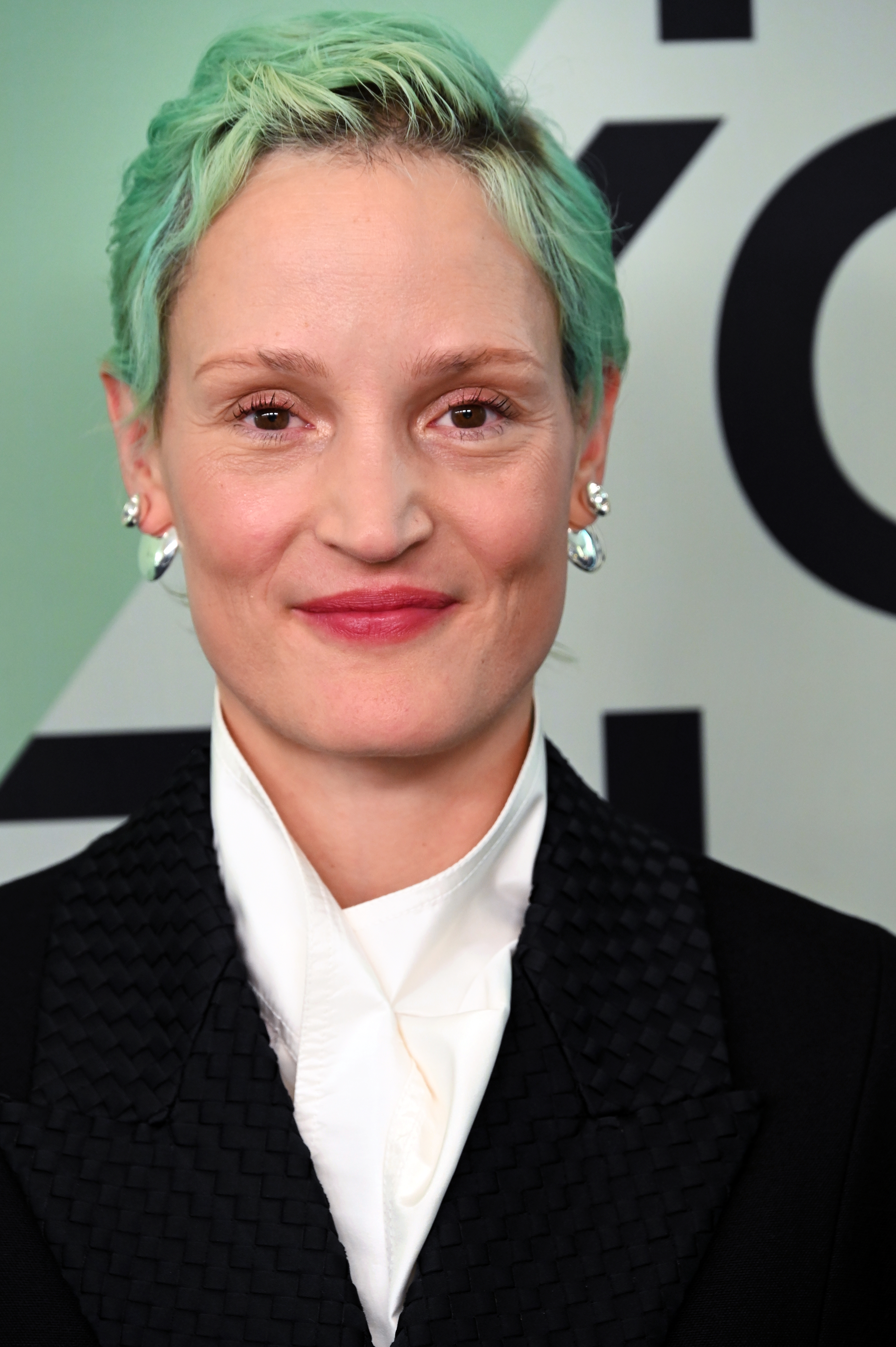
- Krieps in 2025
- Born: 4 October 1983 (age 43); Hesperange, Luxembourg
- Citizenship: Luxembourg; Germany
- Occupation: Actress
- Years active: 2008–present
- Spouse: Lazaros Gounaridis (m. 2025)
- Children: 2

Vicky Krieps (born 4 October 1983) is a Luxembourgish-German actress. She has appeared in a number of Luxembourgish, German, American, and French productions. Her early films include Hanna (2011), Anonymous (2011), Two Lives (2012), and A Most Wanted Man (2014). Her breakout role was in the London-based period film Phantom Thread (2017). Directed by Paul Thomas Anderson, the film received much critical acclaim, particularly for her performance.

After the success of Phantom Thread, Krieps next starred in The Girl in the Spider's Web (2018), The Last Vermeer (2019), Old (2021), and The Survivor (2021). She earned acclaim for her performances in Bergman Island (2021), Hold Me Tight (2021), and Corsage (2022). Her portrayal of Empress Elisabeth of Austria in Corsage earned her the European Film Award for Best Actress.

== Early life and education ==
Krieps was born on 4 October 1983 in Hesperange, Luxembourg, the daughter of a Luxembourgish father, who managed a film distribution company, and a German mother. Her father, Bob Krieps, is the director general of the Ministry of Culture of Luxembourg, the former director of Sacem Luxembourg, and the former president of the Luxembourg Film Fund. Several of her films have been funded by the Luxembourg Film Fund, which is supervised by the Ministry of Culture, which then decides which films will be funded by state subsidies. Her paternal grandfather, Robert Krieps, was a politician, war-time member of the Luxembourg Resistance, and Luxembourg's Minister of Justice, National Education and Culture in the 1970s and 1980s.

Krieps had her first acting experiences at the Lycée de Garçons secondary school in Luxembourg City, receiving training at the Conservatoire de Luxembourg. Rather than enrolling in one of the drama schools, she participated in a social project at the primary school of a South African township near Knysna. This confirmed her resolve to study acting, with the goal of performing on theatre stages.

Krieps attended Zurich University of the Arts, while gathering acting experience at Schauspielhaus Zürich.

== Career ==
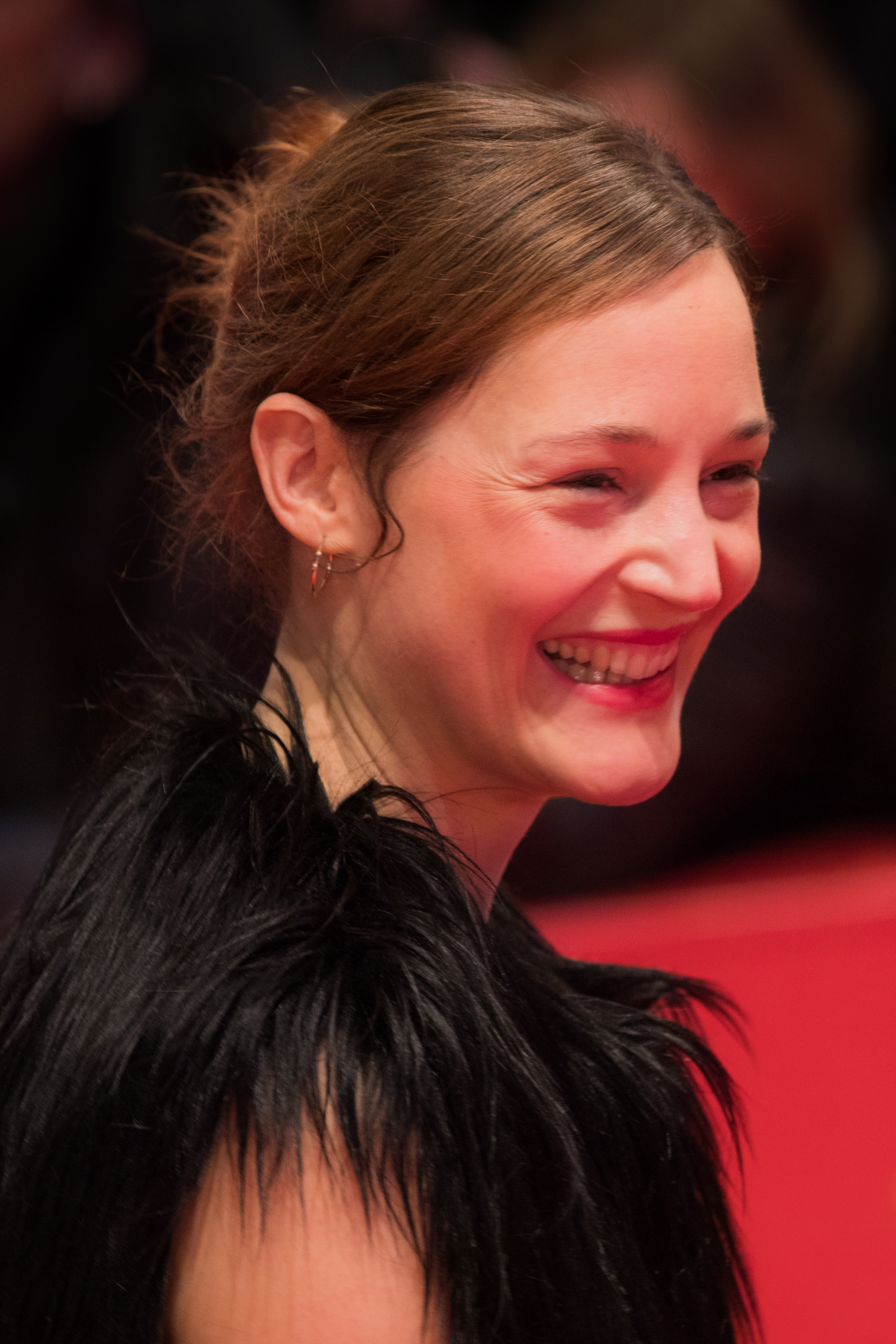
Krieps at the Berlinale 2018

Krieps had numerous roles in Luxembourgish films and television series, before starring in foreign productions, such as Hanna (2011), Rommel (2012), Before the Winter Chill (2013) and Elly Beinhorn: Solo Flight, a biopic about the German aviation pioneer Elly Beinhorn. She also had supporting roles in Anonymous (2011) and A Most Wanted Man (2014).

Krieps had her career breakthrough, starring opposite Daniel Day-Lewis in the period film Phantom Thread (2017). Directed by Paul Thomas Anderson, the film revolves around the romantic relationship between an older man, a fashion designer, and a younger woman. Receiving critical acclaim for her role, Dan Jolin of Empire stated that Krieps "can hold her own opposite a titan like Day-Lewis", while David Edelstein of Vulture wrote that she is "bewitchingly lucent, her face just masklike enough to make our sudden awareness of all her dark thoughts a shock." The film received six Academy Award nominations, including for Best Picture.

Krieps played the magazine publisher in The Girl in the Spider's Web (2018) and Minna Holberg in the drama film The Last Vermeer (2019). She portrayed the morally compromised Alsatian interpreter in the 2018 television series Das Boot, and subsequently in the second series. In 2021, Krieps starred in M. Night Shyamalan's horror film Old and in the drama film Bergman Island. That same year, she starred in the HBO film The Survivor, the Netflix film Beckett, and Mathieu Amalric's drama film Hold Me Tight, which premiered at the 2021 Cannes Film Festival. Susannah Gruder of IndieWire praised her performance writing, "Krieps, who delivers a disarmingly vulnerable, yet understated performance that keeps the film grounded. Her wispy elegance is tempered by a clumsy charm as she lovingly strokes her daughter’s hair, or floats through the world in her newly-solo life".

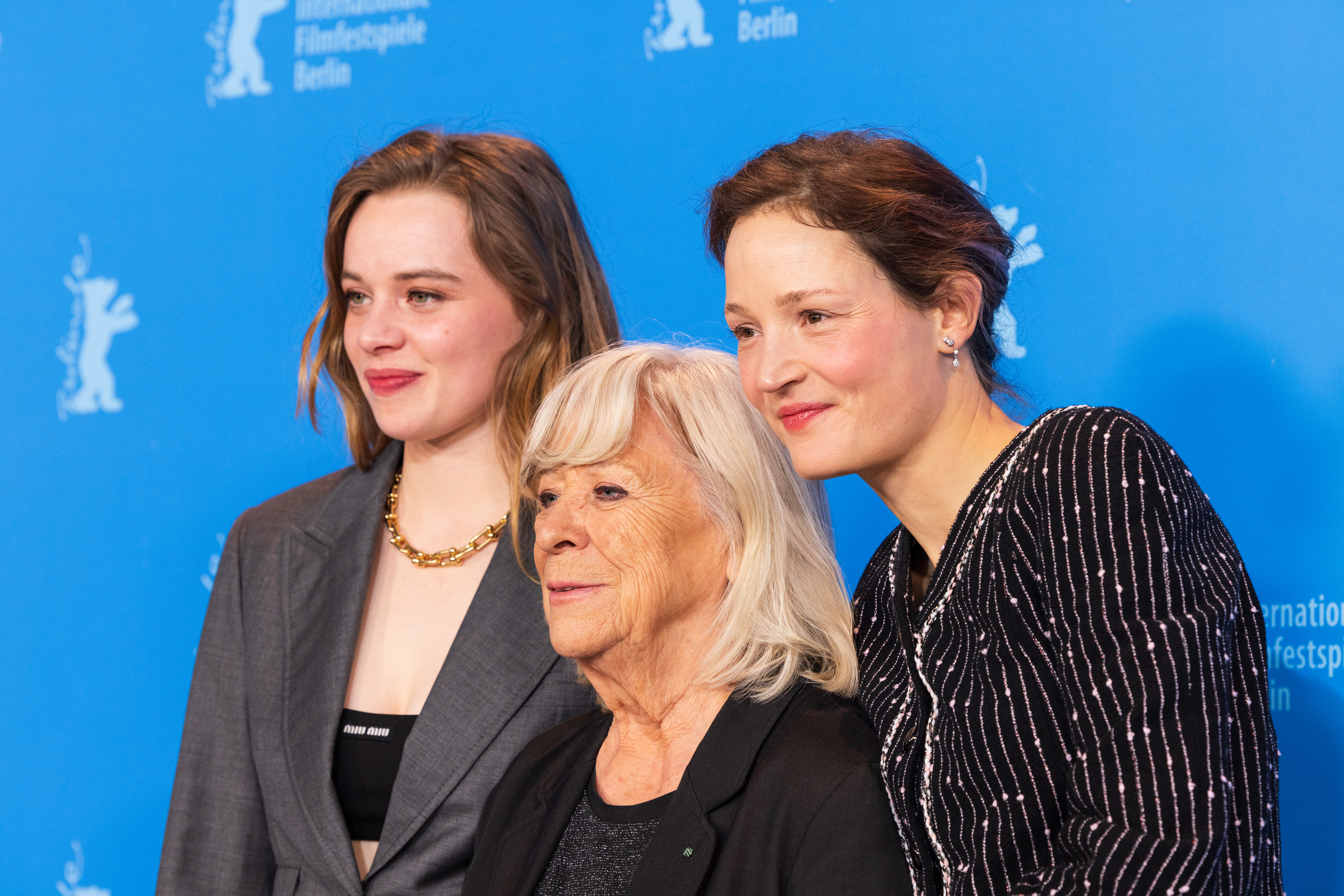
Luna Wedler, Margarethe von Trotta and Krieps at the Berlinale 2023

The following year, Krieps portrayed Empress Elisabeth of Austria in the historical drama Corsage, which she also served as an executive producer. The film premiered at the 2022 Cannes Film Festival in the Un Certain Regard section, and she won the Best Performance Prize in that section. Jessica Kiang of Variety praised the casting describing it as "the best showcase for [Krieps]' defiantly peculiar charisma since Phantom Thread. For her performance, she received the European Film Award for Best Actress. She continued to act in the acclaimed drama films More Than Ever (2022) and Ingeborg Bachmann – Journey into the Desert (2023).

In 2023, Krieps starred in the western drama The Dead Don't Hurt, directed by Viggo Mortensen. The film premiered at the 2023 Toronto International Film Festival. Krieps is described as being the true central figure of the revisionist Western. Frank Scheck of The Hollywood Reporter wrote, "Krieps delivers yet another astonishing turn in a career that already seems destined for greatness. Her Vivienne — warm yet steely, courageous yet vulnerable, fierce yet loving — is a complex, fascinating character who’s compelling every moment she’s onscreen." That same year, she also portrayed Anne of Austria in the two-part action adventure film The Three Musketeers: D'Artagnan and The Three Musketeers: Milady.

== Other activities ==
Since 2023, Krieps has been a member of the Academy of Motion Picture Arts and Sciences. In 2026, she served on the jury of the Marrakech International Film Festival, chaired by Marion Cotillard.

On the occasion of a partnership with eyewear brand Mykita in 2025, Rimowa released a campaign featuring Krieps and Udo Kier. Photographed by Jack Davison and choreographed by Lenio Kaklea, she was later featured in Bottega Veneta's 2025 advertising campaign celebrating the 50th anniversary of its signature Intrecciato leather.

== Personal life ==
Krieps moved to Berlin, Germany, in her early 20s. She has Luxembourgish and German nationality. As of 2023, she resided in Berlin with the two children she had with her former partner, the German actor Jonas Laux.

In May 2025, Krieps married Greek film production assistant Lazaros Gounaridis at a private ceremony in Gounaridis's hometown in Chalkidiki, Greece. They met in 2023 while working together on the set of Hot Milk (2025).

In April 2021, Krieps was part of the controversial campaign #allesdichtmachen ("Close everything down"), which featured 50 German-speaking actors making fun of Germany's protective measures against COVID-19. In her video, Krieps says, among other things, that acting helped her to deal with her fear of people. The campaign, released when Germany had more than 80,000 deaths related to COVID-19, was highly criticised as being "tasteless" and "cringe-worthy", but it also received support from members of the far-right and COVID-deniers.

When asked about the #MeToo movement in 2018, Krieps said: "Maybe it's very European, but I always see both sides. I feel very sorry for the people who have been harassed, but I also feel very sorry for the people who have lived a life where they have been harassing people." When Krieps was questioned on Instagram about the alleged abuser in the cast of her film Corsage (2022) who was kept in the film after director Marie Kreutzer was informed about him, she said: "So, a feminist film made by two women should be discarded because of the misconduct of a male colleague?... Who exactly is being harmed by this?" Krieps was also an executive producer on Corsage. The case became public in Austria in June 2022, when Austrian director Katharina Mückstein shared an Instagram story that generated a lot of media attention and sparked a new wave of the #MeToo Movement in Austria. On 13 January 2023, another one of Krieps' co-stars from Corsage, Florian Teichtmeister (who played her character's husband in the film), was charged with possession of child pornography, and later that year he pleaded guilty and was sentenced to a two-year suspended prison sentence. In an interview with Variety on 19 February 2023, Krieps talked about Teichtmeister's case for the first time, saying, "It's the problem of a man who needs probably treatment and help and also, it needs to be judged by the law. To me, I don't even see in what way this could be controversial to the movie. It was a shock to know that someone I was so close to was apparently someone I didn't know. This was more shocking, and shaking me in a way thinking about humans and society and how we think we know each other, but we don't. In that way I thought about it a lot but I never understood what it has to do with the movie. He's not playing Sisi and the movie is not about manliness. In my eyes it is not really connected."

== Filmography ==
=== Film ===
Year	Title	Role	Notes
2008	La Nuit passée	Christina	Short film
2009	X on a Map	Ana	Short film
2009	House of Boys	Flower shop girl	
2011	Legal.Illegal	Kicki	Short film
2011	If Not Us, Who?	Dörte	
2011	Hanna	Johanna Zadek	
2011	Elle ne pleure pas, elle chante	Nurse	
2011	Anonymous	Bessie Vavasour	
2012	Formentera	Mara	
2012	D'Belle Epoque	Belle	Documentary
2012	The Treasure Knights and the Secret of Melusina	Marie Kutter	
2012	Two Lives	Kathrin Lehnhaber	
2012	Measuring the World	Johanna Gauss	
2013	Tied	Angel	
2013	Möbius	Olga	
2013	Before the Winter Chill	Caroline	
2013	Brotherhood of Tears	Russian woman	
2014	A Most Wanted Man	Niki	
2014	Meer zwischen uns	Karen	Short film
2014	The Chambermaid Lynn	Lynn	
2015	M wie Martha	Helene	Short film
2015	Pitter Patter Goes My Heart	Lisa	Short film
2015	Outside the Box	Yvonne von Geseke	
2015	Colonia	Ursel	
2016	Was hat uns bloß so ruiniert	Stella	
2017	The Young Karl Marx	Jenny von Westphalen	
2017	Gutland	Lucy Loschetter	
2017	Phantom Thread	Alma Elson	
2018	3 Days in Quiberon	Hotel maid	
2018	The Girl in the Spider's Web	Erika Berger	
2019	The Last Vermeer	Minna Holberg	
2020	Faithful	Hélène Iveton	
2021	Next Door	Target	Cameo
2021	Bergman Island	Chris Sanders	
2021	Old	Prisca Cappa	
2021	Beckett	Lena	
2021	The Survivor	Miriam Wofsoniker	
2021	Hold Me Tight	Clarisse	
2022	Corsage	Empress Elisabeth of Austria	Also executive producer
2022	More Than Ever	Hélène	
2023	Ingeborg Bachmann – Journey into the Desert	Ingeborg Bachmann	
2023	The Three Musketeers: D'Artagnan	Anne of Austria	
2023	The Three Musketeers: Milady	Anne of Austria	
2023	The Dead Don't Hurt	Vivienne Le Coudy	
2024	Went Up the Hill	Jill	
2024	Two People Exchanging Saliva	Narrator	Voice; short film
2025	Hot Milk	Ingrid	
2025	Love Me Tender	Clémence	
2025	Re-creation	Juror #8	
2025	Yakushima's Illusion	Corry	
2025	Father Mother Sister Brother	Lilith	
2026	Diamond	Sharon Cobbs	
2026	The Idiot(s)	TBA	
2027	Untitled Ocean's Eleven prequel	TBA	Filming
TBA	The Joy of Sex	TBA	Filming

=== Television ===
Year	Title	Role	Notes
2011	Tatort	Mariam Sert	Episode: "Eine bessere Welt"
2012	Rommel	Comtesse de La Rochefoucauld	Television film
2014	Elly Beinhorn: Solo Flight	Elly Beinhorn	Television film
2014	The Witness House	Marie-Claude Vaillant-Couturier	Television film
2015	Tag der Wahrheit	Ursel	Television film
2015	Mon cher petit village	Elisabeth	Television film
2017	Der Kriminalist	Dr. Kim Koch	Episode: "Hochrisiko"
2018–2020	Das Boot	Simone Strasser	10 episodes
2025	Monster: The Ed Gein Story	Ilse Koch	Main role
2026	Monster: The Lizzie Borden Story	Bridget "Maggie" Sullivan / Elizabeth Báthory	Main role

== Awards and nominations ==
Year	Award	Category	Nominated work	Result	Ref.
2008	Budapest Short Film Festival	Best Youngster Award	La nuit passée	Won	
2012	Luxembourg Film Awards	Young Newcomer Award	—N/a	Won	
2016	Preis der deutschen Filmkritik	Best Actress	The Chambermaid Lynn	Nominated	
2017	Chicago Film Critics Association	Best Actress	Phantom Thread	Nominated	
2019	Deutscher Fernsehpreis	Best Actress	Das Boot	Won	
2022	César Awards	Best Actress	Hold Me Tight	Nominated	
2022	Cannes Film Festival	Un Certain Regard Best Performance Prize (shared with Adam Bessa for Harka)	Corsage	Won	
2022	European Film Awards	European Actress	Corsage	Won	
2022	London Film Critics' Circle	Actress of the Year	Corsage	Nominated	
2023	Satellite Awards	Best Actress in a Motion Picture Drama	Corsage	Nominated	
2023	Austrian Film Awards	Best Actress in a Leading Role	Corsage	Won	
2023	Toronto International Film Festival	TIFF Tribute Performer Award	—N/a	Honored	
2025	Karlovy Vary International Film Festival	Festival President's Award		Honoured	
