= Thy Name Is Woman =

1924 film

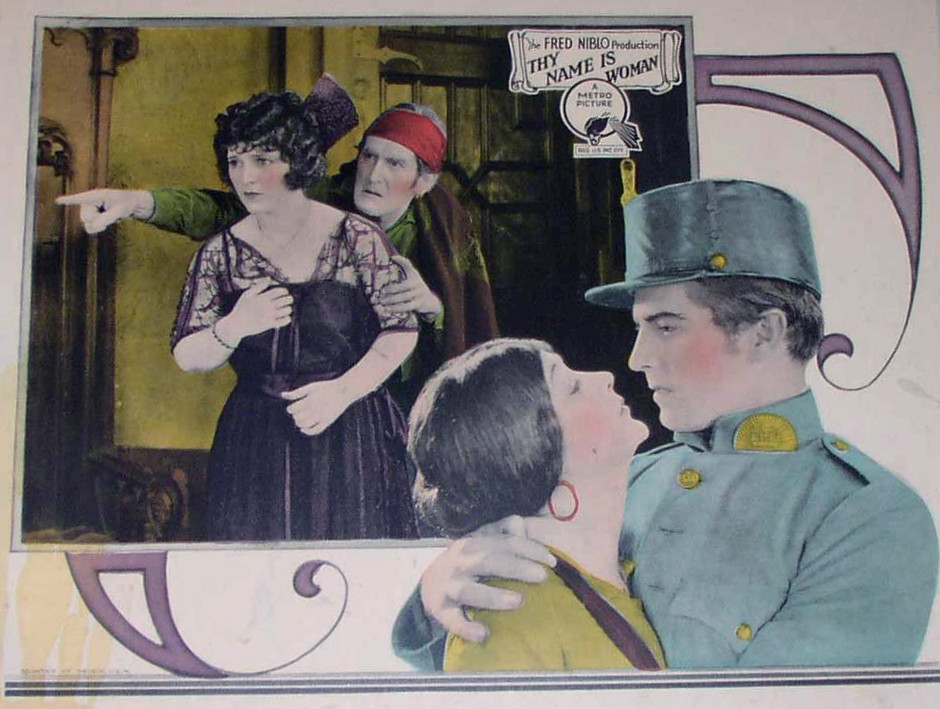
- Lobby card
- Directed by: Fred Niblo
- Written by: Bess Meredyth
- Based on: Der Weibsteufel (play) by Karl Schönherr
- Produced by: Louis B. Mayer
- Starring: Ramon Novarro; Barbara La Marr
- Cinematography: Victor Milner
- Edited by: Lloyd Nosler
- Distributed by: Metro Pictures
- Release date: February 4, 1924
- Running time: 9 reels
- Country: United States
- Language: Silent (English intertitles)
- Budget: $175,000
- Box office: $388,000 (US/Canada))

Thy Name Is Woman is a 1924 American silent drama film directed by Fred Niblo and starring Ramon Novarro and Barbara La Marr. A copy of the film survives in the Turner Archive. The film made an estimated profit of more than $100,000.

== Plot ==
As described in a film magazine review, Spanish soldier Juan Ricardo is assigned to obtain evidence against Pedro the Fox, an old smuggler. His acquaintance with Pedro's wife Guerita ripens into mutual love. When Guerita and Juan are about to depart, her elderly husband approaches under the pretense of giving her a farewell kiss, but instead stabs and kills her. Pedro then falls dead from the reactive shock of his own deed. Juan is then arrested and charged with having failed in his mission. The intercession of Dolores, the daughter of the Commandante who is in love with Juan, brings about his release.

== Cast ==
- Ramon Novarro as Juan Ricardo
- Barbara La Marr as Guerita
- William V. Mong as Pedro the Fox (Guerita's husband)
- Wallace MacDonald as Capt. Rodrigo de Castelar
- Robert Edeson as The Commandante
- Edith Roberts as Dolores (The Commandante's daughter)
- Claire McDowell as Juan's mother

== See also ==
- A Devil of a Woman (1951)
- Der Weibsteufel (1966)
