= Will Tremper =

German writer

- Born: 19 September 1928; Braubach, Germany
- Died: 14 December 1998 (aged 70); Munich, Germany
- Occupations: Screenwriter; Film director Film producer Journalist
- Years active: 1943–1998

Will Tremper (19 September 1928 – 14 December 1998) was a German journalist and filmmaker (writer, director, producer). He wrote twelve screenplays between 1956 and 1988. The young and then unknown actor Horst Buchholz starred in his first three films. With only a handful of films to his credit, he established himself quickly as the German answer to the directors of the Nouvelle Vague in France.

== Biography ==
Will Tremper was born in Braubach, Germany to innkeeper Heinrich Tremper and his wife Emilie and died in Munich, Germany. Tremper arrived in 1944 in Berlin at the age of 16, to work as a photographer. He survived the war unharmed and started working for a newly established Berlin newspaper Der Tagesspiegel.

In the 1950s he started writing screenplays. His debut Teenage Wolfpack was a huge success and made Horst Buchholz a star. He financed his next four films by himself. With The Endless Night Tremper received the Bundesfilmpreis for best production of the year.

After his last film as director, How Did a Nice Girl Like You Get Into This Business? which was produced by Horst Wendlandt, he wrote several bestselling novels. Tremper further went on to work for German newspapers and magazines, such as Die Welt, Welt am Sonntag, Bunte, Stern and Quick. His weekly film column in Welt am Sonntag ran from 1980 to 1998.

In December 1998 Tremper died of a heart attack at his home in Munich.

== Selected filmography ==
- Teenage Wolfpack (dir. Georg Tressler, 1956)
- Two Worlds (dir. Georg Tressler, 1958)
- Wet Asphalt (dir. Frank Wisbar, 1958)
- People in the Net (dir. Franz Peter Wirth, 1959)
- Escape to Berlin (dir. Will Tremper, 1961)
- Deutschland – deine Sternchen (dir. Edwin Zbonek, 1962)
- The Endless Night (dir. Will Tremper, 1963)
- Stop Train 349 (dir. Rolf Hädrich, 1963)
- Room 13 (dir. Harald Reinl, 1964)
- Mark of the Tortoise (dir. Alfred Vohrer, 1964)
- Sperrbezirk (dir. Will Tremper, 1966)
- Playgirl (dir. Will Tremper, 1966)
- How Did a Nice Girl Like You Get Into This Business? (dir. Will Tremper, 1970)
- Rosinenbomber (dir. Eberhard Itzenplitz, 1988, TV film)

== Awards ==
- 1963: Preis der deutschen Filmkritik for The Endless Night
- 1963: Filmband in Silber (Production) for The Endless Night
- 1963: Bambi Award (Best Film) for The Endless Night
- 1964: Filmband in Gold (Drehbuch) für Stop Train 349
