= Stop Train 349 =

1963 film

- U.S. film poster
- Directed by: Rolf Hädrich
- Written by: Will Tremper; Jim Henaghan; Victor Vicas; Norman Borisoff
- Produced by: Hans Oppenheimer; Ray Ventura; Victor Vicas (english version)
- Starring: José Ferrer
- Cinematography: Roger Fellous
- Edited by: Georges Arnstam
- Music by: Claude Vasori; Peter Thomas
- Distributed by: Allied Artists Pictures
- Release date: June 1963
- Running time: 95 minutes
- Countries: West Germany; France; Italy
- Language: English

Stop Train 349 (German: Verspätung in Marienborn, French: Le train de Berlin est arrêté, Italian: Un treno è fermo a Berlino), is a 1963 internationally co-produced drama film directed by Rolf Hädrich. It was released in the US in 1964 by Allied Artists. It was entered into the 13th Berlin International Film Festival. Screenwriter Will Tremper won the Film Award in Gold of the 1964 German Film Awards. The film's sets were designed by the art director Dieter Bartels.

== Plot ==
An East Berlin refugee trying to escape to West Berlin sneaks aboard a train run by the US military and causes an international incident.

The film opens with US reporter Cowan driving through West Berlin . This is followed by impressions of the city, divided since the construction of the Berlin Wall in 1961. Cowan intends to report on his experiences in divided Berlin and the state of Soviet-American tensions. On board the American military train connecting the western zones of Berlin with Frankfurt am Main are international guests as well as train and military personnel from West Germany, East Germany, and the USA. During a conversation in the train's dining car, Cowan clashes with the American train commander, Lt. Novak, and Kathy, a nurse accompanying a temporarily blind, high-ranking US officer. The argument stems from Cowan's expressed contempt for all Germans because of their Nazi past. He denounces them as experts on walls and concentration camp barbed wire. While traveling through East Germany on the single-track main line, the train makes a brief stop at a passing loop . A 24-year-old man jumps out of his hiding place and clings to one of the train doors, which are secured and can only be opened from the inside. As the train starts moving again, the stranger bangs furiously on the door. Kathy, who is standing next to him inside the carriage, unlocks it and pulls the man inside. The stowaway introduces himself as an East German refugee.

Kathy helps him find a hiding place in a currently unused compartment. Cowan quickly figures this out and senses a huge story behind the young man's refugee tale, one he wants to exploit exclusively – even at the risk of Banner's life. The train then reaches Marienborn, a border checkpoint and dividing line between East and West, and stops. The Allied officers exchange documents, and an East German train conductor requests a brief meeting with his superior at the processing facility. As the train starts moving again, the Soviet officer immediately stops it because an East German citizen is allegedly missing from the passenger list shown by Novak. This is Banner, whose possible presence on board the East German conductor had just reported to his superior at the station. The Soviet officer then wants to personally inspect the train, which his American counterpart, Lt. Novak, refuses to allow. The Russian then denies the train permission to continue its journey.

Novak receives further instructions by telephone from his superior officer and points out that the Russians had already searched the train for unauthorized passengers upon entering East German territory. Soviet soldiers approach in a flash, surrounding the train with rifles at the ready. The US military police officers traveling on the train are then summoned and also positioned, armed, in front of the train. The Soviet officer's superior officer, Major Menshikov, who has just arrived, suggests that Novak search the train himself for the suspected stowaway, which he then does. Banner is quickly discovered, and Novak asks his superiors whether he should hand the East German refugee over to the Soviets. "Don't do anything," he is told, and that he should wait for further instructions. Shortly afterward, high-ranking US officers from the Military Liaison Mission arrive from Potsdam and discuss the case with their Soviet counterparts. The temporarily blinded US officer on the train advises his high-ranking colleagues to hand Banner, who has unlawfully gained access to the locked train, over to the Soviet authorities. This, he says, is in accordance with mutual agreements. The American civilians, eager to return to West Germany, are equally forceful and demand the extradition of the East German refugee so that the journey to Frankfurt can finally continue. Even the smug cynic Cowan is in favor of a swift resolution.

While the protracted negotiations between the Americans and Soviets continue in the signalman's hut, Banner manages to escape his American guard. He secretly leaves the train and crawls underneath it, where he is discovered. Running back and forth between American, Russian, and East German soldiers, he manages to jump back onto the train at the last second. Now the Russians know that there was indeed a stowaway on the train, and the situation becomes increasingly complicated. While the private passengers on the train change their minds about the escapee in his favor, Cowan seizes the opportunity and interviews Banner, who explains that he only fled the train so as not to be a burden to anyone else. Then the train lurches and starts moving. A brief burst of enthusiasm erupts among the passengers, which is immediately extinguished by Lt. Novak. The train, he explains, is merely being shunted onto a siding.

In the early hours of the following day, Novak and the refugee finally have their first extended conversation, and Novak's initial rejection and distance give way to something akin to understanding Banner's situation. Major Finnegan, negotiating for the Americans, is called to the telephone mid-conversation with his Russian counterpart. He is ordered to hand the East German over to the Russians. Finnegan then rushes back to the train. Furious, he confronts Cowan, pointing out that Cowan's gossip about the East German refugee on the train is already circulating in Berlin, leaving the Russians with no choice but to act decisively. Cowan denies any wrongdoing, claiming he kept silent. In fact, one of the West German train attendants proudly announces that he has passed on Finnegan's information to Berlin newspapers. Novak is now forced to break his promise to Banner not to extradite him. While the Russians withdraw their guards and the detached locomotive is returned to the carriages, Novak picks up Banner and, together with Sergeant Torre, escorts him to the Russians. They immediately hand him over to the East German People's Police (Vopos), who speed off with Banner in a car. Then the military train departs again.

== Cast ==
- José Ferrer as Cowan the Reporter
- Sean Flynn as Lt. Novak
- Nicole Courcel as Nurse Kathy
- Margaret Jahnen as Mrs. Stein
- Jess Hahn as Sgt. Torre
- Yossi Yadin as Maj. Menschikov (as Yoseph Yadin)
- Hans-Joachim Schmiedel as Banner
- Christiane Schmidtmer as Karin (as Christiane Schmidmer)
- Joy Aston as Mrs. Abramson
- Lothar Mann as East German Conductor
- Arthur Brauss as I.M.P. (as Art Brauss)
- Edward Meeks as Capt. Kolski
- Fred Dur as Maj. Finnegan
- Len Monroe as U.S. Soldier
- Wolfgang Georgi as Russian Officer Gorski
- Antonella Murgia as Teenager

== Production ==
The film was originally known as Marienborn. It was based on a true incident about an American train going to Berlin that was stopped in the Eastern sector and had a refugee removed.
