= Georg Tressler =

German film actor and film director

Georg Tressler (January 25, 1917 – January 6, 2007) was a Vienna-born German film actor and film director. Also known as George Tressler, Hans Tressler, Hans Dressler, Hans Georg Keil and Hans Sternbeck (per IMDb).

The son of actor Otto Tressler, he began his acting career in the 1930s. George Tressler was drafted into the German army during World War II and served on the Russian Front. He became ill and was released from the service and returned to Vienna.

In the immediated post-war period Tressler was employed making films to help his Austrian compatriots better understand how to benefit from US Marshall Plan aid. According to Maria Fritsche, author of "The American Marshall Plan Film Campaign and the Europeans: A Captivated Audience?" Tressler took special efforts to find ways to convince his audience accepting US aid was of genuine benefit to them. In particular, when he found Austrian farmers feared the techniques and technology used in America on much larger American farms was inapplicable to their much smaller farms Tressler found ways to show how those techniques could be adapted to Austrian farms.

When Tressler turned to directing feature films, many of them shared themes of youthful rebellion. His 1956 film Die Halberstarken/Teenage Wolfpack was one of the most popular films in Austria.

He directed nearly 80 movies during his lifetime, including The Death Ship (1959) with Horst Buchholz and Mario Adorf. He came to Hollywood and directed Disney's The Magnificent Rebel (1962). Other works include Teenage Wolfpack (1956) and 2069: A Sex Odyssey (1974). His 1966 film Der Weibsteufel was entered into the 16th Berlin International Film Festival.

He died on January 6, 2007, in Saxony, three weeks shy of his 90th birthday.

== Selected filmography ==
Director

- Teenage Wolfpack (1956) — screenplay by Will Tremper
- Unter Achtzehn (1957)
- Endstation Liebe (1958) — screenplay by Will Tremper
- Ludmila (1958) — based on the story by Paul Gallico
- The Death Ship (1959) — based on The Death Ship by B. Traven
- Geständnis einer Sechzehnjährigen (1961) — based on a novel by Robert Pilchowski
- The Magnificent Rebel (1961) — biographical film about Beethoven
- Das Kriminalgericht: Der Fall Krantz (1964, TV series episode)
- Das Kriminalgericht: Der Fall Calmette (1964, TV series episode)
- Das Kriminalgericht: Der Fall Nebe (1964, TV series episode)
- The Merry Wives of Windsor (1965) — based on Shakespeare's The Merry Wives of Windsor
- Gestatten, mein Name ist Cox (1965, TV series, 13 episodes)
- Kostenpflichtig zum Tode verurteilt (1966, TV film) — film about Jerzy Sosnowski
- Der Weibsteufel (1966) — based on a play by Karl Schönherr
- Ein Mann, der nichts gewinnt (1967, TV film) — screenplay by Michael Mansfeld
- Nationalkomitee "Freies Deutschland" (1968, TV film) — docudrama about the "National Committee for a Free Germany"
- Der Kommissar: Die Tote im Dornbusch (1969, TV series episode)
- Der Kommissar: Geld von toten Kassierern (1969, TV series episode)
- Der Baum von Kfar Etzyon (1969, TV film) — screenplay by Hellmut Andics
- Weh' dem, der erbt (1969, TV film) — remake of Mrs Thursday
- Der Kommissar: Die kleine Schubelik (1970, TV series episode)
- Keiner erbt für sich allein (1970, TV film) — remake of Mrs Thursday
- F.M.D. – Psychogramm eines Spielers (1971, TV film) — screenplay by Michael Mansfeld, biographical film about Dostoevsky
- Im Fahrwasser (1971, TV film) — screenplay by Helga Feddersen
- The Lift (1972, TV film)
- Tatort: Kennwort Gute Reise (1972, TV series episode)
- Graf Yoster (1974, TV series, 6 episodes)
- 2069: A Sex Odyssey (1974) (as Hans Georg Keil)
- Sweet Derriere (1975) (as Hans Georg Keil)
- Der Millionenbauer (1979–1980, TV series, 7 episodes)
- Tatort: Geburtstagsgrüße (1984, TV series episode)
- Sukkubus (1989)
- Schloß Hohenstein (1992–1993, TV series, 6 episodes)
- Marienhof (1994, TV series, 6 episodes)

Actor

- Men Are That Way (1939)
- Music in Salzburg (1944)
- Maresi (1948)
