= How Did a Nice Girl Like You Get Into This Business? =

1970 film

- A poster bearing the film's alternative title: The Naughty Cheerleader
- Directed by: Will Tremper
- Screenplay by: Will Tremper
- Based on: the novel "How Did a Nice Girl Like You Get Into This Business?" by Lynn Keefe
- Produced by: Horst Wendlandt
- Starring: Barbi Benton
- Cinematography: Richard C. Glouner; Karl Löb
- Music by: Klaus Doldinger
- Release date: 15 January 1970
- Running time: 105 minutes
- Countries: West Germany; Italy
- Language: English

How Did a Nice Girl Like You Get Into This Business? (German: Mir hat es immer Spaß gemacht (also: Wie kommt ein so reizendes Mädchen zu diesem Gewerbe?) and also known as The Naughty Cheerleader) is a 1970 West German comedy film directed by Will Tremper and starring Barbi Benton. It is based on the novel of the same title, written by Lynn Keefe.

== Cast ==
- Barbi Benton as Lynn Keefe (as Barbara Benton)
- Hampton Fancher as Gino
- Jeff Cooper as Bob Greene
- Broderick Crawford as B.J Hankins
- Marc De Vries as Ronnie
- Claude Farell as Mrs. Epstein
- Hugh Hefner as Himself
- Klaus Kinski as Juan José Ignatio Rodriguez de Calderon, 'Sam'
- Lisa Lesco
- Bruce Low as Ist Smirna brother
- Paul Muller as The Director
- Roman Murray as Frank
- Max Nosseck as 2nd Smirna brother
- Massimo Serato as Capitano
- Lionel Stander as The Admiral
- Clyde Ventura as Nick
- José Luis de Vilallonga as Mr. Epstein
- Leon Janney as Mr. McCarthy
- Horst Wendlandt as Reporter with cigar behind the hotel in Miami Beach (uncredited)
- Christian Anders (minor role)
