= Herr Puntila and His Servant Matti (1960 film) =

- German poster
- Directed by: Alberto Cavalcanti
- Written by: Bertolt Brecht (play); Hella Wuolijoki; Alberto Cavalcanti; Vladimir Pozner; Ruth Wieden
- Produced by: Heinrich Bauer; Herbert Kollmann
- Starring: Curt Bois; Heinz Engelmann; Maria Emo
- Cinematography: André Bac
- Edited by: Josef Juvancic
- Music by: Hanns Eisler
- Production companies: Heinrich Bauer-Film; Wien-Film
- Distributed by: Sascha-Verleih
- Release date: 21 October 1960
- Running time: 97 minutes
- Country: Austria
- Language: German

Herr Puntila and His Servant Matti (German: Herr Puntila und sein Knecht Matti) is a 1960 Austrian comedy film directed and co-written by Alberto Cavalcanti and starring Curt Bois, Heinz Engelmann and Maria Emo. It was made at the Soviet-controlled Rosenhügel Studios in Vienna. Production began in 1955, but wasn't completed until 1960. The film is based on the 1948 play Mr Puntila and his Man Matti by Bertolt Brecht which in turn is based on the 1940 Finnish play The Sawdust Princess by Hella Wuolijoki.

== Cast ==
- Curt Bois as Johannes Puntila
- Heinz Engelmann as Matti Altonen
- Maria Emo as Eva Puntila
- Erika Pelikowsky as Sandra
- Yelena Polevitskaya as Sandra Klinckmann
- Inge Holzleitner as Fina
- Dorothea Neff as Pröbstin
- Elfriede Irrall as Lisu
- Edith Prager as Manda
- Erland Erlandsen as L'attaché
- Karl Skraup as Josef, Apotheker
- Otto Schmöle as Richter
- Otto Wögerer as Bibelius
- Max Brod as Advokat
- Fritz Heller as Minister
- Gaby Banschenbach as Laina
- Josef Gmeinder as Arzt
- Aladar Kunrad as Polizeioberst
- Fritz Links as Probst
- Armand Ozory as Dentist
- Elisabeth Stiepl as Schmuggler-Emma
- Peter Sturm
- Robert Werner as Journalist
- Mela Wigandt as Apothekerin

== Bibliography ==
- Davidson, John & Hake, Sabine. Framing the Fifties: Cinema in a Divided Germany. Berghahn Books, 2007.
