= Hold Me Tight (2021 film) =

2021 French drama film

- Theatrical release poster
- French: Serre moi fort
- Directed by: Mathieu Amalric
- Written by: Mathieu Amalric
- Based on: Je reviens de loin by Claudine Galéa
- Produced by: Yaël Fogiel; Laetitia Gonzalez; Felix von Boehm
- Starring: Vicky Krieps; Arieh Worthalter; Anne-Sophie Bowen-Chatet; Sacha Ardilly
- Cinematography: Christophe Beaucarne
- Edited by: François Gédigier
- Release dates: 14 July 2021 (Cannes); 8 September 2021 (France)
- Running time: 97 minutes
- Languages: French, German
- Box office: $926,967

Hold Me Tight (French: Serre moi fort) is a 2021 French drama film written and directed by Mathieu Amalric, based on the play Je reviens de loin by Claudine Galéa. It stars Vicky Krieps as Clarisse, a woman who runs away from home for reasons that are not immediately clear. The film premiered in the Official Selection at the 74th Cannes Film Festival on 14 July 2021.

== Plot ==
At dawn one morning, Clarisse gets dressed and gathers her things, being careful not to wake her husband, Marc, or either of her children, Paul and Lucie. Lucie, an aspiring piano player, sees her leaving, but pretends to be asleep. Clarisse stops by a gas station to see a friend, who fixes up her car and asks if she is running away, vaguely referencing an event from two months prior. Clarisse replies that she is going to go to the sea.

The next morning, Marc, Paul and Lucie get dressed and go about their days as normal, not realizing anything is amiss. As Clarisse drives, she imagines conversations with each of them, to which they sometimes seem to reply as they go about their day. Clarisse arrives at the beach and gets drunk at a bar, and tries to imagine with fellow patrons how Marc will explain things to the kids. Friction grows between Marc and the children as months pass and it become increasingly apparent that Clarisse is not coming back. She occasionally narrates over their lives, and the family seems to respond to her narration as though they could hear it. Clarisse takes up various jobs for work, including as a tour guide for German language tourists. At one point, she lashes out at a tour guest for admonishing his child not to fidget.

In a flashback, it's revealed that Marc, Lucie and Paul died in a skiing accident when they were buried in an avalanche, and everything previously shown of their lives was actually imagined by Clarisse, coping with her family's death by imagining it was she who left instead of them. Clarisse had been at work, and was planning on joining them the next day, and is now suffering from extreme survivor's guilt. Police are unable to recover the bodies due to the deep snow. Clarisse remembers meeting Marc for the first time in a club, revealing that the car he took her home in is the same one she is now driving.

One day while walking, Clarisse sees a local choir group practicing, and takes an interest in their group's pianist, a girl who resembles Lucie. She is shown watching the girl get on the bus to go home. At a lounge, Clarisse meets a flutist, and they bond while watching a documentary on Martha Argerich. She unbuttons his shirt in the middle of the lounge, but simply rests her hand on his chest to feel his heartbeat before leaving.

Clarisse imagines Marc parenting Paul and Lucie as they grow into adolescence without her, though the Lucie in her imagination becomes a hybrid of the choir pianist and Martha Argerich. Lucie's teacher encourages her to audition for the Conservatoire de Paris. In the present reality, Clarisse returns to the ski resort as winter ends and the snow melts. She eats by herself at a table set for four, and her meal is interrupted by a German Shepherd barking outside.

Lucie travels to Paris to perform her audition, and Clarisse enters the judging room, taking a seat. Her presence causes Lucie to run out of the room. Clarisse goes to comfort her, but it's revealed that the "Lucie" who had been auditioning was actually the choir pianist, whose real audition for the Conservatoire de Paris Clarisse has interrupted. The girl and her parents say that Clarisse has been stalking and harassing the girl for months, and threaten to call the police unless Clarisse leaves. Clarisse whispers to herself "I have to do it all alone" before leaving.

The scene at the ski resort is replayed, except this time, the dog barking heralds the return of the search and rescue crew, carrying the bodies of Marc, Lucie and Paul. Clarisse breaks down screaming, crying and attacking the body bags. Finally returning home, a real estate agent helps Clarisse assess the house. She wraps up all the photographs she has of her family in Lucie's sheet music, gets in the car, and drives away. Over the credits, the sound of driving and music on the radio can be heard.

== Cast ==
- Vicky Krieps as Clarisse
- Arieh Worthalter as Marc, Clarisse's husband
- Anne-Sophie Bowen-Chatet as Lucie, Clarisse and Marc's daughter
  - Juliette Benveniste as adolescent Lucie and the choir pianist
- Sacha Ardilly as Paul, Clarisse and Marc's son
  - Aurèle Grzesik as adolescent Paul
- Aurélia Petit as Clarisse's friend at the service station
- Jean-Philippe Petit as the flutist

== Production ==
According to director Mathieu Amalric, the film was shot in segments months apart in order to capture multiple seasons, ending in February 2020.

== Release ==
The film premiered in the Official Selection at the 74th Cannes Film Festival on 14 July 2021. It had its official release in France on 8 September 2021. It was released in the United States a year later on 9 September 2022, and was released on VOD by Kino Lorber on November 22, 2022.

== Reception ==
=== Box office ===
Hold Me Tight grossed $74,723 in North America, and $852,244 in other territories for a worldwide total of $926,967.

=== Critical response ===
Hold Me Tight has received critical acclaim. On review aggregator Rotten Tomatoes, the film has an approval rating of 84% based on 45 reviews, with a weighted average of 7.3/10. The website's critical consensus reads, "Hold Me Tight trips over style while reaching for substance; fortunately, it has Vicky Krieps' stellar performance to keep it from falling down." On Metacritic, the film holds an 82 out of 100 rating, based on 13 reviews, indicating "universal acclaim".

Critic Michael O'Sullivan praised the film's depiction of grief in a 3 out of 4 star review for The Washington Post, describing it as a "strange and compelling film, a study of grief that somehow is at once moving and detached, in the way that people in mourning sometimes engage in denial-like displacement activities: behavior that's inappropriate to the emotion at hand." In her 3.5 out of 4 star review for IndieWire, critic Susannah Gruder credited both Amalric's direction and Kriep's leading performance, saying "[Kriep's] wispy elegance is tempered by a clumsy charm as she lovingly strokes her daughter's hair, or floats through the world in her newly-solo life. Her general state of dazed detachment gives weight to one particularly explosive outburst of anger and pain toward the film's end, devastating in its cathartic confrontation with reality."
