= Lina Loos =

Austrian cabaret actress and journalist

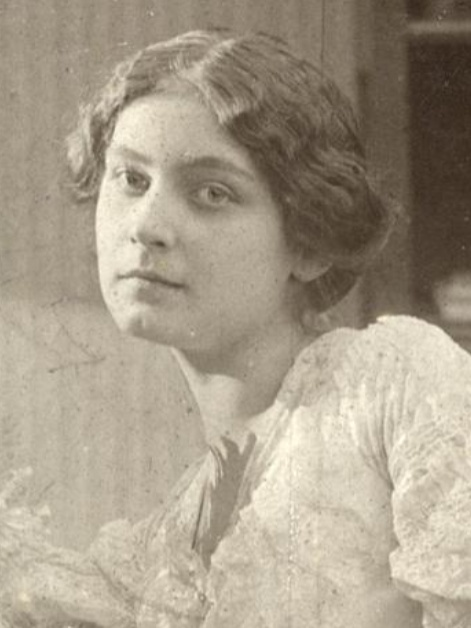
- Lina Loos in 1904
- Born: Carolina Catharina Obertimpfler; 9 October 1882; Vienna, Austria-Hungary
- Died: 6 June 1950 (aged 67); Vienna, Austria

Lina Loos (née Carolina Catharina Obertimpfler; 9 October 1882, in Vienna – 6 June 1950, in Vienna) was an Austrian cabaret actress and feuilleton journalist. She is best remembered for her appearances at the Linden-Cabaret in Berlin, and for her posthumous collection of writings edited by Adolf Opel. She was briefly married to Adolf Loos. Her life was the subject of the German film Lina (2017).

== Life ==
Carolina Obertimpfler was born on 9 October 1882 to Carl Obertimpfler, a coffee house owner.

In July 1902, she married architect Adolf Loos, who was twelve years her senior in Eisgrub. The furniture manufacturer Max Schmidt and his brother Karl Leo Schmidt served as witnesses. In 1903, she began an affair with 18-year-old student Heinz Lang. Lang had hoped Loos would break up with her husband and travel to him, but she wrote to him that she had changed her mind and refused to come. Afterwards Lang committed suicide.

Loos died on 6 June 1950 at Vienna General Hospital aged 67, after suffering from cancer.
