= Karl Schönherr =

Writer of Austrian Heimat themes

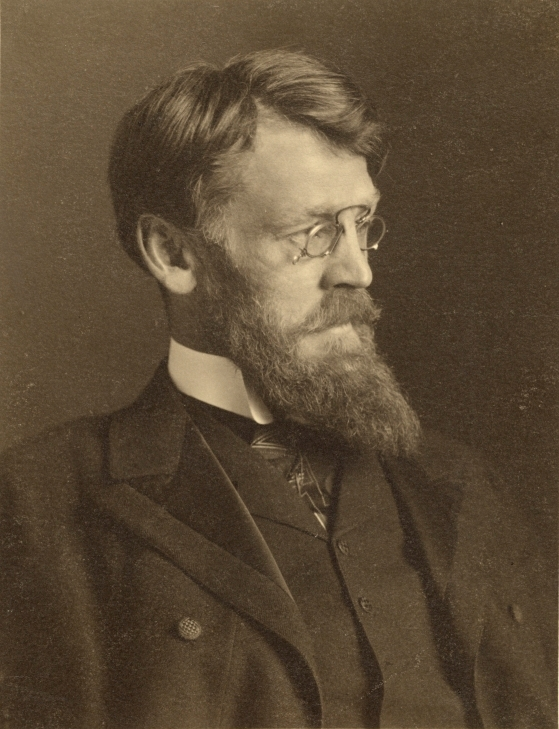
- Born: 24 February 1867; Axams near Innsbruck, Austria
- Died: 15 March 1943 (aged 76); Vienna
- Occupation: Medical doctor
- Writing career
- Genre: Heimat

Karl Schönherr (24 February 1867 - 15 March 1943) was an Austrian writer of Austrian Heimat themes.

== Biography ==
Schönherr was born in Axams, near Innsbruck (Austria), to Joseph and Marie Suitner Schönherr. He began studying philosophy in Innsbruck, then switched to medicine in Vienna, becoming a doctor in 1896. He worked in a hospital in St. Pölten before opening his own practice in Vienna. He gave up practising after the success of Der Bildschnitzer.

He experienced the poor living conditions of the people around him, especially during World War I, and wrote about these topics. Schönherr's works include protests against the Catholic church. He was also in favor of the Anschluss, but apparently did not share antisemitic tendencies. His wife Malvine (1867-1956) was Jewish.

=== Death ===
Schönherr died in Vienna. He is buried on the Zentralfriedhof (Group 14 C, #11).

== Works ==
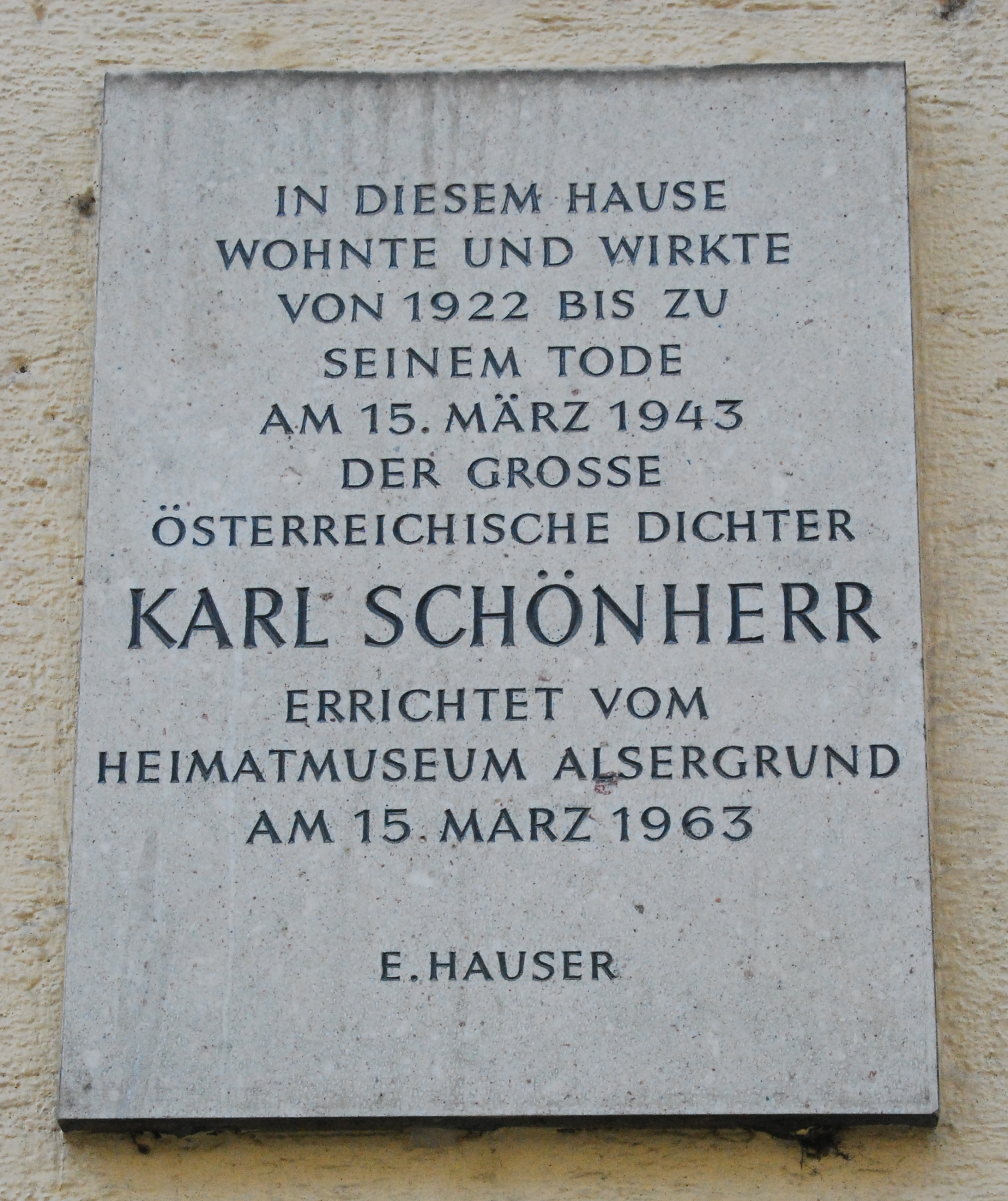
Plaque on the house of Karl Schönherr in Alsergrund, Vienna

- Der Judas von Tirol ("Judas of Tirol", 1897)
- Der Bildschnitzer: Eine Tragödie braver Leute ("The Woodcarver: A Tragedy of Good People", 1900)
- Die Altweibermühle: Ein deutsches Fastnachtspiel ("The Old Woman's Mill: A German Carnival Play", 1902)
- Der Sonnwendtag ("Solstice Day")
- Karrnerleut ("The Carters", 1904); later Kindertragödie ("Children's Tragedy", 1919)
- Familie ("Family", 1905)
- Erde ("Earth", 1908)
- Glaube und Heimat ("Belief and home", 1910)
- Der Weibsteufel ("The She Devil", 1914)
- Frau Suitner (Mrs. Suitner, 1922)
- Es ("It", 1923)
- Die Hungerblockade (1925)
- Volk in Not ("People in distress", 1926)
- Der Armendoktor (1927)
- Herr Doktor, haben Sie zu essen? (1930)
- Die Fahne weht (1937)

== Film adaptations ==
- Erde, directed by Emmerich Hanus (Austria, 1920, based on the play Erde)
- Glaube und Heimat, directed by Emmerich Hanus (Austria, 1921, based on the play Glaube und Heimat)
- Thy Name Is Woman, directed by Fred Niblo (1924, based on the play Der Weibsteufel)
- The Judas of Tyrol, directed by Franz Osten (Germany, 1933, based on the play Der Judas von Tirol)
- Earth, directed by Leopold Hainisch (Switzerland/Austria, 1947, based on the play Erde)
- A Devil of a Woman, directed by Wolfgang Liebeneiner (Austria, 1951, based on the play Der Weibsteufel)
- Frau Suitner, directed by Gustav Manker, Hermann Lanske (Austria, 1962, TV film, based on the play Frau Suitner)
- Der Weibsteufel, directed by Georg Tressler (Austria, 1966, based on the play Der Weibsteufel)
- Der Weibsteufel, directed by Jo Baier (Germany, 2000, TV film, based on the play Der Weibsteufel)
- Der Judas von Tirol, directed by Werner Asam (Germany, 2006, TV film, based on the play Der Judas von Tirol)
- Grenzgänger, directed by Florian Flicker (Austria, 2012, based on the play Der Weibsteufel)
