= A Devil of a Woman =

1951 film directed by Wolfgang Liebeneiner

- Directed by: Wolfgang Liebeneiner
- Written by: Wolfgang Liebeneiner; Karl Schönherr (play)
- Produced by: Heinrich Haas
- Starring: Hilde Krahl; Kurt Heintel; Bruno Hübner
- Cinematography: Günther Anders
- Edited by: Anried Heine
- Music by: Heinz Sandauer
- Production company: Styria Film
- Distributed by: Donau Film
- Release date: 28 September 1951
- Running time: 99 minutes
- Country: Austria
- Language: German

A Devil of a Woman (German: Der Weibsteufel) is a 1951 Austrian drama film directed by Wolfgang Liebeneiner and starring Hilde Krahl, Kurt Heintel and Bruno Hübner. It was entered into the 1952 Cannes Film Festival.

== Cast ==
- Hilde Krahl as Marei
- Kurt Heintel as Grenzjäger Florian
- Bruno Hübner as Anton Lechner
- Hermann Erhardt
- Franz Muxeneder
- Otto Bolesch
- Kurt Bülau
- Olga von Togni

== See also ==
- Thy Name Is Woman (1924)
- Der Weibsteufel (1966)
