= The Chambermaid Lynn =

2014 German film drama directed by Ingo Haeb

- Das Zimmermädchen Lynn
- Directed by: Ingo Haeb
- Screenplay by: Ingo Haeb
- Based on: Das Zimmermädchen Lynn by Markus Orths
- Produced by: Ingmar Trost; Olaf Hirschberg
- Starring: Vicky Krieps; Lena Lauzemis; Steffen Munster; Christian Aumer; Christine Schorn
- Cinematography: Sophie Maintigneux
- Edited by: Nicole Kortluke
- Music by: Jakob Ilja
- Production companies: Sutor Kolonko; 58Filme; Imok; WDR; Pandora Film; Torus
- Release date: 2 July 2014 (Filmfest München)
- Running time: 90 minutes
- Country: Germany
- Language: German

The Chambermaid Lynn (German: Das Zimmermädchen Lynn) is a 2014 German comedy-drama film written and directed by Ingo Haeb, adapted from Markus Orths' novel. It is about a maid (Vicky Krieps) who, while hiding in people's hotel rooms, happens to spy upon a session between a dominatrix (Lena Lauzemis) and her client (Christian Aumer). It premiered at the Filmfest München on 2 July 2014 and was released in Germany on 28 May 2015. It won two awards at the Montreal World Film Festival, including a FIPRESCI Prize.

== Plot ==
Lynn, a hotel maid, obsessively cleans the rooms, even when they do not have a guest staying in them. After work one day, she follows her manager, Heinz, home. Heinz is surprised to see her and reminds her that their relationship is over. Though she acknowledges this, she initiates sex, which Heinz goes along with. When not cleaning or with Heinz, Lynn watches old French comedies on her laptop and talks to an unnamed psychiatrist. During one of those sessions, it is revealed that she had previously checked herself voluntarily into a mental health clinic. Lynn has a somewhat strained relationship with her mother. When her mother is hospitalized, Lynn briefly visits her and says she is too busy to stay long.

While cleaning the rooms, Lynn snoops through guests' belongings and examines their personal effects. After nearly being caught while trying on clothing, she hides under a guest's bed. Instead of sneaking out while the guest showers, she reconsiders and returns to her hiding spot. Lynn continues to secretly observe guests until one day she spots a man, Ludwig, meet a woman, Chiara, in the lobby. Curious, Lynn races ahead of them and hides under the bed before they enter their room. Chiara turns out to be a dominatrix and Ludwig her client. From under the bed, Lynn listens to the sounds of their session. Chiara leaves her business card, and Lynn copies the phone number when Heinz enters the bathroom. When she returns home, Lynn repeatedly slams her hand against her bathtub's rim as she bathes.

Lynn calls Chiara and sets up an appointment. After discussing her work, Chiara asks how Lynn got her number. After drinking alcohol, Lynn admits she hid under the bed during Chiara's appointment with Ludwig. After rough foreplay, the two women have sex. As their sessions continue, Lynn becomes less inhibited. Heinz approaches Lynn and says that he has a girlfriend now, and Lynn reacts ambivalently. During another one of Chiara's appointments with Ludwig, Lynn hides under the bed. Chiara drops a pair of handcuffs as a pretext to look under the bed and sees Lynn. After the session, Chiara suggests that she bring a friend to their next session, but Ludwig declines.

After a session with Chiara, Lynn suggests that the two take a two-week vacation together. Lynn has already purchased tickets and offers to pay Chiara for her time. Lynn tells her not to respond yet but to think about it. Chiara leaves without saying anything. Lynn waits at the station for Chiara, but, when she eventually gives up, instead visits her mother's house. There, she tells her mother that she is not the person her mother believes her to be. That night, Lynn comes to her mother's bedroom and tells her that the reason she enjoys cleaning is because everything eventually becomes dirty again.

== Cast ==
- Vicky Krieps as Lynn
- Lena Lauzemis as Chiara
- Steffen Munster as Heinz
- Christian Aumer as Ludwig, the guest in the hotel
- Christine Schorn as Lynn's mother
- Sonja Baum as Silvia
- Alexander Swoboda as psychiatrist

== Release ==
The Chambermaid Lynn premiered at Filmfest München on 2 July 2014 and was theatrically released in Germany on 28 May 2015.

== Reception ==
Director Ingo Haeb said that different audiences have interpreted the film as either a comedy or a sad drama. Ronnie Scheib of Variety compared it to Secretary and Blue Is the Warmest Colour, concluding that it is more of a German fable. Boyd van Hoeij of The Hollywood Reporter called it "a modern Kammerspielfilm" that is similar to Bird People, as both films examine the monotonous and safe lives of maids after a disturbance. He describes the film's ending as "predictable emotionally" but moving.

At the Montreal World Film Festival, it won Best Artistic Contribution and the FIPRESCI Prize, World Competition.
