= Adam & Evelyn =

2018 drama film

- Directed by: Andreas Goldstein
- Screenplay by: Andreas Goldstein
- Produced by: Heino Deckert
- Starring: Florian Teichtmeister; Anne Kanis
- Cinematography: Jakobine Motz
- Edited by: Jakobine Motz
- Music by: Lars Voges
- Release date: 2018
- Language: German

Adam & Evelyn (German: Adam und Evelyn) is a 2018 German romantic drama film written and directed by Andreas Goldstein, at his feature film debut.

Based on the novel with the same name by Ingo Schulze, the film premiered at the 75th edition of the Venice Film Festival, in the Venice International Critics' Week sidebar.

== Cast ==
- Florian Teichtmeister as Lutz 'Adam' Frenzel
- Anne Kanis as Evelyn Schumann
- Lena Lauzemis as Katja
- Milian Zerzawy as Michael
- Christin Alexandrow as Simone 'Mona'
- Susanne Bredehöft as Gisela
