= Teenage Wolfpack =

1956 film by Georg Tressler

- Directed by: Georg Tressler
- Written by: Will Tremper (screenplay); Will Tremper (story); Georg Tressler (screenplay)
- Produced by: Wenzel Lüdecke (producer); Artur Brauner (associate producer)
- Starring: Horst Buchholz; Karin Baal
- Cinematography: Heinz Pehlke
- Edited by: Wolfgang Flaum
- Music by: Martin Böttcher
- Production company: Interwest
- Distributed by: Union-Film
- Release date: 27 September 1956
- Running time: 97 minutes; 89 minutes (US)
- Country: West Germany
- Language: German

Teenage Wolfpack (German: Die Halbstarken) is a 1956 German crime drama film directed by Georg Tressler. The film is also known as Wolfpack in the United Kingdom. It was shot at the Spandau Studios in West Berlin.

== Plot summary ==
The drama of a youthful triangle among gang leader Freddy (Horst Buchholz), his brother Jan (Christian Doermer), and bad girl Sissy (Karin Baal), in one of the first screen portrayals of juvenile delinquency in post-war West Germany.

== Cast ==
- Horst Buchholz (credited as Henry Bookholt in the US release) as Freddy Borchert
- Karin Baal as Sissy Bohl
- Christian Doermer as Jan Borchert
- Jo Herbst as Günther
- Viktoria von Ballasko as Mutter Borchert
- Stanislav Ledinek as Antonio Garezzo
- Mario Ahrens as Mario
- Manfred Hoffmann as Klaus
- Hans-Joachim Ketzlin as Willi
- Kalle Gaffkus as Kudde
- Wolfgang Heyer as Woelfi
- Paul Wagner as Vater Borchert
- Eduard Wandrey as Pepe Garezzo
- Friedrich Joloff as Theo
- Ruth Mueller as Rita
- Egon Vogel as Prillinger
- Gudrun Kruger
- Ingrid Kirsch
- Oskar Lindner
- Marion Lebens
- Editha Horn
- Heinz Palm
- Paul Bladschun

== Soundtrack ==
- Mister Martin's Band - "In Chicago"
- Mister Martin's Band - "Sissy Blues"
- Mister Martin's Band - "Mister Martin's Hop"
- Mister Martin's Band - "Swing Party"
