= Maria Emo =

Austrian actress (1936–2021)

Maria Emo (8 June 1936 – 4 December 2021) was an Austrian stage, film and television actor. She is the daughter of the actress Anita Dorris and the director E. W. Emo.

While she has mostly concentrated on the theatre, her best known film roles include playing Eva Braun in the 1962 film Hitler.

Emo died on 4 December 2021, at the age of 85.

== Selected filmography ==
- Bel Ami (1955)
- Marriage Sanitarium (1955)
- The Girl from the Marsh Croft (1958)
- Herr Puntila and His Servant Matti (1960)
- Hitler (1962)
- Der Weibsteufel (1966)
- Der Stille Ozean (1983)
