= The Endless Night =

1963 film

- Directed by: Will Tremper
- Written by: Will Tremper
- Produced by: Hanns Eckelkamp; Wenzel Lüdecke; Will Tremper
- Starring: Karin Hübner; Louise Martini; Harald Leipnitz
- Cinematography: Hans Jura
- Edited by: Susanne Paschen
- Music by: Peter Thomas
- Production companies: Will Tremper Filmproduktion; Inter West Film; Hanns Eckelkamp Filmproduktion
- Distributed by: Atlas Film
- Release date: 8 May 1963
- Running time: 85 minutes
- Country: West Germany
- Language: German

The Endless Night (German: Die endlose Nacht) is a 1963 West German drama film directed by Will Tremper and starring Karin Hübner, Louise Martini and Harald Leipnitz. It was shot on location at Tempelhof Airport in West Berlin. It premiered in the city's Marmorhaus cinema. It screened at the Locarno Film Festival later the same year.

== Synopsis ==
When a heavy fog descends on West Berlin's Temeplhof Airport, a group of passengers are stranded and have to wait out the night in the terminal for the weather to clear.

== Cast ==
- Karin Hübner as Lisa
- Louise Martini as Mascha
- Harald Leipnitz as Wolfgang Spitz
- Hannelore Elsner as Silvia Stössi
- Bruce Low as John McLeod
- Alexandra Stewart as Juanita
- Paul Esser as J. M. Schreiber
- Werner Peters as Herbert
- Walter Buschhoff as Ernst Kramer
- Lore Hartling as Frau Achtel
- Wolfgang Spier as Dr. Achtel
- Oscar Sabo as Hans Hardt
- Fritz Rémond Jr. as Emil Stoltmann
- Mario Adorf as Juanitas Bekannter
- Wolfgang Neuss as Bowlingbahnangestellter Wolfgang
- Rolf Hädrich as Kneipenwirt
- Wanda Warska as Sängerin
- Andrzej Trzaskowski Quintet Jazz Quintet
- Ulli Lommel as Junger Mann

== See also ==
- The V.I.P.s, a 1963 British film with a similar situation that takes place at London's Heathrow Airport

== Bibliography ==
- Geist, Kathe. The Cinema of Wim Wenders: From Paris, France to Paris, Texas. UMI Research Press, 1988.
- Lentz, Harris M. Feature Films, 1960–1969: A Filmography of English-Language and Major Foreign-Language United States Releases. McFarland, 2009.
