= Hitler (1962 film) =

Film by Stuart Heisler

- Theatrical release poster
- Directed by: Stuart Heisler
- Written by: Sam Neuman; E. Charles Straus
- Produced by: E. Charles Straus
- Music by: Hans J. Salter
- Color process: Black and white
- Production company: Three Crown Productions Inc.
- Distributed by: Allied Artists Pictures
- Release date: March 21, 1962
- Running time: 107 minutes
- Country: United States
- Languages: English; German

Hitler is a 1962 American biographical drama film directed by Stuart Heisler and stars Richard Basehart in the title role of Adolf Hitler, Cordula Trantow, Maria Emo and John Banner. According to film critic and historian Leonard Maltin, Basehart "gives a cerebral interpretation" of Hitler during the timeframe he was the leader of Nazi Germany. For her performance, Cordula Trantow was nominated for a 1962 Golden Globe in the category: Most Promising Newcomer - Female. The film was produced by Three Crown Productions, Inc. and distributed by Allied Artists Pictures.

== Plot ==
Depicting Hitler through the years, beginning with the Beer Hall Putsch of November 1923 and focuses mainly on his private life, in particular, his relationships with niece Geli and longtime companion/wife, Eva Braun.

== Cast ==
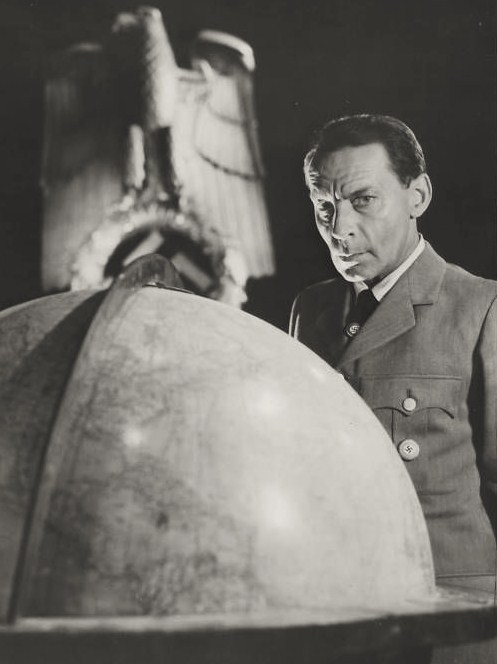
Martin Kosleck as Joseph Goebbels

- Richard Basehart as Adolf Hitler
- Cordula Trantow as Geli Raubal
- Maria Emo as Eva Braun
- Martin Kosleck as Joseph Goebbels
- John Banner as Gregor Strasser
- Martin Brandt as General Heinz Guderian
- John Wengraf as Dr. Theodor Morell
- William Sargent as Col. Claus von Stauffenberg
- Narda Onyx as Gretl Braun
- Gregory Gaye as Field Marshal Erwin Rommel
- Theodore Marcuse as Julius Streicher
- Berry Kroeger as Ernst Röhm
- Rick Traeger as Heinrich Himmler
- Lester Fletcher as Lt. Edmond Heines
- Celia Lovsky as Angelika Raubal
- John Mitchum as Hermann Göring
- Carl Esmond as Field Marshal Wilhelm Keitel

== Home media ==
This film was released on DVD via the Warner Archive Collection.

== See also ==
- List of American films of 1962
