= Before the Winter Chill =

- Directed by: Philippe Claudel
- Starring: Daniel Auteuil; Kristin Scott Thomas; Leïla Bekhti; Richard Berry
- Release date: 30 August 2013 (TFF)
- Running time: 103 minutes
- Country: France
- Language: French
- Budget: $8 million
- Box office: $2.6 million

Before the Winter Chill (French: Avant l'hiver) is a 2013 French drama film directed by Philippe Claudel.

== Plot ==
Philippe Claudel and Kristin Scott Thomas reunite in this subtle story of a man thrust into a mid-life crisis by a chance meeting.

Paul has never questioned his choices. Married right out of med school to the stunning Lucie, who set aside her own career to accommodate his brilliant one as a brain surgeon, he has been faithful, has earned the respect of his peers, raised a son and built a lovely home. Life is good.

One day a bar worker says she recognises him: he performed an appendectomy on her. Paul denies this as he is a neurosurgeon, but she says it was a long time ago and he admits he used to do some other surgery in the past. She is a little insistent and when he leaves she asks if he will return. He does not reply.

Bunches of red roses start to arrive for Paul at work, then at home. He discusses the situation with his wife but says they are, 'roses not death threats'. Nevertheless, when the next bunch of roses turn up on his car he throws them to the ground. When he sees the bar woman entering a florist he jumps out of his car and shouts at her. Another young woman steps in and says SHE was buying the flowers for the bar woman. Paul apologises and leaves.

After work, Paul goes to the woman's bar and waits for her. He says he is there to apologise again but he asks her out for a drink too. He finds out her name is Lou. Now, it seems, he can't resist the lure of an ambiguous and dangerous relationship with her.

Meantime, Lucie worries about her penniless sister who has mental health problems and her daughter-in-law who has become sad. Paul refers to 'her son' when she talks about this, although the man is 'our son', which illustrates Paul's distance from his family.

Paul becomes distracted at work and his manager suggests he takes a holiday thinking he is experiencing burn-out. Paul is drawn towards spending time with Lou, though initially, after seeing her with a colleague, Gérard, (perhaps as a client?), he grabs her and shouts at her on the street. Later, they meet when he has his granddaughter with him in a park. When his daughter-in-law approaches, Lou deliberately touches his arm and kisses him on the cheek.

Paul may be drawn to Lou's emotional frailty and her interest in art. Plus, of course, she is beautiful. Or perhaps he thinks of his own younger life and missed opportunities.

Lucie's sister is found half-naked on a roof and admitted to a secure hospital. Lucie calls up Gérard for comfort. Gérard points out she only calls him in the bad times, not the good. Later, Paul turns up.

Paul fails to see that his engagement with Lou could threaten everything he's built and everyone he loves, even though he rejects her advances. It is possible Lou only values herself through sexual encounters; during an earlier conversation (in a red light area) she said she only does such things when she hates herself. In the park, when he won't let her touch his face, she starts to cry and throws herself into his arms.

Lucie has followed Paul and sees this. Later she accuses him of having an affair. She also tells her daughter-in-law to leave her son if he makes her unhappy.

Paul tries to track Lou at college but finds out she is not a student. Paul finds her flat and she is quiet and has a fever. He looks after her (perhaps in contrast to how he did not do such things for his own son). Lou is surprised and apologises. He offers to help her but she says it is too late. She gives him a cassette she says was her grandmother's, a part of her that stayed pure. She says Paul is not like the others, but he must now go. Paul goes but leaves the cassette.

The police arrive and (in an unlikely move) take him to Lou's flat where she is seen dead in her bath, having slit her wrists. Paul is then interviewed by the police. They reveal that she was an orphan who worked with another woman to exploit, and later kill, rich men. The police say he came 'this close'. They ask if anything from the flat is his, showing objects on a desk. He points to the cassette and they let him take it.

Paul returns to work and tennis games. Victor asks who's winning and Lucie replies "your father". Victor is Gérard’s son. There is a dinner in the garden with all the family and Gérard and his partner. Gérard recalls it is 34 years since the three of them met. Paul walks up to the house to get cigars and looks in his coat pocket for them. He finds the cassette and puts it in a player. A voice is speaking and then singing a sad, slow song. His wife comes in and watches him.

The film received a 71% fresh rating on Rotten Tomatoes based on 17 reviews with an average rating of 5.7/10.

== Cast ==
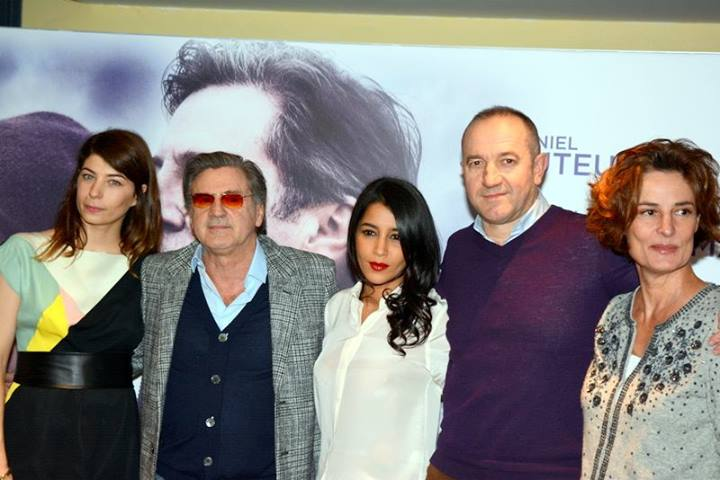
Avant l'hiver premiere in Paris

- Daniel Auteuil as Paul
- Kristin Scott Thomas as Lucie
- Leïla Bekhti as Lou
- Richard Berry as Gérard
- Laure Killing as Mathilde
- Jérôme Varanfrain as Victor
- Vicky Krieps as Caroline
- Anne Metzler as Zoé Gassard
- Annette Schlechter as Madame Malek
- Laurent Claret as Denis
- Jean-Louis Sbille as Fred
- Lucie Debay as Lou's friend
