= Lena Lauzemis =

German actress

Lena Lauzemis (born 15 January 1983) is a German actress. She has been in multiple films and television shows including If Not Us, Who?, Hitler Cantata, Wolffs Revier and Tatort. She has also been a regular performer with the Munich Kammerspiele.

== Selected filmography ==
- Hitler Cantata (2005), as Ursula Scheuner
- If Not Us, Who? (2011), as Gudrun Ensslin
- The Chambermaid Lynn (2014), as Chiara
- Deutschland 83 (2015), as Nina
- A Heavy Heart (2015), as Sandra
- Hidden Reserves (2016), as Lisa Sokulowa
- Adam & Evelyn (2018), as Katja
