= Ingeborg Bachmann =

Austrian poet and author (1926–1973)

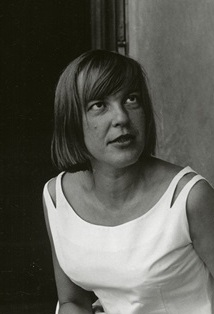
- Photograph of Bachmann by Mario Dondero (c. 1962)
- Born: 25 June 1926; Klagenfurt, Austria
- Died: 17 October 1973 (aged 47); Rome, Italy
- Education: University of Innsbruck; University of Graz; University of Vienna (PhD, 1950)
- Occupations: Poet, short story writer, novelist, translator, journalist
- Partner(s): Paul Celan (1950–1952, 1957); Max Frisch (1958–1963)
- Writing career
- Pen name: Ruth Keller
- Language: German
- Notable works: Die gestundete Zeit (1953, "Time Deferred"); Anrufung des großen Bären (1956, "Invocation of Ursa Major"); Malina (1971)
- Notable awards: Prize of the Group 47; 1953; Georg Büchner Prize; 1964; Anton Wildgans Prize; 1971

Ingeborg Bachmann (Austrian German: [ˈɪŋəbɔrɡ ˈbaxman]; 25 June 1926 – 17 October 1973) was an Austrian poet and author. She is regarded as one of the major voices of German-language literature in the 20th century. In 1963, she was nominated for the Nobel Prize in Literature by German philologist Harald Patzer.

== Early life and education ==
Bachmann was born in Klagenfurt, in the Austrian state of Carinthia, the daughter of Olga (née Haas) and Matthias Bachmann, a schoolteacher. Her father was an early member of the Austrian National Socialist Party. She had a sister, Isolde, and a brother, Heinz.

She studied philosophy, psychology, German philology, and law at the universities of Innsbruck, Graz, and Vienna. In 1949, she received her PhD from the University of Vienna with her dissertation titled "The Critical Reception of the Existential Philosophy of Martin Heidegger"; her thesis advisor was Victor Kraft.

== Career ==
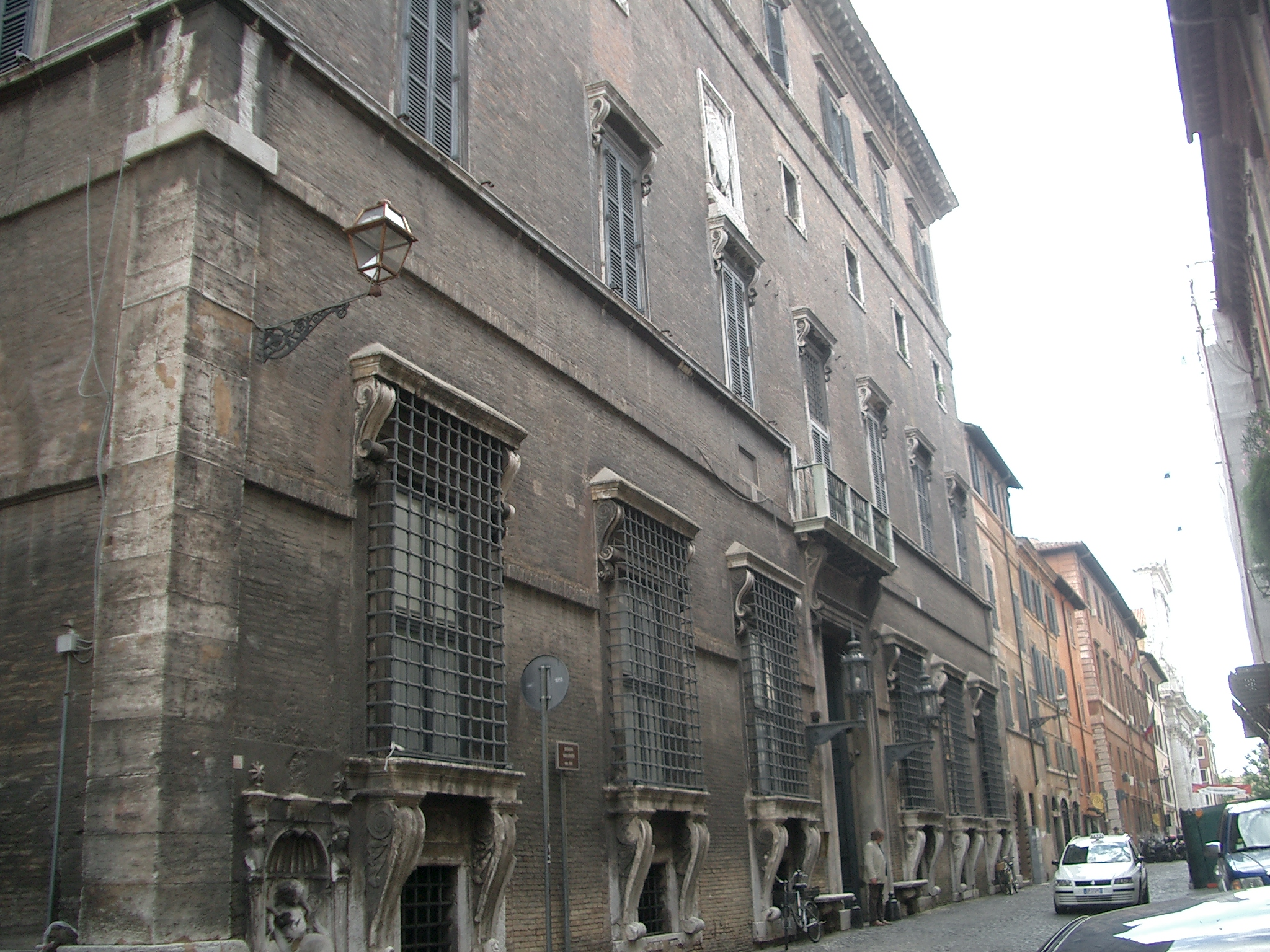
Ingeborg Bachmann's residence at Palazzo Sacchetti, Via Giulia, Rome

After graduating, Bachmann worked as a scriptwriter and editor at the Allied radio station Rot-Weiss-Rot, a job that enabled her to obtain an overview of contemporary literature and also supplied her with a decent income, making possible proper literary work. Her first radio dramas were published by the station. Her literary career was enhanced by contact with Hans Weigel (littérateur and sponsor of young post-war literature) and the literary circle known as Gruppe 47, whose members also included Ilse Aichinger, Paul Celan, Heinrich Böll, Marcel Reich-Ranicki and Günter Grass.

In 1953, she moved to Rome, Italy, where she spent the large part of the following years working on poems, essays and short stories as well as opera libretti in collaboration with Hans Werner Henze, which soon brought with them international fame and numerous awards.

=== Writings ===
Bachmann's doctoral dissertation expresses her growing disillusionment with Heideggerian existentialism, which was in part resolved through her growing interest in Ludwig Wittgenstein, whose Tractatus Logico-Philosophicus significantly influenced her relationship to language. During her lifetime, Bachmann was known mostly for her two collections of poetry, Die gestundete Zeit ("Time Deferred") and Anrufung des Grossen Bären ("Invocation of Ursa Major").

Bachmann's literary work focuses on themes like personal boundaries, establishment of the truth, and philosophy of language, the latter in the tradition of Wittgenstein. Many of her prose works represent the struggles of women to survive and to find a voice in post-war society. She also addresses the histories of imperialism and fascism, in particular, the persistence of imperialist ideas in the present. Fascism was a recurring theme in her writings. In her novel Der Fall Franza (The Case of Franza) Bachmann argued that fascism had not died in 1945 but had survived in the German speaking world of the 1960s in human relations and particularly in men's oppression of women. In Germany the achievements of the women's rights campaign at the end of the 19th and beginning of the 20th century had been systematically undone by the fascist Nazi regime in the 1930s. Bachmann's engagement with fascism followed that of other women writers who in the immediate post-war period dealt with fascism from a woman's perspective, such as Anna Seghers, Ilse Aichinger, Ingeborg Drewitz and Christa Wolf.

A crisis of Vergangenheitsbewältigung, along with the fear of the continued existence of National Socialism within democracy, suffuses Bachmann's oeuvre. In her work for radio, this takes the form of a self-conscious pivoting between the possibility of freedom and the inevitability of imprisonment. Her first radio play Ein Geschäft mit Träumen (A Shop for Dreams) is concerned with the inhumanity of violence and oppression. Der gute Gott von Manhattan (The Good God of Manhattan) consciously echoes Bertolt Brecht's The Good Person of Szechwan, as it tackles the impossibility of Good and Love surviving in capitalist, consumerist societies. In her analysis of Bachmann's radio drama Die Zikaden (The Cicadas), which was written in Ischia and then Naples towards the end of 1954, and first broadcast on Nordwestdeutscher Rundfunk (NWDR) on 25 March 1955, Lucy Jeffery states that

The transitory existence of the exiled or marginalised writer who escapes prejudice, conflict, and dominance is paralleled by the experience of the refugee. The feeling of unsettledness is measured against the desire to find that utopian land away (both geographically and temporally) from suffering. Yet, as Bachmann knows too well, escapism is a temporary heterotopia where guilt and longing cannot be kept at bay.

Similar themes can also be found throughout Bachmann's writings in works such as Ein Wildermuth (A Wildermuth), included in Das dreißigste Jahr (The Thirtieth Year: Stories, published in 1961), Malina (published in 1971), and Kriegstagebuch (War Diary, published posthumously in 2010).

Bachmann was also in the vanguard of Austrian women writers who discovered in their private lives the political realities from which they attempted to achieve emancipation. Bachmann's writings and those of Barbara Frischmuth, Brigitte Schwaiger and Anna Mitgutsch were widely published in Germany. Male Austrian authors such as Franz Innerhofer, Josef Winkler and Peter Turrini wrote equally popular works on traumatic experiences of socialisation. Often these authors produced their works for major German publishing houses. After Bachmann's death in 1973, Austrian writers such as Thomas Bernhard, Peter Handke and Elfriede Jelinek continued the tradition of Austrian literature in Germany.

=== Lectures ===
Between November 1959 and February 1960 Bachmann gave five lectures on poetics at the Goethe University Frankfurt. Known as the Frankfurter Vorlesungen: Probleme zeitgenössischer Dichtung (Frankfurt Lectures: Problems of Contemporary Writings) they are historically and substantively Bachmann's central work. In it she explained recurring themes in her early literary publications and she discussed the function of literature in society. Bachmann insisted that literature had to be viewed in its historic context, thus foreshadowing a rising interest in studying the connection between literary discourse and the contemporary understanding of history.

In the first lecture on Fragen und Scheinfragen (Questions and Pseudo-Questions) Bachmann focused on the role of writers in the post-war society and listed some essential questions that she defines "destructive and frightening in their simplicity". They are: why write? What do we mean by change and why do we want it through art? What are the limitations of the writer who wants to bring about change? According to Karen Achberger

Bachmann views the great literary accomplishments of the twentieth century as expressions in language and poetic form of a moral and intellectual renewal in the individual writers; it is the writer's new thinking and experiencing that forms the core of their literary works, and lets them come closer to a new language. (…) Bachmann stresses the need for a new language inhabited by a new spirit. (…) She also associates literary renewal with writers on the verge of silence due to self-doubt and despair over the impotence of language and she cites in this context Hofmannsthal's Ein Brief (1902) … as the first articulation of this dilemma.

In the second lecture, Über Gedichte (On Poetry), she distinguished poetry with its new power to grasp reality in its language, from other genres such as novels and plays. With reference to Günter Eich and Stefan George she identified a new generation of "poet-prophets" whose mission consisted in leading the world to the discovery of an "ever purer heaven of art" (George). Bachmann set these poets apart from the Surrealists who aspired to violence and the Futurists who claimed that "war is beautiful". She argued that these two movements exemplified art for art's sake and that the careers of Gottfried Benn and Ezra Pound exemplified the "easy friendship between pure aestheticism with political barbarism" (Achberger). She referenced Kafka on the need (with his words) to "take the axe to the frozen sea in us" and refuse to remain indifferent to the injustices that are perpetrated before our eyes. In the lecture she also named writings of Nelly Sachs, Marie Luise Kaschnitz, Hans Magnus Enzensberger and Paul Celan as examples of her concept of new poetry.

In the third lecture, on Das schreibende Ich (The writing I), Bachmann addressed the question of the first-person narrator. She was concerned with the "accountability and authority, the authenticity and reliability, of the person in the position of narrating the work" (Achberger). She distinguished between the unproblematic "I" in letters and diaries, which conceals the person from the author, and the unproblematic "I" in memoirs, in which a "'naive' handling of the first person is requested (Achberger). She argued that Henry Miller and Céline placed "themselves and their personal experience directly at the centre of their novels" (Achberger). She referenced Tolstoy's The Kreutzer Sonata and Dostoyevsky's The House of Dead as first-person narrators of the inner story. She also argued that narrators could provide a new treatment of time (for example Italo Svevo), of material (for example Proust) or of space (for example Hans Henny Jahnn). According to Bachmann, in the modern novel the "I" had "shifted: the narrator no longer lives in the story, but rather, the story lives inside the narrator" (Achberger).

In the fourth lecture, Der Umgang mit Namen (The close association with names), Bachmann explored how names could have a life of their own. She discussed the use of names in contemporary literature. She identified "denied names" such as in Kafka's The Castle, "ironic naming" by Thomas Mann, "name games" in Joyce's Ulysses and instances where the identity of the character is not secured by a name but by the context, such as in Faulkner's The Sound and the Fury.

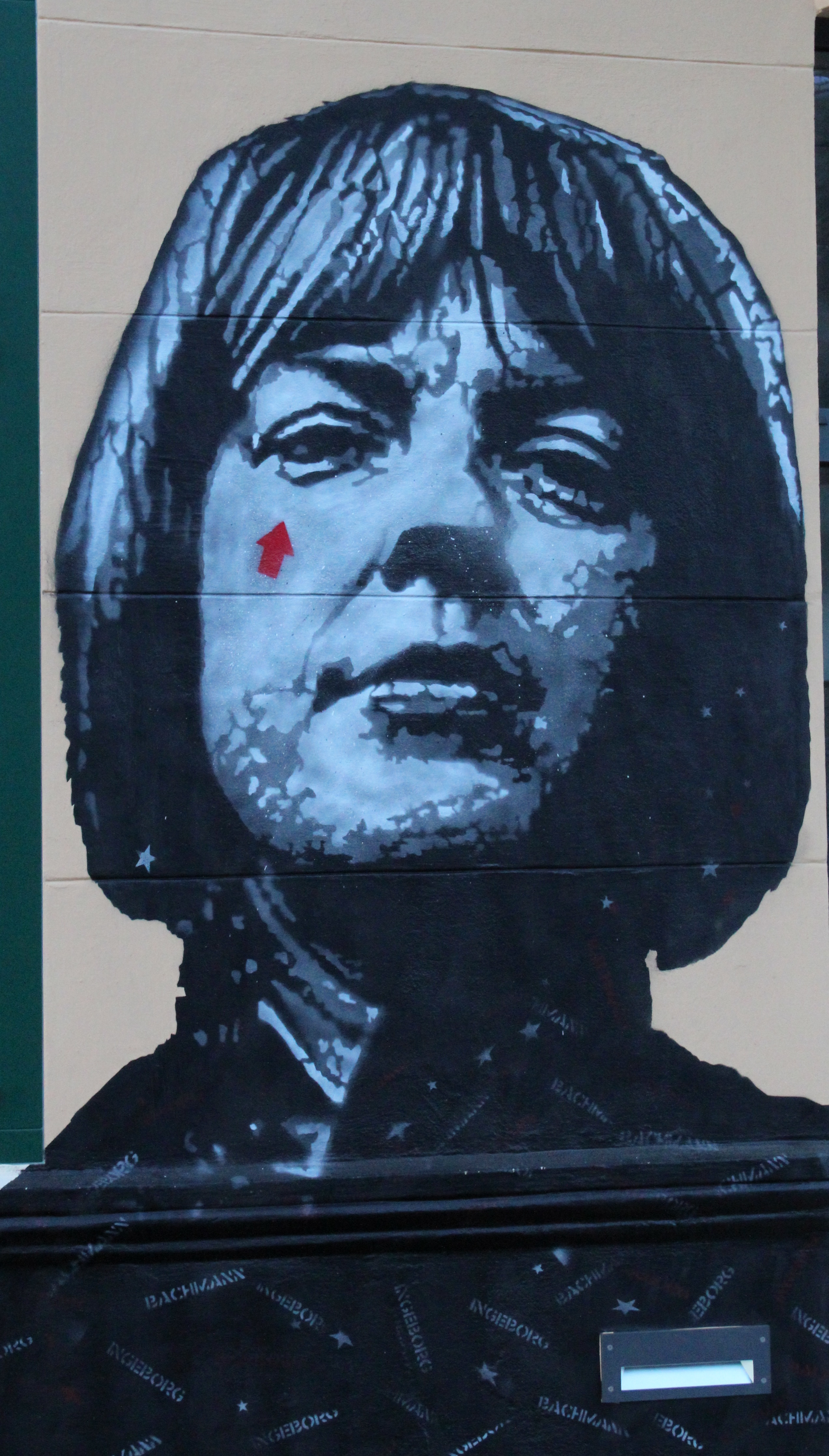
Graffiti portrait of Bachmann at the Robert Musil Museum in Klagenfurt.

In the fifth lecture on Literatur als Utopie (Literature as Utopia), she turned to the question of what makes literature utopian. She argued that it was the process that was set in motion in the writer and reader, as a result of their interaction with literature, which made a work utopian. She argued that literature could make us aware of a lack, both in the work and in our own world. Readers could remove this lack by giving the work a chance in our time. Thus she argued that each work of literature is "a realm which reaches forward and has unknown limits". Bachmann's understanding of utopia as a direction rather than a goal, and her argument that it was the function of literature to take an utopian direction, stemmed from Robert Musil, who had analysed European modernism in his 1908 dissertation on Ernst Mach, Beitrag zur Beurteilung der Lehren Machs (Contribution to the assessment of Mach's theories.

== Later life and death ==
During her later years she suffered from alcoholism and from an addiction to medication (barbiturates and benzodiazepines) prescribed by her doctor. A friend described it:

"I was deeply shocked by the magnitude of her tablet addiction. It must have been 100 per day, the bin was full of empty boxes. She looked bad, she was waxlike and pale. And her whole body was covered in bruises. I wondered what could have caused them. Then, when I saw how she slipped her Gauloise that she smoked and let it burn off on her arm, I realized: burns caused by falling cigarettes. The numerous tablets had made her body insensible to pain."

On the night of 25 September 1973, her nightgown caught fire and she was taken to the Sant'Eugenio Hospital at 7:05 A.M. the following morning for treatment of second and third degree burns. Local police concluded that the fire was caused by a cigarette. During her stay, she experienced withdrawal symptoms from barbiturate substance abuse, though the doctors treating her were not aware of the cause. This may have contributed to her subsequent death on 17 October 1973.

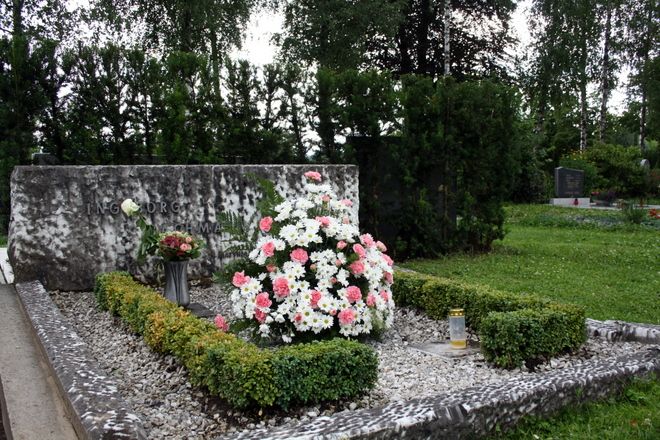
Grave of Ingeborg Bachmann at Zentralfriedhof Annabichl Klagenfurt

== Legacy ==
Although German language writers such as Hilde Domin, Luise Rinser and Nelly Sachs had published notable works on women's issues in the post-war period, it was only in the 1970s that a feminist movement emerged in West Germany. After her death, Bachmann became popular among feminist readers. Feminist scholars' engagement with her work after her death led to a wave of scholarship that also drew attention to her prose work. Her works gained popularity within the emerging Frauenliteratur (women's literature) movement which struggled to find the authentic female voice. New publishing houses carried the movement, such as the feminist press Frauenoffensive (Women's Offensive), which published writings by Verena Stefan.

In 2021, her childhood home on Henselstraße in Klagenfurt was purchased by the state of Carinthia, to be turned into a museum dedicated to her.

== Awards and recognition ==
- 1953: Prize of Group 47, for her poetry collection Die gestundete Zeit.
- 1957: Literaturpreis der Stadt Bremen (ex aequo with Gerd Oelschlegel).
- 1959: Hörspielpreis der Kriegsblinden.
- 1964: Georg Büchner Prize.
- 1968: Grosser Osterreichischer Staatspreis.
- 1972: Anton Wildgans Prize.

=== The Ingeborg Bachmann Prize ===
The Ingeborg Bachmann Prize, awarded annually in Klagenfurt since 1977, is named after her.

=== In film ===
The Dreamed Ones (Die Geträumten; 2016), is a feature film based on the almost 20-year correspondence between Bachmann and poet Paul Celan. It was directed by Ruth Beckermann and won the SCAM International Award at Cinéma du Réel 2016.

A biographical film, Ingeborg Bachmann – Journey into the Desert, starring Vicky Krieps as Bachmann and directed by Margarethe von Trotta, premiered at 73rd Berlin International Film Festival in February 2023, and gets a cinema release on 26 October 2023. The film focuses on her relationship with Max Frisch and the impact it had on her life. It also depicts her friends, composer Hans Werner Henze, and writer Adolf Opel, with whom she travelled to Egypt to experience the desert.

== Personal life ==
From 1945 to 1946, Bachmann fell in love with a former member of the British Army, the Viennese Jew Jack Hamesh. In May 1948 she began in Vienna a love affair with the poet and Holocaust survivor Paul Celan. In 1955 she met the political scientist Henry Kissinger; even though he was married and had two children, the two had a romantic relationship that lasted several years. From 1958 to 1963, she lived on and off with Swiss playwright Max Frisch. Her 1971 novel, Malina, has been described as a response, at least partially, to his 1964 novel Mein Name sei Gantenbein. She never married nor had children.

== Works ==
=== Poetry collections ===
- 1953: Die gestundete Zeit.
- 1956: Anrufung des Grossen Bären.
- 2000: Ich weiß keine bessere Welt. (Unpublished Poems)
- 2006: Darkness Spoken: The Collected Poems of Ingeborg Bachmann. translator Peter Filkins, Zephyr Press, ISBN 978-0-939010-84-4.

=== Radio plays ===
- 1952: Ein Geschäft mit Träumen.
- 1955: Die Zikaden.
- 1959: Der gute Gott von Manhattan (won the Hörspielpreis der Kriegsblinden in 1959).
- 2011: Die Radiofamilie.
  - The Radio Family, translated by Mike Mitchell (2014). ISBN 9780857421913.

=== Libretti ===
- 1960: Der Prinz von Homburg.
- 1965: Der junge Lord.

=== Collections of short stories ===
- Das dreißigste Jahr (1961).
  - The Thirtieth Year, translated by Michael Bullock (1964).
- Simultan (1972).
  - Three Paths to the Lake, translated by Mary Fran Gilbert (1989). The eponymous short story in this collection was adapted as a film by Michael Haneke in 1976.
- The Complete Stories, translated by Philip Boehm and Tess Lewis (New Directions, 2026).

=== Novel ===
- Malina (1971).
  - Malina. Translated by Philip Boehm (1990; revised 2019). ISBN 9780241366240.

=== Unfinished novels ===
- Der Fall Franza / Requiem für Fanny Goldmann (Piper, 1979).
  - The Book of Franza and Requiem for Fanny Goldmann, translated by Peter Filkins (Evanstons: Northwestern University Press, 2010). ISBN 978-0810127548.
- "Todesarten"-Projekt (Piper, 1995). Compiles:
  - Todesarten, Ein Ort für Zufalle, Wüstenbuch, Requiem für Fanny Goldmann, Goldmann/Rottwitz-Roman und andere Texte
  - Das Buch Franza
  - Malina (2 v. )
  - Der "Simultan"-Band und andere späte Erzählungen.
- Das Buch Goldmann, ed. by Marie Luise Wandruszka (Munich; Berlin: Piper; Suhrkamp, 2022). ISBN 978-3518426012.
- Das Honditschkreuz
  - The Honditsch Cross, translated by Tess Lewis (New Directions, 2025)

=== Essays, public speeches and interviews ===
- 1959: Die Wahrheit ist dem Menschen zumutbar (poetological speech at a German presentation of awards).
- 1955: Frankfurter Vorlesungen (lecture on problems of contemporary literature).
  - The Critical Writings of Ingeborg Bachmann, ed. and trans. by Karen R. Achberger and Karl Ivan Solibakke (Rochester, N.Y.: Camden House 2021). ISBN 9781571139443.
- 1983 [interviews from 1953–1973], Wir müssen wahre Sätze finden. Gespräche und Interviews, ed. by Christine Koschel and Inge von Weidenbaum (Munich: Piper, 1983). ISBN 9783492027243.

=== Letters ===
- Bachmann, Ingeborg; Henze, Hans Werner; Höller, Hans (2004). Briefe einer Freundschaft (in German). München: Piper. ISBN 3-492-04608-8. OCLC 56492391.
- ——; Celan, Paul; Celan-Lestrange, Gisèle; Frisch, Max; Badiou, Bertrand (2008). Herzzeit : Ingeborg Bachmann, Paul Celan, der Briefwechsel : mit den Briefwechseln zwischen Paul Celan und Max Frisch sowie zwischen Ingeborg Bachmann und Gisele Celan-Lestrange (in German). Frankfurt am Main: Suhrkamp. ISBN 978-3-518-42033-1. OCLC 244654481.
  - ——; Celan, Paul; Badiou, Bertrand (2010). Correspondence : Ingeborg Bachmann and Paul Celan : with the correspondences between Paul Celan and Max Frisch and between Ingeborg Bachmann and Gisèle Celan-Lestrange. London: Seagull Books. ISBN 978-1-906497-44-6. OCLC 457149489.
- ——; Bischof, Peter (1991). Briefe an Felician. München: Piper. ISBN 3-492-03585-X. OCLC 28093251.
  - ——; Searls, Damion (2004). Letters to Felician. København: Green Integer. ISBN 1-931243-16-6. OCLC 55591384.
- ——; Höller, Hans (2010). Kriegstagebuch : mit Briefen von Jack Hamesh an Ingeborg Bachmann (in German). Berlin: Suhrkamp. ISBN 978-3-518-42145-1. OCLC 613308412.
  - ——; Hamesh, Jack; Höller, Hans; Mitchell, Mike (2011). War diary : with letters from Jack Hamesh. London: Seagull Books. ISBN 978-0-85742-008-4. OCLC 758953009.
- ——; Schiffermüller, Isolde; Pelloni, Gabriella (2017). "Male oscuro" : Aufzeichnungen aus der Zeit der Krankheit : Traumnotate, Briefe, Brief- und Redeentwürfe (in German). München. ISBN 978-3-518-42602-9. OCLC 988090978.
- ——; Frisch, Max; Höller, Hans; Langer, Renate; Strässle, Thomas; Wiedemann, Barbara (2022). »Wir haben es nicht gut gemacht.« der Briefwechsel : mit Briefen von Verwandten, Freunden und Bekannten (in German). München. ISBN 978-3-518-43069-9. OCLC 1350789492.

=== Doctoral Dissertation ===
- Bachmann, Ingeborg; Pichl, Robert; Wallner, Friedrich (1985). Die kritische Aufnahme der Existentialphilosophie Martin Heideggers (in German). München: Piper. ISBN 3-492-02786-5. OCLC 19351796.

== See also ==
- List of Austrian writers
- List of Austrians
