= If Not Us, Who? =

2011 film

- Film poster
- Directed by: Andres Veiel
- Written by: Andres Veiel
- Starring: August Diehl
- Cinematography: Judith Kaufmann
- Edited by: Hansjörg Weißbrich
- Music by: Annette Focks
- Release dates: 17 February 2011 (Berlinale); 10 March 2011 (Germany)
- Country: Germany
- Language: German

If Not Us, Who? (German: Wer wenn nicht wir) is a 2011 German drama film directed by Andres Veiel and starring August Diehl. The film is set in the late 1940s, the early 1960s, and at the beginning of the Protests of 1968.

The film premiered In Competition at the 61st Berlin International Film Festival and was nominated for the Golden Bear. Veiel won the Alfred Bauer Prize at the Berlinale. The film had its US premiere at the Berlin and Beyond film festival in San Francisco on 26 October 2011.

== Cast ==
- August Diehl as Bernward Vesper
- Lena Lauzemis as Gudrun Ensslin
- Alexander Fehling as Andreas Baader
- Alexander Khuon as Rudi Dutschke
- Rainer Bock as Defense lawyer
- Sebastian Blomberg as Klaus Roehler
- Maria-Victoria Dragus as Ruth Ensslin
- Thomas Thieme as Father Vesper
- Joachim Paul Assböck as Journalist
- Hanno Koffler as Uli Ensslin
- Heike Hanold-Lynch as Mentor of G. Ensslin
- Hark Bohm as Critic
- Imogen Kogge as Mother Vesper
- Susanne Lothar as Mother Ensslin
- Henriette Nagel
