= Rolf Hädrich =

German film director

- Born: 24 April 1931; Zwickau, Germany
- Died: 29 October 2000 (aged 69); Hamburg, Germany
- Occupations: Film director Screenwriter
- Years active: 1958-1989

Rolf Hädrich (24 April 1931 – 29 October 2000) was a German film director and screenwriter. He directed 39 films between 1958 and 1989. His film Verspätung in Marienborn (US title: Stop Train 349) was entered into the 13th Berlin International Film Festival.

== Selected filmography ==
=== Film ===
- Stop Train 349 (1963)
- The Endless Night (1963, as actor)
- Among the Cinders (1983)

=== Television ===
- Der Dank der Unterwelt (1958) — (remake of Berkely Mather's Tales from Soho: Slippy Fives, 1956)
- Die Abwerbung (1958) — (screenplay by Erich Kuby)
- Das Rennen (1959) — (based on the play Sammy by Ken Hughes)
- Ein unbeschriebenes Blatt (1959) — (based on a play by Jean-Pierre Conty)
- Kopfgeld (1959) — (screenplay by Horst Mönnich)
- Die Gerechten (1959) — (based on The Just Assassins)
- Die Stimme aus dem Hut (1959) — (based on a play by Berkely Mather)
- Wer überlebt, ist schuldig (1960) — (screenplay by Axel Eggebrecht)
- Bedienung, bitte! (1960) — (based on Room Service)
- Die Friedhöfe (1960) — (based on The Graveyard by Marek Hłasko)
- Parkstraße 13 (1960) — (based on a play by Axel Ivers)
- Brennpunkt (1961) — (based on Focus)
- Karol (1962) — (based on a play by Sławomir Mrożek)
- Nachruf auf Jürgen Trahnke (1962) — (screenplay by Dieter Meichsner)
- Der Gefangene (1962) — (remake of Bridget Boland's The Prisoner, 1955)
- Child of the Revolution (1962) — (based on a non-fiction book by Wolfgang Leonhard)
- Der Schlaf der Gerechten (1962) — (based on Das Brandopfer by Albrecht Goes)
- Warten auf Godot (1963) — (based on Waiting for Godot)
- Haben (1964) — (based on a play by Gyula Háy)
- Murke's Collected Silences (1964) — (based on Murke's Collected Silences)
- Nach Ladenschluss (1964) — (screenplay by Dieter Meichsner)
- Die Schlinge (1964) — (remake of Marek Hłasko's Noose, 1958)
- Der neue Mann (1965) — (based on Patterns)
- Die Grenzziehung (1966) — (based on a play by Sławomir Mrożek)
- Unser Sohn Nicki (1966, TV miniseries)
- Herr Puntila und sein Knecht Matti (1966) — (based on Mr Puntila and his Man Matti)
- Zuchthaus (1967) — (based on a novel by Henry Jaeger)
- Heydrich in Prag (1967) — (screenplay by Peter Adler, docudrama about Operation Anthropoid)
- Kraft des Gesetzes (1968) — (based on a play by Henri Debluë)
- Mord in Frankfurt (1968)
- Von Mäusen und Menschen (1968) — (based on Of Mice and Men)
- Count Oederland (1968) — (based on a play by Max Frisch)
- Alma Mater (1969) — (screenplay by Dieter Meichsner)
- Jana (1970) — (screenplay by Manfred Bieler)
- Biografie: Ein Spiel (1970) — (based on a play by Max Frisch)
- Kennen Sie Georg Linke? (1971) — (screenplay by Dieter Meichsner)
- Die Stimme hinter dem Vorhang (1971) — (based on The Voice Behind the Screen by Gottfried Benn)
- Memories of a Summer in Berlin (1972) — (based on You Can't Go Home Again)
- The Fish Can Sing (1973) — (based on The Fish Can Sing)
- Der Stechlin (1975, TV miniseries) — (based on Der Stechlin)
- Jauche und Levkojen (1978, TV series, co-directors: Günter Gräwert, Rainer Wolffhardt) — (based on a novel by Christine Brückner)
- Mach's gut, Florian (1978) — (screenplay by Michael Juncker)
- Nirgendwo ist Poenichen (1980, TV series, co-directors: Günter Gräwert, Rainer Wolffhardt) — (based on a novel by Christine Brückner)
- Das wiedergefundene Paradies (1980, TV miniseries) — (based on a novel by Halldór Laxness)
- Bergpredigt (1983) — (screenplay by Dieter Meichsner)
- Backfischliebe (1985) — (based on Calf Love by Vernon Bartlett)
- Friedenspolka (1987) — (screenplay by Matthias Esche)
- Langusten (1989) — (based on a play by Fred Denger)
