= Christine Brückner =

German writer

- Born: 10 December 1921; Bad Arolsen, Free State of Waldeck-Pyrmont
- Died: 21 December 1996 (aged 75); Kassel, Hesse
- Spouse(s): Werner Brückner; Otto Heinrich Kühner
- Writing career
- Language: German
- Notable work: Before the Traces Disappear (Ehe die Spuren verwehen)

Christine Brückner (10 December 1921 - 21 December 1996) was a German writer.

== Life ==
Christine Emde was born to Pastor Carl Emde and his wife Clodtilde, at Schmillinghausen, near Arolsen in the Free State of Waldeck-Pyrmont. Her father belonged to the Confessing Church. The family moved to Kassel in 1934 and she completed her Abitur (high-school graduation) there in 1941.

Brückner was drafted for service in the General Command in Kassel during WWII and later worked as a bookkeeper in an aircraft factory in Halle.

After the war, she earned a diploma as a librarian in Stuttgart. She studied economics, literature, art history, and psychology in Marburg, where she also served as director of the Mensa Academica for two semesters. During that time, she wrote articles for the Nuremberg-based magazine Frauenwelt (Women's World).

From 1948 to 1958, she was married to the industrial designer Werner Brückner (1920-1977). During this time she wrote her first novel. In 1960 she returned to Kassel. She married her second husband, and fellow writer, Otto Heinrich Kühner (1921-1996) in 1967. The couple collaborated on several works.

From 1980 to 1984, Brückner was Vice-President of the German PEN Center. She was also an honorary citizen of the city of Kassel.

In 1984, the couple established the Brückner-Kühner Foundation. Since 1985, it has awarded the Kassel Literary Prize for "grotesque and comic work" at a high artistic level. The Foundation, now located in the house in which Christine Brückner and her husband lived, serves as a center for comic literature and is also a small museum.

Brückner died in 1996. The couple are buried in Schmillinghausen.

== Major works ==
Christine Brückner's work focused on the fundamental conflicts between humans, particularly from a woman's perspective, while reflecting the author's Protestant worldview.

Brückner's first novel, Before the Traces Disappear (Ehe die Spuren verwehen, Gütersloh, 1954), allowed her to make a living as a freelance writer. The manuscript won a competition run by the publisher Bertelsmann. It has since been translated into several languages. It tells the story of a man who is involved in the accidental death of a young woman and his existential crisis which follows.

She then published a number of other novels, which focus mainly on the topics of love, marriage and relationships from a woman's perspective, and on the possibilities for female self-realization.

In 1975, she wrote Manure and Stock (Ffm / Bln.), followed by its sequels, Nowhere is Poenichen (Ffm / Bln. 1977) and The Quints (Ffm / Bln. 1985), which formed the best-selling Poenichen trilogy. The trilogy tells the life story of Maximiliane Quint, born in 1918, the granddaughter of an aristocratic landowner in Pomerania. In 1977 and 1978 Manure and Stock and Nowhere is Poenichen were filmed as a mini-series for television, featuring actors Ulrike Bliefert, Arno Assmann and Edda Seippel in leading roles.

Her series of monologues Desdemona - if you had only spoken; Eleven uncensored speeches of eleven incensed women (Hamburg, 1983) was translated into English by Eleanor Bron in 1992. It established Brückner as a playwright. The monologues are by or addressed to eleven historical and fictional women of Western cultural history, including Clytemnestra, Christiane von Goethe and Gudrun Ensslin.

Brückner also published autobiographical works, plays and children's books.

== Awards and honors ==
- 1954 Bertelsmann Prize contest for Before the Traces Disappear
- 1982 Goethe-Plakette des Landes Hessen
- 1987 Honorary Citizen of the city of Kassel
- 1990 Hessian Order of Merit
- 1991 Federal Cross of Merit 1st Class
- 1996 Grand Federal Cross of Merit

== Works ==
=== Works in English ===
- Flight of cranes, Fromm International Pub. Corp., 1982, ISBN 978-0-88064-001-5
- Gillyflower kid: a novel, Fromm International Pub. Corp., 1982, ISBN 978-0-88064-006-0
- The time of the Leonids, Charles River Books, 1981, ISBN 978-0-89182-040-6

=== Stories and novels ===
- Ehe die Spuren verwehen, 1954 (Before the traces disappear)
- Katharina und der Zaungast, 1957 (Catherine and the onlooker)
- Ein Frühling im Tessin, 1960 (A Spring in Ticino)
- Die Zeit danach, 1961 (The aftermath)
- Bella Vista und andere Erzählungen, 1963 (Bella Vista and Other Stories)
- Letztes Jahr auf Ischia, (Last year at Ischia) Ullstein Verlag, Frankfurt/Berlin/Wien 1964 ISBN 3-548-02734-2
- Der Kokon, 1966 (The cocoon)
- Das glückliche Buch der a.p., 1970 (The Happy Book of a.p.)
- Überlebensgeschichten, 1973 (Survival Stories)
- Jauche und Levkojen, 1975 (Manure and stock)
- Die Mädchen aus meiner Klasse, 1975 (The girls in my class)
- Nirgendwo ist Poenichen, 1977 (Nowhere is Poenichen)
- Was ist schon ein Jahr. Frühe Erzählungen, 1984 (What's a year. Early Stories)
- Das eine sein, das andere lieben, 1981 (Be the one, the other love)
- Die Quints, Ullstein, 1985, ISBN 978-3-550-06397-8 (The Quints)
- Die letzte Strophe, 1989 (The last stanza)
- Früher oder später, 1994 (Sooner or later)

=== Dramatic monologues ===
- Wenn du geredet hättest, Desdemona - Ungehaltene Reden ungehaltener Frauen (If you had Spoken, Desdemona - Indignant Speeches, Indignant Women) Hoffman and Campe, Hamburg 1983 ISBN 3-455-00366-4

=== Child and youth books ===
- Alexander der Kleine. Eine heitere Erzählung, (Alexander the Little One. An amusing story) 1966
- A brother for Momoko. London: The Bodley Head 1970 (dt.: Ein Bruder für Momoko, 1981)
- Wie Sommer und Winter, (As Summer and Winter) 1971
- Momoko und Chibi, (Momoko and Chibi) 1974
- Die Weltreise der Ameise, (The world tour of the ant) 1974
- Momoko ist krank, (Momoko is sick) 1979
- Mal mir ein Haus with Otto Heinrich Kühner, (Paint me a house) 1980
- Momoko und der Vogel, (Momoko and Bird) 1982

=== Publishing activities ===
- Botschaften der Liebe in deutschen Gedichten des 20. Jahrhunderts, (Messages of love in German poems of the 20th Century) 1960.
- An mein Kind. Deutsche Gedichte des 20. Jahrhunderts, (To my child. German poems of the 20th Century) 1962
- Juist. Ein Lesebuch, (Juist. A readbook) 1984
- Lesezeit. Eine persönliche Anthologie, (Reading time. A personal anthology) 1986

== Literature ==
- Gunther Tietz (ed.): Über Christine Brückner. Aufsätze, Rezensionen, Interviews. Second edition. Frankfurt: Ullstein, 1990 (= Ullstein-Buch; 22173), ISBN 3-548-22173-4
- Margaritha Jacobaeus: „Zum Lesen empfohlen“. Lesarten zu Christine Brückners Poenichen-Trilogie. Eine rezeptionsästhetische Studie. Stockholm: Almqvist and Wiksell International, 1995 (= Stockholmer germanistische Forschungen; 51), ISBN 91-22-01671-6
- Karin Müller: „Das Leben hält sich oft eng an die Literatur“. Die Archetypen in den Poenichen-Romanen Christine Brückners. Glienicke/Berlin etc.: Galda und Wilch, 2000, ISBN 3-931397-26-2
- Elwira Pachura: Polen - die verlorene Heimat. Zur Heimatproblematik bei Horst Bienek, Leonie Ossowski, Christa Wolf, Christine Brückner. Stuttgart: ibidem-Verlag, 2002, ISBN 3-89821-205-X
- Pawel Zimniak: Die verlorene Zeit im verlorenen Reich. Christine Brückners Familiensaga und Leonie Ossowskis Familienchronik. Zielona Góra: Wydaw. Wyzszej szkoły pedagog., 1996, ISBN 83-86832-13-4
- Friedrich W. Block (ed.): Christine Brückner und Otto Heinrich Kühner. „Der einzige funktionierende Autorenverband“. Kassel: euregioverlag, 2007, ISBN 978-3-933617-31-6
