= Der Weibsteufel (1966 film) =

1966 film

- Directed by: Georg Tressler
- Written by: Karl Schönherr (play); Adolf Opel; Wilhelm Sorger; Georg Tressler
- Produced by: Otto Dürer
- Starring: Maria Emo
- Cinematography: Sepp Riff
- Edited by: Hermine Diethelm
- Release date: 28 April 1966
- Running time: 91 minutes
- Country: Austria
- Language: German

Der Weibsteufel is a 1966 Austrian drama film directed and co-written by Georg Tressler. It was entered into the 16th Berlin International Film Festival.

== Cast ==
- Maria Emo
- Sieghardt Rupp
- Hugo Gottschlich
- Vera Complojer (as Vera Comployer)
- Richard Tomaselli
- Margarete Reimann
- Gottfried Rieder
