= Adolf Opel =

Austrian writer, filmmaker, and editor

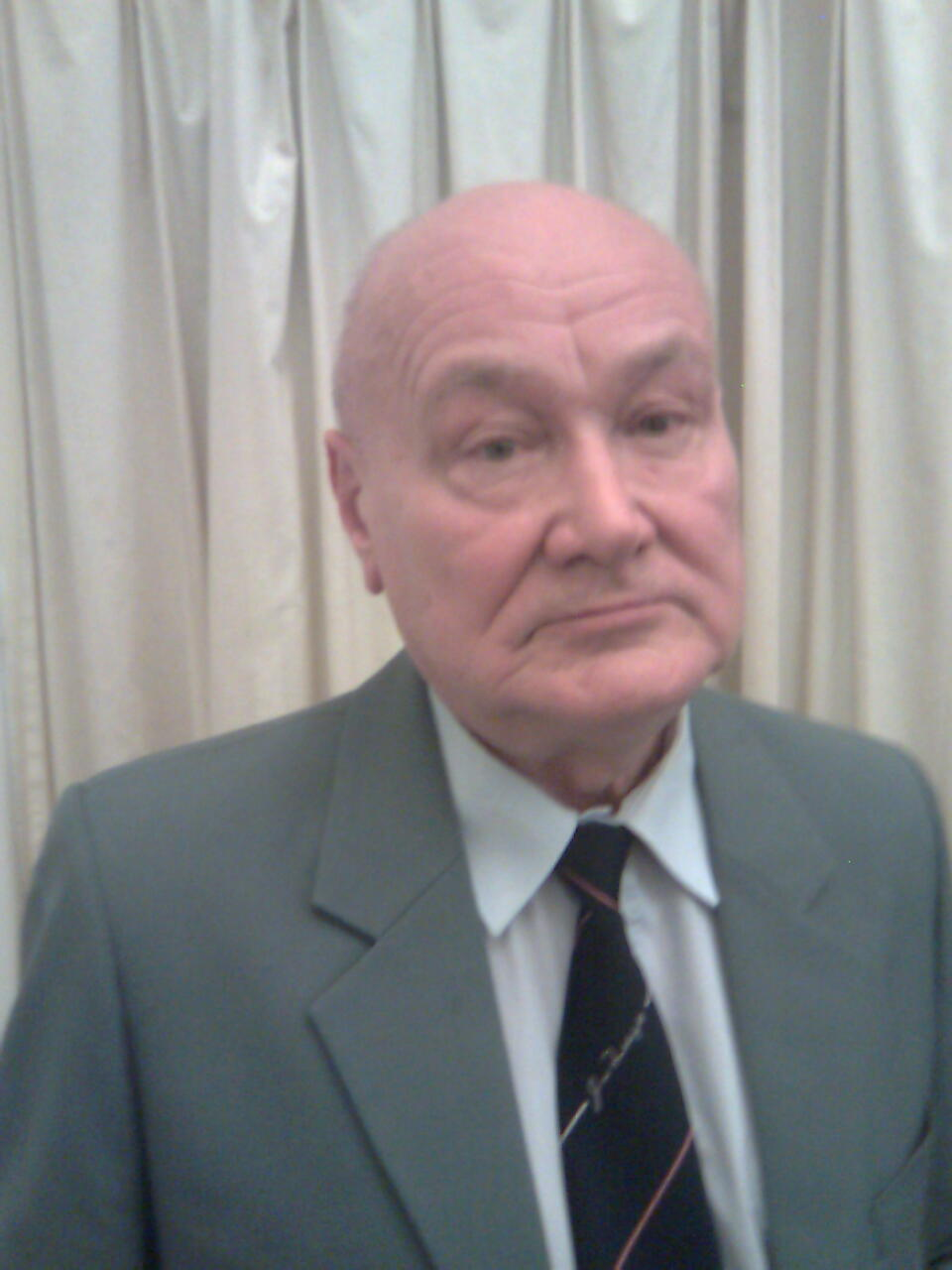
Adolf Opel

Adolf Opel (12 June 1935, in Vienna – 15 July 2018, in Vienna) was an Austrian writer, filmmaker, and editor. He edited publications of the writings of Adolf Loos, Elsie Altmann-Loos, Else Feldmann, and Lina Loos. He also made films about Paul Celan, Elisabeth Bergner, Viktor Frankl, Hans Weigel, Franz Theodor Csokor, and H. C. Artmann. He was the recipient of the Theodor Körner Prize in 1981, 1987, and 1993.

He has spent several years studying in the USA, Mexico, Brazil, Argentina and Paraguay, as well as in many European countries and in the Far and Middle East. He traveled through Austria with Thornton Wilder in 1959.

In the mid-1960s, Opel was the life partner of Ingeborg Bachmann, which is relevant to her novel fragment "Der Fall Franza" and the poem "Böhmen liegt am Meer". Together with her, he traveled to Prague, Greece, Egypt and Sudan.
