= Philipp Hochmair =

Austrian actor

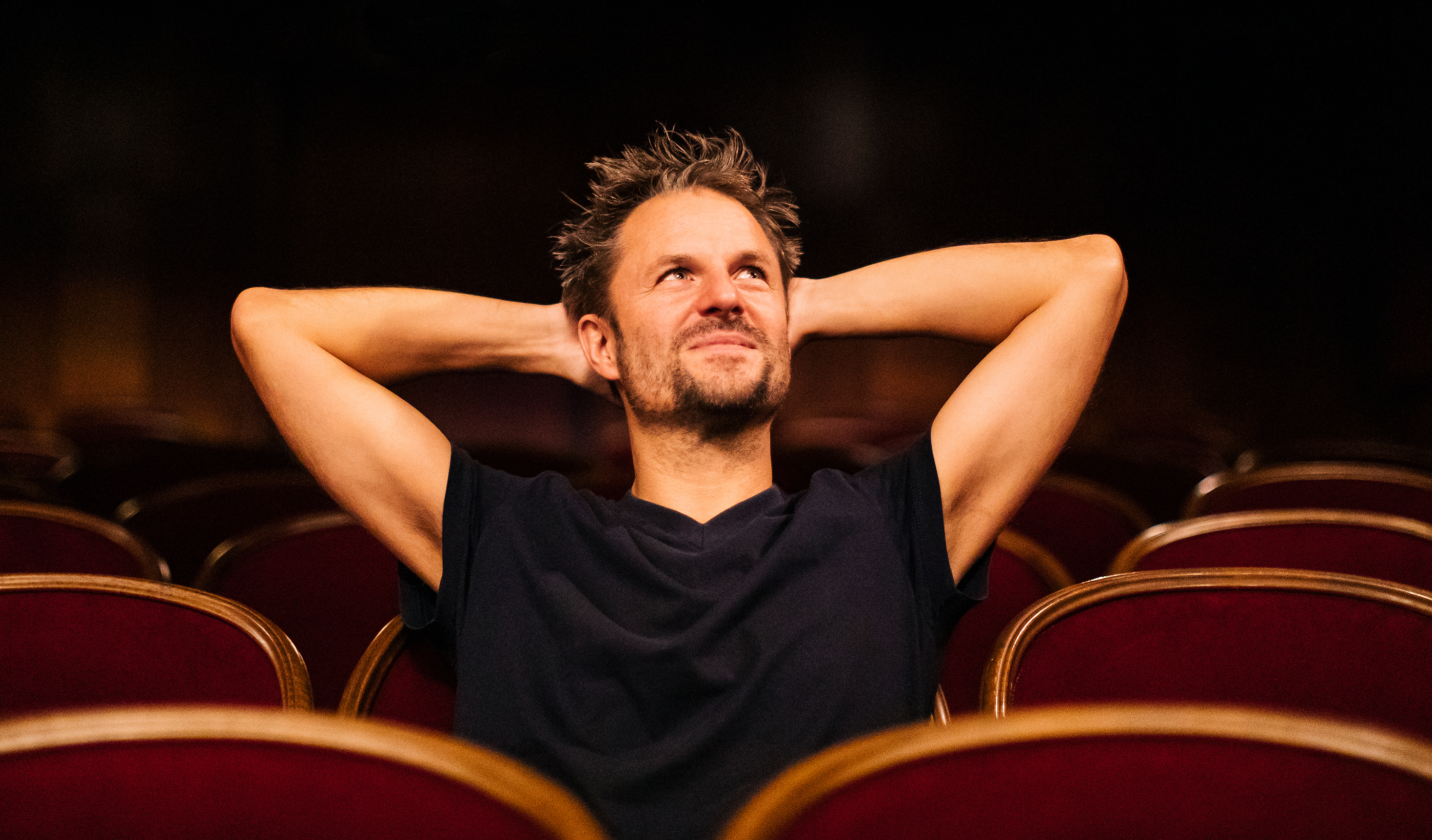
- Hochmair in 2021
- Born: October 16, 1973 (age 53); Vienna, Austria
- Occupation: actor
- Awards: Diagonale (2017); Romy (2019, 2022, 2025); Grimme-Preis (2023); Film Festival Kitzbühel (2024); Austrian Music Theater Prize (2024)
- Website: philipphochmair.com

Philipp Hochmair (German pronunciation: [ˈfɪǀɪp ˈhoːxmɑɪɐ]; born 16 October 1973) is an Austrian theater, film and television actor.

== Early life ==
Hochmair grew up in Vienna where he discovered his passion for literature, film and theater. He studied acting at the Max Reinhardt Seminar in Vienna in the master class of Klaus Maria Brandauer and at the Conservatoire National Supérieur d'Art Dramatique in Paris.

== Career ==
=== Theater ===
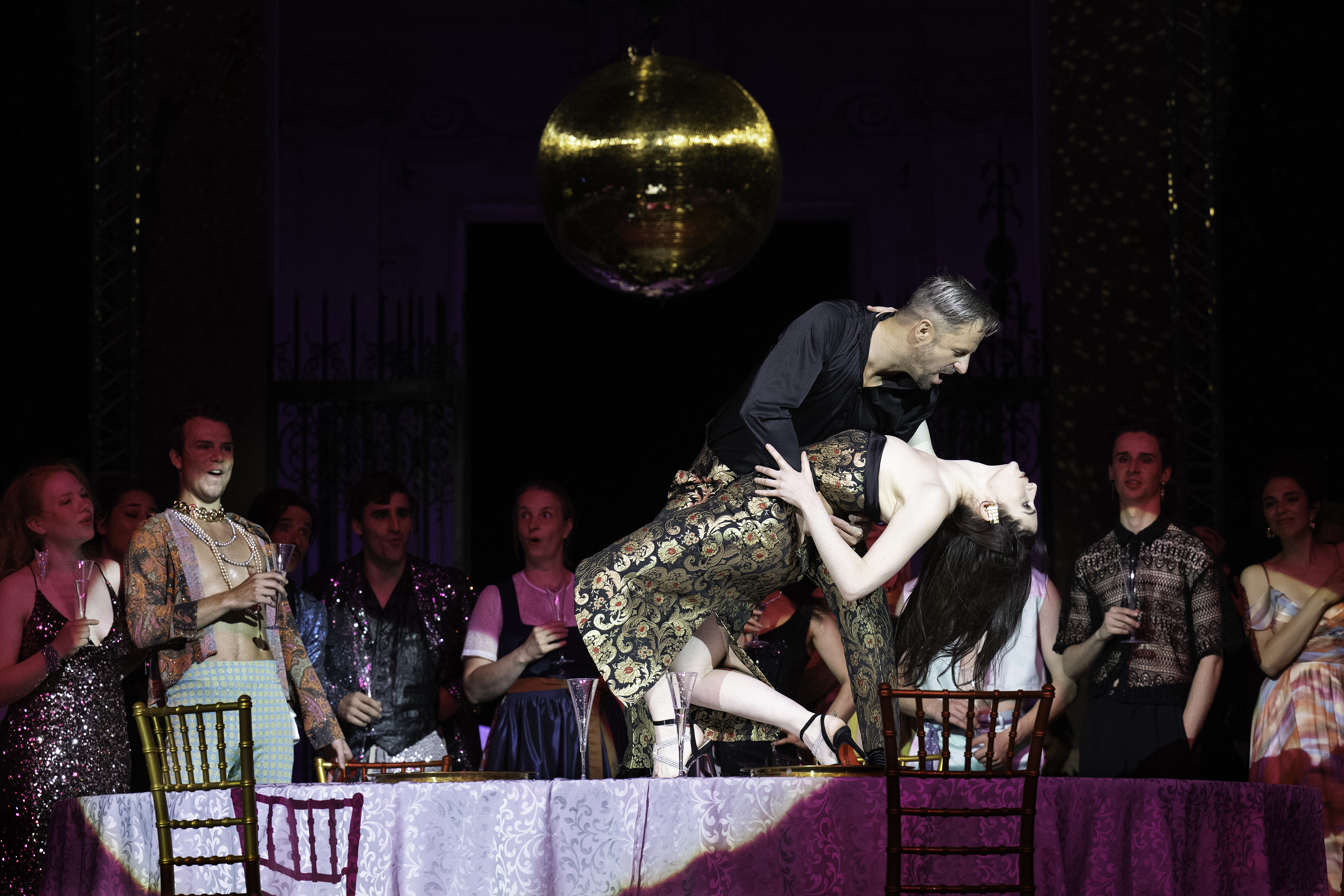
Salzburg Festival 2024, Jedermann, Philipp Hochmair and Deleila Piasko

From 2003 to 2009 Hochmair was engaged at the Viennese Burgtheater (admitted in the gallery of honor). When he left the Burgtheater in 2009, he worked at the Thalia Theater in Hamburg until 2016. Apart from this, he had engagements at the Schauspielhaus Hamburg, Staatstheater Hannover, Volksbühne Berlin and at the Zürich Schauspielhaus.

Since summer 2024, Hochmair took on the role of “Everyman“ in the play of a rich man´s death by Hugo von Hofmannstahl (Hugo von Hofmannsthal, Jedermann), at the Salzburg Festival under the direction of Robert Carsen.

=== Movies and TV ===
He has appeared in Austrian and German movies, TV-films and television series, including Die Manns – ein Jahrhundertroman (directed by Heinrich Breloer: 30th International Emmy Awards), The Shine of the Day (by Tizza Covi and Rainer Frimmel), Die Auslöschung (director: Nicholas Leytner), Tomcat (by Händl Klaus) and Animals (directed by Greg Zglinksi).

Candelaria - Ein kubanischer Sommer (2017) is one of his first international productions. Directed by Jhonny Hendrix Hinestroza, it was shot in Cuba in 2016.

In the series Vorstadtweiber (2015-2022), he plays a corrupt and cynical homosexual politician, who loses his mind and becomes a murderer.

In the third season of Charité (German-Netflix-Production, 2020), Hochmair stars as Professor Otto Prokop, an Austrian forensic pathologist who was internationally recognized for his influence on forensic medicine and research policy during the German Democratic Republic era.

Blind ermittelt (since 2018) centers on Hochmair's character Alexander Haller, a blind ex-police investigator.

In the Netflix-Series Freud (2019), he plays an evil count obsessed by dark powers.

Die Wannseekonferenz (2022, directed by Matti Geschonneck) is a multi-award winning German TV docudrama: On January 20, 1942, leading representatives of the Nazi regime meet at Wannsee in Berlin at the invitation of Reinhard Heydrich (played by Hochmair). The meeting will go down in history as the infamous Wannsee Conference. The sole topic of discussion is the so-called "Final Solution of the Jewish Question" by the National Socialists: the organization of the systematic mass murder of the Jews of Europe by the millions.

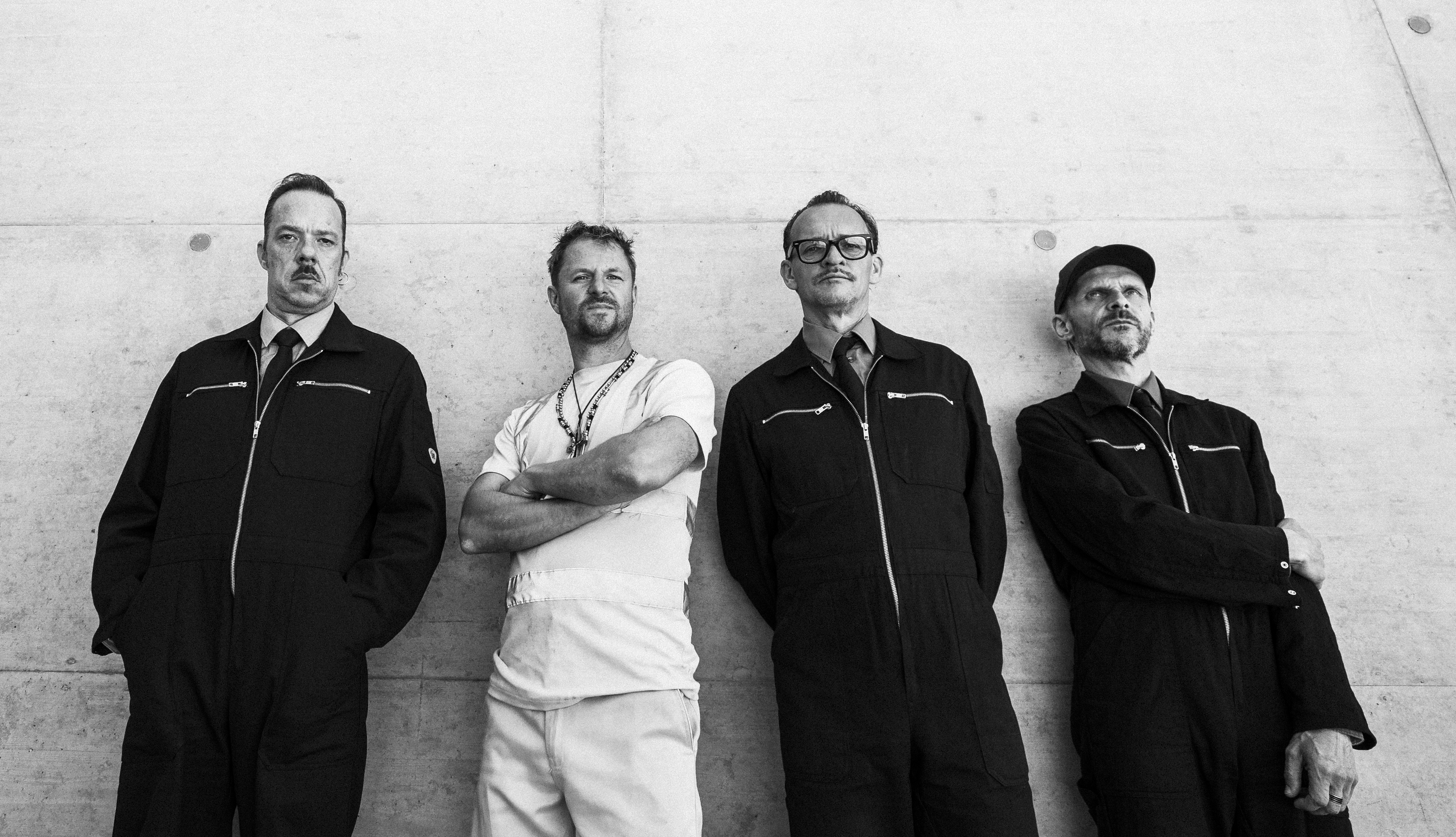
Philipp Hochmair & Die Elektrohand Gottes

=== Other projects ===
Hochmair has performed his solo projects Werther! (by Goethe), The Trial and America, (both by Franz Kafka).

Jedermann Reloaded is Hochmair's rock interpretation of Hugo von Hofmannsthal's original play Jedermann, which he performs with his band Die Elektrohand Gottes on stage. With his band, he has also set ballads by Friedrich Schiller to music in a rock style (Schiller Balladen Rave) and in The Bachelors by Adalbert Stifter.

In November 2018, Hochmair and his band performed Jedermann Reloaded at the Viennese St. Stephen's Cathedral. All proceeds of this sold-out charity event went to a South African AIDS hospice.

== Theater (selection) ==
Burgtheater Vienna

- 2003: The Works (Das Werk) by Elfriede Jelinek – Peter; directed by Nicolas Stemann
- 2004: Bérénice de Molière by Igor Bauersima – Jean Racine; directed by Igor Bauersima
- 2005: Babel by Elfriede Jelinek; directed by Nicolas Stemann
- 2005: Underground Blues (Untertagblues) by Peter Handke – A wild man; directed by Friederike Heller
- 2006: Torquato Tasso by Johann Wolfgang von Goethe – Torquato Tasso, court poets; directed by Stephan Kimmig
- 2006: They Are Dying Out (Die Unvernünftigen sterben aus) by Peter Handke – Hermann Quitt; directed by Friederike Heller
- 2007: The Trial (Der Prozess) by Franz Kafka – Joseph K.; directed by Andrea Gerk and Philipp Hochmair
- 2007: The Lost (Spuren der Verirrten) by Peter Handke; directed by Friederike Heller
- 2007: The Brothers Karamazov by Fyodor Dostoevsky; directed by Nicolas Stemann
- 2008: Doctor Faustus – my love is a fever based on Thomas Mann; directed by Friederike Heller

Deutsches Theater Berlin

- 2007: Don Carlos by Friedrich Schiller – Don Carlos; directed by Nicolas Stemann
- 2008: The Trial (Der Prozess) by Franz Kafka – Joseph K.; takeover of the production from Burgtheater Vienna, directed by Andrea Gerk and Philipp Hochmair

Schauspielhaus Zürich

- 2003: The Son (Sonen) by Jon Fosse – Son; directed by Elias Perrig

Staatstheater Hannover

- 2001: Oresteia by Aeschylus – Orestes; directed by Nicolas Stemann
- 2002: Hamlet by William Shakespeare – Hamlet; directed by Nicolas Stemann

Thalia Theater Hamburg

- 2008: The Robbers (Die Räuber) by Friedrich Schiller – Franz Moor; Coproduction with the Salzburg Festival 2008, directed by Nicolas Stemann
- 2009: Amerika based on Franz Kafka – Karl Rossmann; directed by Bastian Kraft
- 2009: Nathan the Wise (Nathan der Weise) by Gotthold Ephraim Lessing – Young Templar; directed by Nicolas Stemann
- 2010: Woyzeck Musical by Tom Waits based on Georg Büchner – Captain; directed by Jette Steckel
- 2010: Puss in Boots (Der gestiefelte Kater) based on the Brothers Grimm – Cat; directed by Wolf-Dietrich Sprenger
- 2011: Faust I and II by Johann Wolfgang von Goethe – Mephisto; Coproduction with the Salzburg Festival 2011: directed by Nicolas Stemann
- 2012: The Broken Jug (Der zerbrochene Krug) by Heinrich von Kleist – The judge Adam; directed by Bastian Kraft
- 2013: Jedermann by Hugo von Hofmannsthal; concert performance, Salzburg Festival, premiere 2013, directed by Bastian Kraft

Hamburger Kammerspiele

- 1998: Cleansed by Sarah Kane – Carl; directed by Peter Zadek

Salzburg Festival

- 2008: The Robbers (Die Räuber) by Friedrich Schiller – Franz Moor; Coproduction of the Thalia Theater Hamburg with the Salzburg Festival 2008, directed by Nicolas Stemann
- 2011: Faust I and II by Johann Wolfgang von Goethe – Mephisto; Coproduction of the Thalia Theater Hamburg with the Salzburg Festival 2011, directed by Nicolas Stemann
- 2018: Jedermann by Hugo von Hofmannsthal – Jedermann; Salzburg Festival, directed by Michael Sturminger (Hochmair played the Jedermann for the sick Tobias Moretti.)
- Since 2024: Jedermann by Hugo von Hofmannsthal – Jedermann; Salzburg Festival, directed by Robert Carsen

Independent productions

- 1997: Werther! based on Johann Wolfgang von Goethe – Werther; directed by Nicolas Stemann
- 2011: Porno by Ela Angerer (book and direction)
- 2023: The Bachelors by Adalbert Stifter

== Selected filmography ==
=== Film ===
- 1996: Lucie Aubrac by Claude Berri: German soldier
- 2000: The Experiment by Oliver Hirschbiegel: Lars
- 2005: Winter Journey by Hans Steinbichler: Xaver Brenninger
- 2010: Day and Night by Sabine Derflinger: Mario
- 2011: The Fatherless by Marie Kreutzer: Niki
- 2012: The Shine of the Day by Tizza Covi and Rainer Frimmel: Philipp Hochmair
- 2013: Talea by Katharina Mückstein: Stefan
- 2016: Tomcat by Klaus Händl: Andreas
- 2017: Animals by Greg Zglinski: Nick
- 2017: Candelaria by Jhonny Hendrix Hinestroza: El Carpintero
- 2019: Glück gehabt by Peter Payer: Artur
- 2019: All my loving by Edward Berger: Nico
- 2019: Ich war noch niemals in New York by Philipp Stölzl: Doctor
- 2020: Das Glaszimmer by Christian Lerch: Feik
- 2024: Der Soldat Monika by Paul Poet: The other Monika

=== Television ===
- 1999-2022: Tatort: Bogdan / Jan Beckern / Peter Altmann / Paul Schemerl / Wolfgang / Schöller
- 1999: Bella Block: Blinde Liebe by Sherry Hormann
- 2000: The Manns - Novel of a Century by Heinrich Breloer: Golo Mann
- 2003: Doppelter Einsatz: Die Wahrheit stirbt zuletzt by Dror Zahavi: Hannes Jessen
- 2008: SOKO Donau: Nachts kaum Abkühlung by Erwin Keusch: Fipsi Galen
- 2012: The Extinction by Nikolaus Leytner: Theo
- 2013: Ein starkes Team: Die Frau des Freundes by Maris Pfeiffer: Sebastian Hauser
- 2014: Madame Nobel by Urs Egger: Arthur von Suttner
- 2014: Clara Immerwahr by Harald Sicheritz: David Sachs
- 2015: Polizeiruf 110: Wendemanöver by Eoin Moore: Joseph Tischendorf
- 2015: Kleine große Stimme by Wolfgang Murnberger: Hans Reschke
- 2015-2022: Vorstadtweiber (TV Series): Dr. Joachim Schnitzler
- 2016: Solo für Weiss: Das verschwundene Mädchen by Thomas Berger: Matthias Matter
- 2017: Ein Sommer im Allgäu by Jeanette Wagner: Pirmin
- 2018: Deutschland 86 (TV Series) by Florian Cossen, Arne Feldhusen: Frank Winkelmann
- since 2018: Blind ermittelt by Jano Ben Chaabane, David Nawrath, Katharina Mückstein: Alexander Haller (15 episodes so far)
- 2019: SOKO Wien: Ritterschlag by Holger Gimpel: Joachim Kramp
- 2019: Ein Dorf wehrt sich by Gabriela Zerhaus: August Eigruber
- 2019: Maria Theresia (TV Series) by Robert Dornhelm: Baron von der Trenck
- 2020: Freud (TV Series) by Marvin Kren: Viktor von Szápáry
- 2021: Charité by Christine Hartmann: Otto Prokop
- 2022: The Conference by Matti Geschonneck: Reinhard Heydrich
- 2023: Partners in crime (Kleine Eheverbrechen) by Christian Werner: Gilles
- 2024: Helgoland 513 by Robert Schwentke: Silbermann
- 2024: Der Geier - Die Tote mit dem falschen Leben by Christian Werner: Lukas Geier
- 2025: Der Geier - Freund oder Feind by Florian Baxmeyer: Lukas Geier
- 2025: Mozart/Mozart by Clara Zoë My-Linh von Arnim: Joseph II.
- 2026: Glückspilze isst man nicht by Rainer Kaufmann: Hinnar Kotte

=== Documentary ===
- 2020: Philipp Hochmair - Eine Reise mit Jedermann by Bernadette Schugg, Philipp Hochmair
- 2021: Jedermann und ich by Katharina Pethke
- 2021: Jedermann auf Reisen by Wolfgang Tonninger
- 2023: Jedermann und Ich - Ein Porträt in 3 Kapiteln by Philipp Hochmair and Katharina Pethke
- 2024: Philipp Hochmair: Zwischen Himmel und Hölle by Hannes Michael Schalle
- 2026: Wien bei Nacht: Das wilde Leben nach 1945 by Alexandra Venier

== Literature ==
- Katharina von der Leyen, Philipp Hochmair: Hochmair, wo bist du?. Biograph. Brandstätter Verlag 2025

== Awards and nominations ==
In 2017, Hochmair won the Diagonale Festival Award in Graz for his performance in Tomcat.

In 2019, he won the Austrian Television Award ROMY for his role Alexander Haller, the blind ex-commissioner in Blind ermittelt.

In 2022, he won the Austrian Television Award ROMY for his role Reinhard Heydrich in The Conference.

In 2022, he was nominated in the category Best Actor for the German Television Award for The Conference.

In 2023, he won the Grimme-Preis for The Conference.

In 2024 he won the Retrospective and Honorary Award at the Film Festival Kitzbühel.

In 2024 he won the Cross Over Award at the Austrian Music Theater Award (Österreichischer Musiktheaterpreis).

In 2025, he won the Austrian Television Award ROMY for Jedermann at the Salzburg Festival.

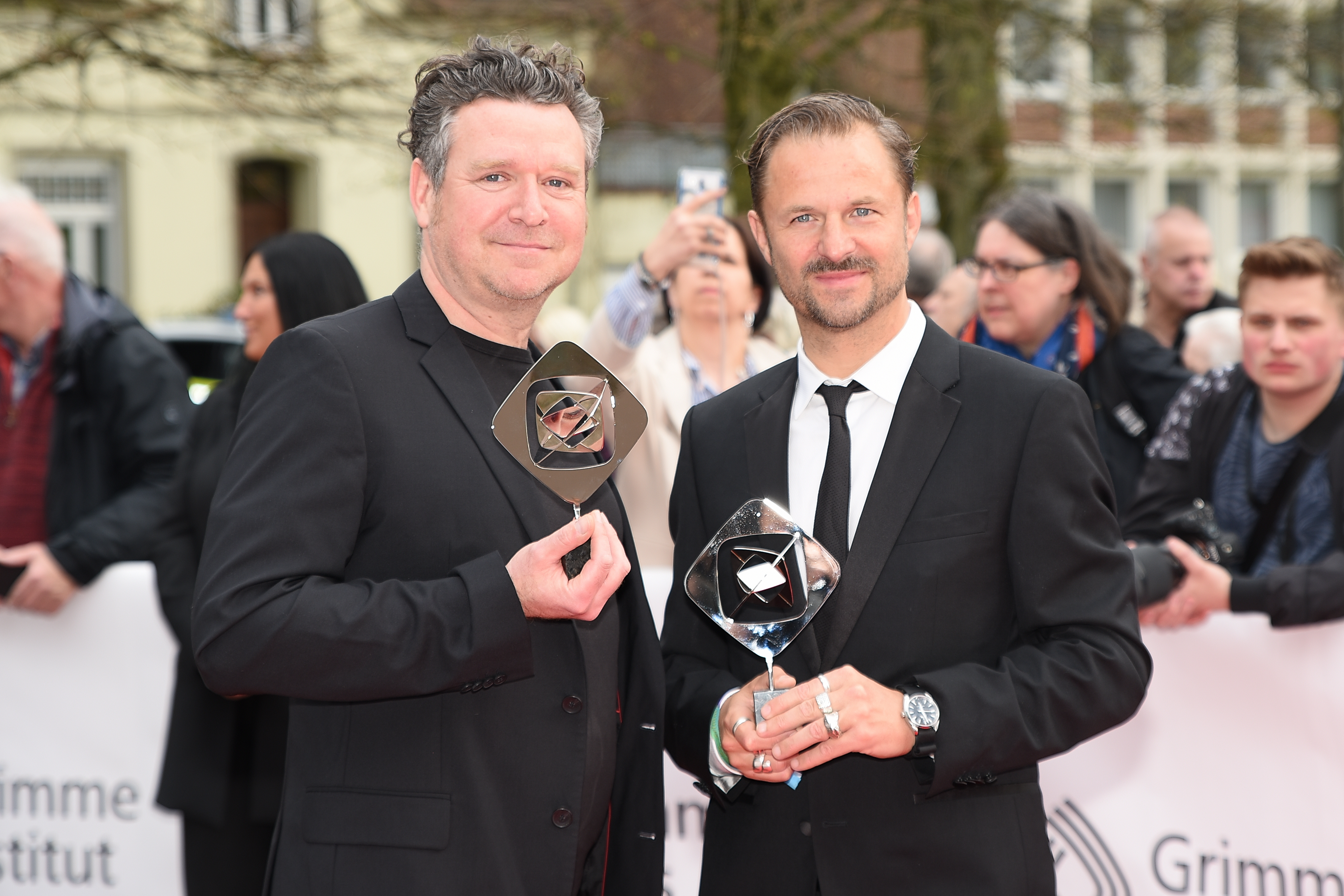
Grimme-Preis 2023, Magnus Vattrodt, Philipp Hochmair
