= L'Animale =

2018 film by Katharina Mückstein

- Theatrical release poster
- Directed by: Katharina Mückstein
- Screenplay by: Katharina Mückstein
- Produced by: Nikolaus Geyrhalter; Markus Glaser; Michael Kitzberger; Flavio Marchetti; Katharina Mückstein; Michael Schindegger; Natalie Schwager; Wolfgang Widerhofer
- Starring: Sophie Stockinger; Kathrin Resetarits; Dominik Warta; Julia Franz Richter; Jack Hofer
- Cinematography: Michael Schindegger
- Edited by: Natalie Schwager
- Music by: Bernhard Fleischmann
- Production companies: Nikolaus Geyrhalter Filmproduktion; La Banda Film
- Distributed by: Polyfilm Verleih
- Release dates: 18 February 2018 (Berlin Film Festival); 16 March 2018 (Austria)
- Running time: 100 minutes
- Country: Austria
- Language: German

L'Animale is a 2018 Austrian coming-of-age drama film written and directed by Katharina Mückstein, starring Sophie Stockinger. The film made its world premiere at the 68th Berlin Film Festival in the Panorama section on 18 February 2018. It was released in theaters in Austria by Polyfilm Verleih on 16 March 2018. The film received six nominations at the 2019 Austrian Film Award, including Best Film and Best Actress.

== Plot ==
In rural Austria, 18-year-old Mati is a tomboy who struggles with gender identity and sexuality, only hangs out with boys and is a member of a motocross gang that causes trouble in the region. Mati's best friend, Sebastian, suddenly wants to be more than a friend, at the same time that Mati meets Carla, a self-confident girl who is completely different from her. Meanwhile, Mati's parents struggle with a long-kept secret.

== Cast ==
- Sophie Stockinger as Mati
- Kathrin Resetarits as Mutter
- Dominik Warta as Vater
- Julia Franz Richter as Carla
- Jack Hofer as Sebastian
- Dominic Marcus Singer as Kogler
- Simon Morzé as Mark
- Stefan Pohl as Felix

== Production ==
The film was co-produced by the Nikolaus Geyrhalter Filmproduktion and La Banda Film. Director Katharina Mückstein also wrote the screenplay for the film. The score was composed by Bernhard Fleischmann.

The title, L'Animale, comes from the 1985 Italian song of the same name performed by Franco Battiato, which is featured in the film.

Director Katharina Mückstein wrote the role of Mati especially for Sophie Stockinger. L'Animale marks their second collaboration following the 2013 film Talea. Mückstein said she wanted to write another screenplay featuring Stockinger. "I always knew that L'Animale would be about a young girl and I also wanted to talk about the conflict we face between rationality and passion. I knew that it would be a feminist film that dealt with gender and gender identity, because I studied gender before going to film school. I worked on the screenplay for two years, and the story underwent a lot of changes before reaching its final form".

Stockinger had to learn to ride a bike for the motocross scenes.

Mückstein said in a director's statement that L'Animale is her personal answer to the question of how free we, as modern people, really are. She said: "We want to please and be respected. We are sensitive and are often afraid. However, authenticity requires confrontation, emancipation demands effort, progress needs courage. Individual resistance, the courage to liberate one's identity and sexuality… is the greatest revolutionary potential in our times."

=== Filming ===
Filming began in Vienna, Austria on 8 July 2016 and wrapped on 23 September 2016.

The shooting locations in Lower Austria, where the shoot took place in September 2016, included a farm in Gablitz and a house in Pressbaum, both communities bordering the community of Purkersdorf. In Pressbaum, a modern house that was almost completely built was chosen as Matis' parents' house. Regarding the choice of locations in Lower Austria, Mückstein explained: "Places also radiate something between the lines, you can tell whether it's near a city or very far away. Here it was important to tell the story of the outskirts of the commuter belt, where young people have an idea of the city but don't regularly go there where there are many new influences."

== Release ==
The first trailer for the film was unveiled on 5 February 2018. The film made its world premiere at the 68th Berlin Film Festival on 18 February 2018 in the Panorama section, and it also competed for Teddy Award, a separate section from the festival. It was released in theaters in Austria by Polyfilm Verleih on 16 March 2018. The film was screened at AFI Fest 2018 as part of the New Auteurs section.

== Reception ==
Rotten Tomatoes gives the film a score of 88% based on 8 reviews, with a weighted average of 7/10.

== Awards and nominations ==
Year	Award / Festival	Category	Recipient(s)	Result	Ref.
2018	AFI Fest	Audience Award - New Auteurs	Katharina Mückstein	Nominated	
2018	Berlin International Film Festival	Teddy - Best LGBT Feature Film	Katharina Mückstein	Nominated	
2018	Berlin International Film Festival	Panorama Audience Award - Fiction Film	Katharina Mückstein	Nominated	
2018	Cinema Jove - Valencia International Film Festival	Best Film	Katharina Mückstein	Nominated	
2018	Cinema Jove - Valencia International Film Festival	CIMA Award - Best Film Directed by a Woman	Katharina Mückstein	Won	
2018	Diagonale Festival of Austrian Film	Best Ensemble Cast	Sophie Stockinger, Kathrin Resetarits, Dominik Warta, Julia Franz Richter, Jack Hofer, Dominic Marcus Singer, Simon Morzé, Stefan Pohl	Won	
2018	Jerusalem Film Festival	FIPRESCI Prize - International First Film	Katharina Mückstein	Nominated	
2018	Seoul International Women's Film Festival	Best Film	Katharina Mückstein	Won	
2018	Mezipatra Queer Film Festival	Grand Jury Prize - Feature Film Competition	Katharina Mückstein	Nominated	
2018	Les Arcs Film Festival	Best Narrative Feature	Katharina Mückstein	Nominated	
2018	Les Arcs Film Festival	Best Original Score	Bernhard Fleischmann	Won	
2018	Queer Film Festival Munich	Best Film	Katharina Mückstein	Nominated	
2018	Zurich Film Festival	Golden Eye - Best Film in Focus Switzerland, Germany, Austria	Katharina Mückstein	Won	
2019	Austrian Film Award	Best Feature Film	Katharina Mückstein	Nominated	
2019	Austrian Film Award	Best Actress	Sophie Stockinger	Nominated	
2019	Austrian Film Award	Best Cinematography	Michael Schindegger	Nominated	
2019	Austrian Film Award	Best Film Editing	Natalie Schwager	Nominated	
2019	Austrian Film Award	Best Sound Editing	Hjalti Bager-Jonathansson, Karim Weth, Alexander Koller	Nominated	
2019	Austrian Film Award	Best Score	Bernhard Fleischmann	Won	
2019	Palm Springs International Film Festival	New Voices/New Visions Grand Jury Prize	Katharina Mückstein	Nominated	
2019	Romy Gala	Best Upcoming Actress	Sophie Stockinger	Won	
2020	Prix Europa	TV Fiction	Katharina Mückstein	Nominated	
