= Josef Schaupper =

Austrian alpine skier

Personal information
- Nationality: Austrian
- Born: 3 August 1963
- Died: 11 November 2000 (aged 37) Kitzsteinhorn, Austria
- Years active: 1987 – 1999

Sport
- Country: Austria
- Sport: alpine skiing
Medal record
Representing Austria
Men's Alpine skiing
Winter Deaflympics
Event / 1st / 2nd / 3rd; Deaflympics / 1 / 5 / 1
Gold medal – first place	Oslo 1987	Parallel slalom
Silver medal – second place	Oslo 1987	Slalom
Silver medal – second place	Ylläs 1995	Giant slalom
Silver medal – second place	Ylläs 1995	Super-G
Silver medal – second place	Davos 1999	Slalom
Silver medal – second place	Davos 1999	Super-G
Bronze medal – third place	Oslo 1987	Downhill

Josef Schaupper (3 August 1963 – 11 November 2000) was an Austrian deaf alpine skier. He represented Austria at the Deaflympics in 1987, 1995 and 1999, winning 7 medals including a gold medal. He died in the Kaprun funicular railway fire on 11 November 2000, along with his fellow deaf skiers.

== Career ==
Schaupper made his debut at the 1987 Winter Deaflympics and competed on two further occasions. In his maiden appearance, he won 3 medals: gold medal in parallel slalom, silver medal in slalom and bronze medal in downhill.

After missing the 1991 Winter Deaflympics, he took part in the 1995 Winter Deaflympics, winning silver medals in the men's giant slalom and super giant events. In the 1999 Winter Deaflympics, he again won silver medals in the men's slalom and super giant events.

== Death ==
Schaupper and his friends Sandra Mayr, Karl Hutegger and Stephan Mohr, who were also deaf skiers, were trapped and killed in a fire in an ascending train in the tunnel of the Gletscherbahn Kaprun 2 in Kaprun. The disaster killed 155 people. A memorial to Josef Schaupper was erected in 2011 in Goldegg.
