= Anna Kohler =

German-American theater actress and translator

Anna Kohler (alternative spellings: Anna Köhler or Anna Koehler) is a German-American theater actress, director and translator. She is currently (since September 2010) a Senior Lecturer in Theater Arts at the Massachusetts Institute of Technology.

== Early life ==
She was born in Giessen, Germany, and after graduating from high school (Gymnasium) in 1976, she trained at the Conservatory for Art and Drama, the Mozarteum, in Salzburg (Austria) and graduated at the Université de Paris VIII, Vincennes. A collaboration with Stuart Sherman (artist) brought her to New York in 1982.

== Career ==
As a performer, Köhler has worked with John Jesurun, Richard Foreman, Jeff Weiss, Fiona Templeton and Georg Osterman. Her night club performances with Steve Buscemi and Mark Boone Junior were legendary. Among others, she appeared in Werner Herzog's Variete at the Hebbel Theater in Berlin. Anna Köhler is an Associate Member of the Wooster Group; she was full time member of the group from 1983 to 1993. In 2003, she reprised her role as Natalya in the Wooster Group's revival of Brace Up!; her performance was praised in The New Yorker as the "emotional center" of the show. More recently, she appeared in Richard Maxwell's "Ode to the Man Who Kneels". Her film work includes Hal Hartley's The Book of Life, Bruno de Almeida's On the Run with Michael Imperioli, and uncredited appearances in Jonathan Demme's Philadelphia, as well as "Sex and the City" (Episode 6: Secret Sex.)

As a translator, Köhler has translated works from English to German as well as from German to English; her translation of Rene Pollesch's "24 Stunden sind kein Tag" (24 hours are not a day) has been published in Theater (Duke University Press), and John Jesurun's "Philoctetes" in Theater der Zeit (2005). She also translated Norway.today by the Swiss playwright Igor Bauersima (available through the Goethe Institut Theater Library) into English, and several plays by Richard Foreman and Richard Maxwell into German.
