= Nicolas Stemann =

German theatre director (born 1968)

- Born: 1968 (age 57–58); Hamburg, Germany

Nicolas Stemann (born 1968 in Hamburg, West Germany) is a German theatre director. He is best known for directing the 2002 stage production of Hamlet at Schauspiel Hannover, a theatre in Hanover.

== Career ==
Stemann studied German literature and philosophy at the University of Hamburg, and drama, theatre and directing at the Max Reinhardt Seminar in Vienna. Later he also studied at the theatre academy in Hamburg with Jürgen Flimm and Christof Nel. He has been active in his chosen field of profession since 1995. The first time he received national attention was through the production of his Trilogy of Terror in 1997 at Kampnagel in Hamburg and Hoftheater Gostner in Nuremberg (Antigone by Sophocles, The Seagull by Anton Chekhov, Leonce and Lena by Georg Büchner). Furthermore, Stemann production of Werther by Johann Wolfgang von Goethe in Nuremberg (1997), featuring Philipp Hochmair, is played at present in numerous national and international theatres.

In 2002 Nicolas Stemann was invited to the Berlin Theatertreffen for the first time, for his part in the production of Hamlet. A year earlier, in 2001, this production had already been invited by the Frankfurt-oriented TAT and has been staged at Experimenta 7.

Stemanns international recognition was mainly due to his theatrical productions based on texts by Elfriede Jelinek. His production The Work which premiered at the Academy Theatre in Vienna, was invited to the Berlin Theatertreffen and international festivals in 2004. In 2007 Ulrike Maria Stuart was premiered at the Thalia Theatre in Hamburg, and subsequently invited for the Berlin Theatertreffen. Nicolas Stemann staged regularly at the Burgtheater in Vienna, the Deutsches Theater in Berlin and the Thalia Theater in Hamburg. He regularly works with stage designer Katrin Nottrodt, costume designer Esther Bialas, multimedia artist Claudia Lehmann and dramaturg Bernd Stegemann.

From the 2019/2020 season, he will be co-director of Schauspielhaus Zürich together with dramaturge Benjamin von Blomberg.

== List of productions ==
- Trilogy of Terror in 1997
- Möwe. Terrorspiel in 1998
- Zombie 45 - Am Baß Adolf Hitler in 1998
- Leonce und Lena in 1999
- Hamlet in 2001
- Das Werk in 2003
- Ulrike Maria Stuart in 2007
