= Kaprun disaster =

2000 funicular train fire in Austria

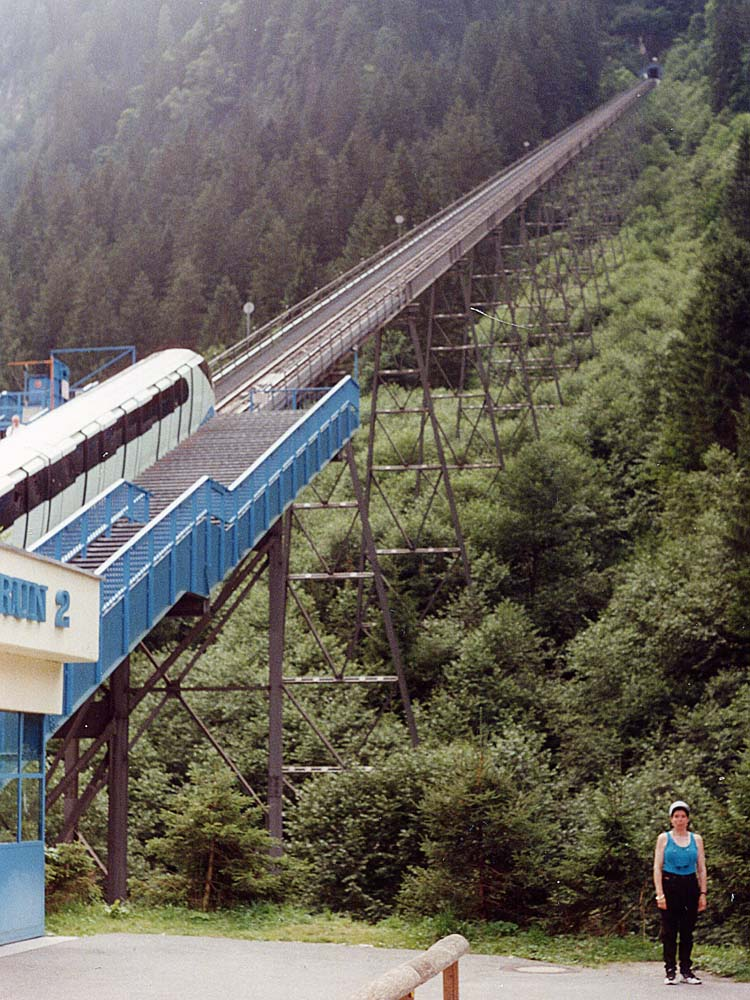
- The Gletscherbahn Kaprun 2 funicular train waiting at the lower valley station a few weeks before the disaster. The train involved caught fire shortly after leaving the valley station and entered the tunnel where it came to a halt. The tunnel entrance is visible in the background.
- Date: November 11, 2000
- Time: shortly after 9:00 am (CET)
- Venue: Kitzsteinhorn
- Location: Kaprun, Austria; 47°13′32.26″N 12°43′14.67″E
- Type: Fire
- Cause: Faulty fan heater, unsafe upgrades
- Deaths: 155 (Note: 150 on the ascending train, 2 on the descending train, 3 in the mountain station)
- Charges: Criminal negligence (acquitted)

On 11 November 2000, a fire broke out on a train of the Gletscherbahn Kaprun 2 funicular in Kaprun, Austria. The burning car came to a stop in a tunnel that funneled smoke and flames upward, killing 155 people. Most of the victims were skiers on their way to the Kitzsteinhorn glacier. The incident remains the deadliest rail disaster in Austrian history. Investigation found that the fire was caused by atomized oil from a faulty hydraulic pipe being sucked into and ignited by a nearby fan heater.

== Train ==
The Gletscherbahn Kaprun 2 funicular railway, which ran from Kaprun to the Kitzsteinhorn, opened in 1974 and had been modernized in 1993. It had an unusual track gauge of 946 mm (3 ft 1 1/4 in), and a length of 3,900 metres (12,800 ft), 3,300 metres (10,800 ft) of which was inside a tunnel. The train ascended and descended the 30 degree slope at 25 km/h (16 mph). Two trains ran simultaneously on a single track, with a section halfway allowing them to pass each other. The tunnel terminated at the main reception centre, the Alpincenter, where a motorized winch drove the trains. It was a low-voltage electrical system, with 160-litre hydraulic tanks on board for the brakes and doors, and a conductor. Each train had four passenger compartments giving a total capacity of 180 passengers, and a conductor's cab at each end; the conductor switched end as the train travelled up and down.

== Fire ==
On 11 November 2000 shortly after 9 am, 161 passengers and one conductor boarded the funicular train for the slopes. At 9:02 am the train set off. The train unexpectedly halted eight minutes later, 600 metres (2,000 ft) into the tunnel and 1,132 metres (3,714 ft) away from the lower station. Some minutes later the train assistant reported a fire to the control centre, and failed in an attempt to open the hydraulically operated doors, then lost contact with the control centre because the fire had burned through a 16kV power cable running alongside the track, causing a power blackout throughout the ski resort.

The passengers attempted to break the shatter-resistant acrylic windows. Twelve people from the rear of the train broke a window with a ski pole and, advised by an escapee who had been a volunteer fire fighter, escaped downwards past the fire and below the smoke.

Many of the trapped occupants lost consciousness due to toxic fumes. With the help of the electric system the train assistant managed to unlock the doors, allowing them to be manually forced open. The conscious passengers fled up the tunnel away from the fire. The tunnel acted as a blast furnace, sucking oxygen in from below and sending poisonous fumes, heat and the fire itself upwards. The train assistant and all the passengers ascending on foot died by asphyxiation and were burned.

The train assistant and the sole passenger on the second train, which was descending in the same tunnel above the burning train, also died of smoke inhalation. The smoke rose into the Alpincenter 2,500 m (8,200 ft) above. Two fleeing workers in the Alpincenter alerted employees and customers and escaped via an emergency exit. They left the exit doors open, which contributed to the chimney effect. All except four people escaped the centre as it filled with smoke. Firefighters reached the centre and revived one of the four; the other three were asphyxiated.

== Investigation ==
On 6 September 2001, the official inquiry was released, determining that the cause was the leak of a hydraulic pipe, atomizing oil ignited by a fan heater in the conductor's compartments which was not designed for use in a moving vehicle. Maybe a technical fault caused the unit to overheat, so that the atomized oil caught fire and ignited the flammable hydraulic fluid which melted the plastic fluid lines, further feeding the flames. The loss of hydraulic pressure applied the brakes (which are activated by fading hydraulic pressure) and disabled the hydraulically operated doors.

The cab heater similarly installed in the second train, on the console panel and near hydraulic lines.

The fan heater, manufactured by German firm Fakir, was a model intended for domestic use. It was installed by opening the heater, placing the rear section behind the console panel and the front section in front of the panel, and screwing it back together; a modification not approved by the manufacturer. In fact, the manual explicitly stated that it is not for use in transporation vehicles.

The structural flaws of the funicular trains, especially the lack of safety mechanisms, were found to have played a role. Fire extinguishers in each funicular unit were in the sealed attendants' compartments out of the passengers' reach. There were no smoke detectors. There was no cellphone reception within the tunnels, nor was there an intercom, meaning passengers had no way to contact the attendant or emergency services. Funicular expert Professor Josef Nejez said the designers had a perception that fire could not occur in a funicular cabin because no fire had occurred previously. The train complied with area safety codes, which did not address the systems installed on the train during its 1993 upgrade. The onboard electric power, easy flammable hydraulic oil, and fan heaters only intended for domestic use increased the likelihood of fire.

== Casualties and aftermath ==
At 1 pm on the day of the disaster, Salzburg governor Franz Schausberger held a press conference, announcing that no survivors were expected, except for those who had already escaped on their own. Three days of national mourning were to be held.

Five days later, on 16 November, recovery of all bodies was completed. On 30 January 2001, the wrecked train was retrieved from the tunnel.

Nationality	Deaths
Austria	92
Germany	37
Japan	10
United States	8
Slovenia	4
Netherlands	2
Czech Republic	1
United Kingdom	1
155

In addition to those who escaped from the Alpincenter and the person whom firefighters revived, 10 Germans and two Austrians escaped from the burning train by descending past the fire. Nineteen-year-old German freestyle skier Sandra Schmitt was one of the victims, at the time the reigning Women's Dual Moguls World Champion. Josef Schaupper, a seven-time Deaflympic medalist, was killed along with his fellow deaf skiers.

The funicular was not reopened and was replaced the next year by a gondola lift, a 24-person Gletscherjet 1 funitel. The track remained in place until 2011, when the track and the supporting structure below the tunnel were removed and the tunnel entrance was sealed shut.

=== Legal trial ===
The company operating the funicular, Kapruner Gletscherbahnen AG, denied responsibility and entered a legal dispute. A criminal trial started on 18 June 2002, involving 16 accused, including management of Kapruner Gletscherbahnen AG, Ministry of Transport officials and TÜV officials.

On 19 February 2004, Judge Manfred Seiss acquitted all suspects, including company officials, technicians, and government inspectors, saying there was insufficient evidence to find them guilty of criminal negligence. In September 2007, the public prosecutor found the manufacturer of the electric heater was not responsible.

A 2007 class action lawsuit by American attorney Ed Fagan failed, ending in the attorney's personal bankruptcy.

By 2008, a settlement with 451 claimants was reached, involving a sum of 13.9 million euros.

== Memorial ==
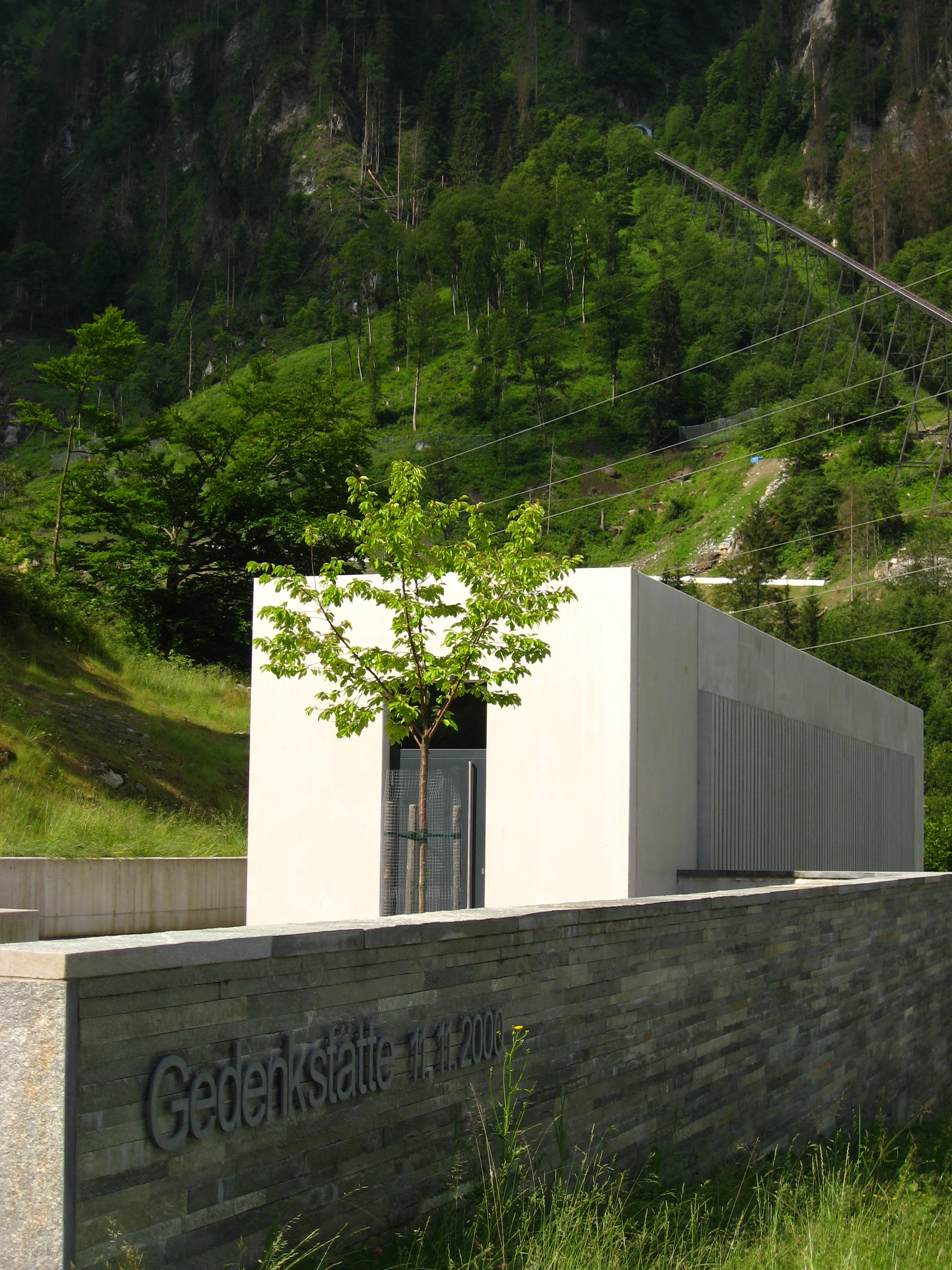
Memorial at the base station of the Kitzsteinhorn with the decommissioned Gletscherbahn 2 in the background.

On 11 November 2004, coinciding with the fourth anniversary of the disaster, a memorial was inaugurated. It features a stone structure with 155 glass columns, each representing one of the victims who died in the incident.
