= Achim Benning =

German actor and theatre director (1935–2024)

Achim Benning (20 January 1935 – 30 January 2024) was a German actor and theatre director. He was director of the Burgtheater in Vienna from 1976 to 1986, and director of the Schauspielhaus Zürich from 1989 to 1992. He died on 30 January 2024, at the age of 89.
