= Das Werk =

Das Werk (The Works, sometimes translated as The Plant) is a play by the Nobel Prize winning Austrian playwright and novelist Elfriede Jelinek.

== About ==
It premiered at the Akademietheater in Vienna on 11 April 2003, under the direction of Nicolas Stemann. Based on historical events, the play depicts the suffering of workers building a large power plant in the town of Kaprun. The Nazi government used slave labor for the project, then after the end of World War II, construction was completed using mostly foreign workers.
