= Talea (film) =

2013 film by Katharina Mückstein

- Theatrical release poster
- Directed by: Katharina Mückstein
- Written by: Selina Gnos; Katharina Mückstein
- Produced by: Flavio Marchetti; Katharina Mückstein; Michael Schindegger; Natalie Schwager
- Starring: Nina Proll; Sophie Stockinger
- Cinematography: Michael Schindegger
- Edited by: Natalie Schwager
- Music by: Veronika Eberhart; Wolfgang Möstl; Alessandro Mannarino
- Production company: La Banda Film
- Distributed by: Filmdelights
- Release dates: 23 January 2013 (Max Ophüls Festival); 13 September 2013 (Austria)
- Running time: 75 minutes
- Country: Austria
- Language: German

Talea is a 2013 Austrian coming-of-age drama film written and directed by Katharina Mückstein in her feature film directorial debut. The film made its world premiere at the Max Ophüls Festival on 23 January 2013, where it won the Prize of the Minister President of the State of Saarland for Best Director. It was released in theaters in Austria by Filmdelights on 13 September 2013. The film received two nominations for the Austrian Film Award: Best Director and Best Screenplay.

== Plot ==
It's Summertime in Austria and everyone is looking forward to their vacation in Italy. Everyone except 14-year-old Jasmin. She longs for her biological mother, Eva, who has just been released from prison. Jasmin runs away from her foster family and persuades Eva to go away with her. They grow closer, but when a man catches Eva's eye, the newly formed mother-daughter relationship is threatened.

== Cast ==
- Nina Proll as Eva
- Sophie Stockinger as Jasmin
- Lili Epply as Melanie
- Philipp Hochmair as Stefan
- Andrew Patton as Peter
- Eva Maria Gintsberg as Inge
- Rita Waszilovics as parole officer
- Alina Schaller as Elena

== Production ==
In an interview for Austrian newspaper Der Standard on 12 September 2013, director Katharina Mückstein said about the film's concept:

The desire to find out something about yourself is ingrained in all of us, no matter the environment in which we live. Yes, the foster family has something to offer on the surface, but if you have a blank space in your own identity, then there is pressure to get out and discover more about yourself. And in becoming a woman, the mother is an important figure against which you have to measure yourself. That was my personal point of reference, the question of what kind of woman can I be? A coming-of-age story but also a search for templates of womanhood.

== Reception ==
Jennie Kermode of Eye for Film wrote; "A slow, mature film from first time director Mückstein, Talea showcases a rare talent in Epply, who communicates all the anxieties of youth without ever losing audience sympathy. Even at her most irritable and demonstrable, Jasmin is clearly struggling with a level of distress that's hard to fathom, and her quiet glances give us hints of just how much she is refraining from complaining about," and "Astutely paced and thoughtful, Talea is a film that will appeal to teenagers and adults alike but which most will shrink from with thought of watching together."

Dan Fainaru of Screen Daily wrote; "As long as there is only Stockinger and Proll on the screen - and Michael Schindegger’s camera records their every expression closely - Katharina Muckstein’s direction works wonders, drawing from both her actresses subtly natural, intelligent and moving reactions. But it is enough for one more person to step into the frame for these admirable qualities to be lost, as if the intimacy established between Stockinger, Proll and the camera does not bear any additional presence. Neither the script nor the direction overcome this obstacle, nor do they manage to wrap up the plot in a satisfactory manner. Visually, however, there is nothing but praise for the careful choice of camera angles and for the meticulous framing. The pace is judicious, and just in case anyone wonders what the title is supposed to mean, ‘talea’ is a sprig intended to take roots in alien ground. Just like Jasmin."

Marina Pavido of Cinema Austriaco praised the film's score and wrote; "It is, then, bodies dancing lightly and finally free, as well as close-ups of suffering faces or teenage girls attending a swimming lesson that characterise Talea. And Katharina Mückstein’s camera knows perfectly well how to characterise them, making them, on screen, incredibly alive and pulsating."

== Awards and nominations ==
Year	Award / Festival	Category	Recipient(s)	Result
2013	Max Ophüls Festival	Prize of the Minister President of the State of Saarland - Best Director	Katharina Mückstein	Won
2013	Zurich Film Festival	Golden Eye - Best German Language Feature Film	Katharina Mückstein	Nominated
2013	Diagonale Festival of Austrian Film	Best Costume Design	Monika Buttinger	Won
2014	Austrian Film Award	Best Director	Katharina Mückstein	Nominated
2014	Austrian Film Award	Best Screenplay	Selina Gnos and Katharina Mückstein	Nominated
