= Feminism WTF =

2023 documentary film by Katharina Mückstein

- Theatrical release poster
- Directed by: Katharina Mückstein
- Written by: Katharina Mückstein; Ina Freudenschuss
- Produced by: Katharina Mückstein; Nikolaus Geyrhalter; Markus Glaser; Michael Kitzberger; Michael Schindegger; Natalie Schwager; Wolfgang Widerhofer
- Cinematography: Michael Schindegger
- Edited by: Natalie Schwager
- Music by: Tony Renaissance
- Production companies: La Banda Film; Nikolaus Geyrhalter Filmproduktion
- Distributed by: Stadtkino Filmverleih
- Release dates: 18 March 2023 (CPH:DOX); 31 March 2023 (Austria)
- Running time: 96 minutes
- Country: Austria
- Language: German

Feminism WTF is a 2023 Austrian documentary film about feminism and gender equality, written, produced and directed by Katharina Mückstein. The documentary had its world premiere at the CPH:DOX Festival in Copenhagen on 18 March 2023. It won the Audience Award for Most Popular Film at the 2023 Diagonale Festival of Austrian Film, and the Vienna Women's Prize for Best Director in 2023. The film was released theatrically in Austria by Stadtkino Filmverleih on 31 March 2023 and became the fourth most-watched Austrian film of 2023.

== Plot ==
Based on an idea by director Katharina Mückstein and Ina Freudenschuss, Feminism WTF is dedicated to the documentary examination of feminism and gender equality.

== Cast ==
- Maisha Auma
- Persson Perry Baumgartinger
- Astrid Biele Mefebue
- Nikita Dhawan
- Christoph May
- Franziska Schutzbach
- Sigrid Schmitz
- Rona Torenz
- Paula Villa Braslavsky
- Laura Wiesböck
- Emilene Wopana Mudimu

== Production ==
On 29 November 2018, it was announced that director Katharina Mückstein had received support from the Vienna Film Fund for a documentary entitled Feminism WTF. The "WTF" in the title stands for "What The Fuck".

The documentary was co-produced by La Banda Film and Nikolaus Geyrhalter Filmproduktion, with the support of Österreichisches Filminstitut, Filmfonds Wien, ORF Film/Fernsehabkommen and FISA - Filmstandort Austria. Filming took place in Vienna, Austria.

Mückstein originally wanted to shoot an English-language film with experts from the United States, Australia and the United Kingdom, and she had also started shooting with an Australian professor who travelled to Vienna especially for the documentary. But then the COVID-19 pandemic happened and travel became complicated, so the concept had to be rewritten. The contributors are now all from German-speaking countries, with a total of eleven people from different disciplines, from biology and linguistics to political science and educational science. Renowned experts such as sociologist Laura Wiesböck, gender scientist Maisha Auma, political scientist Nikita Dhawa, men's researcher Christoph May, sexologist Rona Torenz, and sociologist Paula Villa Braslavsky are interviewed in the documentary.

The documentary was shot in an empty concrete box in the 23rd district of Vienna and features queer performers dancing up and down the stairwell, men and women wrestling in pairs on mats on the floor, and interviewees placed in monochromatic ensembles in the room. The interviewees were asked in advance what they would wear to the interview and a separate room was designed for each person. "It was supposed to be a 'pop' film, one that's fun and shows that feminism can be the opposite of anti-pleasure and boring. That's actually one of the oldest anti-feminist arguments", Mückstein said of the film's aesthetics.

== Release ==
The first official trailer was released on 16 February 2023.

The film had its world premiere at the CPH:DOX in Copenhagen on 18 March 2023. It had its Austrian premiere at the Diagonale Festival of Austrian Film on 24 March 2023, and was released in theaters in Austria by Stadtkino Filmverleih on 31 March 2023.

== Reception ==
=== Critical response ===
FM4 included the film on its list of "32 films to look forward to in 2023".

Marina Pavido of Cinema Austriaco wrote: "Katharina Mückstein has researched everything down to the smallest detail and has once again shown herself to be particularly close to the world of women and how they have to fight every day to assert their rights and identity. Feminism WTF is not simply a documentary about feminism or the status of women within society. Feminism WTF is an extremely intelligent and necessary film, addressing everyone in view of a better future."

Hannah Michaeler of Kronen Zeitung wrote that "Mückstein drills through the major themes of the social movement: It's about violence, skin color and sexual identity, about men and gender as an outdated category. "Feminism WTF" is a survey of the present and a mission for the future, told in a way that is understandable for everyone. After the projection there was rightly a long jubilation."

Julia Schafferhofer of Kleine Zeitung wrote: "What The Fuck" serves as the call sign in Katharina Mückstein's trendy, polyphonic and quite angry feminist documentary. Many clever minds explain power and dependency relationships in a contemporary way, i.e. also from a trans-theoretical and post-colonial perspective. Sounds cerebral? Sometimes it is. Gender-fluid dances or the "Baby X" experiment loosen up the educational and aesthetically pleasing film by the filmmaker, screenwriter and activist, who got the #MeToo wave rolling in this country with a series of anonymous Instagram posts."

=== Box office ===
After 12 weeks in Austrian theaters following its release on 31 March 2023, Feminism WTF became the most-watched Austrian film of the weekend between 16–18 June 2023. As of September 2023, it has sold a total of 17.126 tickets in Austria, and it is the fourth most-watched Austrian film of 2023.

== Awards and nominations ==
| Year | Award / Festival | Category | Recipient(s) | Result | Ref. |
|---|---|---|---|---|---|
| 2023 | Diagonale Festival of Austrian Film | Audience Award for Most Popular Film | Katharina Mückstein | Won | |
| 2023 | Munich International Documentary Film Festival | VIKTOR DOK.deutsch – German-speaking Competition | Katharina Mückstein | Nominated | |
| 2023 | Vienna Women's Prize | Best Director | Katharina Mückstein | Won | |
