= Animals (2017 film) =

- Directed by: Greg Zglinski
- Starring: Birgit Minichmayr; Philipp Hochmair
- Release date: 13 February 2017 (BIFF)
- Running time: 1h 35min
- Countries: Austria; Switzerland; Poland
- Language: German

Animals (German: Tiere) is a 2017 Austrian / Swiss / Polish mystery film directed by Greg Zglinski.

== Cast ==
- Birgit Minichmayr - Anna
- Philipp Hochmair - Nick
- Mona Petri - Mischa
- Mehdi Nebbou - Tarek
- Michael Ostrowski - Harald
