= Die Wannseekonferenz =

Die Wannseekonferenz may refer to:

- The Wannsee Conference (film), a 1984 German TV film
- Die Wannseekonferenz (2022 film), a German TV docudrama

== See also ==
- Wannsee Conference
