= Katharina Mückstein =

Austrian film director and screenwriter

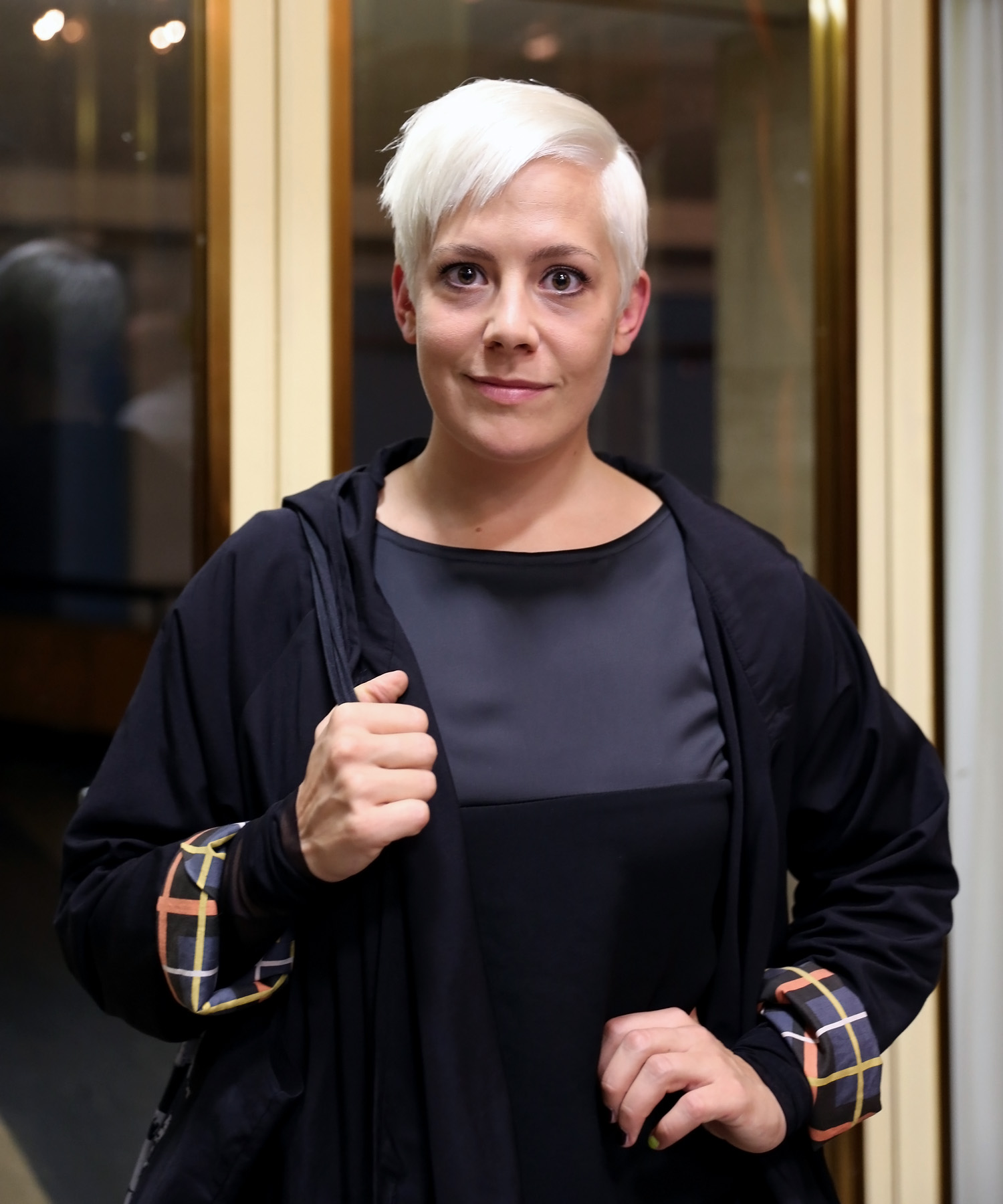
- Mückstein in 2013
- Born: 1982 (age 43–44); Vienna, Austria
- Education: University of Music and Performing Arts Vienna
- Occupations: Film director; screenwriter; producer
- Years active: 2008–present
- Relatives: Wolfgang Mückstein (brother)

Katharina Mückstein (born 1982) is an Austrian film director, screenwriter and producer. Mückstein wrote and directed the feature films Talea (2013) and L'Animale (2018). She also wrote and produced the documentaries Three Farmers and a Son (2016), for which she won the Austrian Film Award for Best Documentary, and Animals and Other People (2017), and wrote and directed the documentary Feminism WTF (2023)–the third most-watched Austrian film of 2023–for which won the Vienna Women's Prize for Best Director in 2023.

== Early life ==
Mückstein was born in Vienna in 1982 and grew up in Bad Vöslau. Her mother, Eva Mückstein, is a psychotherapist and politician of the Green Party of Austria. Her older brother, Wolfgang Mückstein, is a physician and politician who served as Minister of Social Affairs, Health, Care and Consumer Protection in Austria from 19 April 2021 until 8 March 2022.

Mückstein has been interested in feminism and queer philosophy since adolescence and studied gender before going to film school. From 2000 to 2004 she studied Philosophy and gender studies.

She studied filmmaking at the University of Music and Performing Arts Vienna until 2010, where Michael Haneke was one of her teachers. Mückstein said that a "sexist climate" contributed to her dropping out of college. "I kept bringing up various incidents at the Vienna Film Academy, but I didn't feel like I was being taken seriously." Mückstein said she received threatening letters from filmmakers just because she was asking for a gender quota.

== Career ==
In 2008, she directed the short film The Reunion Die Vereinigung. In 2010, she founded the work collective and production company La Banda Film together with Flavio Marchetti, Michael Schindegger and Natalie Schwager.

In 2013, she directed and wrote the screenplay for her first feature film, Talea, starring Nina Proll and Sophie Stockinger. In 2016, she collaborated again with Sophie Stockinger in a leading role for her second feature film, the coming-of-age drama L'Animale, which premiered at the 2018 Berlin Film Festival in the Panorama section. She also produced the 2016 documentary Three Farmers and a Son (Holz Erde Fleisch), for which she won the Austrian Film Award for Best Documentary, and in 2017 she wrote and produced the documentary Animals and Other People (Tiere und andere Menschen). Mückstein hosted the 2017 Austrian Film Award ceremony along with actor Christoph Dostal.

In 2020, Mückstein directed the TV film Blind ermittelt – Zerstörte Träume. She also directed its two sequels released in 2022: Blind ermittelt – Tod im Prater, and Blind ermittelt – Die nackte Kaiserin.

From 22 September to 2 October 2022, Mückstein was a member of the Focus Competition jury of the Zurich Film Festival.

In 2023, Mückstein wrote, directed and produced Feminism WTF, a documentary on feminism and gender equality. It won the Audience Award for Most Popular Film at the 2023 Diagonale Festival of Austrian Film, the Best Director award at the Vienna Women's Prize, and became the third most-watched Austrian film of 2023.

== Activism ==
Mückstein is a feminist and political activist for anti-discrimination agendas in the film industry. Since 2011, she has been a board member of the Association FC Gloria - Women Networking Film (FC Gloria – Frauen Vernetzung Film) for the promotion of female filmmakers in Austria.

On 18 June 2022, Mückstein initiated a debate by sharing on her Instagram account her experiences with sexism and sexual harassment in the film industry since she was 19, such as when a lighting technician insulted her body every day on a film set and then said that he wanted to fuck her, and when she got the funding approval for her first major film, two established male colleagues tried to intervene with the funding agency so that she wouldn't get the money, since they believed that she only got the funding because she was a woman. She also shared an Instagram story that read: "Tonight a perpetrator will stand on the stage and will be applauded. And there is nothing we can do to counter that. It's devastating. I wish all those affected good nerves. #MeToo didn't even start in Austria". No name was given, but the only event of that kind taking place in Austria that night was the premiere of Corsage in Vienna, which led to speculation that Mückstein was referring to someone who worked in that film. Mückstein later said that she couldn't name the man for legal reasons.

Mückstein's Instagram posts inspired several women to share their own experiences with sexual harassment, sexism, racism, homophobia and abuses of power in the Austrian film and theatre community, which Mückstein then shared anonymously on her Instagram account, which generated a lot of debates, media attention and sparked a new wave of the #MeToo Movement in Austria. When Corsage's director, Marie Kreutzer, was asked about it, she told Austrian magazine Profil that she learned about the rumors about one of the actors from Corsage "a long time ago", when the project was already underway, but as long as there are only rumors and no court-confirmed evidence, she will never remove or dismiss a staff member from the stage based on rumors, and if there are neither concrete allegations nor a procedure against someone, she would act as a judge if she reacted with consequences. "There were certainly reports about this man, but they only came from people who were neither affected themselves nor had anything to testify directly. One should stick to the facts, because passing on rumors can seriously damage people; I appreciate Katharina Mückstein extremely for her attitude and her commitment to film politics, we are definitely on the same side. But I would definitely have chosen a different path", she said.

Mückstein wrote in reference to the reasons why many of those affected do not want to speak out openly against perpetrators; "What is your feminism worth if it ends on the edge of your comfort zone?". (...) "Yes, they are men with whom we are acquainted or friends, with whom we may have worked great together - that makes everything more difficult than when it happens in Hollywood". Mückstein's proposal to give a speech on the #MeToo debate on the stage of the Austrian Film Awards ceremony at the end of June 2022 was rejected by the Austrian Film Academy, which choose to release a statement on the matter on their official website instead.

Six months after starting a debate on abuse and sexual harassment in the Austrian film industry, Mückstein said that her involvement hasn't made her survival in the film industry any easier, and that it pushed her even more to the edge of the film industry, as she noticed that people avoid her and that there are a wide variety of attempts to discredit her.

== Filmography ==
=== Films ===
Year	Title	Credited as			Notes			
Year	Title	Director	Screenwriter	Producer	Notes			
Year	Title	2008	The Reunion (Die Vereinigung)	Yes	Notes	Yes	No	Short film
2013	Talea	Yes	Yes	No	Feature film			
2018	L'Animale	Yes	Yes	Yes	Feature film			

=== Documentaries ===
Year	Title	Credited as			Notes		
Year	Title	Director	Screenwriter	Producer	Notes		
Year	Title	2016	Three Farmers and a Son (Holz Erde Fleisch)	No	Notes	No	Yes
2017	Animals and Other People (Tiere und andere Menschen)	No	Yes	Yes			
2023	Feminism WTF	Yes	Yes	Yes			

=== Television ===
Year	Title	Credited as	Notes			
Year	Title	Director	Notes			
Year	Title	2020	Notes	Blind ermittelt – Zerstörte Träume	Yes	TV film
2022	Blind ermittelt – Tod im Prater	Yes	TV film			
2022	Blind ermittelt – Die nackte Kaiserin	Yes	TV film			

== Awards and nominations ==
Year	Award / Festival	Category	Work	Result	Ref.
2009	Thomas-Pluch-Drehbuchpreis	Best Screenplay	The Reunion	Won	
2013	Max Ophüls Festival	Prize of the Minister President of the State of Saarland	Talea	Won	
2013	Zurich Film Festival	Golden Eye - Best German Language Feature Film	Talea	Nominated	
2014	Austrian Film Award	Best Director	Talea	Nominated	
2014	Austrian Film Award	Best Screenplay	Talea	Nominated	
2017	Austrian Film Award	Best Documentary	Three Farmers and a Son	Won	
2018	AFI Fest	Audience Award - New Auteurs	L'Animale	Nominated	
2018	Berlin International Film Festival	Teddy Award - Best Feature Film	L'Animale	Nominated	
2018	Berlin International Film Festival	Panorama Audience Award - Fiction Film	L'Animale	Nominated	
2018	Cinema Jove - Valencia International Film Festival	CIMA Award - Best Film Directed by a Woman	L'Animale	Won	
2018	Cinema Jove - Valencia International Film Festival	Best Film	L'Animale	Nominated	
2018	Jerusalem Film Festival	FIPRESCI Prize - International First Film	L'Animale	Nominated	
2018	Seoul International Women's Film Festival	Best Film	L'Animale	Won	
2018	Mezipatra Queer Film Festival	Grand Jury Prize - Feature Film Competition	L'Animale	Nominated	
2018	Les Arcs Film Festival	Best Narrative Feature	L'Animale	Nominated	
2018	Zurich Film Festival	Golden Eye - Best Film in Focus Switzerland, Germany, Austria	L'Animale	Won	
2019	Austrian Film Award	Best Feature Film	L'Animale	Nominated	
2019	Palm Springs International Film Festival	New Voices/New Visions Grand Jury Prize	L'Animale	Nominated	
2020	Prix Europa	TV Fiction	L'Animale	Nominated	
2023	Diagonale Festival of Austrian Film	Audience Award for Most Popular Film	Feminism WTF	Won	
2023	Munich International Documentary Film Festival	VIKTOR DOK.deutsch – German-speaking Competition	Feminism WTF	Nominated	
2023	Vienna Women's Prize	Best Director	Feminism WTF	Won	
