= Kaprun =

- Municipality
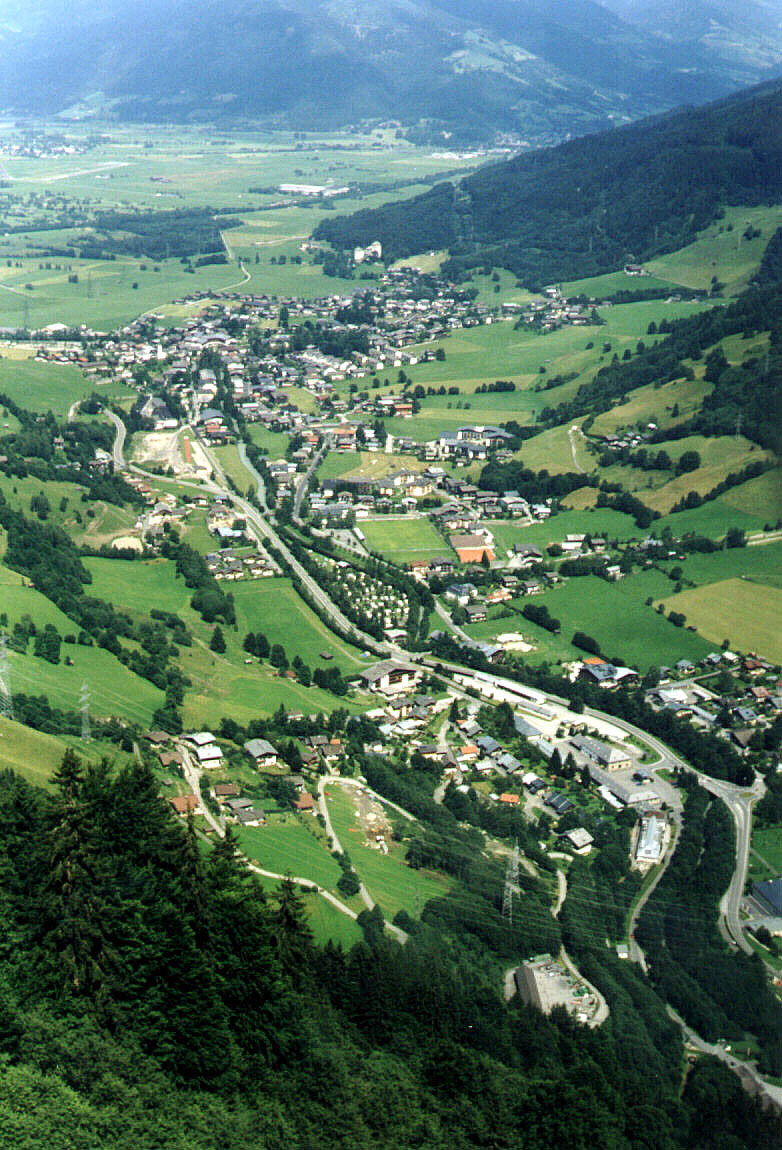
- Kaprun aerial view

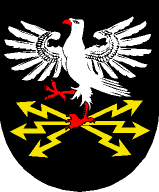
- Coat of arms

- Location within Austria
- Coordinates: 47°16′21″N 12°45′34″E
- Country: Austria
- State: Salzburg
- District: Zell am See (Pinzgau)

Government
  - Mayor: Domenik David (SPÖ)

Area
  - Total: 100.51 km^{2} (38.81 sq mi)
- Elevation: 786 m (2,579 ft)

Population (2018-01-01)
  - Total: 3,177
  - Density: 31.61/km^{2} (81.87/sq mi)
- Time zone: UTC+1 (CET)
  - Summer (DST): UTC+2 (CEST)
- Postal code: 5710
- Area code: 06547
- Vehicle registration: ZE
- Website: www.kaprun.at

Kaprun (German pronunciation: [kaˈpruːn]) is a municipality in the Zell am See District in the province of Salzburg in Austria. Together with the neighboring city of Zell am See the town presents itself as the tourist destination and skiing area "Zell am See-Kaprun". Kaprun distinguishes itself from its larger neighbor at the lake, by offering all year access to the Kitzsteinhorn with its Top of Salzburg viewing platform at 3,029 metres (9,938 ft) altitude and its glacier ski area that is open October through May.

== Geography ==
It is located in the Pinzgau region on the northern slopes of the Alpine Glockner Group with Mt. Großes Wiesbachhorn, 3,564 m (11,693 ft), part of the Hohe Tauern range, forming the border of Salzburg with Carinthia. Located at the foot of the Kitzsteinhorn glacier, Kaprun is a year-round sports center. The Kapruner Ache creek joins the Salzach River south of the settlement. The Mooserboden hydroelectric plant uses water from two reservoirs held back by some of Austria's largest dam walls. The reservoir area has become a tourist attraction, with views over the towns of Kaprun and Zell am See. The visitors centre gives guided tours of the area. Tauern Spa World was completed in November 2010 and is the second largest spa complex in Austria. It is a two-hour transfer to resort from Salzburg Airport.

=== Climate ===
There is a weather station by the Mooserboden reservoir in Kaprun, situated at an elevation of 2,036 m (6,680 ft).

Climate data for Mooserboden: 2,036 metres (6,680 ft) (1981−2010 normals, extremes 1971−2010)
Month	Jan	Feb	Mar	Apr	May	Jun	Jul	Aug	Sep	Oct	Nov	Dec	Year
Record high °C (°F)	10.1 (50.2)	12.0 (53.6)	12.8 (55.0)	14.6 (58.3)	18.7 (65.7)	22.5 (72.5)	24.4 (75.9)	22.8 (73.0)	20.6 (69.1)	19.6 (67.3)	14.1 (57.4)	12.3 (54.1)	24.4 (75.9)
Mean daily maximum °C (°F)	−1.3 (29.7)	−1.2 (29.8)	1.4 (34.5)	4.3 (39.7)	8.6 (47.5)	11.4 (52.5)	13.6 (56.5)	13.2 (55.8)	10.4 (50.7)	7.9 (46.2)	2.1 (35.8)	−0.8 (30.6)	5.8 (42.4)
Daily mean °C (°F)	−5.2 (22.6)	−5.8 (21.6)	−3.5 (25.7)	−0.6 (30.9)	4.2 (39.6)	7.2 (45.0)	9.6 (49.3)	9.3 (48.7)	6.4 (43.5)	3.8 (38.8)	−1.5 (29.3)	−4.3 (24.3)	1.6 (34.9)
Mean daily minimum °C (°F)	−8.3 (17.1)	−8.9 (16.0)	−6.7 (19.9)	−3.7 (25.3)	1.2 (34.2)	4.2 (39.6)	6.5 (43.7)	6.7 (44.1)	3.8 (38.8)	1.1 (34.0)	−4.2 (24.4)	−7.2 (19.0)	−1.3 (29.7)
Record low °C (°F)	−28.7 (−19.7)	−24.4 (−11.9)	−25.5 (−13.9)	−18.2 (−0.8)	−12.2 (10.0)	−5.5 (22.1)	−2.0 (28.4)	−3.2 (26.2)	−6.2 (20.8)	−14.6 (5.7)	−20.3 (−4.5)	−24.7 (−12.5)	−28.7 (−19.7)
Average precipitation mm (inches)	60 (2.4)	49 (1.9)	80 (3.1)	93 (3.7)	131 (5.2)	210 (8.3)	248 (9.8)	224 (8.8)	151 (5.9)	108 (4.3)	86 (3.4)	70 (2.8)	1,510 (59.6)
Average snowfall cm (inches)	63.9 (25.2)	87.4 (34.4)	116.9 (46.0)	94.7 (37.3)	32.6 (12.8)	12.6 (5.0)	1.2 (0.5)	2.7 (1.1)	13.6 (5.4)	32.6 (12.8)	62.6 (24.6)	83.8 (33.0)	604.6 (238.1)
Average precipitation days (≥ 1.0 mm)	10.0	8.9	12.8	13.8	13.9	18.0	18.4	17.3	12.6	10.7	10.8	10.4	157.6
Average snowy days (≥ 1 cm)	29.5	28.3	30.9	29.8	26.2	8.0	1.1	0.8	4.2	12.0	23.4	31.0	225.2
Source: Central Institute for Meteorology and Geodynamics

== History ==
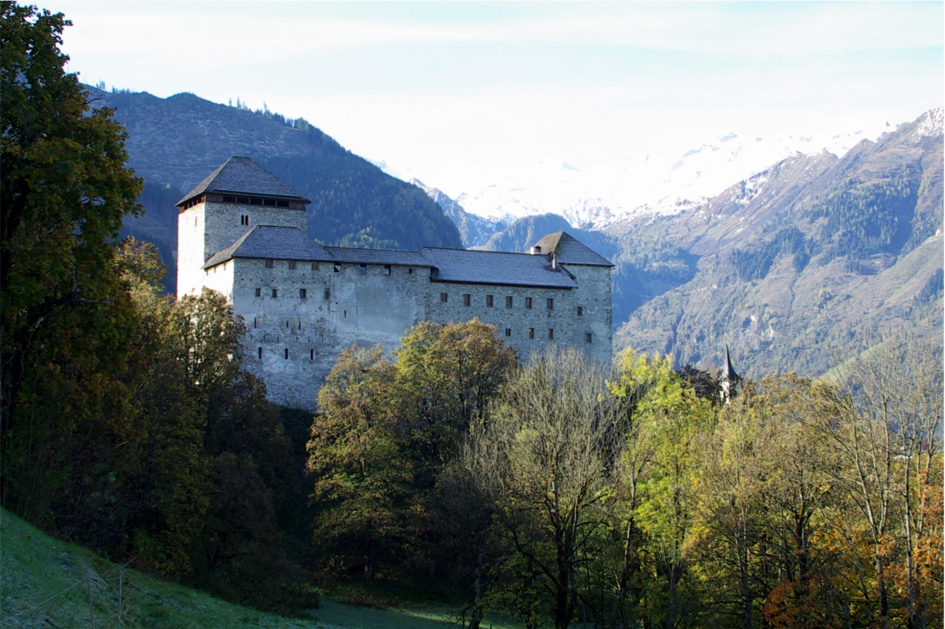
Kaprun Castle

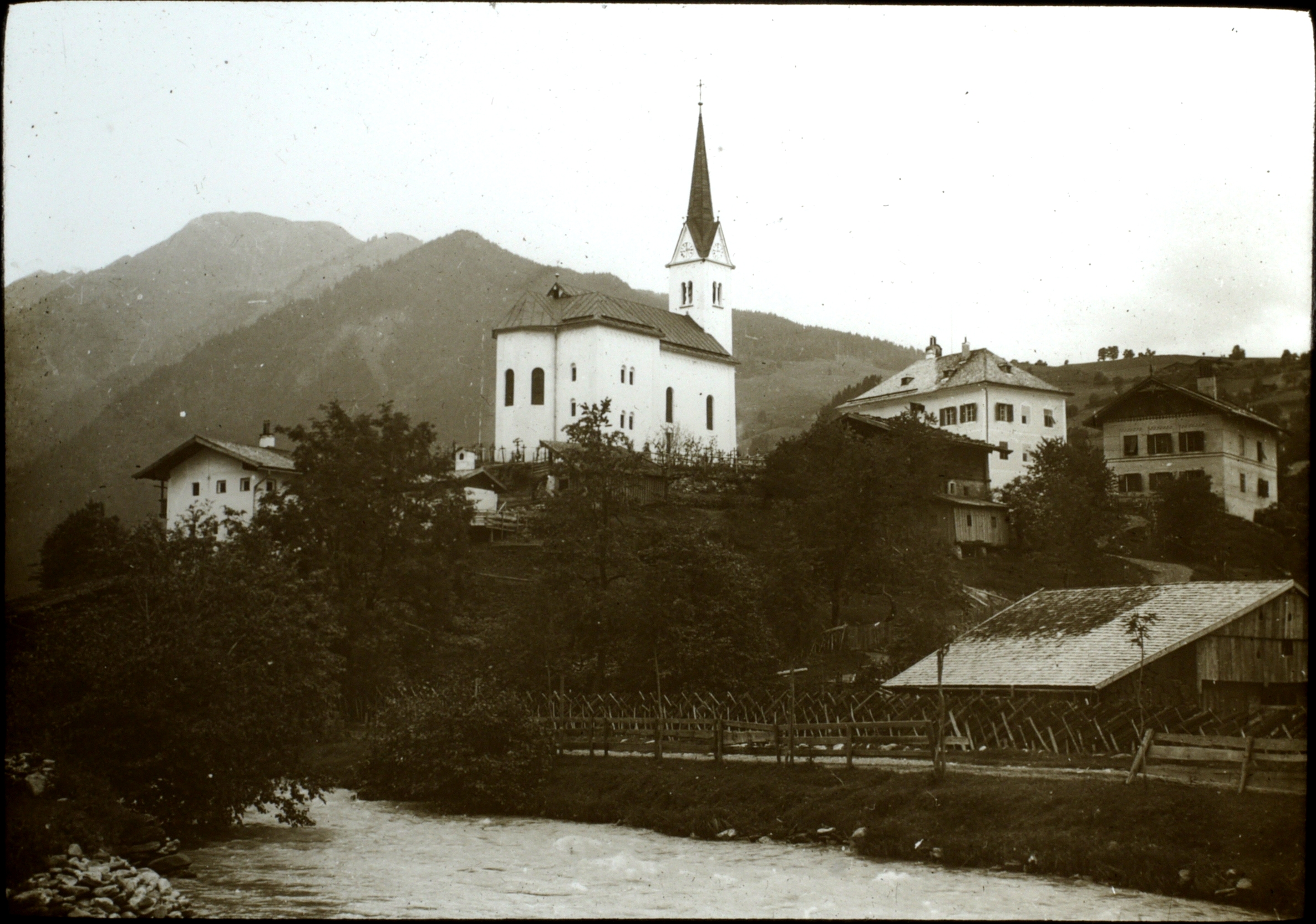
Kaprun July 1903

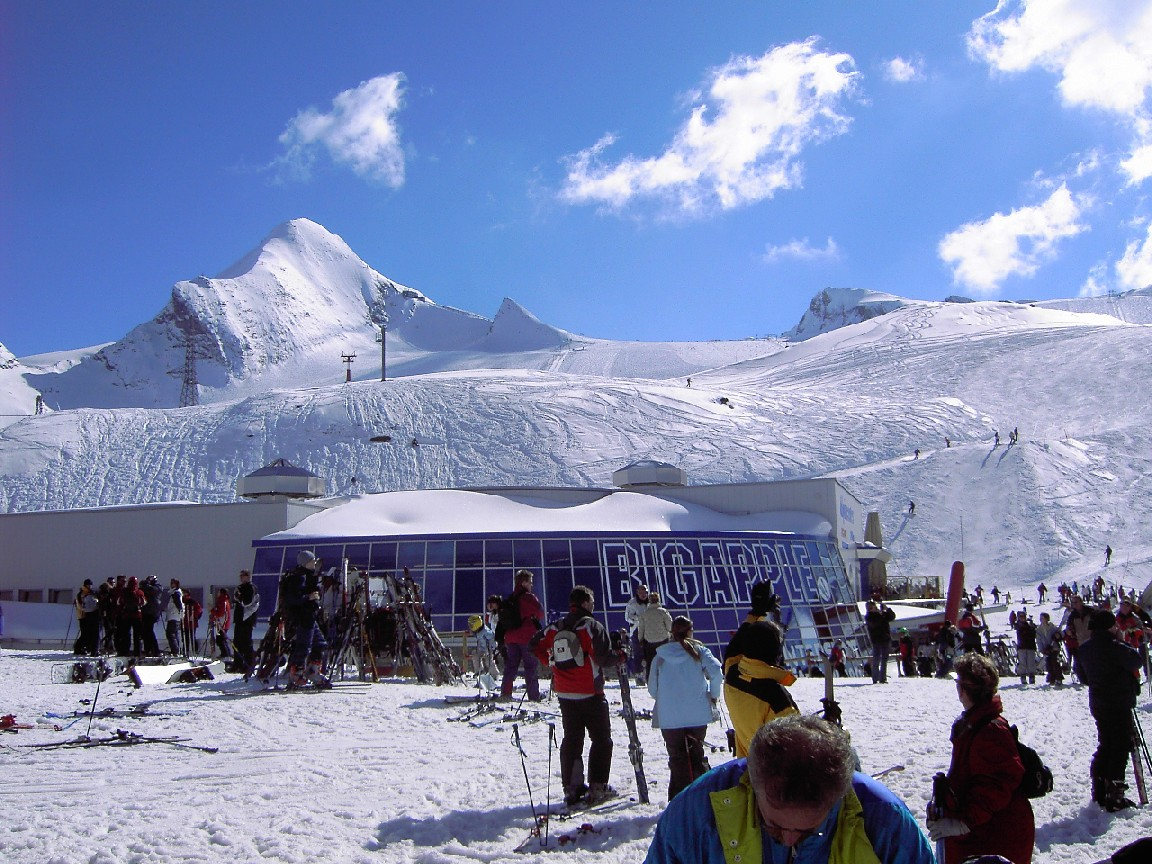
The Kitzsteinhorn

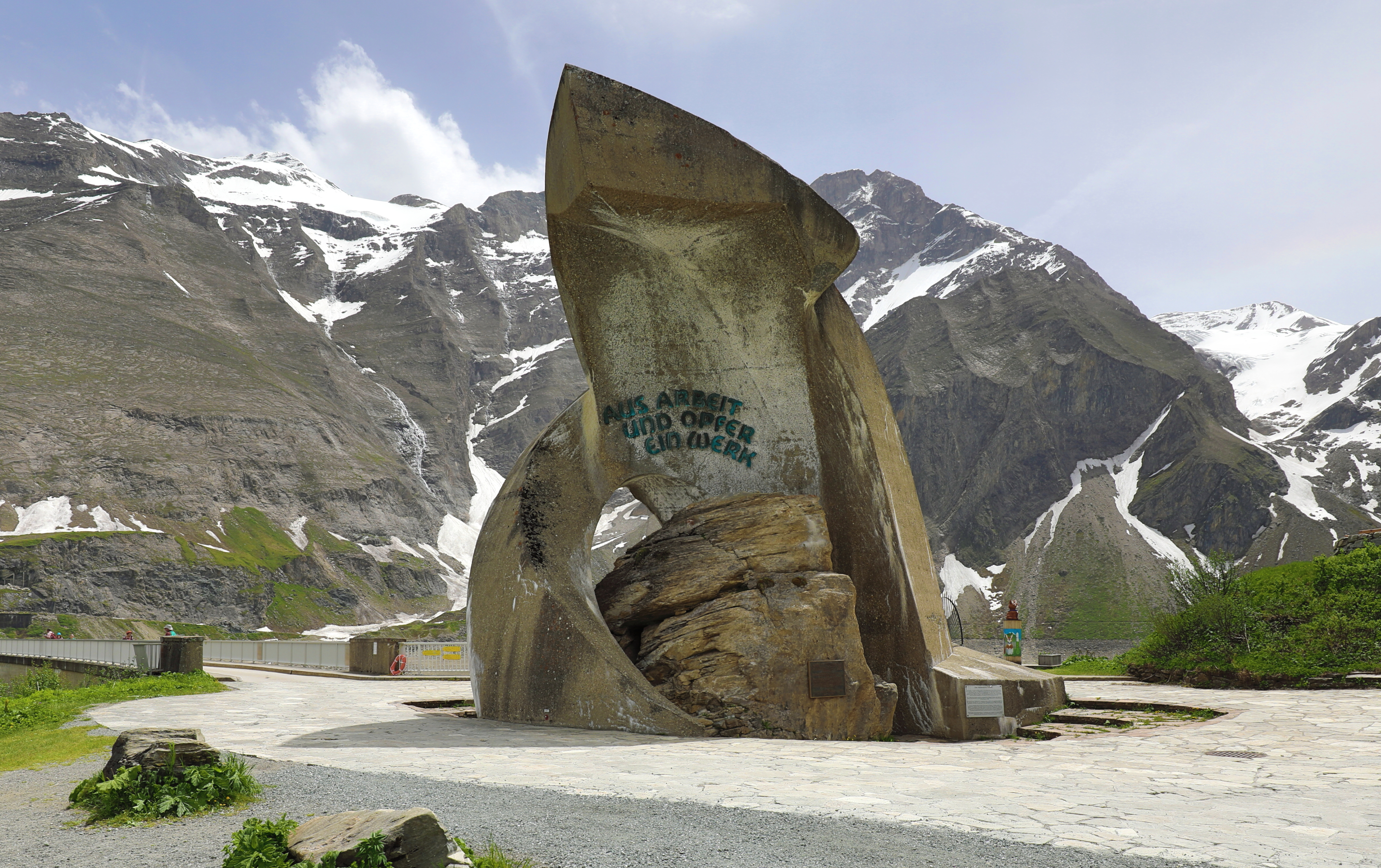
"Heidnische Kirche" on the Mooserboden in Kaprun.

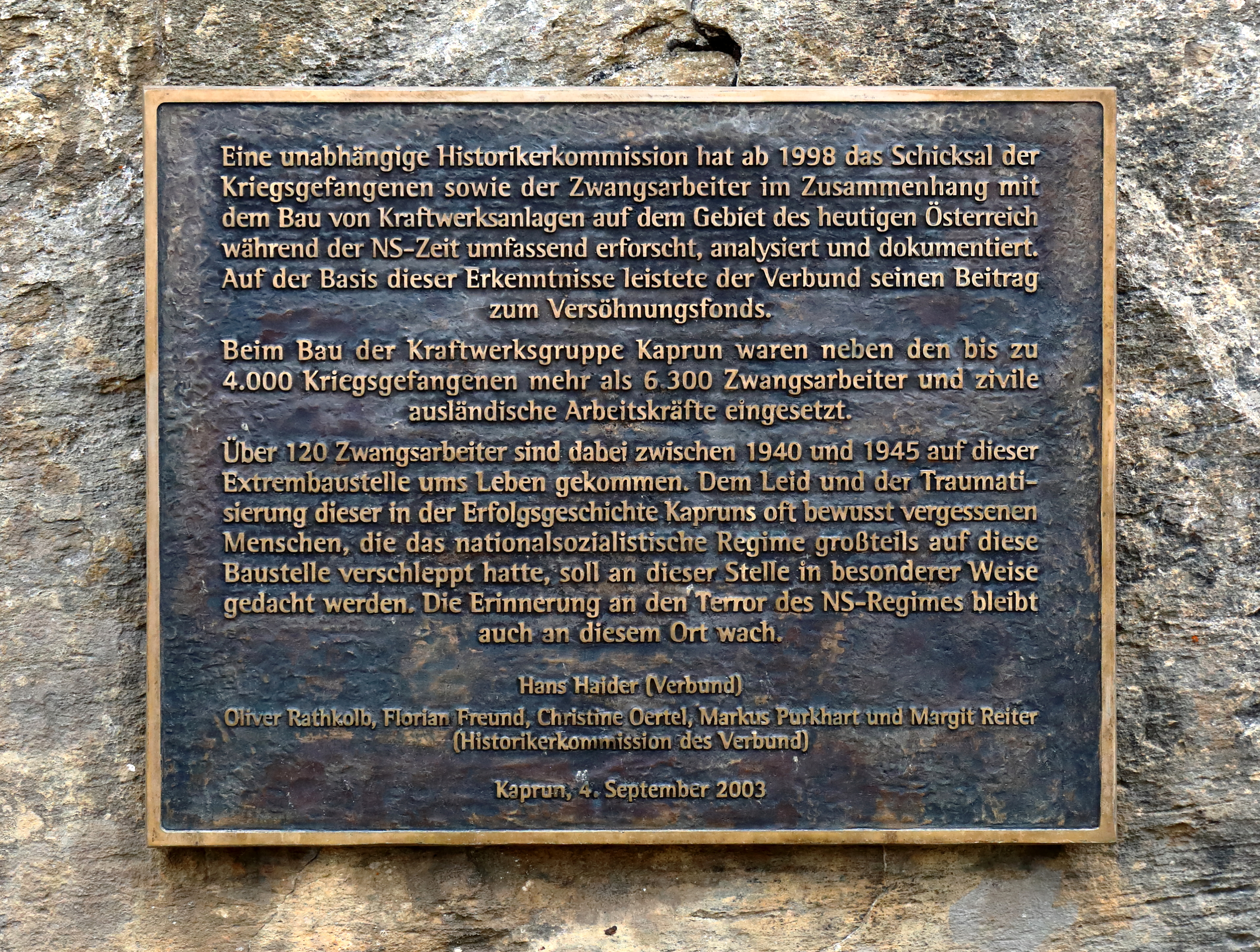
A commemoration sign to the forced-work labourers who perished while building the Kaprun dam during WWII at the "Heidnische Kirche"

A Chataprunnin (derived from Celtic for "whitewater") settlement in the Duchy of Bavaria was first mentioned in a 931 deed, documented as a possession held by the Counts of Falkenstein in 1166. Chaprunne Castle was acquired by the Roman Catholic Archdiocese of Salzburg in 1287 and enfeoffed to the Lords of Felben in 1338. Seat of a Salzburg burgrave from 1480, it was devastated during the 1526 German Peasants' War. In 1606 Archbishop Wolf Dietrich Raitenau had the local burgrave beheaded for siding with local insurgents. In the early 20th century the castle was a possession of Prince Johann II of Liechtenstein, who sold it in 1921. In the late 1920s the German AEG company and the Salzburg state government developed plans for a Hohe Tauern hydroelectricity power plant, including two reservoirs in the Kaprun Valley. Planning was discontinued during the Great Depression and was not resumed until the Austrian Anschluss to Nazi Germany in 1938. Commanded by Hermann Göring, construction began during World War II using prisoners of war from Belgium and other occupied countries and Jewish and Soviet forced labourers. The inhumane conditions were depicted by Nobel laureate Elfriede Jelinek in her 2003 play Das Werk. Construction stopped in 1942/43, and was restarted after the war by Allied-occupied Austria from 1947. Built with Bucyrus equipment and massive help from the Marshall Plan European Recovery Program, the power plant became an icon of post-war reconstruction. The topping out ceremony was held on 23 September 1955, a few months after the signing of the Austrian State Treaty.

== Gletscherbahnen ==
The Kitzsteinhorn is accessed by the Gletscherbahn 1, an aerial lift in three sections, opened on 12 December 1965 to develop the area for glacier skiing. The lowest section, running from Kapruner Thoerl up to the Salzburg Hut, is 2,028 metres (6,654 ft) long and climbs 970 metres (3,180 ft) in altitude. The second section, to the Krefeld Hut, climbs 554 metres (1,818 ft). The third section, from the Krefeld Hut, is 2,192 metres (1.362 miles) long and climbs 575 metres (1,886 ft). This section includes the world's tallest aerial lift pylon, a steel framework construction 113.9 metres (374 ft) (originally 106 metres; 348 ft) high. This pillar was built in 1966 and has of a pipe of 2.2 metres (7.2 feet) diameter in the center, in which a ladder and a maintenance elevator are installed.

Gletscherbahn 2 was a funicular railway with two carriages running from Kaprun to the Kitzsteinhorn which opened on 23 March 1974. This railway had the unusual track gauge of 946 millimetres (3.104 feet), and a length of 3.9 kilometres (2.4 miles), of which 3.3 kilometres (2.1 miles) was through a tunnel. On 11 November 2000, it was the site of the Kaprun disaster, in which 149 skiers lost their lives in a tunnel fire. Six more deaths occurred indirectly. Three died in the shop and restaurant because of smoke. The attendant in the burning train died with the 149 skiers. The smoke killed the attendant and the only passenger in the other identical train. Only twelve people survived the disaster. The tunnel and the funicular railway have remained closed since then. A memorial to the victims, located opposite the present valley station, was dedicated on 11 November 2004.

== See also ==
- Kaprun disaster
