= Helgoland 513 =

- Directed by: Robert Schwentke
- Original language: German
- No. of seasons: 1
- No. of episodes: 7

Helgoland 513 is a 2024 German television series.

== Episodes ==
No.	Title
1	"Your Footprints in the Sand"
2	"Goodbye"
3	"Marble, Stone and Iron Break"
4	"Da Da Da"
5	"Being Strong"
6	"A Song is Going Out Into the World"
7	"Because You Are Leaving"

== Production ==
The series was directed by Robert Schwentke.

== Reception ==
The series won the Public Prize at the 2024 Golden Nymph Awards.
