= Igor Bauersima =

Swiss playwright and director

Igor Bauersima (born 1964 in Prague) is a Swiss writer, director, architect and scenographer. From the late 1990 onward he became a prime mover of new German theater, pioneering the combination of live action and videoprojection in innovative ways, while firmly grounding his plays on philosophical concepts. He pays particular attention to issues relating to problems of morality, human identity, the individual and his relation to society. His work often addresses controversial subjects, either directly or by implication.

== Life ==
Bauersima's family emigrated to Switzerland in 1968 after the suppression of the Prague Spring by the Warsaw Pact Armies.

Bauersima studied Architecture at the Swiss Federal Institute of Technology in Lausanne (EPFL) and at the Swiss Federal Institute of Technology in Zurich (ETHZ), while working as an architect and as an assistant professor for video art. After graduating from the ETH Zürich in 1991, he started his own film production company and travelled the festival circus with self-produced short films. During this time he was playing in avant-jazz bands (Recrash W, Sister Iodine and others) and producing the music for his soundtracks.

From 1994 on he headed the independent theater group OFF OFF Stage, which became one of the most acclaimed Swiss theater companies. Bauersima's stile of writing and staging, often involving quick paced dialogue and a mix of film and theater, is strongly influenced by his experience as filmmaker. Forever Godard(1998), a multi-media play about a group of aspiring actors, won the Impulse prize for best German speaking independent production in 1998. Bauersima left the OFF OFF stage in 2000 to write and direct a play for two young actors. The play was norway.today. Since its first staging in Düsseldorf it has become one of the biggest hits of contemporary German theater. It garnered the audience award at the Mülheim Theater Days, Bauersima was voted upcoming author of 2001 by the critics poll of the magazine Theater Heute and awarded the Bernese Book Award.

Bauersima was the most staged author in German speaking theaters in seasons 2003 and 2004. His plays have been translated into more than twenty languages and staged by over hundred forty theaters worldwide. Since, Bauersima has been writing, directing and stage-designing plays and operas for theaters in Düsseldorf, Vienna, Hamburg, Zürich, Hannover, Stuttgart, Antwerp and others.

In 1998 Bauersima teamed up with French speaking writer/producer Réjane Desvignes to create the content production company sonimage gmbh.

In 1995, while starting his career in theater, Bauersima co-founded the architectural firm W3Architects. He left the company in 2010.

== Plays and productions ==
(D: director, A: author, S: scenographer P: premiere)

- Sexual Perversity in Chicago, David Mamet (1994, D/S, OFF OFF Stage)
- Plane Thoughts (1994, A/D/S, P: OFF OFF stage)
- Tourist Saga (1995, A/D, P: OFF OFF stage)
- The duty to be happy (1996, A/D/S, P: OFF OFF stage)
- Snobs (1997, A/D, P: OFF OFF stage)
- Mixed (1997, A/D/S, P: Theaterhaus Gessnerallee)
- Forever Godard (1998, A/D, P: Theaterhaus Gessnerallee)
- Context (1999, A/D, P: Theaterhaus Gessnerallee)
- Exile (2000, A/D/S, P: Theaterhaus Gessnerallee)
- Norway.today (2000, A/D, P: Schauspielhaus Düsseldorf)
- Capricious Summer by Vladislav Vančura (2001, A/D/S, P: Schauspielhaus Düsseldorf)
- Factory (2001, A, P: Theaterhaus Gessnerallee)
- Futur de Luxe (2002, A/D/S, P: Schauspielhaus Hannover)
- Tattoo, co-author Réjane Desvignes (2002, A/D/S, P: Schauspielhaus Düsseldorf)
- The Shape of Things by Neil LaBute, (2002, D/S, P: Burgtheater, Vienna)
- Film, co-author Réjane Desvignes (2003, A/D/S, Schauspielhaus Hannover)
- Danton's Death, based on Georg Büchner's play (2003, A/D/S, Schauspielhaus Hannover)
- 69 (2003, A/D/S, P: Schauspielhaus Düsseldorf)
- Bérénice de Molière (2004, A/D/S, P: Burgtheater, Vienna – Part 1 of the trilogy 1670)
- Black & White (2004, D/S, P: Schauspielhaus Düsseldorf)
- Lucie de Beaune, co-author Réjane Desvignes, (2005, A/D/S, P: Schauspielhaus Zurich – Part 2 of the trilogy 1670)
- Oh, the Sea – the Rock the Boat Show (2006, A/D/S, P: Schauspielhaus Hamburg)
- Boulevard Sevastopol, co-author Réjane Desvignes (2006, A/D/S, P: Burgtheater, Vienna)
- Le Comte Ory, Gioachino Rossini (2007, D/S, Stuttgart State Opera, Stuttgart)
- Teseo, Georg Friedrich Händel (2009, D/S, Staatsoper Stuttgart, Stuttgart)
- Breath of Death, co-author Réjane Desvignes (2009, A/D/S, Uto-Theater, Zurich)
- The Rage of Life, Opera by Elena Kats-Chernin & Igor Bauersima (2010, A/D/S, P:. Vlaamse Opera Antwerp & Stuttgart State Opera, Stuttgart)
- Cape Horn(2010, A/D/S, P: Theater in der Josefstadt, Vienna)
- Suburbia, Eric Bogosian (2011, D, Theater im Palais, Graz)
- Dream Story, based on Arthur Schnitzler's novella (2011, A/D/S, P: Theater in der Josefstadt, Vienna)
- Jackpot, Réjane Desvignes (2012, D/S, P: Theater in der Josefstadt, Vienna)
- The Salutary Regression of S, (2013/14, A/D/S, P: Tent, Bern)
- Drop dead and see Napoli, (2015, A, P: Tanzhaus, Zürich)
- From the Sun, (2016, A)
- Complicated!, co-author Malou Meyenhofer, (2016, A/S, P: TaG Winterthur)

== Radio plays ==
- Norway.today(a radio play: 2001, P: Deutschland Radio)
- Tattoo, co-author Réjane Desvignes (a radio play: 2003, D, P: Deutschland Radio)
- 69(a radio play: 2004, D, P: Deutschland Radio)
- I'll spit on your graves,, co-author Réjane Desvignes (2004, D, P: Deutschland Radio), a tribute to Boris Vian

== Films ==
- TerminalDiner (New York, 1989)
- Bowling (Czech Republic, 1992)
- 50% Absolute (Hungary, 1995)
- Dr. Younamis' Couch (Zurich, 1996)
- Making Off (Zurich, 1999)
- Un Regard Sur Deux (France, 2001)
- Black White (USA / D 2009)

== Awards ==
- Prize for the best independent theater production on the Impulse Festival NRW 1998
- Invitation to the Mülheim Theatre Days 2001
- Bern Book Award 2001
- Best Young Author of the 2001/2002 season in the critics' poll of the magazine Theater Heute with norway.today
- Best Director Award Young Directors Salzburg 2003
- Nominations for the Austrian Nestroy theater prize for best director and best stage design in 2003 and 2005
