= Kitzsteinhorn =

Mountain in Austria

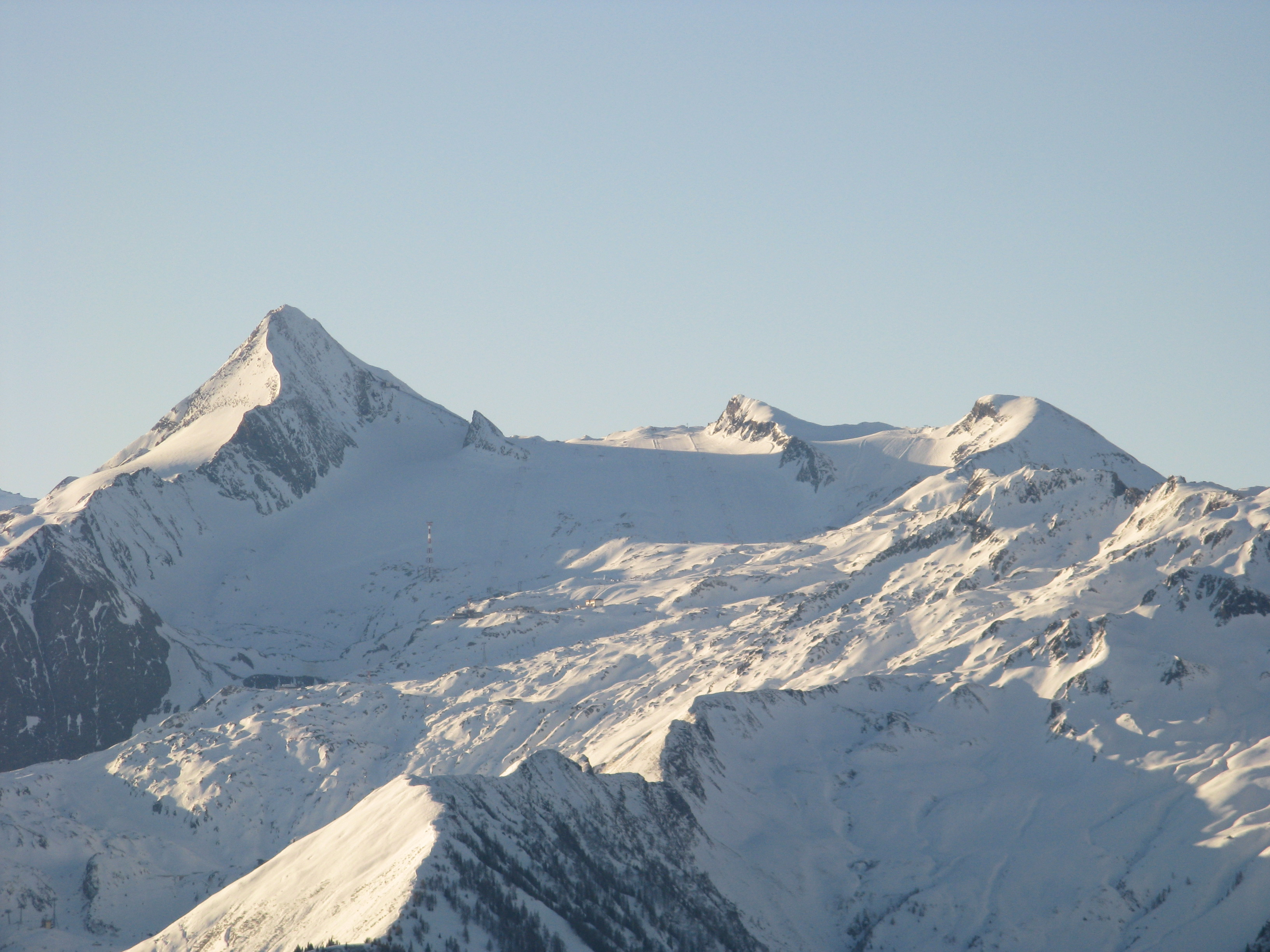
- Kitzsteinhorn peak (left) above the Schmiedingerkees glacier, as seen from Schmittenhöhe, about 16 km to the North

Highest point
- Elevation: 3,203 m (10,509 ft)
- Prominence: 439 m (1,440 ft)
- Listing: Alpine mountains above 3000 m
- Coordinates: 47°11′17″N 12°41′15″E

Geography
- Location within Austria
- Location: Salzburg, Austria
- Parent range: Glockner Group; High Tauern

Climbing
- First ascent: 1828 by Johann Entacher

The Kitzsteinhorn is a mountain in the High Tauern range of the Central Eastern Alps in Austria. It is part of the Glockner Group and reaches a height of 3,203 m (10,509 ft) AA. The Kitzsteinhorn Glaciers are a popular ski area.

== Geography ==
The mountain is located north of the Alpine crest within the municipal area of Kaprun, Salzburg. It was first climbed in 1828 by local mountaineer Johann Entacher.

Today the summit can be easily reached using the Glacier Aerial Tramway from the valley station at 911 m (2,989 ft), including the highest cable car pylon in the world, being 113.6 m (373 ft) tall with a diameter of 2.2 m (7 ft 3 in). There is a restaurant and a panoramic terrace on the roof of the upper station, at 3,029 m (9,938 ft) above sea level.

== Climate change ==
Since the first comprehensive studies of the glacier in the 1960s, some scientists have measured a reduction of glacier surface area by more than two-thirds in 2022.

== Ski area ==
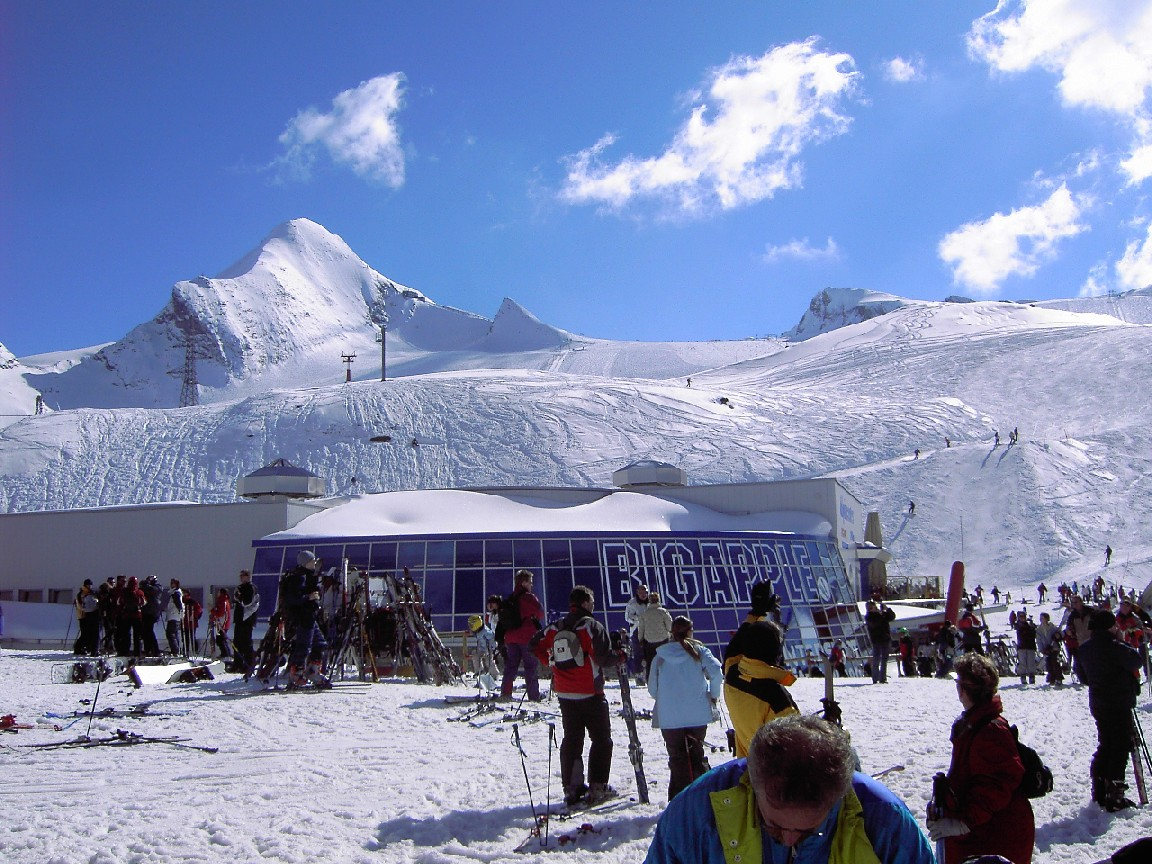
Ski slopes

Skiing on Mt Kitzsteinhorn already began in the early 20th century, when the German and Austrian Alpine Club erected a mountain hut (Krefelder Hütte) in 1907-09. The first cable car was put into operation in December 1965, and opened up the Schmiedingerkees and Maurerkees glaciers, making it the first glacier ski slope in the Austrian Alps. Nevertheless, the resort has to deal with environmental impacts and the global retreat of glaciers since 1850.

An underground funicular railway was opened in 1974, after two and a half years of building works to create the 3,295-metre (10,810 ft) long tunnel, to run in parallel with the cable car, for greater capacity. This funicular was the location of the Kaprun disaster in which 155 people died on 11 November 2000. To replace the funicular, Gletscherjet I (Glacier Jet I), a 24-person funitel, was brought into service on 23 December 2001. Gletscherjet II, a gondola lift, followed in the next year, opening on 19 October 2002.

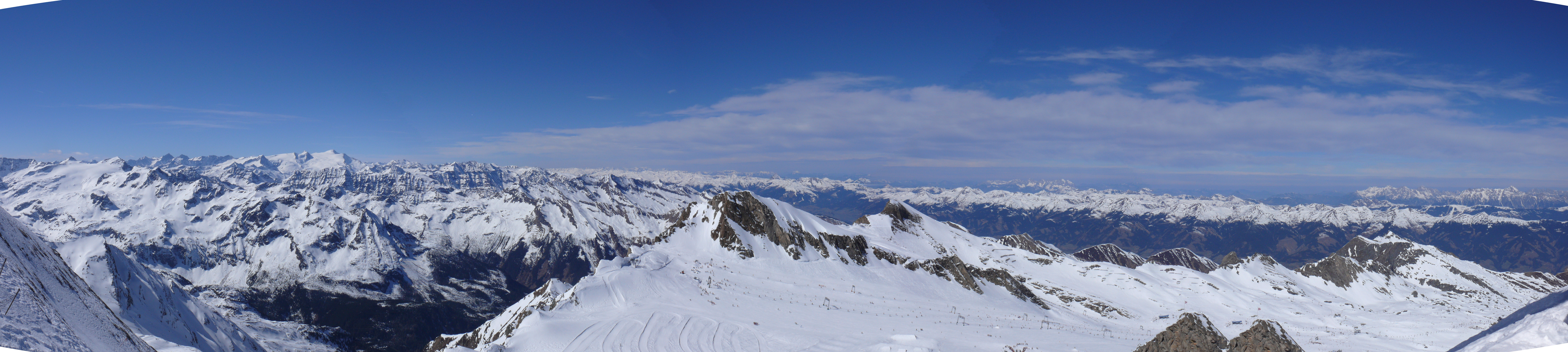
Panorama view from Kitzsteinhorn
