= Schauspielhaus Zürich =

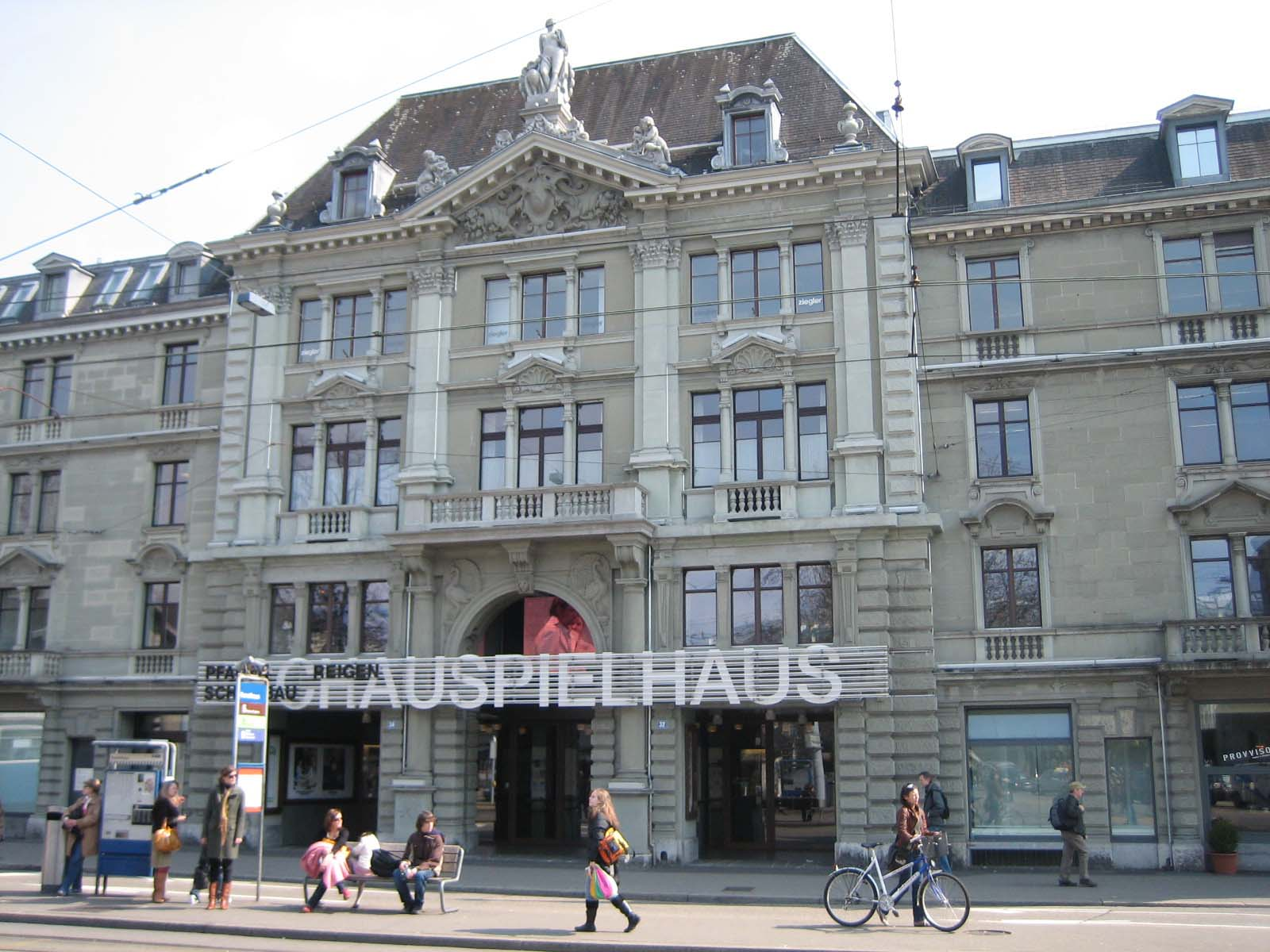
- The theater in 2007
- Former names: Volkstheater am Pfauen
- Alternative names: transl. Zurich playhouse; Pfauenbühne

General information
- Type: Theater
- Location: Zurich, Switzerland
- Coordinates: 47°22′12″N 8°32′57″E
- Completed: 1892
- Renovated: 1926

Other information
- Seating capacity: 750

The Schauspielhaus Zürich (German for 'Zurich playhouse') is one of the most prominent and important theaters in the history of German-speaking theater.

It is also known as "Pfauenbühne". The large theater has 750 seats. The Schauspielhaus also operates three stages in the Schiffbau in the western part of Zurich, the Schiffbau/Halle (400 seats), the Schiffbau/Box (up to 200 seats) and the Schiffbau/Matchbox (80 seats).

== History ==
The building was constructed in 1892 as the Volkstheater am Pfauen (People's Theater on the Pfauen Square) with a Bavarian beer garden and a bowling alley. It served initially as a music hall or vaudeville stage. In 1901 the building was rented by the director of the Zurich Opera House and opened as a playhouse with Goethe's comedy Die Mitschuldigen (The Accomplices). From 1903 until 1926 the playhouse was run by a private cooperative.

In 1926 Zurich wine wholesaler and playhouse director Ferdinand Rieser acquired the building and had it renovated. Then in 1938 it was leased to the Neue Schauspiel AG, a company founded by the city of Zurich in order to save the theater from its financial difficulties. When the lease ran out in 1952, the citizens of Zurich refused to purchase the building for the proposed price of 3 million Swiss francs. Upon their refusal, UBS AG, a Swiss banking group, stepped in to purchase the building and arranged a new lease arrangement with the Neue Schauspiel AG.

However, the effort to establish an ambitious theater in Zurich met with little success at first, and until 1933 the theater was rarely thought of outside of Switzerland.

After the rise of the Nazis in 1933, however, many important actors and directors immigrated to Switzerland from Germany and Austria. With the help of these artists, the theater achieved great success, staging many anti-fascist works, importantly the world premiers of several plays by Bertolt Brecht. During this time the Schauspielhaus Zürich was the largest free stage in the German-speaking world, as stages in Germany and Austria were strictly regulated.

After the war, the theater retained its important place in world and German-language theater. During this time it saw world premiers of such important playwrights as Max Frisch, Friedrich Dürrenmatt, Carl Zuckmayer, Georges Schehadé, Botho Strauß and Yasmina Reza.

Established in 1959, the Theater am Hechtplatz served for a short time as a second stage.

From 2000 to 2004, under director Christoph Marthaler, the theater flourished artistically and was chosen as theater of the year twice by Theater heute (Theater Today), the most important and widely read German theater publication.

Since summer 2009 the Schauspielhaus Zürich is headed by Barbara Frey. The house's repertoire spans the whole history of theatre literature, from the old Greek up to the first performances of contemporary plays.

== Directors ==
- 1929–1938: Ferdinand Rieser
- 1938–1961: Oskar Wälterlin, Otto Tausig
- 1961–1964: Kurt Hirschfeld
- 1965–1968: Leopold Lindtberg
- 1968–1969: Teo Otto, Erwin Parker, Otto Weissert
- 1969–1970: Peter Löffler
- 1970–1977: Harry Buckwitz
- 1978–1982: Gerhard Klingenberg
- 1982–1989: Gerd Heinz
- 1989–1992: Achim Benning
- 1992–1999: Gerd Leo Kuck
- 1999–2000: Reinhard Palm
- 2000–2004: Christoph Marthaler
- 2004–2005: Andreas Spillmann
- 2005–2009: Matthias Hartmann
- 2009–2019: Barbara Frey
- since 2019: Nicolas Stemann and Benjamin von Blomberg
