= Benjamin von Blomberg =

German dramaturge (born 1978)

Benjamin von Blomberg (born 1978) is a German dramaturge.

== Life and work ==
Von Blomberg studied music history, German studies, and business studies in Hamburg. As a student, he founded the independent opera group "evviva la diva" with his friend, the director Benedikt von Peter. He worked with this group as a dramaturge and producer on projects in Berlin, Düsseldorf, and Hamburg, both as a dramaturge and producer. In 2005, he worked as a dramaturge at the Thalia Theater (Hamburg), first on a production of Dea Loher's "Quixote in the city", directed by Andreas Kriegenburg. He continued to work at the Thalia Theatre from 2006 - 2010, under creative directors Ulrch Khuon and Joachim Lux. He continued to participate in operatic projects on the side, including a 2007 production of George Frideric Handel's "Handel", directed by Christof Loy. Beginning in 2010, he also began to work in an independent capacity in a variety of settings, including in Berlin, Hamburg, Hannover, at the Salzburg Festival and in Zurich. During this time, he collaborated with Nicolas Stemann, Stefan Pucher, Benedikt von Peter, and Frank Abt.

In 2012, Theater heute named Von Blomburg as its dramaturge of the year.

Von Blomberg is a father and lives with his family in Hannover.
