= Austrian Film Award =

National film award of Austria

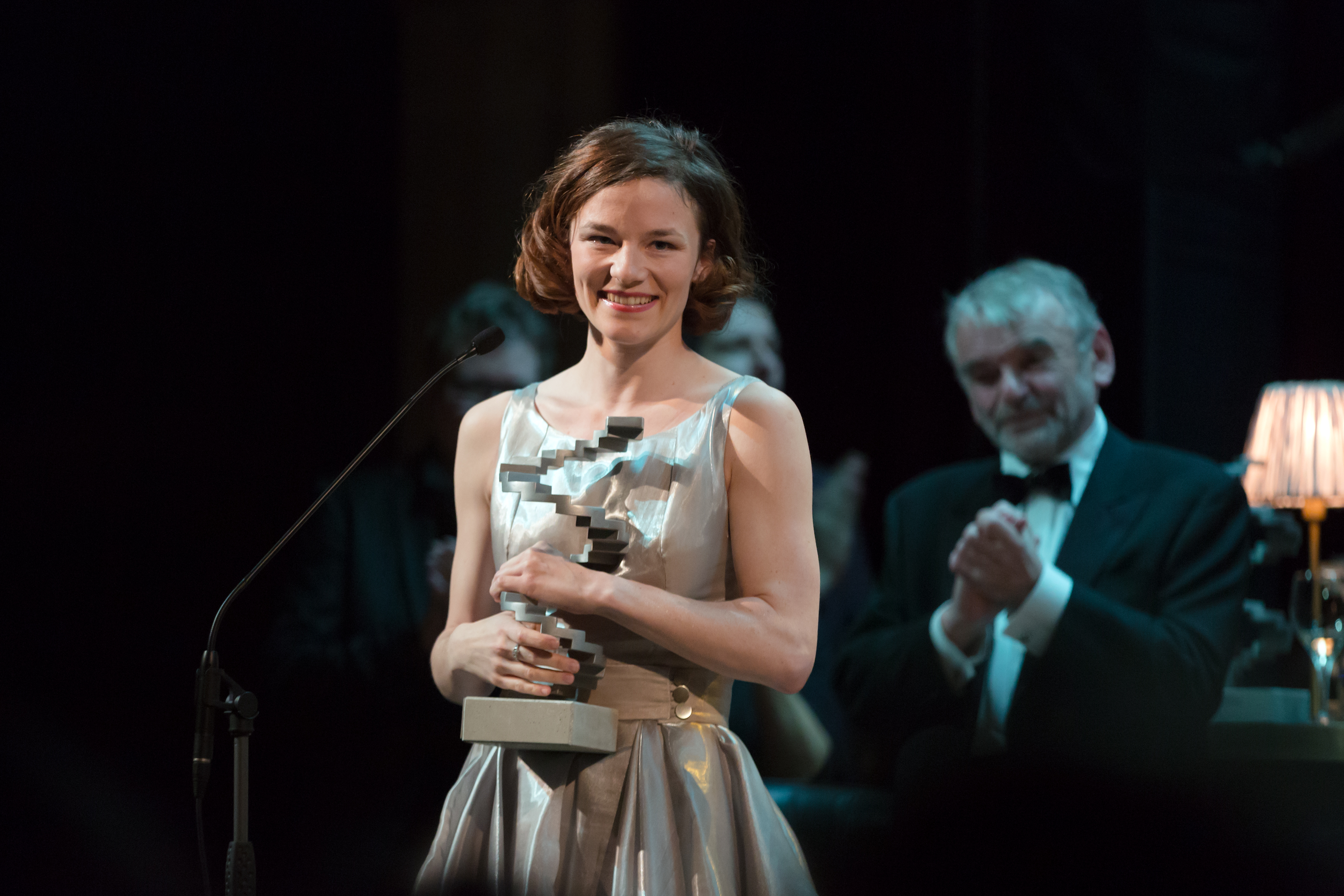
- Best Actress winner Valerie Pachner at the Austrian Film Award ceremony in 2017.
- Awarded for: Excellence in cinematic achievements
- Country: Austria
- Presented by: Austrian Film Academy
- First award: 2011
- Website: oesterreichische-filmakademie.at

The Austrian Film Award (German: Österreichischer Filmpreis), is the annual national film award of Austria, first given out in 2011. It is voted on by members of the Austrian Film Academy (German: Österreichische Filmakademie), which was founded in 2009 and consists of distinguished professionals from the Austrian film industry. The trophy was designed by media artist Valie Export.

The 2020 edition saw the drama Joy winning four awards, including the top prize for Best Fiction Film.

== Categories ==
- Best Film: since 2011
- Best Director: since 2011
- Best Actor in a Leading Role: since 2011
- Best Actress in a Leading Role: since 2011
- Best Screenplay: Since 2011
- Best Cinematography: Since 2011
- Best Editing: Since 2011
- Best Production Design: Since 2011
- Best Costume Design: Since 2011
- Best Makeup: Since 2011
- Best Score: Since 2011
- Best Sound: 2011
- Best Documentary: Since 2011
- Best Short Film: Since 2013
- Best Actor in a Supporting Role: Since 2016
- Best Actress in a Supporting Role: Since 2016

== Ceremonies ==
Edition	Date	Host(s)	Venue	Best Film
1st	29 January 2011	Rupert Henning	Viennesse Arsenal	The Unintentional Kidnapping of Mrs. Elfriede Ott
2nd	27 January 2012	Rupert Henning	Rosenhügel Film Studios	Breathing
3rd	23 January 2013	Rupert Henning	Vienna City Hall	Paradise: Love
4th	22 January 2014	Karl Markovics	Schloss Grafenegg	Your Beauty Is Worth Nothing
5th	28 January 2015	Karl Markovics	Vienna City Hall	The Dark Valley
6th	20 January 2016	Jessica Hausner, Philipp Hochmair, Christiane Hörbiger, Gabriele Kranzelbinder, Catalina Molina, David Schalko, Eva Spreitzhofer & Mirjam Unger	Schloss Grafenegg	Goodnight Mommy
7th	1 February 2017	Christoph Dostal & Katharina Mückstein	Vienna City Hall	Thank You For Bombing
8th	31 January 2018	Hilde Dalik & Christoph Grissemann	Schloss Grafenegg	The Best of All Worlds
9th	30 January 2019	Nicholas Ofczarek & Caroline Peters	Vienna City Hall	Murer: Anatomie eines Prozesses
10th	30 January 2020	Markus Schleinzer & Salka Weber	Schloss Grafenegg	Joy
11th	8 July 2021	Michaela Schausberger, Arman T. Riahi, and Arash T. Riahi	Globe Wien	The Trouble with Being Born
12th	30 June 2022	Julia Edtmeier and Michael Ostrowski	Schloss Grafenegg	Great Freedom
13th	15 June 2023	Julia Jelinek and Thomas Mraz	Globe Wien	Vera
14th	5 June 2024	Emily Cox and Dirk Stermann	Wiener Rathaus	The Devil's Bath

== See also ==
- German Film Award
- Swiss Film Award
