= Karl May film adaptations =

Karl May film adaptations are films based on stories and characters by German author Karl May (1842–1912). The characters Old Shatterhand, Winnetou, and Kara Ben Nemsi are very famous in Central Europe.

In most of the film versions the novels were reworked to a great extent, some movies using only the names of characters invented by Karl May. For example, in the book Der Schatz im Silbersee (Treasure of Silver Lake) the main character was called "Old Firehand" – in the movie he was renamed "Old Shatterhand" (played by American actor Lex Barker) after the more famous character. The movies Old Shatterhand (Apaches' Last Battle), Winnetou and Old Firehand (Thunder at the Border) and Winnetou und das Halbblut Apanatschi (Winnetou and the Crossbreed) are not based on any of May's works, but were completely invented by the screenwriters. Several TV productions, such as Das Buschgespenst and Kara Ben Nemsi Effendi, were much closer to the novels.

In foreign distribution, most of the movie titles were not translated directly into the target language, but new movie titles were made up. For American distribution the makers of the movie posters also invented some new color formats such as Flaming Arrow Color for the movie Der Schatz im Silbersee and Apache Color for Winnetou 1. Teil (called Apache Gold in America).

The silent movies of the 1920s are now probably lost.

For 10 movies in the 1960s, German composer Martin Böttcher wrote landmark film scores, whose success also helped the movies' international success and influenced the Italian movie industry to make Western movies of their own and create a whole new genre, the Spaghetti Western (whose most successful composer Ennio Morricone came to fame just after Martin Böttcher).

Michael Herbig's 2001 film Der Schuh des Manitu satirized the Karl May films of the 1960s to great commercial success in Germany.

== Theatrical films ==
- Auf den Trümmern des Paradieses (On the Brink of Paradise) (1920), dir.: Josef Stein (silent film)
- Die Todeskarawane (Caravan of Death) (1920), dir.: Josef Stein (silent)
- Die Teufelsanbeter (The Devil Worshippers, informal) (1920), dir.: Ertugrul Moussin-Bey (silent)
- Durch die Wüste (Across the Desert) (1936), dir.: Johannes Alexander Hübler-Kahla (first sound film)
- Die Sklavenkarawane (–) (1958), dir.: Georg Marischka / Ramón Torrado (first color film)
- Der Löwe von Babylon (–) (1959), dir.: Johannes Kai (= Hanns Wiedmann) / Ramón Torrado
- Der Schatz im Silbersee (Treasure of Silver Lake) (1962), dir.: Dr. Harald Reinl
- Winnetou 1. Teil (Apache Gold) (1963), dir.: Dr. Harald Reinl
- Old Shatterhand (Apaches' Last Battle) (1964), dir.: Hugo Fregonese
- Der Schut (Yellow Devil a.k.a. The Shoot) (1964), dir.: Robert Siodmak
- Winnetou – 2. Teil (Last of the Renegades) (1964), dir.: Dr. Harald Reinl
- Unter Geiern (Frontier Hellcat a.k.a. Among Vultures) (1964), dir.: Alfred Vohrer
- Der Schatz der Azteken (The Treasure of the Aztecs) (1965), dir.: Robert Siodmak
- Die Pyramide des Sonnengottes (The Pyramid of the Sun God) (1965), dir.: Robert Siodmak
- Der Ölprinz (The Oil Prince a.k.a. Rampage at Apache Wells) (1965), dir.: Harald Philipp
- Durchs wilde Kurdistan (Wild Kurdistan a.k.a. The Wild Men of Kurdistan) (1965), dir.: Franz Josef Gottlieb
- Winnetou – 3. Teil (The Desperado Trail) (1965), dir.: Dr. Harald Reinl
- Old Surehand 1. Teil (Flaming Frontier) (1965), dir.: Alfred Vohrer
- Im Reiche des silbernen Löwen (Kingdom of the Silver Lion a.k.a. Fury of the Sabers) (1965), dir.: Franz Josef Gottlieb
- Das Vermächtnis des Inka (Legacy of the Incas) (1965), dir.: Georg Marischka
- Winnetou und das Halbblut Apanatschi (Winnetou and the Crossbreed) (1966), dir.: Harald Philipp
- Winnetou und sein Freund Old Firehand (Winnetou and Old Firehand a.k.a. Thunder at the Border) (1966), dir: Alfred Vohrer
- Winnetou und Shatterhand im Tal der Toten (The Valley of Death) (1968), dir.: Dr. Harald Reinl
- Die Spur führt zum Silbersee (The Trace Leads to the Silver Lake) (1990), dir.: Günter Rätz
- Der Schuh des Manitu (The Shoe of the Manitou) (2001), dir.: Michael Herbig
- Bullyparade – Der Film (Bullyparade – The Movie) (2017), dir.: Michael Herbig
- Der junge Häuptling Winnetou (2022), dir.: Mike Marzuk

== Television ==
- Mit Karl May im Orient – 1963, 6 episodes
- Kara Ben Nemsi Effendi – 1973/75, 26 episodes
- Mein Freund Winnetou (My Friend Winnetou – French: Winnetou le Mescalero) – 1980, 14 episodes
- Das Buschgespenst – 1986, 2 episodes
- Präriejäger in Mexiko – 1988, 2 episodes
- Winnetous Rückkehr – 1998, 2 episodes
- WinneToons (German animated series) – 26 episodes
- Winnetou – Der Mythos lebt – 2016, 3 episodes

== Discography ==
- "Wilder Westen – Heißer Orient" – Karl-May-Filmmusik 1936–1968

Bear Family Records BCD 16413 HL – 8 CDs with 192-page movie-book

- "Winnetou Melodie – Martin Böttcher dirigiert seine großen Karl-May-Erfolge" (1971/1991)

Convoy (East West Records, Time Warner, distributed by Karussel Musik and Video GmbH, 849 824-2)

== Literature ==
- Michael Petzel: Karl May Filmbuch, Karl-May-Verlag, Bamberg, ISBN 3-7802-0153-4
