= Treasure of Silver Lake =

1962 Western film directed by Harald Reinl

- Original poster
- Directed by: Harald Reinl
- Screenplay by: Harald G. Petersson
- Based on: Treasure of Silver Lake by Karl May
- Produced by: Horst Wendlandt
- Starring: Lex Barker; Pierre Brice; Götz George; Herbert Lom; Karin Dor
- Cinematography: Ernst W. Kalinke
- Edited by: Hermann Haller
- Music by: Martin Böttcher
- Production companies: Rialto Film; Jadran Film
- Distributed by: Constantin Film (West Germany); Jadran Film (Yugoslavia)
- Release dates: 14 December 1962 (West Germany); 14 March 1963 (Yugoslavia)
- Running time: 111 minutes
- Countries: West Germany; Yugoslavia
- Language: German
- Box office: $29 million (est.)

Treasure of Silver Lake (German: Der Schatz im Silbersee) is a 1962 Western film directed by Harald Reinl, loosely based on German author Karl May's 1891 novel of the same title. It was the first in a highly-successful series of films based on May's works by the West German studios Rialto and Constantin Film, starring American actor Lex Barker as the frontiersman Old Shatterhand and French actor Pierre Brice as the Apache warrior Winnetou.

Filmed on-location in Croatia (then part of Yugoslavia) as a co-production with Jadran Studios, the film was released in West Germany on 14 December 1962. It was the highest-grossing German-language film of that year, and its success demonstrated the viability of European-produced Western films, laying the groundwork for the Spaghetti Western.

== Plot ==
Fred Engel's father is murdered by Colonel Brinkley in order to acquire a treasure map, however the Colonel only acquires half of it, the other half is held by Mrs. Butler. Discovering the scene of the crime, Old Shatterhand and Winnetou help Fred bring his father's murderer to justice and locate the treasure of Silver Lake.

== Cast ==
- Lex Barker as Charlie "Old Shatterhand"
- Pierre Brice as Winnetou
- Götz George as Fred Engel
- Herbert Lom as Colonel Brinkley
- Karin Dor as Ellen Patterson
- Eddi Arent as Lord Castlepool
- Marianne Hoppe as Mrs. Butler
- Ralf Wolter as Sam Hawkens
- Sima Janicijevic as Patterson
- Ilija Ivezić as Hilton
- Mirko Boman as Gunstick Uncle
- Branko Špoljar as Doc Jefferson Hartley
- Milivoj Stojanovic as Knox
- Slobodan Dimitrijević as Rollender Donner
- Jozo Kovacevic as Grosser Wolf
- Velimir Chytil as Woodward

== Production ==
The rights to Karl May's bestselling novels were purchased by producer Horst Wendlandt, who hired writers Harald G. Petersson, Gerhard F. Hummel, and Hans Wiedemann to develop treatments based on the first three Old Shatterhand-Winnetou novels.

The film was a significant financial investment for both Rialto Film and Constantin Film, with a projected budget exceeding that of most West German films at the time. As a cost-cutting measure, the films were co-produced with the Yugoslavian company Jadran Film. It was also thought that filming on-location in Yugoslavia (primarily Croatia) would be a better fit for the film's Southwestern American setting, as well as the large amount of period costumes and experienced stuntmen.

Expatriate American star Lex Barker was cast as Old Shatterhand, and French actor Pierre Brice as Winnetou. As neither was fluent in German at the time, their dialogues were dubbed, Barker by Horst Niendorf and Herbert Stass. Most of the Yugoslav supporting cast was dubbed as well.

Principal photography took place primarily in the Paklenica National Park in Zadar County, Croatia.

== Reception ==
The film was a phenomenal success, predating that of Sergio Leone's films. This helped provide a cultural and financial context for the later Spaghetti Western films, many of which had West German co-producers and financial interests.

=== Box office ===
Treasure of Silver Lake was the highest-grossing film of 1962 in West Germany, selling 10 million tickets and grossing €8.6 million ($9 million).

In France, it was the 29th top-grossing film of 1963, selling 1,656,736 tickets. This was equivalent to an estimated $1,030,000 in gross revenue. (Note: See Average ticket price § List.)

In the Soviet Union, the film sold 39.8 million tickets in 1974. This was equivalent to an estimated $19 million in gross revenue.

This adds up to a total of 51,456,736 tickets sold worldwide, grossing an estimated $29 million in worldwide revenue.

== Sequels ==
The success of the film spawned 10 direct sequels starring Barker and/or Brice, released between 1963 and :

- Apache Gold (1963, de: Winnetou or Winnetou – 1. Teil)
- Old Shatterhand (1964). Unlike the other films, this one was not produced by Rialto, but by rival producer Artur Brauner's CCC Film.
- Last of the Renegades (1964, de: Winnetou – 2. Teil)
- Among Vultures (1964, de: Unter Geiern)
- The Desperado Trail (1965, de: Winnetou – 3. Teil)
- The Oil Prince (1965, de: Der Ölprinz)
- Winnetou and the Crossbreed (1966, de: Winnetou und das Halbblut Apanatschi)
- The Valley of Death (1968, de: Winnetou und Shatterhand im Tal der Toten)

Aside from Barker and Brice, other recurring actors in the films included Ralf Wolter (as Sam Hawkens), Stewart Granger (as Old Surehand), Marie Versini (as Nscho-tschi), Götz George, Walt Barnes, Karin Dor, Gojko Mitić, Terence Hill, Rik Battaglia and Branko Špoljar.
