= Among Vultures =

1964 film

- Directed by: Alfred Vohrer
- Written by: Eberhard Keindorff; Johanna Sibelius
- Story by: Karl May
- Produced by: Erwin Gitt; Stipe Gurdulic; Horst Wendlandt
- Starring: Stewart Granger; Pierre Brice; Elke Sommer
- Cinematography: Karl Löb
- Edited by: Hermann Haller
- Music by: Martin Böttcher
- Production companies: Rialto Film; Jadran Film; Societé Nouvelle de Cinématographie
- Distributed by: Constantin Film (West Germany); British Lion Films (United Kingdom); Columbia Pictures (United States)
- Release dates: 7 December 1964 (West Germany); November 1966 (United States)
- Running time: 101 minutes
- Countries: West Germany; France; Italy; Yugoslavia
- Language: German
- Box office: 577,441 admissions (France); 1,778,713 admissions (Spain) over $3 million (Germany)

Among Vultures (German: Unter Geiern) is a 1964 Red Western film directed by Alfred Vohrer and starring Stewart Granger, Pierre Brice, Elke Sommer and Götz George. It was also released as Frontier Hellcat.

The film was a co-production between West Germany, France, Italy and Yugoslavia. It was shot at the Spandau Studios in Berlin and on location in Yugoslavia, particularly in Croatia. The film's sets were designed by the art director Vladimir Tadej. The story is based on the eponymous novel by Karl May.

== Plot ==
In the late 19th century on the Llano Estacado, pioneer Baumann and his son Martin find their farm raided, Baumann's wife killed. After the attack, various characters arrive, including a Mormon preacher named Weller and a military officer. Weller claims Shoshoni Indians are the culprits, and the officer pledges a punitive expedition. However, Martin, unconvinced, confides in fellow travelers Old Surehand, Old Wabble, and Annie. They uncover that Weller and the officer are part of the "Vultures" gang, the true attackers. The fake officer dies, and Weller escapes, having learned that Annie is carrying a package of diamonds.

The Vultures plan to attack the pioneers, and Old Surehand, Old Wabble, Martin, and Annie set out to warn them. Annie falls into the hands of the bandits, prompting Martin to infiltrate and rescue her with help from Winnetou, an Apache chief and Old Surehand's friend. Meanwhile, Baumann is captured by the Shoshoni, whom he blames for his wife's death. Old Surehand intervenes, demonstrating his shooting skills to secure Baumann's release and convincing the Shoshoni to join forces against the Vultures.

Returning to the pioneer camp, Old Surehand exposes a Vultures spy (Weller) and forces him to send false information to lure the gang leader into a trap. The confrontation unfolds, with the Vultures overwhelmed by the combined firepower of pioneers and Shoshoni. Despite Weller's escape and capture of Martin, the final showdown results in the Vultures' defeat. Weller is revealed as the true murderer of Mrs. Baumann. Old Surehand solemnly pledges to lead the pioneers to Arizona.

== Cast ==
- Stewart Granger as Old Surehand
- Pierre Brice as Winnetou
- Elke Sommer as Annie Dillman
- Götz George as Martin Baumann Jr.
- Walter Barnes as Martin Baumann Sr.
- Sieghardt Rupp as Preston
- Miha Baloh as Reverend Weler
- Renato Baldini as Judge Leader
- Terence Hill as Baker
- Louis Velle as Gordon
- Gojko Mitić as Wokadeh
- Dunja Rajter as Betsy
- Milan Srdoč as Old Wabble

== See also ==
- Karl May films
