= Dr. Fabian: Laughing Is the Best Medicine =

1969 film

- Directed by: Harald Reinl
- Written by: Franz Seitz (writer)
- Produced by: Fritz Klotsch (executive producer); Horst Wendlandt (producer)
- Starring: See below
- Cinematography: Karl Löb
- Edited by: Jutta Hering
- Music by: Martin Böttcher
- Release date: 1969
- Running time: 85 minutes
- Country: West Germany
- Language: German

Dr. Fabian: Laughing Is the Best Medicine (originally Dr. med. Fabian — Lachen ist die beste Medizin) is a 1969 West German film directed by Harald Reinl.

It was shot at the Spandau Studios in Berlin.

== Cast ==
- Hans-Joachim Kulenkampff as Dr. med. Paul Fabian
- Martin Held as Professor Felix Spalke
- Maria Perschy as Dr. Inge Vollmer
- Elisabeth Flickenschildt as Oberschwester Esmeralda
- Gisela Uhlen as Henriette Gambaroff
- Agnes Windeck as Frau Nachtigall
- Ulrike Blome as Susanne
- Arthur Richelmann as Joachim Dorn
- Monika Peitsch as Renate Lürsen
- Hubert von Meyerinck as General von Kottwitz
- Elsa Wagner as Kgl. Hoheit
- Edith Schneider as Frau Dorn
- Martin Jente as Herr Martin
- Beate Hasenau as Carla Ritter
- Hans Terofal as Furtmayer
- Otto Graf as Konsul Lürsen
- Kurd Pieritz
- Harry Tagore
