= Old Shatterhand (film) =

1964 film directed by Hugo Fregonese

- Directed by: Hugo Fregonese
- Written by: Ladislas Fodor
- Based on: Winnetou novels by Karl May
- Produced by: Artur Brauner; Georg M. Reuther
- Starring: Lex Barker; Guy Madison; Pierre Brice; Daliah Lavi; Ralf Wolter
- Cinematography: Siegfried Hold
- Edited by: Alfred Srp
- Music by: Riz Ortolani
- Production company: CCC Film
- Distributed by: Constantin Film
- Release date: 30 April 1964
- Running time: 122 minutes
- Countries: West Germany; Yugoslavia; Italy
- Languages: German; Italian; Yugoslav
- Budget: DM 5 million
- Box office: 36.1 million tickets

Old Shatterhand (known as Apaches' Last Battle in the UK) is a 1964 successful Eurowestern film directed by Hugo Fregonese, based on the character Old Shatterhand, written by German novelist Karl May and part of the Winnetou series. It is a West German CCC Film production co-produced with French, Italian and Yugoslav companies, and filmed in 70 mm. Financed with roughly DM 5,000,000, the film was the most expensive Karl May western. Composer Riz Ortolani used a chorus for his film score.

It was shot at the Spandau Studios in Berlin and on location in Croatia, including at the Plitvice Lakes National Park. The film's sets were designed by the art director Otto Pischinger.

== Plot summary ==
Killings of innocent ranchers indicate the Apaches have broken the peace treaty. Old Shatterhand, blood brother of the Apache chief Winnetou, finds out that ruthless land grabbers (aided by a few drunken Comanches they corrupted to do their biding) did the killings, hoping to start off a war between the Comanche and Apache Indians and the settlers, and follows the trail right back to the gates of the cavalry's fort.

== Background ==
After the success of director Harald Reinl's Treasure of Silver Lake (Der Schatz im Silbersee) in 1962 produced by Horst Wendlandt for Rialto Film, his rival Artur Brauner from CCC Film also wanted to have his share in this upcoming series. Since Wendlandt had acquired the rights for the original Karl May novels (although none of his films ever stuck to their respective plots), Brauner was only able to make a movie "inspired by" Karl May, using some of the already known characters portrayed by American Lex Barker as "Old Shatterhand" and Frenchman Pierre Brice as "Winnetou".

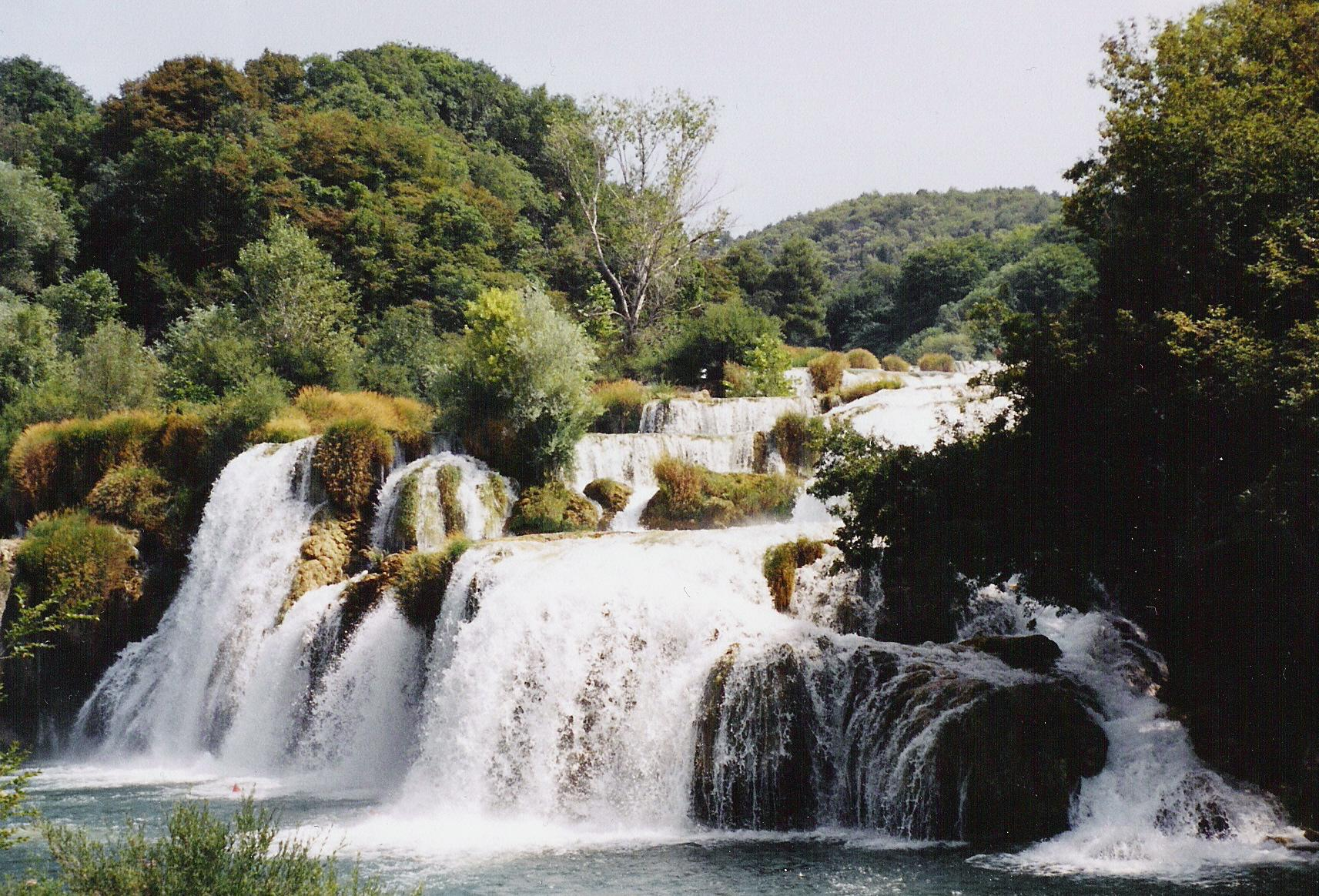
Skradinski Buk falls in Krka National Park

American Guy Madison, who had starred in the television series The Adventures of Wild Bill Hickok, played one of the bad guys, while American Bill Ramsey, one of the comic parts in this movie, was already known in Germany for his Schlager music and later jazz songs. Apart from comic relief, also some spicy scenes were added, rather unusual for Karl May movies. The French The Troops of St. Tropez had recently opened, a comedy that featured nudism that also was pioneered in Croatia. One of the "damsels in distress" characters lives at the Krka National Park waterfalls, and goes skinny dipping there. The second part of the scene was made in summer, with Israeli actress Daliah Lavi before turning to a singing career, but Lavi was sick when the initial jump from the falls was to be filmed later in the year at low water level for safer access. Thus local look-alike Gordana Ceko was hired, received make up, climbed over the slippery rocks and jumped into the cold water.

One mystery remained from the movie: today no one remembers who the original singer was of the song "Nothing To Say" (Die Stunde kam) by saloon singer Rosemarie, played by actress Kitty Mattern. It is mostly attributed to Daliah Lavi or Katyna Ranieri.

== Box office ==
In West Germany, it was the second top-grossing film of 1964, selling 7.5 million tickets. In France, it was the 52nd top-grossing film of 1965, selling 1,013,075 tickets. In the Soviet Union, the film sold 27.6 million tickets. This adds up to a total of 36,113,075 tickets sold worldwide.

== Awards ==
- Goldene Leinwand (Golden Screen) for over 3 million viewers within 12 months, presented on October 8, 1965, at Gloria-Palast cinema, Berlin.

== See also ==
- Karl May film adaptations

== Sources ==
- Bergfelder, Tim (2005) [2004]. International Adventures: German Popular Cinema and European Co-Productions in the 1960s. New York: Berghahn Books. ISBN 978-1-57181-539-2.
