= The Indian Scarf =

1963 film

- Cover of Illustrierte Film-Bühne
- Directed by: Alfred Vohrer
- Written by: Harald G. Petersson; George Hurdalek based on a play by Edgar Wallace
- Produced by: Horst Wendlandt
- Starring: Heinz Drache
- Cinematography: Karl Löb
- Edited by: Hermann Haller
- Music by: Peter Thomas
- Production companies: Rialto Film Preben Philipsen GmbH & Co. KG
- Distributed by: Constantin Film
- Release date: 13 September 1963
- Running time: 86 minutes
- Country: West Germany
- Language: German

The Indian Scarf (German: Das indische Tuch) is a 1963 West German crime film directed by Alfred Vohrer. It was part of a very successful series of German films based on the writings of Edgar Wallace and adapted from the 1931 play The Case of the Frightened Lady.

== Plot ==
After the rich Lord Lebanon has been strangled, a group of different characters assembles at Mark's Priory, his remote manor in the north of Scotland, to attend the reading of his will. However, as lawyer Frank Tanner explains—in reading a "second-to-last-will"—to the potential heirs, they will first have to stay together at the manor for six days and six nights. Thinking that Lebanon has died of heart failure, they all agree. It turns out to be a dangerous requirement as the manor is cut off from the outside world by a storm, and one by one, the visitors are murdered—strangled with an Indian scarf. In the end, of all the guests, family and staff, only Tanner, Isla Harris and Bonwit, the butler, survive. The last will is read, and it is revealed that Lord Lebanon has in fact, left all his money to the man he considered to be the greatest of the century: Edgar Wallace.

== Cast ==
- Heinz Drache as Frank Tanner
- Corny Collins as Isla Harris
- Klaus Kinski as Peter Ross
- Gisela Uhlen as Mrs. Tilling, née Lebanon
- Hans Nielsen as Mr. Tilling
- Siegfried Schürenberg as Sir Henry Hockbridge
- Richard Häussler as Dr. Amersham
- Hans Clarin as Lord Edward Lebanon
- Alexander Engel as Reverend Hastings
- Ady Berber as Chiko
- Eddi Arent as Richard Maria Bonwit
- Elisabeth Flickenschildt as Lady Emily Lebanon
- Rainer Brandt as Inspector Fuchsberger (voice) (uncredited)
- Eva Ebner as Edgar Wallace's secretary/ body in the morgue (uncredited)
- Eberhard Junkersdorf as Lord Edward Lebanon / killer with the scarf (uncredited)
- Alfred Vohrer as Edgar Wallace / Sir Henry's parrot (voice) / radio announcer(voice) (uncredited)
- Wilhelm Vorwerg as Lord Frances Percival Lebanon (uncredited)

== Production ==
Das indische Tuch was part of a series of films based on works by Edgar Wallace made in the late 1950s and 1960s by producer Horst Wendlandt for Rialto Film. The script to the film was adapted first by Georg Hurdalek and then Harald G. Petersson from an original treatment by Egon Eis, written under the pen name of Trygve Larsen, that had not found the approval of the producer. At this stage, the film was to be called Der Unheimliche. The scripts were derived from the Edgar Wallace play The Frightened Lady. There were two previous film versions based on it, both British and called The Frightened Lady, made in 1932 and 1940. Of the three, Vohrer's version was the one that deviated most from the original play. The story becomes a case of Ten Little Indians, as the protagonists are killed off one by one. Unusually for a film of the series, even leading man Heinz Drache's character comes under suspicion.

Heinz Drache was cast for this film after having starred as the hero of a very successful TV production of Francis Durbridge's The Scarf (Das Halstuch), which involved a similar modus operandi and was first aired in 1962. Several other actors, like Kinski, Arent and Schürenberg, had by that time become regulars in the film series.

The film was shot between 8 July and 13 August 1963 entirely in the Spandau Studios in West Berlin. There were no exterior shots at all. Wilhelm Vorwerk, who appears as Lord Lebanon, was not an actor, but rather the production designer at the Spandau studios. Eva Ebner was Vohrer's assistant. A final in-joke that was cut from more recent TV versions but restored for the DVD is a telephone call purporting to be from an "Inspector Fuchsberger", a reference to actor Joachim Fuchsberger, another leading man from the series of Wallace films made by Rialto.

The FSK gave the film a rating of 16 years and up and deemed it not appropriate for screenings on public holidays. It was released on 13 September 1963.

== See also ==
- The Frightened Lady (1932)
- The Case of the Frightened Lady (1940)
