= The Trace Leads to the Silver Lake =

1990 film

- Directed by: Günter Rätz
- Screenplay by: Günter Rätz
- Based on: The Treasure of Silver Lake by Karl May
- Cinematography: Rudolf Uebe
- Edited by: Sibille Rätz; Heidrun Sünderhauf
- Music by: Addy Kurth
- Release date: 16 January 1990
- Running time: 84 minutes
- Country: East Germany
- Language: German

The Trace Leads to the Silver Lake (German: Die Spur führt zum Silbersee) is a 1990 East German animated puppetoon Western film directed by Günter Rätz. It tells the story of how Old Shatterhand, with the help of Winnetou, races against bandits in search of a treasure. The film is based on the novel The Treasure of Silver Lake by Karl May. It was released on 19 January 1990. It won the 1991 Goldener Spatz for best animated film.

== Cast (voices) ==
- Gert Grasse as Old Shatterhand
- Henry Hübchen as Winnetou
- Dieter Wien as Cornel Brinkley
- Victor Deiß as Hobble-Frank
- Hans-Jürgen Hanisch as Tante Droll
- Klaus Manchen as Großer Bär
- Reinhard Michalke as Sheriff

== Production ==
Günter Rätz wrote the screenplay after Karl May's novel The Treasure of Silver Lake, originally published 1890–1891. In the novel, the main character is Old Firehand and not Old Shatterhand. The film was made with puppets and stop motion animation. It was produced by DEFA Studio für Animationsfilm in Dresden. Production began in 1985 and ended in 1989.
