= The Hunchback of Soho =

1966 film

- Original German release poster
- Directed by: Alfred Vohrer
- Written by: Edgar Wallace (story); Herbert Reinecker
- Produced by: Fritz Klotsch; Horst Wendlandt
- Starring: Günther Stoll; Pinkas Braun; Monika Peitsch
- Cinematography: Karl Löb
- Edited by: Susanne Paschen
- Music by: Peter Thomas
- Production company: Rialto Film
- Distributed by: Constantin Film
- Release date: 6 September 1966
- Running time: 89 minutes
- Country: West Germany
- Language: German

The Hunchback of Soho (German: Der Bucklige von Soho) is a 1966 West German crime film directed by Alfred Vohrer and starring Günther Stoll, Pinkas Braun and Monika Peitsch.

It was part of Rialto Film's long-running group of Edgar Wallace adaptations, and was the first in the series to be shot in Eastmancolor. It was made at the Spandau Studios and on location in Berlin and London.

== Plot ==
Scotland Yard investigate a series of murders at a castle which is now being used as a girls' school.

== Cast ==
- Günther Stoll as Inspektor Hopkins
- Monika Peitsch as Wanda Merville
- Pinkas Braun as Alan Davis
- Eddi Arent as Reverend David
- Siegfried Schürenberg as Sir John
- Agnes Windeck as Lady Marjorie Perkins
- Gisela Uhlen as Mrs. Tyndal
- Hubert von Meyerinck as General Edward Perkins
- Uta Levka as Gladys Gardner
- Suzanne Roquette as Laura
- Joachim Teege as Lawyer Harold Stone
- Hilde Sessak as Oberin
- Susanne Hsiao as Viola
- Kurt Waitzmann as Sergeant
- Ilse Pagé as Jane
- Albert Bessler as Butler Anthony
- Richard Haller as Der Bucklige

== Reception ==
Dave Sindelar from Fantastic Movie Musings and Ramblings felt that by shooting the film in color it "stripped the series of one of its strengths", also criticizing the film's first half, score, and dubbing. Andrew Pragasam from The Spinning Image awarded the film six out of ten stars, noting the film's uneven narrative, but stated that its mixture of humor and horror was still entertaining.

== Bibliography ==
- Bock, Hans-Michael & Bergfelder, Tim. The Concise CineGraph. Encyclopedia of German Cinema. Berghahn Books, 2009.
