= Blue Hand =

1925 novel by Edgar Wallace

- Author: Edgar Wallace
- Language: English
- Genre: Crime
- Publication date: 1925
- Publication place: United Kingdom
- Media type: Print

Blue Hand is a 1925 thriller novel by the British writer Edgar Wallace.

== Adaptation ==
In 1967 it was adapted into the West German film Creature with the Blue Hand, part of Rialto Film's long running series of Wallace adaptations.
