= WinneToons =

- Country of origin: Germany

Original release
- Release: January 29 – August 19, 2002

' WinneToons ' is a 26-part German cartoon series that is loosely based on characters from the novel Winnetou 1st part by Karl May. The first episode ran on March 30, 2002, on ARD. Then the episodes were repeated on the KiKA. The pilot was released on DVD by Universal. In 2009 there was a cinema adaptation with the title WinneToons - The legend of the treasure in Silbersee.

== Content ==
The individual completed episodes depict child-friendly adventure stories, without explicit depictions of violence or bloody scenes, from the time of the characters Winnetou and Old Shatterhand between their blood brotherhood and the murder of Winnetou's father Intschu Tschuna and his sister Nschotschi. All stories are fictitious and do not appear in the original novel. Many other people from the Karl May universe accompany her on her adventures, such as Hobble Frank, Aunt Droll, and Sam Hawkens.

Since the series is also marketed internationally, it was subtitled "The World of Karl May" on the DVD and the soundtrack.

Although the series was written in the USA and created by cartoonists in China, some concessions to the Japanese anime style have been incorporated into the series for the international market. Nschotschi is accompanied by two animals, fast food, a coyote, and Misty, a skunk.

Curiosity: As in the Karl May films (played by Lex Barker ), Old Shatterhand does not wear a cowboy hat in this series either.

== Music ==
The serial music was written by Adrian Askew. The title melody is a modification of "Ride the Hurricane's Eye" by the Rednex group.

== Synchronization ==
Character	Voice actor (German version)
Winnetou	Sascha Draeger
Old Shatterhand	Michael Lott
Santer	Marco Kroeger
Sam Hawkens	Wolf Rahtjen; Ralf Wolter
Nscho-chi	Celine Fontanges
Hobble Frank	Günter Lüdke
Aunt Droll	Klaus Dittmann
Matto-Sih	Thomas Schüler
Mother Thick	Beate Hasenau
Letty	Eva Michaelis
Harry Melton	Helge Liebig

== Literature ==
- Ekkehard Bartsch / Karl May: WinneToons, Karl-May-Verlag ISBN 3-7802-0911-X (picture book)

== See also ==
- List of German television series
