= Our House in Cameroon =

1961 film

- Directed by: Alfred Vohrer
- Written by: Kurt Heuser; George Hurdalek; Horst Wendlandt
- Produced by: Preben Philipsen; Horst Wendlandt
- Starring: Johanna von Koczian; Götz George; Hans Söhnker
- Cinematography: Karl Löb
- Edited by: Ira Oberberg
- Music by: Martin Böttcher
- Production company: Rialto Film
- Distributed by: Gloria Film
- Release date: 21 December 1961
- Running time: 103 minutes
- Country: West Germany
- Language: German

Our House in Cameroon (German: Unser Haus in Kamerun) is a 1961 West German adventure film directed by Alfred Vohrer and starring Johanna von Koczian, Götz George and Hans Söhnker. It was shot in Eastmancolor at the Wandsbek Studios in Hamburg. The film's sets were designed by the art directors Mathias Matthies and Ellen Schmidt.

== Cast ==
- Johanna von Koczian as Doris Kröger
- Götz George as Georg Ambrock
- Hans Söhnker as Willem Ambrock
- Horst Frank as Klaas Steensand
- Berta Drews as Tante Edith
- Walter Rilla as Konsul Steensand
- Kenneth Spencer as Bismarck
- Katrin Schaake as Christine Ambrock
- Helga Sommerfeld as Manuela Ingarides
- Hans Fitze as Pfarrer
- Uwe Friedrichsen as Rolf Ambrock
- Helga Münster as Ina Lorenz
- Henry Vahl as Taxifahrer
- Käte Jaenicke as Elli Dörfler

== Bibliography ==
- Bock, Hans-Michael & Bergfelder, Tim. The Concise CineGraph. Encyclopedia of German Cinema. Berghahn Books, 2009.
