= Old Surehand =

1965 film

- Directed by: Alfred Vohrer
- Written by: Karl May (novel); Fred Denger; Eberhard Keindorff; Johanna Sibelius
- Produced by: Wolfgang Kühnlenz; Horst Wendlandt; Erwin Gitt
- Starring: Stewart Granger; Pierre Brice; Letitia Roman
- Cinematography: Karl Löb
- Edited by: Hermann Haller
- Music by: Martin Böttcher
- Production company: Rialto Film
- Distributed by: Constantin Film
- Release date: 14 December 1965
- Running time: 90 minutes
- Countries: West Germany; Yugoslavia
- Language: German

Old Surehand (German: Old Surehand 1. Teil, also known as Flaming Frontier) is a 1965 German Western film starring Stewart Granger, Pierre Brice and Letitia Roman. The film is based on a novel by Karl May.

It was shot at the Spandau Studios and on location in Yugoslavia, including around Rijeka on the Adriatic. The film's sets were designed by the art director Vladimir Tadej.

It made $1,587,777 in Spain.

== Plot ==
Frontiersman Old Surehand (Stewart Granger) and his faithful friend Old Wabble (Milan Srdoč) are on the trail of a cold-blooded killer with the nickname 'The General' (Larry Pennell), who murdered Old Surehand's brother. On the way Old Surehand and Old Wabble are involved in the running conflict between settlers and the Comanches. Old Surehand can count on the support of his friend and blood brother Winnetou (Pierre Brice), the amiable chief of the Apaches. Bandits commanded by The General rob a train and try to put the blame on the Comanches. When the son of the Comanche chief is killed in town by a sniper, only Old Surehand and Winnetou are able to prevent a war between the Comanches and settlers.

== Cast ==
- Stewart Granger as Old Surehand
- Pierre Brice as Winnetou
- Larry Pennell as General Jack O'Neil
- Letitia Roman as Judith
- Wolfgang Lukschy as Judge Edwards
- Terence Hill as Toby Spencer
- Erik Schumann as Captain Miller
- Milan Srdoč as Old Wabble
- Velimir Bata Živojinović as Jim Potter
- Voja Mirić as Joe
- Dušan Janićijević as Clinch
- Martin Sagner as Bonoja
