= Creature with the Blue Hand =

1967 film

- Theatrical release poster
- Directed by: Alfred Vohrer
- Screenplay by: Herbert Reinecker
- Based on: The Blue Hand by Edgar Wallace
- Produced by: Horst Wendlandt
- Starring: Harald Leipnitz; Klaus Kinski; Ilse Steppat
- Cinematography: Ernst W. Kalinke
- Edited by: Jutta Hering
- Music by: Martin Böttcher
- Production company: Rialto Film
- Distributed by: Constantin Film
- Release date: 28 April 1967
- Running time: 87 minutes
- Country: West Germany

Creature with the Blue Hand (German: Die blaue Hand) is a West German horror film directed by Alfred Vohrer and starring Harald Leipnitz, Klaus Kinski and Ilse Steppat. It is based on the 1925 novel The Blue Hand by Edgar Wallace and was part of a long-running series of adaptations made by Rialto Film. The film's plot involves the police tracking a killer known as the Blue Hand. It was shot at the Spandau Studios in Berlin. The film's sets were designed by the art director Walter Kutz and Wilhelm Vorwerg.

== Cast ==
- Harald Leipnitz as Inspector Craig
- Klaus Kinski as Dave Emerson / Richard Emerson
- Carl Lange as Dr. Albert Mangrove
- Ilse Steppat as Lady Emerson
- Hermann Lenschau as Lawyer Douglas
- Diana Körner as Myrna Emerson
- Gudrun Genest as Nurse Harris
- Albert Bessler as Butler Anthony
- Richard Haller as Edward Appleton / The Blue Hand
- Ilse Pagé as Miss Mabel Finley
- Fred Haltiner as Warder Reynolds
- Peter Parten as Robert Emerson
- Thomas Danneberg as Charles Emerson
- Heinz Spitzner as Judge
- Siegfried Schürenberg as Sir John

== Release ==
Creature with the Blue Hand was released in 1967. The film was bought by New World Pictures and issued as a double feature in the United States with Beast of the Yellow Night. The film was later re-edited in 1987 with new gore inserts by producer Sam Sherman and released to home video as The Bloody Dead.

== Bibliography ==
- Bergfelder, Tim. International Adventures: German Popular Cinema and European Co-Productions in the 1960s. Berghahn Books, 2005.
