= Winnetou and Old Firehand =

1966 film

- Directed by: Alfred Vohrer
- Written by: David De Reszke; C. B. Taylor; Harald G. Petersson
- Based on: Winnetou novels by Karl May
- Produced by: Erwin Gitt; Stipe Gurdulic; Horst Wendlandt
- Starring: Pierre Brice; Rod Cameron; Marie Versini
- Cinematography: Karl Löb
- Edited by: Jutta Hering
- Music by: Peter Thomas
- Production company: Rialto Film
- Distributed by: Columbia-Bavaria Film
- Release date: 13 December 1966
- Running time: 98 minutes
- Countries: West Germany; Yugoslavia
- Language: German

Winnetou and Old Firehand (German: Winnetou und sein Freund Old Firehand) is a 1966 western film directed by Alfred Vohrer and starring Pierre Brice, Rod Cameron, and Marie Versini.

It was made as a co-production between West Germany and Yugoslavia, as part of a series of Karl May adaptations made during the decade. It was not a box-office success and only one further film was made. The film was released by Bavaria Film in Germany, and by its parent company Columbia Pictures in the United States (under the title Thunder at the Border).

It was made at the Spandau Studios in Berlin and on location in Croatia. The film's sets were designed by the art director Vladimir Tadej.

== Cast ==
- Pierre Brice as Winnetou
- Rod Cameron as Old Firehand
- Marie Versini as Nscho-tschi
- Todd Armstrong as Tom
- Harald Leipnitz as Silers
- Michèle Mercier as Nadia Gray
- Walter Wilz as Billy-Bob Silers
- Jörg Marquardt as Jace Mercier
- Rik Battaglia as Capt. Mendoza
- Viktor de Kowa as Robert Ravenhurst
- Vladimir Medar as Caleb
- Miha Baloh as Capt. Luis Sanchez Quilvera
- Aleksandar Gavric as Derks
- Dusan Antonijevic as Leon Mercier
- Ilija Ivezić as Moses
- Boris Dvornik as Pater

== Bibliography ==
- Bergfelder, Tim (2005) [2004]. International Adventures: German Popular Cinema and European Co-Productions in the 1960s. New York: Berghahn Books. ISBN 978-1-57181-539-2.
