= Veljko Maričić =

Croatian actor

- Born: 23 March 1907; Sisak, Austro Hungary
- Died: 30 October 1973 (aged 66); Rijeka, Yugoslavia
- Occupation: Actor
- Years active: 1944-1972

Veljko Maričić (23 March 1907 – 30 October 1973) was a Croatian actor. He appeared in more than fifteen films from 1944 to 1972.

== Selected filmography ==
Year	Title	Role	Notes
1965	The Desperado Trail		
1965	The Oil Prince	Bergmann	
1965	Back of the Medal		
1961	Alphabet of Fear		

== Awards ==
- Vladimir Nazor Award for theatre (1970)
