= Walt Barnes =

American football player and actor (1918–1998)

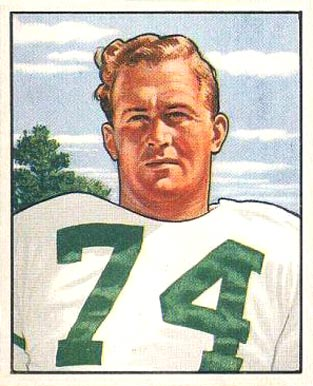
- Barnes on a 1950 Bowman football card
- Born: Walter Lee Barnes; January 26, 1918; Parkersburg, West Virginia, U.S.
- Died: January 6, 1998 (aged 79); Los Angeles, California, U.S.
- Other name: Piggy
- Education: Parkersburg High School; Louisiana State University
- Occupations: American football player, actor
- Spouse: Britta Wendel (m. 1961; div. 1968)
- Children: 2, including Lara Wendel
- Football career

No. 74
- Position: Guard

Personal information
- Listed height: 6 ft 1 in (1.85 m)
- Listed weight: 238 lb (108 kg)

Career information
- College: LSU

Career history
- Philadelphia Eagles (1948–1951)

Awards and highlights
- 2× NFL champion (1948, 1949); Pro Bowl (1950); Third-team All-American (1946); Second-team All-SEC (1946)

Career statistics
- Games played: 47
- Games started: 22
- Stats at Pro Football Reference

Walter Lee Barnes (January 26, 1918 – January 6, 1998), nicknamed Piggy, was an American professional football guard and actor who played in National Football League (NFL) for four seasons. He played in college at Louisiana State University, and in the National Football League (NFL) for the Philadelphia Eagles. He was a two-time NFL Champion (1948, 1949).

After retiring in 1951, he became a film and television actor, mainly in Westerns. During the 1960s, he worked extensively in West German and Italian cinema.

== Early life ==
Barnes was born in Parkersburg, West Virginia. He earned his nickname of "Piggy" from catching a piglet when a boy. Playing football at Parkersburg High School, he was on the unbeaten 1938 team and played in the 1939 North-South Game.

== Sports career ==
Following military service in the United States Army in World War II as a sergeant, Barnes enrolled at Louisiana State University (LSU) where he became not only a football player, but also a college weightlifting champion. Following graduation, he joined the Philadelphia Eagles football team as a guard before retiring and becoming a coach of football teams of Columbia University and Arizona State University.

While playing for the Eagles, Barnes made time to help his alma mater, LSU, by spying on the practices of the Oklahoma Sooners team prior to the 1950 Sugar Bowl. After being caught by members of the Oklahoma football staff and Biloxi, Mississippi, residents, Barnes fled to hide in the house of a former LSU teammate, Elbert Manuel. Both Barnes and Manuel refused Oklahoma coach Bud Wilkinson's offer to present themselves for identification to clear their names. The spying incident had little to do with the outcome of the game, as Oklahoma beat LSU easily, 35–0.

Barnes was inducted into the Coaches' Association Hall in June 2010.

== Acting career ==
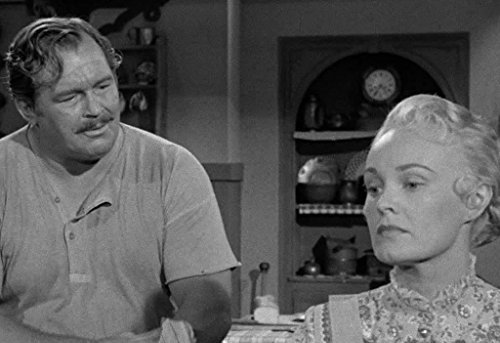
Walter Barnes with Virginia Lee in Death Valley Days (1952)

Barnes entered acting after appearing several times on The Eagles Nest, a local Philadelphia television show. WCAU television placed him on several local shows. His contacts with Walt Silver, a producer for Warner Bros. Television, led him into several appearances on television and films. Some of his more notable appearances included Bronco, Gunsmoke, Cheyenne, Bonanza, Have Gun – Will Travel-as Mason Enfield and Death Valley Days. John Wayne got him a small role as Charlie the Bartender in Rio Bravo.

Tiring of small roles and seeing opportunities overseas, Barnes was one of the many American actors who moved to Italy in the early 1960s. Kirk Douglas recommended him for a role in his The Vikings television spin-off Tales of the Vikings that was filmed for Douglas's production company in Germany. From 1960 to 1969, he was first active in pirate movies, then Karl May film adaptations and spaghetti Westerns.

Barnes returned to the United States in 1969 and appeared in more films and television series, which included The High Chaparral. His friendship with Clint Eastwood on Rawhide later led him to several roles in Eastwood's films, including Bronco Billy.

== Personal life ==
Barnes married German actress Britta Wendel in 1961. They had two children together, actress Lara Wendel (b. 1965) and child actor Michel Barnes. The couple divorced in 1968, shortly before Barnes returned to the United States.

=== Health issues and death ===
He retired from acting in 1987 and became increasingly ill due to his diabetes. He spent his final years in the Motion Picture & Television Retirement Home in Woodland Hills, Los Angeles. He died on January 6, 1998.

== Partial filmography ==
- 1957 Oregon Passage - film as Sergeant Jed Erschick
- 1957 Cheyenne - TV series as Chris Barlow
- 1957 & 1958 Gunsmoke - TV series as O’Dell & Haney
- 1958 Revolt in the Big House - film as Guard Captain Starkey
- 1958 Death Valley Days - TV as Blacksmith Gil Calvin
- 1959 Bat Masterson - TV as Mr. Paulson
- 1959 Westbound - film as Willis, Stage Depot Cook
- 1959 Rio Bravo - film as Charlie (uncredited)
- 1960 Under Ten Flags - film as Unknown
- 1960 Il carro armato dell'8 settembre - film as Unknown
- 1960 Robin Hood and the Pirates - film as Guercio / Orbo
- 1961 The Secret of the Black Falcon - film as John Rackham
- 1961 El secreto de los hombres azules - film as Matthias
- 1961 Romulus and the Sabines - film as Stilicone
- 1961 Queen of the Seas - film as Captain Poof
- 1961 Revenge of the Conquered - film as Unknown
- 1962 Avenger of the Seven Seas - film as Van Artz
- 1963 Il segno di Zorro - film as Mario
- 1963 Captain Sindbad - film as Rolf
- 1963 Slave Girls of Sheba - film as Unknown
- 1963 Apache Gold as Bill Jones
- 1964 Revenge of the Musketeers as Porthos
- 1964 Among Vultures - film as Martin Bauman Sr.
- 1965 Challenge of the Gladiator - film as Terenzo
- 1965 The Oil Prince - film as Bill Campbell
- 1965 Duel at Sundown - film as 'Old' McGow
- 1966 Winnetou and the Crossbreed - film as Mac Haller
- 1966 The Big Gundown - film as Brokston
- 1967 Clint the Stranger - film as Walter Shannon
- 1967 Target Frankie - film as Colonel O'Connor
- 1967 Love Nights in the Taiga - film as Jurij
- 1967 Halleluja for Django - film as Jarret / Clay Thomas
- 1968 The Long Day of Inspector Blomfield - film as Inspector Fred Lancaster
- 1968 Garter Colt - film as General
- 1968 The Moment to Kill - film as 'Bull'
- 1968 The Magnificent Tony Carrera - film as Barnes
- 1969 Colpo di stato - film as Unknown
- 1969–1971 Bonanza - TV as Sheriff Truslow / Weatherby / Emmett J. Whitney / Will Griner
- 1970 The Traveling Executioner - film as Sheriff
- 1971 The Christian Licorice Store - film as P.C. Stayne
- 1972 Daddy's Deadly Darling - film as Doctor
- 1972–1973 Mission: Impossible - TV as Homer Chill / Al
- 1973 High Plains Drifter - film as Sheriff Sam Shaw
- 1973 Cahill U.S. Marshal - film as Sheriff Grady
- 1975 Escape to Witch Mountain - film as Sheriff Purdy
- 1975 Mackintosh and T.J. as Jim Webster
- 1977 Emergency! - TV as Mike Gold
- 1977 Day of the Animals - film as Ranger Tucker
- 1977 Another Man, Another Chance - film as Foster
- 1977 Pete's Dragon - film as Captain
- 1978 Every Which Way but Loose - film as 'Tank' Murdock
- 1980 The Dukes of Hazzard - TV as Jeb McCobb
- 1980 Bronco Billy - film as Sheriff Dix
- 1981 Walking Tall - TV as Carl Pusser
- 1981 Smokey Bites the Dust - film as Sheriff Turner
- 1982 Father Murphy - TV as Unknown
- 1985 North and South - TV miniseries as Benny Haven
- 1986 Stingray - TV as Daniel Coleman
- 1987 Boon - TV as JCB Driver (final appearance)
