= Last of the Renegades =

1964 film

- Film poster
- Directed by: Harald Reinl
- Written by: Harald G. Petersson
- Based on: Winnetou novels by Karl May
- Produced by: Erwin Gitt; Stipe Gurdulic; Wolfgang Kühnlenz; Horst Wendlandt
- Starring: Pierre Brice; Lex Barker; Anthony Steel
- Cinematography: Ernst W. Kalinke
- Edited by: Hermann Haller
- Music by: Martin Böttcher
- Production companies: Rialto Film; Jadran Film; Société Nouvelle de Cinématographie
- Distributed by: Constantin Film
- Release date: 17 September 1964
- Running time: 94 minutes
- Countries: West Germany; France; Italy; Yugoslavia
- Language: German
- Box office: $33.8 million (est.)

Last of the Renegades (German: Winnetou – 2. Teil and also known as Winnetou: Last of the Renegades) is a 1964 German-Italian Western film directed by Harald Reinl and starring Pierre Brice, Lex Barker, and Anthony Steel. It is based on a Karl May novel, and was part of a series of adaptations produced by Rialto Film. The film is a sequel to Apache Gold.

== Plot ==
During a ride to the tribe of the Assiniboin Indians, Winnetou is able to save the chief's daughter Ribanna from a bear attack. Out of gratitude, her father releases three previously captured soldiers from torture stakes at Winnetou's request. Among the soldiers is Lieutenant Robert Merril, the son of the commander of Fort Niobrara. He is supposed to convey Winnetou's message to his father that Indians of all tribes want to meet at the fort to negotiate a lasting peace with the whites.

The three soldiers witness how Bud Forrester and his gang raids a village of the Ponca Indians because there are oil deposits on their land. Six of the bandits pursue them with the order to kill. By chance, Old Shatterhand and Gunstick appear and rescue the unarmed soldiers.

In the Assiniboin Indian camp, Winnetou and Ribanna become closer and fall in love.

Old Shatterhand goes with the adventure-seeking Lord Castlepool to New Venango, the headquarters of the bandit Forrester. They are threatened, then separated from their horses and arrested. In captivity, Old Shatterhand conspires with the workers there to destroy the oil warehouse and set all of them free. It is set on fire by the surviving Ponca chief. Forrester uses the burning oil against the workers, many of whom lose their limbs; Old Shatterhand and Lord Castlepool are able to save themselves.

A meeting occurs at Fort Niobrara between the United States Army and the heads of all of the Indian tribes attempt to negotiate. However all express desire for war given past atrocities committed against their people by the Americans. Suddenly, Lieutenant Merril expresses the idea of taking Ribanna as his wife for the sake of peace, instantly causing all of the warhawks to change their minds. Winnetou is shocked, but sacrifices his love for Ribanna for peace. Forrester and his men stage a false flag attack on a settler trek and blame it on the Assiniboin.

When Old Shatterhand, Lord Castlepool and Winnetou visit the site of the raid on the trek, they are discovered by Forrester and his gang and besieged in a hollow. Their guerilla tactics successfully kill many of the gang members, disrupting their attacks. They successfully leave the site.

Meanwhile, David Luca, Forrester's henchman, pretends to be the last survivor of the trek to the soldiers at Fort Niobrara; the commander then sends some soldiers to the scene of the attack. Merril, a civilian after the wedding, secretly hands Luca over to the Assiniboin. Old Shatterhand meets the soldiers sent out and puts them on the trail of the gang.

Luca is able to incapacitate his guards and warn Forrester that the Assiniboin are waiting for him in New Venango. Forrester, who can no longer get to the supplies there, follows Luca's plan, who has noticed that the Indians' wives and children are in a cave with the newlywed couple. There, Forrester takes Ribanna and Merril hostage. He demands that the soldiers who have arrived with Old Shatterhand withdraw and provide them provisions so they can advance freely to the Mexican border, otherwise he will kill the couple.

Time runs out for the Army to provide them supplies and a battle ensues. Winnetou and his tribal battalion arrives and assists the Army, allowing them to subjugate the gang.

Winnetou manages to swim with Assiniboin warriors through an underground tributary into the cave and free Merril and Ribanna; Forrester, as the last survivor of the bandits, is apparently allowed to escape from the cave before he dies by Indian arrows. Peace having been saved, Winnetou and Old Shatterhand ride towards new adventures.

== Cast ==
- Pierre Brice as Winnetou
- Lex Barker as Old Shatterhand
- Anthony Steel as Bud Forrester
- Karin Dor as Ribanna
- Klaus Kinski as David 'Luke' Lucas
- Renato Baldini as Col. J. F. Merril
- Terence Hill as Lt. Robert Merril
- Marie-Noëlle Barre as Susan Merril
- Ilija Ivezić as Red (as Elija Ivejic)
- Velemir Chytil as Carter
- Stole Arandjelovic as Caesar
- Djordje Nenadovic as Capt. Bruce
- Mirko Boman as Gunstick Uncle
- Rikard Brzeska as Tah-Sha-Tunga
- Eddi Arent as Lord Castlepool
- Gojko Mitić as White Raven

== Production ==
The film was shot at the Spandau Studios in Berlin and on location in Croatia. Its sets were designed by the art director Vladimir Tadej.

It was one of a number of films Anthony Steel made in Europe.

== Box office ==
In West Germany, it was the fourth top-grossing film of 1964, selling 6.75 million tickets and grossing €7,462,100 ($7.82 million).

In the Soviet Union, the film sold 56 million tickets in 1975, equivalent to an estimated $26 million in gross revenue.

This adds up to a total of 62.75 million tickets sold worldwide, grossing an estimated $33.8 million in worldwide revenue.

== See also ==
- Karl May film adaptations
- Klaus Kinski filmography

== Bibliography ==
- Bergfelder, Tim (2005) [2004]. International Adventures: German Popular Cinema and European Co-Productions in the 1960s. New York: Berghahn Books. ISBN 978-1-57181-539-2.
