= The Shoot (film) =

- Directed by: Robert Siodmak
- Written by: Karl May (novel); Georg Marischka; Robert Siodmak
- Produced by: Artur Brauner; Götz Dieter Wulf; Heinz Willeg
- Starring: Lex Barker; Marie Versini; Ralf Wolter
- Cinematography: Aleksandar Sekulovic
- Edited by: Ursula Kahlbaum
- Music by: Martin Böttcher
- Production companies: CCC Film; Serena Film; Criterion Film; Avala Film; Hoche Productions; Regina Film
- Distributed by: Gloria Film
- Release date: 20 August 1964
- Running time: 118 minutes
- Countries: West Germany; France; Italy; Yugoslavia
- Language: German

The Shoot (German: Der Schut) is a 1964 adventure film directed by Robert Siodmak and starring Lex Barker, Marie Versini and Ralf Wolter. It was made as a co-production between West Germany, France, Italy and Yugoslavia. It is based on the 1892 novel of the same title by Karl May, and was part of a string of adaptations of his work started by Rialto Film's series of western films. It was a commercial success, benefiting from the presence of Barker and Versini who were stars of Rialto's series.

It was shot at the Tempelhof and Spandau Studios in West Berlin and on location in Kosovo and Montenegro then part of Yugoslavia. The film's sets were designed by the art director Dragoljub Ivkov. It was shot in Eastmancolor.

== Synopsis ==
In the Balkans, then part of the Ottoman Empire, two travellers assist in the battle against a notorious bandit who has kidnapped a French engineer.

== Cast ==
- Lex Barker as Kara Ben Nemsi
- Marie Versini as Tschita
- Ralf Wolter as Hadschi Halef Omar
- Rik Battaglia as Nirwan/Der Schut
- Marianne Hold as Annette Galingré
- Maria Grazia Francia as Frau des Schut
- Friedrich von Ledebur as Mübarek
- Renato Baldini as Barud
- Pierre Fromont as Henry Galingré
- Olga Brajevic as Madame Pouillet
- Eva Ras as Nebatja
- Nikola Popovic as Imer
- Jovan Janicijevic-Burdus as Manach
- Dusan Perkovic as Aladschy Bybar
- Dusan Janicijevic as Omar Ben Sadek
- Dieter Borsche as Sir David Lindsay
- Chris Howland as Archibald
- Dusan Antonijevic as Bandit
- Zivojin Denic as Aladschy Sandar
- Inge Landgut as Annette Galingré
- Alessandra Panaro as Frau des Schut
- Aleksandar Stojkovic as Smith
- Jovisa Vojinovic as Kodscha Bascha
- Janez Vrhovec as Osko

== Bibliography ==
- Bergfelder, Tim. International Adventures: German Popular Cinema and European Co-Productions in the 1960s. Berghahn Books, 2005.
- Goble, Alan. The Complete Index to Literary Sources in Film. Walter de Gruyter, 1999.
