= Eddi Arent =

German actor (1925–2013)

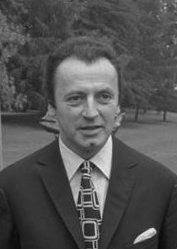
- Arent in 1971
- Born: Gebhardt Georg Arendt; 5 May 1925; Danzig, Free City of Danzig (present-day Gdańsk, Poland)
- Died: 28 May 2013 (aged 88); Munich, Germany
- Occupation: Actor
- Years active: 1947–2002

Gebhardt Georg “Eddi” Arendt (5 May 1925 – 28 May 2013) was a German actor, cabaret artist and comedian. He appeared in more than 100 films between 1956 and 2002. He was born in Danzig, Free City of Danzig (present-day Gdańsk, Poland) and died in Munich, Germany, aged 88 from Alzheimer's disease.

== Partial filmography ==
- It Was Always So Nice With You (1954) - Peters Begleiter in Hafenbar (uncredited)
- The Model Husband (1956)
- The Doctor of Stalingrad (1958) - Lagerinsasse
- Das haut einen Seemann doch nicht um (1958)
- Der Sündenbock von Spatzenhausen (1958) - Leopold Lugauer
- Kleine Leute mal ganz groß (1958) - Alois Knopf
- Mikosch of the Secret Service (1959) - Major Claus Dieter Graf Schnackewitz
- Paprika (1959)
- Der Frosch mit der Maske (1959) - James
- A Summer You Will Never Forget (1959) - Ruprecht
- The Crimson Circle (1960) - Sgt. Haggett
- Schlagerparade 1960 (1960) - Dixi Dolant
- The Terrible People (1960) - Antony Edwards
- Gustav Adolf's Page (1960) - Anton Leublfing
- The Green Archer (1961) - Spike Holland
- Schlagerparade 1961 (1961) - Dixie Dolan
- The Dead Eyes of London (1961) - Sergeant / Inspektor S. "Sunny" Harvey
- The Forger of London (1961) - Nachbar Stone / Organist Miller
- Musik ist Trumpf (1961) - Manager Nicky
- The Strange Countess (1961) - Lord Selwyn 'Selly' Moron
- So liebt und küsst man in Tirol (1961) - Graf Hasso Steinbach
- The Puzzle of the Red Orchid (1962) - Parker
- The Door with Seven Locks (1962) - Kriminalassistent Holms
- When the Music Plays at Wörthersee (1962) - Eddy Kummer
- The Inn on the River (1962) - Barnaby
- Treasure of Silver Lake (1962) - Lord Castlepool
- The Curse of the Yellow Snake (1963) - Samuel Carter
- The Squeaker (1963) - Josua 'Jos' Harras
- The Black Abbot (1963) - Horatio W. Smith
- The Indian Scarf (1963) - Richard Maria Bonwit
- The Secret of the Black Widow (1963) - Fish
- Room 13 (1964) - Dr. Higgins
- The Curse of the Hidden Vault (1964) - Ferry Westlake
- Der Hexer (1964) - Archibald Finch
- Last of the Renegades (1964) - Lord Castlepool
- Traitor's Gate (1964) - Hector
- Neues vom Hexer (1965) - Archibald Finch
- The Sinister Monk (1965) - Smith
- The Fountain of Love (1966) - Alwin Knobbe
- Circus of Fear (1966) - Eddie
- The Hunchback of Soho (1966) - Reverend David
- Maigret and His Greatest Case (1966) - François Labas
- The Trygon Factor (1966) - Emil Clossen
- Spy Today, Die Tomorrow (1967) - Prof. Strahlmann
- Target Frankie (1967) - Kaiser
- The Long Day of Inspector Blomfield (1968) - Sgt. Harry Colman
- The Valley of Death (1968) - Lord Castlepool
- Das Go-Go-Girl vom Blow-Up (1969) - Dr. Adler
- Help, I Love Twins (1969) - Mr. Brown
- The Sex Nest (1970) - Majordomus alias Paganini
- Hurra, unsere Eltern sind nicht da (1970) - Hausmeister Gustav
- When You're With Me (1970) - Tobby Kirsch
- Nachbarn sind zum Ärgern da (1970) - Amtsrat Ernst Springbock
- Who Laughs Last, Laughs Best (1971) - Archibald Krüglein
- Hilfe, die Verwandten kommen (1971)
- Kompanie der Knallköppe (1971) - Adam Kahlfuß
- Kinderarzt Dr. Fröhlich (1972) - Moritz Morris
- Always Trouble with the Reverend (1972) - Punchen
- The Heath Is Green (1972) - Herr Locher
- Blue Blooms the Gentian (1973) - Dr. Überlein
- Old Barge, Young Love (1973) - Eugen Quandt
- Das Wandern ist Herrn Müllers Lust (1973) - Dr. Schön
- Unsere Tante ist das Letzte (1973) - Otto-Wilhelm Hirsekorn
- Opération Lady Marlène (1975) - Simson
- The Secret Carrier (1975) - Weisbach
- Lady Dracula (1977) - Eddie
- Himmel, Scheich und Wolkenbruch (1979) - Professor Ewald Ziebiz
- Keiner hat das Pferd geküßt (1980) - Eddi
- Harry and Harriet (1990) - Psychiatrist
- My Mother's Courage (1995) - Klapka
- Manila (2000) - Eddi
