= The Desperado Trail =

1965 West German film

- Directed by: Harald Reinl
- Written by: J. Joachim Bartsch; Harald G. Petersson
- Based on: Winnetou novels by Karl May
- Produced by: Horst Wendlandt
- Starring: Lex Barker; Pierre Brice
- Cinematography: Ernst W. Kalinke
- Edited by: Jutta Hering
- Music by: Martin Böttcher
- Distributed by: Constantin Film (West Germany); Columbia Pictures (United States)
- Release dates: 15 October 1965 (West Germany); 1968 (United States)
- Running time: 93 minutes
- Country: West Germany
- Language: German

The Desperado Trail (German: Winnetou – 3. Teil) is a 1965 West German film directed by Harald Reinl.

== Plot ==
Greedy businessmen led by the unscrupulous Vermeulen have scoundrels hunt bison on Indian territory in order to provoke a conflict with the Mescalero Apaches. But their chief Winnetou remains level-headed, seizing their weapons but allowing them to escape.

On the other hand, White Buffalo, leader of the Jicarilla Apaches, can be persuaded by alcohol and weapons deliveries to reclaim land already ceded to the Indians from the government. Winnetou and Old Shatterhand report this to the governor in Santa Fe, who assures White Buffalo more land and impunity if he cooperates with the government.

Businessmen in town hear of this through an informer at the governor's office. They have a henchman blast a rock at the quarry just as the blood brothers ride past below. Sensing danger and stopping right before the explosion, the two play dead leading the henchman to flee the scene. Old Shatterhand follows him into town and tracks him down to the businessmen's party. Old Shatterhand disables Vermeulen's henchmen, learns about the plan and rides after Winnetou.

The unmasked mastermind has a telegraph sent to the town of Clinton, which is on Winnetou's way. There, the bandit leader Rollins receives the message to stop Winnetou.

Thanks to his horse Iltschi, he is able to escape both Rollins' first ambush and, with the effort and help of Old Shatterhand, the second ambush. Immediately afterwards, the blood brothers are surrounded by the Jicarillas and warn in their camp not to let themselves be stirred up by the profiteers to fight for their ceded land.

White Buffalo wants to hear his son Swift Panther, but he is killed by Rollins after stabbing him with Winnetou's knife left behind while fighting the bandits. White Buffalo believes Rollins, who pretends to be a witness stating that Winnetou killed his son. But Sam Hawkens is able to free the blood brothers from the torture stake of the Indians seeking revenge with a display of fireworks and telegraphs Old Shatterhand from Clinton to the governor for help. He has Vermeulen arrested.

The Jicarillas, together with the bandits, pursue the Mescalero tribe retreating into the mountains for nine days until they reach it. Old Shatterhand appeals for peace one last time when the cavalry from Santa Fe finally arrives, wanting to warn him, leaving his cover, to ride into the bandits' rifles. Rollins, who has sneaked up the rocks, uses this to shoot Old Shatterhand. Winnetou throws himself into the path of the projectile, and is fatally wounded. Rollins is executed by spears of the Mescaleros.

Winnetou's bullet is too close to his heart and cannot be removed. Old Shatterhand reminisces on the adventures they have shared as Winnetou dies in his arms.

== Cast ==
- Lex Barker as Old Shatterhand
- Pierre Brice as Winnetou
- Rik Battaglia as Rollins
- Ralf Wolter as Sam Hawkens
- Carl Lange as Gouverneur
- Miha Baloh as Gomez
- Dušan Antonijević as Weißer Büffel [White Buffalo]
- Aleksandar Gavrić as Kid
- Ilija Ivezić as Clark
- Veljko Maričić as Vermeulen
- Slobodan Dimitrijević as Schneller Panther [Quick Panther]
- Sophie Hardy as Ann

== See also ==
- Karl May film adaptations
