= Mirko Boman =

Croatian actor

- Born: 11 December 1926; Zagreb, Yugoslavia
- Died: 30 August 2013 (aged 86); Zagreb, Croatia
- Occupation: Actor
- Years active: 1959-2002

Mirko Boman (11 December 1926 – 30 August 2013) was a Croatian actor. He appeared in more than fifty films from 1959 to 2002.

== Selected filmography ==
Year	Title	Role	Notes
1960	Slave of Rome	Theod	
1962	Treasure of Silver Lake	Gunstick Uncle	
1964	Last of the Renegades	Gunstick Uncle	
1966	The One Eyed Soldiers	The Mute	
1969	When You Hear the Bells	Partizan	
1969	The Ravine	The Tall Soldier	
1976	The Rat Savior	Employee	
