= Old Shatterhand =

Fictional character

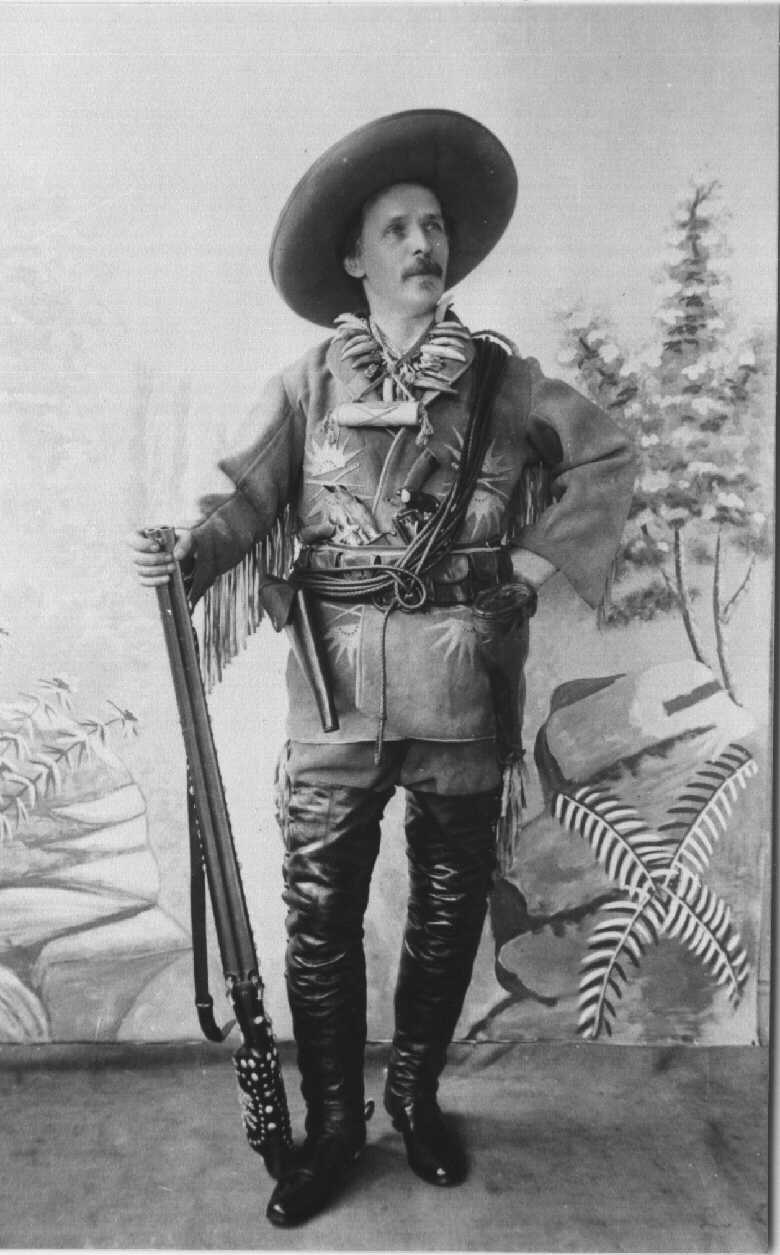
- Karl May as Old Shatterhand, in an 1896 photograph by Alois Schiesser
- Created by: Karl May
- Portrayed by: Karl May

In-universe information
- Gender: Male
- Nationality: German

Old Shatterhand is a fictional character in Western novels by German writer Karl May (1842–1912). He is the German friend and blood brother of Winnetou, the fictional chief of the Mescalero tribe of the Apache. He is the main character in the Eurowestern by the same name from 1964, starring Lex Barker, as well as in six more films of the Winnetou film series.

== Characterisation ==
Old Shatterhand is the alter ego of Karl May, and May himself maintained that he experienced all the adventures in person, even though in fact he did not visit America until after he wrote most of his well-known Western stories, and never traveled west of Buffalo, New York. Most of the stories are written from a first person perspective, and Winnetou often calls Old Shatterhand my brother Scharli ('Scharli' being a German phonetic approximation of 'Charlie', and ultimately meaning Karl in German). May also wrote stories about the same character traveling the Orient, where he is known as Kara Ben Nemsi.

May attached the prefix Old to the names of several of his characters, considering it to be typically American and a sign of the characters' great experience. In the stories, Old Shatterhand is given the name by his friend Sam Hawkens (who also originates from Germany but is already an old-timer in the American West), as Old Shatterhand was able to knock his opponents unconscious with a single punch from his fist aimed at the head (specifically the temple).

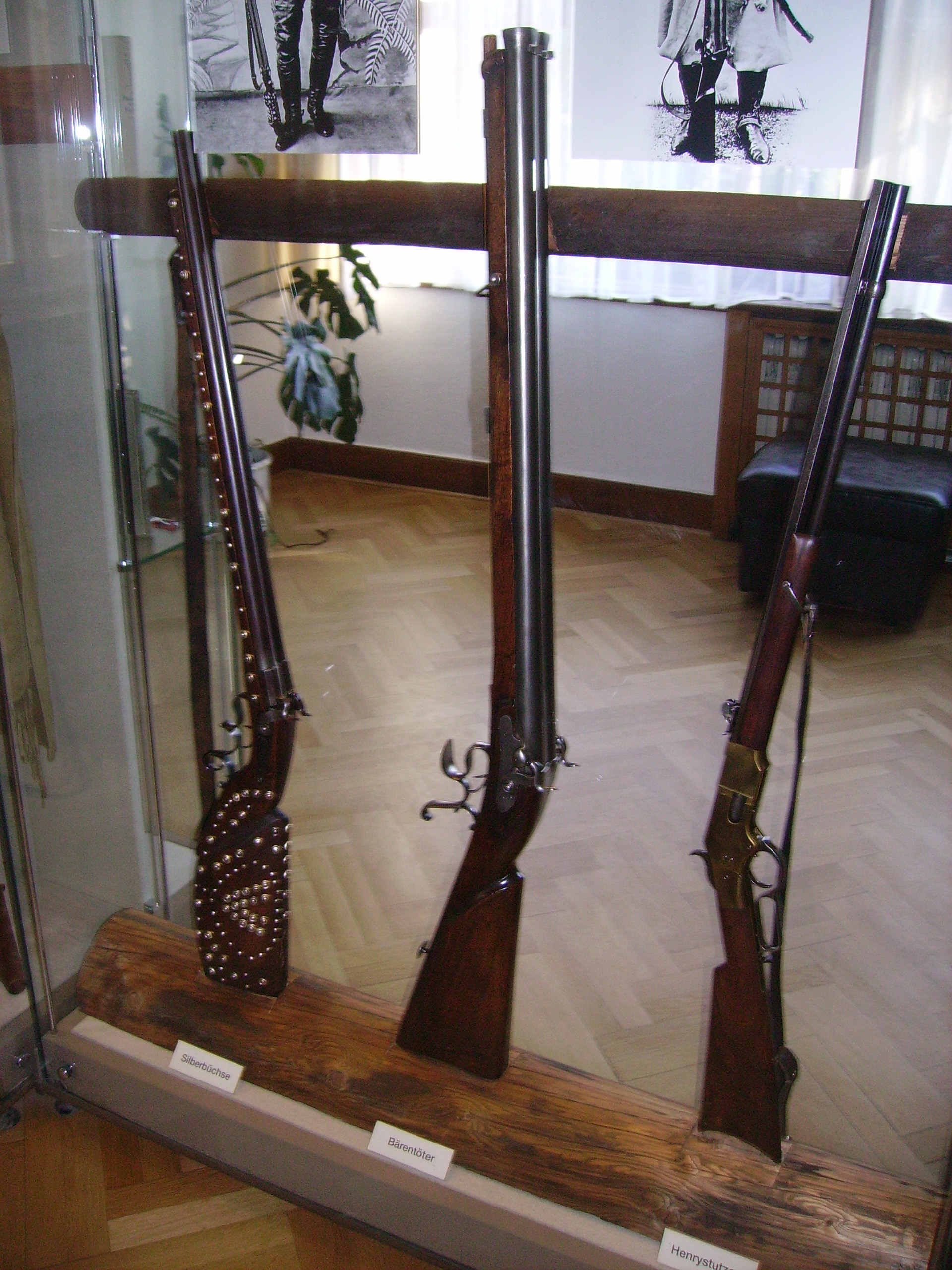
Bärentöter (center), the Henrystutzen (right) and the Silberbüchse (left), in the Karl May Museum.

Old Shatterhand owns two famous rifles, the Bärentöter (Bear Killer) and the Henrystutzen (Henry carbine), both made by a fictional gunsmith called Henry in St. Louis (based on gunsmith Benjamin Tyler Henry 1821–1898). The Henrystutzen was able to fire 25 shots without reloading, probably a hyperbolic reference to the Henry rifle. Old Shatterhand rode a horse called Hatatitla (Lightning), which he got from Winnetou, who rode the horse's brother, called Iltschi (meaning Wind).

The tales may have been an influence on the creation of the Lone Ranger media franchise. Christian Tramitz parodied Shatterhand as a character called Ranger in the "Apahachi and Ranger" sketches for Michael Herbig's comedy show Bullyparade and their cinematic adaptation Der Schuh des Manitu.

== Original German Old Shatterhand stories ==
=== Travel stories ===
- Deadly Dust (1880, later revised for Winnetou III)
- Ein Oelbrand (1882/83)
- Im »wilden Westen« Nordamerika's (1882/83, later revised for Winnetou III)
- Winnetou I (1893, temporarily also entitled as Winnetou der Rote Gentleman I)
- Winnetou II (1893, temporarily also entitled as Winnetou der Rote Gentleman II)
- Winnetou III (1893, temporarily also entitled as Winnetou der Rote Gentleman III)
- Old Surehand I (1894)
- Old Surehand II (1895)
- Old Surehand III (1896)
- Satan und Ischariot I (1896)
- Satan und Ischariot II (1897)
- Satan und Ischariot III (1897)
- Gott läßt sich nicht spotten (within Auf fremden Pfaden, 1897)
- Ein Blizzard (within Auf fremden Pfaden, 1897)
- Mutterliebe (1897/98)
- „Weihnacht!“ (1897)
- Im Reiche des silbernen Löwen I (1898)
- Winnetou IV (1910)

In some early stories (Old Firehand (1875), Im fernen Westen (1879), Der Scout (1888/89)) there is an anonymous first-person narrator, who was changed to Old Shatterhand during revision for compiling Winnetou II.

=== Stories for youth ===
- Unter der Windhose (1886, later also included in Old Surehand II)
- Der Sohn des Bärenjägers (1887; from 1890 included in Die Helden des Westens)
- Der Geist des Llano estakado (1888; from 1890 included in Die Helden des Westens)
- Der Schatz im Silbersee (1890/91)
- Der Oelprinz (1893/94)
- Der schwarze Mustang (1896/97)

=== Further mentions ===
- In Unter Würgern (1879, since 1893 as Die Gum in Orangen und Datteln), a story set in the Orient, the name Old Shatterhand appeared for the first time: the otherwise anonymous first-person narrator mentions casually that this name was given to him in the Plains.
- In the chapter An der Tigerbrücke directly written for the omnibus edition Am Stillen Ocean (1894) the first-person narrator called Charley indicates his identity with Kara Ben Nemsi and Old Shatterhand.
- In the story Im Reiche des silbernen Löwen IV (1903) Kara Ben Nemsi says once he was Old Shatterhand.

== Movies ==
The character of Old Shatterhand was played in the German Karl May movies of the 1960s by American actor Lex Barker.

- Der Schatz im Silbersee (Treasure of Silver Lake) (1962), dir.: Dr. Harald Reinl
- Winnetou 1. Teil (Apache Gold) (1963), dir.: Dr. Harald Reinl
- Old Shatterhand (Apaches Last Battle) (1964), dir.: Hugo Fregonese
- Winnetou – 2. Teil (Last of the Renegades) (1964), dir.: Dr. Harald Reinl
- Winnetou – 3. Teil (The Desperado Trail) (1965), dir.: Dr. Harald Reinl
- Winnetou und das Halbblut Apanatschi (Winnetou and the Crossbreed) (1966), dir.: Harald Philipp
- Winnetou und Shatterhand im Tal der Toten (The Valley of Death) (1968), dir.: Dr. Harald Reinl

In contrast to the stories in the movies Unter Geiern (1964) and Der Ölprinz (1965) Old Surehand (starring Stewart Granger) was the hero instead of Old Shatterhand. Old Surehand is another character created by Karl May, who wrote three books featuring the character. Old Surehand, like Old Shatterhand, is a renowned Western hero and best friends with the Native Americans. Unlike Old Shatterhand, Old Surehand is a half-blood Native himself, though raised in a white family.

== English translations of Karl May's works ==
- Karl May's works have been translated by Marlies Bugmann
- Nemsi Books (Publisher of new unabridged translations)

== Sequels ==
In the 1990s British writer B. J. Holmes produced two sequels featuring the character: A Legend Called Shatterhand, and Shatterhand and the People.
