= Rik Battaglia =

Italian actor (1927–2015)

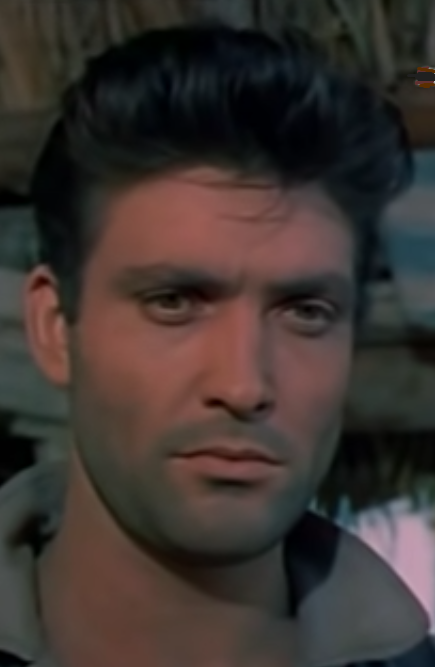
- Battaglia in The River Girl (1954)
- Born: Caterino Bertaglia; 18 February 1927; Corbola, Rovigo, Veneto, Kingdom of Italy
- Died: 27 March 2015 (aged 88); Corbola, Veneto, Italy
- Occupation: Actor
- Years active: 1954–1999

Caterino Bertaglia (18 February 1927 – 27 March 2015), known professionally as Rik Battaglia, was an Italian film actor.

== Career ==
Battaglia appeared in a number of historical and peplum films, such as The Mighty Crusaders (1958, Carlo Ludovico Bragaglia), Hannibal (1959, Carlo Ludovico Bragaglia, Edgar G. Ulmer), Caesar the Conqueror (1962, Tanio Boccia), and A Queen for Caesar (1962, Piero Pierotti). He was also seen in the Hollywood adventure Raw Wind in Eden (1958, Richard Wilson). He also played in Esther and the King (1960), From a Roman Balcony (1960, by Mauro Bolognini) and in the biblical epic Sodom and Gomorrah (1962, by Robert Aldrich).

Battaglia appeared in adventure films such as Attack of the Moors (1959, Mario Costa), The Conqueror of the Orient (1960, Tanio Boccia), The Lion of St. Mark (1963, Luigi Capuano) and Sandokan the Great (1963, Umberto Lenzi), and horror films such as Nightmare Castle (1965, Mario Caiano).

He became a regular in the Karl May films, and in Spaghetti Westerns and adventure films. Some of these included Old Shatterhand (1963), The Pyramid of the Sun God (1965), Legacy of the Incas (1965), Winnetou and Old Firehand (1966), Black Jack (1968), The Valley of Death (1968), Duck, You Sucker! (1971), The Call of the Wild (1972), White Fang (1973), Challenge to White Fang (1974) and A Man Called Blade (1977). His other films included 'Tis Pity She's a Whore (1971), Treasure Island (1972, as Captain Smollett), the Agatha Christie adaptation Ten Little Indians (1974), the Sergio Leone co-produced western A Genius, Two Partners and a Dupe (1975), and Vincente Minnelli's A Matter of Time (1976). Battaglia also appeared in Deported Women of the SS Special Section (1976), Sister Emanuelle (1977), I Am the Law (1977), Return of the 38 Gang (1977), Zappatore (1980) and Don Bosco (1988). His last feature film was Buck ai confini del cielo (1991) he retired from films in 1999.

== Selected filmography ==
- The River Girl (1954) - Gino Lodi
- Rice Girl (1956) - Gianni
- Liane, Jungle Goddess (1956) - Crewman (uncredited)
- Roland the Mighty (1956) - Roland
- Engaged to Death (1957) - Carlo
- Nature Girl and the Slaver (1957) - Ibrahim
- The Mighty Crusaders (1958) - Rinaldo d'Este
- Raw Wind in Eden (1958) - Gavino
- Adorabili e bugiarde (1958) - Giorgio Pitagora
- Nackt wie Gott sie schuf (1958) - Joschi Türk
- Prisoner of the Volga (1959) - Lt. Lisenko
- Caterina Sforza, la leonessa di Romagna (1959)
- Attack of the Moors (1959) - Roland, Count of Besançon
- Hannibal (1959) - Hasdrubal
- The Conqueror of the Orient (1960) - Nadir
- From a Roman Balcony (1960) - Carpiti
- Esther and the King (1960) - Simon
- Minotaur, the Wild Beast of Crete (1960) - Demetrio
- Don't Bother to Knock (1961) - Giulio
- Caesar the Conqueror (1962) - Vercingetorix
- Sodom and Gomorrah (1962) - Melchior
- A Queen for Caesar (1962) - Lucius Septimius
- Rocambole (1963) - Conrad von Berthold
- The Lion of St. Mark (1963) - Jandolo
- Sandokan the Great (1963) - Sambigliong
- Son of the Circus (1963) - Steffi
- Old Shatterhand (1964) - Dixon
- The Shoot (1964) - Nirwan
- Freddy in the Wild West (1964) - Steve Perkins
- The Treasure of the Aztecs (1965) - Capt. Lazoro Verdoja
- The Pyramid of the Sun God (1965) - Captain Lazaro Verdoja
- The Adventurer of Tortuga (1965) - Pedro Valverde
- Nightmare Castle (1965) - David
- Legacy of the Incas (1965) - Antonio Perillo
- The Desperado Trail (1965) - Rollins
- Winnetou and Old Firehand (1966) - Capt. Mendoza
- Bitter Fruit (1967) - Sebastian
- Target Frankie (1967) - Drummer
- Long Days of Hate (1968) - Vic Graham
- Radhapura - Endstation der Verdammten (1968) - Manuel
- The Longest Hunt (1968) - Capt. Norton
- Black Jack (1968) - Skinner
- The Valley of Death (1968) - Murdock
- La battaglia del deserto (1969) - Bob
- Chapaqua's Gold (1970) - Murphy
- Hey Amigo! A Toast to Your Death (1970) - Barnett
- La grande scrofa nera (1971)
- 'Tis Pity She's a Whore (1971) - Mercante
- Duck, You Sucker! (1971) - Santerna
- Deadly Trackers (1972) - Montana
- Treasure Island (1972) - Captain Smollett
- The Call of the Wild (1972) - Dutch Harry
- Canterbury n° 2 - Nuove storie d'amore del '300 (1973) - Averagus
- La isla misteriosa y el capitán Nemo (1973) - Finch
- White Fang (1973) - Jim Hall
- Ten Little Indians (1974) - Vendedor
- Legend of the Sea Wolf (1975)
- A Genius, Two Partners and a Dupe (1975) - Captain
- Blue Belle (1976) - Superintendent
- Una vita venduta (1976)
- A Matter of Time (1976) - Nina's Father
- Deported Women of the SS Special Section (1976) - Dr. Schubert
- Il mondo dei sensi di Emy Wong (1977)
- Sister Emanuelle (1977) - Catsabriaga
- Mannaja (1977) - Gerald Merton
- I Am the Law (1977) - Antonio Capecelatro
- Return of the 38 Gang (1977) - Police Commissioner
- The Greatest Battle (1978) - French Partisan
- The New Godfathers (1979) - Don Calogero Avallone
- Napoli... la camorra sfida, la città risponde (1979) - Dott. Rampone
- Lo scugnizzo (1979)
- Zappatore (1980) - Don Andrea Amitrano
- La tua vita per mio figlio (1980) - Don Calogero
- Bomber (1982)
- Giuramento (1982) - Frank Geraci
- Liberté, égalité, choucroute (1985) - De La Fayette
- White Slave (1985) - Catherine's Father (uncredited)
- Il pentito (1985)
- Detective School Dropouts (1986) - Don Zanetti
- Giuro che ti amo (1986)
- Don Bosco (1988) - Michele Cavour
- La ragazza del metrò (1989) - Andrea
- Diva Futura - L'avventura dell'amore (1989)
- Omicidio a luci blu (1991) - Bill
- Buck ai confini del cielo (1991) - Bauman
- Rodjen kao ratnik (1994) - Bogie
