= The Oil Prince =

1965 film

- Directed by: Harald Philipp
- Written by: Fred Denger; Harald Philipp
- Based on: The Oil Prince by Karl May
- Produced by: Erwin Gitt; Stipe Gurdulic; Horst Wendlandt
- Starring: Stewart Granger; Pierre Brice; Harald Leipnitz; Macha Méril
- Cinematography: Heinz Hölscher
- Music by: Martin Böttcher
- Production companies: Rialto Film; Jadran Film
- Distributed by: Constantin Film; Columbia Pictures (UK)
- Release date: 25 August 1965
- Running time: 89 minutes
- Countries: West Germany; Yugoslavia
- Language: German

The Oil Prince (German: Der Ölprinz) is a 1965 West German-Yugoslav western film directed by Harald Philipp and starring Stewart Granger, Pierre Brice and Harald Leipnitz. It was also known as Rampage at Apache Wells. The screenplay is based on a novel by Karl May and was one of a series of film adaptations of his work made by Rialto Film.

The film was shot at the Spandau Studios in Berlin and on location in Yugoslavia. The film's sets were designed by the art director Dusan Jericevic.

It recorded admissions of 409,817 in France, 1,449,558 in Spain, and over 3 million in Germany.

== Cast ==
- Stewart Granger as Old Surehand
- Pierre Brice as Winnetou
- Harald Leipnitz as The Oil Prince
- Macha Méril as Lizzy
- Terence Hill as Richard Forsythe
- Walt Barnes as Bill Campbell
- Antje Weisgerber as Mrs. Ebersbach
- Heinz Erhardt as Cantor Hampel
- Milan Srdoč as Old Wabble
- Gerd Frickhöffer as Kovacz
- Veljko Maričić as Bergmann
- Dušan Janićijević as Butler
- Slobodan Dimitrijević as Knife
- Davor Antolić as Paddy
- Zvonimir Črnko as Billy Forner

== Bibliography ==
- Bergfelder, Tim. International Adventures: German Popular Cinema and European Co-Productions in the 1960s. Berghahn Books, 2005.
