= The Long Day of Inspector Blomfield =

1968 film

- Directed by: Rudolf Zehetgruber
- Written by: Katharina Gajda; Rudolf Zehetgruber
- Produced by: Gerald Martell
- Starring: Götz George; Werner Pochath; Anthony Steel
- Cinematography: Hannes Staudinger
- Edited by: Annemarie Reisetbauer
- Music by: Hans Hammerschmid
- Production companies: Barbara Film; Terra Film
- Distributed by: Constantin Film
- Release date: 16 April 1968
- Running time: 81 minutes
- Country: West Germany
- Language: German

The Long Day of Inspector Blomfield (German: Inspektor Blomfields Fall Nr.1) is a 1968 West German crime thriller film directed by Rudolf Zehetgruber and starring Götz George, Werner Pochath and Anthony Steel. It was one of a number of movies Steel made in Europe while based in Rome.

== Premise ==
A drug addicted man takes over a British police station, holding it hostage with a bottle of nitroglycerine. He demands to see Inspector Blomfeld, but the Inspector is away dealing with another case.

== Cast ==
Actor	Character
Götz George	Eddie Blomfield
Werner Pochath	Johnny Smith
Anthony Steel	Arthur Baker
Walter Barnes	Insp. Fred Lancaster
Ingeborg Schöner	Mrs. Gilespie
Eddi Arent	Sgt. Harry Colman
Gert Günther Hoffmann	Mac O'Hara
Siegfried Wischnewski	Insp. Sterling
Karl Schönböck	Col. Lister
Herbert Fux	Blincky Smith
Leopold Rudolf	Shakespeare
