= Ralf Wolter =

German actor (1926–2022)

- Born: 26 November 1926; Berlin, Brandenburg, Prussia, Germany
- Died: 14 October 2022 (aged 95); Munich, Bavaria, Germany
- Years active: 1948–2012

Ralf Wolter (26 November 1926 – 14 October 2022) was a German stage and screen actor. Wolter appeared in nearly 220 films and television series in his over 60 years as a character actor.

== Life and career ==
Wolter began his long career on the Berlin stage and in cabaret during the late 1940s. He made his first film appearance in Die Frauen des Herrn S. and quickly achieved prominence as an actor for comedic supporting roles. In 1961, he appeared as the baldheaded Soviet agent Borodenko in Billy Wilder's comedy One, Two, Three with James Cagney and Horst Buchholz. Another Hollywood film with Wolter in a supporting role was Cabaret (1972), where he played, alongside Liza Minnelli, the role of the neighbour Herr Ludwig, a publisher of pornographic books who later turns out to be a Nazi.

In Germany, Wolter achieved his greatest fame as the eccentric but friendly trapper Sam Hawkens and as Hadschi Halef Omar in a number of highly successful Karl May film adaptations during the 1960s. He reprised his role as Sam Hawkens in a television series from 1980. He also appeared with Heinz Erhardt in the 1970 comedy What Is the Matter with Willi? and in a few musical films with singing child star Heintje Simons. As his film roles got more obscure during his later years, he turned more and more towards television since the 1970s. He appeared in some of the most successful German television series. As of 2014, Wolter still appeared as a stage and screen actor, one of his final films was Fly Away (2012), co-starring Otto Sander.

In May 2002, he caused a motorway accident on the Bundesautobahn 24 with three deaths. He was sentenced to ten months on conditional discharge.

Wolter was married with his wife Edith from 1959 until his death, they had two children. He died on 14 October 2022, at the age of 95.

== Selected filmography ==
- Die Frauen des Herrn S. (1951) – Pachulles
- The Phantom of the Big Tent (1954) – Motta, Geschäftsführer
- The Captain and His Hero (1955) – Ängstlicher Rekrut
- Sergeant Borck (1955) – Zopfer
- Hotel Adlon (1955) – Mann vom Soldatencorps (uncredited)
- Vor Gott und den Menschen (1955)
- Your Life Guards (1955) – Bursche Jonny
- Urlaub auf Ehrenwort (1955) – Gefreiter Max Schmiedecke
- The Girl from Flanders (1956) – German Soldier
- A Thousand Melodies (1956) – Hugo Pähler
- Der Glockengießer von Tirol (1956) – Aufnahmeleiter Knopf
- My Father, the Actor (1956) – Lokal-Besucher
- The Model Husband (1956) – Trainer
- Like Once Lili Marleen (1956) – Deutscher Soldat
- The Old Forester House (1957) – Max
- Der Adler vom Velsatal (1957)
- Jede Nacht in einem anderen Bett (1957) – Portier
- Victor and Victoria (1957) – Friseur (uncredited)
- Confessions of Felix Krull (1957) – Gestellungspflichtiger
- Tired Theodore (1957) – Gerichtsvollzieher Storch
- Spring in Berlin (1957) – Erklärer im Rundfahrtbus
- The Legs of Dolores (1957) – Mecki Wenzel, ein Alles-Könner
- The Spessart Inn (1958) – Räuber (uncredited)
- A Time to Love and a Time to Die (1958) – Feldmann the Taylor (uncredited)
- Schmutziger Engel (1958) – Turnlehrer
- Grabenplatz 17 (1958) – Ringrichter
- The Muzzle (1958) – Thürnagel
- Wir Wunderkinder (1958) – Bathroom waiter (uncredited)
- Wenn die Conny mit dem Peter (1958) – Pedell Haberstock
- Schlag auf Schlag (1959) – Balduin Balg
- Freddy, the Guitar and the Sea (1959) – Fietje
- Bobby Dodd greift ein (1959)
- Every Day Isn't Sunday (1959) – Dienstmann Huber
- Of Course, the Motorists (1959) – Oberwachtmeister
- Roses for the Prosecutor (1959) – Hessel
- The Beautiful Adventure (1959) – Taschendieb
- Two Times Adam, One Time Eve (1959) – Paavo
- Peter Voss, Hero of the Day (1959) – Charley, der Jockey
- Triplets on Board (1959) – Friseur
- The Goose of Sedan (1959) – Uhlan Lehmann
- The High Life (1960) – Schlotter
- We Cellar Children (1960) – Kameramann Keschke der 'Neuen Deutschen Schau'
- Conny and Peter Make Music (1960) – Lehmann, Sulzbachs Assistant
- Grounds for Divorce (1960) – Dr. Waldgeist
- Mal drunter - mal drüber (1960) – Buschbeck
- Kauf dir einen bunten Luftballon (1961) – Luggi
- One Prettier Than the Other (1961) – Straßenkehrer
- Always Trouble with the Bed (1961) – Meister
- Adieu, Lebewohl, Goodbye (1961) – Pietro
- Robert and Bertram (1961) – Toni Knauer
- Blind Justice (1961) – Fotograf
- One, Two, Three (1961) – Borodenko
- The Liar (1961) – (uncredited)
- Ramona (1961) – Delon
- Freddy und das Lied der Südsee (1962) – Hannes
- The Post Has Gone (1962) – Herr Ratsam
- Treasure of Silver Lake (1962) – Sam Hawkens
- Love Has to Be Learned (1963) – Müller
- A Holiday Like Never Before (1963)
- 12 Angry Men (1963, TV Movie) – Juror 6
- Apache Gold (1963) – Sam Hawkens
- The Inn on Dartmoor (1964) – O'Hara
- Old Shatterhand (1964) – Sam Hawkens
- The Shoot (1964) – Hadschi Halef Omar
- Coffin from Hong Kong (1964) – Bob Tooly
- Massacre at Marble City (1964) – Tim Fletcher
- The Treasure of the Aztecs (1965) – Andreas Hasenpfeffer
- The Pyramid of the Sun God (1965) – Andreas Hasenpfeffer
- Wild Kurdistan (1965) – Hadschi Halef Omar
- The Desperado Trail (1965) – Sam Hawkens
- Kingdom of the Silver Lion (1965) – Hadschi Halef Omar
- Who Killed Johnny R.? (1966) – Billy Monroe
- Winnetou and the Crossbreed (1966) – Sam Hawkens
- Treasure of San Gennaro (1966) – Frank
- Ein Fall für Titus Bunge (1967, TV Series) – Titus Bunge
- Murderers Club of Brooklyn (1967) – Photographer (voice, uncredited)
- Spy Today, Die Tomorrow (1967) – Spiegel
- Midsummer Night (1967) – Iskey
- The Heathens of Kummerow (1967) – Krischan
- Heubodengeflüster (1967) – Dr. Leo Dorn
- Paradies der flotten Sünder (1968) – Butler Percy
- Otto ist auf Frauen scharf (1968) – Dr. Kobalt
- Sexy Susan Sins Again (1968) – Bookdealer
- The Valley of Death (1968) – Sam Hawkens
- Einer fehlt beim Kurkonzert (1968, TV Movie) – Dr. Knopf
- Hannibal Brooks (1969) – Dr. Mendel
- House of Pleasure (1969) – Watchmaker Bobinet
- The Brazen Women of Balzac (1969) – Toni
- Charley's Uncle (1969) – Polizist
- The Young Tigers of Hong Kong (1969) – Bob
- Heintje: A Heart Goes on a Journey (1969) – Harry
- Helgalein (1969)
- The Sweet Pussycats (1969) – Philippe
- Naughty Roommates (1969) – Cajetan Fingerlos
- Heintje - Einmal wird die Sonne wieder scheinen (1970) – Jahrmarktsbude
- Hilfe, mich liebt eine Jungfrau (1970)
- What Is the Matter with Willi? (1970) – Felix Klein
- Heintje - Mein bester Freund (1970) – Max
- Love, Vampire Style (1970) – Christian Wagner
- Das Glöcklein unterm Himmelbett (1970) – Emil Giesecke
- Zwanzig Mädchen und die Pauker – Heute steht die Penne kopf (1971)
- Das haut den stärksten Zwilling um (1971) – Richard Strauss
- Aunt Trude from Buxtehude (1971) – Der Hausverwalter
- Wir hau'n den Hauswirt in die Pfanne (1971) – Amadeus Kleinschmidt
- Morgen fällt die Schule aus (1971) – Dr. Geis
- Einer spinnt immer (1971) – Notar
- Holiday Report (1971) – Horst-Dieter Mitterer
- Außer Rand und Band am Wolfgangsee (1972) – Notar
- Cabaret (1972) – Herr Ludwig
- Kinderarzt Dr. Fröhlich (1972) – Notar Fritz Pfeiffer
- My Daughter, Your Daughter (1972) – Bibo
- Lilli - die Braut der Kompanie (1972) – Stabsarzt
- The Heath Is Green (1972) – Herr Hoegen
- The 500 Pound Jerk (1973, TV Movie) – Glabov
- Old Barge, Young Love (1973) – Erwin
- Unsere Tante ist das Letzte (1973) – Luigi
- Schwarzwaldfahrt aus Liebeskummer (1974) – Evas Vater
- Waldrausch (1977) – Rixner
- The Serpent's Egg (1977) – Partner of the Master of Ceremonies
- Dracula Blows His Cool (1979) – Boris
- Mein Freund Winnetou (1980, TV Series) – Sam Hawkens
- Piratensender Powerplay (1982) – Rundfunkintendant
- A Love in Germany (1983) – Schulze
- Lass das - ich hass das (1983) – Richter
- Drei gegen Drei (1985) – Kaminski
- Der Schatz im Niemandsland (1987, TV Series) – Kriminalbeamter
- High Score (1990)
- Ein Schloß am Wörthersee (1990, TV Series) – Schultz
- Otto - Der Liebesfilm (1992) – Intendant Gotthilf Gutmann
- Mit Leib und Seele (1990–1993, TV Series) – Horst Metzger
- Asterix Conquers America (1994) – Getafix (German Dub)
- Vendetta (1995) – Don Giovanni
- Killer Condom (1996) – Prof. Smirnoff
- The Children of Captain Grant (1996) – Monk
- Dinosaurier – Gegen uns seht ihr alt aus! (2009) – Peter
- Fly Away (2012) – Willy Stronz
