= Ernst W. Kalinke =

German cinematographer

- Born: 23 September 1918; Berlin, German Empire
- Died: 14 January 1992 (aged 73); Munich, Bavaria, Germany
- Occupation: Cinematographer
- Years active: 1948–1985 (film)

Ernst W. Kalinke (1918–1992) was a German cinematographer. He shot over a hundred films during his career and also directed one, the 1982 comedy Die liebestollen Lederhosen

== Selected filmography ==
- Encounter with Werther (1949)
- Czardas of Hearts (1951)
- The Lady in Black (1951)
- The Last Shot (1951)
- The Postponed Wedding Night (1953)
- Aunt Jutta from Calcutta (1953)
- The Immortal Vagabond (1953)
- The Village Under the Sky (1953)
- Victoria and Her Hussar (1954)
- The Sun of St. Moritz (1954)
- Hello, My Name Is Cox (1955)
- As Long as There Are Pretty Girls (1955)
- The Mistress of Solderhof (1955)
- The Beggar Student (1956)
- Aunt Wanda from Uganda (1957)
- The Green Devils of Monte Cassino (1958)
- U 47 – Kapitänleutnant Prien (1958)
- A Song Goes Round the World (1958)
- Der Frosch mit der Maske (1959)
- Bombs on Monte Carlo (1960)
- We Will Never Part (1960)
- Adieu, Lebewohl, Goodbye (1961)
- Treasure of Silver Lake (1962)
- The Invisible Dr. Mabuse (1962)
- The Strangler of Blackmoor Castle (1963)
- Apache Gold (1963)
- Room 13 (1964)
- Last of the Renegades (1964)
- The Sinister Monk (1965)
- The Desperado Trail (1965)
- The Last Tomahawk (1965)
- Die Nibelungen (1966)
- Creature with the Blue Hand (1967)
- Seven Days Grace (1969)
- Mark of the Devil (1970)
- Perrak (1970)
- The Sex Nest (1970)
- The Bordello (1971)
- Hubertus Castle (1973)
- Mark of the Devil Part II (1973)
- The Hunter of Fall (1974)
- Silence in the Forest (1976)
- Waldrausch (1977)
- Lady Dracula (1977)
- Inn of the Sinful Daughters (1978)
- Goetz von Berlichingen of the Iron Hand (1979)
- Three Lederhosen in St. Tropez (1980)
- Der Bockerer (1981)

== Bibliography ==
- Bergfelder, Tim. International Adventures: German Popular Cinema and European Co-Productions in the 1960s. Berghahn Books, 2005.
