= Winnetou and the Crossbreed =

1966 film

- Directed by: Harald Philipp
- Written by: Fred Denger
- Based on: Themes from novels by Karl May
- Produced by: Erwin Gitt; Stipe Gurdulic; Charles Wakefield; Horst Wendlandt
- Starring: Lex Barker; Pierre Brice; Götz George; Uschi Glas
- Cinematography: Heinz Hölscher
- Edited by: Jutta Hering
- Music by: Martin Böttcher
- Production companies: Jadran Film; Rialto Film
- Distributed by: Constantin Film
- Release date: 19 August 1966
- Running time: 90 minutes
- Countries: West Germany; Italy; Yugoslavia
- Language: German

Winnetou and the Crossbreed (German: Winnetou und das Halbblut Apanatschi) is a 1966 West German Western film directed by Harald Philipp and starring Lex Barker, Pierre Brice, Götz George and Uschi Glas. It is part of the series of Karl May adaptations produced by Rialto Film during the decade. It was co-produced with Italy and Yugoslavia. The budget was an estimated three and a half million Deutschmarks.

This was the first in the series to not be based on a May novel, only on his characters. It was not a box office success, unlike previous releases which had been major hits. However, it did launch the career of Uschi Glas as an important actress.

It was shot at the Spandau Studios in Berlin and on location in Yugoslavia. The film's sets were designed by Vladimir Tadej.

In contrast to most other Karl May film adaptations, the United States Army makes no appearance and none of the Kiowas have any speaking roles.

== Plot ==
Curly Bill and his gang have taken over a local town. The good citizens have fled to a nearby camp of railroad workers. Meanwhile Apanatschi's father Mac shows his 21-year old daughter the location of a gold mine, which only he and Winnetou know about. Pincky and Sloan, two of Mac's friends, learn of its existence and in their greed force Mac to lead them to it, but Mac is killed on the way. Pinky and Sloan thus try to capture Apanatschi, who also knows about the mine's location, but she flees to the railroad camp. Curly Bill gets wind of the gold when Pinky and Sloan visit the town and the gang raids the railroad camp to abduct Apanatschi, during which Pinky and Sloan are killed and Mac's murder thus avenged. In retaliation the railroad workers assault and retake the town and free Apanatschi, who is sent to live with a Kiowa tribe. Curly Bill abducts Apanatschi's little brother Happy from the tribe and Winnetou in exchange for the boy's freedom shows the bandits the location of the gold mine. Curly Bill and his gang exploit the mine and return to the town with sacks full of gold, now led by Bill's right hand man Judge who has disposed of his boss in a coup d'etat. The railroad workers however have mined the town with dynamite and are lying in wait. In the final battle with help from the Kiowas they defeat the bandits and plan to rebuild the town with the gold gifted to them by Apanatschi, who goes on to marry Jeff.

== Cast ==
- Lex Barker as Old Shatterhand - man of the law affiliated with the railroad workers
- Pierre Brice as Winnetou - chieftain, man of the law and friend of Apanatschi's family
- Götz George as Jeff Brown - Apanatschi's fiance and undercover with the bandits
- Uschi Glas as Apanatschi - owner of a secret gold mine
- Walter Barnes as Mac Haller - Apanatschi's father
- Ralf Wolter as Sam Hawkens - Old Shatterhand's sidekick
- Miha Baloh as Judge - Curly Bill's lieutenant
- Marija Crnobori as Mine-Yota - Apanatschi's mother
- Ilija Džuvalekovski as Curly-Bill - leader of the bandits
- Marinko Cosic as Happy - Apanatschi's little brother
- Petar Dobric as Sloan
- Vladimir Leib as Pincky - former friends of Mac and the first to try and steal the gold
- Abdurrahman Shala as Hank - middle management in Curly Bill's gang
- Nada Kasapic as Miss Bessie - runs the town's red light district

== Quotes ==
"Nicht doch mein Junge! Das ist ein Schreck in der Morgenstunde, was. Komm mein Junge, komm. Ins Knusperhäuschen." - Sam Hawkens.

== Bibliography ==
- Bergfelder, Tim. International Adventures: German Popular Cinema and European Co-Productions in the 1960s. Berghahn Books, 2005.
