= Apache Gold =

1963 film

- Directed by: Harald Reinl
- Written by: Harald G. Petersson
- Based on: Winnetou novels by Karl May
- Produced by: Horst Wendlandt
- Starring: Lex Barker; Pierre Brice; Mario Adorf; Marie Versini
- Cinematography: Ernst W. Kalinke
- Edited by: Hermann Haller
- Music by: Martin Böttcher; Marie Versini
- Production companies: Jadran Film; Rialto Film
- Distributed by: Constantin Film (West Germany)
- Release date: 11 December 1963
- Running time: 101 minutes
- Countries: West Germany; Italy; Yugoslavia
- Language: German
- Budget: 4 million DM
- Box office: $36.7 million (est.)

Apache Gold (German: Winnetou, later retitled to Winnetou – 1. Teil), also known as Winnetou the Warrior, is a 1963 Western film directed by Harald Reinl. It is based on the story of Winnetou, a fictional Native-American Apache hero from the Winnetou series of German novels. It was a major commercial success, selling about 77 million tickets at the worldwide box office.

It was shot at the Spandau Studios in Berlin and on location in Croatia, then part of Yugoslavia, near the city of Zadar. The film's sets were designed by art director Vladimir Tadej.

== Plot ==
Santer and his gang are after the Apache Gold. They intrude Apache land and intercept a courier named Black Eagle. The young warrior is killed as the outlaws attempt to extract information from him.

Meanwhile, the young chartered surveyor Charlie aka "Old Shatterhand" discovers that the Great Western Railway commits a breach of valid contracts by taking a shortcut through Apache land. He is told that certain geological complications would leave the company no other choice, but he finds these allegations to be a pretext to save money even at the costs of lives.

Winnetou observes how the railway is built right into the land of his tribe. On his way back to his village he comes across the corpse of Black Eagle. He brings Black Eagle to his family and reports to his father Intschu-tschuna.

Chief Intshu-tshuna is deeply worried that even more villains like Santer will get to the Apache land and consequently kill his people if the Great Western Railway can carry on.

A missionary called Klekih-petra urges him not to start a war. He talks the aristocratic chief and his son Winnetou into setting up a meeting with a deputation of the Great Western Railway. Proceedings are prepared and Old Shatterhand is chosen to convince the Indians that the company will respect the contracts after all.

But Santer does not let go of his ambitions. He strives to give Winnetou's people a bad name, so that the U.S.Army will come and drive the people off their land, hereby making way for his personal ambitions.

Santer persuades the chief of a Kiowa tribe to attack the meeting. Klekih-petra is hereby killed and Winnetou is captured by his arch enemies who plan to torture him.

Old Shatterhand risks his life in order to save Winnetou. At night he sneaks into the Kiowa's camp and cuts the chief's son's fetters. Winnetou escapes but doesn't see his savior.

Now Old Shatterhand and his supporters commence a crusade against Santer and his henchmen. They go to Santer's strongpoint, a town called Roswell. There a tremendous fight takes place. But Winnetou also has unfinished business with Santer and goes there too. As an outsider he cannot tell the good men from the bad ones. He and his warriors attack the whole town.

Old Shatterhand is wounded and captured. Winnetou has him brought to the Apache village. Upon his reawakening, Intschu-tschuna's daughter Nsho-tshi does not believe his story. It is decided that once he has recovered he must stand trial. He claims an ordeal by battle. Chief Intshu-tshuna himself takes him on a canoe race and Old Shatterhand narrowly wins.

After Old Shatterhand has spared the chief and Nsho-tshi has discovered proof that Shatterhand did free her brother, Shatterhand and Winnetou become Blood brothers.

Although this tribe is at the brink of civilization and the leading family does already build houses, Nsho-tshi wants to attend a school in St. Louis before she marries Old Shatterhand. In order to cover the looming expenses her family goes to their source of gold. But Santer is still alive and hasn't ceased to pursue his evil plans. He follows and ambushes them. Winnetou's father dies during the fight and Nsho-tshi dies only little later in the arms of Old Shatterhand.

== Cast ==
- Pierre Brice as Winnetou
- Lex Barker as Old Shatterhand
- Mario Adorf as Frederick Santer
- Walt Barnes as Bill Jones
- Marie Versini as Nsho-tshi, Winnetou's sister
- Ralf Wolter as Sam Hawkens
- Milivoj Popović as Mavid as Intshu-tshuna, Winnetou's father
- Antun Nalis as barkeeper Hicks
- Dunja Rajter as Belle
- Niksa Stefanini as Bullock
- Branko Špoljar as Bancroft
- Chris Howland as Jefferson Tuff-Tuff
- Husein Čokic as Will Parker
- Demeter Bitenc as Dick Stone
- Niksa Stefanini as Bullock
- Karl Dall as saloon guest
- Hrvoje Svob as Klekih-petra

== Awards ==
- Goldene Leinwand ("Golden Screen")
- Bambi

== Background ==
The English version is shorter than the original German one. Many of Ralf Wolter's scenes are shorter. Moreover, Chris Howland's appearances as a preposterous and naive English photojournalist have been dropped completely.

== Box office ==
It was the highest-grossing film of 1963 in West Germany, selling 10 million tickets and grossing €10 million ($10 million).

In France, it sold 1,126,887 tickets in 1964, equivalent to an estimated $700,000 in gross revenue. (Note: See Average ticket price § List.) In Poland, it sold about 11 million tickets in 1968, breaking the all-time record for the highest-grossing foreign film in Poland.

It was later released in the Soviet Union, where it sold 56 million tickets in 1975, becoming the third highest-grossing foreign film of the year and the 12th highest-grossing foreign film ever in the Soviet Union. This was equivalent to an estimated $26 million in gross revenue.

In total, the film sold 78,126,887 tickets at the worldwide box office, including an estimated gross revenue of $36.7 million in Germany, France and the Soviet Union.

== United States ==
Released on a limited basis in the United States by Columbia Pictures, the film was aired on television in several cities.

== See also ==
- Broken Arrow (1950 film)
- White Feather (1955 film)
- Last of the Renegades
- List of highest-grossing non-English films
