= Harald G. Petersson =

German screenwriter

- Born: 16 October 1904; Weimar, German Empire
- Died: 8 July 1977 (aged 72); West Berlin, West Germany
- Occupation: Screenwriter
- Years active: 1934-1967
- Spouse: Sybille Schmitz

Harald G. Petersson (16 October 1904 – 8 July 1977) was a German screenwriter. He wrote for 36 films between 1934 and 1967. He was born in Weimar, Germany and died in West Berlin, West Germany.

== Selected filmography ==
- The Coral Princess (1937)
- The Secret Lie (1938)
- The Night of Decision (1938)
- Red Orchids (1938)
- Woman Without a Past (1939)
- A Man Astray (1940)
- Lightning Around Barbara (1941)
- The Impostor (1944)
- Anna Alt (1945)
- Raid (1947)
- An Everyday Story (1948)
- Nora's Ark (1948)
- The Last Night (1949)
- Crime After School (1959)
- The Door with Seven Locks (1962)
- The Inn on the River (1962)
- Axel Munthe, The Doctor of San Michele (1962)
- The Squeaker (1963)
- The Indian Scarf (1963)
- Apache Gold (1963)
- Der Hexer (1964)
- Last of the Renegades (1964)
- Winnetou and Old Firehand (1966)
- Creature with the Blue Hand (1967)
