= Mein Freund Winnetou =

- Directed by: Marcel Camus
- Starring: Pierre Brice
- Country of origin: Germany

Mein Freund Winnetou is a 1980 German television miniseries, starring Pierre Brice in the title role and directed by Marcel Camus. A Western, it is part of an extended series of films and television series in which Brice played the fictional Apache chief Winnetou, first introduced in novels by Karl May. It also featured performances from actors such as Ralf Wolter and Siegfried Rauch. In some countries it was released in fourteen episodes, while in others it was released in seven longer episodes.

== Cast ==
- Pierre Brice as Winnetou
- Siegfried Rauch as Old Shatterhand
- Ralf Wolter as Sam Hawkens
- Arthur Brauss as Lt. Robert Merril
- Elpidia Carrillo as Wetatoni
- Rosenda Monteros as Hehaka Win
- Jacques François as Stevens
- Jean-Claude Deret as Charbonneau
- Eric Do as Tashunko
- Miguel Ángel Fuentes as Yaqui

== See also ==
- List of German television series
