= Martin Böttcher =

German composer, arranger, and conductor (1927–2019)

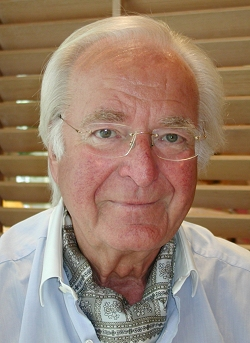
Martin Böttcher, 2002

Martin Böttcher (17 June 1927 – 20 April 2019) was a German composer, arranger and conductor.

== Early life ==
Böttcher (on foreign records and articles often written "Bottcher" or "Boettcher", the latter being the correct transliteration of the German umlaut "ö") began taking piano lessons at an early age. But his first passion was flying, and he wanted to become a test pilot. Not yet seventeen years old, he got his military training in the German Luftwaffe. However, due to lack of fuel, he never went into action.

As a prisoner of war, Böttcher managed to get hold of a guitar and taught himself to play it. Following his release from captivity, he went to Hamburg. There, he started his musical career with the then Nordwestdeutscher Rundfunk, in the dance and entertainment orchestra which had been newly founded by Willi Steiner, and which was held in high esteem in England.

He also gained important experience as an arranger for film composers, among them Michael Jary and Hans-Martin Majewski, for whom he arranged part of the music for Love '47.

== Career ==
In 1950, Böttcher recorded the first trick guitar pieces in Germany in the style of Les Paul. He left the music stand in 1954 and turned to manuscript paper. His talent did not escape the attention of the German film industry, which was just gaining new momentum at that time.

Thanks to film producer Artur Brauner, Böttcher made his cinematic debut in 1955, composing the music for the military satire The Captain and His Hero. His second film score turned out to be a milestone in German film history. Teenage Wolfpack directed by Georg Tressler and starring Horst Buchholz, met with tremendous success. Mr. Martin's Band comprised the top German jazz musicians, among them Horst Fischer, Fatty George, Bill Grah, Ernst Mosch and Hans 'James' Last.

Böttcher also composed for Hans Albers and for Heinz Rühmann's 'Father Brown' movies. Max the Pickpocket (1962) contained the track "Hawaii Tattoo" (recorded by "The Waikikis"), which Böttcher had written under the pseudonym of Michael Thomas. Within a short time, this theme became famous worldwide, and achieved recognition in the American Billboard charts.

Martin Böttcher found his greatest success in the 1960s composing the score for ten of the Karl May films, the first being Treasure of Silver Lake with the famous "Old-Shatterhand-Melodie". The films starred, among many others, American actor Lex Barker and British actor Stewart Granger. The audience enjoyed the wistful melodies, the fanfare-like music accompanying attacks, and the cheerful hillbilly tunes. Martin Böttcher's main themes from these films reached top positions in the German charts and sold thousands of records. The music for the Winnetou films is a landmark in German film music history. The success of these films, accompanied by Böttcher's music, made possible the "Spaghetti Westerns" with the music of Ennio Morricone.

With the German film industry declining at the end of the 1960s, Martin Böttcher increasingly focused on working for German TV. In the 1970s he wrote a number of successful scores, among them music for the TV series Sonderdezernat K1 and numerous episodes of Der Alte and Derrick, which are also known outside Germany. He again came in contact with the works of Karl May when he wrote the score for the 26-episode series Kara Ben Nemsi Effendi. The writer of Der Illegale (a TV mini-series), Henry Kolarz, said, "Even if I spoilt it, Böttcher's music is much too good for everything to go wrong."

Throughout the following years Martin Böttcher continued to compose more evergreen themes for TV-series, such as It Can't Always Be Caviar (1977), Schöne Ferien (Beautiful holidays) or Forsthaus Falkenau. In the 1990s, among others, Air Albatros took off - a project he used to pay tribute to his passion of flying.

Americans became aware of him as an arranger and orchestra director. When they heard his renditions of the world-famous themes "Tara's Theme" and "Theme from 'A Summerplace'", Martin Böttcher was made an honorary member of the Max Steiner Society.

In 1998, the composer once more got on the German charts. A band from Cologne, the "Superboys", achieved a hit with a vocal version of the "Winnetou-Melodie" from the second Winnetou film. Their song "Ich wünscht' du wärst bei mir" ("Wish U Were Here") reached the top of the ZDF television charts. Another cover version by the Czech group Těžkej Pokondr called "Vinetu" received double-platinum in their country in March 2000.

The "master of tunes" was honoured in 2002: as a jury member (Europäischer Förderpreis - a European talent award) Martin Böttcher represented Germany at that year's European Biennale for Film Music in Bonn.

== Selected filmography ==
- The Captain and His Hero (1955)
- Teenage Wolfpack (1956)
- Lemke's Widow (1957)
- Thirteen Old Donkeys (1958)
- My Ninety Nine Brides (1958)
- The Woman by the Dark Window (1960)
- Pension Schöller (1960)
- The Black Sheep (1960)
- You Don't Shoot at Angels (1960)
- The Forger of London (1961)
- Our House in Cameroon (1961)
- Max the Pickpocket (1962)
- Murder Party (1961)
- The Inn on the River (1962)
- He Can't Stop Doing It (1962)
- Street of Temptation (1962)
- Treasure of Silver Lake (1962)
- The Black Abbot (1963)
- Apache Gold (1963)
- Mission to Hell (1964)
- The Phantom of Soho (1964)
- Last of the Renegades (1964)
- The Shoot (1964)
- Among Vultures (1964)
- The Oil Prince (1965)
- The Desperado Trail (1965)
- Old Surehand (1965)
- Winnetou and the Crossbreed (1966)
- Long Legs, Long Fingers (1966)
- Zärtliche Haie (1967)
- Creature with the Blue Hand (1967)
- The College Girl Murders (1967)
- The Valley of Death (1968)
- The Duck Rings at Half Past Seven (1968)
- Dr. Fabian: Laughing Is the Best Medicine (1969)
- Moonlighting Mistress (1970)
- Holidays in Tyrol (1971)
- Willi Manages The Whole Thing (1972)
- Bread and Stones (1979)

== Awards ==
- On 9 October 1995 the Deutsche Filmmusikpreise (German film music awards) were awarded at the Bonner Bundeskunsthalle. Martin Böttcher was honoured with the prize for his "outstanding contribution to German film history, which shows in an abundant musical oeuvre"; he was the first person to receive this prize.
- In 1997, he was given a "special award" for his successful Karl May melodies by Schacht Music Publishers at the Karl May Festival in Bad Segeberg.
- On 15 April 2000 Martin Böttcher received the "Edgar Wallace Award in Gold" for his merits in German crime movies.
- On 25 January 2004 Martin Böttcher was awarded the German Bundesverdienstkreuz (Federal Cross of Merit) in St. Moritz for his lifetime achievement.
- On 28 May 2009 Martin Böttcher got the Deutscher Musikautorenpreis (German music authors’ award), category "composition for films".
- On 27 June 2013 Martin Böttcher was honoured in Munich with the Look & Listen – Telepool-BR-Music-Award.

== Literature ==
- Reiner Boller: Winnetou-Melodie - Martin Böttcher - Die Biographie. Gryphon Verlag, 2003, 200 Seiten, mit einem Vorwort von Pierre Brice. ISBN 3-89602-444-2
