= The Valley of Death (film) =

1968 film

- German film poster
- German: Winnetou und Shatterhand im Tal der Toten
- Directed by: Harald Reinl
- Written by: Herbert Reinecker; Harald Reinl
- Based on: Winnetou novels by Karl May
- Produced by: Artur Brauner; Sulejman Kapic; Zvonko Kovacic; Rolf Meier; Götz Dieter Wulf
- Starring: Lex Barker; Pierre Brice; Rik Battaglia
- Cinematography: Ernst W. Kalinke
- Edited by: Hermann Haller
- Music by: Martin Böttcher
- Production companies: Jadran Film; CCC Film
- Distributed by: Constantin Film
- Release date: 12 December 1968
- Running time: 89 minutes
- Countries: West Germany; Italy; Yugoslavia
- Language: German

The Valley of Death or Winnetou and Shatterhand in the Valley of Death (German: Winnetou und Shatterhand im Tal der Toten) is a 1968 western film directed by Harald Reinl and starring Lex Barker, Pierre Brice and Rik Battaglia. It was the last in a series of films based on Karl May novels. These had previously enjoyed major commercial success, although this film's box office returns were disappointing. It was effectively a remake of an earlier film in the series Treasure of Silver Lake.

It was shot at the Spandau Studios in West Berlin and on location in Yugoslavia. The film's sets were designed by the art director Vladimir Tadej.

== Cast ==
- Lex Barker as Old Shatterhand
- Pierre Brice as Winnetou
- Rik Battaglia as Murdock
- Karin Dor as Mabel Kingsley
- Ralf Wolter as Sam Hawkens
- Clarke Reynolds as Capt. Cummings
- Kurt Waitzmann as Col. Bergson
- Heinz Welzel as Richter
- Branko Špoljar as Cranfield
- Vladimir Medar as Sheriff
- Voyo Goric as Red Buffalo
- Eddi Arent as Lord Castlepool
