= Karl Löb =

- Occupation: Cinematographer

Karl Löb was a cinematographer. He worked on the 1953 comedy Miss Casanova.

== Selected filmography ==
- The Spanish Fly (1931)
- Signal in the Night (1937)
- After Midnight (1938)
- The Leghorn Hat (1939)
- Torreani (1951)
- The Prince of Pappenheim (1952)
- The Rose of Stamboul (1953)
- The Cousin from Nowhere (1953)
- Clivia (1954)
- The Great Lola (1954)
- The Faithful Hussar (1954)
- Consul Strotthoff (1954)
- The Country Schoolmaster (1954)
- Ball at the Savoy (1955)
- Love, Dance and a Thousand Songs (1955)
- Music in the Blood (1955)
- Before God and Man (1955)
- The First Day of Spring (1956)
- The Beautiful Master (1956)
- Just Once a Great Lady (1957)
- Precocious Youth (1957)
- Munchhausen in Africa (1958)
- The Star of Santa Clara (1958)
- And That on Monday Morning (1959)
- What a Woman Dreams of in Springtime (1959)
- The Thousand Eyes of Dr. Mabuse (1960)
- Yes, Women are Dangerous (1960)
- The Dead Eyes of London (1961)
- The Return of Doctor Mabuse (1961)
- Our House in Cameroon (1961)
- The Inn on the River (1962)
- The Door with Seven Locks (1962)
- The Thousand Eyes of Dr. Mabuse (1962)
- The Indian Scarf (1963)
- Our Crazy Nieces (1963)
- The Last Ride to Santa Cruz (1964)
- Our Crazy Aunts in the South Seas (1964)
- Der Hexer (1964)
- Long Legs, Long Fingers (1966)
- Winnetou and Old Firehand (1966)
- The Hunchback of Soho (1966)
- The College Girl Murders (1967)
- The Gorilla of Soho (1968)
- The Hound of Blackwood Castle (1968)
- The Man with the Glass Eye (1969)
- How Did a Nice Girl Like You Get Into This Business? (1970)
- What Is the Matter with Willi? (1970)
- Under the Roofs of St. Pauli (1970)
- Our Willi Is the Best (1971)
- The Body in the Thames (1971)
- Willi Manages The Whole Thing (1972)
- The Heath Is Green (1972)

== Bibliography ==
- Fritsche, Maria. Homemade Men In Postwar Austrian Cinema: Nationhood, Genre and Masculinity . Berghahn Books, 2013.
