= Horst Wendlandt =

German film producer

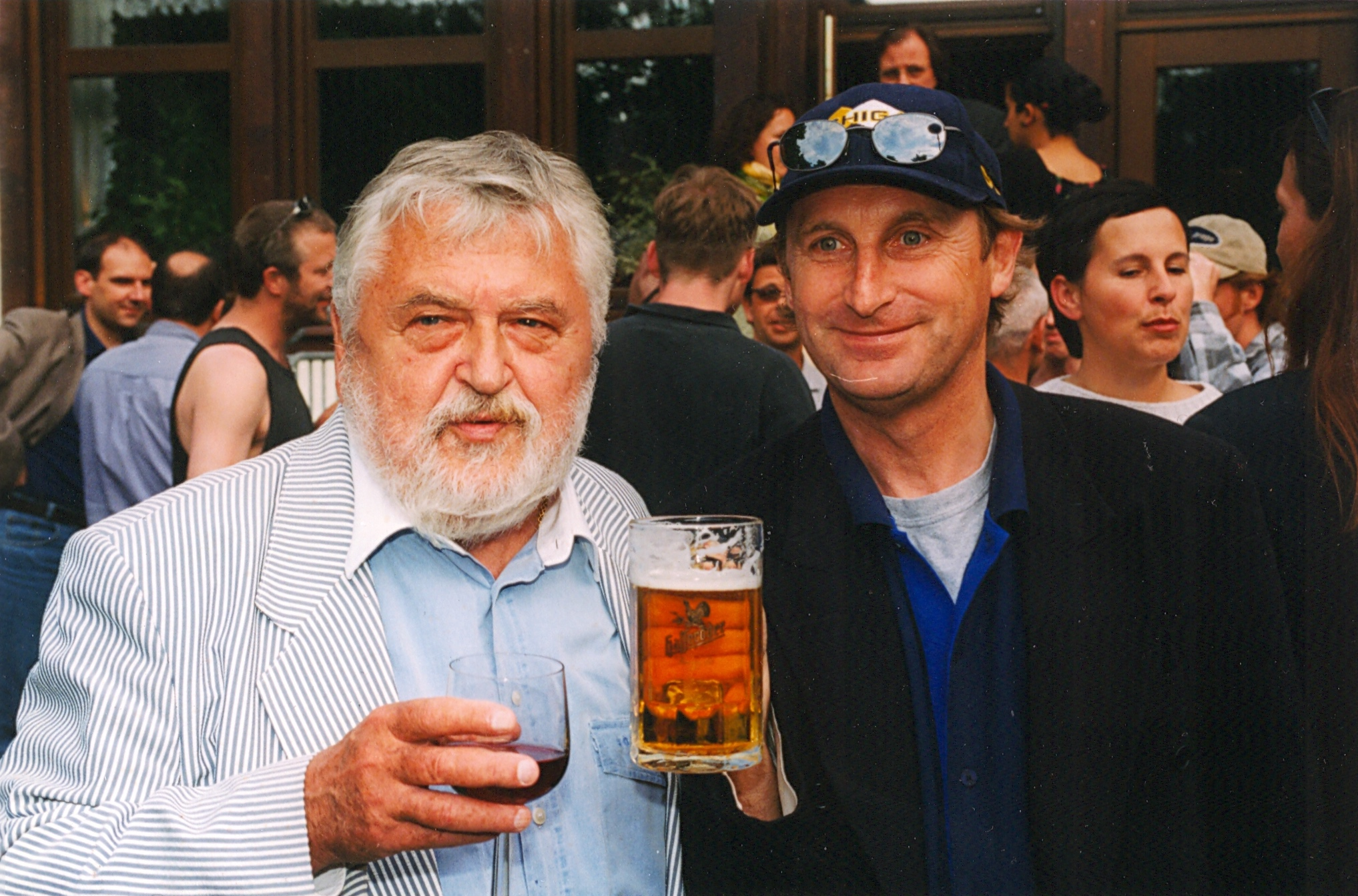
- Born: 15 March 1922; Criewen, Brandenburg, Germany
- Died: 30 August 2002 (aged 80); Berlin, Germany
- Occupation: Film producer
- Years active: 1956-2002

Horst Otto Gregor Wendlandt (15 March 1922 – 30 August 2002) was a German film producer. He produced more than 100 films between 1956 and 2002.

In the 1960s Horst Wendlandt's production company Rialto Film produced films based on Edgar Wallace and Karl May, mostly directed by Alfred Vohrer or Harald Reinl. In 1971 Horst Wendlandt founded the film distribution company Tobis Film (named after the old Tobis Film). Tobis was very successful in the 1970s with European films with Jean-Paul Belmondo, Louis de Funès, Terence Hill and Bud Spencer, also with Dino De Laurentiis-productions like Death Wish, Mandingo and King Kong.

== Selected filmography ==
- The First Day of Spring (1956)
- Love (1956)
- Kindermädchen für Papa gesucht (1957)
- The Night of the Storm (1957)
- Precocious Youth (1957)
- Confess, Doctor Corda (1958)
- La Paloma (1959)
- Peter Shoots Down the Bird (1959)
- What a Woman Dreams of in Springtime (1959)
- Grounds for Divorce (1960)
- The Strange Countess (1961)
- Our House in Cameroon (1961)
- The Green Archer (1961)
- The Devil's Daffodil (1961)
- The Dead Eyes of London (1961)
- The Inn on the River (1962)
- The Door with Seven Locks (1962)
- The Puzzle of the Red Orchid (1962)
- Apache Gold (1963)
- The Indian Scarf (1963)
- The Black Abbot (1963)
- The Squeaker (1963)
- Traitor's Gate (1964)
- Room 13 (1964)
- Last of the Renegades (1964)
- Mark of the Tortoise (1964)
- Neues vom Hexer (1965)
- Winnetou and Old Firehand (1966)
- The Hunchback of Soho (1966)
- Winnetou and the Crossbreed (1966)
- Creature with the Blue Hand (1967)
- The Monk with the Whip (1967)
- The Oldest Profession (1967)
- The Hound of Blackwood Castle (1968)
- The Gorilla of Soho (1968)
- Double Face (1969)
- That Guy Loves Me, Am I Supposed to Believe That? (1969)
- The Man with the Glass Eye (1969)
- How Did a Nice Girl Like You Get Into This Business? (1970)
- What Is the Matter with Willi? (1970)
- Our Willi Is the Best (1971)
- The Body in the Thames (1971)
- Willi Manages The Whole Thing (1972)
- Lola (1981)
- Lili Marleen (1981)
- The Man in Pyjamas (1981)
- Buddy Goes West (1981)
- L'as des as (1982)
- Otto – Der Film (1985)
- Momo (1986)
- Ödipussi (1988)
- Pappa ante Portas (1991)
