= Rialto Film =

German film company

- Type: Subsidiary
- Industry: Films
- Founded: 1897 in Copenhagen, Denmark
- Founder: Constantin Philipsen
- Headquarters: Berlin, Germany
- Key people: Felix Wendlandt (CEO)
- Parent: Rialto Bridge AG
- Divisions: Rialto Film Distribution

Rialto Film is a German motion-picture production company headquartered in Berlin. It is named after the Rialto in Venice, and used as its production logo an image of a gondola in front of the Rialto Bridge.

== History ==
The original Danish Rialto Film company was founded in 1897 by Constantin Philipsen (1859–1925) in Copenhagen. In 1950 his son Preben Philipsen (1910–2005) established the Constantin Film distribution at Frankfurt, named after his father, together with his associate Waldfried Barthel (1913–1979). After Philipsen exited Constantin Film in 1955, he again turned to his father's film business in both Scandinavia and Germany. On 18 August 1960, he established Rialto Film GmbH at Frankfurt as a German subsidiary.

Little is known about Rialto's productions prior to 1950. The company became internationally famous after the production of the 1959 film Der Frosch mit der Maske, followed by the release of further 32 films based on the works of Edgar Wallace, as well as 9 films based on the works of Karl May under director Harald Reinl and, from 1960, co-owner Horst Wendlandt. As was the practice of mainstream and successful European cinema, most of the films were international co-productions. Wendlandt's son Matthias joined the company in 1992 as co-managing director, and continued in this role following his father's death in 2002. His own son Felix was made a managing director in 2010.
