= The Squeaker =

The Squeaker may refer to:

- The Squeaker (novel), a novel by Edgar Wallace
- The Squeaker (1930 film), a British film directed by Edgar Wallace
- The Squeaker (1931 film), a German film directed by Martin Frič and Karel Lamač
- The Squeaker (1937 film), a British film directed by William K. Howard
- The Squeaker (1963 film), a West German/French film directed by Alfred Vohrer

== See also ==
- Squeaker (disambiguation)
