= The Crimson Circle =

Crimson Circle may refer to:

- The Crimson Circle (novel), a 1922 crime novel by Edgar Wallace
- The Crimson Circle (1922 film), a British silent film adaptation
- The Crimson Circle (1929 film), a German silent film adaptation
- The Crimson Circle (1936 film), a British film adaptation
- The Crimson Circle (1960 film) a West German film adaptation
- Crimson Circle (Loyola Marymount University), a service organization in Los Angeles whose members come from the Loyola Marymount University
