= Egon Eis =

Austrian screenwriter

- Born: 6 October 1910; Vienna, Austro-Hungarian Empire
- Died: 6 September 1994 (aged 83); Munich, Germany
- Occupation: Screenwriter
- Years active: 1930–1983

Egon Eis (born Egon Eisler; 6 October 1910 – 6 September 1994) was an Austrian screenwriter. He wrote for nearly 50 films between 1930 and 1983. Eis was forced into exile during the Nazi era, but returned to work in the German film industry after the Second World War where he worked on the popular series of Edgar Wallace films as well as other projects. He was born in Vienna, Austria and died in Munich, Germany. His brother Otto Eis was also a screenwriter.

== Filmography ==
=== Screenwriter ===
- The Tiger Murder Case (dir. Johannes Meyer, 1930)
- The Shot in the Sound Film Studio (dir. Alfred Zeisler, 1930) — based on a novel by Curt Siodmak
- The Copper (dir. Richard Eichberg, 1930)
- Täter gesucht (dir. Carl Heinz Wolff, 1931) — based on a novel by Frank Arnau
- Das gelbe Haus des King-Fu (dir. Karl Grune, 1931) — based on a play by Josef Matthäus Velter
- The Yellow House of Rio (1931) (dir. Karl Grune, Robert Péguy, 1931) — based on a play by Josef Matthäus Velter
- Express 13 (dir. Alfred Zeisler, 1931)
- Tropical Nights (dir. Leo Mittler, 1931) — based on Victory by Joseph Conrad
- The Squeaker (dir. Karel Lamač, Martin Frič, 1931) — based on The Squeaker by Edgar Wallace
- Salto Mortale (dir. E. A. Dupont, 1931) — based on a novel by Alfred Machard
- The Paw (dir. Hans Steinhoff, 1931)
  - The Man with the Claw (dir. Nunzio Malasomma, 1931)
- A Shot at Dawn (dir. Alfred Zeisler, 1932) — based on a play by Harry Jenkins
  - Coup de feu à l'aube (dir. Serge de Poligny, 1932) — based on a play by Harry Jenkins
- Teilnehmer antwortet nicht (dir. Rudolph Cartier, Marc Sorkin, 1932)
- Caribbean Enchantment (dir. Juan Orol, 1947)
- Algo flota sobre el agua (dir. Alfredo B. Crevenna, 1948) — based on a novel by Lajos Zilahy
- La casa de la Troya (dir. Carlos Orellana, 1948) — based on a novel by Alejandro Pérez Lugín
- La dama del velo (dir. Alfredo B. Crevenna, 1949)
- El rencor de la tierra (dir. Alfredo B. Crevenna, 1949)
- Otra primavera (dir. Alfredo B. Crevenna, 1950) — based on a play by Rodolfo Usigli
- Huellas del pasado (dir. Alfredo B. Crevenna, 1950)
- Yo quiero ser tonta (dir. Eduardo Ugarte, 1950) — based on a play by Carlos Arniches
- Girls in Uniform (dir. Alfredo B. Crevenna, 1951) — remake of Mädchen in Uniform
- Doña Clarines (dir. Eduardo Ugarte, 1951) — based on a play by the Quintero brothers
- Woman Without Tears (dir. Alfredo B. Crevenna, 1951)
- Canasta uruguaya (dir. René Cardona, 1951)
- El puerto de los siete vicios (dir. Eduardo Ugarte, 1951)
- The Woman You Want (dir. Emilio Gómez Muriel, 1952)
- Prisionera del recuerdo (dir. Eduardo Ugarte, 1952)
- Women Who Work (dir. Julio Bracho, 1953)
- Victoria and Her Hussar (dir. Rudolf Schündler, 1954) — based on the operetta Viktoria und ihr Husar
- A House Full of Love (dir. Hans Schweikart, 1954) — based on the play Fräulein Fortuna by Ladislas Fodor
- The Phantom of the Big Tent (dir. Paul May, 1954)
- Der Frosch mit der Maske (dir. Harald Reinl, 1959) — based on The Fellowship of the Frog by Edgar Wallace
- The Crimson Circle (dir. Jürgen Roland, 1960) — based on The Crimson Circle by Edgar Wallace
- The Dead Eyes of London (dir. Alfred Vohrer, 1961) — based on The Dark Eyes of London by Edgar Wallace
- The Devil's Daffodil (dir. Ákos Ráthonyi, 1961) — based on The Daffodil Mystery by Edgar Wallace
- The Puzzle of the Red Orchid (dir. Helmut Ashley, 1962) — based on a novel by Edgar Wallace
- The Inn on the River (dir. Alfred Vohrer, 1962) — based on The India-Rubber Men by Edgar Wallace
- He Can't Stop Doing It (dir. Axel von Ambesser, 1962) — based on Father Brown stories by G. K. Chesterton
- The White Spider (dir. Harald Reinl, 1963) — based on a novel by Louis Weinert-Wilton
- The Inn on Dartmoor (dir. Rudolf Zehetgruber, 1964) — based on a novel by Victor Gunn
- Im Auftrag der schwarzen Front (dir. Ludwig Cremer, 1969, TV film)
- Die Kugel war Zeuge (dir. Rainer Söhnlein, 1974, TV film)
- Zwei Finger einer Hand (dir. Georg Marischka, 1975, TV film)
- Kennwort Schmetterling (dir. Claus Peter Witt, 1981, TV film)
- The Train Killer (dir. Sándor Simó, 1983)
- Ein Mann namens Parvus (dir. Rudolf Nussgruber, 1984, TV film)
- Die Stunde des Léon Bisquet (dir. Lutz Büscher, 1986, TV film) — based on a novel by Georges Simenon

=== Film adaptations ===
- Prison sans barreaux, directed by Léonide Moguy (1938, based on the play Gefängnis ohne Gitter)
- Prison Without Bars, directed by Brian Desmond Hurst (1938, based on the play Gefängnis ohne Gitter)
- Water for Canitoga, directed by Herbert Selpin (1939, based on the play Wasser für Canitoga)
- Prison Without Bars (1939, TV play, based on the play Gefängnis ohne Gitter)
- I Was a Prisoner on Devil's Island, directed by Lew Landers (1941, based on the story Southern Cross)
- Desires, directed by Rolf Hansen (1952, based on the play Das letzte Rezept)
- Dicke Luft, directed by Rolf von Sydow (1962, based on the story Der Midas von Mittelstadt)

== Plays ==
- Das letzte Rezept
- Der lächerliche Sir Anthony
- Wasser für Canitoga
- Neun Offiziere
- Gefängnis ohne Gitter
