= The Dark Eyes of London =

The Dark Eyes of London may refer to:

- The Dark Eyes of London (novel), a 1924 novel by Edgar Wallace
- The Dark Eyes of London (film), a 1939 British film

== See also ==
- The Dead Eyes of London, a 1961 German film known by this title
