= The Terrible People =

The Terrible People may refer to:

- The Terrible People (novel), a 1926 novel by Edgar Wallace
- The Terrible People (serial), a 1928 American silent film serial based on the novel
- The Terrible People (film), a 1960 West German film based on the novel
