= Der rote Kreis =

Der rote Kreis (German: The Crimson Circle) may refer to:

- The Crimson Circle (1929 film)
- The Crimson Circle (1960 film)
