= Otto Eis =

- Born: 19 March 1903; Budapest, Austro-Hungarian Empire
- Died: 14 January 1952 (aged 48); Los Angeles, California, U.S.
- Occupation: Writer
- Years active: 1931–1949 (film)
- Spouse: Madaline Eis
- Parent(s): Armin Eisler and Saranke Horowitz

Otto Eis (1903–1952) was an Austrian-born writer who worked on a number of screenplays. He was born Otto Eisler to a Jewish family in Budapest which was then part of the Austro-Hungarian Empire. He later moved to Germany, where he was employed in the German film industry. Following the Nazi seizure of power in 1933, he moved to Austria, but had to flee again to France following the Anchluss. Eis later moved to the United States, but struggled to secure work in Hollywood although he wrote scripts for a handful of B pictures. Eis was the brother of Egon Eis with whom he co-wrote the screenplay for The Squeaker (1931).

== Selected filmography ==
=== Screenwriter ===
- The Squeaker (dir. Karel Lamač, Martin Frič, 1931) — based on The Squeaker by Edgar Wallace
- The Paw (dir. Hans Steinhoff, 1931)
  - The Man with the Claw (dir. Nunzio Malasomma, 1931)
- A Shot at Dawn (dir. Alfred Zeisler, 1932) — based on a play by Harry Jenkins
  - Coup de feu à l'aube (dir. Serge de Poligny, 1932) — based on a play by Harry Jenkins
- Teilnehmer antwortet nicht (dir. Rudolph Cartier, Marc Sorkin, 1932)
- The Star of Valencia (dir. Serge de Poligny, 1933)
  - The Star of Valencia (dir. Alfred Zeisler, 1933)
- Big Jack (dir. Richard Thorpe, 1949)

=== Film adaptations ===
- Prison sans barreaux, directed by Léonide Moguy (1938, based on the play Gefängnis ohne Gitter)
- Prison Without Bars, directed by Brian Desmond Hurst (1938, based on the play Gefängnis ohne Gitter)
- Water for Canitoga, directed by Herbert Selpin (1939, based on the play Wasser für Canitoga)
- Prison Without Bars (1939, TV play, based on the play Gefängnis ohne Gitter)
- I Was a Prisoner on Devil's Island, directed by Lew Landers (1941, based on the story Southern Cross)
- Desires, directed by Rolf Hansen (1952, based on the play Das letzte Rezept)

== Bibliography ==
- Bergfelder, Tim. International Adventures: German Popular Cinema and European Co-Productions in the 1960s. Berghahn Books, 2005.
