= Madame Spy (1934 film) =

1934 film by Karl Freund

- Directed by: Karl Freund
- Screenplay by: William Hurlbut
- Story by: Johannes Brandt; Josef Than; Max W. Kimmich
- Based on: Under False Flag by Max W. Kimmich
- Produced by: Carl Laemmle, Jr.
- Starring: Fay Wray; Oscar Apfel; Edward Arnold; Nils Asther
- Cinematography: Norbert Brodine
- Edited by: David Berg
- Music by: Heinz Roemheld
- Production company: Universal Pictures
- Distributed by: Universal Pictures
- Release date: February 10, 1934
- Running time: 70 minutes
- Country: United States
- Language: English

Madame Spy is a 1934 American adventure film directed by Karl Freund and starring Fay Wray, Oscar Apfel, Edward Arnold and Nils Asther. The film was produced and distributed by Universal Pictures. It is a remake of the 1932 film Under False Flag which was produced by Deutsche Universal, the German subsidiary of the studio, and was itself based on a novel of the same title by Max W. Kimmich.

== Plot ==
Maria is married to Captain Franck of German Intelligence. He does not know she is a Russian assigned to spy on him. When he is told to uncover a leak, he vows revenge on his wife.

== Cast ==
- Fay Wray as Marie Franck
- Oscar Apfel as Pahlke
- Edward Arnold as Schultz
- Nils Asther as Capt. Franck
- Vince Barnett as Peter
- Noah Beery, Sr. as Gen. Philipow
- A.S. 'Pop' Byron as Chemist
- Eddy Chandler as Austrian Officer
- Stephen Chase as Petroskie
- Robert Ellis as Sulkin
- Ruth Fallows as Lulu
- Henry Gerbil as Austrian aviator
- Robert Graves as Detective
- Herbert Holcombe as Orderly
- Jerry Jerome as Russian aviator
- Rollo Lloyd as Baum
- Adrienne Marden as Woman
- John Miljan as Weber
- Philip Morris as Russian officer
- Reinhold Pasch as Dumb guy
- Edward Peil, Sr. as Garage owner
- Werner Plack as Conductor
- Ferdinand Schumann-Heink as Cafe owner
- Albert J. Smith as Lackey
- David Torrence as Seerfeldt
- Anders Van Haden as Detective
- Douglas Walton as Karl
- Arthur Wanzer as Chemist

== See also ==
- Under False Flag (1932)

== Bibliography ==
- Goble, Alan. The Complete Index to Literary Sources in Film. Walter de Gruyter, 1999.
