= Tropical Nights =

Tropical Nights or similar may refer to:

- Tropical Nights (1928 film), an American silent film directed by Elmer Clifton
- Tropical Nights (1931 film), an American German-language film directed by Leo Mittler
- Tropical Nights (album), by Liza Minnelli, 1977
- tropical night, in some countries, a night when the air temperature stays at or above 20°C
