= The Crimson Circle (1960 film) =

1960 film

- German poster
- The Crimson Circle; Den blodrøde cirkel
- Directed by: Jürgen Roland
- Written by: Egon Eis; Wolfgang Menge
- Based on: a novel by Edgar Wallace
- Produced by: Preben Philipsen
- Starring: Renate Ewert; Klausjürgen Wussow; Karl-Georg Saebisch
- Cinematography: Heinz Pehlke
- Edited by: Margot Jahn
- Music by: Willy Mattes
- Production companies: Rialto Film, Constantin Film
- Distributed by: Prisma Filmverleih
- Release date: 2 March 1960
- Running time: 92 minutes
- Countries: West Germany, Denmark
- Languages: German, Danish

The Crimson Circle (German: Der rote Kreis) is a 1960 West German/Danish black and white crime film directed by Jürgen Roland and starring Renate Ewert, Klausjürgen Wussow and Karl-Georg Saebisch. It was an adaptation of the 1922 novel The Crimson Circle by the British writer Edgar Wallace.

== Plot ==
Scotland Yard detectives pursue a ruthless league of blackmailers known as The Crimson Circle.

== Cast ==
- Renate Ewert as Thalia Drummond
- Klausjürgen Wussow as Derrick Yale
- Karl-Georg Saebisch as Inspector Parr
- Thomas Alder as Jack Beardmore
- Ernst Fritz Fürbringer as Sir Archibald Morton
- Erica Beer as Mrs. Carlyle
- Fritz Rasp as Froyant
- Eddi Arent as Sergeant Haggett
- Edith Mill as Lady Doringham
- Ulrich Beiger as Osborne
- Richard Lauffen as Marles
- Heinz Klevenow as Brabazon
- Alfred Schlageter as Mr Beardmore
- Panos Papadopulos as Sailor Selby
- Albert Watson as Sergeant Johnson
- Richard Grupe as James
- Karl-Heinz Peters as Executioner
- Friedrich Schütter as Henry Charles Lightman (and the masked head of the Crimson Circle)
- Alf Marholm as Prison warden
- Günter Hauer as Conductor
- Jürgen Roland as Policeman

== Production ==
A previous German/British adaptation of the novel The Crimson Circle by Edgar Wallace was made in 1929. Other versions were produced in the UK in 1922 and in 1936.

For this version, the second film in the Wallace series produced by Rialto, the novel was adapted for the screen by Egon Eis under his pen name "Trygve Larsen". Wolfgang Menge, a friend of the director, made some changes to the script. Director Jürgen Roland had not previously directed a feature film, but had made a name for himself by directing the TV series Stahlnetz.

Cinematography took place in November and December 1959. The studio for interiors was Palladium Atelier at Copenhagen. Exteriors were also shot at Kopenhagen. Stock footage from London shot during production of the previous film Der Frosch mit der Maske was used.

== Release ==
The FSK gave the film a rating of 16 years and up, unsuitable for screening on public holidays. It premiered on 2 March 1960 at the Unversum at Stuttgart.

The film's success encouraged the producers to meet with Penelope Wallace and secure the film rights for all available Wallace novels.

== See also ==
- The Crimson Circle (1922)
- The Crimson Circle (1929)
- The Crimson Circle (1936)
