= Artisten =

1935 film directed by Harry Piel

- Directed by: Harry Piel
- Starring: Hilde Hildebrand; Susi Lanner; Hans Junkermann; Louis Ralph; Bruno Ziener; Gustav Püttjer; Erich Walter; Harry Piel
- Cinematography: Ewald Daub
- Edited by: Hilde Grebner
- Music by: Fritz Wenneis
- Release date: 12 March 1935
- Running time: Germany: 107 min; USA: 90 min
- Country: Nazi Germany
- Language: German

Artisten (aka Harry Piel's 100. film or Prince of the arena) is a German circus movie from 1934 to 1935 starring Susi Lanner, Hans Junkermann, Hilde Hildebrand and Harry Piel, who also acted as director. The screenplay was written by Max W. Kimmich after the silent movie The secret of the circus Barré.

== Plot ==
The famous artist Harry Peters is working on his new vaudeville act at the "Tivoli" music hall. He is assisted by Hella Stoll, who is his foster daughter since her parents, friends of Harry, died years ago. At the premiere of his new act, Harry surprisingly meets his old friend Franz Hofer from Vienna, an agent who also knew Hella as a child. He recognizes immediately that the little girl from the past has turned into a pretty young lady who is deeply in love with her foster father. Harry himself seems to be quite unaware of that. Instead, he finds himself stalked by beautiful Vera Leander, who follows him everywhere. After much hesitation, Harry is so trapped by her that he not only disregards his job, but also neglects Hella. But after a nearly fatal accident during a dangerous showact, he comes to his senses again and wants to return to Hella. When he recognizes that she has disappeared from the music hall, he suspects she has run away with a magician called Morelli. Furiously, he starts looking for them. He finally finds Morelli backstage, just dyeing his hair. To Harry's surprise, the magician turns out to be a certain Baraloff, the business manager of circus Stoll, the travelling circus that belonged to Hella's parents. He had at that time run away after stealing all the money, and the following alarums and excursions had finally led to the fatal accident of Hella's parents. Now he can be arrested at last. Harry hands him over to the police and goes on looking for his foster daughter. Finally, he finds her at Hofer's flat, where they talk things out and in the end become a couple.

== Shooting ==
The film was produced within three weeks, from 7 December 1934 to the end of the month, by Berlin film company Ariel. Most interiors were shot at the company's studios in Berlin-Johannisthal, while the location shots were produced in Dresden and Berlin. In Dresden, Harry Peel had rented the giant building of the former circus Sarrasani. Parts of the scenes shot there were filmed publicly, and drew a big audience. The money that was collected this way was given to the Winterhilfswerk. Later on, the shooting was completed at Circus Busch in Berlin. The final movie passed censorship on 1 March 1935 and made its debut on 12 March. It was rated "artistically valuable" by film censors of the propaganda ministry. In 1963, it was shown on DFF, the TV broadcaster of the German Democratic Republic. Nine years later, in 1972, another TV version was broadcast by the West German ZDF.

== Sources ==
Klaus, Ulrich J.: German sound films. Encyclopedia of the full-length German speaking feature films, sorted by their first showings. / Ulrich J. Klaus. - Berlin [et al.]: Klaus-archive, 1935
