= The Mysterious Mirror =

1928 film directed by Carl Hoffmann

- Directed by: Carl Hoffmann; Richard Teschner
- Written by: Robert Reinert
- Starring: Fee Malten; Fritz Rasp; Rina De Liguoro; Eduard von Winterstein
- Cinematography: Carl Hoffmann
- Music by: Walter Winnig
- Production company: UFA
- Distributed by: UFA
- Release date: 21 March 1928
- Running time: 67 minutes
- Country: Germany
- Languages: Silent; German intertitles

The Mysterious Mirror (German: Der geheimnisvolle Spiegel), aka The Mystic Mirror is a 1928 German silent fantasy film directed by Carl Hoffmann and Richard Teschner, and starring Fee Malten, Fritz Rasp and Rina De Liguoro. The film was about a magic mirror which allowed the person looking into it to see his or her future, a theme that appeared similarly in the 1945 British horror film Dead of Night. The magazine Film und Volk, which was invariably hostile to UFA releases, described it as "about the limit of what an audience could be expected to tolerate in the way of stale Gothic Romance and unlikely psychology".

== Plot ==
A mirror in a creepy old Bavarian castle has the magical ability to reveal the future of whoever looks into it while the full moon shines brightly. A series of characters looks into the glass to learn their fate, and most are unhappy with what they learn. In the end, the hero smashes the glass and then commits suicide. After he is dead, the mirror magically reassembles itself into a whole as before.

== Cast ==
- Fee Malten as Anna
- Fritz Rasp as reicher Mann
- Rina De Liguoro as Freundin des reichen Mannes
- Eduard von Winterstein as Schloßverwalter
- Dante Cappelli as Schloßkastellan
- Wolf Albach-Retty as Bildhauer
- Max Magnus as Sein Freund
- Alice Kempen as Großmagd
- Heinrich Gretler as Großknecht

== Production ==
Co-director Hoffmann, being more of a cinematographer, was more at home handling the technical effects involved in filmmaking and preferred to allow a co-director (such as Teschner) to work with the actors. His career involved working on films with directors including Fritz Lang and F.W. Murnau. Actor Fritz Rasp played villains in a number of films including Metropolis and, in the 1960s, several German Edgar Wallace crime thrillers.

== Bibliography ==
- Kreimeier, Klaus. The Ufa Story: A History of Germany's Greatest Film Company, 1918–1945. University of California Press, 1999.
