= Three on a Honeymoon (1932 film) =

1932 film directed by Erich Schmidt

- Directed by: Erich Schmidt
- Written by: Gustav Holm; Ernst Marischka; Karl Meinhardt
- Starring: Brigitte Helm; Oskar Karlweis; Susi Lanner
- Cinematography: Jean Bachelet; Max Nekut
- Edited by: Marc Sorkin
- Music by: Walter Jurmann; Bronislau Kaper
- Production company: Mondial-Film
- Distributed by: Mondial-Film
- Release date: 29 December 1932 (Vienna)
- Running time: 92 minutes
- Country: Austria
- Language: German

Three on a Honeymoon (German: Hochzeitsreise zu dritt) is a 1932 Austrian comedy film directed by Erich Schmidt and starring Brigitte Helm, Oskar Karlweis and Susi Lanner. A separate French version Honeymoon Trip was also released a week later (on 6 January 1933).

The film's sets were designed by Artur Berger.

== Cast ==
- Brigitte Helm as Anita Berndt
- Oskar Karlweis as Heinz Schaller
- Susi Lanner as Susi Lechner
- Oskar Sima as Rudi Holzer
- Fritz Wiesenthal as Mayer
- Karl Ehmann as Johann, Diener
- Albert Feller as Gesang
- Darío Medina as Gesang

== Bibliography ==
- Bock, Hans-Michael & Bergfelder, Tim. The Concise Cinegraph: Encyclopaedia of German Cinema. Berghahn Books, 2009.
