= Moscow–Shanghai =

1936 film

- Directed by: Paul Wegener
- Written by: Kurt Heynicke; Max W. Kimmich
- Produced by: Vahayn Badal; Fritz Siemund
- Starring: Pola Negri; Gustav Diessl; Susi Lanner
- Cinematography: Franz Weihmayr
- Edited by: Munni Obal
- Music by: Hans-Otto Borgmann
- Production company: Badal-Film
- Distributed by: Terra Film
- Release date: 8 October 1936
- Running time: 90 minutes
- Country: Germany
- Language: German
- Budget: $200,000

Moscow–Shanghai (German: Moskau–Shanghai or Der Weg nach Shanghai) is a 1936 German drama film directed by Paul Wegener (in his final direction) and starring Pola Negri, Gustav Diessl and Susi Lanner. It was shot at the Babelsberg Studios in Berlin. The film's sets were designed by the art director Alfred Bütow and Willi Herrmann.

== Cast ==
- Pola Negri as Olga Petrowna
- Wolfgang Keppler as Alexander Repin
- Gustav Diessl as Serge Smirnow
- Susi Lanner as Maria
- Erich Ziegel as Gen. Martow
- Karl Dannemann as Grischa
- Hugo Werner-Kahle as Commander
- Paul Bildt as Gen. Nechludow
- Karl Meixner as Pope
- Rudolf Schündler as Galgenvogel
- Heinz Wemper as Commander in Karewo
- Franz Weilhammer as Railway chief
- Hanns Waschatko as General in Shanghai
- Dorothea Thiess as Mrs. Iwanowna
- Walter Gross as Manager in Shanghai
- Ernst Behmer as Bahnbeamter
- Aribert Grimmer as Train rebel
- Gustav Mahncke as Controller
- Edwin Jürgensen as Director of nitery
- Serge Jaroff as Choral conductor, Don Cossacks
- Elsa Wagner as Frau Iwanowna
- Charly Berger as Offizier beim Empfang in Moskau
- Walter Bischof as Flüchtling

== Bibliography ==
- Klaus, Ulrich J. Deutsche Tonfilme: Jahrgang 1936. Klaus-Archiv, 1988.
