= Robert Thoeren =

German screenwriter (1903–1957)

- Born: 21 April 1903; Brünn (Brno), Austro-Hungarian Empire
- Died: 13 July 1957 (aged 54); Munich, West Germany
- Occupations: Screenwriter, Film actor
- Years active: 1930 - 1957

Robert Thoeren (21 April 1903 – 13 July 1957) was a German screenwriter and film actor. Thoeren was born in Moravia, then part of the Austro-Hungarian Empire. After the First World War the German-speaking Thoeren emigrated to Germany where he became a theatre and film actor. Thoeren appeared in leading roles in several German-language films made by Paramount at the Joinville Studios in Paris.

Thoeren went into exile following the Nazi rise to power in 1933, first in France and later in the United States. Thoeren had already ceased acting and begun writing screenplays for films and became a top writer in the United States working with leading directors including Joseph Losey and William Dieterle. Thoeren returned to Germany after the Second World War and continued his career as a screenwriter. His story idea for the 1935 French film Fanfare of Love and its 1951 German remake Fanfares of Love was used as the basis for Billy Wilder's Some Like It Hot released in 1959, two years after his death.

He married the German actress Erica Beer in 1957, but died in the same year in a car crash.

== Selected filmography ==
=== Actor ===
- The Shot in the Sound Film Studio (1930)
- Tropical Nights (1931)
- Woman in the Jungle (1931)
- The Squeaker (1931)
- That's All That Matters (1931)

=== Screenwriter ===
- Les yeux noirs (1935)
- Fanfare of Love (1935)
- The Tamer (1938)
- Hotel Imperial (1939)
- Rage in Heaven (1941)
- Summer Storm (1944)
- Mrs. Parkington (1944)
- Temptation (1946)
- Singapore (1947)
- An Act of Murder (1948)
- The Fighting O'Flynn (1949)
- My Daughter Joy (1950)
- September Affair (1950)
- Fanfares of Love (1951)
- The Prowler (1951)
- Bandits of the Autobahn (1955)
- Sarajevo (1955)
- Between Time and Eternity (1956)
- Confessions of Felix Krull (1957)
- Petersburg Nights (1958)
- A Woman Who Knows What She Wants (1958)
- Some Like It Hot (1959)

== Bibliography ==
- Gemunden, Gerd. A Foreign Affair: Billy Wilder's American Films. Berghahn Books, 2008.
- Phillips, Gene D. Some Like It Wilder: The Life and Controversial Films of Billy Wilder. University Press of Kentucky, 2010.
