= Love's Joys and Woes =

1926 film

- Directed by: Kurt Gerron; Heinz Schall
- Written by: Helene Lackner
- Produced by: Martin Kopp
- Starring: Charlotte Susa; Margarete Kupfer; Hilde Maroff
- Cinematography: Arpad Viragh
- Production company: Kopp-Filmverleih
- Distributed by: Kopp-Filmverleih
- Release date: October 1926
- Country: Germany
- Languages: Silent; German intertitles

Love's Joys and Woes (German: Der Liebe Lust und Leid) is a 1926 German silent comedy film and directed by Kurt Gerron and Heinz Schall and starring Charlotte Susa, Margarete Kupfer and Hilde Maroff.

The film's art direction was by Karl Machus.

== Cast ==
- Charlotte Susa
- Margarete Kupfer
- Hilde Maroff
- Maria Forescu
- Emmy Wyda
- Marion Illing
- Grete Schmidt
- Sylvia Torf
- Hilda Pittschau
- Hans Mierendorff
- Ernst Rückert
- Fritz Rasp
- Kurt Gerron
- Charles Willy Kayser
- Hermann Picha
- Robert Garrison
- Ernst Behmer
- Ludwig Sachs
- Philipp Manning
- Antonie Jaeckel
- Albert Dettmann

== Bibliography ==
- Hans-Michael Bock and Tim Bergfelder. The Concise Cinegraph: An Encyclopedia of German Cinema. Berghahn Books, 2009.
