= Love Conquers All (1934 film) =

1934 film by Georg Zoch

- Directed by: Georg Zoch
- Written by: Sybille Pietzsch; Georg Zoch
- Starring: Trude Marlen; Susi Lanner; Jakob Tiedtke
- Cinematography: Ewald Daub
- Music by: Harald Böhmelt
- Production company: Westropa-Film
- Distributed by: Tobis Film
- Release date: 22 November 1934
- Country: Germany
- Language: German

Love Conquers All (German: Die Liebe siegt) is a 1934 German comedy film directed by Georg Zoch and starring Trude Marlen, Susi Lanner, and Jakob Tiedtke.

The film's sets were designed by the art director Erich Czerwonski.

== Plot ==
Advertising photographer Willy Schneider and musician Max Brehmer live poorly but contentedly under one roof, in a studio. When the caretaker Neumann wants to collect the rent, Willy is in a conversation with the advertising manager of the Berger Silk Syndicate, Döring. He would like to have some of his advertising photos to present to his boss, director Berger. At Herr Berger's domicile, he sees Renée Neumann, his property manager's daughter, who works as a shorthand typist in a car dealership, leaving the director's house. They both drive away together in their car, and they begin to fall in love. As a passionate photographer that he is, Willy naturally also takes a photo of Renée. The two lovebirds make an appointment for the following day in a café. The next day, however, Renée commits a faux pas, because she did not return the dress that her sister Elli had secretly borrowed for yesterday's visit in time, so that Elli, who needed the dress for an interview as a prospective singer in a theater, did not get the job she had hoped for got. In order to be at least useful for something, Elli wants to relieve her old father and now collect the urgently needed rent from Max and Willy. Elli gets to know Max and they both like each other. When Max finds out about Elli's mishap and the botched theater engagement, he wants to help her and says she should accompany him on his next engagement as a musician, he will somehow find a place for her in this variety show.

Meanwhile, Renée, who is supposed to look after old Seiden-Berger at her boss's car dealership, who is interested in a new car, is stopped by him, so that she misses her appointment with Willy in the café. The photographer is angry about this and, disappointed, leaves the photo of Renée, which was taken yesterday, to the Berger Group. Her likeness is promptly used for advertising purposes and will soon be emblazoned on all the city's posters, which makes Renée very angry and disappointed, because she really didn't expect that from her new acquaintance. Due to further complications, Willy soon feels deceived by his great love. He wants to reconcile with her, but fails completely. Father Neumann notices that Renée is also devastated and guesses the reason for this. When musician Max invites his friend Willy to his performance in the Odeon Theater, old Neumann also drags his daughter there. To his great surprise, he has to realize that daughter Elli is also present and is on stage with Max. Even more surprising for him is the information that Max and Elli have become engaged in the meantime. Now he can turn his full attention to the reconciliation work concerning Renée and Willy, but the two have long since found each other and cleared up all the misunderstandings.

== Cast ==
- Trude Marlen as Renée Neumann
- Susi Lanner as Elli, ihre Schwester
- Jakob Tiedtke as Ihr Vater
- Carl Esmond as Willy Schneider
- Rudolf Platte as Max, sein Freund
- Alfred Abel as Direktor Berger
- Blandine Ebinger as Annie, seine Frau
- Otto Krone as Hagemann, sein Sekretär
- Werner Finck as Döring, sein Reklamechef10
- Hadrian Maria Netto
- Valeska Stock
- Hermann Schröder
- Otto Sauter-Sarto
- Felicitas Scholz
- Annemarie Hase
- Antonie Jaeckel
- Emmy Wyda
- Josef Reithofer
- Erich Fiedler
- Hans Albin
- Inge Kadon
- Heinz Berghaus
- Ernst Legal
- Arthur Reppert
- Gustav Mahncke

== Bibliography ==
- Bock, Hans-Michael; Bergfelder, Tim, eds. (2009). The Concise Cinegraph: Encyclopaedia of German Cinema. New York: Berghahn Books. ISBN 978-1-57181-655-9.
