= Susi Lanner =

Austrian actress

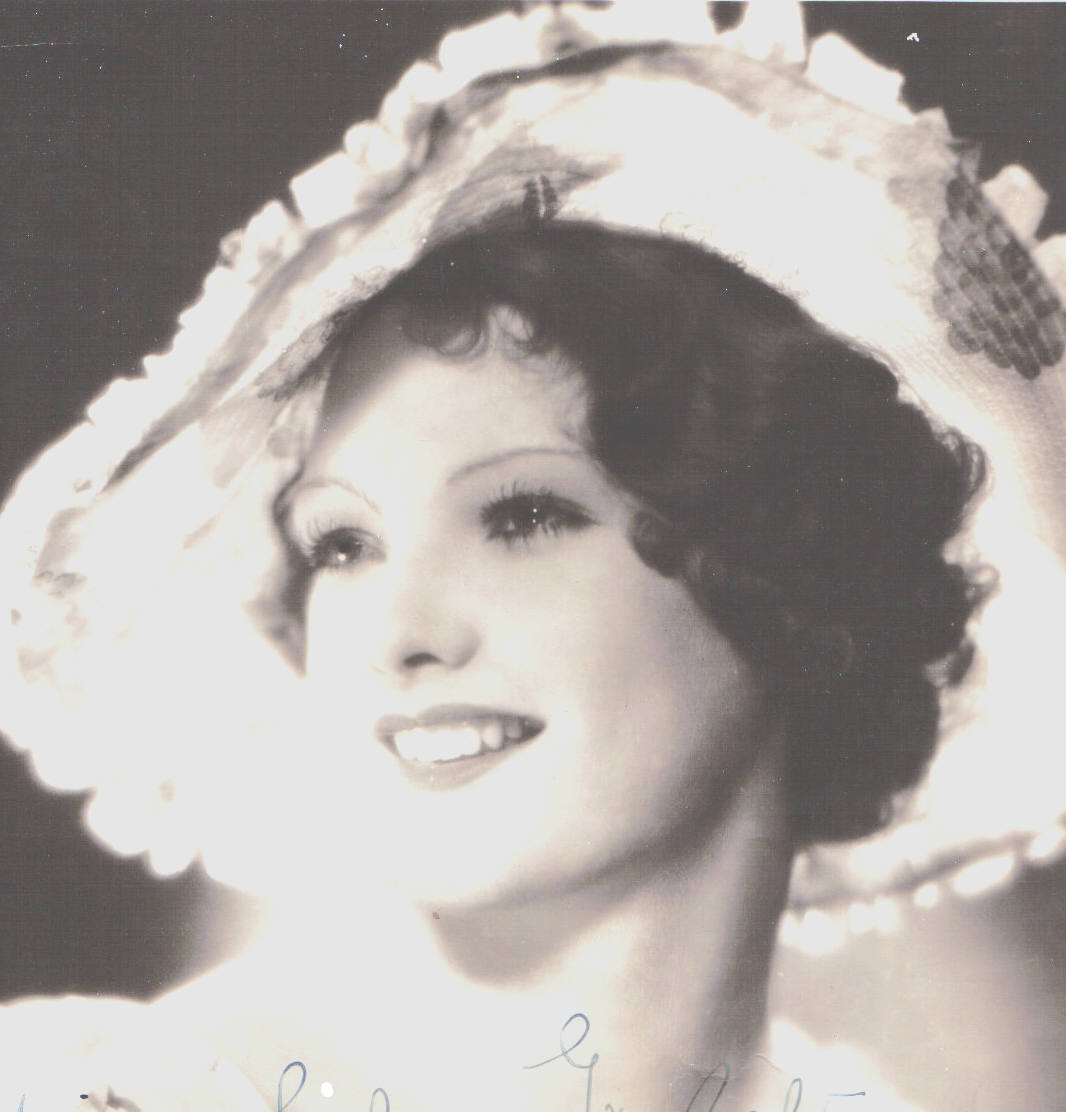

Susi Lanner (August 27, 1911 – March 16, 2006) was an Austrian film actress who played major roles in German productions from 1932 to 1937.

== Biography ==
Born Mechthilde Reif in Vienna, Austria, after schooling in drama, dance, and singing, Lanner appeared as a singer and dancer in operettas and revues in her native Vienna. She made her film debut in 1932 opposite Brigitte Helm and Oskar Karlweis in the comedy Three on a Honeymoon. Then she made a name for herself as a supporting actress, before she advanced to talented co-star at the side of Heinz Rühmann, Theo Lingen and Hans Moser. In her short film career she played lead roles opposite Harry Piel in Artisten, opposite Hans Söhnker in the drama Herbstmanöver (Autumn Maneuvers), and in Hans Deppe's comedy Meiseken as well as opposite Erik Ode in the comedy The Daring Swimmer, opposite the silent-film star Pola Negri in Paul Wegener's drama Moscow-Shanghai and opposite Heinz Rühmann in Robert A. Stemmle's comedy Heinz in the Moon. She also played in musicals such as The Last Waltz with Camilla Horn.

Shortly before Germany annexed Austria in 1938, she moved with her husband Roy Frazier Potts, an American businessman (Vice President of the New-York Overseas Corp.), to the United States and did not transplant her film career.

She died in Dobbs Ferry, New York.

== Selected filmography ==
- Three on a Honeymoon (1932)
- Adventures on the Lido (1933)
- Our Emperor (1933)
- Love Conquers All (1934)
- The Daring Swimmer (1934)
- Heinz in the Moon (1934)
- The Last Waltz (1934)
- Herbstmanöver (1935) (Autumn Maneuvers)
- Artisten (1935) (Artists)
- The King's Prisoner (1935)
- Game on Board (1936)
- Moscow-Shanghai (1936)
- Das Schönheitsfleckchen (1936) (The Beauty Mark)
- Ungeküsst soll man nicht schlafen gehn (1936) (You Shouldn't Go to Sleep Unkissed)
- Moscow-Shanghai (1936)
- Hahn im Korb (1937) (Rooster in the Basket)
- Meiseken (1937)
