= Karl-Georg Saebisch =

German actor

Karl-Georg Saebisch (1903–1984) was a German actor.

== Selected filmography ==
- The Last Man (1955) - Jonas, der Kellner (uncredited)
- The Man Who Sold Himself (1959) - Lawyer Longinus
- The Crimson Circle (1960) - Insp. Parr
- The Terrible People (1960) - Bankier Monkford / Lehrer Monkford
- 12 Angry Men (1963, TV film) - Juror 10
- Murderer in the Fog (1964) - Herr Auer
- Krankensaal 6 (1974) - Awerjanytsch
