= Under False Flag (1932 film) =

1932 film

- Directed by: Johannes Meyer
- Screenplay by: Johannes Brandt; Josef Than; Max W. Kimmich
- Based on: Under False Flag by Max W. Kimmich
- Produced by: Hans von Wolzogen; Max Wogritsch
- Starring: Charlotte Susa; Gustav Fröhlich; Friedrich Kayssler
- Cinematography: Otto Kanturek
- Edited by: Carl Otto Bartning
- Music by: Giuseppe Becce
- Production companies: Deutsche Universal-Film; Tobis Film
- Distributed by: Deutsche Universal-Film
- Release date: 12 February 1932
- Running time: 96 minutes
- Country: Germany
- Language: German

Under False Flag (German: Unter falscher Flagge) is a 1932 German spy thriller film directed by Johannes Meyer and starring Charlotte Susa, Gustav Fröhlich and Friedrich Kayssler. It was shot at the Johannisthal Studios in Berlin from the end of November 1931 to the beginning of 1932. It was made by Deutsche Universal, the German branch of Universal Pictures, in co-production with Tobis Film. The film's sets were designed by the art director Otto Hunte. It premiered at Berlin's Ufa-Palast am Zoo. The film was based on the novel of the same title by Max W. Kimmich, who also worked on the screenplay.

In 1934 Universal made an American remake Madame Spy in Hollywood with Fay Wray and Edward Arnold and directed by Karl Freund.

== Plot ==
Captain Herbert Frank (Gustav Fröhlich), a German intelligence officer, fights in World War I and gets severely wounded in 1916. While in hospital, he is cared for by a nurse called Maria Horn (Charlotte Susa). Later on, he asks her to become his wife, and she accepts. But just a few days after their wartime wedding, her husband is commanded to Berlin, where he is appointed to the chief of the counterintelligence service against Russia.

Meanwhile, the Russian secret service has got wind of a coming-up German attack and is eager to get hold of the German attack plans. Frank and his two assistants, Captain Weber and Inspector Schulz, soon find out that the most dangerous agent on the Russian side is a certain Sulkin, whom nobody seems to know. After a short time, Schulz and Weber begin throwing their suspicion on Maria. Not wanting to destroy their boss's marriage, they begin to observe her secretly. One day, they follow her to the Marabou bar, where Maria's brother is performing as a singer. Here they get final evidence that Maria and the mysterious Sulkin are identical. But Maria manages to escape, while her brother, whom she had informed about her work for the secret service, is killed by the Russian counterespionage. When Frank learns that his wife had been an enemy agent, he nearly collapses. Later on, he asks to be sent to the front on a suicide mission.

Meanwhile, Maria has returned to Russia. She feels remorse for abusing her husband's confidence and wants to make amends. In order not to lose her as an asset, her bosses lead her to believe that her brother was killed by Frank. Some time later, she accidentally meets Frank at a big ball in Russia where he is secretly collecting intelligence. First she wants to turn him in to the Russian secret service, but in the end he is able to convince her of his innocence in her brother's death. Now that she is convinced of his innocence, she helps him escape, but loses her life in the process.

== Cast ==
- Charlotte Susa as Maria Horn
- Gustav Fröhlich as Hauptmann Herbert Frank
- Friedrich Kayssler as Oberst Seefeldt
- Hermann Speelmans as Kriminalkommissar Schulz
- Ernst Dumcke as Hauptmannn Weber
- Joseph Almas as Blumenhändler Jahnke
- Gerhard Ritterband as Lehrling Peter
- Hans Brausewetter as Fred
- Hadrian Maria Netto as Direktor der Marabubar
- Elza Temary as Bardame Lilo
- Hedwig Wangel as Frl. Schmidt, Garderobiere
- Arthur Bergen as Bubi
- Theodor Loos as Rakowski
- Aribert Wäscher as General Fürst Urussow
- Harry Hardt as Hauptmann Sergei Petrovich
- Karl Hannemann as Garagenbesitzer
- Fritz Klippel as Monteur

== Bibliography ==
- Goble, Alan. The Complete Index to Literary Sources in Film. Walter de Gruyter, 1999.
- Klaus, Ulrich J.: German soundfilms. Film encyclopedia of full-length German and German-speaking sound films, sorted by their German first showings. - Ulrich J. Klaus / Berlin [et al.] - (Klaus-Archive, Vol. 3, 1932)
