= Babette Bomberling =

1927 film

- Margot Landa (centre) and Xenia Desni (right) in a scene from the film
- Directed by: Victor Janson
- Written by: Alice Berend (novel); Jane Bess; Bobby E. Lüthge
- Produced by: Alfred Sittarz
- Starring: Xenia Desni; Karl Elzer; Ferdinand Hart
- Cinematography: Otto Kanturek
- Music by: Werner R. Heymann
- Production company: Sittarz-Film
- Distributed by: National Film
- Release date: 4 April 1927
- Country: Germany
- Languages: Silent; German intertitles

Babette Bomberling (German: Die Bräutigame der Babette Bomberling) is a 1927 German silent comedy film directed by Victor Janson and starring Xenia Desni, Karl Elzer and Ferdinand Hart.

The film's art direction was by Jacek Rotmil.

== Cast ==
In alphabetical order
- Xenia Desni as Babette Bomberling
- Karl Elzer as Prill
- Ferdinand Hart as Seybold
- Bruno Kastner as Duce Spina-Spontelli
- Margot Landa as Hilde Werners
- Livio Pavanelli as Fritz Werners
- Hermann Picha as Schütte
- Lydia Potechina as Frau Bomberling
- Jakob Tiedtke as Der alte Bomberling
- Kurt Vespermann as Kippenbach jr.
- Ferdinand von Alten as Koberstein
- Egon von Jordan as Hermann Bomberling
- Hanni Weisse as Mucki
- Ida Wüst as Baronin Pryczibilzki-Razoska

== Bibliography ==
- Bock, Hans-Michael; Bergfelder, Tim, eds. (2009). The Concise Cinegraph: Encyclopaedia of German Cinema. New York: Berghahn Books. ISBN 978-1-57181-655-9.
