= Fritz Rasp =

German actor

- Born: Fritz Heinrich Rasp; 13 May 1891; Bayreuth, German Empire
- Died: 30 November 1976 (aged 85); Gräfelfing, West Germany
- Occupation: Actor
- Years active: 1909–1976

Fritz Heinrich Rasp (13 May 1891 – 30 November 1976) was a German film actor who appeared in more than 100 films between 1916 and 1976. His obituary in Der Spiegel described Rasp as "the German film villain in service, for over 60 years."

== Life and career ==
Fritz Heinrich Rasp was the thirteenth child of a county surveyor. He was educated from 1908–1909 at the Theaterschule Otto Königin in Munich. He made his stage debut in 1909, after he successfully overcame a speech impediment. During his long career, the character actor appeared in some of the most famous theatres in Germany, working with acclaimed directors such as Bertolt Brecht and Max Reinhardt and famous actors such as Albert Bassermann, Joseph Schildkraut and Werner Krauss. Rasp made an early film debut in 1916 and appeared in some early films by his friend, director Ernst Lubitsch. With his "gaunt, ascetic looks", Rasp played numerous scoundrels or shady characters during the Golden Age of German cinema in the 1920s. He is considered to be one of the most successful film villains in German film history.

Some of Rasp's more notable film roles were "J. J. Peachum" in The Threepenny Opera (1931), as the reckless seducer Meinert in Diary of a Lost Girl (1929), as Mr. Brocklehurst in Orphan of Lowood (1926), an early German adaptation of Jane Eyre, and as the bank robber Grundeis in Emil and the Detectives (1931). He also portrayed the mysterious "Der Schmale" ("The Thin Man") in Fritz Lang's Metropolis (1927). Many of the scenes in the latter film in which he appears are part of the Metropolis footage long believed lost until their recovery in 2008. In the 1960s, Rasp also appeared in numerous Edgar Wallace criminal films. In one of his last films, Bernhard Sinkel's comedy-drama Lina Braake (1975), Rasp starred against-type as a likable pensioner who steals money from an unscrupulous bank.

Fritz Rasp was awarded with the Filmband in Gold in 1963 for his outstanding work for the German film industry.

== Personal life ==
Fritz Rasp died of cancer at age 85 in Gräfelfing, where he is also buried. His son Andreas Rasp (1921–2013) was a Gymnasium teacher and poet. His daughter Renate Rasp (1935–2015) was a notable writer associated with Group 47.

== Selected filmography ==
- Shoe Palace Pinkus (1916)
- Hans Trutz in the Land of Plenty (1917)
- The Lost House (1922)
- Youth (1922) - Amandus
- Man by the Wayside (1923) - Farmhand
- Time Is Money (1923) - François
- Between Evening and Morning (1923)
- Warning Shadows (1923) - Diener
- Arabella (1924)
- Comedians (1925) - Jugendlicher Liebhaber
- Wood Love (1925) - Tom Snout
- The Doll of Luna Park (1925)
- Goetz von Berlichingen of the Iron Hand (1925)
- People of the Sea (1925)
- The House of Lies (1926) - Kandidat Molwik
- Torments of the Night (1926) - Kellner
- Love's Joys and Woes (1926)
- Superfluous People (1926) - Chirikov
- Orphan of Lowood (1926) - Brocklehurst
- Metropolis (1927) - Der Schmale / The Thin Man
- Children's Souls Accuse You (1927) - Heinrich Voss - Enzenbergs Sekretär
- The Last Waltz (1927) - Linnsky, Hofmarschall
- The Love of Jeanne Ney (1927) - Khalibiev
- The Prince of Rogues (1928) - Heinrich Benzel
- The Mysterious Mirror (1928) - reicher Mann
- Spione (1928) - Col. Jellusic - Ivan Stepanov, English version
- Docks of Hamburg (1928) - The doctor
- The Hound of the Baskervilles (1929) - Stapleton
- Diary of a Lost Girl (1929) - Meinert
- Woman in the Moon (1929) - Der Mann, der sich Walter Turner nennt
- Three Around Edith (1929) - Pistol
- Spring Awakening (1929) - Lehrer Habebald
- The Dreyfus Case (1930) - Maj. DuPatay de Clam
- The Great Longing (1930) - Himself
- The Murderer Dimitri Karamazov (1931) - Smerdjakoff
- The Threepenny Opera (1931) - Peachum
- Tropical Nights (1931) - Jones
- The Squeaker (1931) - Frank Sutton
- The Paw (1931) - Dr. Ing. Rappis
- Emil and the Detectives (1931) - Grundeis
- The Four from Bob 13 (1932) - Schmidt
- The Cruel Mistress (1932) - Professor Bock
- The Ringer (1932) - Maurice Meister
- Der sündige Hof (1933) - Veit, der Schäfer
- The Judas of Tyrol (1933) - Raffl
- Grenzfeuer (1934) - Nothaas - Grenzhofbauer
- Schuß am Nebelhorn (1934) - Sebastian Geyer, Forstgehilfe
- Charley's Aunt (1934) - Lord Babberley
- Little Dorrit (1934) - Flintwinch
- Decoy (1934) - de Groot, ihr Vormund
- Asew (1935) - Lockspitzel Asew
- The Emperor's Candlesticks (1936) - Stanislaus
- Uncle Bräsig (1936) - Slusohr, ein Gauner
- The Hound of the Baskervilles (1937) - Barrymore
- Togger (1937) - Dublanc
- Einmal werd' ich Dir gefallen (1938) - Theo - Haushofmeister
- So You Don't Know Korff Yet? (1938) - Kelley
- The Life and Loves of Tschaikovsky (1939) - Porphyr Philippowitsch Kruglikow, Kritiker
- Woman in the River (1939) - Wendelin
- Passion (1940) - Boddin
- Alarm (1941) - Feinmechaniker Stülken
- Paracelsus (1943) - Der Magister
- Somewhere in Berlin (1946) - Waldemar Hunke
- Scandal at the Embassy (1950) - Inspector Kick
- House of Life (1952) - Der Verführer (uncredited)
- Hocuspocus (1953) - Diener
- The Mill in the Black Forest (1953)
- The Cornet (1955) - Großwesir
- Magic Fire (1956) - Pfistermeister
- Der Frosch mit der Maske (1959) - Ezra Maitland
- The Crimson Circle (1960) - Froyant
- The Terrible People (1960) - Lord Godley Long
- The Black Sheep (1960) - Lord Kingsley
- The Strange Countess (1961) - Lawyer Shaddle
- The Puzzle of the Red Orchid (1962) - Tanner
- Black-White-Red Four Poster (1962) - Pfarrer / Parson
- Erotikon (1963) - Der Schloßverwalter
- Praetorius (1965) - Shunderson
- Lina Braake (1975) - Gustaf Haertlein
- Dorothea Merz (1976, TV film) - Der alte Merz
