= Express 13 =

1931 film

- Directed by: Alfred Zeisler
- Written by: Rudolph Cartier; Egon Eis
- Starring: Charlotte Susa; Heinz Könecke; Fee Malten
- Cinematography: Werner Brandes; Bernhard Wentzel
- Production company: UFA
- Distributed by: UFA
- Release date: 14 May 1931
- Running time: 73 minutes
- Country: Germany
- Language: German

Express 13 (German: D-Zug 13 hat Verspätung) is a 1931 German thriller film directed by Alfred Zeisler and starring Charlotte Susa, Heinz Könecke and Fee Malten. It was shot at UFA's Babelsberg Studios in Berlin. The film's sets were designed by Willi Herrmann and Herbert Lippschitz.

== Synopsis ==
Revolutionaries plot to assassinate a president by blowing up the rail tracks in order make his train derail but this is averted just in time. Herbert Schmitt, a passenger on a nearby express train becomes mixed up with the attractive Dorit who wants to use him to help launch a second attempt to kill the president.

== Cast ==
- Charlotte Susa as Dorit
- Heinz Könecke as Herbert Schmitt
- Fee Malten as Ella, seine Frau
- Ludwig Andersen as Der feine Urban
- Alfred Beierle as Caspar
- Viktor Schwanneke as Terry

== Bibliography ==
- Paech, Anne; Paech, Joachim (2000). Menschen im Kino: Film und Literatur erzählen. J.B. Metzler. ISBN 978-3-476-01747-5.
