= Spies at the Savoy Hotel =

1932 film

- Directed by: Frederic Zelnik
- Written by: Frederic Zelnik
- Produced by: Frederic Zelnik
- Starring: Alfred Abel; Olga Tschechowa; Margot Landa
- Cinematography: Reimar Kuntze
- Edited by: Friedel Buckow
- Music by: Otto Stransky
- Production companies: Friedrich Zelnick-Film; Efzet-Film
- Distributed by: Siegel-Monopolfilm
- Release date: 4 November 1932
- Running time: 80 minutes
- Country: Germany
- Language: German

Spies at the Savoy Hotel (German: Spione im Savoy-Hotel) is a 1932 mystery musical comedy film directed by Frederic Zelnik and starring Alfred Abel, Olga Tschechowa and Margot Landa. It functions as a revue style film, of the sort popular during the early sound era. Released in the final months of the Weimar Republic, the director and the several performers were forced into exile following the Nazi takeover the following year. It was shot at the Halensee Studios in Berlin. The film's sets were designed by the art director Gustav A. Knauer. It is also known by the alternative title The Gala Performance.

== Synopsis ==
British diplomat Palmer is in Berlin on a secret mission which takes him to a cabaret performance at the Hotel Savoy. During the show secret documents are stolen from him. Amongst the possible suspects are Miss Harris, a femme fatale spy he has encountered.

== Cast ==
- Alfred Abel as Mr. Palmer
- Reinhold Bernt as Schrott, sein Sekretär
- Olga Tschechowa as Miß Harris
- Leonard Steckel as Almassy, Antiquitätenhändler
- Karl Harbacher as Francois, Faktotum
- Leo Peukert as Der Hoteldirektor
- Eugen Rex as Der Hoteldetektiv
- Max Adalbert as Wengert
- Margot Landa as Susi Wengert, seine Tochter
- Walter Slezak as Kurt
- Karel Stepanek as Jackson
- Arthur Hell as Paul
- Hellmut Kraus as Der Hotelsekretär
- Martin Jacob as Ein junger Mann
- Gerhard Dammann as Ein Chauffeur
- Henry Pleß as Der Varieté-Direktor
- Ernst Behmer as Ein Inspizient
- Emmy Wyda as Eulalia Schulz
- Erich Kestin as Gottlieb
- Gustavo Fratellini as Self - Clown
- Max Fratellini as Self - Clown
- Gino Colombo as Self - Clown
- Comedian Harmonists as Themselves
- Alfred Braun as Alfred Braun, der rasende Reporter

== Bibliography ==
- Bock, Hans-Michael & Bergfelder, Tim. The Concise CineGraph. Encyclopedia of German Cinema. Berghahn Books, 2009.
- Klaus, Ulrich J. Deutsche Tonfilme: Jahrgang 1932. Klaus-Archiv, 1988.
- Waldman, Harry. Nazi Films in America, 1933-1942. McFarland, 2008.
- Wiegand, Daniel (ed.) Aesthetics of Early Sound Film: Media Change Around 1930. Taylor & Francis, 2025.
