= Do You Know That Little House on Lake Michigan? =

1929 film

- Directed by: Max W. Kimmich
- Written by: Max W. Kimmich
- Starring: Margot Landa; Václav Norman; Sasa Dobrovolná
- Cinematography: Franz Weihmayr
- Production companies: Gloriafilm; Liga-Film
- Distributed by: Gloriafilm
- Release date: 20 September 1929
- Countries: Czechoslovakia; Germany
- Languages: Silent; German intertitles

Do You Know That Little House on Lake Michigan? (German: Kennst du das kleine Haus am Michigansee?) is a 1929 Czech-German silent film directed by Max W. Kimmich and starring Margot Landa, Václav Norman, and Sasa Dobrovolná. The film's action takes place in the United States.

== Cast ==
- Margot Landa as Dorotka
- Václav Norman as Petr Seymour
- Sasa Dobrovolná as Petr's Mother
- Karel Hašler as Kennedy
- Bozena Svobodová as Kennedy's Wife
- Paul Vincenti as Teddy
- Anita Janová as Natalie Kingstonová
- Lydia Potechina as Natalie's Aunt
- Jarmila Kronbauerová as Alice
- Josef Sládek as Kennedy's Servant
- Milka Balek-Brodská as Dorotka's Aunt
- Karel Schleichert as Servant

== Bibliography ==
- Connelly, Mark (2012). The IRA on Film and Television: A History. Jefferson, NC: McFarland. ISBN 978-0-7864-4736-7.
