= The Crimson Circle (1936 film) =

1936 British film by Reginald Denham

- Directed by: Reginald Denham
- Written by: Edgar Wallace (novel); Howard Irving Young
- Produced by: Richard Wainwright
- Starring: Hugh Wakefield; Alfred Drayton; Noah Beery; June Duprez
- Cinematography: Philip Tannura
- Production company: Richard Wainwright Productions
- Distributed by: Universal Pictures
- Release dates: 26 March 1936 (trade show); 10 July 1936 (London opening)
- Running time: 76 minutes
- Country: United Kingdom
- Language: English

The Crimson Circle is a 1936 British crime film directed by Reginald Denham and starring Hugh Wakefield, Alfred Drayton, Noah Beery and June Duprez. It is based on the 1922 novel The Crimson Circle by Edgar Wallace. It was made by the independent producer Richard Wainwright at Shepperton and Welwyn Studios.

== Plot ==
Detectives at Scotland Yard try to track down The Crimson Circle, a secret society of blackmailers.

== Cast ==
- Hugh Wakefield as Derrick Yale
- Alfred Drayton as Inspector Parr
- Noah Beery as Felix Marl
- June Duprez as Sylvia Hammond
- Niall MacGinnis as Jack Beardmore
- Renee Gadd as Millie MacRoy
- Basil Gill as James Beardmore
- Paul Blake as Sergeant Webster
- Gordon McLeod as Brabazon
- Ralph Truman as Lawrence Fuller
- Robert Rendel as Commissioner
- William Hartnell as drunk at theatre bar (uncredited)

== Earlier versions ==
There had previously been a British silent version in 1922, followed seven years later by an Anglo-German co-production. The latter, produced in the De Forest Phonofilm sound-on-film system, was trade-shown in London in March 1929, along with an early sound version of Wallace's The Clue of the New Pin.

== Critical reception ==
"Well constructed, the action is developed at [a] good rate. Plenty of comedy, thrills, and suspense rounded off by [a] surprise climax. ... Reginald Denham’s direction is decisive, a good job of work. The production reveals care and cash well spent, whilst Phil Tannura’s photography is excellent all through. The scenarist and the cutter also deserve recognition. The team-work of the above-named, as much as the acting ... makes this an ideal picture for any British audience." The Era, 1 April 1936

"Hugh Wakefield as Yale and Alfred Drayton as Parr carry most of the burden of the film, and are completely convincing; an outstanding example of good team work. ... The familiar hokum is put over with zest and in the right key, but the story follows too well-worn a groove to sustain interest throughout for any but unsophisticated audiences, although in the final scenes a sufficient degree of suspense is attained." Kinematograph Weekly, 2 April 1936

"In The Crimson Circle at the Empire Theatre [Leicester Square] we have murder on a wholesale scale according to one of the best stories Edgar Wallace ever wrote, and I am sorry to say that the entertainment is not like the murder. This story should have made a grand film, but it has been made so stodgy that I am afraid it will not hold your interest. That is a pity, because Hugh Wakefield is an actor who might be a very great film star, and here he has to fight a film which gives him away almost from the moment he appears." Sunday Mirror, 12 July 1936

"After the first five minutes or so of the Globe's current thriller from England, it may occur to you that the title, The Crimson Circle, is a matter of slight understatement. Please remember, then, that this is an Inspector Parr story, and that British producers do not presume to change Edgar Wallace titles, no matter how much more fitting something like The Gory Horde may seem. Anyway, after the first five minutes you will become reconciled to this omnibus of 'omicide, remembering, if you know your Edgar Wallace, that a dozen murders is about Parr for the course." The New York Times, 28 December 1936

== Bibliography ==
- Low, Rachael. Filmmaking in 1930s Britain. George Allen & Unwin, 1985.
- Wood, Linda. British Films, 1927-1939. British Film Institute, 1986.
