= The Devil's Daffodil =

1961 film by Ákos Ráthonyi

- British quad poster
- Directed by: Ákos Ráthonyi
- Written by: Basil Dawson; Egon Eis
- Based on: the novel The Daffodil Mystery by Edgar Wallace
- Produced by: Steven Pallos; Donald Taylor
- Starring: William Lucas; Joachim Fuchsberger; Christopher Lee
- Cinematography: Desmond Dickinson
- Edited by: Peter Taylor
- Music by: Keith Papworth
- Production companies: Omnia Pictures Ltd., Rialto Film
- Distributed by: Prisma Filmverleih
- Release date: 17 August 1961
- Running time: 97 minutes
- Countries: United Kingdom; West Germany
- Languages: English; German

The Devil's Daffodil (also known as Daffodil Killer or German: Das Geheimnis der gelben Narzissen/ Secret of the Yellow Daffodils) is a 1961 British-West German black-and-white crime film directed by Ákos Ráthonyi. The film was produced in an English and a German version, starring different actors in the lead roles but otherwise featuring an almost identical cast and crew. It starred William Lucas in the English version and Joachim Fuchsberger in the German one.

== Cast ==
| Actor British version | Role | Actor German version |
|---|---|---|
| William Lucas | Jack Tarling | Joachim Fuchsberger |
| Penelope Horner | Anne Rider | Sabina Sesselmann |
| Ingrid van Bergen | Gloria Lyne | Ingrid van Bergen |
| Albert Lieven | Raymond Lyne | Albert Lieven |
| Jan Hendriks | Charles | Jan Hendriks |
| Marius Goring | Oliver Milburgh | Marius Goring |
| Peter Illing | Mr. (Jan) Putek | Peter Illing |
| Walter Gotell | Supt. Whiteside | Walter Gotell |
| Christopher Lee | Ling Chu | Christopher Lee |
| Colin Jeavons | Peter Keene | Klaus Kinski |

== Production ==
The film is based on the novel The Daffodil Mystery by Edgar Wallace. It was adapted for film by Egon Eis. The screenplay was written by Basil Dawson and Donald Taylor. The German dialogue was written by Horst Wendlandt and Gerhard F. Hummel. Wendlandt was also co-producer along with Preben Philipsen (both of Rialto Film).

Cinematography took place in April and May 1961 in London and environments. The studio was Shepperton Studios/Middlesex.

== Reception ==
In Germany, the FSK gave the film a rating of "16 and up" and found it not appropriate for screenings on public holidays. The German version premiered on 21 July 1961.

== See also ==
- Christopher Lee filmography
