= Squeaker =

Squeaker may refer to:

- Arthroleptidae, a frog family
- Squeaker (fish), Synodontis, a catfish genus
- A young wild boar
- The Squeaker (disambiguation), multiple uses
- Squeaker, the noisemaker in a squeaky toy
- Squeaker, another name for a party horn
