= Meiseken =

1937 film

- Directed by: Hans Deppe
- Written by: Anderl Kern; Max Wallner
- Based on: Meiseken by Hans Alfred Kihn
- Produced by: Karl Gillmore; Otto Lehmann
- Starring: Josef Eichheim; Susi Lanner; Oskar Sima
- Cinematography: Georg Muschner; Paul Rischke
- Edited by: Wolfgang Becker
- Music by: Walter Sieber
- Production company: Fabrikation Deutscher Filme
- Distributed by: Neue Deutsch Lichtspiel-Syndikat Verleih
- Release date: 27 May 1937
- Running time: 87 minutes
- Country: Germany
- Language: German

Meiseken is a 1937 German drama film directed by Hans Deppe and starring Josef Eichheim, Susi Lanner and Oskar Sima. It is based on the play Meiseken by Hans Alfred Kihn. The film's sets were designed by the art directors Robert A. Dietrich and Artur Günther.

== Cast ==
- Josef Eichheim as Alois Brüggler, Kleinbauer
- Rotraut Richter as Hedwig, Brügglers Enkelin
- Susi Lanner as Ursula Meiseken
- Franz Zimmermann as Toni Hämmerlein, Direktor
- Fritz Kampers as Sebastian Huber, Gastwirt
- Irmgard Hoffmann as Resi Huber, Gastwirtin
- Oskar Sima as Aulinger, Handwerker
- Maria Wolf as Vevi, Magd
- Beppo Brem as Michel, Knecht
- Albert Karchow as Hämmerleins Abteilungsdirektor
- Klaus Pohl as Hämmerleins Abteilungsdirektor
- Josef Reithofer as Hämmerleins Abteilungsdirektor
- Ewald Wenck as Hämmerleins Abteilungsdirektor
- Leo Peukert as Hämmerleins Bürodiener
- Josef Berger as Gendarm
- Arnulf Schröder as Finanzbeamter
- Franz Fröhlich as Feuerwehrhauptmann
- Helen Fichtmüller as Hämmerleins Sekretärin Frl. Hoffmann
- Michael Distler as Beschwipster Bauernbursche
- Walter Schuller as Beschwipster Bauernbursche

== Bibliography ==
- Goble, Alan. The Complete Index to Literary Sources in Film. Walter de Gruyter, 1999.
- Niven, Bill, Hitler and Film: The Führer's Hidden Passion. Yale University Press, 2018.
