= Yo quiero ser tonta =

- Film poster
- Directed by: Eduardo Ugarte
- Written by: Manuel Altolaguirre; Egon Eis; Carlos León; Eduardo Ugarte
- Based on: Las estrellas, a 1904 play by Carlos Arniches
- Produced by: Manuel Altolaguirre
- Starring: Sara García; Fernando Soler; Rosita Quintana; Ángel Garasa
- Cinematography: Ezequiel Carrasco
- Edited by: Rafael Portillo
- Music by: Federico Ruiz
- Release date: 30 November 1950 (Mexico)
- Running time: 73 minutes
- Country: Mexico
- Language: Spanish

Yo quiero ser tonta ("I Want to be a Fool") is a 1950 Mexican comedy-drama film producer, written directed by Eduardo Ugarte, and starring Sara García, Fernando Soler, Rosita Quintana and Ángel Garasa.

== Plot ==
A father dreams of his son becoming a bullfighter and his daughter a singer, so that they become millionaires, although apparently their talent is not there.

== Cast ==
- Sara García
- Rosita Quintana
- Gustavo Rojo
- Fernando Soler

== Production ==
The film is based on the musical comedy Las estrellas, by Carlos Arniches. The adaptation was the work of the director and Manuel Altolaguirre. The film is the first of their production company Producciones Isla. The book Tinta, papel, nitrato y celuloide lists it among the notable examples of adaptations of literary works typical of the Golden Age of Mexican cinema.

The art direction was led by Jésus Bracho.
