= Game on Board =

1936 film

- Directed by: Herbert Selpin
- Written by: Axel Ivers (play); Herbert Selpin; Walter Zerlett-Olfenius
- Produced by: Martin Pichert
- Starring: Viktor de Kowa; Susi Lanner; Alfred Abel
- Cinematography: Bruno Timm
- Edited by: Alexandra Anatra
- Music by: Michael Jary; Heinrich Strecker
- Production company: Neucophon Tonfilm-Produktion
- Distributed by: Terra Film
- Release date: 3 November 1936
- Running time: 82 minutes
- Country: Germany
- Language: German

Game on Board (German: Spiel an Bord) is a 1936 German comedy crime film directed by Herbert Selpin and starring Viktor de Kowa, Susi Lanner and Alfred Abel. Location shooting took place in Bremerhaven and New York and on the Atlantic crossing of the ocean liner SS Bremen. Interior scenes were shot at the Tempelhof Studios in Berlin. The film's sets were designed by the art director Erich Czerwonski.

== Synopsis ==
Young chauffeur Viktor boards an ocean liner as a stowaway on an Atlantic crossing to America. A series of mistaken identities follow as he is confused for a millionaire travelling incognito, and is also able to thwart the schemes of two fraudsters on board.

== Cast ==
- Viktor de Kowa as Viktor Müller
- Susi Lanner as Susanne Rauh, Sekretärin
- Alfred Abel as I. C. Corner, Konzernchef
- Carsta Löck as Fräulein Distelmann, Politesse
- Jakob Tiedtke as Herr Henning
- Erika Bert as Astrid, seine Tochter
- Hubert von Meyerinck as Marquis de la Tours, ein Betrüger
- Paul Heidemann as Baron von Western, sein Komplize
- Ernst Waldow as Corner Sekretär Black
- Günther Lüders as Matrose
- Erich Fiedler as Obersteward
- Hans Joachim Schaufuß as Boy Horst
- Edith Meinhard as erste Bewerberin für den Sekretärinposten
- Max Wilmsen as Hafenarbeiter
- Fritz Draeger as Steward
- Lothar Devaal as Steward
- Curt Lauermann as Besatzungsmitglied
- Jutta von Remsky as zweite Bewerberin für den Sekretärinposten
- Curt de Planque as Tänzer im Speisesaal
- Ferdinand Robert as Passagier im Speisesaal
- Klaus Seiwert as Passagier im Speisesaal
- Ernst Stimmel
- Flora Berthold

== Bibliography ==
- Bock, Hans-Michael; Bergfelder, Tim, eds. (2009). The Concise Cinegraph: Encyclopaedia of German Cinema. Berghahn Books. ISBN 978-1-57181-655-9.
