= Desires (film) =

1952 film

- Film poster
- Directed by: Rolf Hansen
- Written by: Hans Joachim Beyer; Juliane Kay; Tibor Yost
- Based on: Desires by Otto Eis and Egon Eis
- Produced by: Heinrich Jonen; Friedrich A. Mainz
- Starring: Heidemarie Hatheyer; O.W. Fischer; Sybil Werden; René Deltgen
- Cinematography: Franz Weihmayr
- Edited by: Anna Hollering
- Music by: Mark Lothar
- Production company: Meteor-Film
- Distributed by: Ring-Film-Verleih
- Release date: 14 March 1952
- Running time: 97 minutes
- Country: West Germany
- Language: German

Desires or The Last Prescription (German: Das Letzte Rezept) is a 1952 West German drama film directed by Rolf Hansen and starring Heidemarie Hatheyer, O.W. Fischer, Sybil Werden and René Deltgen. The film is based on a play of the same title by Otto Eis and Egon Eis, written under the pen name of Thomas B. Foster. It was shot at the Wiesbaden Studios and on location at the Salzburg Festival in Austria. The film's sets were designed by the art directors Paul Markwitz and Fritz Maurischat. It was entered into the 1952 Cannes Film Festival.

== Synopsis ==
At the Salzburg Festival, the morphine-addicted prima ballerina Bozena Boroszi needs a hit of drugs to perform, but doctor Steininger refuses to give her any unless she goes into rehabilitation. She instead attempts to seduce pharmacist Hans Falkner, stealing morphine from his cabinet when he is distracted. Steininger, an old love rival for Falkner's wife Anna, wrongly believes that he has given her the morphine.

== Cast ==
- Heidemarie Hatheyer as Anna Falkner
- O.W. Fischer as Hans Falkner
- Sybil Werden as Bozena Boroszi
- René Deltgen as Dr. med. Steininger
- Carl Wery as Sanitätsrat Dr. Falkner
- Hilde Körber as Fanny
- Liesl Karlstadt as Frau Berger
- Harald Paulsen as Brendel
- Iván Petrovich as Direktor Wallberg
- Heini Göbel as Verdächtiger Herr
- Bobby Todd as Theaterinspizient

== Bibliography ==
- Goble, Alan. The Complete Index to Literary Sources in Film. Walter de Gruyter, 1999.
