= Diary of a Coquette =

1929 film

- Directed by: Constantin J. David
- Written by: Hans Wilhelm; Henry Koster
- Produced by: Seymour Nebenzal
- Starring: Fee Malten; Ernst Stahl-Nachbaur; Alfred Döderlein; Paul Henckels
- Cinematography: Hans Karl Gottschalk
- Production company: Nero Film
- Distributed by: Star Film
- Release date: 22 March 1929
- Country: Germany
- Languages: Silent; German intertitles

Diary of a Coquette (German:Tagebuch einer Kokotte) is a 1929 German silent drama film directed by Constantin J. David and starring Fee Malten, Ernst Stahl-Nachbaur and Alfred Döderlein.

== Cast ==
- Fee Malten as Susanne Plarot
- Ernst Stahl-Nachbaur as Konsul Hechenberg
- Alfred Döderlein as Sein Sohn Helmuth
- Paul Henckels as Plarot, Susannes Vater
- Walter Hasenclever as Sekretär des Konsuls
- Ossip Runitsch as Hoteldirektor Lambert
- Mary Kid as Lucie, ein Strassenmädel
- Hella Kürty as Lotte, Lucies Freundin
- Mathias Wieman as Arzt
- Ida Wüst as Nachbarin
- Alexandra Schmitt as Ladenbesitzerin
- Marianne Moudjalet as Kind

== Bibliography ==
- Bock, Hans-Michael & Bergfelder, Tim. The Concise CineGraph. Encyclopedia of German Cinema. Berghahn Books, 2009.
