= Doña Clarines =

- Directed by: Eduardo Ugarte
- Written by: Joaquín Álvarez Quintero (play); Serafín Álvarez Quintero (play); Egon Eis; Carlos León
- Produced by: Manuel Altolaguirre
- Starring: Sara García, Ricardo Adalid, Lupe Carriles
- Cinematography: Rosalío Solano
- Edited by: Rafael Portillo
- Music by: Rosalío Ramírez, Federico Ruiz
- Release date: 25 April 1951 (Mexico)
- Country: Mexico
- Language: Spanish

Doña Clarines is a 1951 Mexican film adapted from the play by Joaquín Álvarez Quintero and Serafín Álvarez Quintero. It stars Sara García.

== Cast ==
- Sara García - Clara Urrutia 'Doña Clarines'
- Ricardo Adalid
- Lupe Carriles
- Felipe de Flores
- José Escanero
- José Luis Fernández
- Ángel Garasa
- Carmelita González
- Yadira Jiménez
- José Pidal
- Salvador Quiroz
- Gloria Rodríguez
- Humberto Rodríguez
- Gustavo Rojo
- Andrés Soler
