= Fee Malten =

German actress (1911–2005)

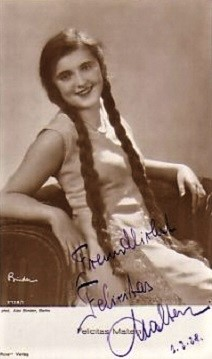
- Malten in 1928
- Born: 2 December 1911; Berlin, German Empire
- Died: 31 December 2005 (aged 94); Los Angeles, California, U.S.
- Other name: Felicitas Mansch
- Occupation: Actress

Fee Malten (1911–2005) was a German film actress, who later emigrated to the United States. Born in Berlin as Felicitas Mansch, Malten appeared as a leading lady in both silent and sound films of the late Weimar era. Due to her Jewish background, she was compelled to go into exile following the Nazi takeover in 1933. She eventually settled in the United States where she continued to act, generally in much smaller parts than she had received in Germany.

== Selected filmography ==
- At the Edge of the World (1927)
- The Woman in the Cupboard (1927)
- The Mysterious Mirror (1928)
- Whirl of Youth (1928)
- Diary of a Coquette (1929)
- A Tango for You (1930)
- Express 13 (1931)
- The Soaring Maiden (1931)
- Foreign Agent (1942)
- Hitler – Dead or Alive (1942)
- The Seventh Cross (1944)
- Young Bess (1953)

== Bibliography ==
- Goble, Alan. The Complete Index to Literary Sources in Film. Walter de Gruyter, 1999.
- Prawer, S.S. Between Two Worlds: The Jewish Presence in German and Austrian Film, 1910–1933. Berghahn Books, 2005.
