= I Was a Prisoner on Devil's Island =

1941 film by Lew Landers

- Theatrical release poster
- Directed by: Lew Landers
- Screenplay by: Karl Brown
- Story by: Otto Eis; Egon Eis (as Edgar Van Eyss)
- Produced by: Wallace MacDonald
- Starring: Sally Eilers; Donald Woods; Eduardo Ciannelli; Victor Kilian; Charles Halton; Dick Curtis
- Cinematography: John Stumar
- Edited by: Richard Fantl
- Production company: Columbia Pictures
- Distributed by: Columbia Pictures
- Release date: August 4, 1941
- Running time: 71 minutes
- Country: United States
- Language: English

I Was a Prisoner on Devil's Island is a 1941 American crime film directed by Lew Landers and written by Karl Brown. The film stars Sally Eilers, Donald Woods, Eduardo Ciannelli, Victor Kilian, Charles Halton and Dick Curtis. The film was released on August 4, 1941, by Columbia Pictures.

== Plot ==
Dr. Martel is the new physician at the notorious Devil's Island prison. He's in a loveless arranged marriage with Claire. Joel, sentenced to three years on Devil's Island for manslaughter, is in love with Claire. Joel is befriended by prison guard Guissart after the guard learns they both served in the French Foreign Legion. Joel's foot is almost amputated after he purposefully injures it in an attempt to get closer to Claire.

The corrupt prison Commandant and Dr. Martel steal a shipment of critical "jungle fever" vaccine and sell it on the black market, only to have the disease strike the prison and sicken Claire. Joel escapes Devil's Island and sails to the mainland to get the vaccine back. Guissart sends a telegram to the Governor on the mainland, requesting Joel's pardon for saving everyone. The Governor agrees to visit the prison, and the Commandant realizes he must kill Guissart or have all his crimes exposed. When Joel, Claire, and Guissart try to flee, the prison guards begin shooting. Dr. Martel and the Commandant, realizing Guissart is free, also try to leave the prison, only to be gunned down. The Governor grants Joel a pardon, and he, Claire, and Guissart leave Devil's Island.

== Cast ==
- Sally Eilers as Claire Martel
- Donald Woods as Joel Grant / Joseph Elmer
- Eduardo Ciannelli as Dr. Victor Martel
- Victor Kilian as Guissart
- Charles Halton as Commandant
- Dick Curtis as Jules
- John Tyrrell as Gerault
- Eddie Laughton as Brisson
- Edmund Cobb as Quarry Guard
- Robert Warwick as Governor
