= Charlotte Susa =

German actress (1898–1976)

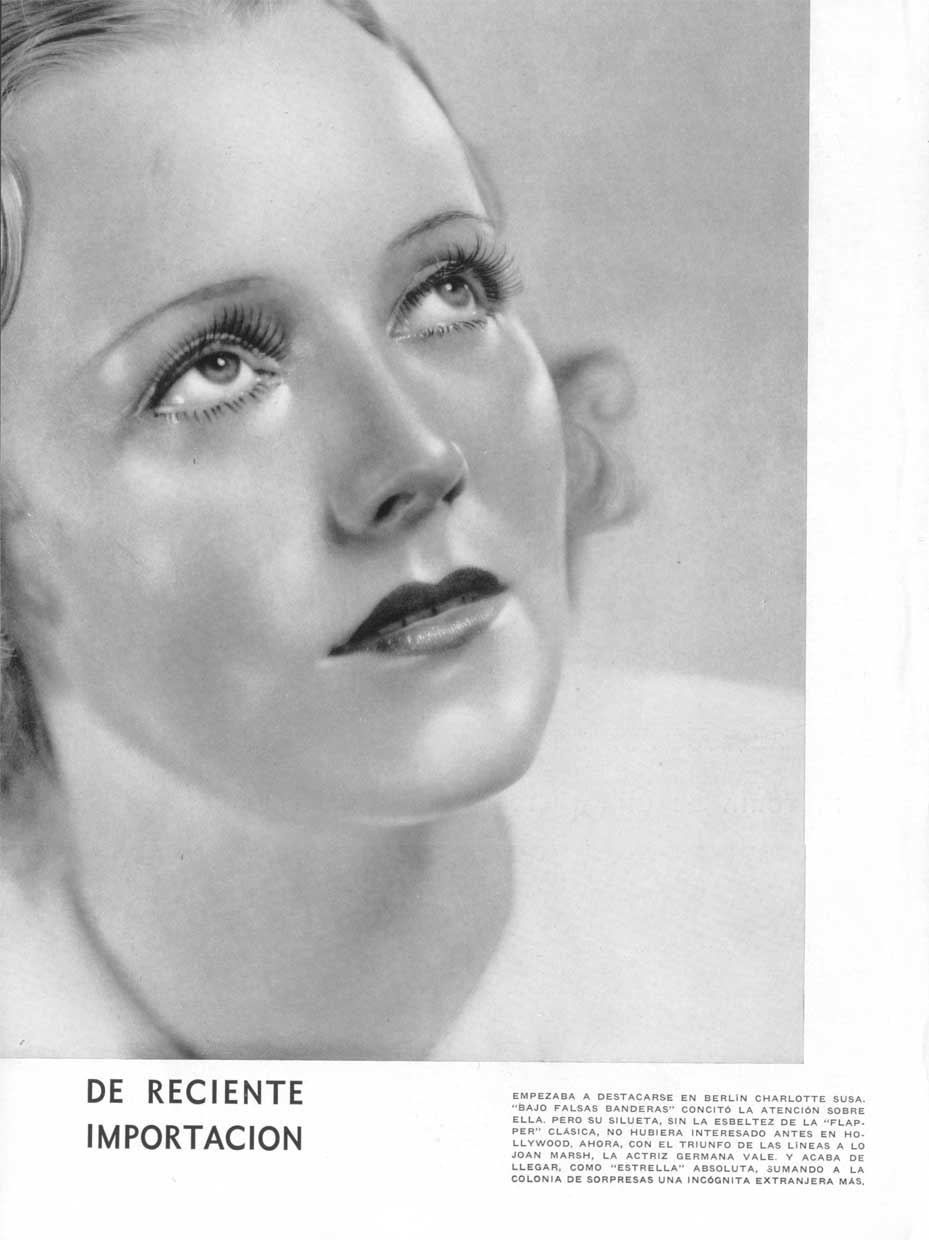
- Born: Charlotta Wegmüller; 1 March 1898; Gut Gaußen, Crottingen, East Prussia, Imperial Germany
- Died: 28 July 1976 (aged 78); Basel, Switzerland
- Occupation: Actress
- Years active: 1926–1941

Charlotte Susa (1 March 1898 – 28 July 1976) was a German actress.

== Biography ==
Susa was born Charlotta Wegmüller in Gut Gaußen (now part of Kretingalė), East Prussia and first appeared on a stage in 1915 at Tilsit. She chose her mother's maiden name "Susa" as her stage name and began a successful career as a singer and actress at different German opera and operetta stages, e.g. at Brandenburg, Essen, Düsseldorf, Hamburg and Cologne and later at the Admiralspalast in Berlin.

Susa gave her debut as a film actress in the German silent movie Der Prinz und die Tänzerin in 1926 and became popular for her roles as a femme fatale. In 1932 she signed a contract with MGM and moved to the United States to start an international career.

Elizabeth Yeaman wrote in her newspaper column on 15 August 1932:

"Lilian Harvey, Henry Garat, Anna Sten, and now Charlotte Susa, comprise a quartet of important foreign talent that soon will be seen in Hollywood pictures. (...) Miss Susa has arrived in New York and soon will reach these shores with an MGM contract. She was born in Lithuania of German parents and has won great fame in Germany. She first went on the stage as a singer, then as a dramatic actress, and three years ago she took up screen work. Who knows, she may be the actress who will take Garbo's place, provided Garbo never returns."

However, Susa did not succeed in Hollywood, returned to Germany soon and canceled the MGM contract in 1934. Her last role in a movie was a minor one in the 1941 comedy Der Gasmann alongside Heinz Rühmann and Anny Ondra. After that she returned to theater stages.

Susa was married to Paul Cablin, Fritz Malkowsky and after 1939 to Andrews Engelmann. She died at Basel in Switzerland at the age of 78.

== Filmography ==
- The Prince and the Dancer (1926)
- Herbstmanöver (1926)
- Love's Joys and Woes (1926)
- That Was Heidelberg on Summer Nights (1927)
- Der Sieg der Jugend (1927)
- Poor Little Colombine (1927)
- Frühere Verhältnisse (1927)
- Two Under the Stars (1927)
- Almenrausch and Edelweiss (1928)
- The Duty to Remain Silent (1928)
- The Love Commandment (1928)
- Sin and Morality (1929)
- Prisoner Number Seven (1929)
- Erotikon (1929)
- Father and Son (1929)
- The Tiger Murder Case (1930)
- Retreat on the Rhine (1930)
- The Great Longing (1930)
- The Copper (1930)
- Two People (1930)
- The Yellow House of Rio (1931)
- Walzerparadies (1931)
- Express 13 (1931)
- Marriage with Limited Liability (1931)
- Ausflug ins Leben (1931)
- The Paw (1931)
- Ehe m. b. H. (1931)
- Under False Flag (1932)
- Adventure on the Southern Express (1934)
- The Legacy of Pretoria (1934)
- She and the Three (1935)
- Everything for a Woman (1935)
- Königstiger (1935)
- Hangmen, Women and Soldiers (1935)
- Das große Abenteuer (1937)
- Water for Canitoga (1939)
- A Woman Like You (1939)
- The Gasman (1941)
