= Whirl of Youth =

1928 film

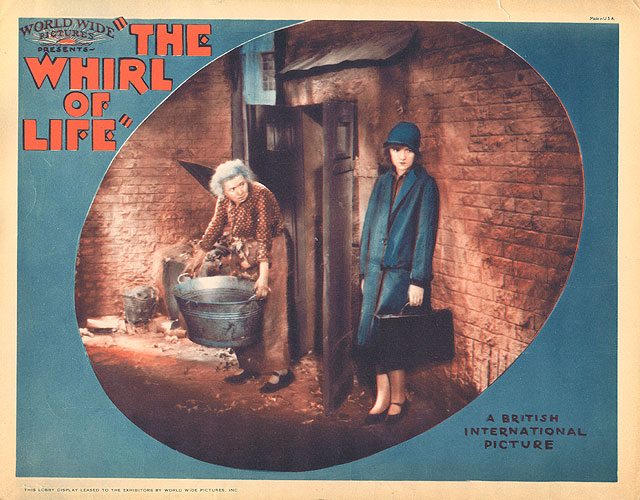
- Directed by: Richard Eichberg
- Written by: Clara Ratzka (novel); Helen Gosewish; Adolf Lantz; Ladislaus Vajda
- Produced by: Richard Eichberg
- Starring: Fee Malten; Heinrich George; Fred Louis Lerch
- Cinematography: Heinrich Gärtner
- Production companies: British International Pictures; Richard Eichberg-Film
- Distributed by: Süd-Film (Germany)
- Release date: 5 November 1928
- Countries: Germany; United Kingdom
- Languages: Silent; German intertitles

Whirl of Youth (German: Rutschbahn) is a 1928 British-German silent drama film directed by Richard Eichberg and starring Fee Malten, Heinrich George and Fred Louis Lerch.

The film's art direction was by Robert Herlth and Werner Schlichting.

== Cast ==
- Fee Malten as Heli, Tochter aus erster Ehe
- Heinrich George as Jig Hartford
- Fred Louis Lerch as Boris Berischeff
- Harry Hardt as Sten, der Gutsherr
- Erna Morena as Blida, seine Frau
- Arnold Hasenclever as Olaf, ihr Sohn aus 1. Ehe
- S.Z. Sakall as Sam, ein Artist
- Jutta Jol as Sonja, Helis Freundin
- Grete Reinwald as Nadja Berischeff, Boris Schwester
- Sig Arno
- Mona Maris

== Bibliography ==
- Hans-Michael Bock and Tim Bergfelder. The Concise Cinegraph: An Encyclopedia of German Cinema. Berghahn Books.
