= El Pasajero Diez Mil =

1946 film by Miguel Morayta

El Pasajero Diez Mil is a 1946 Mexican drama film directed by Miguel Morayta, who also co-wrote the script along with Eduardo Ugarte, and starring Rafael Baledón, Lilia Michel, and José Goula. This film marked the film debut of the Aguirre sisters (Elsa Aguirre and Alma Rosa Aguirre).
