= Antonie Jaeckel =

German actress

Antonie Jaeckel (5 September 1876 – 26 December 1960) was a German actress.

== Selected filmography ==
- Madeleine (1919)
- Fridericus Rex (1922)
- The Unknown Tomorrow (1923)
- Cock of the Roost (1925)
- If Only It Weren't Love (1925)
- Love's Joys and Woes (1926)
- That Was Heidelberg on Summer Nights (1927)
- Queen Louise (1927–28)
- Lord of the Night (1927)
- Potsdam (1927)
- Regine (1927)
- The Harbour Baron (1928)
- Give Me Life (1928)
- Strauss Is Playing Today (1928)
- Painted Youth (1929)
- Fräulein Else (1929)
- We Stick Together Through Thick and Thin (1929)
- Helene Willfüer, Student of Chemistry (1930)
- Delicatessen (1930)
- The Squeaker (1931)
- Three from the Unemployment Office (1932)
- The Mad Bomberg (1932)
- Little Dorrit (1934)
- Love Conquers All (1934)
- The Sporck Battalion (1934)
- Mazurka (1935)
- Make Me Happy (1935)
- The King's Prisoner (1935)
- She and the Three (1935)
- The Night With the Emperor (1936)
- Martha (1936)
- Der Mustergatte (1937)
- The Divine Jetta (1937)
- Love Can Lie (1937)
- Dangerous Game (1937)
- The Blue Fox (1938)
- Congo Express (1939)
- Bachelor's Paradise (1939)
- The Way to Freedom (1941)
- His Son (1942)
- Wedding in Barenhof (1942)
- No Place for Love (1947)
- Martina (1949)
- Don't Dream, Annette (1949)
- It Happened Only Once (1958)

== Bibliography ==
- Kulik, Karol. Alexander Korda: The Man Who Could Work Miracles. Virgin Books, 1990.
