= Sin and Morality =

1929 film

- Directed by: Erich Kober
- Written by: Erich Kober
- Starring: Charlotte Susa
- Cinematography: Otto Tober
- Music by: Heinz Rodenbusch
- Production company: Loew-Film
- Release date: April 1929
- Running time: 95 minutes
- Country: Germany
- Languages: Silent; German intertitles

Sin and Morality (German: Sünde und Moral) is a 1929 German silent film directed by Erich Kober and starring Charlotte Susa.

The film's sets were designed by August Rinaldi.

== Cast ==
In alphabetical order

- Carl Auen
- Gerhard Dammann
- Franz Diener
- Hilde Jennings
- Paul Samson-Körner
- Charlotte Susa
- Leopold von Ledebur

== Bibliography ==
- Alfred Krautz. International directory of cinematographers, set- and costume designers in film, Volume 4. Saur, 1984.
