= The Paw =

1931 film

- Directed by: Hans Steinhoff
- Written by: Rudolph Cartier; Egon Eis; Otto Eis
- Produced by: Carl Heinz Jarosy
- Starring: Charlotte Susa; Hans Rehmann; Fritz Rasp
- Cinematography: Carlo Montuori
- Edited by: Tonka Taldy
- Music by: Felice Montagnini
- Production companies: Orplid-Film; Società Italiana Cines
- Distributed by: Messtro-Film
- Release date: 10 November 1931
- Running time: 80 minutes
- Country: Germany
- Language: German

The Paw (German: Die Pranke) is a 1931 German thriller film directed by Hans Steinhoff and starring Charlotte Susa, Hans Rehmann, and Fritz Rasp. It was made as a co-production with the Italian Cines Studios. The film's sets were designed by the art director Daniele Crespi. A separate Italian version The Man with the Claw was also made.

== Synopsis ==
A notorious criminal and serial killer commits a series of murders using a strangely-shaped hand, leading the police to nickname him "The Paw". When he murders the engineer of a brand new racing car, one of the drivers takes the investigation into his own hands.

== Cast ==
- Charlotte Susa as Renate
- Hans Rehmann as Peter Krüger, Rennfahrer
- Fritz Rasp as Dr. Ing. Rappis
- Eugen Klöpfer as Ingenieur Lorenzi
- Berthe Ostyn as Frau Gina Rappis
- Oskar Sima as Polizeikommissar Bernard
- Peter Voß as Propagandachef Gastal
- John Mylong as Rennfahrer Lopez
- Erich Kestin as Monteur Köppe
- Carl Goetz as General-Direktor Alberti
- Flockina von Platen as Telephonistin
- Vicky Werckmeister as Stenotypistin

== Bibliography ==
- Bock, Hans-Michael; Bergfelder, Tim, eds. (2009). The Concise Cinegraph: Encyclopaedia of German Cinema. New York: Berghahn Books. ISBN 978-1-57181-655-9.
