= The Squeaker (1963 film) =

1963 film

- Film poster for Der Zinker
- Directed by: Alfred Vohrer
- Written by: Harald G. Petersson; based on a novel by Edgar Wallace
- Produced by: Horst Wendlandt; Jacques Willemetz
- Starring: Heinz Drache
- Cinematography: Karl Löb
- Edited by: Hermann Haller
- Music by: Peter Thomas
- Production companies: Rialto Film; Les Films Jaques Willemetz
- Distributed by: Constantin Film
- Release date: 26 April 1963
- Running time: 89 minutes
- Countries: West Germany; France
- Language: German

The Squeaker (German: Der Zinker) is a 1963 West German-French crime film directed by Alfred Vohrer and starring Heinz Drache. It was part of a very successful series of German films based on the writings of Edgar Wallace and adapted from the 1927 novel of the same name.

== Plot ==
Both Scotland Yard and the criminal community of London are trying to discover the identity of "the Squealer". This mysterious fence forces criminals to sell him their wares for a pittance. When some object, he "squeals" to the police. Those who oppose him are ruthlessly killed, preferably by means of the poison of the Black Mamba. Inspector Elford of Scotland Yard investigates and he has plenty of suspects. The trail leads to the strange Mr. Sutton, owner of a zoological store that also carries predators and poisonous snakes. During his investigation, Elford meets Mrs. Mulford, an older lady who tries to help ex-convicts, and Beryl, her niece, who writes crime stories and works as a court reporter. Inspector Elford discovers a similarity between the typeset of a machine also used by Sutton and letters written by the Squealer. To make Sutton confess, he is tricked by Mrs. Mulford in cooperation with the police into drinking what he believes to be poisoned tea.

== Cast ==
- Heinz Drache as Inspector Bill Elford
- Barbara Rütting as Beryl
- Günter Pfitzmann as Frankie Sutton
- Jan Hendriks as Mr. Leslie
- Inge Langen as Millie Trent
- Agnes Windeck as Mrs. Mulford
- Wolfgang Wahl as Sergeant Lomm
- Siegfried Wischnewski as The Lord
- Siegfried Schürenberg as Sir Geoffrey Fielding
- Albert Bessler as Butler
- Heinz Spitzner as Dr. Green
- Erik von Loewis as Jeweller
- Stanislav Ledinek as The Champ
- Winfried Groth as Jimmy
- Eddi Arent as Josua 'Jos' Harras
- Klaus Kinski as Krishna

== Production ==
The Squeaker was the 12th of a very successful series of German films made in the late 1950s and 1960s by producer Horst Wendlandt for Rialto Film. This particular installment was co-produced by French company 'Les Films Jaques Willemetz'. The script was adapted by Harald G. Petersson from the 1927 novel The Squeaker or The Sign Of the Leopard (The Squealer in the US). Earlier film versions had been made in 1930 (United Kingdom) and directed by Edgar Wallace himself, 1931 (Germany) and 1937 (again United Kingdom). In 1961, an initial treatment had been written by Egon Eis who had earlier also worked on the script for the 1931 film made in Germany. However, he did not want to copy his own work and refused to do the final script for the new film. Petersson, who so far had only reworked scripts for Rialto, was now tasked with writing an entire script for the first time. His script was much more terse than the novel and it found the approval of producer Wendlandt.

Wendlandt had to compete with films that were increasingly in colour. To boost the black and white film's attraction, it was shot in 'Ultra-Scope' a widescreen method. Alfred Vohrer directed the film. To boost production values, some scenes were shot on location in a wintry London. Additional exteriors were shot in West Berlin. The Spandau Studios were used for interior cinematography—making this the first of a total of 15 films from the series that used Artur Brauner's studios. Filming took place between 22 January and 28 February 1963.

This was the first film of the series to feature the signature beginning with a series of gun shots ringing out followed by a (coloured) bloodstain spreading across the screen as an invisible voice intones "Hello, this is Edgar Wallace!".

The FSK gave the film a rating of 16 and up and found it not appropriate for screenings on public holidays. It was released on 26 April 1963.

== See also ==
- The Squeaker (1930)
- The Squeaker (1931)
- The Squeaker (1937)
