= Margot Walter =

German actress (1903–1994)

Margot Walter, also known as Margot Landa (4 October 1903 in Potsdam, Germany – April 1994 in Camden Town, London, England), was a German actress.

== Life and career ==
Born in Potsdam near Berlin Walter became a regular member of the cast at the Hamburg Stadttheater in 1923. After a season at the Thalia Theater in Hamburg she moved to Berlin in 1925 after being contracted by the Deutsches Künstlertheater Berlin (German Artist Theatre Berlin), one of the several Berlin theatres run by successful Jewish theatrical producer Heinz Saltenburg. Her usual characters were the ingenue and the soubrette.

The following year (1926) her film career started when she was discovered by Reinhold Schünzel. Margot Walter played mainly happy-go-lucky teenage girls in comedies, romantic comedies and farces which were constantly on an insignificant artistic level. Those were topics popular with the audience during the period of radical change from silent to sound movies. Margot Walter contracted leading and main supporting roles.

Married to Jewish silent movie star Max Landa, 30 years her elder, her career came to a sudden end in January 1933 when the Nazi Party took over the government in Germany. The couple went into exile where her husband committed suicide the same year. As Margot Landa the young widow settled down in England, where she had worked already in 1928. Her last film appearance was in the British production Night Alone in 1938. Warwick Ward, the producer of Night Alone, knew her from Berlin where he had worked as an actor.

In spring 1994 Margot Landa died in Camden Town.

A different Margot Walter (born 1924) worked exclusively as stage actress, e.g. in Ingolstadt}, Germany in the 1950s.

== Filmography ==
- 1926: We'll Meet Again in the Heimat
- 1927: Babette Bomberling
- 1927: Always Be True and Faithful
- 1928: Endangered Girls
- 1928: Honeymoon
- 1928: Ringing the Changes
- 1929: Möblierte Zimmer
- 1929: Do You Know That Little House on Lake Michigan?
- 1929: Ship of Girls
- 1930: The Copper
- 1930: Bockfierfest
- 1930: A Thousand Words of German
- 1931: The True Jacob
- 1931: The Secret of the Red Cat
- 1931: Shooting Festival in Schilda
- 1931: Schön ist die Manöverzeit
- 1931: The Office Manager
- 1931: A Night at the Grand Hotel
- 1931: Zu Befehl, Herr Unteroffizier
- 1932: The Dancer of Sanssouci
- 1932: Spies at the Savoy Hotel
- 1932: Thea Roland
- 1933: Two Good Comrades
- 1938: Night Alone

== Bibliography ==
- Kay Weniger: 'Es wird im Leben dir mehr genommen als gegeben …'. Lexikon der aus Deutschland und Österreich emigrierten Filmschaffenden 1933 bis 1945. Eine Gesamtübersicht. p. 526, ACABUS Verlag, Hamburg 2011, ISBN 978-3-86282-049-8
