= The King's Prisoner =

1935 film directed by Carl Boese

- German: Der Gefangene des Königs
- Directed by: Carl Boese
- Written by: George Hurdalek
- Produced by: Otto Ernst Lubitz
- Starring: Michael Bohnen; Paul Kemp; Susi Lanner
- Cinematography: Franz Koch
- Edited by: Gottlieb Madl
- Music by: Wolfgang Zeller
- Production company: Bavaria Film
- Distributed by: Bavaria Film
- Release date: 13 August 1935
- Running time: 107 minutes
- Country: Germany
- Language: German

The King's Prisoner (German: Der Gefangene des Königs) is a 1935 German historical comedy film directed by Carl Boese and starring Michael Bohnen, Paul Kemp, and Susi Lanner. It is based around the development of Meissen porcelain during the eighteenth century, particularly the role of the alchemist Johann Friedrich Böttger. It was shot at the Bavaria Studios in Munich. The film's sets were designed by the art director Max Seefelder.

== Cast ==
- Michael Bohnen as König August
- Paul Kemp as Fritz Böttger
- Josef Eichheim as Zorn, Apotheker
- Albert Florath as Von Archenholtz
- Susi Lanner as Sophie von Archenholtz
- Adele Sandrock as Tante Sophie
- Hans Schlenck as Lieutenant von Paul
- Hilde Hildebrand as Fräulein von Mallwitz
- Ernst Dumcke as Fürst von Fürstenberg
- Hubert von Meyerinck as Von Beichlingen
- Oscar Marion as Lieutenant Menzel
- Hans Junkermann as Kraut, finance secretary
- Max Gülstorff as Schöller, finance secretary
- Antonie Jaeckel as Frau Kraut
- Gertrud Wolle as Frau Schöller
- Fritz Odemar as Jomelli
- Will Dohm as Knüppel
- O. E. Hasse as Von Zilchow
- Walter Holten as Count Dona
- Beppo Brem as Spitzer
- Willy Rösner as Kumpan
- Erich Ponto as Friseur
- Kurt Holm as Richter
- Max Weydner as Laskaris
- Richard Ulrich as Lakai
- Axel von Ambesser as dance master
- Gerhard Dammann as Saxon sergeant
- Lydia Schulenburg as court lady

== See also ==
- Augustus the Strong (1936), another film with Michael Bohnen as King Augustus
- The Blue Swords (1949), East German film about Johann Friedrich Böttger
