= Little Dorrit (1934 film) =

1934 film

- German: Klein Dorrit
- Directed by: Karel Lamač
- Written by: Curt J. Braun
- Based on: Little Dorrit by Charles Dickens
- Produced by: Artur Hohenberg; Robert Leistenschneider; Carl Lamac; Anny Ondra
- Starring: Gustav Waldau; Anny Ondra; Hilde Hildebrand
- Cinematography: Otto Heller; Ludwig Zahn
- Edited by: Ella Ensink
- Music by: Leo Leux
- Production companies: Ondra-Lamac-Film; Bavaria Film
- Distributed by: Bavaria Film
- Release date: 21 August 1934
- Country: Germany
- Language: German

Little Dorrit (German: Klein Dorrit) is a 1934 German drama film directed by Karel Lamač and starring Gustav Waldau, Anny Ondra, and Hilde Hildebrand. It is an adaptation of Charles Dickens' 1857 Victorian era novel Little Dorrit, and made a sharp contrast to the light comedies and musicals that Ondra usually appeared in. The film's sets were designed by the art directors Wilhelm Depenau and Erich Zander.

== Cast ==
- Gustav Waldau as William Dorrit
- Anny Ondra as Amy, his daughter
- Hilde Hildebrand as Lily, his daughter
- Kurt Meisel as Pit, his son
- Mathias Wieman as Arthur Clennam
- Antonie Jaeckel as Frau Clennam, his mother
- Otto Stoeckel as Merdle, her friend
- Fritz Rasp as Flintwinch
- Josef Eichheim as John Chivery
- Claire Glib
- O. E. Hasse
- Emil Höfer
- Jola Jobst
- Karl Schopp
- Max Weydner

== Bibliography ==
- Farina, William. Screening Charles Dickens: A Survey of Film and Television Adaptations. McFarland, 2022.
