= The Dead Eyes of London =

1961 film

- Theatrical release poster
- Directed by: Alfred Vohrer
- Written by: Edgar Wallace (novel); Egon Eis; Wolfgang Lukschy
- Produced by: Horst Wendlandt
- Starring: Joachim Fuchsberger; Klaus Kinski
- Cinematography: Karl Löb
- Edited by: Ira Oberberg
- Music by: Heinz Funk
- Production company: Rialto Film
- Distributed by: Prisma Film
- Release date: 28 March 1961
- Running time: 98 minutes
- Country: West Germany
- Language: German

The Dead Eyes of London (German: Die toten Augen von London and also known as Dark Eyes of London) is a 1961 West German black and white crime film directed by Alfred Vohrer and starring Joachim Fuchsberger, Karin Baal and Dieter Borsche.

== Plot ==
A series of murders of wealthy men leads investigators to a group of blind men with a mysterious leader.

== Cast ==
- Joachim Fuchsberger as Inspector Larry Holt
- Karin Baal as Eleanor "Nora" Ward (née Finlay)
- Dieter Borsche as David Judd / Mr. Lennox / Reverend Paul Dearborn
- Wolfgang Lukschy as Stephan Judd
- Eddi Arent as Sergeant / Inspector S. "Sunny" Harvey
- Anneli Sauli as Fanny Weldon (credited as Ann Savo)
- Bobby Todd as Lew Norris
- Franz Schafheitlin as Sir John
- Ady Berber as Jacob "The Blind Jack" Farrell (credited as Adi Berber)
- Harry Wüstenhagen as "Flimmer-Fred" (German version) / "Flicker-Fred" (English version)
- Rudolf Fenner as Matthew "Matt" Blake
- Hans Paetsch as Gordon Stuart
- Ida Ehre as Ella Ward
- Fritz Schröder-Jahn as Chief Inspector
- Klaus Kinski as Edgar Strauss

== Production ==
The film is based on the 1924 novel The Dark Eyes of London by Edgar Wallace, which had been previously adapted into the 1939 British film The Dark Eyes of London, a.k.a. The Human Monster, introducing a number of horror elements which had not been in the original book. The British film had been released in Germany and proved to be popular. The German film is closer to being a remake of the earlier British film, rather than a close adaptation of Wallace's novel.

The Dead Eyes of London was the first Edgar Wallace film to be directed by Alfred Vohrer, who directed 13 more films in the genre.

== Reception ==
The FSK gave the film a rating of "16 and up" and found it not appropriate for screenings on public holidays. The film premiered on 28 March 1961 at the "Walhalla" cinema in Wiesbaden. Author and film critic Leonard Maltin awarded the film two out of four stars, calling the film "[an] Acceptable thriller".
