= Karl Kimmich =

German banker

Karl Kimmich (September 14 1880 – September 10 1945) was a German banker. From 1933 to 1942, he was member of the executive board of Deutsche Bank and from 1942 to 1945 chairman of the same firm.

== Early life ==
He was the son of the painter, art teacher and author Karl Kimmich senior and his wife Christine, née Autenrieth and had a younger brother, Max W. Kimmich, who was thirteen years his junior. The latter later married the youngest sister of Joseph Goebbels.

== Education ==
After his Abitur, Kimmich became an apprentice at a private bank in Ulm before studying political economics, in which he promoted in 1906. After his promotion, he worked for the Schaffhausenscher Bankverein, a then Berlin bank. This lasted until 1915, when he went to the Cologne head office of this bank where he became over the years one of the best adepts of the Rhine-Ruhr area. In 1919, he was made assistant member and two years later regular member of the supervisory board, but had to give up this position in 1929, when the Bankverein was merged with the Deutsche Bank.

== Deutsche Bank ==
However, he got a new job at the syndicate transactions part of Deutsche Bank and made his fortune. Due to his knowledge of the Rhine-Ruhr economy, he was charged with the restructuring of, among others, the deeply indebted Cologne chocolate fabric of Stollwerck and the Bochum coal mine Lothringen, later transformed into the Mining company Lothringen. In May 1933, he became a member of the executive board of Deutsche Bank in Berlin and stayed in this position until 1942. In 1940, he also became CEO of the bank, but had to resign this post two years later for health reasons. After that, he was made chairman and stayed in this position until his death. He also was member of the supervisory boards of numerous heavy industry companies (such as Deutsche Erdöl-Aktiengesellschaft or Deutsche Reichsbahn) and chairman of the loan committee of the Reichsbank.

== Behaviour during Nazi era ==
During the Nazi era, Karl Kimmich was heavily involved in the "Aryanization" of Jewish firms carried out by Deutsche Bank. On July 25, 1938, he mentioned in a file note that 260 out of 700 Jewish firms listed by the bank's headquarters had been Arianized. In the same paper, he complained that it often took two months for all officials to approve the expropriation of a Jewish company. By November 1938, shortly before Kristallnacht, he could report to official ranks that his company had arranged so far 330 "arianisations" that were mostly concluded. He also had close personal ties to high Nazi officials, as his younger brother Max Wilhelm was brother-in-law to Nazi propaganda minister Joseph Goebbels. However, he was never sentenced for his actions during this time: originally, the Americans had planned to bring to trial all members of the executive board of Deutsche Bank, but later dismissed this plan because they thought nothing would come out of it. Karl Kimmich died on September 10, 1945 – shortly before his 65th birthday – in Berlin. The reasons of his death – illness or suicide – are quite uncertain.
