= Eduardo Ugarte =

Spanish, writer, film director and screenwriter

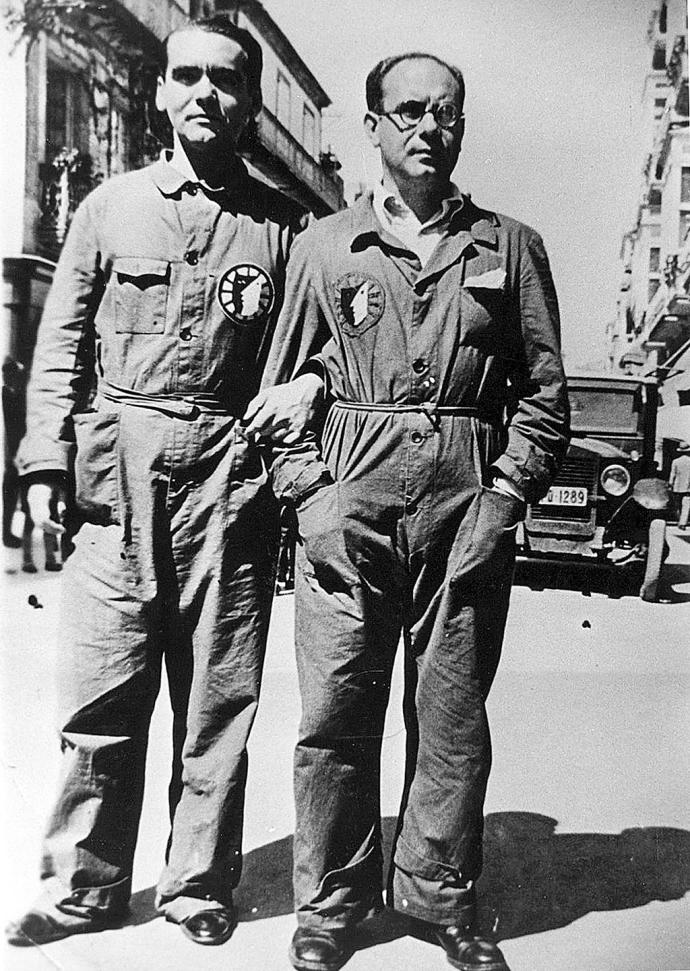
- Eduardo Ugarte and Federico García Lorca wearing the La Barraca company uniform, 1932
- Born: Eduardo María de la Presentación y de las Mercedes Mauricio Ugarte y Pagés; 22 October 1900; Hondarribia, Spain
- Died: 30 December 1955 (aged 55); Mexico City, Mexico
- Occupations: Screenwriter, writer, film director

Eduardo Ugarte y Pagés (22 October 1900 – 30 December 1955) was a Spanish writer, film director and screenwriter.

== Biography ==
Eduardo Ugarte was the son of the minister Francisco Javier Ugarte Pagés and his cousin Josefina Pagés y Bordiu.

Ugarte studied law and philosophy and literature in Madrid and Salamanca. He became a prominent member of the Socialist Students Union. In 1919, after the Russian Revolution, he traveled to Russia in order to volunteer for the Red Army, but was detained by the German police and sent back to Spain. Following this, he became a founding member of the Spanish Communist Party, the predecessor to the Communist Party of Spain.

Ugarte was close to the writers of the Generation of '27 and began his literary career by composing several plays in collaboration with José López Rubio. In 1929 he traveled to Hollywood and worked as a screenwriter for Metro-Goldwyn-Meyer.

He returned to Spain less than a year later and founded, together with Federico García Lorca, the Spanish University Theatre La Barraca. From 1934 to 1936 he was director of the literary department of the production company Filmófono where he collaborated with Luis Buñuel. In 1933 he became one of the founders of the Association of Friends of the Soviet Union.

After the beginning of the Spanish Civil War Ugarte became a founding member of the Alliance of Antifascist Intellectuals. He was then appointed cultural attaché at the Spanish embassy in Paris where he conducted pro-Republican propaganda and prepared the evaluation of Republican fighters. Following the war, Ugarte went into exile in Mexico where he eventually became a citizen. He continued his cinematic work in Mexico as screenwriter of sixteen films and director of six films.

Eduardo Ugarte died from a cardiovascular disease at the age of 53 in Mexico City.

== Filmography ==
=== As director ===
- Bésame mucho (1945)
- Por culpa de una mujer (1947)
- Yo quiero ser tonta (1950)
- El Puerto de los siete vicios (1950)
- Doña Clarines (1951)
- Prisionera del recuerdo (1952)

=== As screenwriter ===
- The Trial of Mary Dugan by Marcel De Sano and Gregorio Martínez Sierra (1931)
- La Mujer X by Carlos F. Borcosque (1931)
- Su última noche by Carlos F. Borcosque et Chester M. Franklin (1931)
- Don Quintín el amargao by Luis Marquina (1935)
- ¿Quién me quiere a mí? José Luis Sáenz de Heredia (1936)
- Sentinelle, alerte ! (¡Centinela, alerta!) by Jean Grémillon et Luis Buñuel (1937)
- One Night, One Day (1939)
- Amor chinaco by Raphael J. Sevilla (1941)
- La casa del rencor by Gilberto Martínez Solares (1941)
- Las Cinco noches de Adán by Gilberto Martínez Solares (1942)
- I Danced with Don Porfirio by Gilberto Martínez Solares (1942)
- Resurrection by Gilberto Martínez Solares (1943)
- Internado para señoritas by Gilberto Martínez Solares (1943)
- El Globo de Cantoya by Gilberto Martínez Solares (1943)
- Así son ellas by Gilberto Martínez Solares (1944)
- The Lieutenant Nun by Emilio Gómez Muriel (1944)
- Bésame mucho (1945)
- El Pasajero Diez Mil by Miguel Morayta (1946)
- Tender Pumpkins by Gilberto Martínez Solares (1949)
- Yo quiero ser tonta (1949)
- Doña Clarines (1951)
- Prisionera del recuerdo (1952)
- The Criminal Life of Archibaldo de la Cruz by Luis Buñuel (1955)
- Barefoot Sultan de Gilberto Martínez Solares (1956)
