= The Daffodil Mystery =

1920 novel by Edgar Wallace

- Author: Edgar Wallace
- Language: English
- Genre: Thriller
- Publisher: Ward Lock
- Publication date: 1920
- Publication place: United Kingdom
- Media type: Print

The Daffodil Mystery is a 1920 thriller novel by the British writer Edgar Wallace. It features the detective Jack Tarling and his Chinese assistant Ling Chu.

== Adaptation ==
It was adapted into a West German film, The Devil's Daffodil, in 1961 as part of a long-running series of Wallace adaptations made by Rialto Film.

== Bibliography ==
- Clark, Neil. Stranger than Fiction: The Life of Edgar Wallace, the Man Who Created King Kong. Stroud, UK: The History Press, 2015.
- Goble, Alan. The Complete Index to Literary Sources in Film. Walter de Gruyter, 1999.
