= The Terrible People (film) =

1960 film

- Film logo
- German: Die Bande des Schreckens
- Directed by: Harald Reinl
- Written by: J. Joachim Bartsch; Wolfgang Schnitzler
- Based on: The Terrible People by Edgar Wallace
- Produced by: Preben Philipsen
- Starring: Joachim Fuchsberger; Karin Dor; Fritz Rasp
- Cinematography: Albert Benitz
- Edited by: Margot Jahn
- Music by: Heinz Funk
- Production company: Rialto Film
- Distributed by: Constantin Film
- Release date: 25 August 1960
- Running time: 92 minutes
- Country: West Germany
- Language: German

The Terrible People (German: Die Bande des Schreckens, lit. 'The Band of Terror') is a 1960 West German crime film directed by Harald Reinl and starring Joachim Fuchsberger, Karin Dor and Fritz Rasp. It is based on Edgar Wallace's 1926 novel of the same name.

It was shot at the Bendestorf Studios near Hamburg with location shooting at Tremsbüttel Castle in Schleswig-Holstein. The film's sets were designed by the art director Erik Aaes.

== Cast ==
- Joachim Fuchsberger as chief inspector Long
- Karin Dor as Nora Sanders
- Fritz Rasp as Lord Godley Long
- Dieter Eppler as Mr. Crayley
- Ulrich Beiger as Mr. Henry
- Karin Kernke as Alice Cravel
- Ernst Fritz Fürbringer as Sir Archibald
- Eddi Arent as Antony Edwards
- Karl-Georg Saebisch as banker Monkford / teacher Monkford
- Alf Marholm as Richard Cravel
- Elisabeth Flickenschildt as Mrs. Revelstoke
- Klaas Akkermann as Sergeant
- Otto Collin as Clay Shelton
- Josef Dahmen as hangman
- Peter Frank as man
- Siegfried Frese as man
- Günter Hauer as Sergeant Rouch
- Werner Hedman as angler
- Karl-Heinz Kreienbaum
- Horst Krüger as man
- Marga Maasberg as woman
- Ludwig Meybert as man
- Marga Meybert as woman
- Reinhold Nietschmann as man
- Karl-Heinz Peters as Tonio
- Alfons Seyler as man
- Mita von Ahlefeldt
- Wilhelm Walter as man

== Production ==
The film is based on Edgar Wallace's 1926 novel of the same name. Cinematography took place in London between June and 23 July 1960.

== Release ==
The FSK gave the film a rating of 16 and up and found it not appropriate for screenings on public holidays.

== See also ==
- The Terrible People (1928, film serial)
