= The Squeaker (1930 film) =

1930 film

- Directed by: Edgar Wallace
- Written by: Edgar Wallace
- Based on: The Squeaker by Edgar Wallace
- Produced by: S.W. Smith
- Starring: Percy Marmont; Anne Grey; Gordon Harker
- Cinematography: Claude L. McDonnell; Horace Wheddon
- Edited by: Stephen Harrison
- Production company: British Lion Film Corporation
- Distributed by: British Lion Film Corporation
- Release date: June 1930
- Running time: 90 minutes
- Country: United Kingdom
- Language: English

The Squeaker is a 1930 British mystery crime film directed by Edgar Wallace and starring Percy Marmont, Anne Grey and Gordon Harker. It was adapted by Wallace from his 1927 novel The Squeaker. Shot at Beaconsfield Studios, it was one of several films based on Wallace's novels made by the British Lion Film company.

== Plot ==
Frank Sutton employs ex-convict Captain Leslie in his office. Sutton is engaged to Beryl Steadman, but Beryl and Leslie fall in love. Seeking to put an end to this relationship, Sutton's secretary, Millie Trent, frames Leslie for a jewellery robbery. Sutton and Beryl's wedding goes ahead, and Leslie is subsequently released on bail. Beryl's foster father discovers that Sutton is actually a notorious fence known as "The Squeaker" – as well as a bigamist – and shoots him dead. In a final twist, Leslie is revealed to be an undercover Scotland Yard detective who had been tracking The Squeaker all along.

== Cast ==
- Percy Marmont as Captain Leslie
- Anne Grey as Beryl Stedman
- Gordon Harker as Bill Annerley
- Trilby Clark as Millie Trent
- Alfred Drayton as Lew Friedman
- Eric Maturin as Frank Sutton
- Nigel Bruce as Collie
- W. Cronin Wilson as Inspector

== See also ==
- The Squeaker (1931)
- The Squeaker (1937)
- The Squeaker (1963)

== Reception ==
Kine Weekly wrote: "Edgar Wallace has, in effect, produced a series of stage scenes, and neglected to give them much atmosphere or continuity. The climaxes are weak, and too much reliance has been placed on the dialogue, to the exclusion of pictorial development. Nevertheless, the interest is fairly well mantained, and the comedy moments are a joy."

The Daily Film Renter wrote: "Edgar Wallace's first personally directed picture is a curious blend of effectiveness and its opposite. Its characterisation is good, the plot is quite a strong, if somewhat impossible, one, and the light relief is good, but as a whole the film misses scoring the big success which it seems to approach on one or two occasions. The cause is largely to be found in a somewhat rambling scenario, and in Wallace's inability, as a director, to achieve an effective screen climax. The film is, in fact, better in detail than as a whole."
