= The Terrible People (serial) =

1928 film

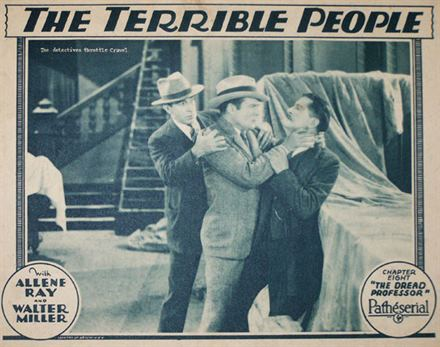
- Lobby card
- Directed by: Spencer Gordon Bennet
- Written by: George Arthur Gray; Edgar Wallace
- Starring: Allene Ray; Walter Miller
- Distributed by: Pathé Exchange
- Release date: August 5, 1928
- Running time: 10 episodes
- Country: United States
- Language: Silent with English intertitles

The Terrible People is a 1928 American adventure silent film serial directed by Spencer Gordon Bennet, based on the 1926 novel of the same name by Edgar Wallace. It was released as a 10-chapter serial. The film is now considered to be lost.

Most of the books of Edgar Wallace have been adapted into films many times over the years in both England in the 1930s, and in Germany in the 1960s in a series known as the crimis. The Terrible People was remade as a German crimi film under the same title in 1960.

== Plot ==
An heiress is threatened by the gang of a criminal who seems to have returned from the dead. Clay Shelton was executed for his crimes, but it seems he has returned to life to exact revenge on the people responsible for his death.

== Cast ==
- Allene Ray as Nora Sanders
- Walter Miller as Arnold Long
- Larry Steers as Jack Crayley
- Al Craven as Joshua Monkford (as Allen Craven)
- Alyce McCormick as Alice Cravel
- Wilfrid North as Godley Long
- Frederick Vroom as Clayton Shelton (as Fred Vroom)
- Thomas Holding as Sonny Cravel
- Gilbert Clayton as Krill
- Billy Bletcher as Proody (as William Bletcher)

== See also ==
- List of film serials
- List of film serials by studio
- Films based on works by Edgar Wallace
