= The Squeaker (1937 film) =

1937 film

- U.S. theatrical poster
- Directed by: William K. Howard
- Screenplay by: Ted Berkman (as Edward O. Berkman); Bryan Edgar Wallace (scenario) (as Bryan Wallace)
- Based on: novel and play by Edgar Wallace
- Produced by: Alexander Korda
- Starring: Edmund Lowe; Sebastian Shaw; Ann Todd
- Cinematography: Georges Périnal
- Edited by: Russell Lloyd
- Music by: Miklós Rózsa
- Production company: London Film Productions
- Distributed by: United Artists
- Release dates: 6 November 1937 (UK); 11 November 1937 (New York)
- Running time: 77 minutes
- Country: United Kingdom
- Language: English
- Box office: £42,858 (UK distributor)

The Squeaker (U.S. title: Murder on Diamond Row) is a 1937 British crime film directed by William K. Howard and starring Edmund Lowe, Sebastian Shaw and Ann Todd. It was written by Ted Berkman (as Edward O. Berkman) and Bryan Edgar (as Bryan Wallace) based on the 1927 novel The Squeaker and the 1928 play of the same title by Edgar Wallace.

Lowe reprised his stage performance in the role of Inspector Barrabal. The term "squeaker" is underworld slang for an informer, analogous to the American term "squealer".

== Plot ==
London's thieves are at the mercy of the Squeaker, a fence who is involved with every major jewellery robbery in the city. If the thieves refuse to split the loot with him, the Squeaker informs the police of their involvement. A disgraced former detective seizes the opportunity to clear his name if he can capture the Squeaker.

== Cast ==
- Edmund Lowe as Inspector Barrabal
- Sebastian Shaw as Frank Sutton
- Ann Todd as Carol Stedman
- Tamara Desni as Tamara
- Robert Newton as Larry Graeme
- Allan Jeayes as Inspector Elford
- Alastair Sim as Joshua Collie
- Stewart Rome as Police Superintendent Marshall
- Mabel Terry-Lewis as Mrs. Stedman
- Gordon McLeod as Mr. Field
- Alf Goddard as Sergeant Hawkins
- Danny Green as Safecracker
- Michael Rennie as Medical Examiner
- Neva Carr Glyn

== Reception ==
=== Box-office ===
Kinematograph Weekly reported the film as a "runner up" at the British box office in February 1938.

=== Critical ===
The Monthly Film Bulletin wrote: "Edmund Lowe as Inspector Barrabal gives a good performance and Alistair Sim as the Scotch reporter is outstanding. The setting of the country house is particularly lovely and the exciting situations are well handled by the director."

For the Sunday Mirror, critic Walter Webster wrote: "The plot is highly ingenious. It is developed with fine expense and the background of Scotland Yard with Stewart Rome in charge is utterly convincing. This is good stuff with a glorious comedy performance by Alastair Sim as a Scotch reporter in London, Sebastian Shaw and Robert Newton in two splendid dramatic characterisations and Ann Todd at long last getting an opportunity to play an intelligent part in a film and doing so with great distinction. But it is Edmund Lowe as the detective who takes charge of the drama and gives it zest. He plays with polish and punch."

Frank S. Nugent of The New York Times wrote: "Rarely have we seen a murder out with less suspense or mystification. ... The lighting is poor, Tamara Desni's song and dance sequences are third rate and the cast – with the exception of Mr. Lowe and Alastair Sim as a 'journalist' – is hardly worth mentioning. I say, Mr. Korda, this won't do, you know."

== See also ==
- The Squeaker (1930)
- The Squeaker (1931)
- The Squeaker (1963)
