= The Squeaker (1931 film) =

1931 film

- Directed by: Martin Frič; Karel Lamač
- Written by: Edgar Wallace (novel); Rudolph Cartier; Egon Eis; Otto Eis
- Produced by: Karel Lamač
- Starring: Lissy Arna; Karl Ludwig Diehl; Fritz Rasp
- Cinematography: Otto Heller
- Edited by: Alwin Elling; Heinz Ritter
- Production company: Ondra-Lamac-Film
- Distributed by: Süd-Film
- Release date: 30 July 1931
- Running time: 70 minutes
- Country: Germany
- Language: German

The Squeaker (German: Der Zinker) is a 1931 German crime film directed by Martin Frič and Karel Lamač and starring Lissy Arna, Karl Ludwig Diehl and Fritz Rasp. It is an adaptation of the 1927 Edgar Wallace novel The Squeaker. This adaptation introduced the mix of suspense and comedy that would come to define numerous German Wallace adaptations over the following decades. Lamač followed it up with another Wallace film The Ringer in 1932. The film's sets were designed by the art director Heinz Fenchel. It was shot at the Halensee Studios in Berlin and on location in Prague.

== Cast ==
- Lissy Arna as Lillie / Millie Trent
- Karl Ludwig Diehl as Captain Leslie
- Fritz Rasp as Frank Sutton
- Peggy Norman as Beryl Stedman, seine Nichte
- Paul Hörbiger as Josuah Harras, Reporter
- S. Z. Sakall as Bill "Billy" Anerley
- Robert Thoeren as Charles "Charly" Tillmann
- John Mylong as Harry "Juwelen Harry" Webber
- Ernest Reicher as Inspektor Elford, Scotland Yard
- Karl Forest as Sergeant Miller
- Fritz Greiner as Falschspieler
- Marianne Kupfer as Zena
- Antonie Jaeckel as Garderobiere im 'Leopard-Club'

== See also ==
- The Squeaker (1930)
- The Squeaker (1937)
- The Squeaker (1963)

== Bibliography ==
- Bergfelder, Tim. International Adventures: German Popular Cinema and European Co-Productions in the 1960s. Berghahn Books, 2005.
