= The Terrible People (novel) =

1926 novel

- First edition (UK)
- Author: Edgar Wallace
- Language: English
- Genre: Crime
- Publisher: Hodder & Stoughton (UK); Doubleday, Page (US)
- Publication date: 1926
- Publication place: United Kingdom
- Media type: Print

The Terrible People is a 1926 crime novel by the British writer Edgar Wallace.

== Adaptations ==
The novel was turned into The Terrible People an American film serial in 1928 and The Terrible People (1960), part of the long-running German series of Edgar Wallace adaptations of the 1960s.
