= Tropical Nights (1931 film) =

1931 film

- Directed by: Leo Mittler
- Written by: Joseph Conrad (novel)_Rudolph Cartier; Egon Eis; Grover Jones; William Slavens McNutt
- Produced by: Paul Reno
- Starring: Dita Parlo; Robert Thoeren; Fritz Greiner_Else Heller
- Cinematography: René Guissart
- Production company: Paramount Pictures
- Distributed by: Paramount Pictures
- Release date: 1931
- Running time: 65 minutes
- Country: United States
- Language: German

Tropical Nights (German: Tropennächte) is a 1931 American German language drama film directed by Leo Mittler and starring Dita Parlo, Robert Thoeren and Fritz Greiner. The film was one of five multi-language versions of the American film Dangerous Paradise (1930) made by Paramount at the Joinville Studios in Paris. These were made in the years following the introduction of sound film, before the practice of dubbing became widespread. The film, like the original American production, is based on Joseph Conrad's 1915 novel Victory.

== Cast ==
- Dita Parlo as Alma
- Robert Thoeren as Heyst
- Fritz Greiner as Schomberg
- Else Heller as Frau Schomberg
- Fritz Rasp as Jones
- Manfred Fürst as Ricardo
- Werner Hollmann as Zangiacomo

== Bibliography ==
- Moore, Gene M. Conrad on Film. Cambridge University Press, 2006.
