= The Dark Eyes of London (film) =

1939 British film by Walter Summers

- Theatrical release poster under its U.S. title The Human Monster
- Directed by: Walter Summers
- Written by: John Argyle; Patrick Kirwan; Walter Summers; Jan Van Lusil
- Based on: The Dark Eyes of London by Edgar Wallace
- Produced by: John Argyle
- Starring: Béla Lugosi; Hugh Williams; Greta Gynt; Edmon Ryan; Wilfred Walter; Alexander Field
- Cinematography: Bryan Langley
- Edited by: Ted Richards
- Music by: Guy Jones
- Production company: Argyle Film
- Distributed by: ABPC
- Release date: October 1939 (United Kingdom)
- Running time: 76 minutes
- Country: United Kingdom
- Language: English

The Dark Eyes of London (U.S. title The Human Monster) is a 1939 British horror film directed by Walter Summers, and starring Béla Lugosi, Hugh Williams, and Greta Gynt. It was written by John Argyle, Patrick Kirwan, Summers and Jan Van Lusil based on the 1924 novel of the same name by Edgar Wallace, and produced by Argyle. The film is about a scientist named Dr Orloff who commits a series of murders for insurance money, while periodically disguising himself as the blind manager of a charity to further his scheme.

== Plot ==
In London, Dr Orloff runs a life insurance agency where he loans money on his customers' policies. Scotland Yard begins finding bodies in the Thames River, all of them insured by Orloff with the Dearborn Home for the Blind as their sole beneficiary. This charity Home, which Orloff sponsors and serves as its medical advisor, is located in a dilapidated former warehouse abutting the Thames.

One of the dead men has a daughter named Diane for whom Orloff obtains employment at the Home as seeing-person secretary to the soft-spoken, also blind, Dearborn. Suspicions begin to arise surrounding Dearborn and Orloff in relation to the dead bodies, and it becomes clear to the audience that Dearborn is really Orloff, disguising both his face and voice.

After Diane finds one of her father's cufflinks at the Home, Orloff sends his henchman Jake, a deformed blind resident of the Home, to kill Diane who has found out too much about them but she eludes him with the help of the young police inspector on the case. Confronted by Diane, Dearborn removes his disguise to show himself as Orloff.

He carries her to the warehouse's loft, where he has been killing his victims by drowning them in a vat of water. He puts her in a strait-jacket and calls for Jake to finish the job of killing her in like manner. Jake refuses as he has found out that Orloff has sadistically deafened his one friend, also blind, before killing him. Jake turns on Orloff, Orloff shoots Jake, but Jake perseveres, captures Orloff and throws him out of a loading door, to sink into the river mud-flats below. The inspector breaks in and frees Diane as Jake dies of his wounds.

== Cast ==
- Bela Lugosi as Dr Feodor Orloff
- Hugh Williams as Detective Inspector Larry Holt
- Greta Gynt as Diana Stuart
- Edmon Ryan as Lieutenant Patrick O'Reilly
- Wilfred Walter as Jake
- Arthur E Owen as Dumb Lou
- Alexander Field as Fred Grogan
- May Hallatt as Police Constable Griggs
- Bryan Herbert as Police Sgt Walsh
- Charles Penrose as Morrison, undercover detective
- Gerald Pring as Henry Stuart
- Philip Stewart as Scotland Yard Detective
- George Street as Commissioner, Scotland Yard
- Julie Suedo as Orloff's secretary
- O. B. Clarence as Professor John Dearborn (voice, uncredited)

== Production ==
Bela Lugosi sailed to England to star in the film's dual role of Dr Orloff and Professor Dearborn (the original novel has two Orloff characters but the film's script combined them into one). When portraying the role of Dearborn, Lugosi's voice is dubbed by O. B. Clarence. It was made at Welwyn Studios with sets designed by the art director Duncan Sutherland. The day after Lugosi arrived on set, shooting began and lasted 11 days.

The final scene involving Orloff's demise was difficult to film. A seven-foot-deep tank was filled with a concoction to resemble river mud. A member of the crew was lowered into the mess with a chain that allowed him to escape easily if he were sucked under. It is intercut with a shot of Lugosi's head sinking, but Lugosi did not submerge. Weights had to be tied to Lugosi's ankles to keep his body sunk.

== Release ==
The film was released in the United Kingdom in October 1939. In the United Kingdom, The Dark Eyes of London was the first British film to receive the 'H' rating and the last British horror film to receive the rating. The "H" rating was introduced in 1933 by the British Board of Film Censors (BBFC) for films labelled "Horrific" for "any films likely to frighten or horrify children under the age of 16 years"

The Dark Eyes of London was released in the United States under the title The Human Monster by Monogram Pictures in March 1940

== Reception ==
The Monthly Film Bulletin wrote: "An excellent melodrama which cleverly does not depend only on gruesome make-up but succeeds by appealing to the nerves and imagination. Not for the timid or over-sensitive, but well constructed and well acted. Bela Lugosi adds much to the eerie atmosphere, and Hugh Williams as a keen young inspector is comfortably reassuring."

Variety wrote: "Too much is made of the scenes where the blind are shown at work, and the anti-climax is too heavily prolonged after the story apparently is concluded. Dialog is not too weighty and attempts at witty repartee are painful. Despite these flaws and a tendency to elaborate too much early in the vehicle, director Walter Summers has done surprisingly well to hold suspense. Lugosi acts with more relish than in recent times on the screen."

== See also ==
- Bela Lugosi filmography
- British films of 1939
- List of horror films of the 1930s

== Notes ==
- Chibnall, Steve; Petley, Julian (2002). British horror cinema. Routledge. ISBN 0415230047.
- Gifford, Denis (2001) [1973]. The British Film Catalogue. Vol. 1 (3 ed.). Routledge. ISBN 978-1-57958-171-8.
- Johnson, Tom (2006). Censored Screams: The British Ban on Hollywood Horror in the Thirties. McFarland. ISBN 0786427310.
- Lennig, Arthur (2003). The Immortal Count: The Life and Films of Bela Lugosi. University Press of Kentucky. ISBN 0813122732.
- Rhodes, Gary Don; F. Richard Sheffield (2006). Lugosi: His Life in Films, on Stage, and in the Hearts of Horror Lovers. McFarland. ISBN 0786427655.
