= Max W. Kimmich =

German film director (1893–1980)

Max Wilhelm Kimmich (4 November 1893 – 16 January 1980), also known as M. W. Kimmich, was a German film director and screenwriter during the first half of the 20th century. He was the brother-in-law of Nazi Propaganda Minister Joseph Goebbels.

== Early life (1893–1933) ==
He was born in Ulm in West Germany to the painter, art teacher and author Karl Kimmich and his wife Christine, née Autenrieth. He had an older brother, also named Karl Kimmich, thirteen years his senior. While his brother went into banking, Max Kimmich visited military academies in Karlsruhe and Berlin after passing his school leaving exams and later fought as a regular officer in World War I. After the war, he studied medicine for a few terms, but at the beginning of the 1920s he became attracted to theatre and film, especially American films. So he worked at the German Cinema Company, beginning as an assistant and dramatic adviser. After that he became associate producer and later, producer, with the Rochus Gliese film company. In 1924, he went to Hollywood, where he worked at Universal Studios as a screenwriter and, according to himself, as director. But as he could not really gain ground in the USA, in 1929, he went back to Germany. The following year, he composed the music to his first sound film Waves of Passion (Wellen der Leidenschaft). In the next few years, he edited screenplays for cloak-and-dagger films like Under False Flag (1931/1932), The Invisible Front (1932) or On Secret Service (1933) with various partners.

== During the Nazi era (1933–1945) ==
After the Nazis seized power in 1933, Kimmich's career began to boom. He wrote the screenplays for several adventure films - sometimes with a nationalistic touch like Hangmen, Women and Soldiers from 1935 - and worked for directors such as Harry Piel and Paul Wegener. In 1938, he produced his first film as director, a crime movie that was also broadcast as a radio drama in Breslau the following year. In February 1938, he married Maria Goebbels, the youngest sister of propaganda minister Joseph Goebbels. The latter seems to have been skeptical at first about this relationship, because he suspected that Kimmich was not really interested in his sister, but only in the excellent connections the marriage would grant him. (Since film was an important propaganda medium for the Nazis, this was quite possible). Kimmich was able to allay Goebbels´ doubts in a private conversation in summer 1937, and the marriage took place the following year. He specialized in anti-British propaganda films, e.g. My Life for Ireland (1940/1941), and Germanin (1942), the latter portraying scientists developing a medicine against sleeping sickness. While Nazi film magazines praised Germanin - shortly after release it was awarded both the "artistically valuable" and "valuable in terms of national policy" rating by the film censorship authority - today it is considered to be rather weak. Several of Kimmich's other films gained official recommendations in those years. His works The Fugitive of Chicago (1933/1934), I Sing Myself into Your Heart (1934), Hangmen, Women and Soldiers (1935), Fourth Man Missing (1938/1939), and The Fox of Glenarvon (1940) were recommended as "artistically valuable". He earned most recommendations, however, for My Life for Ireland. This 1940/1941 movie was tagged not only as "artistically and politically valuable", but additionally as "particularly suitable for adolescents" (jugendwert). His last film, Peanuts, which he started in 1944 with the production house Tobis, was not yet finished at the end of the war. It has been said that while working on this movie, Kimmich was in Vienna and witnessed the invasion of the Allies, but Goebbels biographer Curt Riess states that Kimmich was in Berlin and escaped from the nearly encircled town with his wife and mother-in-law on April 19, 1945.

== Until his death (1945–1980) ==
After the German surrender, Kimmich moved to the small village of Mörlbach about 24 km south of Munich with his family (he had become a father in early 1945). There they lived under a false name for nearly a year, but in June 1946 he revealed their real identities to the American occupying forces. While being questioned by the Americans several times, he, his wife and his mother-in-law all claimed they did not have contact with Joseph Goebbels and had never taken any money from him. Kimmich claimed that Joseph Goebbels - contrary to his own diary entries - seldom took care of his relatives. He further alleged that this behaviour of his brother-in-law had been decisive in his disregarding Goebbels' order to stay in Berlin and commit suicide. There is speculation that Kimmich might have been interned after that interview as there was a photo taken by an American journalist on June 25, 1946 - two weeks after the first interview - which shows only his daughter with her mother and grandmother. The description of the photo stated that the little girl was 18 months old.

The Allies banned his films My Life for Ireland, The Fox of Glenarvon (another anti-British propaganda film) and Germanin. However, in the early 1950s, the ban was lifted by the German film industry, which had gained independence once again. His movie Moscow-Shanghai was shown in West German cinemas in 1949, now called The Way to Shanghai. During the following years, he worked as an author, produced several scripts for radio and television broadcasts and - until the late 1950s - also worked for the Deutscher Filmring (Defir, a Munich film company). From the mid-1950s onwards, he and his wife earned money from the publication of Joseph Goebbels' diaries and other unpublished works by Francois Genoud (in his last will and testament, Goebbels had named his sister as his sole heir).

Max Kimmich died on 16 January 1980 at the age of 86 in Icking.

== Filmography ==
=== Silent film ===
- Brother (Drama/Fantasy, 1922, production manager)
- In the Name of the King (1924, production manager)
- Winterstürme (1924, production manager)
- Unter heißer Sonne (1924, producer)
- German Wine (1928, screenplay)
- On the Reeperbahn at Half Past Midnight (adventure film, 1928/1929, production manager)
- Do You Know That Little House on Lake Michigan? (1929, Co-director, screenplay)

=== Sound films ===
- Kurs auf die Ehe/Wellen der Leidenschaft (adventure film, 1930, music)
- Under False Flag (cloak-and-dagger movie, 1931/1932, screenplay)
- The Invisible Front (cloak-and-dagger movie, 1932, screenplay)
- Little Girl, Great Fortune (1933, screenplay)
- On Secret Service (cloak-and-dagger movie/romance/war film, 1933, Co-screenplay)
- The Fugitive from Chicago (adventure film, 1933/1934, Co-screenplay)
- Man nehme (1933/1934, director, screenplay)
- Artistes (adventure/drama/romantic movie, 1934/1935, screenplay)
- Ännchen von Tharau (romantic movie, 1935, screenplay)
- Hangmen, Women and Soldiers (propaganda film, 1935, Co-screenplay)
- Moscow-Shanghai (drama, 1936, assistant director, Co-screenplay)
- Row and Joy About Kunnemann (1936/1937, Co-screenplay)
- Doppelselbstmord (1937, director)
- Der Mann an der Wand (1937, director, screenplay.)
- Die Fledermaus (1937, assistant director)
- Es leuchten die Sterne (1937/1938, assistant director)
- The Fourth Is Not Coming (crime movie, 1938/1939, director, screenplay.)
- Der letzte Appell (1939, director, unfinished)
- Der singende Tor (musical drama, 1939, idea)
- The Fox of Glenarvon (propaganda film, 1940, director.)
- My Life for Ireland (drama/propaganda film, 1940/1941, director, Co-screenplay)
- Nacht ohne Abschied (1942/1943, model)
- Germanin (scientists´biography, 1942/1943, director, Co-screenplay, producer.)
- Kleinigkeiten (1944, unfinished)

== Sources ==
- Cinegraph: Encyclopedia for German-speaking film. Ed. by Hans Michael Bock. Edition Textkritik. 1984ff.
- Wer ist wer? The German "Who-is-who". Vol. 13, 1958.
- Weniger, Kay: The big people's encyclopedia for films. Vol. 4, 2004.
