= The Dark Eyes of London (novel) =

1924 novel by Edgar Wallace

- Author: Edgar Wallace
- Language: English
- Genre: Crime
- Publication date: 1924
- Publication place: United Kingdom
- Media type: Print

The Dark Eyes Of London is a crime novel by the British writer Edgar Wallace which was first published in 1924. An unbalanced doctor and his brother murder a series of wealthy men to benefit from their life insurance policies, using a charity for the blind as a front for their activities. The persistent Inspector Holt of Scotland Yard is soon on their trail. It was based on an earlier short story The Croakers which Wallace had written.

== Adaptations ==
The novel has twice been adapted into films. The first was a British version directed by Walter Summers, The Dark Eyes of London (1939), which turned Wallace's crime story into a more overt horror film. Due to its popularity there, this was the inspiration for a similar German remake, The Dead Eyes of London (1961), directed by Alfred Vohrer.
