= The Crimson Circle (novel) =

1922 novel by Edgar Wallace

- Cover of Hodder & Stoughton 'yellow jacket' paperback, 1933
- Author: Edgar Wallace
- Language: English
- Genre: Detective fiction
- Publisher: Hodder and Stoughton
- Publication date: 1922
- Publication place: United Kingdom
- Media type: Print
- Pages: 320 p.
- OCLC: 213436480

The Crimson Circle is a 1922 crime novel by the British writer Edgar Wallace. Scotland Yard tackle a secret league of blackmailers known as The Crimson Circle. The novel was first published in The People's Story Magazine, March 10, 1922. The first book edition in the UK was by Hodder & Stoughton, London, 1922; and the first US edition was by Doubleday, Doran & Co., New York, 1929.

== Plot ==
"When James Beardmore receives a letter demanding £100,000 he refuses to pay—even though it is his last warning. It is his son Jack who finds him dead. Can the amazing powers of Derrick Yale, combined with the methodical patience of Inspector Parr, discover the secret of the Crimson Circle? Who is its all-powerful head and who is the stranger who lies in wait? Twice in a lifetime a ruthless criminal faces the executioner."

== Adaptations ==
The novel has been adapted into films on four occasion.

- A 1922 silent film The Crimson Circle (1922 film)
- A 1929 UK-German co-production in both silent and sound versions The Crimson Circle (1929 film)
- A 1936 British film The Crimson Circle (1936 film)
- A 1960 West German film The Crimson Circle
