= The Crimson Circle (1922 film) =

1922 British film by George Ridgwell

- Directed by: George Ridgwell
- Written by: Patrick L. Mannock
- Based on: The Crimson Circle by Edgar Wallace
- Starring: Fred Groves; Robert English; Rex Davis
- Cinematography: Phil Ross
- Production company: Kinema Club
- Distributed by: Granger Distributors
- Release date: September 1922
- Running time: 50 minutes
- Country: United Kingdom
- Languages: Silent; English intertitles

The Crimson Circle is a 1922 British silent crime film directed by George Ridgwell and starring Clifton Boyne, Fred Groves and Robert English. The film was an adaptation of the 1922 novel The Crimson Circle by Edgar Wallace.

A German-British version of novel, The Crimson Circle (1929), was filmed in both a silent and Phonofilm sound-on-film version.

== Plot ==
Police battle against a gang of blackmailers known as The Crimson Circle.

== Selected cast ==
- Clifton Boyne as Derrick Yale
- Fred Groves as Inspector Parr
- Robert English as Felix Marl
- Lawford Davidson as Raphael Willings
- Rex Davis as Jack Beardmore
- Sidney Paxton as Harvey Froyant
- Harry J. Worth as Superintendent
- Eva Moore as Aunt Prudence
- Norma Whalley as Kitty Froyant
- Madge Stuart as Thalia Drummond
- Mary Odette
