= The Squeaker (novel) =

1927 novel by Edgar Wallace

- First edition
- Author: Edgar Wallace
- Language: English
- Genre: Crime
- Publisher: Hodder & Stoughton (UK); Doubleday Doran (US)
- Publication date: 1927
- Publication place: United Kingdom
- Media type: Print

The Squeaker is a 1927 crime novel by the British writer Edgar Wallace., published in the US as The Squealer in 1928. In the story, an ex-detective goes undercover to find out the identity of a notorious informer who betrays his criminal associates to the police for his own gain.

== Film adaptations ==
The novel has been adapted for the screen several times:

- The Squeaker (1930 film), a British film
- The Squeaker (1931 film), a German film
- The Squeaker (1937 film), a British film
- The Squeaker (1963 film), a West German film

== Bibliography ==
- Bergfelder, Tim. International Adventures: German Popular Cinema and European Co-Productions in the 1960s. Berghahn Books, 2005.
- Goble, Alan. The Complete Index to Literary Sources in Film. Walter de Gruyter, 1999.
