= The Crimson Circle (1929 film) =

1929 film by Frederic Zelnik

- Directed by: Frederic Zelnik
- Written by: Fanny Carlsen; Howard Caye
- Based on: novel The Crimson Circle by Edgar Wallace
- Starring: Lya Mara; Fred Louis Lerch; Stewart Rome
- Cinematography: Frederik Fuglsang; Leslie Rowson
- Music by: Edmund Meisel
- Production companies: British International Pictures; British Sound Film Productions; Efzet Film
- Distributed by: Deutsche Film Union (Germany)
- Release date: 25 March 1929 (Berlin)
- Countries: Great Britain; Germany
- Languages: Sound (Part-Talkie); English Intertitles

The Crimson Circle (German: Der rote Kreis) is a 1929 British-German sound part-talkie crime film directed by Frederic Zelnik and starring Lya Mara, Fred Louis Lerch, and Stewart Rome. In addition to sequences with audible dialogue or talking sequences, the film features a synchronized musical score and sound effects along with English intertitles. The sound was recorded via the De Forest Phonofilm sound-on-film process. The film is an adaptation of the 1922 Edgar Wallace novel The Crimson Circle in which Scotland Yard detectives battle a gang of blackmailers. A previous UK version was filmed in 1922.

The film, a co-production between British International Pictures and Efzet Film. In March 1929, this film and The Clue of the New Pin, filmed in the British Phototone sound-on-disc process, were previewed in London. As with most early sound films, a silent version was edited down from the sound version for release to theatres that had not yet converted to sound.

== Synopsis ==
Scotland Yard officers battle against a gang of blackmailers known as The Crimson Circle.

== Cast ==
- Lya Mara as Thalia Drummond
- Fred Louis Lerch as Jack Birdmore
- Stewart Rome as Derrick Yale
- Albert Steinrück as Froyant
- John Castle as Inspektor Parr
- Otto Wallburg as Marl
- Hans Albers as Diener von Marl
- Hans Marlow as Birdmore
- Otto Treßler as Ministerpräsident
- Ilka Grüning as Eine Vermieterin
- Annie Ann as Milly
- Bruno Ziener as Kriminalkommissar
- Hugo Döblin as Pfandleiher
- Ria Weber as Zofe

== See also ==
- List of early sound feature films (1926–1929)
