= Kara Ben Nemsi Effendi =

- Genre: adventure
- Created by: Günter Gräwert
- Starring: Karl Michael Vogler; Heinz Schubert; Jean-Pierre Zola; Lina Carstens
- Composer: Martin Böttcher
- Country of origin: Germany
- Original language: German
- No. of seasons: 2
- No. of episodes: 26

Production
- Executive producer: Max Gierke
- Camera setup: Horst Schier; Michael Thiele
- Running time: 30

Original release
- Network: ZDF
- Release: October 1, 1973 – April 7, 1975

Kara Ben Nemsi Effendi is a German television series broadcast from 1973 through 1975 in 26 parts and two seasons. It featured an adventurer probably inspired by British explorers Richard Francis Burton (1821–1890) and T. E. Lawrence. The scripts were faithful to Karl May's Orient novels, and the score is from Martin Böttcher who previously had composed the music for ten very successful Karl May films in cinema, and also for the two parts of Winnetous Rückkehr in 1998, also being aired by the German station ZDF.

== Protagonist ==
Kara Ben Nemsi (Karl Michael Vogler) has traveled the Wild West as Old Shatterhand and is now about to explore the Near East. His traditional German first name Karl is difficult for many non-Germans to pronounce, so his oriental sidekick Hadschi Halef Omar prefers to call him "Kara".

Kara Ben Nemsi, a German hero-adventurer of the 1880s, is actually a kind of superman (as was Doc Savage later), not only speaking dozens of foreign tongues fluently but also being able to knock out everybody with just one blow to the temple. He rides his famous black stallion Rih as well as Frank Hopkins could, and is such an excellent marksman he could work in Wild West shows.

Hadschi Halef Omar (played by Heinz Schubert, best known from the German version of the British television series Till Death Us Do Part, is the hero's scout and his teacher when it comes to oriental conventions. He always shows solidarity although the very self-confident Kara Ben Nemsi is always prone to take risks.

== Production ==
The 13 parts of the first season were filmed from August to September 1972 in the Carpathian Mountains and Bulgaria and from October to November 1972 in the deserts of Tunisia. The 13 parts of the second season were filmed from June to August 1974 in Spain around Almeria, mainly for financial reasons. The director engaged many popular guest stars, including Ferdy Mayne, Heinz Baumann, Dieter Hallervorden and Willy Semmelrogge.

== Other films ==
Kara Ben Nemsi not only was to be seen in this TV series, but also in the films:

- On the Brink of Paradise (1920) with Carl de Vogt
- Caravan of Death (1920) with Carl de Vogt
- The Devil Worshippers (1921) with Carl de Vogt
- Across the Desert (1936) with Fred Raupach
- Die Sklavenkarawane (1958) with Viktor Staal
- Der Löwe von Babylon (1959) with Helmuth Schneider
- The Shoot (1964) with Lex Barker
- Wild Kurdistan (1965) with Lex Barker
- Kingdom of the Silver Lion (1965) with Lex Barker

== DVD release ==
The complete series was released on DVD in 2006/2007. In the second DVD box a soundtrack CD with the music of Martin Böttcher is included.
