= Rih =

Rih or RIH may refer to:

- Rih (ріг), a Ukrainian word meaning "horn"
  - Rih (instrument) ("horn"), a Ukrainian instrument
  - Kryvyi Rih ("Curved Horn"), a city in Ukraine
  - Mykytyn Rih ("Mykytyn's Horn"), the original name of the city of Nikopol, Ukraine
- RIH, abbreviations:
  - RIH (bicycle), a Dutch bicycle manufacturer
  - The NYSE symbol for Robert Half International, a staffing and human resources services firm.
  - Rhode Island Hospital, located in Providence, Rhode Island.
- Rih, a word for "wind" in Arabic, sometimes used for the Jinn in Islam, as they are invisible like the wind (Mishkat al-Masabih 5860)
- Rih, a fictional black horse belonging to Kara Ben Nemsi in the books of Karl May, it means “fast as the wind” in Arabic
- A short name for Barbadian singer Rihanna
- Rih Dil, a lake in Chin State, Myanmar
