= Caravan of Death (1920 film) =

1920 film

- Directed by: Josef Stein
- Written by: Erwin Báron; Marie Luise Droop; Karl May
- Produced by: Marie Luise Droop
- Starring: Carl de Vogt; Meinhart Maur; Béla Lugosi
- Cinematography: Gustave Preiss; Otto Stein
- Distributed by: Filmhaus Bruckmann & Co.
- Release date: 16 November 1920
- Running time: 92 minutes
- Country: Weimar Republic
- Language: Silent

Caravan of Death (German: Die Todeskarawane) is a 1920 silent German film directed by Josef Stein and featuring Carl de Vogt as Kara Ben Nemsi. The film was an adaptation of the latter half of the Karl May novel From Baghdad to Stamboul, and is now considered to be lost.

It was a sequel to Stein's earlier 1920 film On the Brink of Paradise. Béla Lugosi played a supporting role as a sheik. Erwin Baron, who wrote the screenplay, also played Omram in the film.

== Plot ==
Kara Ben Nemsi and his companion Haji Halef Omar join a caravan of Mohammedans on a pilgrimage to bury their dead. When an outbreak of plague strikes, both men contract the disease. Weakened by illness, they must still defend the caravan from traps laid by Kurdish adversaries en route to the holy site.

== Cast ==
- Carl de Vogt as Kara Ben Nemsi
- Meinhart Maur as Hadschi Halef Omar / Saduk
- Erwin Baron as Omram
- Gustav Kirchberg as Hassan Ardschir Mirza
- Dora Gerson as Dschana Ardschir Mirza
- Cläre Lotto as Benda Ardschir Mirza
- Maximilian Werrak as Tschaschefsky
- Karl Kuszar Puffy as Kepek
- Erna Felsneck as Amina
- Anna von Palen as Marah Durimeh
- Beate Herwigh as Hafsa
- Béla Lugosi as a Sheik (uncredited)
- Arthur Kraußneck as Tschaschefsky
