= Heinz Schubert (actor) =

German actor

Heinz Schubert (12 November 1925 – 12 February 1999) was a German actor, drama teacher and photographer, best known for playing the role of Alfred Tetzlaff in the German television sitcom Ein Herz und eine Seele.

== Life ==
Schubert was born in Berlin, the son of a master tailor. He went to drama school after his release from captivity as a prisoner of war.

In 1951, Bertolt Brecht asked for him directly to join his Berliner Ensemble, where Schubert remained until the Berlin Wall was erected in 1961. From then on, Schubert worked in West Germany in theatre (in Munich, Hamburg, Stuttgart and Berlin) and taught drama; he was first a docent and in 1985 was awarded a professorship at the Hochschule für Musik und Theater Hamburg.

In 1958 Schubert also started to work in film, first for DEFA productions, playing the role of the Schweizerkas that he had been known for in the Berliner Ensemble in the film version of the Brecht drama. He also acted in fairy stories and the much-loved DEFA Das Stacheltier series. From 1961, in the West, he also acted in television productions.

In 1973 Schubert was given the part for which he is best remembered, and which he later did his best to escape from: the role of Ekel Alfred ("Nasty Alfred") in the satirical ARD television series Ein Herz und eine Seele, written by Wolfgang Menge. The series was based on the British series Till Death Us Do Part by Johnny Speight; the themes it brought up and the language it used put it in the headlines and drew a huge audience. Schubert played the German equivalent to Alf Garnett or Archie Bunker, a tyrannical bigot, and appeared the part, with a hairstyle and mannerisms comparable to those used by German dictator Adolf Hitler.

Schubert was capable of a wide range of roles, however, and proved this in his much-praised portrayal of Hadschi Halef Omar in the 26-part ZDF television series Kara Ben Nemsi Effendi (1973/1975), based on the books of Karl May, or his starring role in films such as Strongman Ferdinand and Hitler – Ein Film aus Deutschland, in which he played both Hitler and Heinrich Himmler. Schubert also acted alongside Michael Caine in the British spy film Funeral in Berlin.

As well as his film roles, Schubert acted in an increasing number of television series, playing the private detective Fetzer in Detektivbüro Roth and Dr. Fink in the ZDF film The Great Bellheim. In 1996 he once more played the main role in a Wolfgang Menge series, again based on a British sitcom, as Viktor Bölkhoff in Mit einem Bein im Grab (adapting One Foot in the Grave.)

As well as his acting career, Schubert also loved photography. He is especially well known for his many photographs of shop windows and mannequins; this work was on show at the documenta 6 in Kassel in 1977. In 1979 he published a book of these photographs, Theater im Schaufenster ("Theatre in the Shop Window").

Heinz Schubert received several awards, including the Goldene Kamera (1993) and the Adolf Grimme Award (1994). He died of pneumonia on 12 February 1999 in Hamburg, where he had acted for many years.

== Partial filmography ==
- Katzgraben (1957) - Günther, ein junger Bergmann
- My Wife Makes Music (1958) - Spießer
- Das Stacheltier – Der junge Engländer (1958)
- Geschichte vom armen Hassan (1958) - Wasserhändler
- Sie nannten ihn Amigo (1959) - Dicker Gestapo-Mann
- Das Feuerzeug (1959) - Der Geizige
- Mother Courage and Her Children (1961) - Schweizerkas
- Italienisches Capriccio (1961)
- On the Sunny Side (1962) - Felix Schnepf
- My Daughter and I (1963) - Detektiv
- Murke's Collected Silences (1964, TV Movie) - Schnabel
- Emil and the Detectives (1964) - Grundeis
- Funeral in Berlin (1966) - Aaron Levine
- Tattoo (1967) - Auctioneer
- Das Messer (1971, TV Mini-Series) - Police Inspector Bird
- Tatort (1971–1995, TV Series) - Kommissar a.D. Leo Felber / Hans Gebhardt / Dr. Gottschling
- Ein Herz und eine Seele (1973–1976, TV Series) - Alfred Tetzlaff
- Kara Ben Nemsi Effendi (1973–1975, TV Series) - Hadschi Halef Omar
- A Lost Life (1976)
- Strongman Ferdinand (1976) - Ferdinand Rieche
- Hitler: A Film from Germany (1977) - Zirkusdirektor / Heinrich Himmler / Himmler-Puppenspieler / Adolf Hitler
- Zwei himmlische Töchter (1978, TV Mini-Series) - Fluglotse
- Es begann bei Tiffany (1979, TV Movie) - Leo Timpe
- Obszön – Der Fall Peter Herzel (1981) - Dr. Dieter Flake
- High Society Limited (1982) - Kolbe
- Marmor, Stein und Eisen bricht (1982)
- Konrad oder das Kind aus der Konservenbüchse (1982) - Apotheker Egon
- Love Is Not an Argument (1984)
- Detektivbüro Roth (1986–1987, TV Series) - Egon Fetzer
- Europa, abends (1989) - Frisör
- Stein und Bein (1991, TV Movie) - Erwin Stein
- The Great Bellheim (1993, TV Mini-Series) - Dr. Erich Fink
- The Lucona Affair (1993) - Minister Kurt Bach
- Chacun pour toi (1993) - Botha
- Zwei alte Hasen (1994–1995, TV Series) - Wille Wuttke
- Mit einem Bein im Grab (1996–1998, TV Series) - Viktor Bölkoff
- Hundert Jahre Brecht (1998)
- Silberdisteln (1998, TV Movie) - Alfons Schambeck
- The Volcano (1999) - Jewish man (final film role)

== Sources ==
This article was partly translated from the German language version of October 16, 2006
