= Howling Wolf =

Howling Wolf may refer to:

- Howlin' Wolf (1910–1976), Chicago blues musician
- Howling Wolf (Cheyenne) (1849–1927), Native American artist and witness to the Sand Creek massacre of 1864
- The Howling Wolf, a 1919 German silent film
- Howling, a wolf communication characteristic
