= On the Brink of Paradise =

1920 film

- Directed by: Josef Stein
- Written by: Erwin Baron; Marie Luise Droop; Karl May (novel)
- Produced by: Marie Luise Droop; Fritz Knevels; Adolf Droop
- Starring: Carl de Vogt; Meinhart Maur
- Cinematography: Josif Rona
- Production company: Ustad-Film
- Distributed by: Filmhaus Bruckmann and Co.
- Release date: 7 October 1920
- Running time: 90 minutes
- Country: Germany
- Language: Silent

On the Brink of Paradise (German: Auf den Trümmern des Paradieses/ transl: On the Ruins of Paradise) is a 1920 German 90-minute film directed by Josef Stein and featuring Carl de Vogt in the title role of Kara Ben Nemsi. Béla Lugosi was thought to have appeared in a supporting uncredited role, but this is disputed. The film was an adaptation of part of the 1892 Karl May novel Von Bagdad nach Stambul and is now considered to be lost.

The film was followed by a sequel Caravan of Death (1920), which went on to adapt the latter part of the same Karl May novel (Bela Lugosi did co-star in the sequel, playing a shiek).

== Plot ==
Kara ben Nemsi and his servant Halef Omar come across a group of Persians headed to Baghdad, led by Prince Hassan Ardžir-Mírza. The Persians are attacked by their enemies, the Kurds. Prince Hassan discovers there is a traitor among his people. Kara ben Nemsi offers to help guard the caravan on its journey to Baghdad.

== Cast ==
- Carl de Vogt as Kara Ben Nemsi / Abdul Malik
- Meinhart Maur as Hadschi Halef Omar / Saduk
- Gustav Kirchberg as Prince Hassan Ardzir-Mirza / Hussein Mohammed
- Dora Gerson as Dzana Ardschir Mirza
- Cläre Lotto as Benda Ardschir Mirza
- Tronier Funder as Selim Aga
- Erwin Baron as Omram / Jesid Abu Sufian
- Beate Herwigh as Hafsa
- Fred Berger as Obeidullah
- Anna von Palen as Marah Durimeh
- Curt Bry as Piano
- Helga Hall
- Béla Lugosi? (his appearance in the film is unconfirmed/disputed)

== See also ==
- Karl May film adaptations
- Béla Lugosi filmography
