= Hitler: A Film from Germany =

1977 Franco-British-German experimental film

- Theatrical release poster
- Directed by: Hans-Jürgen Syberberg
- Written by: Hans-Jürgen Syberberg
- Produced by: Bernd Eichinger
- Starring: Heinz Schubert
- Narrated by: Hans-Jürgen Syberberg
- Cinematography: Dietrich Lohmann
- Edited by: Jutta Brandstaedter
- Production companies: BBC; WDR Köln; I.N.A. Paris; TMS Film GmbH; Solaris Film
- Distributed by: Omni Zoetrope (US)
- Release dates: 5 November 1977 (United Kingdom); 7 June 1978 (France); 8 July 1978 (West Germany)
- Running time: 412 minutes
- Countries: West Germany; France; United Kingdom
- Languages: German; English; French; Russian

Hitler: A Film from Germany (German: Hitler, ein Film aus Deutschland), called Our Hitler in the US, is a 1977 biographical film written, directed and narrated by Hans-Jürgen Syberberg, and produced by Bernd Eichinger. A co-production by West Germany, France and the United Kingdom, the film stars Heinz Schubert in a dual role, as Adolf Hitler and Heinrich Himmler. Along with Syberberg's characteristic and unusual motifs and style, it is notable for its 412-minute running time.

== Plot and setting ==
At the beginning and end of the film, Syberberg quotes from Heinrich Heine's poem Nachtgedanken, from the 1844 collection Zeitgedichte. The film is divided into four sections: "The Grail", "A German Dream", "The End of a Winter's Tale", and "We, Children of Hell".

At the beginning, Heinz Schubert appears as a circus director. He later portrays Adolf Hitler, who rises from Richard Wagner's grave as a demon, and Heinrich Himmler, who is shown receiving a massage. The film creates the impression of an artificial studio landscape. It refers to various symbols of German culture and history, including paintings by Philipp Otto Runge and Caspar David Friedrich, as well as images of winter landscapes, Greta Garbo, and the Reich Chancellery.

The film also uses historical visual and audio material from the Nazi era, including a recording of a radio conference call broadcast on Christmas during World War II. Syberberg frequently combines several elements at the same time, including sound effects, music, spoken dialogue, action in the foreground, and a film projection in the background. Recurring motifs include an audio recording of a Nazi memorial ceremony for "the fallen of the movement" and a snow globe.

== Structure ==
Hitler: A Film from Germany has no clear plot or chronology. Instead, each part explores one particular topic.

- Part 1: Der Gral - Von der Weltesche bis zur Goethe-Eiche von Buchenwald (The Grail - From the Cosmic Ash-Tree to the Goethe Oak of Buchenwald) deals with Hitler's cult of personality in Nazi propaganda.
- Part 2: Ein deutscher Traum ... bis ans Ende der Welt (A German Dream ... Until the End of the World) focuses on how Nazi propaganda was associated with pre-Nazi German cultural, spiritual, and national heritage.
- Part 3: Das Ende eines Wintermärchens und der Endsieg des Fortschritts (The End of a Winter's Tale and the Final Victory of Progress) tells about the Holocaust and the ideology behind it, particularly from Himmler's point of view.
- Part 4: Wir Kinder der Hölle erinnern uns an das Zeitalter des Grals (We Children of Hell Recall the Age of the Grail) consists mostly of André Heller reading out scenes from the script that were not shot, climaxing in Heller talking to a Hitler puppet on how he completely destroyed Germany spiritually, combined with a satire on former Nazis who after the war made profits from the Nazi era by running a Nazi tourism and entertainment industry for foreigners.

=== Recurring plot devices ===
One particular plot device, especially for mocking post-war fascination and cliches about Hitler and Nazism, is endless recitals from the non-fictional autobiographies of people in direct contact with Hitler on his lifestyle, such as by Hitler's personal valet Heinz Linge (played by Hellmut Lange) and his adjutant Otto Günsche (played by Peter Kern), talking to the camera as if the spectator were a young person who intends to learn about Hitler, while these seemingly endless passages end with original radio broadcasts on German war casualties and lost battles. This plot device thus mocks both Hitler's affiliation with his own personality and his increasingly delusional state that made him more and more unable to competently lead a war the longer it lasted, as well as it mocks post-war German fascination with every little detail about historical Nazism and its people, indicating that this post-war fascination might be nothing but subconscious admiration that will once more lead Germany to repeat the same downfall as apparent in the radio broadcasts.

Himmler's personality is sometimes explored in a similar way by reciting the memories of such people as Himmler's personal astrologist (played by Peter Moland), or his masseur Felix Kersten (played by Martin Sperr), though not as extensively as in Hitler's case and not ending in such dramatic radio broadcasts.

Especially unusual is the portrayal of Himmler's personality. While Hitler is always impersonated by Heinz Schubert, Himmler's role is split into several actors, including Schubert among others, each indicating a different aspect of Himmler's personality, such as "the esoterical ideologue" (played by Rainer von Artenfels), dressed as an SS member, "the military leader" (leading a war for Nazism and Germany, against the Jews and other degenerate "un-German" influences; played by Hellmut Lange as well), dressed as an ordinary Wehrmacht officer, or "Hitler's ideological adherent and loyal servant" (dressed in an SS uniform, also played by Peter Kern).

== Production ==
=== Narration and fictional characters ===
Some continuity is given to the film by Syberberg's narration and fictional characters. Syberberg's off-screen narration partly philosophizes on pre-war and post-war German fascination with Hitler and Nazism, while in the beginning he tells a mythologized tale about the shortcomings of the Weimar Republic and its downfall giving rise to the Third Reich. Later, the narration focuses on comparing Nazism to basically "inhumane" pornography, Stalinism and socialist East Germany. In order to draw parallels between Nazism and pornography, Syberberg also arranges quite graphic scenes, involving a realistic, life-sized reproduction of Joseph Goebbels's carbonized, dead body covered in his burned and melted flesh (as found and photographed by the Red Army), inflatable sex dolls, and dildos.

A mythologized portrayal of Democracy and Germany is personified by Syberberg's young daughter, Amelie Syberberg, holding a puppet and walking around in mystical sets to Syberberg's narration, also appearing later in the film. It is not clear which of the two—Syberberg's daughter or her puppet—is Democracy and which of them is Germany.

The film's first part 30-minute intro is separated into two 15-minute acts, the first being Syberberg's mythologized narration of the end of the Weimar Republic, the second half being Schubert impersonating a circus announcer within an actual circus set announcing "the great, magnificent" Hitler ("the German Napoleon") in ad-speech and show-biz jargon, while also outlining that the purpose of the film is not only being "the Big Hitler Show" but also a film on Germany and German mentality in general, about "the Hitler within us all" and "Auschwitz as an ideological battle of racial warfare."

A similar role as the circus announcer is later introduced when a freak show compère (also played by Rainer von Artenfels) enters the film within a prop set of a cabinet of curiosities, demonstrating various oddities and Nazi relics, such as the Spear of Destiny ("as owned by Thomas the Apostle, Saint Maurice, Constantine the Great, Charlemagne, Otto I, Henry IV, Frederick I Barbarossa, the Habsburg dynasty...and then Hitler!") and the philosopher's stone, both found by Himmler's SS, Himmler's Germanic Urpferd (purported evolutionary ancestor to the modern horse), and Hitler's semen in a phial. The compère then also introduces the various supporting characters, each introducing themselves in third person after he has announced them.

Among them is also Ellerkamp (played by Harry Baer), a fictional SS-member, later a post-war projectionist and film producer, and the Cosmologist (played by Peter Lühr). The Cosmologist is partly based on Hanns Hörbiger, creator of the Welteislehre, but he is portrayed as still being alive during Hitler's reign and after World War II, and looks more like Leonardo da Vinci or Socrates than Hörbiger.

=== Props, set design, and visual style ===
The film's surreal visual style was developed by Henri Langlois, using props and set designs from the Cinémathèque Française that had originally been used for a film called Der Film - Die Musik der Zukunft ("Film: Music of the future"). It has also been noted that the film's visual style and set design are strongly inspired by Richard Wagner's opera cycle Der Ring des Nibelungen, musical excerpts from which are frequently used in the film's soundtrack.

== Release ==
in 1977, Hitler: a Film from Germany was screened at the London Film Festival. It was awarded the Sutherland Trophy.

Our Hitler screened in the Un Certain Regard section at the 1978 Cannes Film Festival. It was also screened in the summer of 1978 at the Palace of Fine Arts in San Francisco, California.

On the review aggregator website Rotten Tomatoes, 80% of 5 critics' reviews are positive.

It was re-released in a rare screening by Film at Lincoln Center in February 2024 and concluded March 2024. Beatrice Loayza of The New York Times was quoted as saying, "...the hottest ticket in New York is a seven-hour-plus movie about Adolf Hitler." It screened over the course of a single day, 16 May 2026, at the Berkeley Art Museum and Pacific Film Archive.

=== Influence ===
The film was a considerable influence on, among others, critic Susan Sontag and philosopher Philippe Lacoue-Labarthe; Sontag called it "one of the 20th century’s greatest works of art". It provided the underlying metaphor for James Chapman's 1993 novel about AIDS, Our Plague: A Film from New York.

Sequences from Hitler: A Film from Germany are featured in the film The Ister (2004), which includes extensive interview footage of Syberberg.

=== English version ===
As the film was co-produced by the BBC, it was also issued in an English version. While all spoken monologues are subtitled in the English version, Heller's translated offstage narration is spoken by a BBC narrator. Due to the BBC's co-production, the German language used in the film, including the original World War II radio broadcasts and authentic speeches, receives a more sophisticated translation than in many US and British documentaries on Nazi Germany. One advantage of the English over the German version is that whenever a new character is introduced or an original recording is heard, the character's or speaker's name is displayed.

== See also ==
- List of longest films by running time
- Films dealing with Nazism and sexuality
