= The Devil Worshippers =

1921 film

- Directed by: Muhsin Ertuğrul
- Written by: Marie Luise Droop
- Based on: Karl May (novels)
- Produced by: Ustad Film Dr. Droop & Co.
- Starring: Carl de Vogt; Meinhart Maur; Bela Lugosi
- Cinematography: Joseph Rona
- Distributed by: Filmhaus Bruckmann & Co.
- Release date: 2 January 1921
- Running time: 76 minutes
- Country: Weimar Republic
- Language: Silent

The Devil Worshippers (German: Die Teufelsanbeter) is a six-chapter 1921 silent German film written by Marie Luise Droop, directed by Muhsin Ertuğrul and featuring Carl de Vogt in the title-role of Kara Ben Nemsi. De Vogt's career as an actor stretched into the 1960s, where he appeared in a number of the then-popular German crimi films. Later horror-star Bela Lugosi is also featured in one of his first supporting roles in a film, although his precise role in the film is unknown (some sources say he played a character called Pir Kamek).

The film was an adaptation of two Karl May novels (The Desert and Wild Kurdistan). It was one of the first German films to be based on the works of Karl May, who was normally known for his novels set in the old American West).

This film was the first of a trilogy of the production company "Ustad-Film" starring actor Carl de Vogt, but it was only released as the third in the cinemas. In several scenes, this black-and-white film has some coloring, e.g. blue for night scenes.

The film is said to have premiered on 2 January 1921 at "Vaters Lichtspiele" at Würzburg, but the first showing is only documented for 14 January 1921 at Wilhelmsburg. The film is now considered to be lost.

== Plot ==
The film is about a cult of devil worshippers called the Jesidi whose village is destroyed by an army general named Machrej under a religious pretext. When the village leader Kara ben Nemsi sees the devastation and learns that his people have been taken into captivity, he vows revenge. The ben Nemsi character, and his faithful servant Hadschi Halef Omar, appeared later in several other Karl May novels, all set in the Near East.

== Cast ==
- Carl de Vogt as Kara Ben Nemsi
- Meinhart Maur as Hadschi Halef Omar
- Tronier Funder as Officer
- Bela Lugosi as Pir Kamek
- Fred Immler
- Ilya Dubrowski
- Gustav Kirchberg
- Erwin Baron

== See also ==
- Karl May film adaptations
- Bela Lugosi filmography
