= Dora Gerson =

German actress (1899–1943)

- Dora Gerson in circa 1922 publicity photograph
- Born: Dorothea Gerson; 23 March 1899; Berlin, German Empire
- Died: 14 February 1943 (aged 43); Auschwitz-Birkenau, German-occupied Poland
- Occupations: Actress, singer
- Years active: 1920s
- Spouses: Veit Harlan (m. 1922; div. 1924) Max Sluizer (m. 1936)
- Children: 2

Dora Gerson (born Dorothea Gerson; 23 March 1899 – 14 February 1943) was a German cabaret singer and stage and motion picture actress of the silent film era. She was murdered at Auschwitz during the Holocaust.

== Life and career ==
Born Dorothea Gerson into a Jewish family in Berlin, Gerson began her career as a touring singer and actress in the Holtorf Tournee Truppe alongside actors Mathias Wieman and Ruth Hellberg in Germany, where she met and married her first husband, film director Veit Harlan. The couple married in 1922 and divorced in 1924. Harlan would later direct the antisemitic Nazi propaganda film Jud Süß (1940), supposedly at the insistence of Nazi Propaganda Minister Joseph Goebbels.

In 1920, Gerson was cast to appear in the film Auf den Trümmern des Paradieses (On the Brink of Paradise), an adaptation of the Karl May-penned novel Von Bagdad nach Stambul, and later followed that same year in another May adaptation titled Die Todeskarawane (Caravan of Death). Both films included Hungarian actor Béla Lugosi in the cast and are now believed to be lost films. Gerson continued performing as a popular cabaret singer throughout the 1920s and acting in films.

By 1933, when the Nazi Party came to power in Germany, the German-Jewish population was systematically stripped of rights, and Gerson's career slowed dramatically. Blacklisted from performing in "Aryan" films, Gerson began recording music for a small Jewish record company. She also began recording in the Yiddish language during this time, and the 1936 song "Der Rebe Hot Geheysn Freylekh Zayn" became highly regarded by the Jews of Europe in the 1930s. Gerson's most memorable recordings from this era were the German-language songs "Backbord und Steuerbord", and "Vorbei" (Beyond Recall), which was an emotional ballad memorializing pre-Nazi Germany:

They're gone beyond recall
A final glance, a last kiss
And then it's all over
under the frame of eternity
A final word, a last farewell

In 1936, Gerson relocated with relatives to the Netherlands, fleeing Nazi persecution. She married her second husband Max Sluizer (b. 24 June 1906). In 1938, she dubbed the voice of the Evil Queen in the German language film release of the 1937 American animated Walt Disney Productions film Snow White and the Seven Dwarfs for the German theatrical release in Amsterdam. However, the film was not shown publicly in Germany until 1951.

== Death ==
On 10 May 1940, Germany invaded the Netherlands, and the Jews there were subject to the same anti-Semitic laws and restrictions as in Germany. After several years of living under oppressive Nazi occupation, the Gerson family began to plan to escape. In 1942, Gerson and her family were seized trying to flee to Switzerland, a neutral nation in World War II Europe. The family was sent to Westerbork transit camp. On 11 February 1943 they were transported by railroad car to the Nazi camp of Auschwitz in Nazi-occupied Poland. Dora, her husband and their two children, Miriam Sluizer (b. 19 November 1937) and Abel Juda Sluizer (b. 21 May 1940), were all murdered at Auschwitz on 14 February 1943.

== Remembrance ==
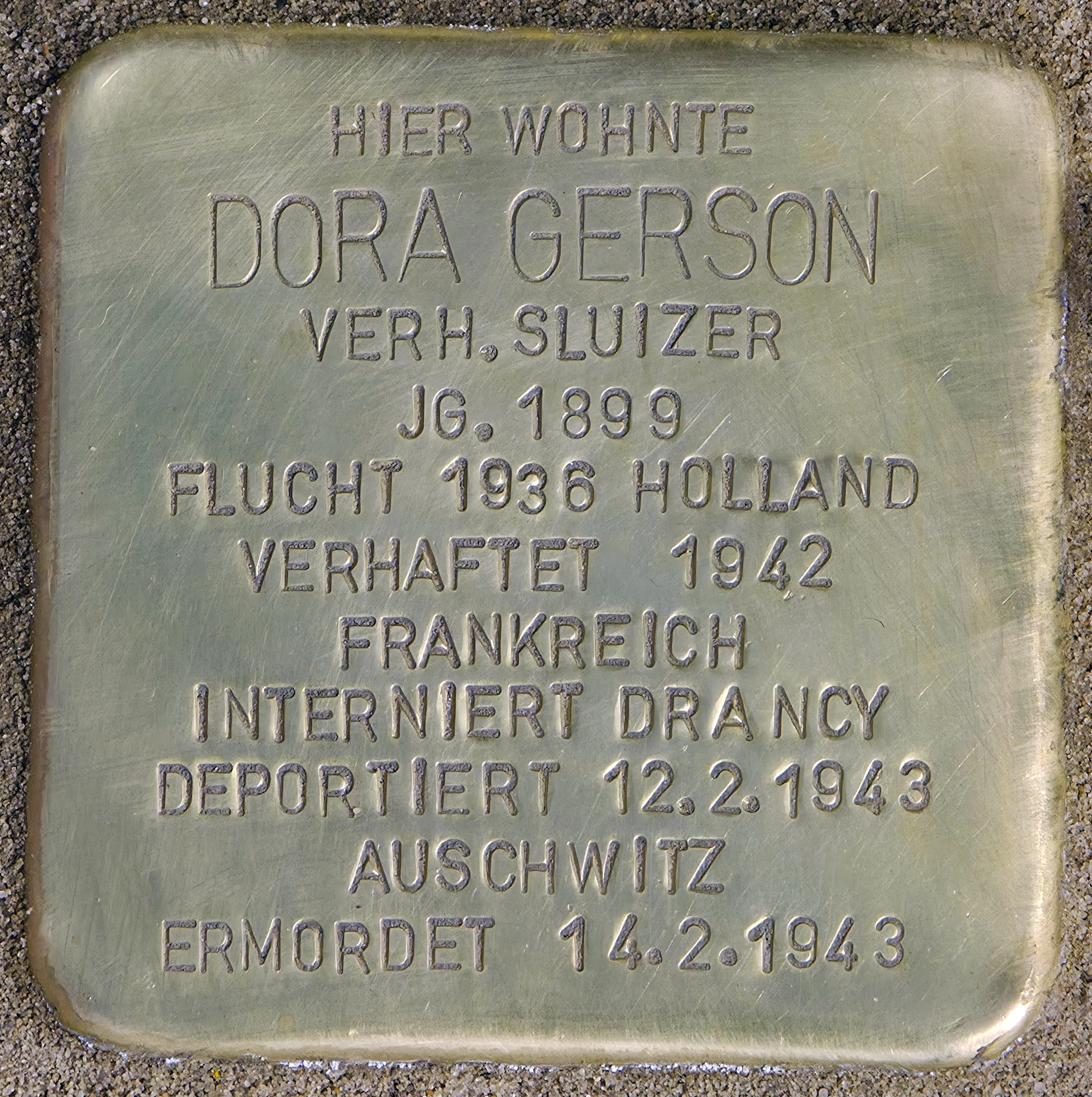
Gerson's stolpersteine on Bonner Straße 1, Berlin-Wilmersdorf.

A stolperstein in remembrance of Gerson, her husband and children stands in the village of Blaricum.

On 15 April 2026, a stolpersteine was laid outside of Gerson's former residence on Bonner Straße 1, Berlin-Wilmersdorf.

== Filmography ==
Year	Title	Role	Notes
1920	On the Brink of Paradise	Dschana Ardschir Mirza	
1920	Caravan of Death	Dschana Ardschir Mirza	
1938	Snow White and the Seven Dwarfs	Evil Queen	German language dubbing
