= Shatterhand (disambiguation) =

Shatterhand is a 1991 game for the Nintendo Entertainment System

Shatterhand may also refer to:

- Dr. Guntram Shatterhand, an alias used by the James Bond villain, Ernst Stavro Blofeld
- Shatterhand, a rumoured working title for the James Bond film No Time to Die
- Old Shatterhand, a character in the American Wild West novels of Karl May
  - Old Shatterhand (film), a 1964 film based on Karl May's works
- Villa Shatterhand, the Italian Renaissance residence of Karl May in Radebeul, Saxony
