= 348 May =

Main-belt asteroid

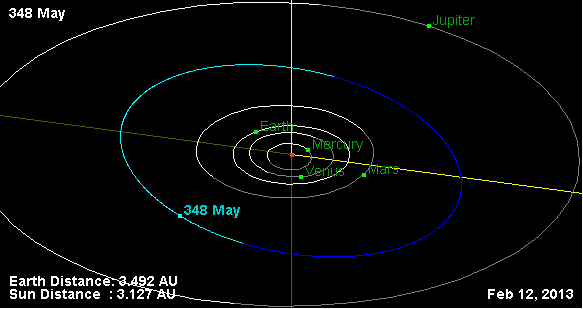
- Orbital diagram

Discovery
- Discovered by: Auguste Charlois
- Discovery date: 28 November 1892

Designations
- Pronunciation: German: [ˈmaɪ]
- Named after: Probably Karl May
- Alternative designations: 1892 R
- Minor planet category: Main belt

Orbital characteristics
- Epoch 31 July 2016 (JD 2457600.5)
- Uncertainty parameter 0
- Observation arc: 123.36 yr (45,056 d)
- Aphelion: 3.16969 AU (474.179 Gm)
- Perihelion: 2.76919 AU (414.265 Gm)
- Semi-major axis: 2.96944 AU (444.222 Gm)
- Eccentricity: 0.067437
- Orbital period (sidereal): 5.12 yr (1,869.0 d)
- Mean anomaly: 21.8117°
- Mean motion: 0° 11^{m} 33.418^{s} / day
- Inclination: 9.74506°
- Longitude of ascending node: 90.0424°
- Argument of perihelion: 13.4397°

Physical characteristics
- Mean diameter: 82.82±2.2 km
- Mass: (7.6±2.8)×10^{17} kg (Note: Calculated from its standard gravitational parameter GM = 0.051±0.019 km^{3}/s^{2}.)
- Mean density: 2.57 g/cm^{3}
- Synodic rotation period: 7.3812 h (0.30755 d)
- Geometric albedo: 0.0448±0.002
- Spectral type: X
- Absolute magnitude (H): 9.58

348 May is a large Main belt asteroid. It was discovered by Auguste Charlois on 28 November 1892 in Nice, and was named for the German author Karl May. This asteroid is orbiting the Sun at a distance of 2.97 AU with a period of 5.12 years and an eccentricity (ovalness) of 0.067. The orbital plane is inclined at an angle of 9.7° to the plane of the ecliptic. During its orbit, this asteroid has made close approaches to the dwarf planet Ceres. For example, in September 1984 the two were separated by 6.3 Gm (0.042 AU).

Analysis of the asteroid light curve generated from photometric data collected during 2007 provided a rotation period of 7.385±0.004 h with a brightness variation of 0.16±0.03 in magnitude. This is consistent with an estimate from a 2006 study. It is classified as a G-type asteroid and spans a diameter of approximately 83 km.
