= Heinz Schubert =

Heinz Schubert may refer to:

- Heinz Schubert (actor) (1925–1999), German actor, drama teacher and photographer
- Heinz Schubert (composer) (1908–1945), German composer and conductor
- Heinz Schubert (SS officer) (1914–1987), German SS officer, sentenced to death, commuted to 10 years, at the Einsatzgruppen Trial in 1948
