= RIH =

Dutch bicycle manufacturer

RIH Cové b.v.
- Logo on a Head badge
- Type: Private
- Industry: Bicycles
- Founded: 1921
- Founder: Willem Bustraan, Joop Bustraan
- Headquarters: Groot Bollerweg 12, 5928 NS Venlo-Blerick, Venlo, Netherlands
- Number of locations: Westerstraat 150,
- Website: rih.nl rihsport.com

RIH is a Dutch bicycle manufacturer. The company is one of the last private bicycle builders in the Netherlands.

RIH has its origins in three companies: RIH Sport in Amsterdam, Fongers from Groningen and Cové from Limburg.

== History ==
RIH was founded in 1921 by Willem (Wim) and Joop Bustraan at Westerstraat 150 situated in the working-class neighborhood Jordaan, Amsterdam. In 1928, Willem Bustraan Jr. joined the business with his father and his uncle.

The two brothers handed over the business to Willem Jr. in 1948. He then teamed up with Wim van der Kaaij who had learned the trade from an early age always helping in the shop as an apprentice. He was the sole owner of the business and still built frames until into his 70s, mostly track (racing) bikes. He died in 2014.

Through the 1960s Fongers built lightweights in series under the RIH name, but this cooperation ended when Batavus-Intercycle acquired Fongers in 1970.

About that time, in 1972, RIH started a collaboration with the Cové Fietsfabriek from Venlo. Later, Cové acquired the right to sell normal bicycles under the brand name RIH on the market.

The company was the first Dutch frame builder that could build lightweight frames. In 2014, the firm moved to Gedempt Hamerkanaal 77, 1021KP HL Amsterdam (NH) (nowadays RIH Sport Amsterdam).

== Racing ==
RIH's first championship was in 1924 when Jan Hijzelendoorn rode a Bustraan brothers' frame to the sprint and 1 kilometer titles in the Dutch National Championship.

When during the 1950s large sponsored cycling teams entered the stage, RIH's successes deteriorated because henceforth the sponsors decided which material was used. This was a major change because until that time the individual riders took that decision. However, when RIH became material sponsor for the Dutch national cycling federation Royal Dutch Cycling Union (KNWU) between 1989 and 1996, the company was able to build on past successes.

In 1990 Leontien van Moorsel won her first world title in the individual pursuit. Ingrid Haringa was world champion 1991 in sprint and 1991, 1993 and 1994 world champion in the points race. It is estimated that RIH frames have been ridden to over and 63 world and Olympic titles.

All in all, RIH bikes were ridden 350 national championships and 63 world championships and Olympic gold medals in both road and track events.

Among RIH's customers was Gerrit Schulte, pursuit world champion in 1948 (beating the great Fausto Coppi), Arie van Vliet, Jan Derksen and Jan Pronk. During his professional career, Peter Post only rode on frames built by Willem Bustraan (both on the track and road). Even when riding for Willem II–Gazelle and Flandria, the RIH-built frames were painted in the team colors of his sponsor, and rebranded into Flandria or Gazelle.

== Trivia ==
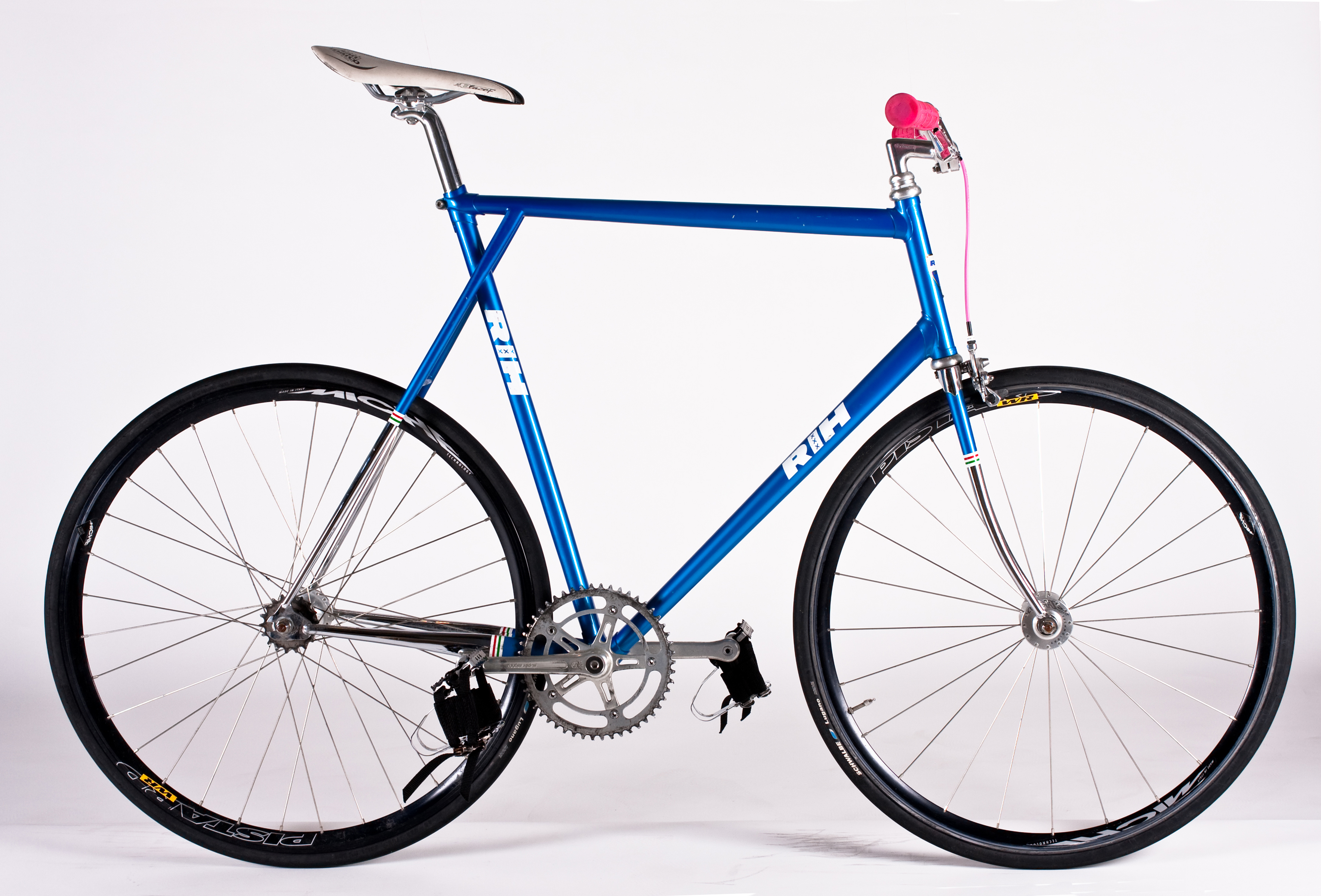
2001 RIH track bike converted for street use. Vintage RIH frames are more and more sought after by Dutch bike enthusiasts.

It has been suggested that RIH stands for Dutch: Rijwiel Industrie Holland (English: Bicycle Industry Holland). However, one of the founders noted in an interview that RIH was named after Kara Ben Nemsi's horse (from Arabic: fast as the wind), a character from the books of Karl May.

The intertwined "GB" in the company's logo stands for "Brothers Bustraan" (Dutch: Gebroeders Bustraan).

== See also ==
- List of bicycle brands and manufacturing companies

== Videos ==
- RIH Sport Amsterdam
- Building a RIH Bike - Part 1
- Building a RIH Bike - Part 2
