= Josef Stein =

- Born: 2 February 1876; Vienna, Austria
- Died: 16 June 1937 (aged 61); Prague, Czechoslovakia
- Occupations: Film director Producer
- Years active: 1917–1925

Josef Stein (2 February 1876 – 16 June 1937) was an Austrian film director and producer. He contributed to more than thirty films from 1917 to 1937.

== Selected filmography ==
Director
Year	Title	Notes
1920	Caravan of Death	
1920	On the Brink of Paradise	

Producer
Year	Title	Notes
1927	The Awakening of Woman	
1927	Students' Love	
1929	Tragedy of Youth	
1929	Dive	
1930	Helene Willfüer, Student of Chemistry	
1931	The Case of Colonel Redl	
1936	Delightful Story	
1937	The World Is Ours	
1937	Děvče za výkladem	
