= Gabriel Ferry =

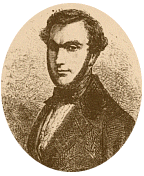
- Gabriel Ferry the Elder

Gabriel Ferry is the pen name of two French writers, father and son.

== Gabriel Ferry the Elder ==
The elder, Eugène Louis Gabriel Ferry de Bellemare (November 1809 Grenoble - 3 January 1852), wrote adventure novels. He spent 10 years in Mexico. He died at the age of 41 on his way to California, when the ship Amazon sunk in the Bay of Biscay after a fire probably caused by the engine bearings overheating. His most famous novel Le Coureur de Bois was 1879 revised for young readers under the title Der Waldläufer by the German writer Karl May.

=== Writings ===
Some of these works may actually be by Ferry the Younger:

- Une guerre en Sonora; souvenirs des côtes de l'Océan Pacifique, 1846
- Capitaine Don Blas et les jarochos, scenes de la vie mexicaine, 1848
- La clairière du bois des Hogues, récit des cotes et de la mer, 1851
- Impressions de voyages et aventures dans le Mexique, la Haute Californie et les régions de l'or, 1851
- Costal l'Indien ; roman historique. Scènes de la guerre de l'indépendance du Mexique, 1852
- Le crime du bois des Hogues, 1853
- Cabecillas y guerrilleros; scènes de la vie militaire au Mexique..., 1853
- Vagabond life in Mexico, 1856
- Le Coureur des bois, 1853 - Livre national-Aventures et Voyages N° 28 - Éditions Phébus (November 2009) ISBN 978-2-7529-0423-2
- La chasse aux Cosaques, 1854
- Les aventures du capitaine Ruperto Castaños au Mexique, 1878
- Scènes de la vie sauvage au Mexique, 1879
- Les aventures d'un Français au pays des caciques, 1881

== Gabriel Ferry the Younger ==
The younger (b. 30 May 1846) was at first connected with a bank, but soon followed in his father's footsteps and devoted himself to literature.

=== Writings ===
The younger Ferry wrote a number of plays, Réginah (1874), being one of the best. His miscellaneous prose includes Les dernières années d'Alexandre Dumas (Paris 1882); Les patriotes de 1816 (Paris 1883); Les deux maris de Marthe (Paris 1884); Balzac et ses amies (Paris 1888); Cap de fer (Paris 1889); Les exploits de César (Paris 1889); Les exploits de Martin (Paris 1890); Les prouesses de Martin Robert (Paris 1890) and others.
