= Detektivbüro Roth =

German television series

- Starring: Manfred Krug as Bruno Roth; Peter Seum as Uli Roth; Eva Maria Bauer as Olga Roth; Ute Willing as Ricarda; Klaus Löwitsch as Albert Löffelhardt; Horst A. Fechner as Franz; Hildegard Krekel as Irene; Herbert Steinmetz as Bernhardt Crentz; Alexander Herzog; Wolfried Lier as Oskar; Heinz Schubert as Egon Fetzer; Ilja Richter as Knappstatt
- Opening theme: Frank Duval
- Country of origin: Germany
- No. of seasons: 2
- No. of episodes: 35

Production
- Running time: 45

Original release
- Release: 22 April 1986

Detektivbüro Roth is a German television series.

Bruno Roth (Manfred Krug) maintains in an old villa in Berlin Lichtenfeld, the Detektivbüro Roth - together with Olga (Eva Maria Bauer), the wife of his deceased brother, her son Uli (Peter Seum) and his girlfriend Ricarda (Ute Willing). It identifies in cases of industrial espionage, insurance fraud, personal protection, sabotage, drug offenses, legacy hunting or art forgery. Bruno Roth is a clever, self-assured and profit thoughtful man who accepts only worthwhile cases. Not so the case Duisburg detective Löffelhardt. Albert Löffelhardt (Klaus Löwitsch), housed in an old mom-and-pop store and has some parallels to his colleagues television Schimanski. Because he must constantly fight for its existence, it assumes any case . To overlap the regions of the two investigators, they forced to work together, even if it always comes back to conflict. Between the two detectives to a kind of competition develops, as they always come back despite all the friendship intentionally or unintentionally in the way. Eventually it will Löffelhardt too much and he disappears from the scene. Egon Fetzer (Heinz Schubert) takes over his shop (episodes 24–35), to bring him finally to success and to found a detective academy. His first student is Knappstatt (Ilja Richter), who had studied theology and law, before he decided to become a detective.

== See also ==
- List of German television series
