= The Black Tulip Festival =

1920 German silent film

- Directed by: Marie Luise Droop; Muhsin Ertugrul
- Written by: Alexandre Dumas (novel); Marie Luise Droop
- Produced by: Marie Luise Droop
- Starring: Theodor Becker; Carl de Vogt; Meinhart Maur
- Cinematography: Gustave Preiss
- Production company: Ustad Film
- Release date: 30 October 1920
- Running time: 82 minutes
- Country: Germany
- Languages: Silent; German intertitles

The Black Tulip Festival (German: Das Fest der schwarzen Tulpe) is a 1920 German silent historical film directed by Marie Luise Droop and Muhsin Ertugrul and starring Theodor Becker, Carl de Vogt, and Meinhart Maur. It is based on the novel The Black Tulip by Alexandre Dumas.

== Cast ==
- Theodor Becker as Johann de Witt
- Carl de Vogt as Adrian Witt
- Meinhart Maur as Isaac Tichelaer
- Tronier Funder as Oberst de Tilly
- Helga Hall as Marion de Tilly
- Otto Sommerstorff as Cornelius de Witt
- Friedrich Berger
- Max Pohl
- Erich Poremski
- Emil Stammer
- Mathilde Sussin
- Aribert Wäscher
- Toni Zimmerer

== Bibliography ==
- Leaman, Oliver (2003). Companion Encyclopedia of Middle Eastern and North African Film. London: Routledge. ISBN 978-1-134-66252-4.
