= The Last Barricade =

1938 film

- Greta Gynt, Paul Sheridan and Frank Fox in a scene from the film.
- Directed by: Alex Bryce
- Written by: Alex Bryce; Robert Gore Brown; Lawrence Green
- Produced by: John Findlay
- Starring: Frank Fox; Greta Gynt; Meinhart Maur
- Cinematography: Stanley Grant
- Production company: 20th Century Fox
- Distributed by: 20th Century Fox
- Release date: 17 October 1938
- Running time: 58 minutes
- Country: United Kingdom
- Language: English

The Last Barricade is a 1938 British drama film directed by Alex Bryce and starring Frank Fox, Greta Gynt and Meinhart Maur. It was written by Bryce, Robert Gore Brown and Lawrence Green.

== Cast ==
- Frank Fox as Michael Donovan
- Greta Gynt as Maria
- Paul Sheridan as Valdez
- Meinhart Maur as Don Jose
- Dino Galvani as Lopez
- Vernon Harris as Captain Lee
- Hay Petrie as Captain MacTavish
- Andreas Malandrinos as General

== Production ==
The film was produced by the British subsidiary of 20th Century Fox at the company's Wembley Studios in London for release as a Quota Quickie. The film's sets were designed by the art director Carmen Dillon.

== Reception ==
The Monthly Film Bulletin wrote: "Photography and acting are reasonable, but many of the incidents, such as Maria's under-fire dash to the factory, and her rescue from prison, are wildly improbable."

Kine Weekly wrote: "The director and principal players do their best in the circumstances, but the theme is too lightly written to permit of convincing interpretation. Dramatically the play is nebulous. Quota oftering for the unsophisticated only."

Picture Show wrote: "Deftly directed, competently acted, with convincing settings."

The Daily Film Renter wrote: "Modest production, providing adequate suspense borne of the fighting on both sides, this makes average popular quota offering. ... The picture has some interesting shots of the war, while a frustrated attempt to mine the factory provides fair suspense. Acting is of a reasonable standard, Frank Fox making a fair if unethical reporter, while Greta Gynt is an attractive heroine. Meinhart Maur is convincing as the doctor, while Paul Sheridan does good work as the Spanish commandant."

Picturegoer wrote: "A very artless melodrama ... Frank Fox is weak in the lead, and the supporting cast can make little of the parts they are given."
