= Ruth's Two Husbands =

- Directed by: Rudolf Biebrach
- Written by: Henrik Galeen; Robert Wiene
- Starring: Henny Porten; Curt Goetz; Meinhart Maur
- Cinematography: Willy Gaebel
- Music by: Giuseppe Becce
- Production company: Messter Film
- Distributed by: UFA
- Release date: 25 July 1919
- Country: Germany
- Languages: Silent; German intertitles

Ruth's Two Husbands (German: Die beiden Gatten der Frau Ruth) is a 1919 German silent film directed by Rudolf Biebrach and starring Henny Porten, Curt Goetz and Meinhart Maur.

The film's sets were designed by Kurt Dürnhöfer and Jack Winter

== Cast ==
- Henny Porten as Ruth Elvstedt
- Curt Goetz as Ingenieur Robert Holversen
- Meinhart Maur as Notar Lars Sidellius
- Paul Passarge
- Erich Schönfelder as Baron Alfred Alberg
- Elsa Wagner
- Else Wojan
- Emmy Wyda

== Bibliography ==
- Alfred Krautz. International directory of cinematographers, set- and costume designers in film, Volume 4. Saur, 1984.
