= Karl May Museum =

Museum in Radebeul, Germany

Coordinates: 51.1027°N 13.6735°E

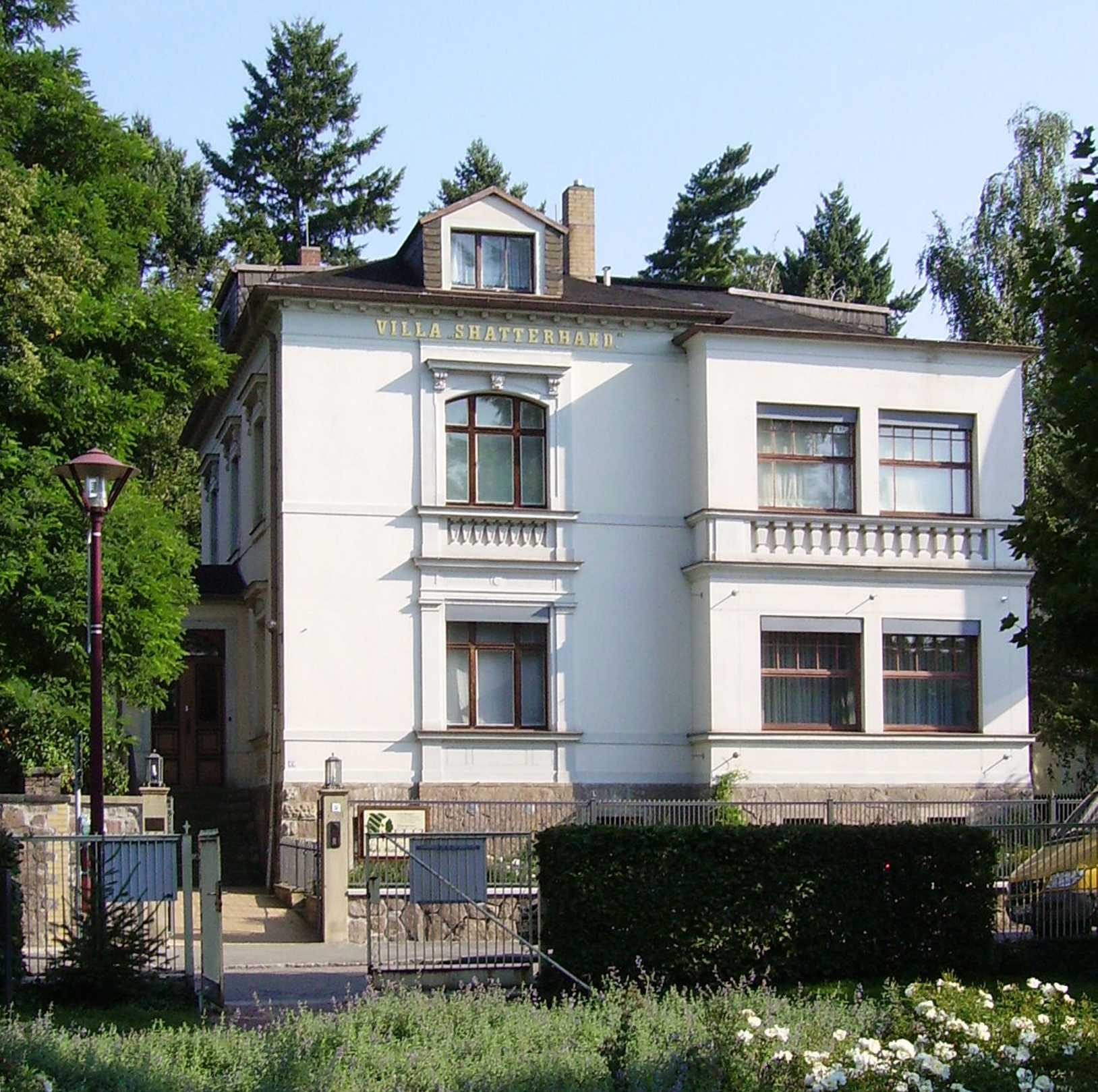
Villa Shatterhand

The Karl May Museum is a museum in Radebeul, Germany named after the German author Karl May, containing artifacts from May's life as well as a worldwide ethnographic and art collections with emphasis on the life on the American frontier and Native American life of that era. It is located in Villa Shatterhand, May's Italian Renaissance home, and Villa Bärenfett, a log cabin built in the garden that was the founding core of the museum. The main house was opened to the public after Klara May's death.

== Museum history ==
German author Karl May (1842–1912) wrote many books about the American frontier and Native Americans featuring the fictional characters Winnetou (a Mescalero-Apache Chief) and Old Shatterhand (a white European settler). Mays' books were popular in Germany and created a mystique about the "Wild West" in German popular culture.

The museum opened in 1928 in Radebeul, in the house where May had lived, called Villa Shatterhand. It was founded during a peak of interest in the US frontier and Native Americans, fostered in part by the Sarrasani circus, which was headquartered in nearby Dresden, and which was very popular in the 1920s. Sarassani and Native American members of the circus came to the opening, and the Native Americans performed death songs for May.

The museum was founded by May's widow and an eccentric Austrian named Ernst Tobis, who was a fan of May's work and had travelled to the American frontier, and liked to tell tall tales about his time there. Tobis donated a large collection of artifacts to help found the museum's collection, which included 17 scalps, some of them from Native Americans.

When the Nazis took over Germany, they appropriated the museum and the image of May, and were especially focused on swastikas that appeared in some of the Native American artwork. Hitler Youth were encouraged to visit the museum and to hear stories from Tobis.

After World War II, the original museum was in East Germany and a replica was built in Bamberg in West Germany. A person who called himself Chief Buffalo Child Long Lance became associated with the museum shortly after the war ended.

From 1956 to 1984, the museum in Radebeul was called the "Indianer Museum", because May's books were suppressed by the East German government, in part because of the association with the Nazis, but also because the books were viewed as leading people to want to travel, which the government did not allow. During the Cold War placards in the museum in Radebeul and its displays were refactored to describe oppression of Native Americans by the US, as part of Soviet propaganda efforts to rally indigenous people against the West. Some East Germans also did work with the American Indian Movement.

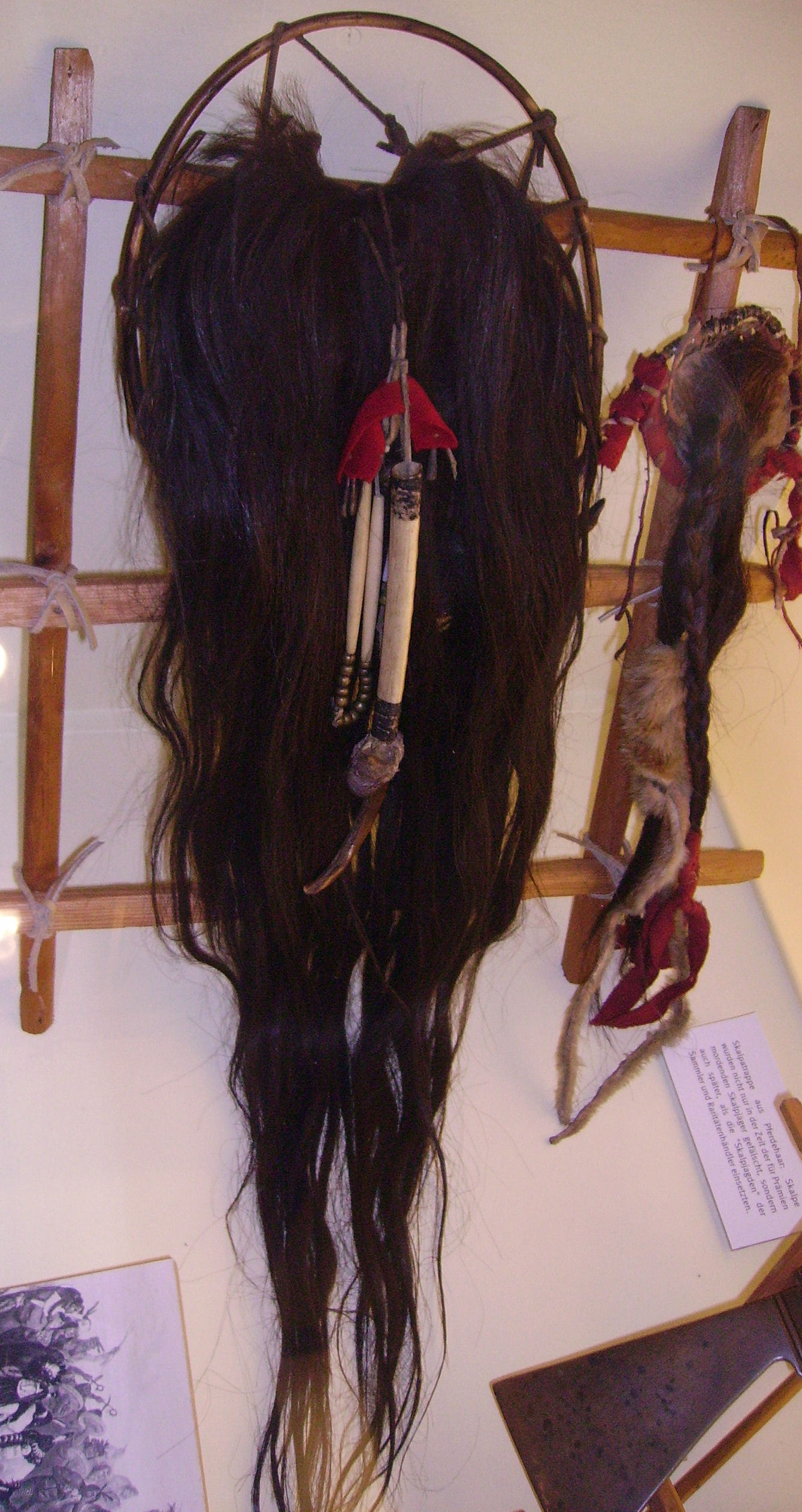
Scalp exhibited at the museum

The museum in Radebeul was given its original name again in 1986, as the East German government moved to reclaim May. The renaming led to an exhibition focused on May in February, which had 4,000 visitors a day, and people waited for three hours outside to get in. After the Berlin Wall fell in 1989, attendance at the Radebeul museum dropped from around 300,000 people per year to around 60,000, as people could travel to the US instead of visiting the museum, which had been one of the only sources of information about Native Americans in East Germany.

In 2010, according to the South China Morning Post, US activists began seeking repatriation of the scalps. Berlin-based journalist Mark Worth brought the scalps to the attention of Karen Little Coyote of the Cheyenne and Arapaho Tribes, who wrote a letter asking for the scalps to be returned in the fall of 2013. In 2013, the German Museums Association issued a guideline on the care of human remains, listing scalps from peoples who "fashioned trophies from the heads of their killed enemies" as an exception to "human remains acquired in a context of injustice". In March 2014, Cecil E. Pavlat, who works on return of artifacts for the Sault Ste. Marie Tribe of Chippewa Indians, wrote a letter asking for return of the scalps. The scalp was returned in 2021.

The director of the museum in Radebeul from 1985 to 2014 was René Wagner; Christian Wacker was appointed director in 2018.

The museum is still collecting modern and contemporary art and archival material relating to the existing collections and received a donation of new artifacts in 2018.
