= Marah Durimeh =

Fictional character from Karl May's novels around Kara Ben Nemsi

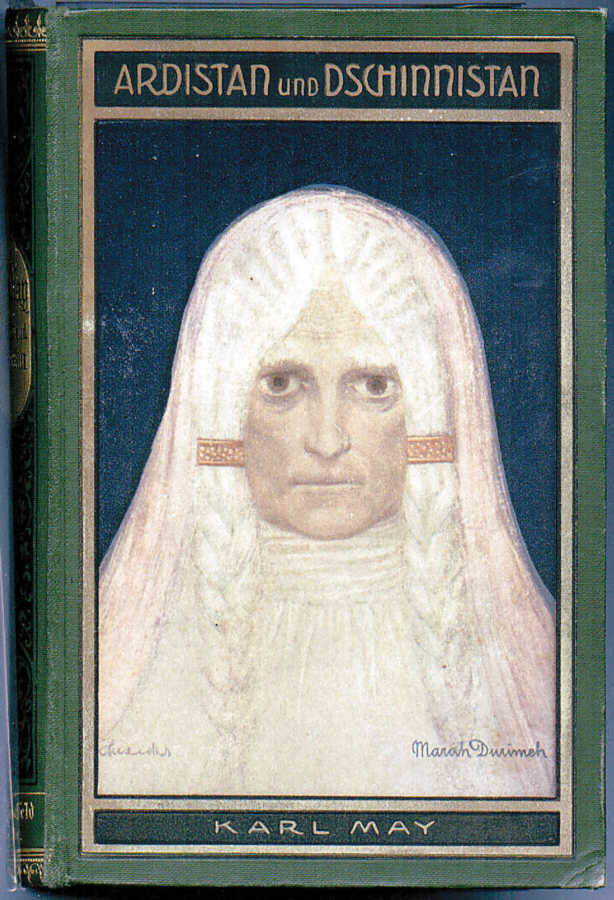
"Marah Durimeh" by Sascha Schneider

Marah Durimeh is a fictional character from Karl May's novels around Kara Ben Nemsi. Her real identity is Ruh'i Kulyan (ghost of the cave). She is known as Es Sahira (the magician) to Kurds. Durimeh is a Kurdish princess and widow of a famous king. She is said to have written several books.

Karl May intended to write several novels about her, similar to the Winnetou series, but he never got to it. The character changed from the wild and ugly creature of early publications to what he understood as the female Orient counterpart to the Indian chief Winnetou, both personifying mysticism and the ascent from a low, lustful person, rising to become a nobly spirited person. Several times it is referred to her as the soul of mankind. He states in his autobiography that he modelled the character after his own grandmother, with whom he was very close and who raised him in his early childhood, especially during his blindness.

== Original German stories ==
- Durchs wilde Kurdistan (1892)
- Im Reiche des silbernen Löwen II (1898)
- Babel und Bibel - Arabische Fantasia in zwei Akten (1906, drama)
- Ardistan und Dschinnistan I (1909)
- Ardistan und Dschinnistan II (1909)

There are many references to her:

- Von Bagdad nach Stambul (1892)
- Im Reiche des silbernen Löwen III (1902)
- Im Reiche des silbernen Löwen IV (1903)
- Und Friede auf Erden! (1904)
- Winnetou IV (1910)

== Durimeh's role in the novels ==
She is aunt of Abd el Fadl, great aunt of Pedehr, great grandmother of Shakira and a friend of Ustad. Ahriman Mirza thinks of her as his principal opponent. Kara Ben Nemsi meets these persons many times and also encounters her often. Durimeh and he have long discussions about religion.

More than hundred years of age, she has still retained her power and she is highly regarded by everyone. She ends violent fights between different ethnic groups.

== Movies with "Marah Durimeh" ==
- 1920: "Auf den Trümmern des Paradieses", silent movie believed to be lost. Played by Anna von Palen
- 1965: "Im Reiche des silbernen Löwen" (at imdb.com), one of the German Karl May movies of the 1960s with the American actor Lex Barker as Karl May alter-egos like Kara Ben Nemsi. Played by Anne-Marie Blanc.
