= The Howling Wolf =

1919 film

- Carl Auen (left) as Joe Deebs
- Directed by: Léo Lasko
- Written by: Richard Hutter
- Produced by: Paul Davidson
- Starring: Carl Auen; Meinhart Maur; Victor Janson
- Production company: PAGU
- Distributed by: UFA
- Release date: December 1919
- Country: Germany
- Languages: Silent; German intertitles

The Howling Wolf (German: Der heulende Wolf) is a 1919 German silent crime film directed by Léo Lasko and starring Carl Auen, Meinhart Maur and Victor Janson. It was part of a series of films featuring the detective character Joe Deebs.

It was shot at the Templehof Studios in Berlin. The film's sets were designed by the art director Kurt Richter.

== Cast ==
- Carl Auen as Joe Deebs, Detektiv
- Meinhart Maur
- Victor Janson
- Albert Patry

== Bibliography ==
- Ken Wlaschin. Silent Mystery and Detective Movies: A Comprehensive Filmography. McFarland, 2009.
- Hans-Michael Bock & Michael Töteberg. Das Ufa-Buch. Zweitausendeins, 1992.
