= Meinhart Maur =

Hungarian-German actor (1891–1964)

- Born: Menyhért Grünbaum; 18 August 1891; Hajdúnánás, Austria-Hungary
- Died: 27 November 1964 (aged 73); London, England
- Other name: Meinhardt Maur
- Occupation: Actor
- Years active: 1919–1954

Meinhart Maur (Hungarian: Grünbaum Menyhért, 18 August 1891 – 27 November 1964) was a Hungarian-German film actor. He appeared in more than 40 films between 1919 and 1954. He was born in Hajdúnánás into a Jewish family. He fled Nazi Germany in 1936 and settled in London, where he died in 1964.

== Selected filmography ==
- The Howling Wolf (1919)
- Die Tragödie der Manja Orsan (1919) – Jean Tanda – Jurist
- Flimmersterne (1919)
- Ruth's Two Husbands (1919) – Notar Lars Sidellius
- Moderne Töchter (1919)
- The Teahouse of the Ten Lotus Flowers (1919) – Wissenschaftler Dr. Yotamo
- Das Geheimnis des Irren (1919)
- Harakiri (1919) – Prince Matahari
- Kinder der Liebe, 2. Teil (1919)
- Die Toten kehren wieder – Enoch Arden (1919) – Chang-Pu
- Die Nackten – Ein sozialpolitischer Film (1919)
- Die Dame im Pelz (1919) – Graf Sacher-Khun (Maler)
- Der Kampf um die Ehe – 2. Teil: Feindliche Gatten (1919)
- Der Kampf um die Ehe – 1. Teil: Wenn in der Ehe die Liebe stirbt (1919)
- Die silberne Fessel (1920) – Hofnarr
- Die Spinnen, 2. Teil – Das Brillantenschiff (1920) – Chinese Spider
- Sybill Morgan (1920)
- Wibbel the Tailor (1920) – Gefängnisschliesser
- Va banque (1920) – Krojanker
- Nobody Knows (1920) – Ein Gast
- Auf den Trümmern des Paradieses (1920) – Hadschi Halef Omar / Saduk
- The Black Tulip Festival (1920) – Isaac Tichelaer
- Die Todeskarawane (1920) – Hadschi Halef Omar
- Berlin W. (1920) – Chefredakteur Nebeling
- Zügelloses Blut. 2. Die Diamantenfalle (1920)
- Zügelloses Blut. 1. Luxusfieber (1920)
- Die Teufelsanbeter (1920) – Hadschi Halef Omar
- Dämmernde Nächte (1920) – Jörn Skaare
- The Last Witness (1921)
- Elixiere des Teufels (1922)
- The Voice of the Heart (1924) – Helgas Vater
- Regine (1927) – Der Diener
- The Trunks of Mr. O.F. (1931) – Arzt
- Rembrandt (1936) – Ornia (uncredited)
- Second Bureau (1936) – Gen. von Raugwitz
- O-Kay for Sound (1937) – Guggenheimer
- Doctor Syn (1937) – Mulatto
- The Last Barricade (1938) – Don Jose
- Who Goes Next? (1938) – Commandant
- The Return of the Frog (1938) – 'Dutchy' Alkmann
- 21 Days (1940) – Carl Grunlich
- An Englishman's Home (1940) – Waldo
- Pack Up Your Troubles (1940) – (uncredited)
- Band Waggon (1940) – German General (uncredited)
- Three Silent Men (1940) – Karl Zaroff
- Jeannie (1941)
- We'll Smile Again (1942) – Herr Steiner
- Candlelight in Algeria (1944) – Schultz
- It's Not Cricket (1949) – Maharajah
- The Huggetts Abroad (1949) – Jeweller
- The Wooden Horse (1950) – Hotel Proprietor
- Dick Barton at Bay (1950) – Serge Volkoff
- The Tales of Hoffmann (1951) – Luther
- Decameron Nights (1953) – Sultan
- Never Let Me Go (1953) – Lemkov
- Epitaph for a Spy (1953) – Herr Vogel
- Stand by to Shoot (1953) - Becki
- Malaga (1954) – Jakie (uncredited)
