= Hadschi Halef Omar =

- Created by: Karl May
- Portrayed by: Meinhart Maur; Heinz Evelt; Ralf Wolter; Heinz Schubert

In-universe information
- Occupation: Adventurer

Hadschi Halef Omar Ben Hadschi Abul Abbas Ibn Hadschi Dawud al Gossarah, literally hajji Halef Omar, son of hajji father-of-Abbas, son of hajji David al Gossarah, is one of Karl May's literary characters. Hajji means "one who has performed the Muslim pilgrimage to Mecca".

Halef is the exceedingly loyal servant, companion and friend of German adventurer Kara Ben Nemsi. Halef accompanies Kara Ben Nemsi through all his adventures in the Middle East from Durch die Wüste to Der Schut. He is a very devout Muslim, and throughout the adventures with Kara Ben Nemsi he tries to convince him of the superiority of Islam.

After many adventures he became Scheik of the Haddedihn of the great tribe of the Schammar. He is married to Hanneh, the "most beautiful wife on earth", and with her has a son called Kara Ben Halef, who in later novels also has some adventures.

The German disco group Dschinghis Khan also released a song entitled "Hadschi Halef Omar" on their 1980 album "Rom." The entire chorus is basically reciting Halef's name.

== Original German stories ==
- Durch Wüste und Harem (1892), since 1895 with the title Durch die Wüste
- Durchs wilde Kurdistan (1892)
- Von Bagdad nach Stambul (1892)
- In den Schluchten des Balkan (1892)
- Durch das Land der Skipetaren (1892)
- Der Schut (1892)
- Eine Ghasuah (in Orangen und Datteln, 1893)
- Nûr es Semâ. – Himmelslicht (in Orangen und Datteln, 1893)
- Christi Blut und Gerechtigkeit (in Orangen und Datteln, 1893)
- Mater dolorosa (in Orangen und Datteln, 1893)
- Im Lande des Mahdi III (1896)
- Blutrache (in Auf fremden Pfaden, 1897)
- Der Kys-Kaptschiji (in Auf fremden Pfaden, 1897)
- Maria oder Fatima (in Auf fremden Pfaden, 1897)
- Im Reiche des silbernen Löwen I (1898)
- Die »Umm ed Dschamahl« (1898)
- Im Reiche des silbernen Löwen II (1898)
- Am Jenseits (1899)
- Im Reiche des silbernen Löwen III (1902)
- Im Reiche des silbernen Löwen IV (1903)
- Bei den Aussätzigen (1907)
- Abdahn Effendi (1908)
- Merhameh (1909)
- Ardistan und Dschinnistan I (1909)
- Ardistan und Dschinnistan II (1909)

Within the book series Karl May’s Gesammelte Werke there is a sequel of Am Jenseits: „In Mekka“ (1923) by Franz Kandolf.

== Film actors ==
- Halef was played in silent movies (1920/21) by Meinhart Maur.
- In the first Karl May sound-movie Durch die Wüste (1936) he was played by Heinz Evelt.
- In the Karl May movies of the 1950s actor Georg Thomalla played Halef.
- In the TV-series Mit Karl May im Orient (1963) Osman Ragheb played Halef.
- In the Karl May movies of the 1960s Halef was played by Ralf Wolter.
- In the TV-series Kara Ben Nemsi Effendi (1973/75) he was played by Heinz Schubert.
