= Karl May =

German author (1842–1912)

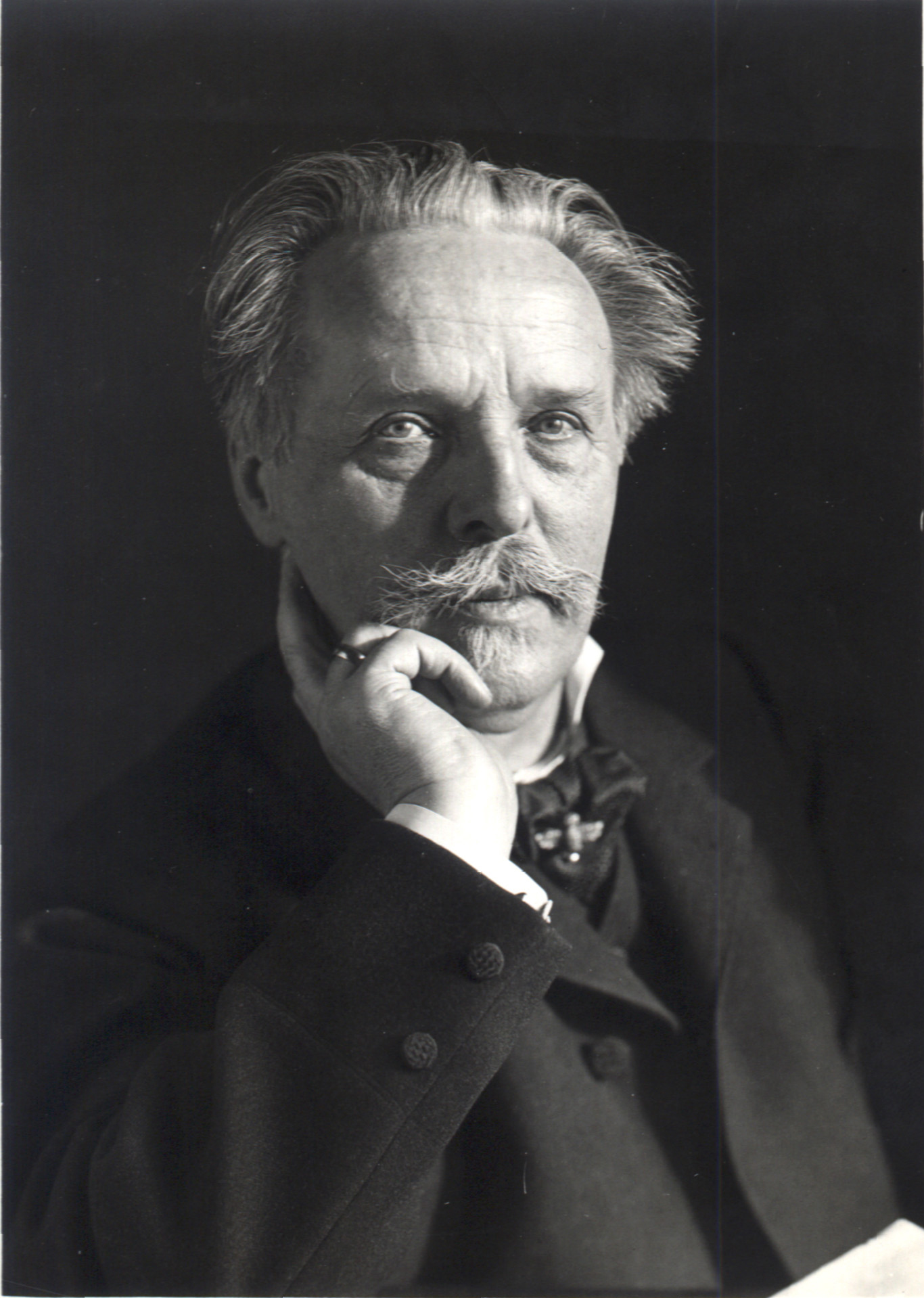
- Born: Karl Friedrich May; 25 February 1842; Ernstthal, Kingdom of Saxony, German Confederation
- Died: 30 March 1912 (aged 70); Radebeul, Kingdom of Saxony, German Empire
- Occupations: Writer, author
- Spouse: Emma Pollmer (m. 1880; div. 1903)
- Writing career
- Genres: Western, travel fiction, German homeland novels, adventure novels
- Website: www.karl-may-gesellschaft.de

Karl Friedrich May (/maɪ/ MY, German: [kaʁl ˈmaɪ]; 25 February 1842 – 30 March 1912) was a German author known for travel writing. His works, often in first-person narratives about travels and adventures, were mostly set in the American Old West or the Orient and Middle East, but also in Latin America, China and within Germany. For a time he insisted that he actually had travelled to the West and was called Old Shatterhand there, while in the Ottoman Empire he was called Kara Ben Nemsi, and posed in costumes.

May is one of the best-selling German writers of all time, with about 200 million copies sold worldwide. A series of Karl May film adaptations was successful in the 1960s.

== Early life ==
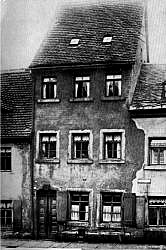
The family house then on Niedergasse 111, where Karl May was born in Hohenstein-Ernstthal. The house was inherited by May's mother in 1838 and sold in 1845 (photo 1910).

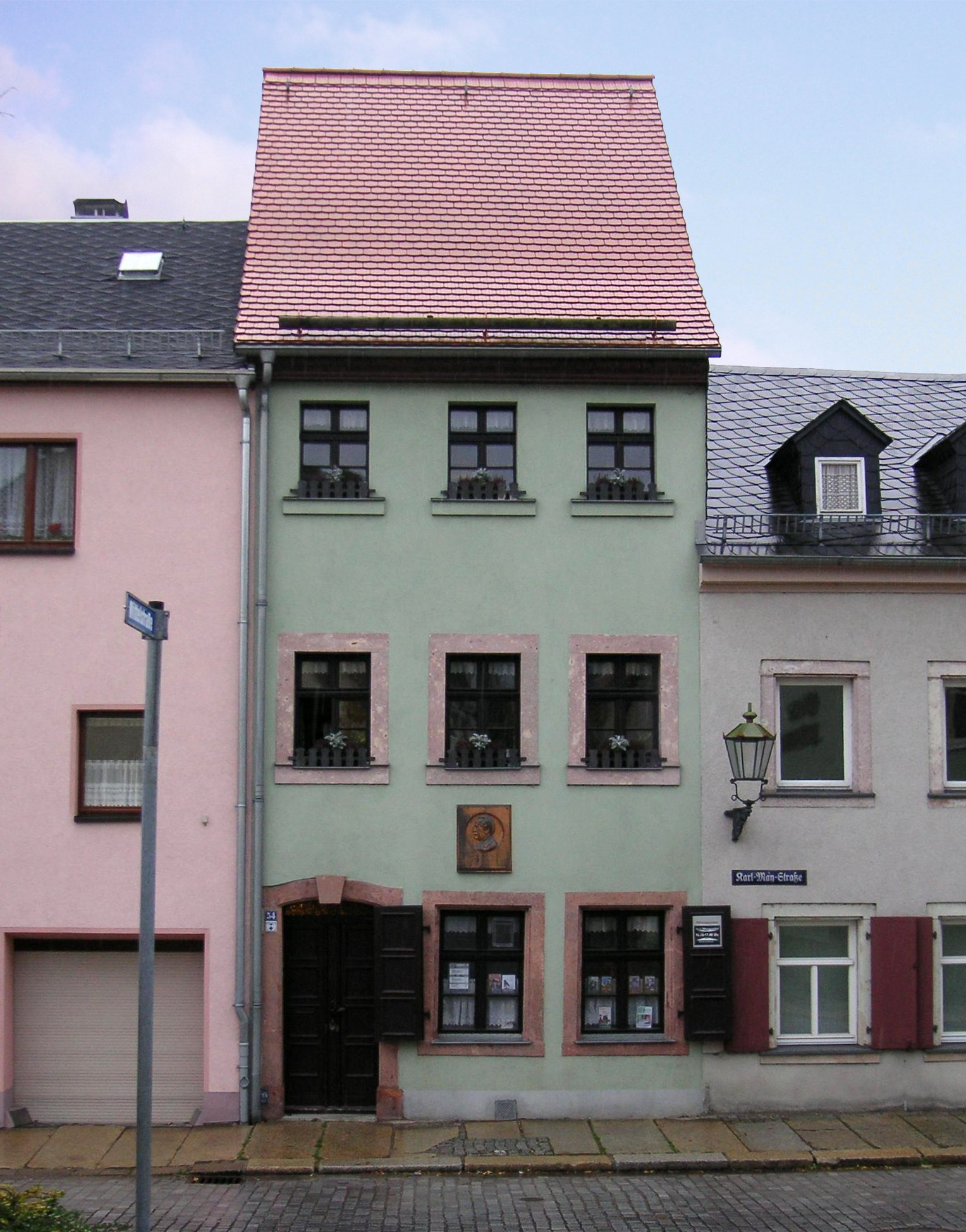
The house where Karl May was born is now located on Karl-May-Straße (photo 2005). The street was named in his honor. Next to the house is a modern Karl May depository, literary museum and research center that was established in July 2022.

May was the fifth child of a poor family of weavers in Ernstthal, Schönburgische Rezessherrschaften (then part of the Kingdom of Saxony). He had 13 siblings, of whom nine died in infancy. His parents were Heinrich August May and Wilhelmine Christiane Weise. During his school years, he received instruction in music and composition. At age twelve, May was making money at a skittle alley, where he was exposed to rough language.

=== Delinquency ===
In 1856, May commenced teacher training in Waldenburg, but in 1859 was expelled for stealing six candles. After an appeal, he was allowed to continue in Plauen. Shortly after graduation, when his roommate accused him of stealing a watch, May was jailed in Chemnitz for six weeks and his license to teach was revoked. After this, May worked with little success as a private tutor, an author of tales, a composer and a public speaker. For four years, from 1865 to 1869, May was jailed in the workhouse at Osterstein Castle, Zwickau. With good behaviour, May became an administrator of the prison library, which gave him the chance to read widely. He made a list of the works he planned to write (Repertorium C. May.)

On his release, May continued his life of crime, impersonating various characters (policemen, doctors etc.) and spinning fantastic tales as a method of fraud. He was arrested, but when he was transported to a crime scene during a judicial investigation, he escaped and fled to Bohemia, where he was detained for vagrancy. For another four years, from 1870 to 1874, May was jailed in Waldheim, Saxony. There he met a Catholic Catechist, Johannes Kochta, who assisted May.

== Career ==
After his release in May 1874, May returned to his parents' home in Ernstthal and began to write. In November 1874, Die Rose von Ernstthal ("The Rose from Ernstthal") was published. May then became an editor in the publishing house of Heinrich Gotthold Münchmeyer in Dresden, where he managed entertainment papers such as Schacht und Hütte ("Mine and Mill") and continued to publish his own works such as Geographische Predigten ("Collected Travel Stories") (1876). May resigned in 1876 and was employed by Bruno Radelli of Dresden.

In 1878, May became a freelance writer. Once again, May was insolvent. In 1882, May returned to the employ of Münchmeyer and began the first of five large colportage novels. One of these was Das Waldröschen (1882–1884). From 1879, May was also published in Deutscher Hausschatz ("German House Treasure"), a Catholic weekly journal from the press of Friedrich Pustet in Regensburg. In 1880, May began the Orient Cycle, which ran, with interruption, until 1888.

May was also published in the teenage boys' journal Der Gute Kamerad ("The Good Comrade") of Wilhelm Spemann, Stuttgart. In 1887, it published Der Sohn des Bärenjägers ("Son of the Bear Hunter"). In 1891 Der Schatz im Silbersee ("The Treasure of Silver Lake") was published. May published in other journals using pseudonyms. In all, he published over one hundred articles. In October 1888, May moved to Kötzschenbroda (a part of Radebeul) and in 1891 to Villa Agnes in Oberlößnitz. In 1891, Friedrich Ernst Fehsenfeld offered to print the Deutscher Hausschatz "Son of the Bear Hunter" stories as books.

In 1892, the publication of Carl May's Gesammelte Reiseromane (Collected Travel Accounts or Karl May's Gesammelte Reiseerzählungen) brought financial security and recognition. May became deeply absorbed in the stories he wrote and the lives of his characters. Readers wrote to May, addressing him as the protagonists of his books. May conducted talking tours in Germany and Austria and allowed autographed cards to be printed and photos in costume to be taken. In December 1895, May moved to the Villa Shatterhand in Alt-Radebeul, which he purchased from the Ziller brothers.

=== Later career ===
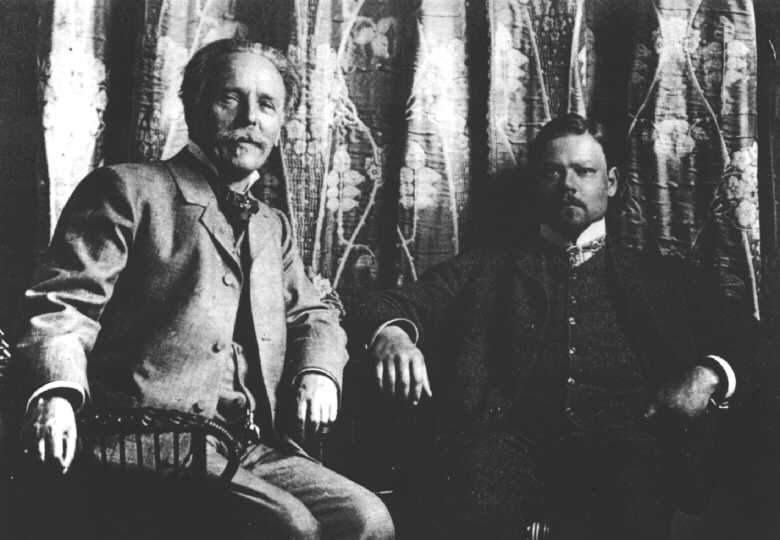
May and Sascha Schneider, 1904

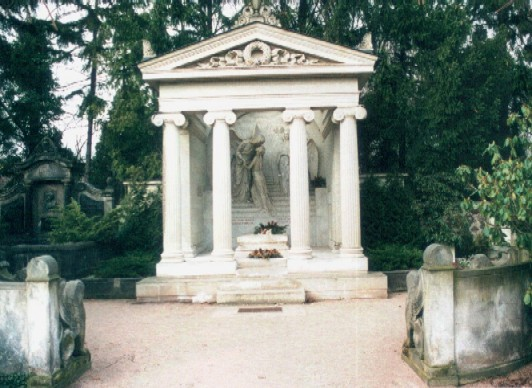
The tomb of Karl and Klara May

In 1899, May traveled to Egypt then Sumatra with his servant, Sejd Hassan. In 1900, he was joined by Klara and Richard Plöhn. The group returned to Radebeul in July 1900. May demonstrated some emotional instability during his travels.

Hermann Cardauns and Rudolf Lebius criticised May for his self-promotion with the Old Shatterhand legend. He was also reproached for his writing for the Catholic Deutscher Hausschatz and several Marian calendars. There were also charges of unauthorised book publications and the use of an illegal doctoral degree.

In 1902, May received a Doctor honoris causa from the Universitas Germana-Americana in Chicago for Im Reiche des Silbernen Löwen ("In the Realm of the Silver Lion."). In 1908, Karl and Klara May spent six weeks in North America. They traveled through Albany, New York, Buffalo, New York, the Niagara Falls and visited friends in Lawrence, Massachusetts. May was inspired to write Winnetou IV.

On his return, May began work on complex allegorical texts. He considered the "question of mankind", pacifism and the raising of humans from evil to good. Sascha Schneider provided symbolist covers for the Fehsenfeld edition. On 22 March 1912, May was invited by the Academic Society for Literature and Music in Vienna to present a lecture entitled Empor ins Reich der Edelmenschen ("Upward to the Realm of Noble Men"). There, he met pacifist and Nobel Laureate Bertha von Suttner.

== Death ==
May died in his own Villa Shatterhand on 30 March 1912. According to the register of deaths, the cause was cardiac arrest, acute bronchitis and asthma, but according to Ralf Harder from the Karl-May-Stiftung, May's death certificate does not include the cause of death.

Scientists examining the remains of May in 2014 found excessive quantities of lead and other heavy metals, and concluded that his death was probably due to a long-time exposure to lead in water and tobacco. May was buried in Radebeul East. His tomb was inspired by the Temple of Athena Nike.

== Personal life ==
On 17 August 1880, May married Emma Lina Pollmer. They divorced in 1903 and had no children. May subsequently married Klara Bleibler Plöhn, who was widowed.

== Works ==
May used many pseudonyms, including "Capitan Ramon Diaz de la Escosura", "D. Jam", "Emma Pollmer", "Ernst von Linden", "Hobble-Frank", "Karl Hohenthal", "M. Gisela", "P. van der Löwen", "Prinz Muhamel Lautréamont" and "Richard Plöhn". Most pseudonymously or anonymously published works have been identified.

For the novels set in America, May created the characters of Winnetou, the wise chief of the Apaches, and Old Shatterhand, Winnetou's white blood brother. Another series of novels were set in the Ottoman Empire. In these, the narrator-protagonist, Kara Ben Nemsi, travels with his local guide and servant Hadschi Halef Omar through the Sahara desert to the Near East, experiencing many exciting adventures.

May's writing developed from the anonymous first-person observer-narrator (for example Der Gitano, 1875) to a narrator with heroic skills and equipment, to a fully formed first-person narrator-hero.

With few exceptions, May had not visited the places he described, but he compensated successfully for his lack of direct experience through a combination of creativity, imagination, and documentary sources including maps, travel accounts and guidebooks, as well as anthropological and linguistic studies. The work of writers such as James Fenimore Cooper, Gabriel Ferry, Friedrich Gerstäcker, Balduin Möllhausen and Mayne Reid served as his models.

Non-dogmatic Christian values play an important role in May's works. Some of the characters are described as being of German, particularly Saxon, origins.

In a letter to a young Jew who intended to become a Christian after reading May's books, May advised him first to understand his own religion, which he described as holy and exalted, until he was experienced enough to choose.

In his later works (after 1900) May left the adventure fiction genre to write symbolic novels with religious and pacifistic content. The change is best shown in Im Reiche des silbernen Löwen, where the first two parts are adventurous and the last two parts belong to the mature work.

=== Early work ===
In his early work, May wrote in a variety of genres until he showed his proficiency in travel stories. During his time as an editor, he published many of these works within the periodicals for which he was responsible.

- Das Buch der Liebe (1876, educational work)
- Geographische Predigten (1876, educational work)
- Der beiden Quitzows letzte Fahrten (1877, unfinished)
- Auf hoher See gefangen (Auf der See gefangen, parts later revised for Old Surehand II) (1878)
- Scepter und Hammer (1880)
- Im fernen Westen (reworked in Old Firehand (1875) and later in Winnetou II)(1879)
- Der Waldläufer (reworked in "Le Coureur de Bois", a novel by Gabriel Ferry)
- Die Juweleninsel (1882)

The shorter stories of the early work can be grouped as follows, although in some works genres overlap. Some of the shorter stories were later published in anthologies, for example, Der Karawanenwürger und andere Erzählungen (1894), Humoresken und Erzählungen (1902) and Erzgebirgische Dorfgeschichten (1903).

- Adventure fiction and early travel stories (for example, Inn-nu-woh, der Indianerhäuptling, 1875)
- Crime fiction (for example, Wanda, 1875)
- Historical fiction (for example, Robert Surcouf, 1882)
- Humorous stories (for example, Die Fastnachtsnarren, 1875)
- Series about "the Old Dessauer", Leopold I, Prince of Anhalt-Dessau (for example, Pandur und Grenadier, 1883)
- Stories of villages in the Ore Mountains (for example, Die Rose von Ernstthal, 1874 or 1875)
- Natural history works (for example, Schätze und Schatzgräber, 1875)
- Letters and poems (for example, Meine einstige Grabinschrift, 1872).

=== Colportage novels ===
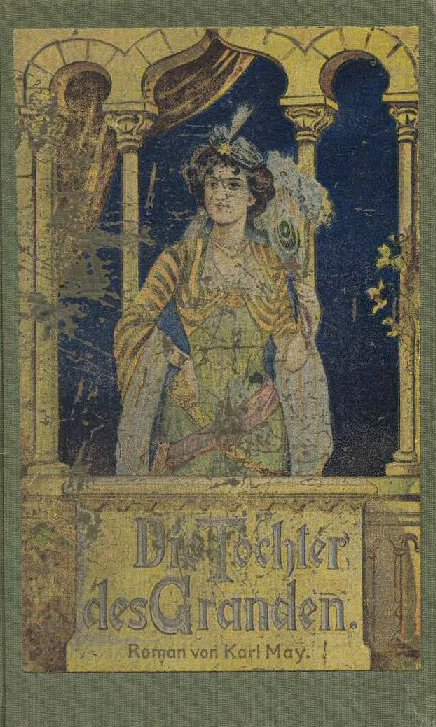
The cover for Waldröschen

May wrote five large (many thousands of pages) colportage novels, which he published either anonymously or under pseudonyms between 1882 and 1888.

- Das Waldröschen (1882–1884, a part was later revised for Old Surehand II)
- Die Liebe des Ulanen (1883–1885)
- Der verlorne Sohn oder Der Fürst des Elends (1884–1886)
- Deutsche Herzen (Deutsche Helden) (1885–1888)
- Der Weg zum Glück (1886–1888)

From 1900 to 1906, Münchmeyer's successor Adalbert Fischer published the first book editions. These were revised by third hand and published under May's real name instead of pseudonyms. This edition was not authorized by May and he tried to stop its publication.

=== Travel stories ===
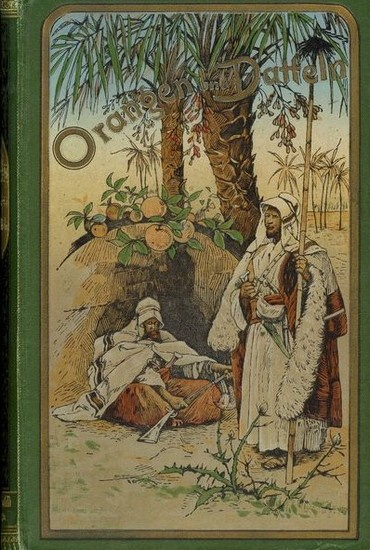
The cover of Orangen und Datteln by Fritz Bergen (1893)

Thirty-three volumes of Carl May's Gesammelte Reiseromane, (Karl May's Gesammelte Reiseerzählungen) were published from 1892 to 1910 by Friedrich Ernst Fehsenfeld. Most had been previously published in Deutscher Hausschatz, but some were new. The best known titles are the Orient Cycle (volumes 1–6) and the Winnetou-Trilogy (volumes 7–9). Beyond these shorter cycles, the works are troubled by chronological inconsistencies arising when original articles were revised for book editions.

1. Durch Wüste und Harem (1892, since 1895 titled Durch die Wüste) (translated as "In the Desert")
2. Durchs wilde Kurdistan (1892)
3. Von Bagdad nach Stambul (1892)
4. In den Schluchten des Balkan (1892)
5. Durch das Land der Skipetaren (1892)
6. Der Schut (1892)
7. Winnetou I (1893, also titled Winnetou der Rote Gentleman I)
8. Winnetou II (1893, also titled Winnetou der Rote Gentleman II)
9. Winnetou III (1893, also titled Winnetou der Rote Gentleman III)
10. Orangen und Datteln (1893, an anthology)
11. Am Stillen Ocean (1894, an anthology)
12. Am Rio de la Plata (1894)
13. In den Cordilleren (1894)
14. Old Surehand I (1894)
15. Old Surehand II (1895)
16. Im Lande des Mahdi I (1896)
17. Im Lande des Mahdi II (1896)
18. Im Lande des Mahdi III (1896)
19. Old Surehand III (1897)
20. Satan und Ischariot I (1896)
21. Satan und Ischariot II (1897)
22. Satan und Ischariot III (1897)
23. Auf fremden Pfaden (1897, an anthology)
24. Weihnacht! (1897)

26. Im Reiche des silbernen Löwen I (1898)
27. Im Reiche des silbernen Löwen II (1898)
25. Am Jenseits (1899)

May's oeuvre includes some shorter travel stories that were not published within this series (for example, Eine Befreiung in Die Rose von Kaïrwan, 1894). After the founding of the Karl May Press in 1913, works in Gesammelte Werke were revised (sometimes extensively) and many received new titles. Texts (other than those from Fehsenfeld Press) were also added to the new series.

=== Stories for young readers ===
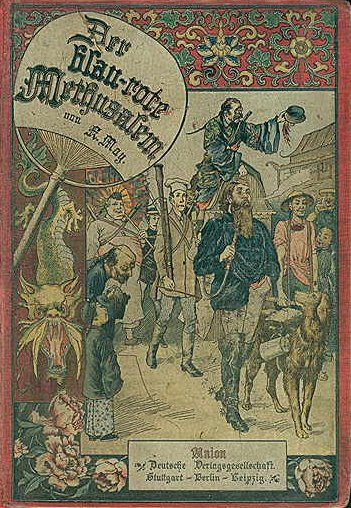
The cover of Der blaurote Methusalem by Oskar Herrfurth

These stories were written from 1887 to 1897 for the magazine Der Gute Kamerad. Most of the stories are set in the Wild West, but Old Shatterhand is just a figure and not the first-person narrator as he is in the travel stories. The best-known volume is Der Schatz im Silbersee. In the broadest sense, the early works Im fernen Westen and Der Waldläufer belong in this category.

- Der Sohn des Bärenjägers (1887, since 1890 within Die Helden des Westens)
- Der Geist des Llano estakata (1888, since 1890 correctly titled as Der Geist des Llano estakado within Die Helden des Westens)
- Kong-Kheou, das Ehrenwort (1888/89, since 1892 titled Der blaurote Methusalem)
- Die Sklavenkarawane (1890)
- Der Schatz im Silbersee (1891)
- Das Vermächtnis des Inka (1892)
- Der Oelprinz (1894, since 1905 titled as Der Ölprinz)
- Der schwarze Mustang (1897)
- Replies to letters from readers in Der Gute Kamerad.

=== Mature work ===
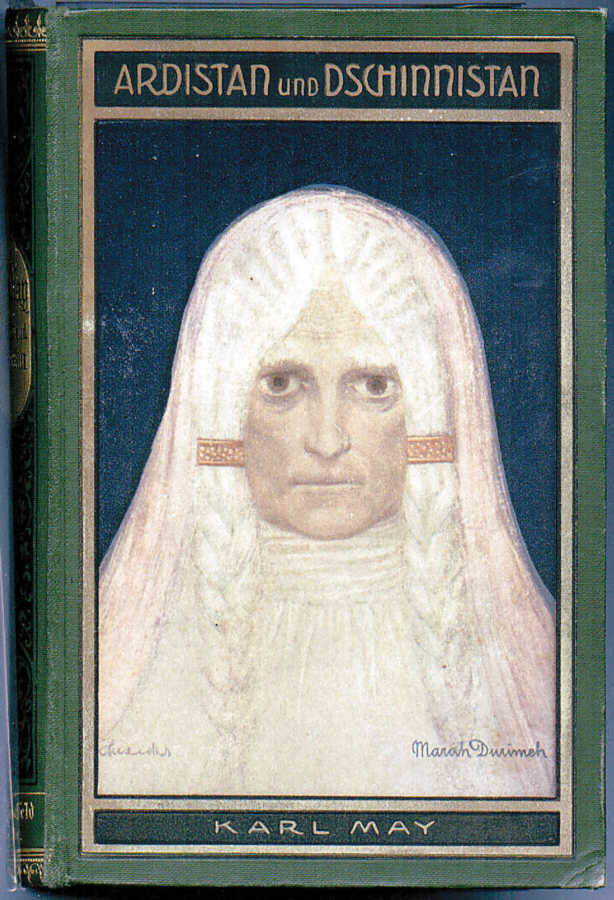
Ardistan und Dschinnistan, 1909, cover by Sascha Schneider showing Marah Durimeh

May's mature work dates to 1900, after his travels to the East. Many of them were published by Fehsenfeld.

- Himmelsgedanken (1900, poem collection)
- Im Reiche des silbernen Löwen III (1902)
- Erzgebirgische Dorfgeschichten (1903, anthology)
- Im Reiche des silbernen Löwen IV (1903)
- Und Friede auf Erden! (1904)
- Babel und Bibel (1906, drama)
- Ardistan und Dschinnistan I (1909)
- Ardistan und Dschinnistan II (1909)
- Winnetou IV (1910)
- Mein Leben und Streben (1910, autobiography)
- Schamah (1907) and other short stories.
- Briefe über Kunst (1907) and other articles.
- "Karl May als Erzieher" und "Die Wahrheit über Karl May" oder Die Gegner Karl Mays in ihrem eigenen Lichte (1902) and other legal proceedings.

=== Other works ===
May was a member of the "Lyra" choir in about 1864 and composed musical works, including a version of Ave Maria and Vergiss mich nicht within Ernste Klänge, 1899.

During his last years, May lectured on his philosophical ideas.

- Drei Menschheitsfragen: Wer sind wir? Woher kommen wir? Wohin gehen wir? (Lawrence, 1908)
- Sitara, das Land der Menschheitsseele (Augsburg, 1909)
- Empor ins Reich der Edelmenschen (Vienna, 1912)

Furthermore, there are posthumous publications of fragments of stories and dramas, lyrics, musical compositions, letters and the library catalog.

== Reception ==
=== Number of copies and translations ===
According to an encyclopedia dedicated to May, he is the "most read writer of the German tongue". The total number of copies published is about 200 million, half of them in German.

May's first translated work is considered to have been the first half of the Orient Cycle into a French daily newspaper in 1881. Hans Dieter Steinmet (of d Karl May Museum) said that Croatian writer Nikola Tordinac published a translation of May's novel Tree carde monte in the magazine Sriemski Hrvat in 1880. Tordinac's translation became a part of the permanent exhibition of the Karl May Museum in 2017. Since that time, May's work has been translated into more than 30 languages, including Latin and Esperanto. In the 1960s, UNESCO indicated that May was the most frequently translated German writer. His most popular translations are in Bulgarian, Czech, Hungarian and Dutch. Seabury Press, New York, began publishing English translations by Michael Shaw in 1977.

=== Influence ===
May had a substantial influence on a number of well-known German-speaking people and on the German population itself. The popularity of his writing, and his (generally German) protagonists, are seen as having filled a lack in the German psyche, which had few popular heroes until the 19th century. His readers longed to escape from an industrialised, capitalist society, an escape which May offered. May "helped shape the collective German dream of feats far beyond middle-class bounds." and contributed to the popular image of Native Americans in German-speaking countries, which has been described by many as racist and harmful.

The name Winnetou has an entry in the German dictionary, Duden. The wider influence on the populace also surprised US occupation troops after World War II, who realised that thanks to May, "Cowboys and Indians" were familiar concepts to local children (though fantastic and removed from reality).

Many well-known German-speaking people used May's heroes as models in their childhood. Albert Einstein enjoyed May's books and said, "My whole adolescence stood under his sign. Indeed, even today, he has been dear to me in many a desperate hour..."

==== Racism and cultural appropriation ====
May has been criticised for reproducing racial stereotypes and of cultural appropriation in his depiction of Winnetou and other characters in his books.

In 2018, Red Haircrow, a German-born Native (Chiricahua Apache/Cherokee) and African American, produced a film Forget Winnetou that explored the impact of the Winnetou books on reinforcing Native American stereotypes, racism and colonialism, and how this still impacts Indigenous people today.

In August 2025, Survival International, an NGO that campaigns for global Indigenous rights, launched a campaign Escaping Winnetou that challenged the racist stereotypes about Indigenous people that feature in May’s books.

==== Influence on the Nazis ====
Adolf Hitler was an admirer of May's writings. He noted that the novels "overwhelmed" him as a boy, going as far as to ensure "a noticeable decline" in his school grades. In his adult life, Hitler had a shelf of honor built in his library to hold his precious collection of works by May, which were specially bound in vellum.

According to an anonymous acquaintance at the men's hostel, Hitler attended the lecture given by May in Vienna in March 1912 and was enthusiastic about the event. The lecture, titled "And Peace on Earth," was an appeal for peace, also heard by Nobel Peace Prize laureate Bertha von Suttner. May died suddenly only ten days after the lecture, leaving the young Hitler deeply upset. Claus Roxin noted that he doubts the anonymous description, because Hitler had said much about May, but not that he had seen him.

Hitler defended May against critics in the men's hostel where he lived in Vienna, as the evidence of May's earlier time in jail had come to light. Although it was true, Hitler conceded, that May had never visited the sites of his American adventure stories. This made him a greater writer in Hitler's view since it showed the author's powers of imagination.

Hitler later recommended the books to his generals and had special editions distributed to soldiers at the front, praising Winnetou as an example of "tactical finesse and circumspection", though some note that the latter claims of using the books as military guidance are not substantiated. However, as told by Albert Speer, "when faced by seemingly hopeless situations, he [Hitler] would still reach for these stories," because "they gave him courage like works of philosophy for others or the Bible for elderly people."

Hitler's admiration for May led the German writer Klaus Mann to accuse May of having been a form of "mentor" for Hitler. In his admiration, Hitler ignored May's Christian and humanitarian approach and views completely. The National Socialists in particular tried to use May's popularity and his work for their purposes.

==== Indianertümelei ====
The popularity of May's books sparked a fascination in German popular culture with the Indigenous peoples of North America that continues to this day. In 1985, the German scholar Hartmut Lutz invented the term Deutsche Indianertümelei ("German Indian Enthusiasm") for the phenomenon. The phrase Indianertümelei is a reference to the German term Deutschtümelei ("German Enthusiasm") which mockingly describes the phenomenon of celebrating in an excessively nationalistic and romanticized manner Deutschtum ("Germanness"). In the English-speaking world, the phenomenon of the German obsession with the First Nations of North America is known as "Indianthusiasm". In a 1999 speech delivered in the United States in English, Lutz declared:

For over two hundred years Germans have found Indianer so fascinating that even today an Indian iconography is used in advertising. The most popular image of the Indianer is provided by Karl May's fictional Apache chief Winnetou...Indian lore is profitable and marketable, as some Native Americans travelling in Germany may attest...There is a marked Indian presence in German everyday culture, even down to the linguistic level, where sentences like ein Indianer weint nicht (an Indian doesn't cry), ein Indianer kennt keinen Schmerz (an Indian braves pain) or figures such as der letzte Mohikaner (the Last of the Mohicans) have become part of the everyday speech.

As part of the phenomenon of Indianertümelei a number of Western and Indian theme parks operate in Germany, the most popular of which are the Pullman City theme park outside of Munich and El Dorado theme park outside of Berlin. May's books also inspired hobbyist clubs, where Germans pretend to be cowboys or Indians, the first of which was the Cowboy Club founded in Munich in 1913. In 2019, it was estimated that between 40,000 and 100,000 Germans are involved in Indianer hobbyist clubs at any given moment.

Interviewed in 2007, one member of an Indianer club stated: "Our camp is always in summer, in July for two weeks. During this time, we live in tipis, we wear only Indian clothes. We don't use technology and we try to follow Indian traditions. We have those [pretending to be] Lakota, Oglala, Blackfeet, Blood, Siksika, Pawneee... and we go on the warpath against each other day and night, anytime at all. In two weeks, every tribe can fight each other. We don't know when somebody will attack or when they will come to steal our horses. And the battles are always exciting, too. I really enjoy them".

Regarding the role of Karl May's works, Karl May movies and Karl May stage adaptations for the German image of Native Americans, Rivka Galchen notes in her essay on "Wild West Germany" in 2012:

As Americans, we tend to find the German infatuation with Native Americans campy and naïve. But the comfort of Karl May fans with May’s historical inaccuracies surely comes in part from their confident knowledge of the actual history. Whereas we know almost nothing. We do not proclaim our innocence; we do not feel we are on trial.

==== Influence on other authors ====
The German writer Carl Zuckmayer was intrigued by May's Apache chief and named his daughter Maria Winnetou. Max von der Grün said he read May as a young boy. When asked whether reading May's books had given him anything, he answered, "No. It took something away from me. The fear of bulky books, that is." Heinz Werner Höber, the twofold Glauser prize winner, was a follower of May. He said, "When I was about 12 years old I wrote my first novel on Native Americans which was, of course, from the beginning to the end completely stolen from Karl May." He had pleaded with friends to get him to Radebeul "because Radebeul meant Karl May". There, he was deeply impressed by the museum and said, "My great fellow countryman from Hohenstein-Ernstthal and his immortal heroes have never left me ever since."

=== Honors ===
Asteroids 348 May and 15728 Karlmay are named in May's honour.

== Adaptations ==
May's poem Ave Maria (1896) was set to music in at least 19 versions. Other poems, especially from the collection Himmelsgedanken were also set to music. Carl Ball wrote Harp Clangs for the drama Babel und Bibel for May. The Swiss composer Othmar Schoeck adapted Der Schatz im Silbersee for opera. May's concepts, such as Winnetou's death, inspired musical works.

The first stage adaptation of May's work was Winnetou (1919) by Hermann Dimmler. Dimmler and Ludwig Körner made revised editions of the play. Different novel revisions have been played on outdoor stages since the 1940s. The Karl May Festival in Bad Segeberg has been held every summer since 1952 and in Lennestadt-Elspe since 1958. At some of these festivals, Pierre Brice has played Winnetou. Another festival has been conducted on a rock stage in Rathen, in Saxon Switzerland near Radebeul in 1940 and then since 1984.

In 1920, May's friend Marie Luise Droop, her husband Adolf Droop and the Karl May Press founded Ustad-Film, a production company. Ustad-Film made three silent movies (Auf den Trümmern des Paradieses, Die Todeskarawane and Die Teufelsanbeter) after the Orientcycle. The company became bankrupt in 1921 and the films are lost. In 1936 a first sound movie Durch die Wüste was shown. Die Sklavenkarawane (1958) and its sequel Der Löwe von Babylon (1959) were the first colour movies.

From 1962 to 1968, a series of May movies were made. While most of the seventeen movies of this series were Wild West movies (beginning with Der Schatz im Silbersee), three were based on the Orientcycle and two on Das Waldröschen. Most of these movies were made separately by the two competitors Horst Wendlandt and Artur Brauner. Several actors were employed, including Lex Barker (Old Shatterhand, Kara Ben Nemsi, Karl Sternau), Pierre Brice (Winnetou), Gojko Mitić (Winnetou), Stewart Granger (Old Surehand), Milan Srdoč (Old Wabble) and Ralf Wolter (Sam Hawkens, Hadschi Halef Omar, André Hasenpfeffer). The film score by Martin Böttcher and the landscape of Yugoslavia are associated with the movies. Other movies such as Die Spur führt zum Silbersee (1990) and TV productions such as Das Buschgespenst (1986) and the television series Kara Ben Nemsi Effendi (1973) were produced. The productions vary from the original written works.

In 2016, German RTL Television premiered three-part television movies based on Winnetou, directed by Philipp Stölzl. In the part "Winnetou and Old Shatterhand", Gojko Mitić, one of the actors who played Winnetou in the '60s movies, portrayed Intschu Tschuna, Winnetou's father.

May's works (about 300) have been adapted for audio dramas, particularly in the 1960s. The first, Der Schatz im Silbersee, was written by Günther Bibo in 1929. There are also Czech and Danish versions of the audio dramas. In 1988, Der Schatz im Silbersee was read by Gert Westphal and published as an audiobook. Wann sehe ich dich wieder, du lieber, lieber Winnetou? (1995) is a compendium of Karl May texts read by Hermann Wiedenroth.

In the 1950s Croatian comic book artist Walter Neugebauer finished his 1930s comic book adaptation of Karl May's stories. Serbian artist Aleksandar Hecl also drew one. In the 1960s and 1970s, May's works were adapted for German comics including an eight-issue series based on Winnetou and a further nine-issue series titled Karl May (1963–1965). The series was drawn by Helmut Nickel and Harry Ehrt and published by Walter Lehning Verlag. Belgian comics artist Willy Vandersteen created a whole series of comics based on May's stories, simply titled Karl May (1962–1977). Eighty-seven issues of Karl May were published by Standaard Uitgeverij from 1962 to 1987. Comics based on May's novels were also produced in Czechoslovakia, Denmark, France, Mexico, Spain and Sweden.

May's life has been the subject of screen works, novels and a stage play, including

- Freispruch für Old Shatterhand (1965, directed by Hans Heinrich)
- Karl May (1974, directed by Hans-Jürgen Syberberg)
- Karl May (1992, directed by. Klaus Überall, a television series in 8 episodes)
- Swallow, mein wackerer Mustang (1980) by Erich Loest
- Vom Wunsch, Indianer zu werden. Wie Franz Kafka Karl May traf und trotzdem nicht in Amerika landete (1994) by Peter Henisch
- Old Shatterhand in Moabit (1994) by Walter Püschel
- Karl May und der Wettermacher (2001) by Jürgen Heinzerling
- Die Taschenuhr des Anderen by Willi Olbrich.

=== Copies, parodies, and sequels ===
May was copied or parodied during his lifetime. Some wrote similar Wild West stories. Others, such as Franz Treller, published under May's name. Novelizations of May's characters include

- Hadschi Halef Omar (2010) Jörg Kastner describes the first contact of the titular character with Kara Ben Nemsi.
- In Mekka (1923) Franz Kandolf, a sequel to Am Jenseits (Karl May's Gesammelte Werke volume 50).
- "Die Schatten des Schah-in-Schah" (2006) Heinz Grill, an alternative to Im Reiche des silbernen Löwen III/IV.
- Winnetous Testament Jutta Laroche and Reinhard Marheinecke, a series of eight volumes as a sequel to Winnetou IV.
- Der Schuh des Manitu (2001) Michael Herbig, a parody on the Karl May films of the 1960s.

== Karl May institutions ==
=== Karl May Foundation ===
In his will, May made his second wife, Klara, his sole heiress. He instructed that after her death all of his property and any future earnings from his work should go to a foundation. This foundation should support the education of the gifted poor including writers, journalists, and editors. One year after May's death, on 5 March 1913, Klara May established the "Karl May Foundation" ("Karl-May-Stiftung"). Contributions have been made since 1917. Klara and Karl May's estate went to the foundation. The foundation established the Karl May Museum to maintain the Villa Shatterhand, the estates, the collections and May's tomb. In 1960, the Karl May Foundation received the Karl May Press.

=== Karl May Press ===
On 1 July 1913, Klara May, Friedrich Ernst Fehsenfeld (May's main publisher) and the jurist Euchar Albrecht Schmid established the "Foundation Press Fehsenfeld & Co." ("Stiftungs-Verlag Fehsenfeld & Co.") in Radebeul. In 1915, the name changed to "Karl May Press" ("Karl-May-Verlag" (KMV)). The KMV consolidated the rights to May's works from internal discord and from other publishers. Third-hand revisions of these texts were added to the series Karl May's Gesammelte Reiseerzählungen, which was renamed to Karl May's Gesammelte Werke (und Briefe). The existing 33 volumes of the original series were also revised, some extensively. By 1945 there were 65 volumes. The press is exclusive to May's work and subsidiary literature. Besides the Gesammelte Werke (the classical "green volumes"), which have 91 volumes today, the press has a huge reprint programme.

The Karl May Press aims to rehabilitate May from literary criticism and to support the Karl May Foundation. In 1921, Fehsenfeld left and in 1960, the foundation fell to Klara May's estate, and thus the Press is owned by the Schmid family. In 1959, due to censorship in the Soviet occupation zone and East Germany, the Press moved to Bamberg (Germany). In 1963, when copyright ended, the Press began commercialising May's works. After German reunification, in 1996, the Press took a second office in Radebeul. The name "Karl May" is a registered trade mark of the "Karl May Verwaltungs- und Vertriebs-GmbH", which belongs to the Karl May Press.

=== Museums ===
==== Radebeul ====
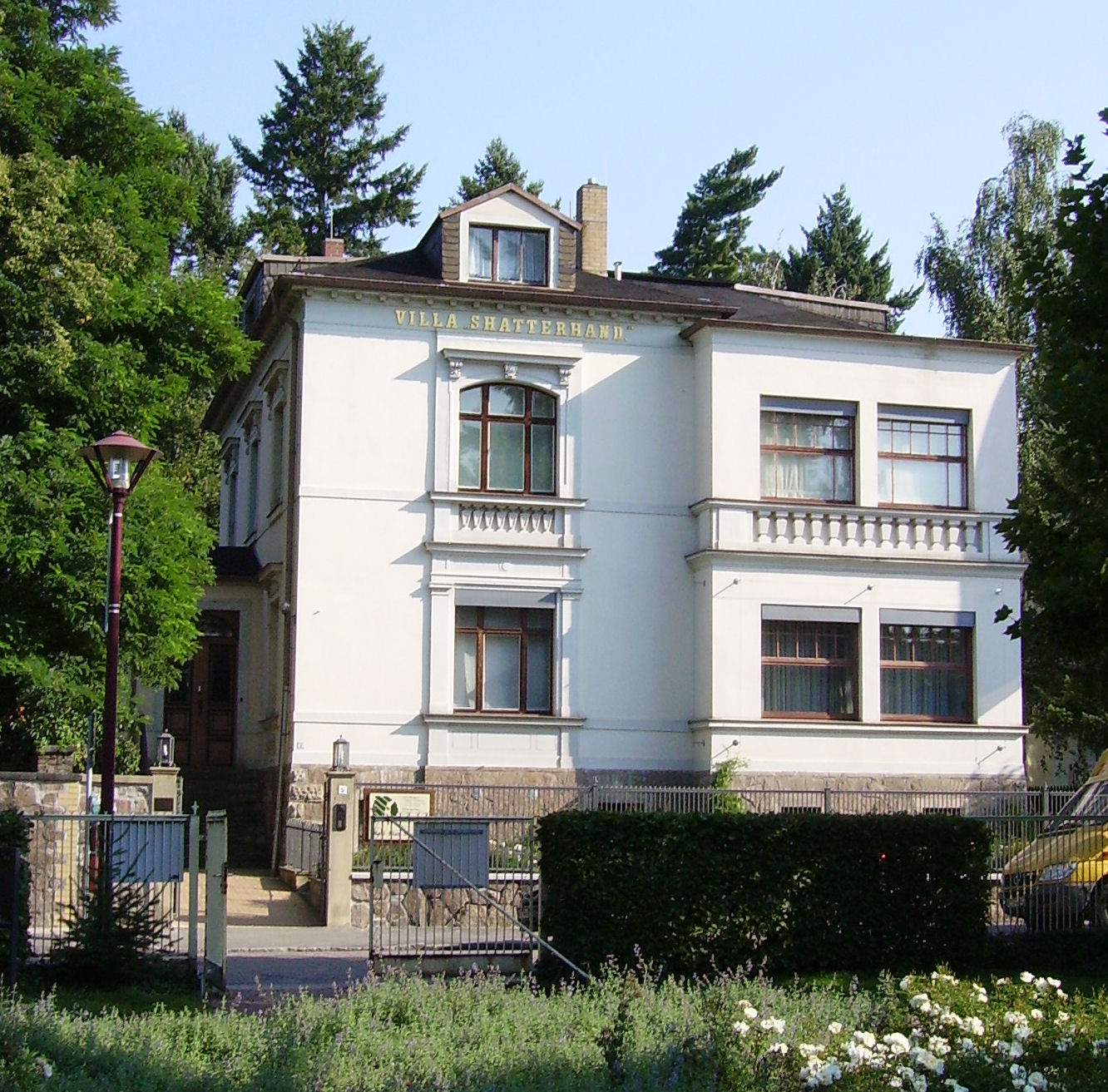
May's Villa Shatterhand

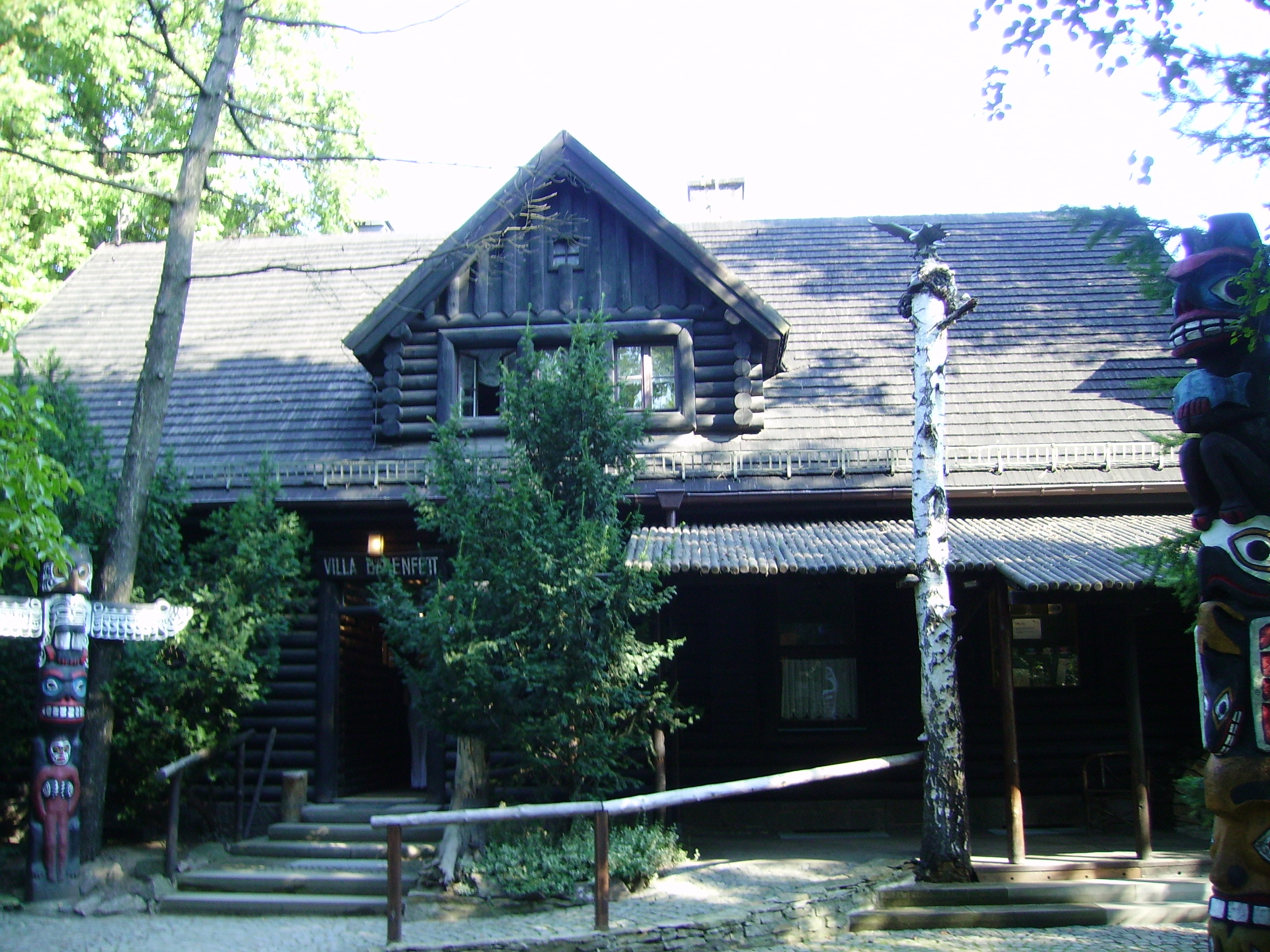
Villa Bärenfett

The Karl May Museum is in the Villa Shatterhand in Radebeul and contains artifacts from May's life as well as from life on the American frontier and Native American life of that era. It was founded in 1928 by May's widow and an eccentric Austrian named Ernst Tobis. When the Nazis took over Germany, they appropriated the museum and the image of May, and were especially focused on swastikas that appeared in some of the Native American artwork. Hitler Youth were encouraged to visit the museum and hear stories from Tobis.

After World War II, the original museum remained in East Germany and a replica was built in Bamberg in West Germany. From 1956 to 1984, the museum in Radebeul was called the "Indianer Museum", because May's books were suppressed by the East German government; its original name was restored in 1986.

Around 2010, controversy arose over scalps, some of them from Native Americans, that were in the museum's collection. In 2014, Sault Sainte Marie Tribe of Chippewa Indians from Michigan (USA) asked the museum to return remains of their ancestors that were on display there. Initially the museum agreed to remove the items from display but refused to return them claiming it had not been proven which tribe the scalps came from. In 2020, the museum finally agreed to return a scalp, six years after the Chippewa first complained.

==== Hohenstein-Ernstthal ====
The "Karl May House" ("Karl-May-Haus") is the three-centuries-old weaver house where May was born. Since 12 March 1985, it has been a memorial and museum. It shows an original weaving room and non-German book editions. The garden has been arranged according to May's description in his memoirs.

Opposite the house is the International Karl May Heritage Center ("Karl-May-Begegnungsstätte"), which is used for events and special exhibitions. In Hohenstein-Ernstthal, called "Karl May Home Town" since 1992, every May-related place has a commemorative plaque. These places are connected by a "Karl May Path" ("Karl-May-Wanderweg"). Outside the city lies the "Karl May Cave" ("Karl-May-Höhle"), where May found shelter during his criminal times.

=== Societies ===
In the 1890s, there were Karl May clubs. Today, various entities focus on research about the author. These organisations exist in German-speaking regions, the Netherlands, Australia and Indonesia. While such societies are responsible for the release of most May-related periodicals, for example, Der Beobachter an der Elbe, Karl-May-Haus Information, Wiener Karl-May-Brief, and Karl May in Leipzig, the magazine Karl May & Co. is published independently.

The "Karl May Society" (KMG), founded on 22 March 1969, is the largest organisation, with approximately 1800 members. The KMG publishes Jahrbuch, Mitteilungen, Sonderhefte der Karl-May-Gesellschaft, and KMG-Nachrichten and reprints. Since 2008 and in cooperation with the Karl May Foundation and the Karl May Press, the KMG has published the critiqued edition of "Karl Mays Werke". This project was initiated by Hans Wollschläger and Hermann Wiedenroth in 1987.
