= Kara Ben Nemsi =

Kara Ben Nemsi قره بن نمسي
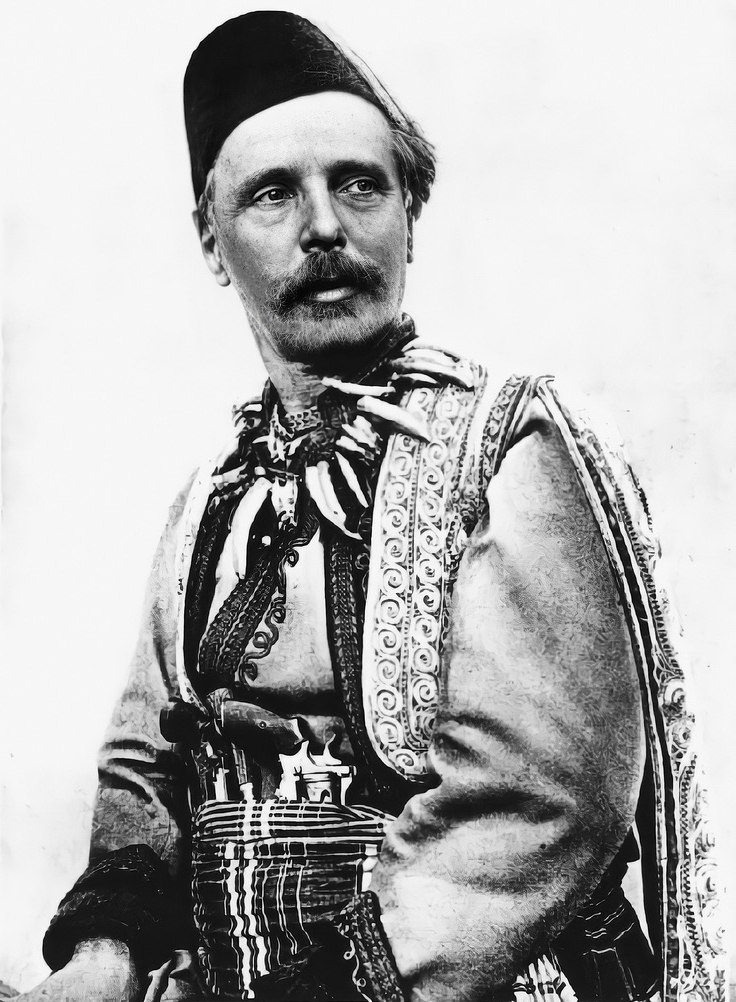
- First appearance: Giölgeda padiśhanün (1881)
- Last appearance: Ardistan und Dschinnistan II (1909)
- Created by: Karl May

In-universe information
- Gender: Male
- Nationality: German

Kara Ben Nemsi is a fictional main character from the works of Karl May, best-selling 19th century German author. An alter ego of May, the stories about Nemsi are written as first-person narratives. He travels across North Africa, Sudan, and the Ottoman Empire including various parts of the Middle East and the Balkans with his friend and servant Hadschi Halef Omar.

Nemsi shares his two famous rifles with Old Shatterhand, another fictional alter ego of May, the Bärentöter (Bear Killer) and the Henrystutzen (Henry Carbine). He rides the famed black horse Rih (from Arabic رِيح rīḥ meaning "wind").

== Old Shatterhand ==
Kara Ben Nemsi and Old Shatterhand, who undertakes similar adventures in North America, are one and the same person, created through Karl May's first person narration and autobiographical influences. This becomes obvious in the novel Im Reiche des silbernen Löwen I (In the Realm of the Silver Lion, Volume I) where the narrator going by Old Shatterhand is located in the US and meets an acquaintance of his from the Orient to whom he reveals himself as "Kara Ben Nemsi". In another novel Satan und Ischariot II (Satan and Iscariot, Volume II), wherein Old Shatterhand travels to Tunis he also reveals himself to be Kara Ben Nemsi.

== Origins and Meaning of the Name ==
May first introduces the terms "Nemsi“ and "Nemsistan“ in his third story set in the Orient Die Rose von Sokna (The Rose of Sokna) published in 1878. There he translates the terms used by a caravanner or rather by the Arab servant of the yet unnamed first-person narrator as "German" and "Germany" respectively. The name Kara Ben Nemsi first occurs in „Reise-Erinnerungen aus dem Türkenreiche von Karl May“ Giölgeda padiśhanün ("Travel-Memoirs from the Empire of Turks by Karl May" in the Shadow of the Padishah) later called Durch die Wüste (Through the desert) published in 1880/81 where it is spontaneously made up by servant Hadschi Halef Omar during an introduction:

"This steadfast fellow had once asked my name and had truly remembered the word Karl, but being unable to pronounce it, he has quickly converted it to Kara and added Ben Nemsi, ‘offspring of the Germans’." –GIÖLGEDA PADIŚHANÜN, 1880/81

In a later part of the story where May uses "Nemtsche-schimakler" ("Northern Germans, Prussia") and Nemtsche-memleketler ("Austrians") it becomes evident that May associates the terms "Nemsi" and "German" with a German state in the sense of the German Confederation instead of with the young German Empire in which he publishes these stories.

“The most courageous man was the ‘Sultan el Kebihr’, but still he was vanquished by the Nemtshe-shimakler (Northern Germans, Prussia), the Nemtshe-memleketler (Austrians) and the Moskowler (Russians). Why do you look at me so intently?” –GIÖLGEDA PADIŚHANÜN, 1880/81

When not taking about the name and in his later works May likes to use "Almani" and "Belad el Alman/Almanja" in his stories set in the Orient to mean 'German' and 'Germany' respectively:

"The land is called Belad el Alman; therefore I am an Almani or, in case you have heard of that term, a Nemsi and am called Kara Ben Nemsi. My fatherland is located far across the sea." – KRÜGER BEI, 1894/95

Belad el Alman ("Land of Germans“) is also directly associated with Kaiser Wilhelm I and therefore the German Empire:

"I have heard of the Belad el Alman. It is ruled by a great sultan, who is called Wi-hel (Wilhelm) and has defeated the French. They are our enemies; therefore every Almani is a friend of ours and my people will be delighted to see you. Of course you're also a warrior?" – EINE BEFREIUNG (A Liberation), 1894

The Ottoman Turkish نمچه nemçe (rendered nemçe or nemse in modern Turkish) meant Austrian, the German language, or the Habsburg monarchy from it derives the modern Arabic اَلنَّمْسَاAn-Namsā meaning Austria and نِمْسَاوِيّ Nimsāwiyy meaning Austrian. The term likely originates from the Proto-Slavic word for Germans, němьcь němĭcĭ meaning literally "someone who is mute" referring to foreigners in general and Germans specifically. Modern Arabic refers to a German man as أَلْمَانِيّ ʾAlmāniyy and to Germany as أَلْمَانِيَا ʾAlmāniyā.

In Ottoman Turkish قره (Modern Turkish Kara, Azerbaijani Turkish Qara) means black. It can be found used as first name in Turkish (see for example Kara Osman). The Ottoman Turkish spelling of this first name matches that of an Arabic name held by for example the Sabian Mathematician Thābit ibn Qurra this name however is of semitic origin and has no relation to the Turkish name.

A possible Ottoman Turkish rendition of the name Kara Ben Nemsi would therefore be قره بن نمچی Kara ben Nemçe. As most current Arabic dialects do not have a letter directly corresponding to çīm in Ottoman Turkish and because Persian yeh corresponds to Arabic yāʾ a rendition of the name in modern Arabic would be قره بن نمسي Qara bin Namsī.

In his later work May seems to prefer deriving Kara directly from the color of his beard instead of his first name:

"Concerning my name, I was not called by my actual name but instead as during my previous travels, I was called Kara Ben Nemsi. Kara means "black" and Ben Nemsi "son of Germans". I sported a dark beard and was a German; therefore this name." – EINE BEFREIUNG (A Liberation), 1894

== Original German stories ==
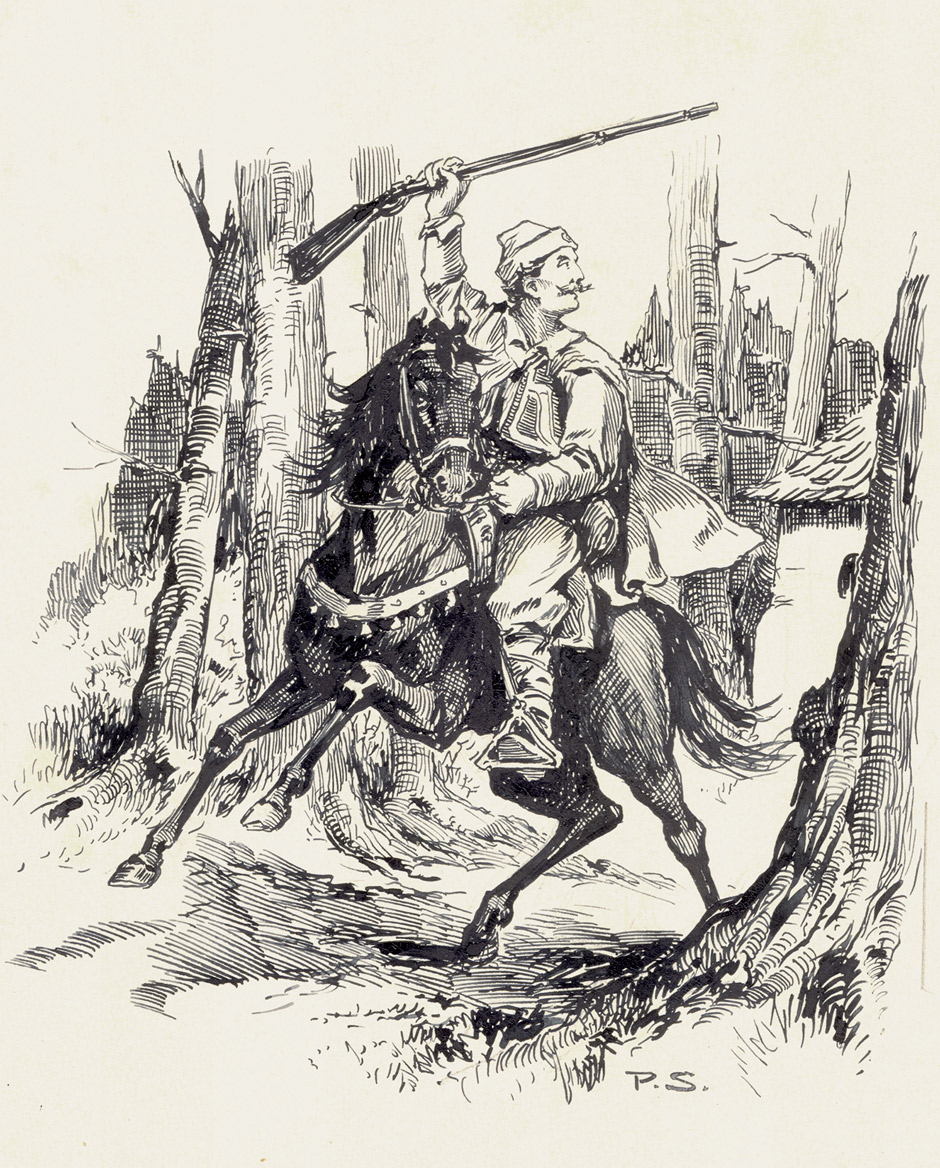
Kara Ben Nemsi on Rih

- Durch Wüste und Harem (1892), since 1895 with the title Durch die Wüste
- Durchs wilde Kurdistan (1892)
- Von Bagdad nach Stambul (1892)
- In den Schluchten des Balkan (1892)
- Durch das Land der Skipetaren (1892)
- Der Schut (1892)
- Orangen und Datteln (1893, Anthology: Die Gum, Der Krumir and others)
- Eine Befreiung (within Die Rose von Kaïrwan, 1894)
- Im Lande des Mahdi I (1896)
- Im Lande des Mahdi II (1896)
- Im Lande des Mahdi III (1896)
- Satan und Ischariot II (1897)
- Er Raml el Helahk (within Auf fremden Pfaden, 1897)
- Blutrache (within Auf fremden Pfaden, 1897)
- Der Kutb (within Auf fremden Pfaden, 1897)
- Der Kys-Kaptschiji (within Auf fremden Pfaden, 1897)
- Maria oder Fatima (within Auf fremden Pfaden, 1897)
- Im Reiche des silbernen Löwen I (1898)
- Die »Umm ed Dschamahl« (1898)
- Im Reiche des silbernen Löwen II (1898)
- Am Jenseits (1899)
- Im Reiche des silbernen Löwen III (1902)
- Im Reiche des silbernen Löwen IV (1903)
- Bei den Aussätzigen (1907)
- Abdahn Effendi (1908)
- Merhameh (1909)
- Ardistan und Dschinnistan I (1909)
- Ardistan und Dschinnistan II (1909)

In the story An der Tigerbrücke (within Am Stillen Ocean, 1894) the first-person narrator mentions, that he is identical to Kara Ben Nemsi and Old Shatterhand.

Within the book series Karl May’s Gesammelte Werke there is a sequel of Am Jenseits: „In Mekka“ (1923) by Franz Kandolf.

== See also ==
- Marah Durimeh
- RIH (bicycle)
