= Pierre Brice =

French actor (1929–2015)

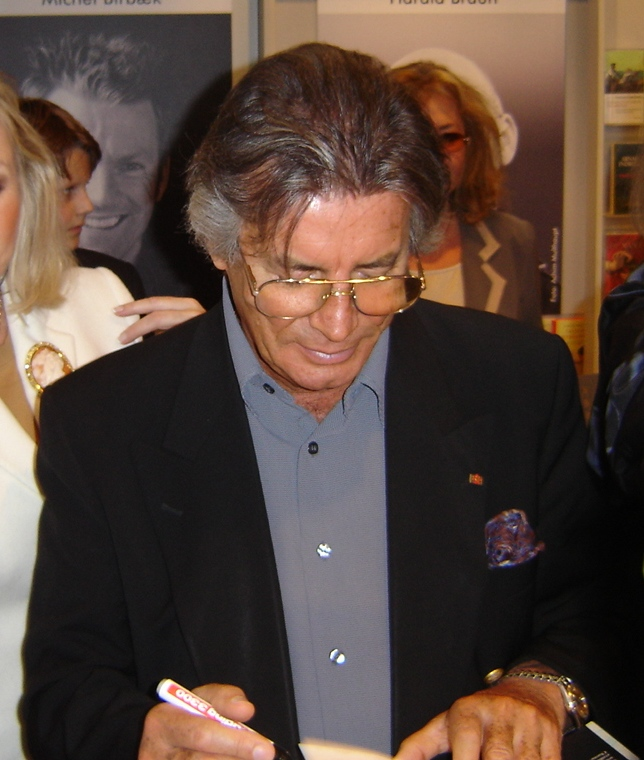
- Pierre Brice, in 2004
- Born: 6 February 1929; Brest, France
- Died: 6 June 2015 (aged 86); Compiègne, France
- Occupation: Actor
- Writing career
- Period: 1954–1997
- Genre: Western

Pierre-Louis Le Bris (6 February 1929 – 6 June 2015), known as Pierre Brice, was a French actor, best known as portraying fictional Apache chief Winnetou in German films based on Karl May novels.

== Life and films ==
Brice was born in Brest, Brittany, France. When he was 19, Brice enlisted in the French Army and fought in the First Indochina War. While patrolling in Indochina, one of his team triggered a mine and its explosion sent Brice whirling through the air, but left him virtually unhurt. A member of the Commandos Marine, special forces units of the French Navy, he served later as a paratrooper during the Algerian War.

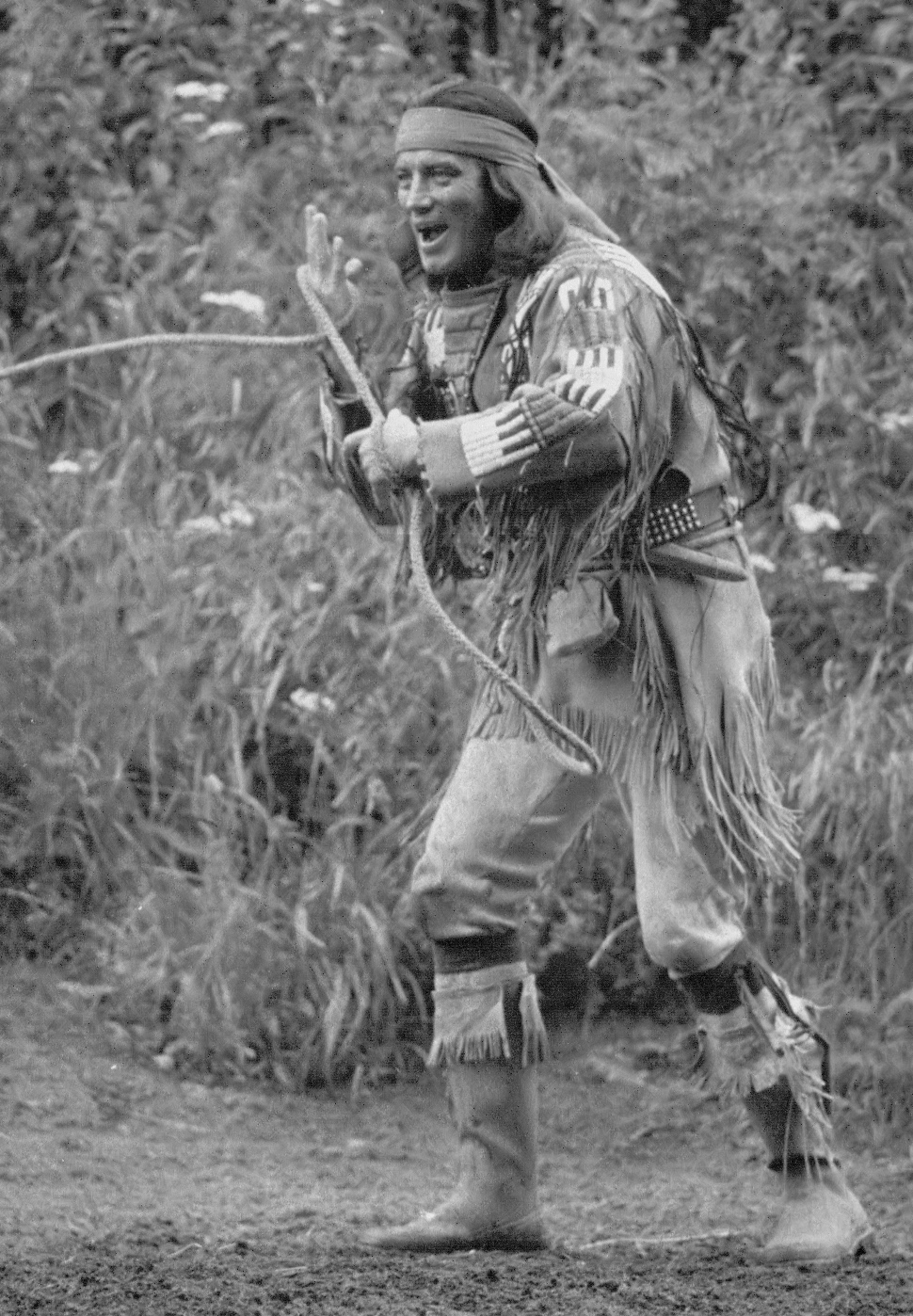
Pierre Brice as Winnetou at the Elspe Festival (ca. 1978)

He was working as actor and model since 1954, but as France had young male stars like Delon, Belmondo, Trintignant, he got leading roles mainly abroad. From 1962 to 1968 he acted in a total of eleven West German Western movies adapted from novels by German author Karl May (1842–1912), in which he played the fictional Native American chief Winnetou of the Mescalero Apache tribe, alongside Lex Barker (7 movies), Stewart Granger (3 movies) and Rod Cameron (1 movie) as co-stars. After the films he also played this role at the Karl May Festspiele in Elspe from 1977 to 1980 and 1982 to 1986 and at the Karl May Festival in Bad Segeberg open-air theatre, Germany, from 1988 to 1991; he also worked there until 1999 as director of several open-air theatre productions. (The open-air theatre in Bad Segeberg is dedicated only to productions of Karl May plays.)

Besides theatre productions, he was mainly seen in TV-series, including Ein Schloß am Wörthersee (A Castle by the Wörthersee) and Die Hütte am See (Lakeview Cottage). In 1979 Brice again played Winnetou in a 14-part TV series called Mein Freund Winnetou (My friend Winnetou – Winnetou le Mescalero), which did not originate from Karl May material. In 1997 he appeared in a two-part TV mini series Winnetous Rückkehr (The Return of Winnetou), which earned devastating criticism from the fans, since the character had died in the movie Winnetou III and now suddenly returned to life. Again, this did not originate from writings by Karl May.

Brice tried to escape the Winnetou character in a 1976 TV series, Star Maidens, and in several movies for the big screen, playing Zorro in the Italian Zorro contro Maciste (1963). He also worked with Terence Hill (still called Mario Girotti at the time) in Shots in Threequarter Time (1965), with Lex Barker in a non-Karl May film The Hell of Manitoba (a.k.a. A Place Called Glory) (1965) and in the anthology Killer's Carnival (1966).

== Singing career ==
Like Lex Barker (who recorded two tracks as a singer), Brice tried to sing with the help of German composer Martin Boettcher, and even managed to issue several singles and CDs. Most of the songs were in German and, as Brice did not understand the language at the time of recording, he had to sing them phonetically.

- PIERRE BRICE: Ich steh' allein / Ribanna – DECCA D 19 557 (mono)
- PIERRE BRICE: Wunderschön / Keiner weiß den Tag – Decca, D 19 560
- PIERRE BRICE: Winnetou, Du warst mein Freund / Meine roten Brüder – Barclay
- PIERRE BRICE: Du fehlst mir / Der große Traum – CBS
- Winnetou du warst mein Freund – 1996, sampler CD, Bear Family Records
  contains the above songs, as well as Lex Barker songs.

== Partial filmography ==
- Ça va barder (1955) – (uncredited)
- Seventh Heaven (1958) – Un joueur
- Young Sinners (Les Tricheurs), directed by Marcel Carné (1958) – Bernard
- Le Miroir à deux faces (1958) – Jacques
- The Restless and the Damned (1959) – (uncredited)
- The Cossacks (1960) – Boris Sarubin
- Lipstick (Il rossetto), directed by Damiano Damiani (1960) – Gino Luciani
- Call Girls of Rome (1960) – L'avvocato Aldo
- Mill of the Stone Women (1960) – Hans von Arnim
- L'Homme à femmes (1960) – Laurent Berty
- The Pharaohs' Woman (La Donna dei Faraoni, 1960) – Amosis the Physician
- The Bacchantes (1961) – Dionysus
- Akiko (1961) – Duilio
- The Robbers (1962) – El Señorito
- Douce violence (1962) – Maddy
- Invasion 1700 (1962) – Jan Ketusky
- Treasure of Silver Lake (1962) – Winnetou
- Un alibi per morire (1962)
- The Shortest Day (1963) – Un ufficiale austriaco (uncredited)
- The Invincible Masked Rider (1963) – Don Diego Morales
- Zorro contro Maciste (Samson and the Slave Queen, 1963) – Zorro / Ramon
- Apache Gold (Winnetou 1, 1963) – Winnetou
- Pacto de silencio (1963) – Jean Clausel
- Old Shatterhand (1964) – Winnetou
- Golden Goddess of Rio Beni (1964) – Jim
- Last of the Renegades (Winnetou 2, 1964) – Winnetou
- Among Vultures (1964) – Winnetou
- Shots in Threequarter Time (1965) – Philippe Tissot
- The Hell of Manitoba (1965) – Reese
- The Oil Prince (1965) – Winnetou
- The Desperado Trail (Winnetou 3, 1965) – Winnetou
- Old Surehand (1965) – Winnetou
- Dacii (1966) – Roman General Septimius Severus
- Killer's Carnival (1966) – Agent Brice (Rome segment)
- Winnetou and the Crossbreed (1966) – Winnetou
- Winnetou and Old Firehand (1966) – Winnetou
- Le Treizième Caprice (1967) – François
- The Valley of Death (1968) – Winnetou
- Un giorno, una vita (1970) – Giuliano
- Erika (1971) – Renato Laurana
- The Night of the Damned (1971) – Jean Duprey
- Les coups pour rien (1971) – Paul
- Sei una carogna... e t'ammazzo! (1972) – Barrett
- Féminin-féminin (1973) – Jacques
- Una cuerda al amanecer (1974) – Campanita 'Little Bell'
- Sex Pot (La pupa del gangster, 1975) – Commissario Salvatore Lambelli
- Star Maidens (1976, TV series) – Adam
- Mein Freund Winnetou (1980, TV series) – Winnetou
- Ein Schloß am Wörthersee (1991–1993, TV series) – André Blondeau
- Hunt for the Blue Diamond (1993, TV film) – Pierre Latouche

== Sources ==
- Pierre Brice biography on (re)Search my Trash
