= Elspe Festival =

German theatre festival

Coordinates: 51°09′10″N 8°02′20″E

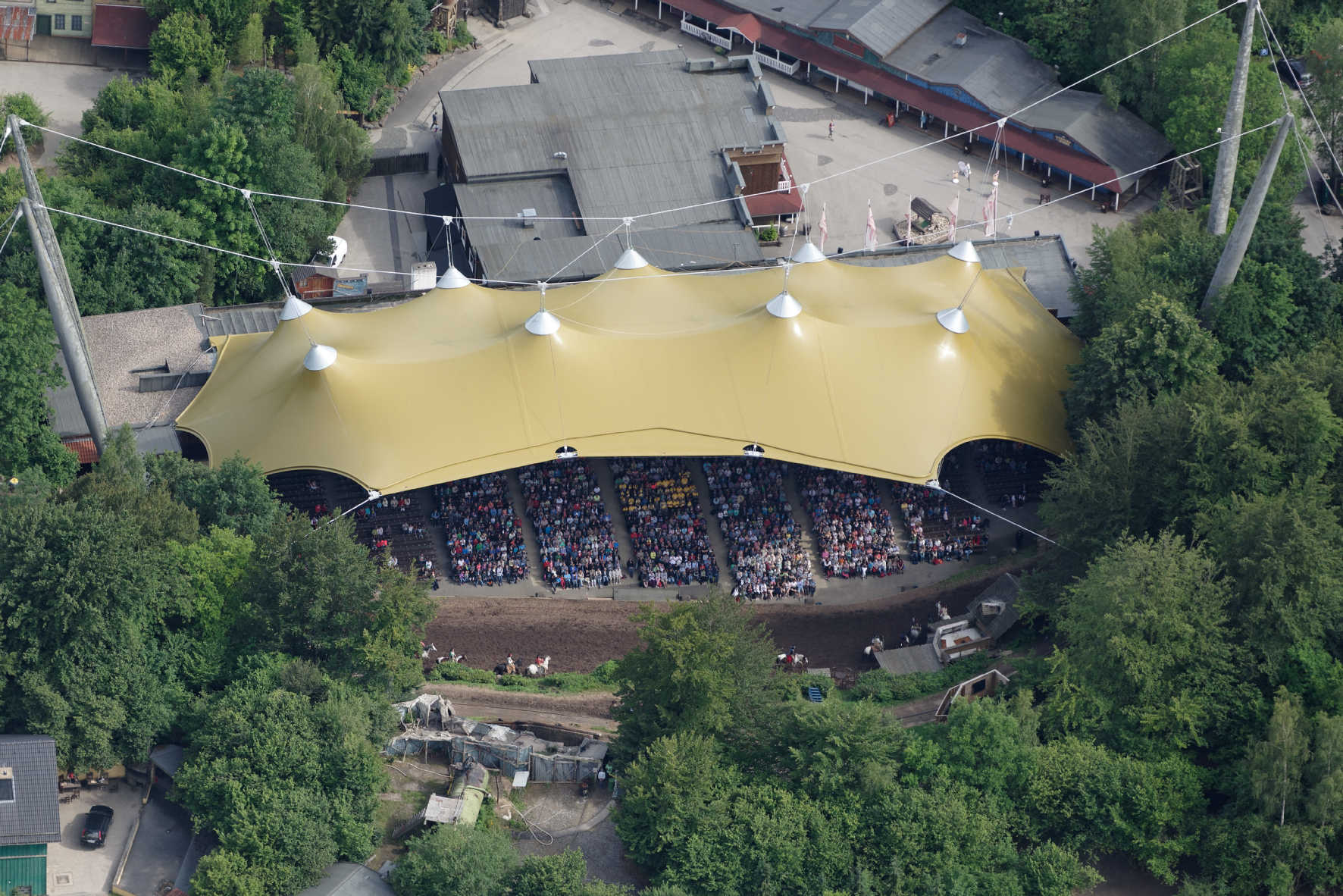
Stage and area for the audience, seen from an airplane

Elspe Festival is a theatre festival in Elspe (Lennestadt), in southeast North Rhine-Westphalia, Germany. It is one of the largest and most popular show and festival parks in Europe, themed on the American Wild West.

== Theatre ==
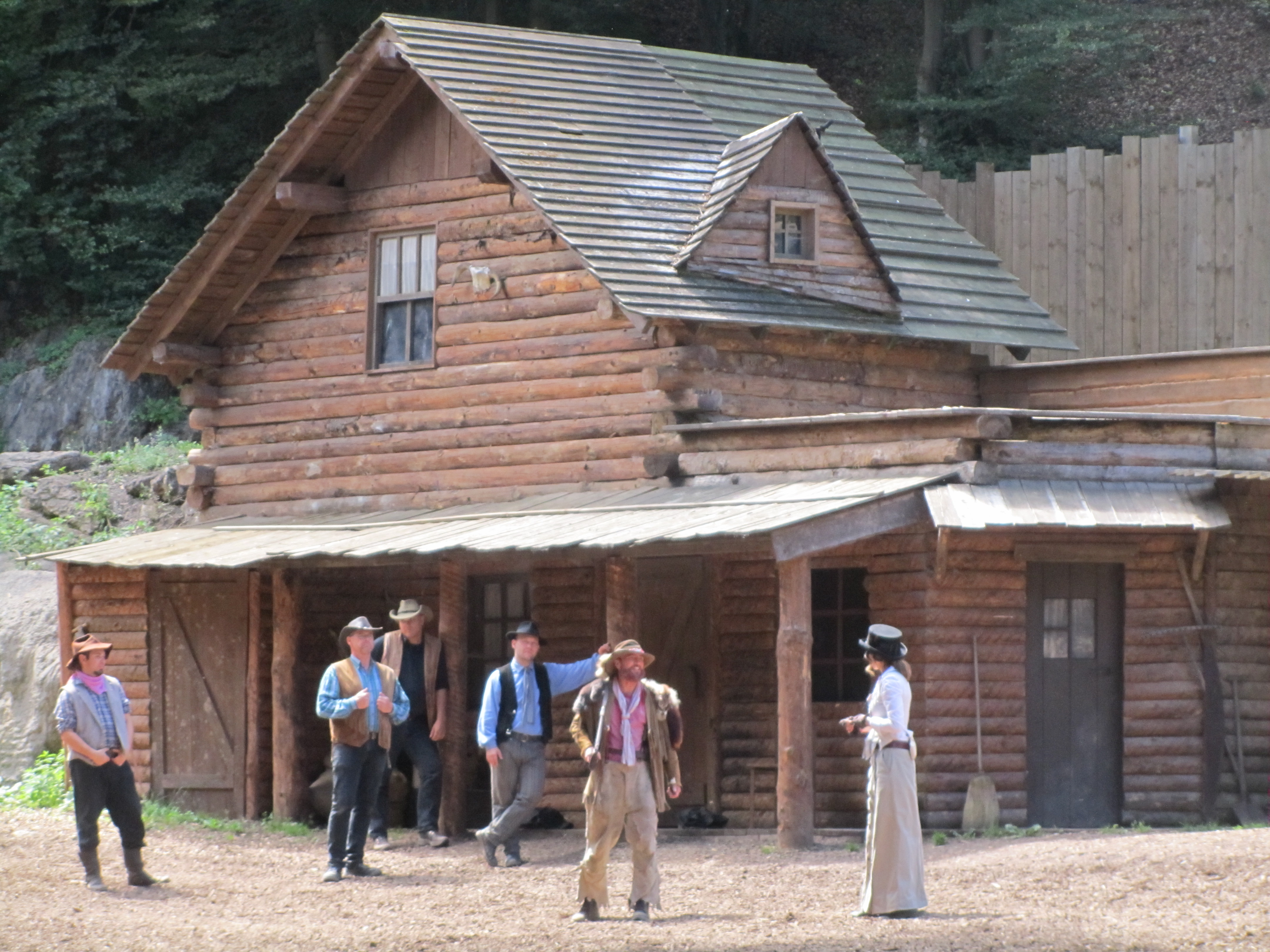
Treasure of the Silverlake in 2015

The site started in 1950 as the Naturbühne Elspe e.V. and presented plays about e.g. Wilhelm Tell and the Nibelungen. In 1958, Winnetou was the first play presented there that was based on a novel by Karl May. Karl May, who had died in 1912, was a hugely popular writer of adventure novels, for example with the Apache chieftain Winnetou or the Arab Hadschi Halef Omar. The numbers of visitors rose from 8,000 to 19,000. Since 1964 the festival presents only plays based on the novels by Karl May.

The festival became even more popular after 1976, when the French actor Pierre Brice starred as Winnetou. He had played the character in enormously popular movies in the 1960s. In 1980, the festival attracted 404,758 visitors. In 2019, the festival has been attracting 219,000 visitors. The site is 120,000 square metres.

The stage is located at a mountain range and covers a difference in altitude of 24 meters. It is 94 meters large. The stage makes use of the limestone environment and local flora. Depending on the play, a saloon, a village, a railway, a waterfall etc. is installed on the stage.

A pillarless roof, which had the same architect as the Munich Olympiastadion, is protecting the audience from the elements; there are 4,000 seats.

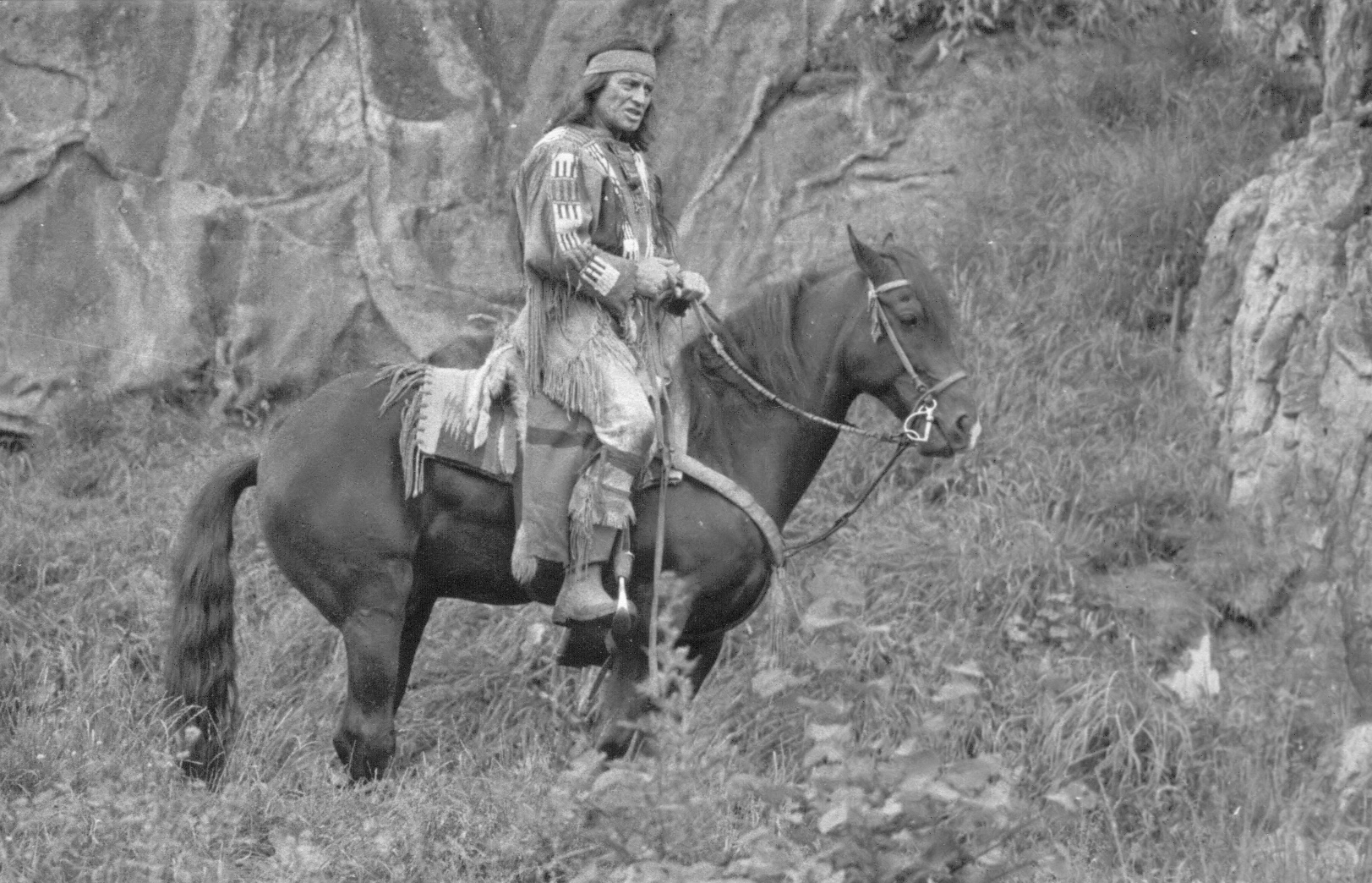
Pierre Brice as Winnetou

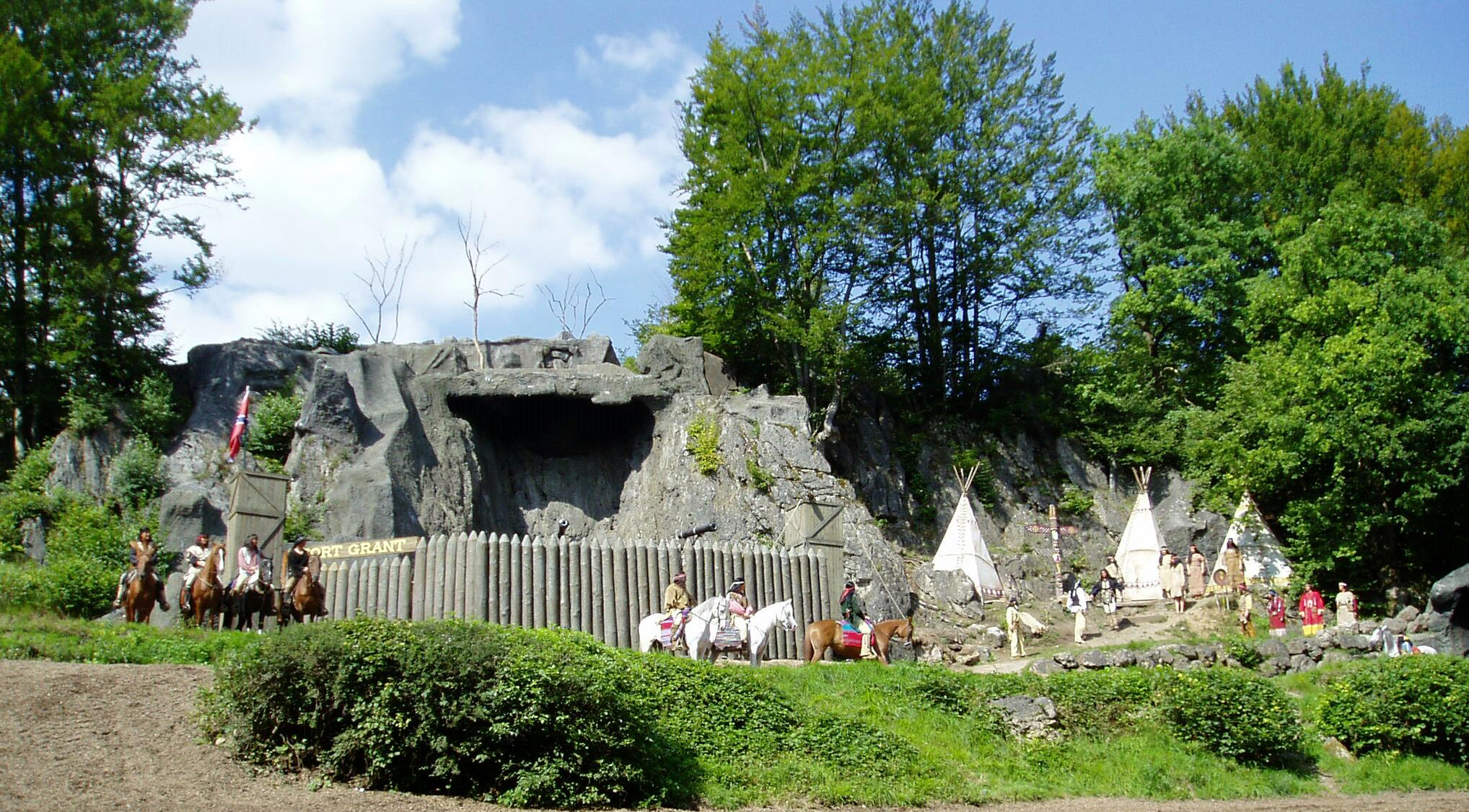
A scene in 2005

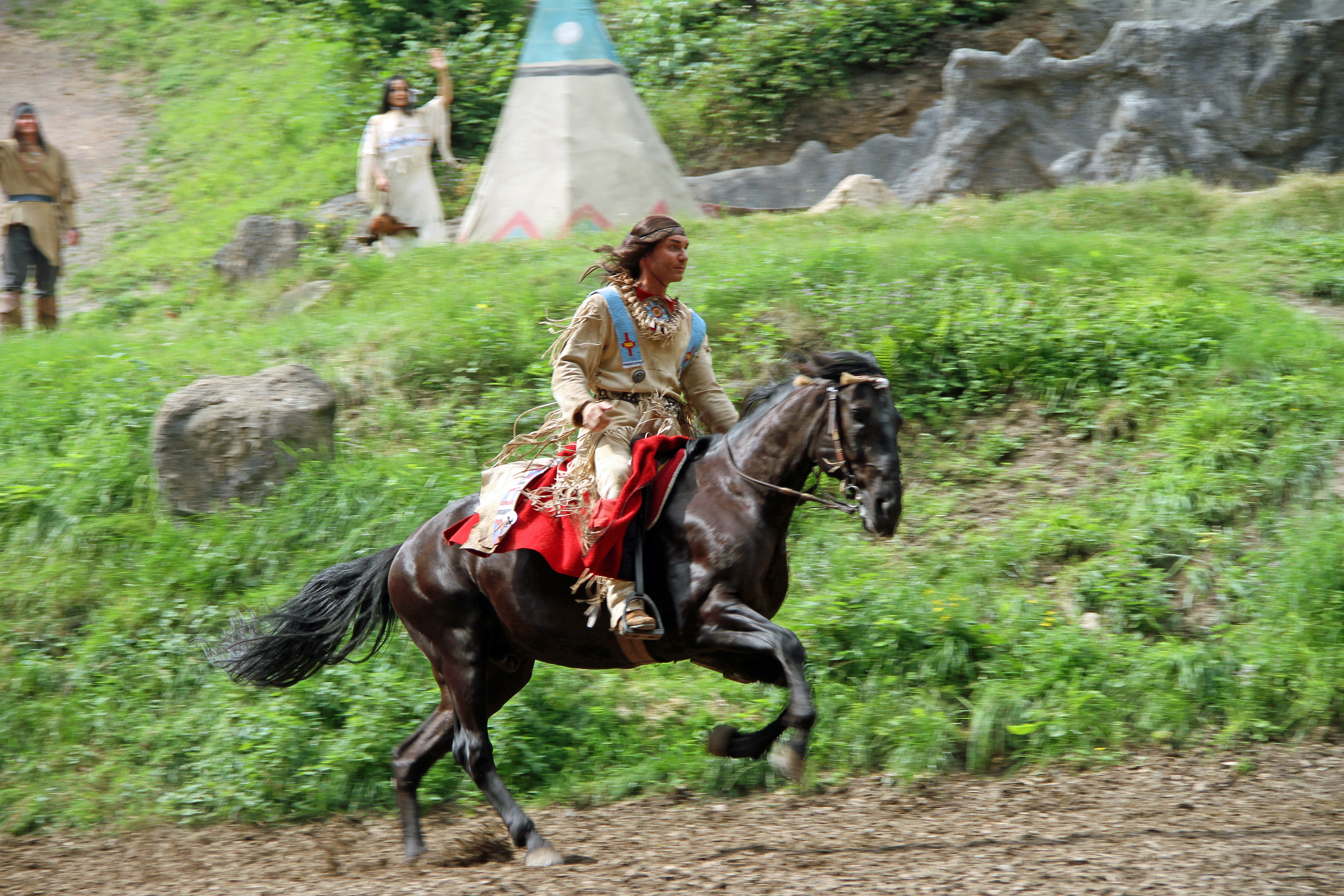
Jean-Marc Birkholz as Winnetou

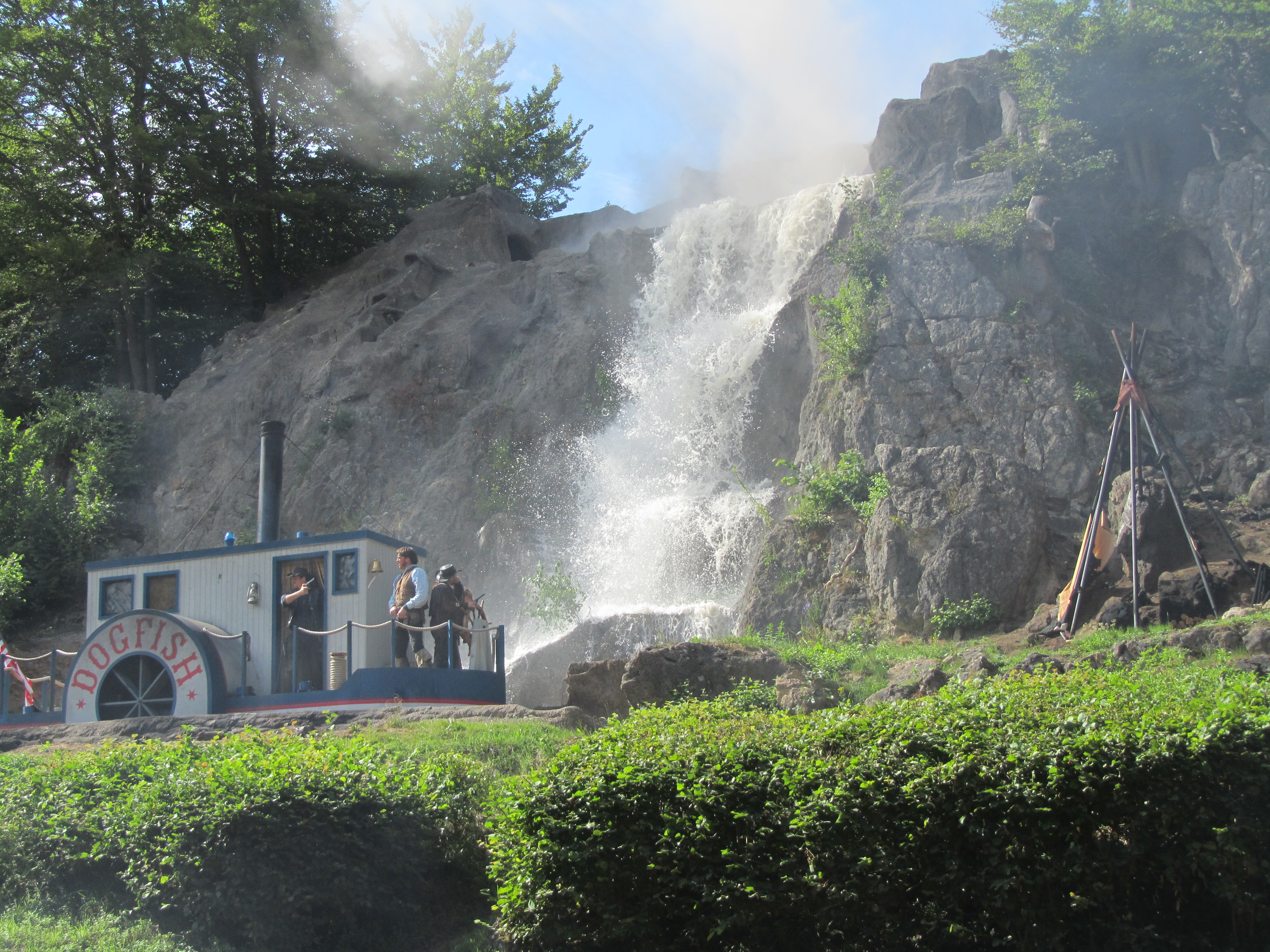
Steam boat and waterfall

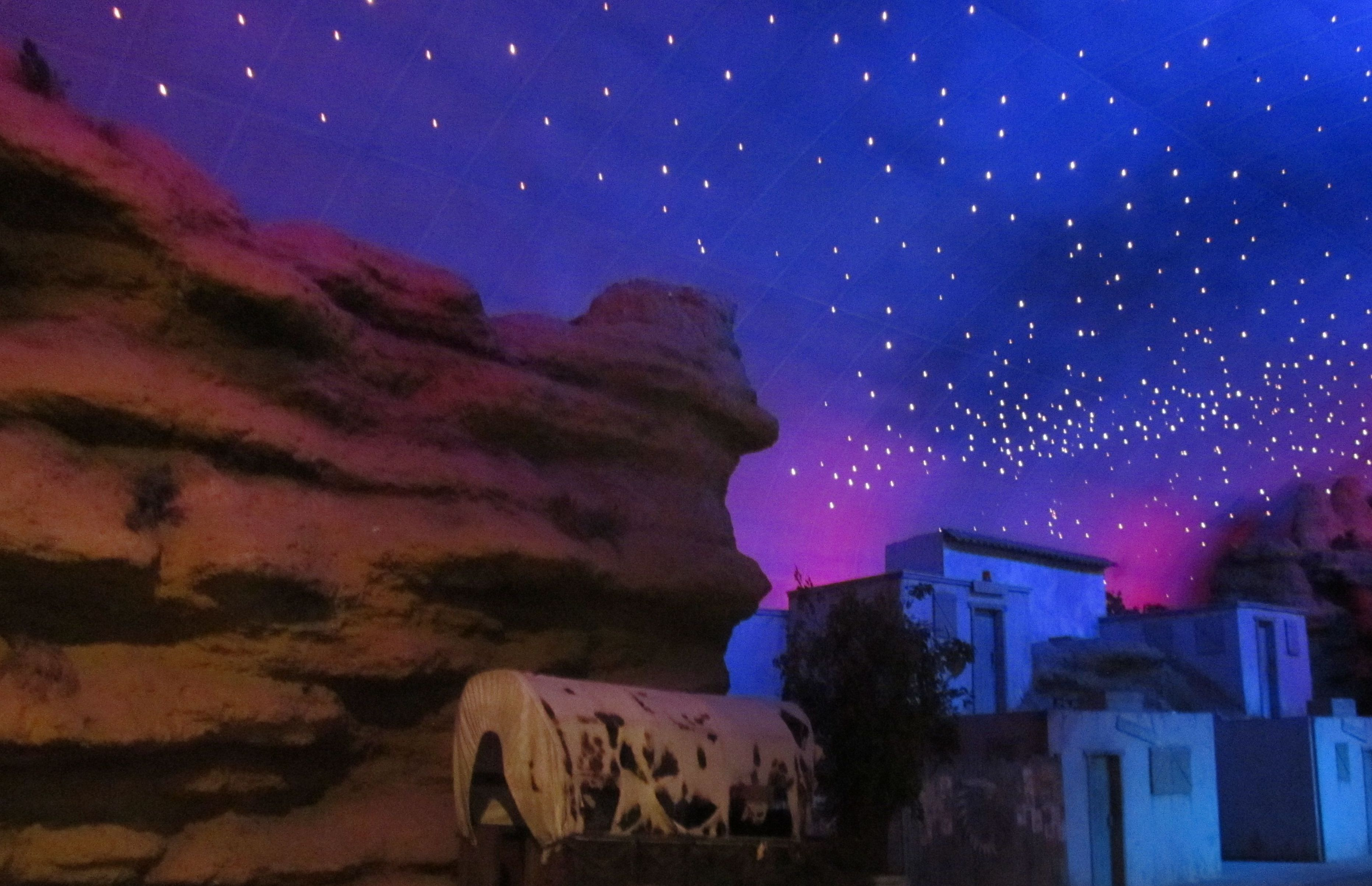
Show hall

== Other attractions ==
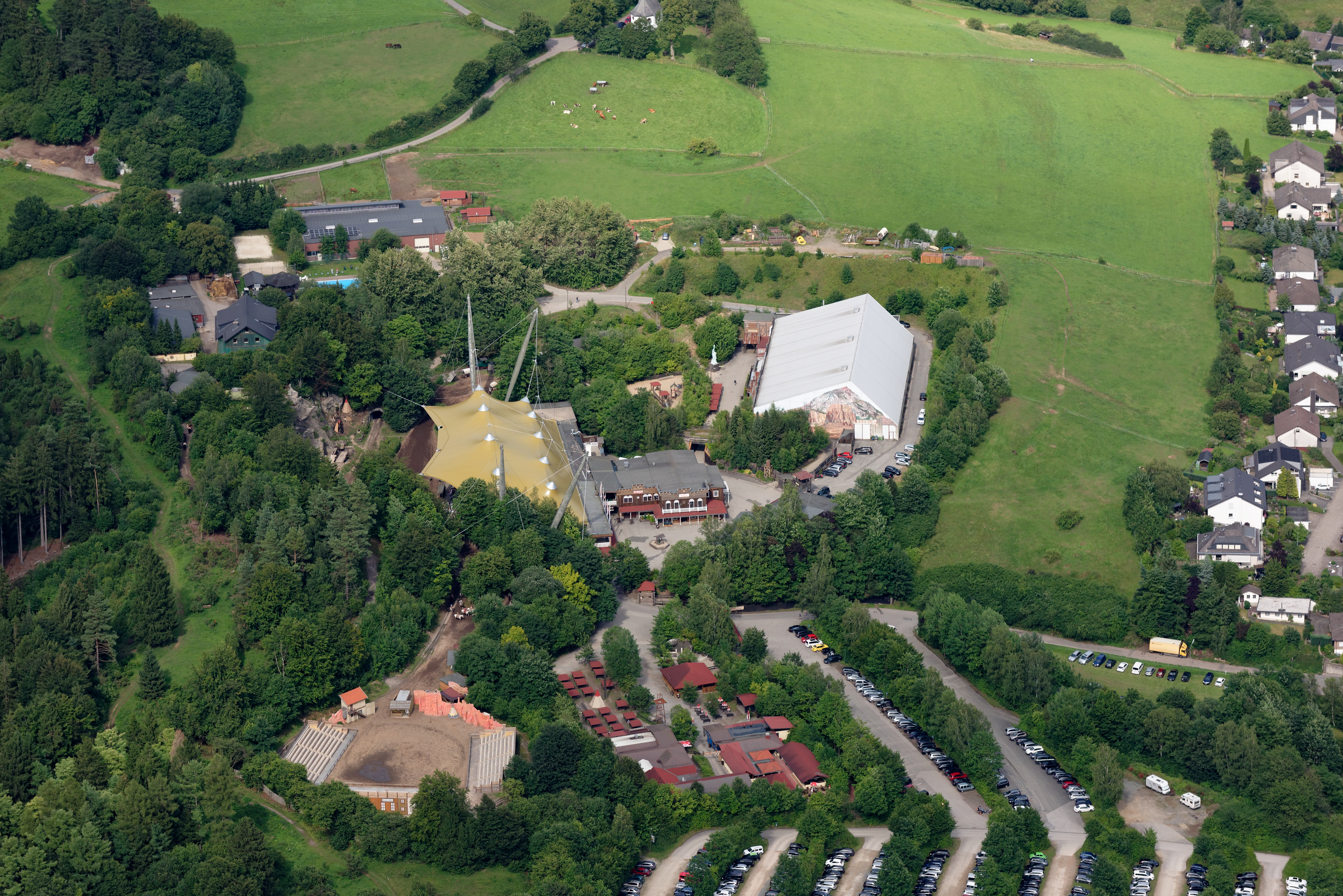
The area from above

The festival area hosts a Western Saloon imitating an original building from Bisbee, Arizona, and other entertainment and catering facilities. The saloon has been used for numerous TV and movie productions in Germany.

Next to the stage there is a festival hall for preprogrammes of the theatre play, and christmas shows. The area also has bird shows, rodeo's, a stunt show, music presentations etc.

== Trivia and criticism ==
Elspe Festival is not to be confused with Karl May Festival in Bad Segeberg (Schleswig-Holstein) or Karl-May-Festtage in Radebeul (Saxony).

Pierre Brice, while virtually unknown in France, was a huge star in Germany. In 1963, Winnetou I was the most popular movie in (West) Germany with 10,000,000 visitors. (In comparison, Dr No attracted 7,000,000 viewers and Cleopatra only 3,000,000).) Brice played Winnetou also in Bad Segeberg.

In general, the Karl May festivals are part of a larger enthusiasm for the American Frontier and especially Native Americans in the German public. It is based on a typically German image of Native Americans that is criticized nowadays as romanticising, idealising and incorrect.
