= The Hell of Manitoba =

1965 film

- Directed by: Sheldon Reynolds
- Written by: Edward Di Lorenzo; Fernando Lamas; F.X. Toole (novel)
- Produced by: Artur Brauner; Miguel de Echarri
- Starring: Lex Barker; Pierre Brice; Gérard Tichy; Marianne Koch
- Cinematography: Federico G. Larraya
- Edited by: Teresa Alcocer; Roberto Cinquini
- Music by: Ángel Arteaga
- Production companies: CCC Film; Midega Film Madrid
- Distributed by: Gloria Film
- Release date: 27 July 1965
- Running time: 92 minutes
- Countries: West Germany; Spain; Italy
- Languages: German; Spanish; Italian

The Hell of Manitoba (German: Die Hölle von Manitoba) is a 1965 West-German-Spanish-Italian western film directed by Sheldon Reynolds and starring Lex Barker, Pierre Brice and Gérard Tichy. In the United States it was released under the alternative title of A Place Called Glory.

== Production ==
The production re-teamed Barker and Brice who were currently starring in a series of popular Karl May westerns. The film's sets were designed by the art directors Enrique Alarcón and Heinrich Weidemann. It was shot at studios in Barcelona as well as on location in Andalucía.

== Synopsis ==
Two celebrated gunfighters are separately hired to come to a small Canadian town in Manitoba named "Glory" and fight each other. Instead they join forces and take on a bandit gang that dominates the area.

== Cast ==
- Lex Barker as Clint Brenner
- Pierre Brice as Reese
- Gérard Tichy as Jack Villaine
- Ángel del Pozo as Josh
- Marianne Koch as Jade Grande
- Hans Nielsen as Mayor
- Carlos Casaravilla as Judge
- Jorge Rigaud as Seth Grande
- Wolfgang Lukschy as Charly - Barkeeper
- Aldo Sambrell as Jake
- Santiago Ontañón as Bankier
- Antonio Molino Rojo as Sam
- Luis Barboo as Gunman
- Víctor Israel
- Roberto Martín
- Moisés Augusto Rocha as Henchman

== Bibliography ==
- Bergfelder, Tim. International Adventures: German Popular Cinema and European Co-Productions in the 1960s. Berghahn Books, 2005.
