= Bernd Jorkisch =

German entrepreneur

Bernd Edgar Jorkisch
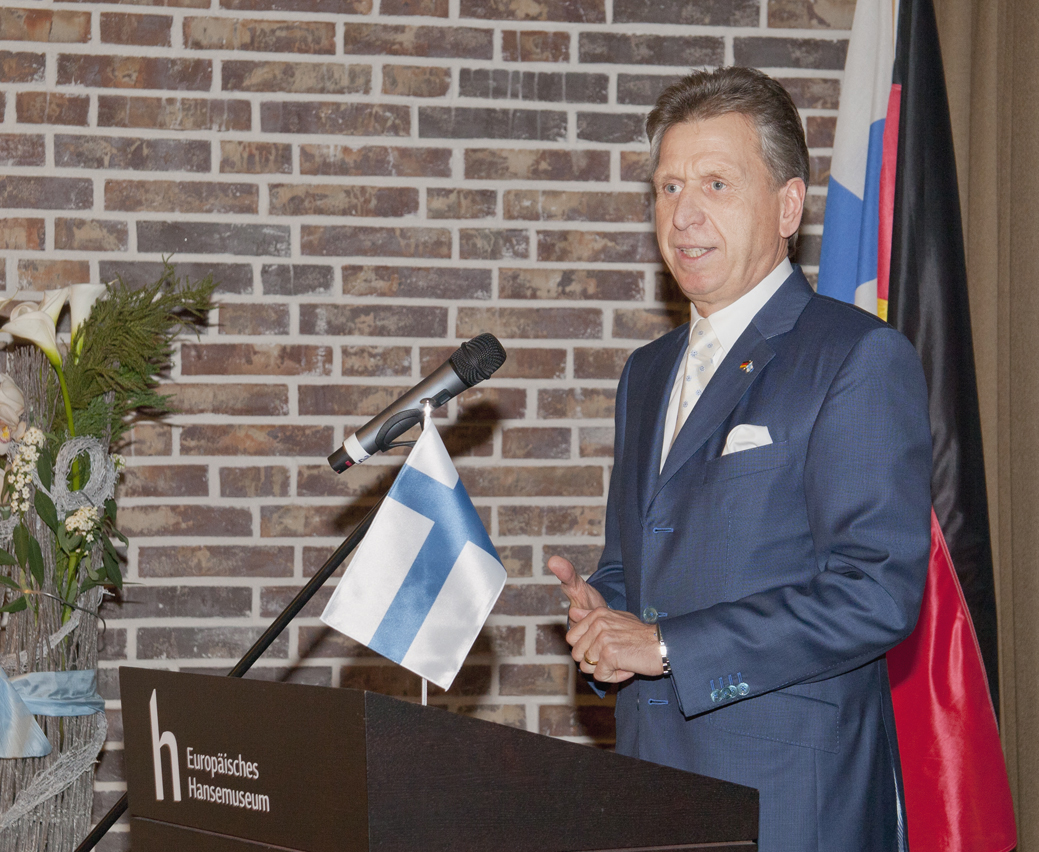
- Honorary Consul Bernd Jorkisch 2016
- Born: August 6, 1957 (age 68); Bad Segeberg, Germany
- Occupations: Entrepreneur and honorary consul

Bernd Edgar Jorkisch (born August 6, 1957, in Bad Segeberg) is a German entrepreneur. He is managing partner of the timber importer Jorkisch GmbH & Co. KG in Daldorf, Schleswig-Holstein, and honorary consul of the Republic of Finland.

== Life and career ==
After graduating from secondary school in 1975, Jorkisch commenced his training as a technician, which he completed in 1978. He joined his parents' timber trading business and acquired a small sawmill in Daldorf in 1978. In 1986 he became the sole owner of this company. In 1995, he acquired a second location in Fehrenbötel, Schleswig-Holstein. From 1993 to 2003, he operated a "joint venture sawmill" in the Republic of Latvia. In 1997, company growth necessitated the transformation to Jorkisch GmbH & Co. KG. In 1998, a third company location was established as a production site in Friedland, Mecklenburg-Western Pomerania, in the form of a sister company.

Jorkisch is married, father to three daughters and lives in Bad Segeberg.

== Work ==
As president of the Lübeck Chamber of Commerce and Industry from 2004 to 2010 and as vice president from 2010 to 2016, Jorkisch was able to advocate for a region-building process. This process took the form of a northern German cooperation of Hamburg and Schleswig-Holstein, through the self-government of the business community. As chairman of the state committee on economy, infrastructure, and housing of the CDU Schleswig-Holstein, he is committed to an "Alliance in the North" with a focus on economic future issues. The Alliance aims to foster the close cooperation of Hamburg, Schleswig-Holstein, and Denmark. Alongside this, he has committed to development prospects in the Baltic Sea region. Jorkisch additionally holds the role of chairman of the board of the HanseBelt Initiativkreis e.V. As part of this role, he is working toward the realization of the Fehmarn Belt Fixed Link and the strengthening of the HanseBelt region as part of the European future axis plans for Hamburg-Copenhagen/Malmö.

Jorkisch is Honorary Consul of the Republic of Finland and a commercial judge at Lübeck District Court.

== Social commitment, honorary posts ==
- Chairman of the board of Tafelstiftung Schleswig-Holstein / Hamburg
- Former Board of directors of the German-Danish Chamber of Commerce
- Supervisory board of the Sparkasse zu Lübeck
- Member of the Enquete Commission "North German Cooperation" of the Schleswig-Holstein State Parliament (2012-2014)
- Member of the Federal Committee on Finance, economics and Energy of the CDU Germany

== Awards ==
- 2006: "Promoter of Small and Medium-Sized Businesses of the Year 2006", award of the Lübeck District Association of Businesses and Medium-Sizes Businesses
- 2006: "Recognition Award Sustainability in Schleswig-Holstein" Award of the association "Zukünftiges Schleswig-Holstein" - Friends of Environmental Academy e. V.
- 2010: Chamber medal of the Hamburg Chamber of Commerce
- 2010: Silver Badge of Honor of the District Chamber of Crafts Mittelholstein
- 2013: Melvin Jones Fellow - Lions Club International
- 2015: Badge of Merit in Gold from the German Lifesaving Society, DLRG
- 2016: Gold Medal of Honor from the Lübeck Chamber of Industry and Commerce, IHK
- 2016: Golden pin of honor of the SV Todesfelde
- 2018: Order of Merit of the Federal Republic of Germany
- 2019: Golden pin of honor of the boarding school Schloss Rohlstorf
