= Segeberger Kalkberg =

Coordinates: 53°56′08″N 10°19′03″E

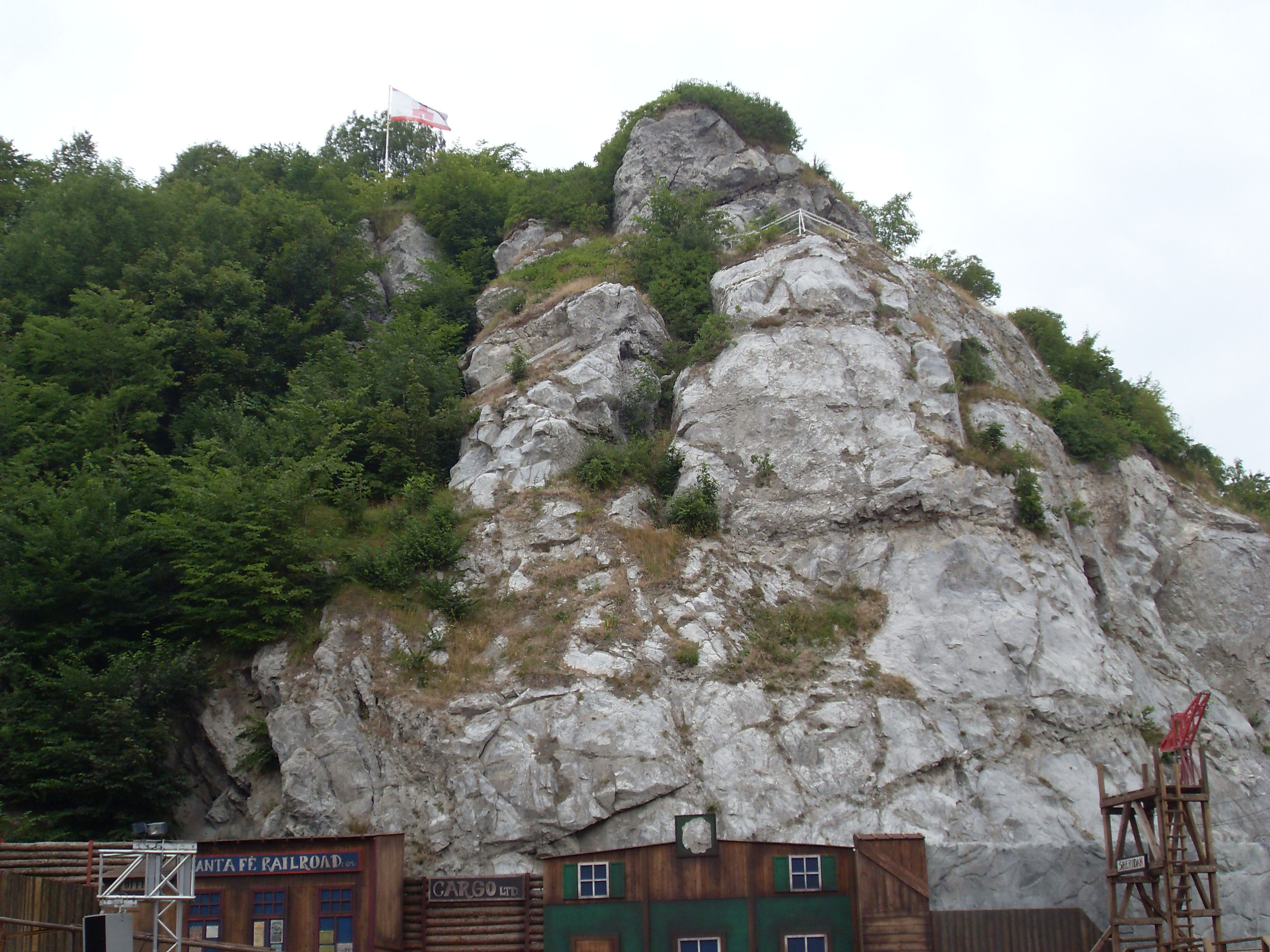
The Kalkberg

The Kalkberg (lit. "chalk mountain") is a 91-metre-high rock in the center of Bad Segeberg, Schleswig-Holstein, Germany. The name is a misnomer as it is not made of limestone (calcium carbonate), but from gypsum (calcium sulfate).

== Geology ==
The gypsum was formed as sulfate evaporite sediments, which were deposited about 250 million years ago by the Zechstein Sea. Smaller disturbances in the more recent epochs of earth history allowed the less dense Zechstein salts to flow together and force their way upwards from a great depth into the younger overlying rocks to a level near that of the present-day surface. Under the Kalkberg is a salt dome, which rises by one to two millimeters a year. The red cliffs of Heligoland or the Münsterdorfer Geestinsel are limestone, one of the few formations in Schleswig-Holstein which was not created by the ice ages. The mining of the salt dome ended in 1860. From the salt dome comes the brine feeding the saltwater bath that give Bad Segeberg its name.

== History ==
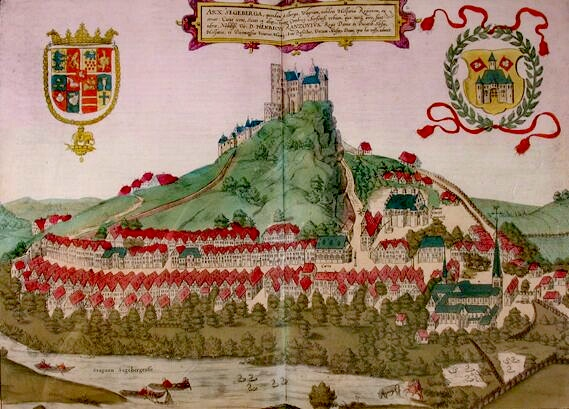
Old view of the Kalkberg

Originally, the Kalkberg was about 110 m high. After centuries of mining of the gypsum, it stands only 91 meters today. In the Middle Ages, Lothair of Saxony built Siegburg Castle on the mountain - then called Alberg'. The Counts of Schauenburg and Holstein established twice a secundogeniture seated on the Siegburg Castle. The secundogeniture was called County of Stormarn, or Holstein-Segeberg after its mother line and the capital.

Between 1273 and 1308 Adolphus V the Pomeranian, second-born brother of Count John II the One-Eyed of Holstein-Kiel, resided on the castle. Adolphus V was succeeded by John's second-born son Adolphus VII, ruling 1308 to 1315. In 1315 Adolphus VII was slain on Siegburg Castle in his bed by a group of knights led by Hartwig Reventlow personally at feud with him. Holstein-Segeberg was then reincorporated into Holstein-Kiel, itself merged into Holstein-Rendsburg in 1390.

In 1397 Holstein-Rendsburg partitioned Holstein-Segeberg again as a secundogeniture with Siegburg Castle as residence, this time for Gerhard VI's younger brother Albert (Albrecht) II. In 1403 Gerhard regained Holstein-Segeberg by way of reversion upon Albert's death in action against Ditmarsh. Siegburg Castle was destroyed in the Thirty Years War by the Swedes. Today, only a well shaft remains.

In 1913, limestone caves which located in the lower part of the rock were discovered. They are home to bats and the only known Segeberg cave beetles (Choleva septentrionis holsatica).

Before the First World War, the Kalkberg was property of the Prussian state, which every year made considerable profits from the gypsum mining. After the discovery of the cave, the Prussian Ministry of Trade and Industry agreed to quarry operation with the provision of long-term protection of the town of Bad Segeberg. In 1922 the city finally purchased the hill. The commitment to the preservation of the mountain came only quite late: mining ended in 1931. Over the years, the rock lost about two-thirds of its original mass.

Between 1934-1937, the Reich Labor Service built the Kalkberg Stadium, in the pit created by the gypsum mining. This is an outdoor stage with about 7,800 seats and standing room for 12,000. The Karl May Festival has been held here every year since 1952.

Until 11 April 1942, the remains of the Kalkberg and part of the cave was designated a natural monument. The natural monument included only to the open faces and the rock immediately below the cave. Large parts of the cave system were thus legally unprotected.

The Protection Order on 18 September 1995 expanded protection to the cave in its full extent and Little Segeberg Lake (at the foot of the Kalkberg) as a nature reserve. Thus, Kalkberg, cave and Little Segeberg Lake were recorded here for the first time as a geological unit.

== Tourism ==
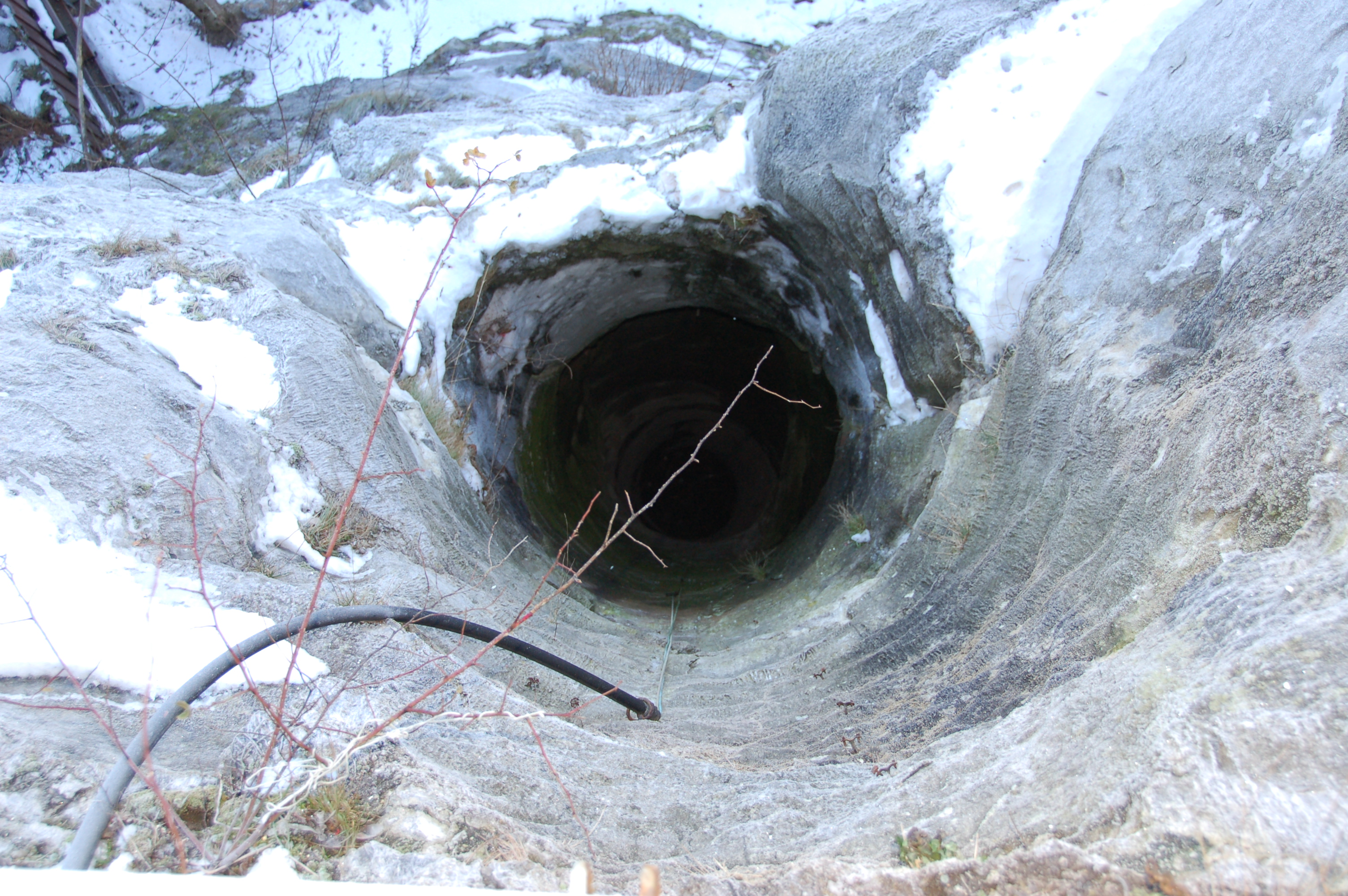
Kalkberg well shaft

There are paved walk ways up to the summit platform, which is a popular viewing point. The view extends all around well into the hills of Schleswig-Holstein, in good visibility up to the church towers of Lübeck. A staircase leads from the "Gipfelweg" (Summit Way) from the edge of the 43-meter-deep well shaft of the former castle. Visits to the Kalkberg cave are possible between April and September.

== See also ==
- Lüneburger Kalkberg, a limestone formation in the Lower Saxony town of Lüneburg
