= Werner Wrangel =

German military official

- Born: 24 March 1922; Passopp, Bad Segeberg, Weimar Republic
- Died: 24 March 1945 (aged 23) near Trebur, Nazi Germany
- Military career
- Allegiance: Nazi Germany
- Branch: Army
- Service years: 1935–45
- Rank: Unteroffizier (Wehrmacht)
- Unit: 1./Panzer-Jäger-Abteilung 160, Panzerjager Battalion 183
- Conflicts: World War II
- Awards: Knight's Cross of the Iron Cross; Iron Cross 1st Class; Iron Cross 2nd Class; Infantry Assault Badge in Silver

Werner Wrangel (24 March 1922 – 24 March 1945) was a Gefreiter in the German Army during World War II, who received three of Germany's highest military decorations during a single combat action. He was the only person ever to do so. Wrangel received the Iron Cross 2nd class, Iron Cross 1st Class, and the Knight's Cross of the Iron Cross simultaneously on 8 February 1943 for outstanding valour in repulsing a Soviet tank attack with his PAK gun virtually single-handedly, thereby saving the lives of hundreds of his comrades. Additionally, he received the Infantry Assault Badge (Sturmabzeichen) in silver. At the time he served with 1./Panzer-Jäger-Abteilung 160. Wrangel died in combat on 24 March 1945 near Trebur.

== Awards ==
- Knight's Cross of the Iron Cross on 8 February 1943 as Gefreiter and Richtschütze (gunner) in the 1./Panzer-Jäger-Abteilung 183
