= Shots in Threequarter Time =

- Directed by: Alfred Weidenmann
- Written by: Herbert Reinecker
- Story by: Ludmilla Kirsch
- Produced by: Felice Testa Gay
- Starring: Pierre Brice; Heinz Drache; Daliah Lavi; Jana Brejchová; Terence Hill
- Cinematography: Karl Löb
- Music by: Charly Niessen
- Release date: 1965
- Countries: Austria; West Germany; Italy
- Language: German

Shots in Threequarter Time (German: Schüsse im Dreivierteltakt, Italian: Operazione terzo uomo) is a 1965 crime film directed by Alfred Weidenmann.

== Plot ==
The film begins in Paris. Carrying a metal suitcase, a man called Bérard flees from his pursuers. He boards a chairlift and, following instructions received on a walkie-talkie, at a certain point he lets the suitcase drop to the ground. Then he is shot by an unrecognisable sniper. The suitcase contains a strictly guarded NATO controller for missiles. The so-called B 501 was stolen and is now in enemy hands. There is just this one device and, accordingly, frenzy prevails at the Paris command post of NATO. Given eight days to recover it, the colonel in command puts his best man, secret agent Philippe Tissot, on the case. Tissot adopts the code name "Caesar" for his undercover operation and starts tracking down the missing device.

This trail leads to Vienna. Tissot takes the night train and comes across various strange and suspicious characters already during the journey. Once arrived in the Austrian capital, Tissot pays a visit to the "Palladium", a variety theatre with a very dubious reputation as a transit point for stolen goods and secrets as well as a magnet for enemy agents and assassins. Tissot soon finds himself in great peril and the first casualties occur. Another trail leads him to a waxworks. After an exciting chase through Vienna Tissot can finally bring the control unit back in.

== Cast ==
- Pierre Brice as Philippe Tissot (dubbed by Gert Günther Hoffmann)
- Heinz Drache as Pierre Gilbert
- Daliah Lavi as Irina Badoni (dubbed by Renate Heilmeyer)
- Jana Brejchová as Violetta (dubbed by Uta Hallant)
- Charles Régnier as Henry
- Walter Giller as Renato Balli
- Terence Hill as Enrico (credited as Mario Girotti; dubbed by Harry Wüstenhagen)
- Gustav Knuth as Igor
- Anton Diffring as Burger (dubbed by Heinz Petruo)
- Senta Berger as Captain Jenny (dubbed by Gisela Reißmann)
- Paola Pitagora as Claudette
- Daniël Sola as Joscha (dubbed by Lothar Blumhagen)
- Walter Regelsberger as Gorba (dubbed by Karlheinz Brunnemann)
- Hans Unterkircher as Bernard (dubbed by Siegfried Schürenberg)
- Mister Tu as Dr. Schang (dubbed by Gerd Martienzen)
- Karl Zarda as Ledin (dubbed by Curt Ackermann)
- Erica Vaal as Jeanette
