= Karl May Festival in Bad Segeberg =

German theatre festival

Coordinates: 53.9355°N 10.317528°E

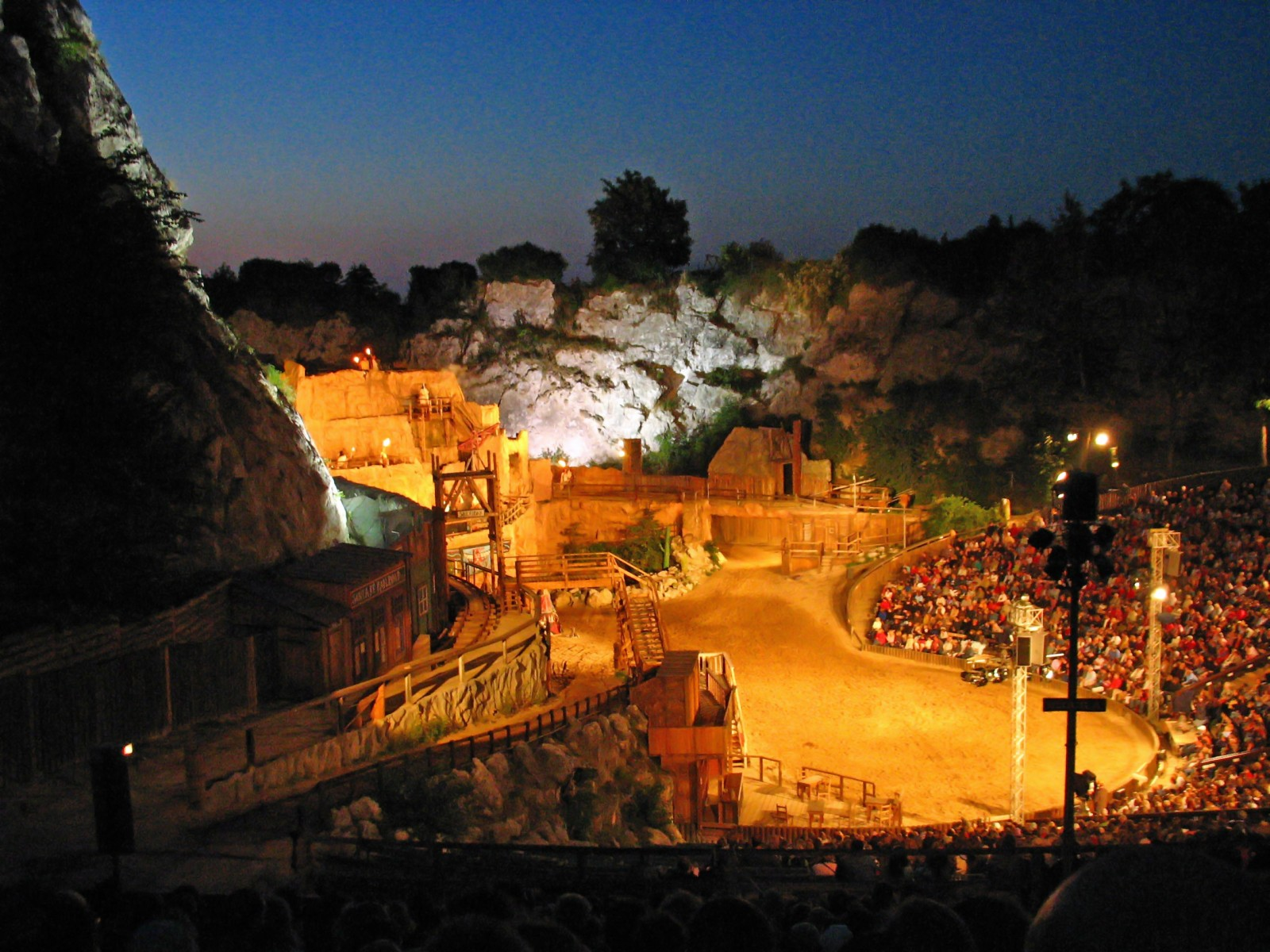
Performance by night in August 2009

The 'Karl May Festival' (German: Karl-May-Spiele Bad Segeberg,') is a theatre festival in Bad Segeberg, Schleswig-Holstein, Germany. The festival has been held annually since 1952 and, since that year, Karl May's adventure novels about the Wild West have been put on stage as part of Karl May Festival in the Kalkberg Stadium at the scenic Segeberger Kalkberg.

The festival is not to be confused with Elspe Festival, another theatre festival in North Rhine-Westphalia, or Karl May Festtage in Radebeul.
