= Bad Segeberg =

- Town
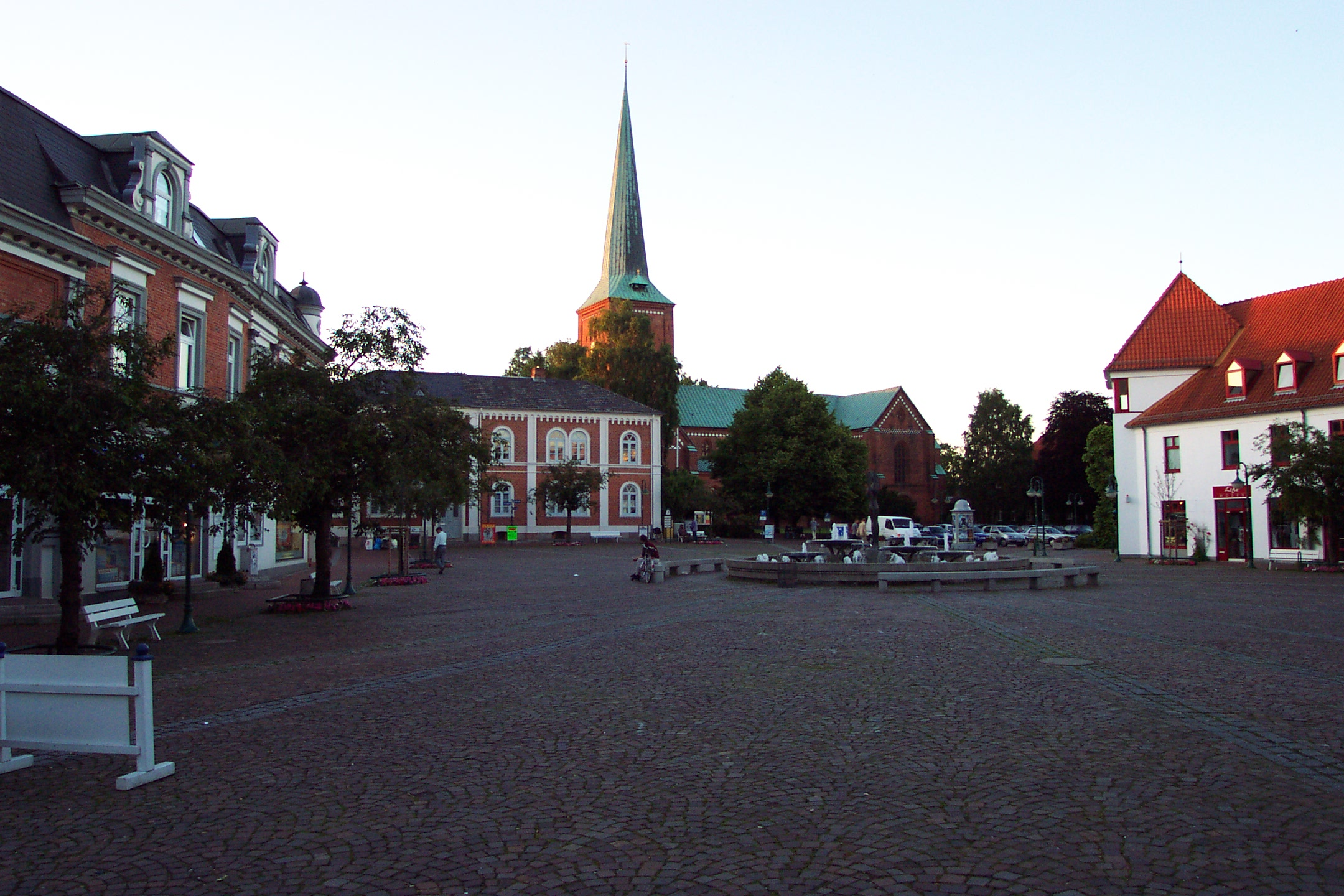

- Coat of arms

- Location of Bad Segeberg within Segeberg district
- Interactive map of Bad Segeberg
- Location within Germany Location within Schleswig-Holstein
- Coordinates: 53°55′N 10°19′E
- Country: Germany
- State: Schleswig-Holstein
- District: Segeberg

Government
  - Mayor: Toni Köppen

Area
  - Total: 18.87 km^{2} (7.29 sq mi)
- Elevation: 27 m (89 ft)

Population (2025-12-31)
  - Total: 18,508
  - Density: 980.8/km^{2} (2,540/sq mi)
- Time zone: UTC+01:00 (CET)
  - Summer (DST): UTC+02:00 (CEST)
- Postal codes: 23781–23795 2360
- Dialling codes: 04551
- Vehicle registration: SE
- Website: www.badsegeberg.de

Bad Segeberg (German: [baːt ˈzeːɡəbɛʁk]; Low German: Sebarg) is a German town of 16,000 inhabitants, located in the state of Schleswig-Holstein, capital of the district (Kreis) Segeberg. It is situated approximately 50 kilometers (31 mi) northeast of Hamburg, and 25 kilometers (16 mi) west of Lübeck.

It is famous for its Karl May Festival, held annually since 1952, which takes place in the town's Kalkberg Stadium, a large amphitheater originally built by the Reich Labour Service into an exploited quarry at the Segeberger Kalkberg.

There is a large television tower in the middle of the town.

== Geography ==
Bad Segeberg is not far from the eastern edge of the hills of Ostholstein. The western part of the town is bordered by the Trave, the northern part by the Ihlsee and forests, the northeast is bordered by the Großer Segeberger See, and the west is also bordered by forests. In the south, Bad Segeberg is bordered by the towns of Högersdorf and Klein Gladebrügge.

Geologically, the area around Bad Segeberg is unique because it is the only area with Karst topography in Schleswig-Holstein, which is indicated by the presence of sinkholes in the area. There were even sinkholes in the town itself, although these have all been filled in and are no longer visible. The only exception is the Kleiner Segeberger See, which is a sinkhole that is filled with water at the foot of the Segeberger Kalkberg.

== Notable people ==
- Werner Wrangel (1922 in Passopp – 1945), decorated Army officer
- Maria Jepsen (born 1945), Lutheran bishop
- Christian Habicht (1952–2010), actor
- Bernd Jorkisch (born 1957), entrepreneur and President of the Lübeck Chamber of Commerce and Industry from 2004 to 2010
- Gero Storjohann (born 1958), politician, member of the CDU
- Claus Christian Claussen (born 1961), politician, member of the CDU
- Detlev Buck (born 1962), film director, actor, producer and screenwriter
- Eilika Duchess of Oldenburg (born 1972), wife of Georg von Habsburg
- Alexander Holtmann (born 1978), cinema, television and theatre actor

=== Sport ===
- Frauke Kuhlmann (born 1966), women's international footballer
- Mona Barthel (born 1990), tennis player
- Rachel Rinast (born 1991), footballer, played over 280 pro games
- Janek Sternberg (born 1992), footballer, played over 260 pro games
- Fiete Arp (born 2000), footballer, played over 120 pro games

== Twin towns – sister cities ==
Bad Segeberg is twinned with:

- Kiryat Motzkin, Israel
- Riihimäki, Finland
- Teterow, Germany
- Võru, Estonia
- Złocieniec, Poland
