= Kalkberg Stadium =

Coordinates: 53.9354°N 10.3176°E

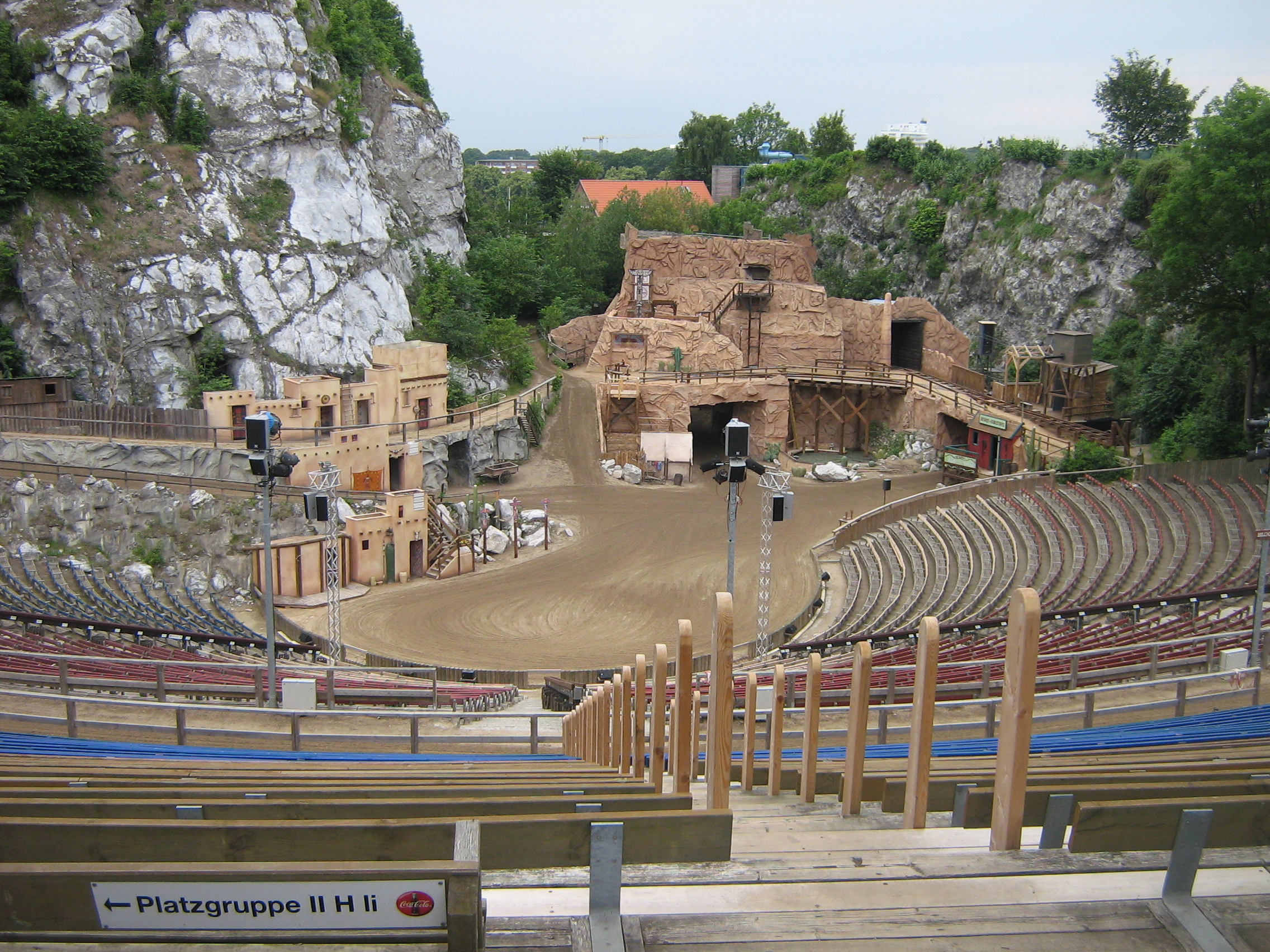
Stage view, Kalkberg Stadium

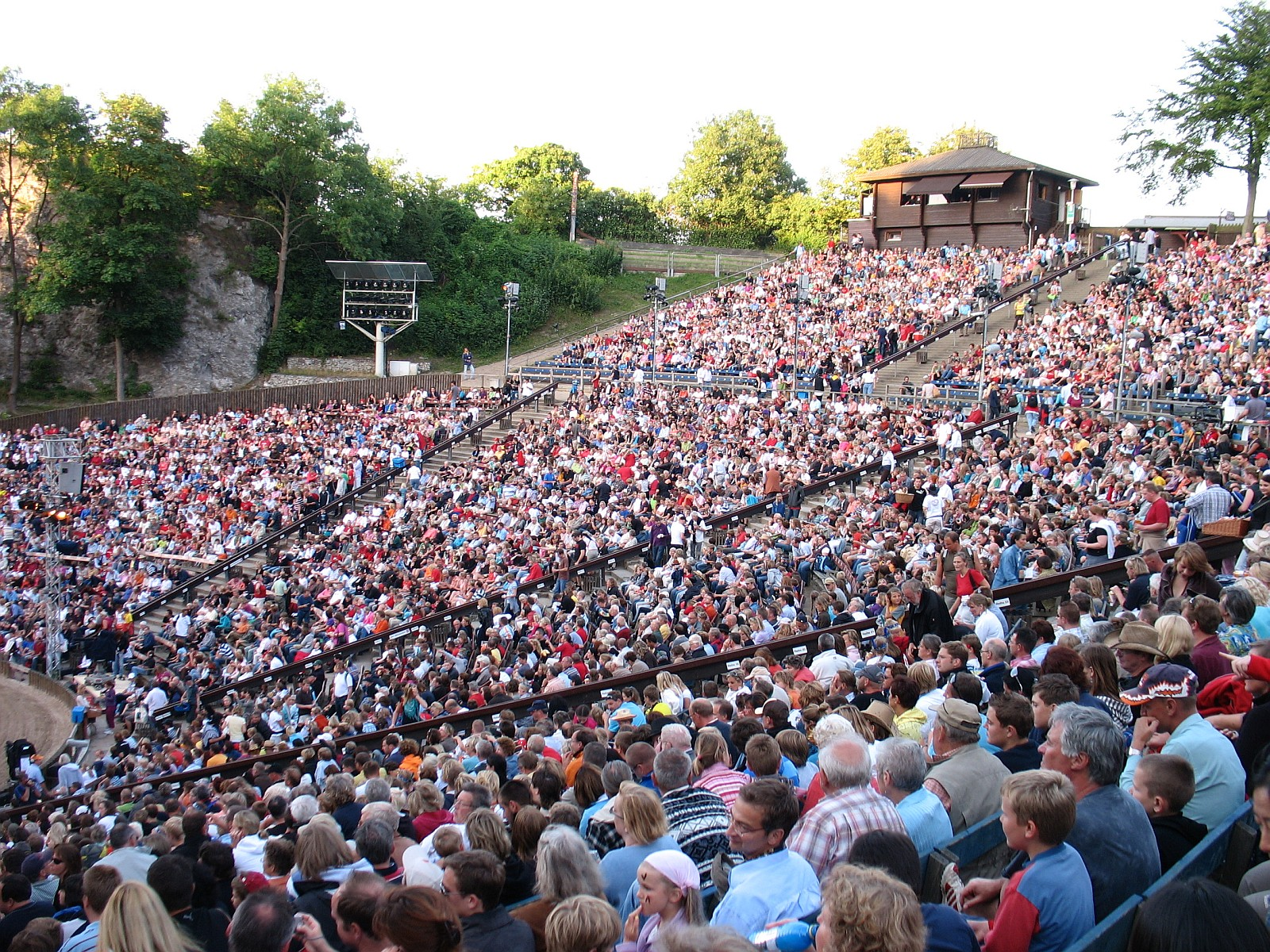
Audience at a performance during the Karl May Festival

The Kalkberg Stadium (German: Kalkbergstadion) is an open-air theatre built in a former quarry on the Segeberger Kalkberg, a rocky outcropping in the centre of Bad Segeberg, Schleswig-Holstein, Germany. It was built as a Thingplatz under the Third Reich and since 1952 has been the site of the annual Bad Segeberg Karl May Festival.

The Kalkberg was mined for salt until 1860 and was the site of a gypsum quarry until 1931. After the Nazis came to power, the quarry was converted into an amphitheatre to be used for mass meetings and multimedia theatrical performances as part of the Thingspiel movement. The theatre was designed by Fritz Schaller of Berlin, and was constructed mostly by the Reich Labour Service beginning on 29 May 1934. The work entailed sealing salt-mining shafts and cavities and bringing in 1,200 tonnes of granite from Silesia as building material, since the anhydrite core of the hill itself is water-soluble. The theatre was dedicated on 10 October 1937 by Joseph Goebbels as the Feierstätte der Nordmark or Nordmark-Feierstätte (Northern March Ceremonial Site); in his speech he expressed the wish it would be a "political church of National Socialism". A performance of Henrik Herse's Die Schlacht der weißen Schiffe took place there, probably in 1938, but after that there were no further performances until the end of World War II.

Immediately after the war, the arena was used amongst other things for boxing and for circus performances, before becoming the site of the Karl May Festival in 1952. Concerts also take place there, including Norddeutscher Rundfunk's annual Kult am Kalkberg. With the Berlin Waldbühne and the Freilichtbühne Loreley, it is one of the best known of the former Thing sites.

Schaller did not do any further blasting, but used the existing shape of the quarry, so the arena is asymmetrical and has a smaller stage area to one side. There is a rocky peak behind the stage, and loudspeakers were not installed because of the natural amplification. Originally there was to have been a monument behind the theatre. 14,000 seats and room for 6,000 standees were planned, but the theatre as built seats 10,000 and has room for 4,000 standees.
